= Culture of France =

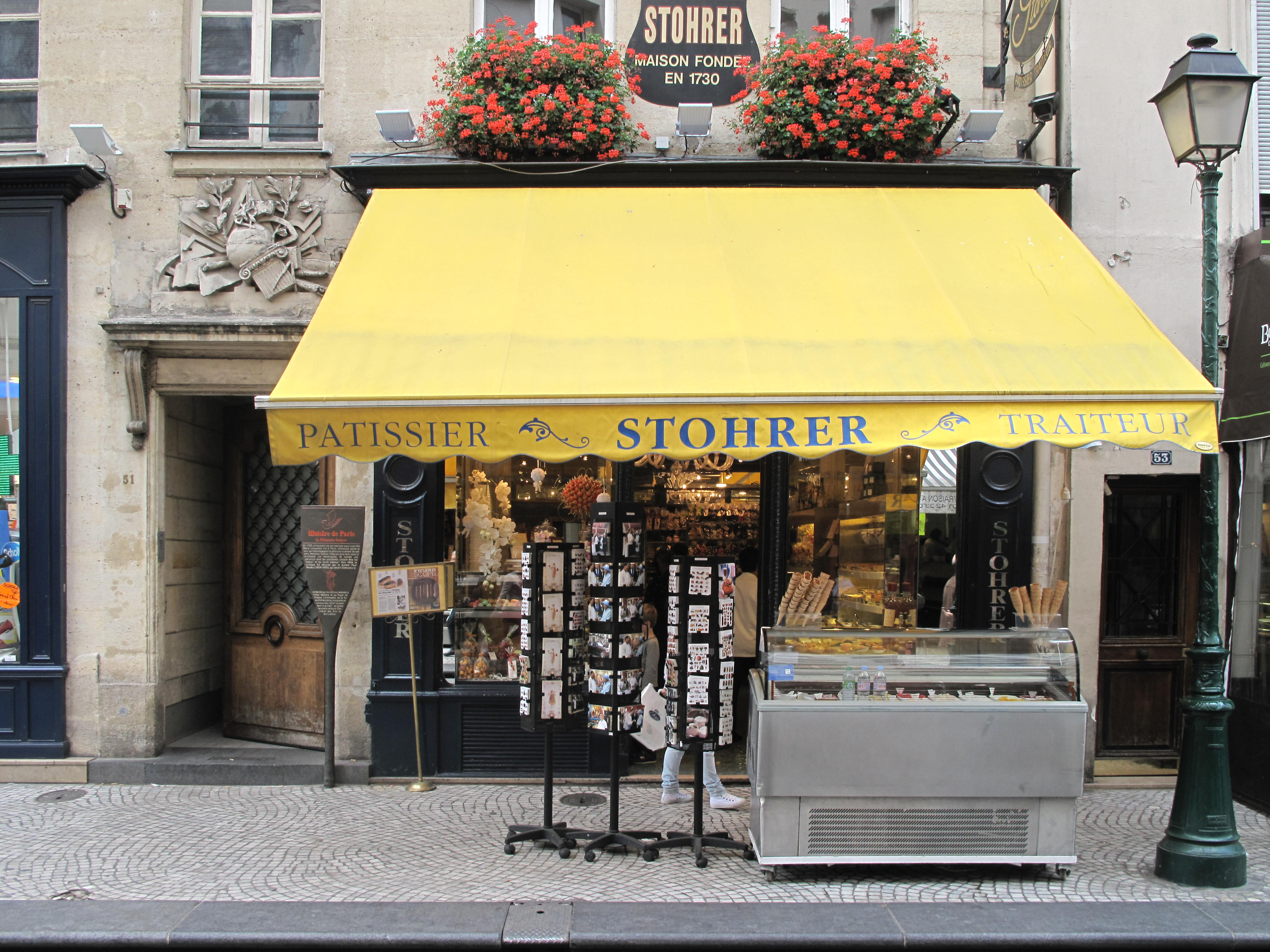
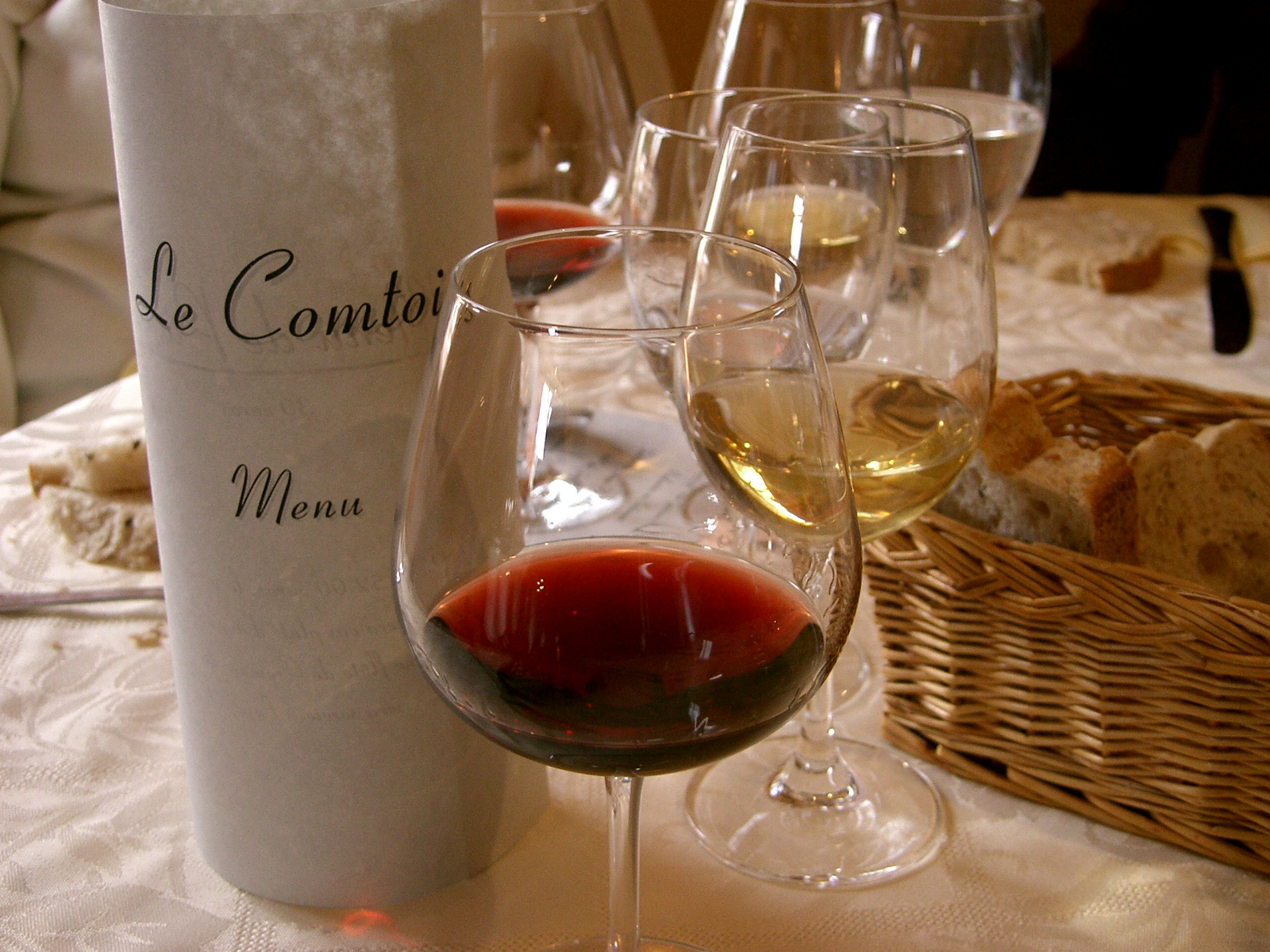
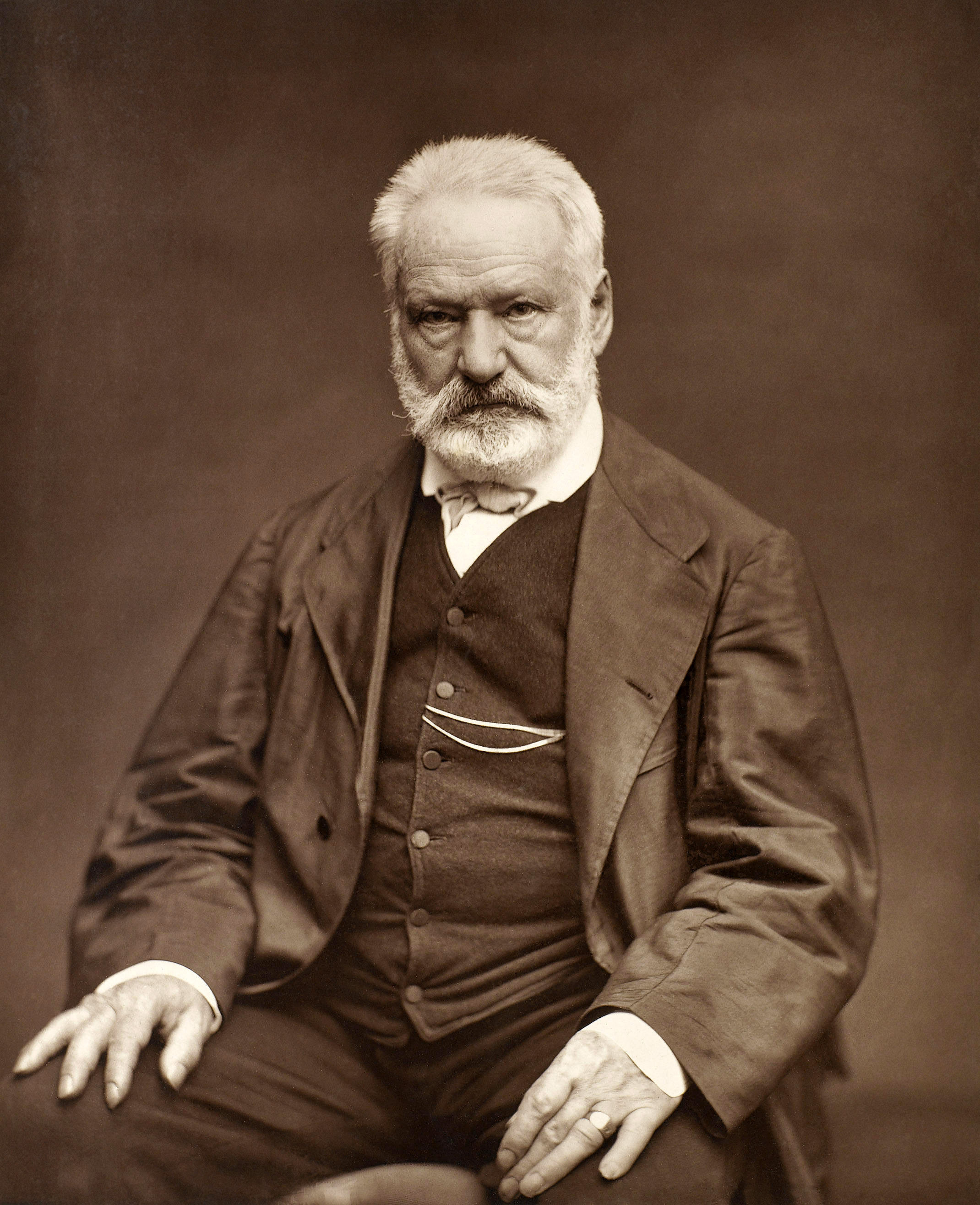
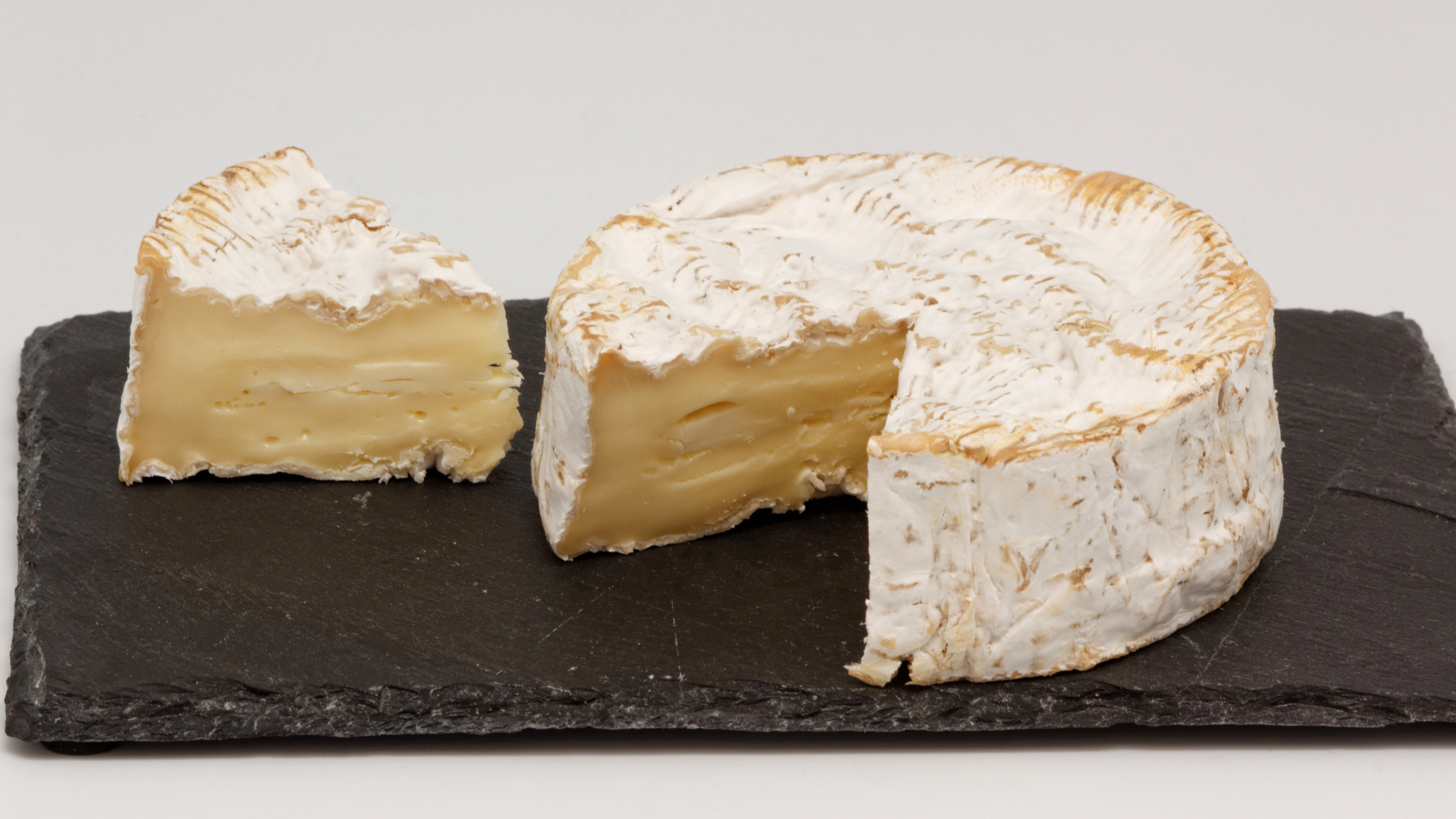
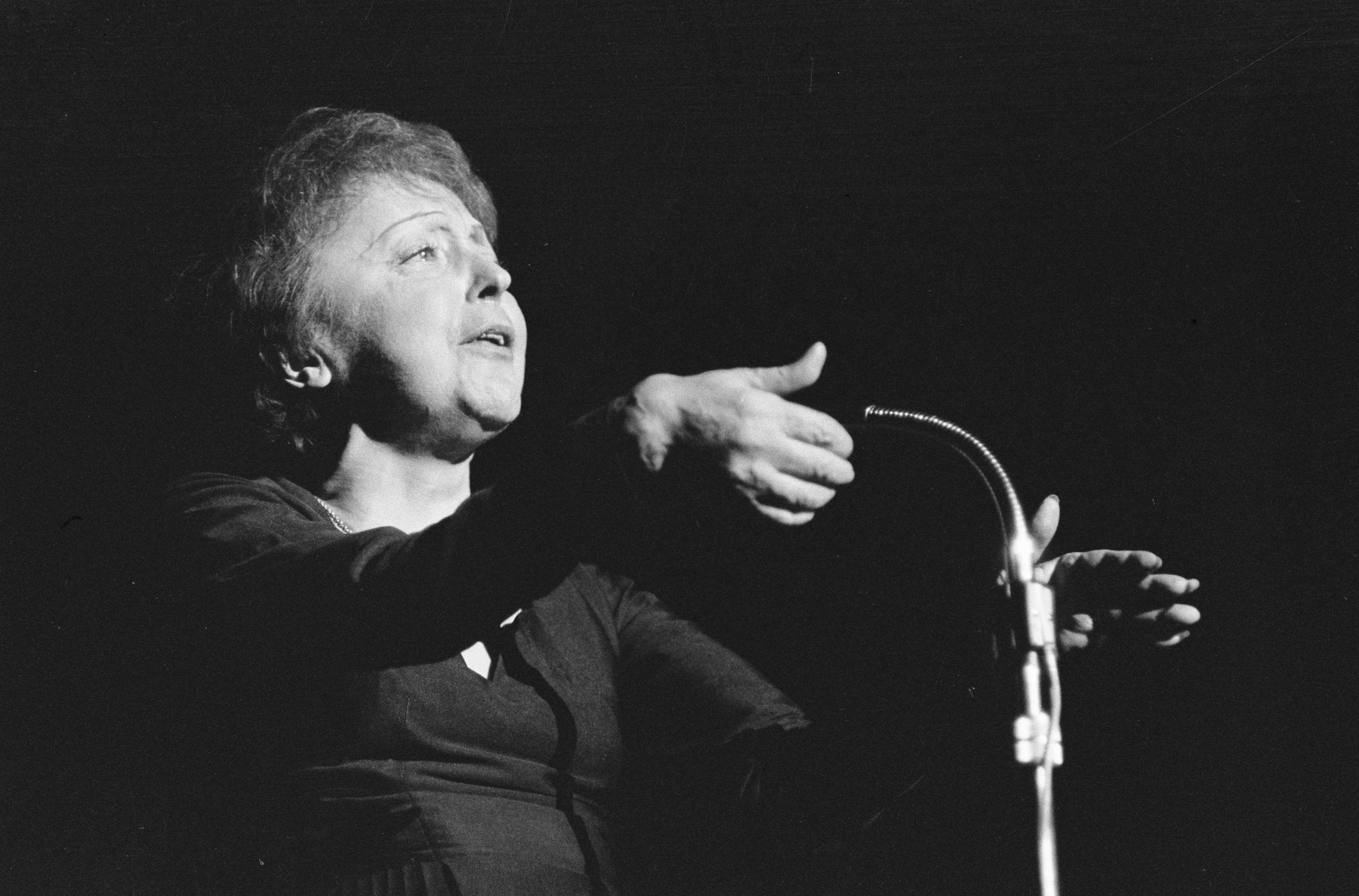
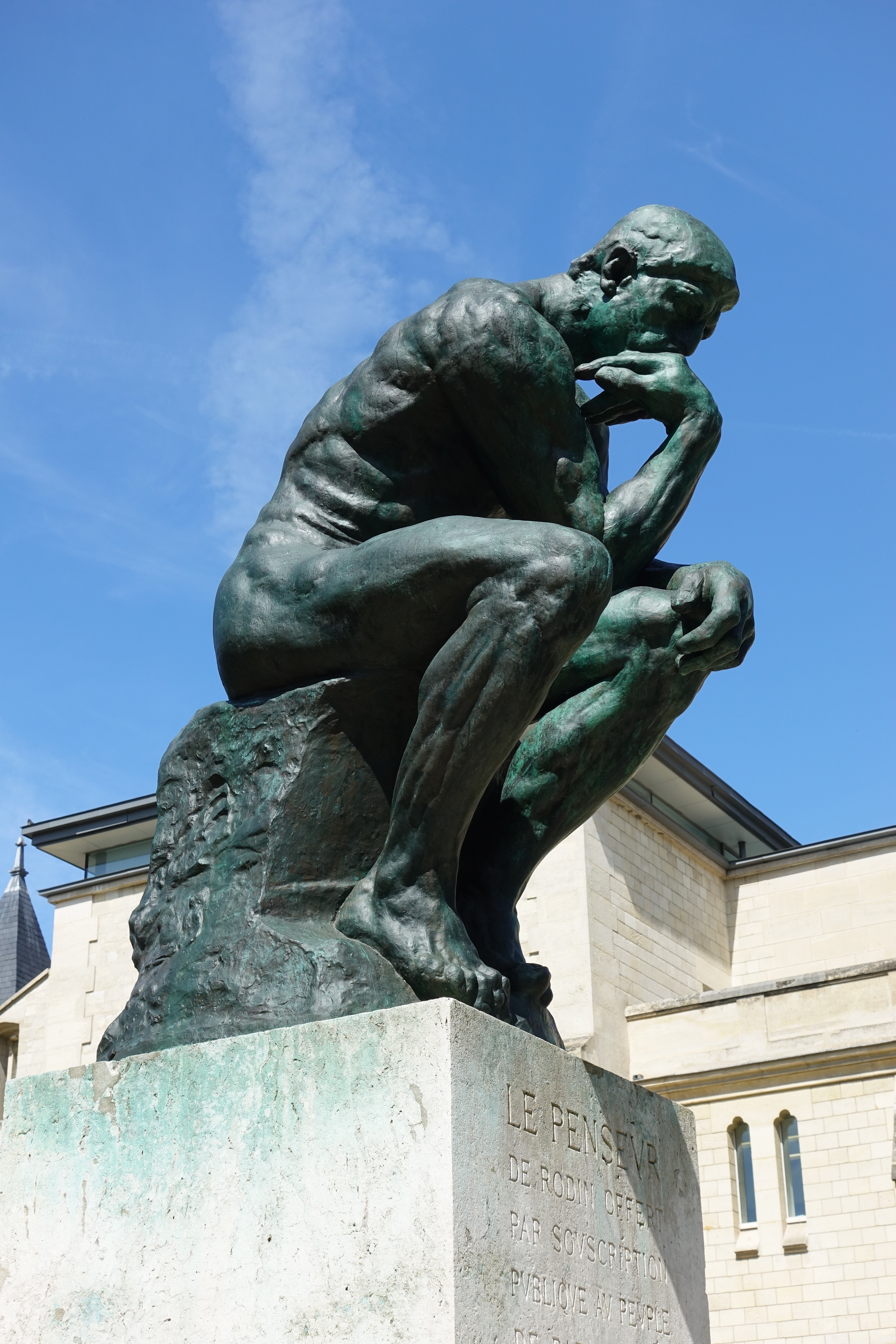
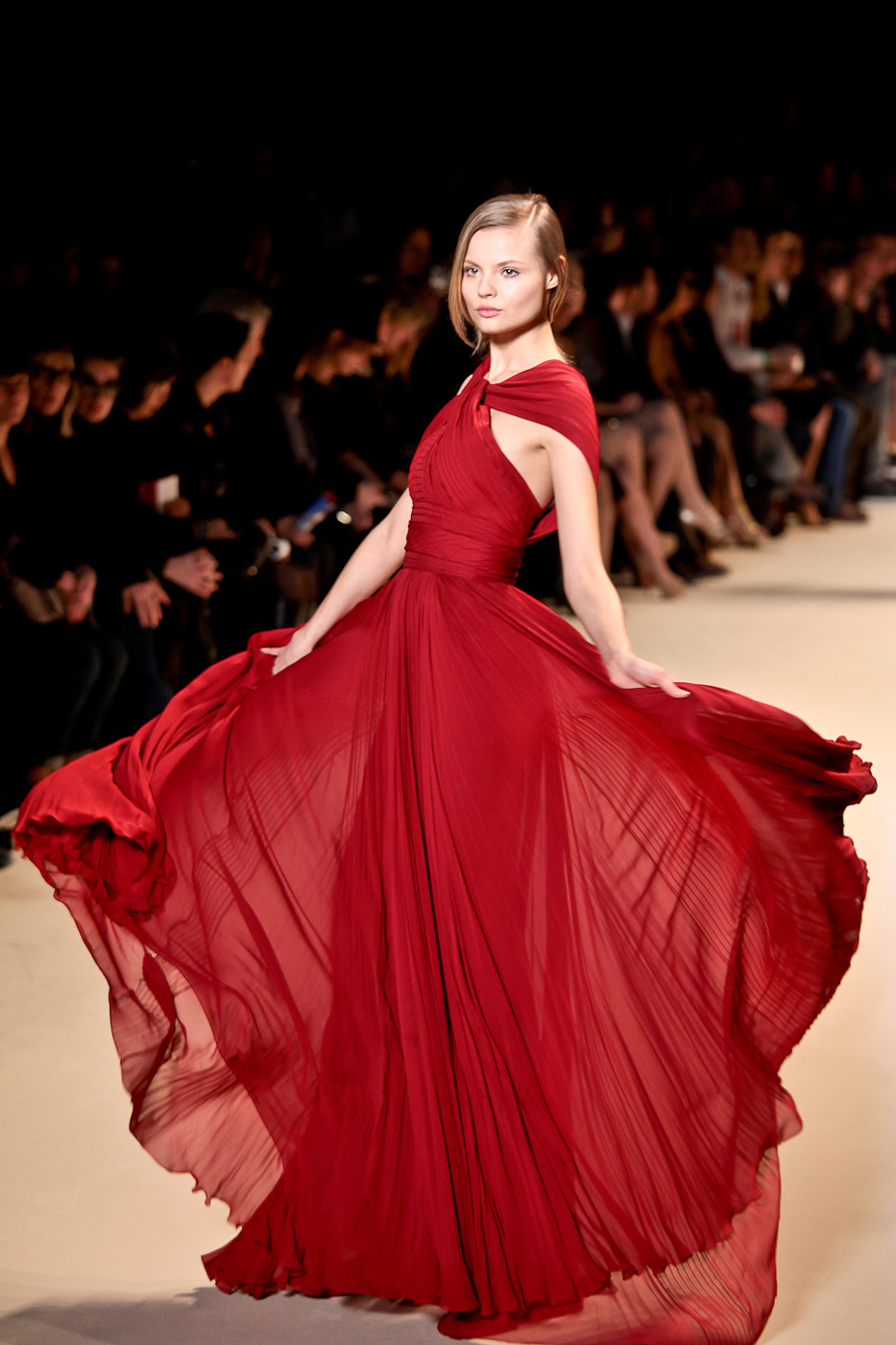
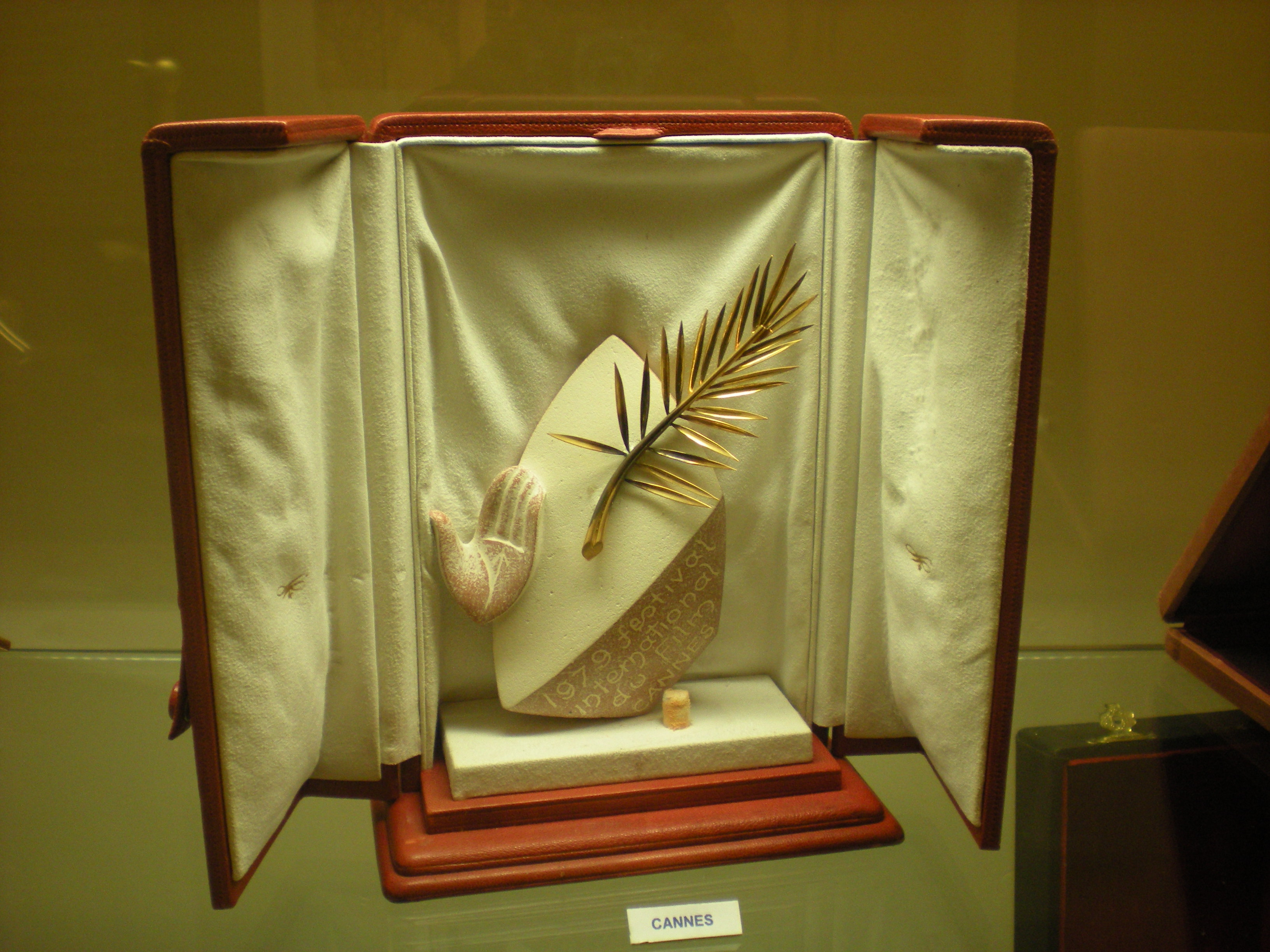
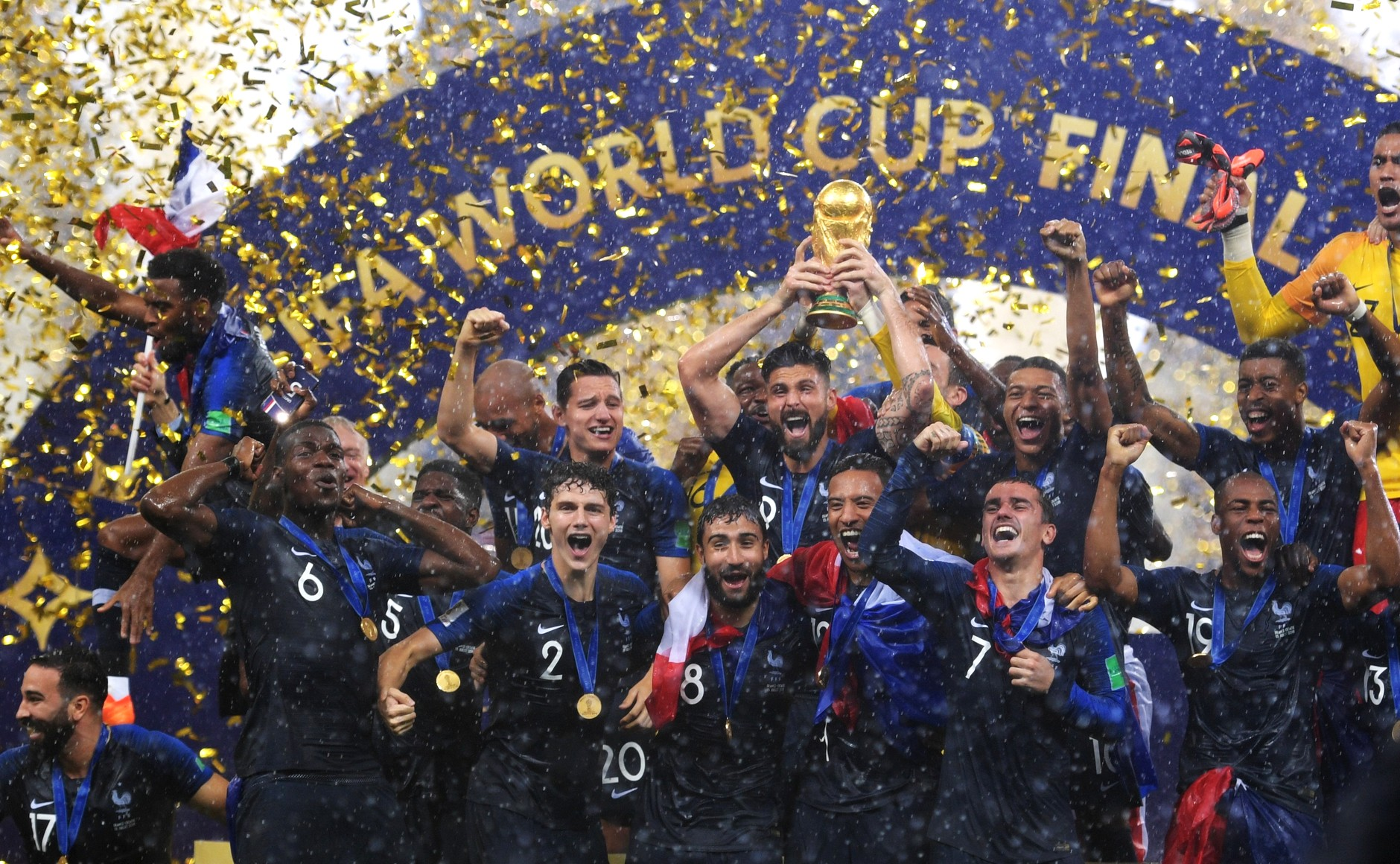
From top, left to right: Oldest patisserie in Paris, Arc de Triomphe, French wines, Liberty Leading the People, Victor Hugo, Camembert, Édith Piaf, The Thinker, Paris Fashion Week, Palme d'Or of Cannes Film Festival, and France national football team

The culture of France has been shaped by geography, by historical events, and by foreign and internal forces and groups. France, and in particular Paris, has played an important role as a center of high culture in the late Middle-Ages and again since the 17th century and from the 19th century on, worldwide. France and in particular Paris was viewed during the 19th and early 20th century as the capital of Western art and culture. From the late 19th century, France has also played an important role in cinema, fashion, cuisine, literature, technology, the social sciences, and mathematics. The importance of French culture has waxed and waned over the centuries, depending on its economic, political and military importance. French culture today is marked both by great regional and socioeconomic differences and strong unifying tendencies. A global opinion poll for the BBC saw France ranked as the country with the fourth most positive influence in the world (behind Germany, Canada and the UK) in 2014.

== French culture ==
The Académie Française sets an official standard of linguistic purism; however, this standard, which is not mandatory, is occasionally ignored by the government itself: for instance, the left-wing government of Lionel Jospin pushed for the feminisation of the names of some functions (madame la ministre) while the Académie pushed for some more traditional madame le ministre.

Some action has been taken by the government to promote French culture and the French language. For instance, they have established a system of subsidies and preferential loans for supporting French cinema. The Toubon law, from the name of the conservative culture minister who promoted it, makes it mandatory to use French in advertisements directed to the general public. Note that contrary to some misconceptions sometimes found in the Anglophone media, the French government neither regulates the language used by private parties in commercial settings, nor makes it compulsory that France-based WWW sites should be in French.

France counts many regional languages, some of them being very different from standard French, such as Breton (a Celtic language close to Cornish and Welsh) and Alsatian (an Alemannic dialect of German). Some regional languages are Roman, like French, such as Occitan. The Basque language is completely unrelated to the French language and to any other language in the world; it is spoken in an area that straddles the border between the southwest of France and the north of Spain.

Many of these languages have enthusiastic advocates; however, the real importance of local languages remains subject to debate. In April 2001, the Minister of Education, Jack Lang, admitted formally that for more than two centuries, the political powers of the French government had repressed regional languages. He announced that bilingual education would, for the first time, be recognised, and bilingual teachers recruited in French public schools to support teaching these other languages. In French schools, pupils are expected to learn at least two foreign languages, the first of which is typically German or English.

A revision of the French constitution creating official recognition of regional languages was implemented by the Parliament in Congress at Versailles in July 2008.

== Religions in France ==
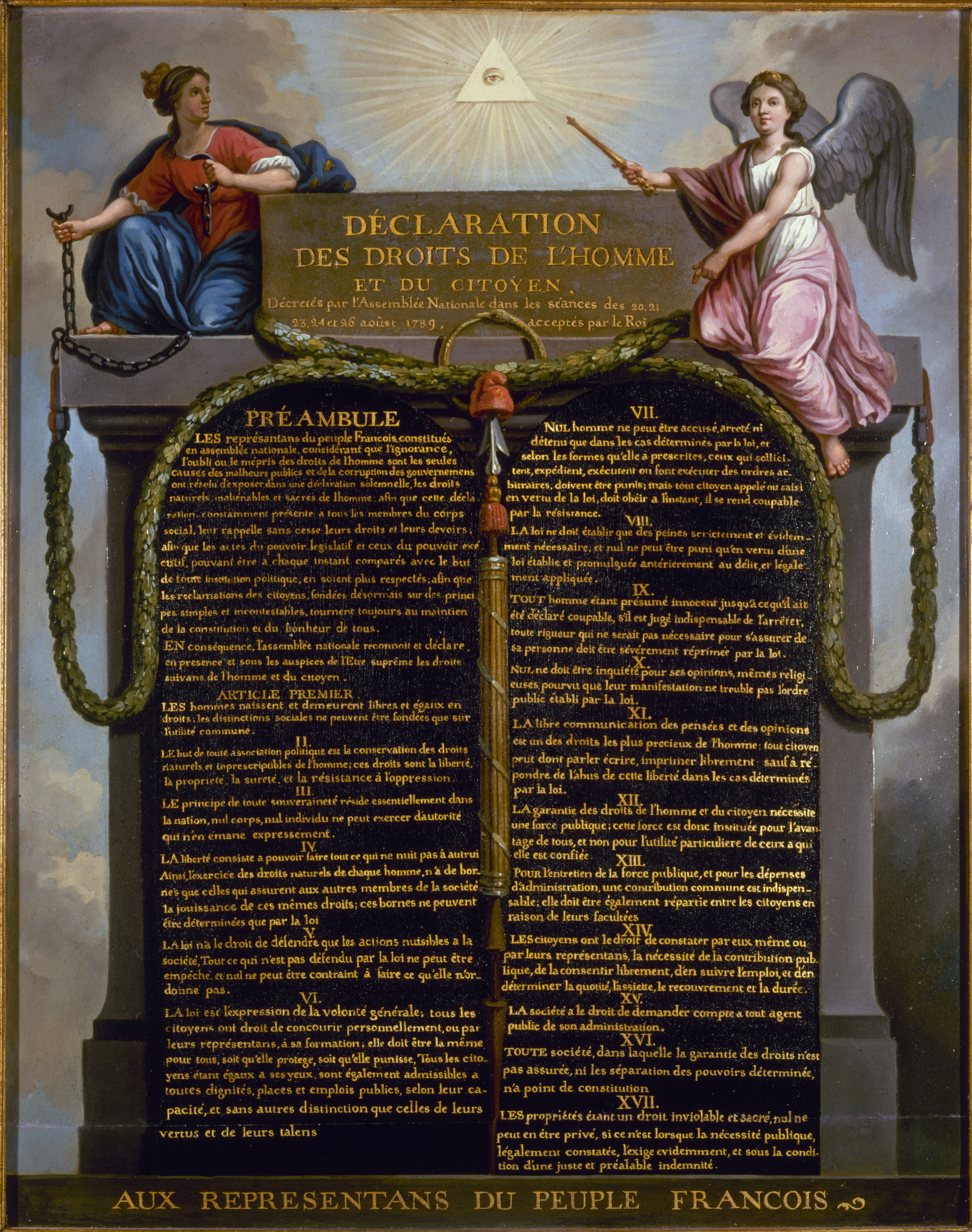
The Declaration of the Rights of Man and of the Citizen (1789) guarantees freedom of religion, as long as religious activities do not infringe on public order in ways detrimental to society.

France is a secular country where freedom of thought and of conscience which encompasses and supersedes freedom of religion is preserved, by virtue of the 1789 Declaration of the Rights of Man and of the Citizen. The Republic is based on the principle of laïcité, which relies on the division between private life, where adherents believe religion belongs, and the public sphere, in which each individual should appear as a simple citizen who is equal to all other citizens, not putting the emphasis on any ethnic, religious, or other particularities. French secularism also includes freedom of conscience i.e. the freedom to believe or not to believe and even to change one's faith across one's life (including of agnosticism and atheism) enforced by the Jules Ferry laws and the 1905 law on the separation of the State and the Church, enacted at the beginning of the Third Republic (1871–1940). A 2011 European poll found that a third (33%) of the French population "does not believe there is any sort of spirit, God or life force". In 2011, in a poll published by Institut français d'opinion publique 65% of the French population describes itself as Christians, and 25% as not adhering any religion.

According to Eurobarometer poll in 2012, Christianity is the largest religion in France accounting 60% of French citizens. Catholics are the largest Christian group in France, accounting for 50% of French citizens, while Protestants make up 8%, and other Christians make up 2%. Non believer/Agnostic account for 20%, Atheist 13%, and Muslim 7%.

France guarantees freedom of religion as a constitutional right, and the government generally respects this right in practice. A long history of violent conflict between groups led the state to break its ties to the established Catholic Church early in the last century, which previously had been the state religion. The government adopted a strong commitment to maintaining a totally secular public sector.

=== Catholicism ===
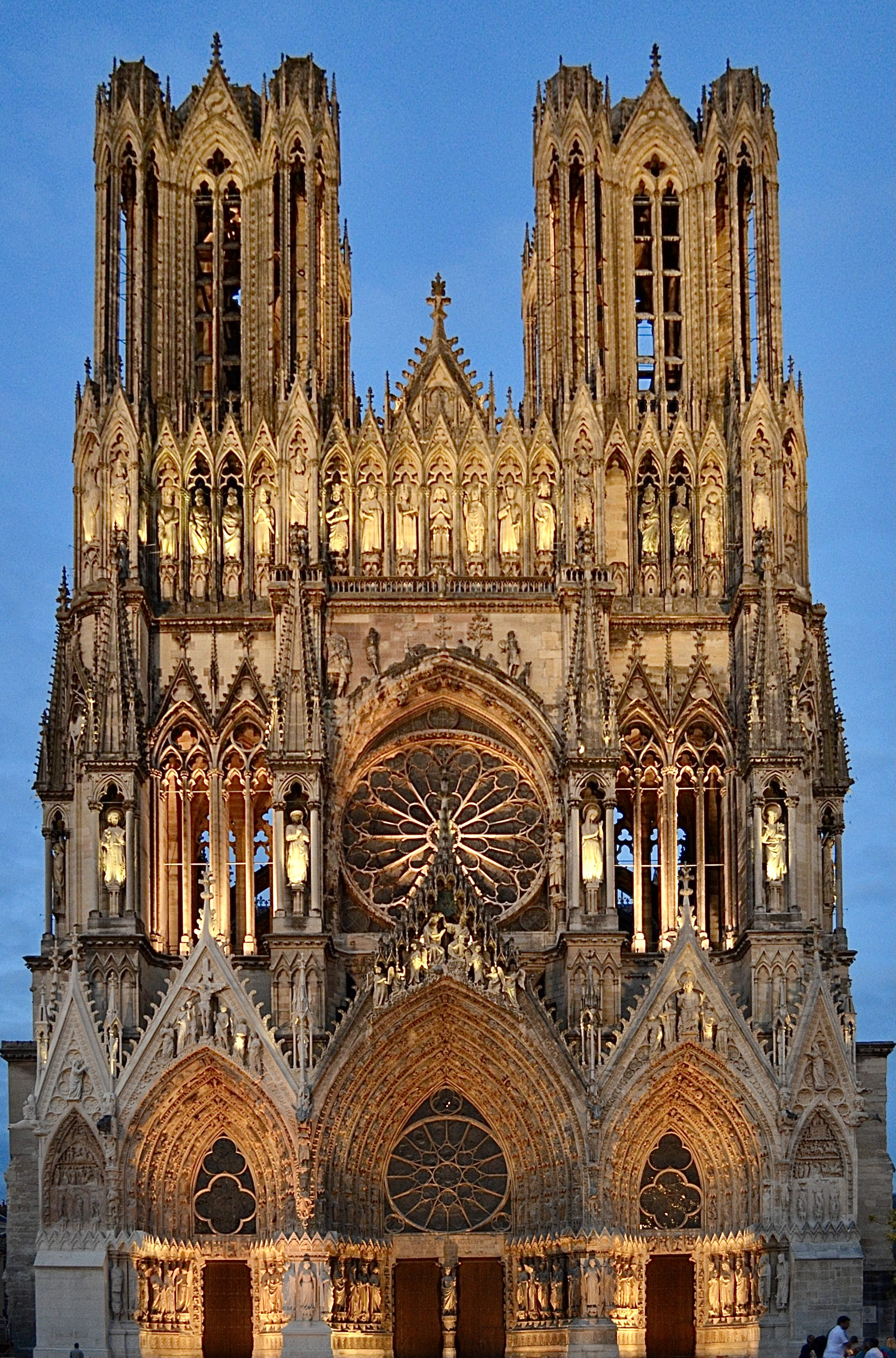
Notre-Dame de Reims is the Roman Catholic cathedral where the Kings of France were crowned until 1825. (Note: The last sacre was that of Charles X, 29 May 1825.)

Long the established state religion, the Catholic Church has historically played a significant role in French culture and in French life. Kings were prominent members as well as head of the state and social order. Most French people are Catholics; however, many of them are secular but still place high value on Catholicism.

The Catholic faith is no longer considered the state religion, as it was before the 1789 Revolution and throughout the various, non-republican regimes of the 19th century (the Restoration, the July Monarchy and the Second Empire). The institutional split of the Catholic Church and French State ("Séparation de l'Eglise et de l'Etat") was imposed by the latter in 1905 and represented the crest of a wave of the laicist and anti-clericalist movement among French Radical Republicans in this period.

At the beginning of the 20th century, France was a largely rural country with conservative Catholic mores, but in the hundred years since then, the countryside has become depopulated as people have become urbanized. The urban populations have become more secular. A December 2006 poll by Harris Interactive, published in The Financial Times, found that 32% of the French population described themselves as agnostic, some 32% as atheist, and only 27% believed in any type of God or supreme being. according to the French Market research Ipsos, Catholics today constitute 57.5% of the French population.

=== Protestantism ===
France was touched by the Reformation during the 16th century; some 30% of the population converted to Protestantism and became known as French Huguenots. Some princes joined the reform movement. But the national monarchy felt threatened by people who wanted to leave the established state religion. Protestants were discriminated against and suppressed. On 24 August 1572, the St. Bartholomew's Day massacre took place in Paris and the French Wars of Religion are considered to have begun. this French civil war took place between Catholics, led by Henry I, Duke of Guise, and Protestants, led by Henri de Navarre. Henri de Navarre became king after converting to Catholicism in 1589.

Louis XIII, Henri IV's son, began to suppress Protestants in violent attacks, such as the Siege of La Rochelle. After Louis XIV revoked the Edit de Nantes in 1685, Protestants who did not leave the country were generally suppressed. Thousands of Protestant Huguenots emigrated from France for their safety and to gain religious freedom, generally going to Protestant nations such as the Netherlands, England, South Africa, and the North American colonies. Their exile continued during the 17th century and until 1787, when religious freedom was re-established by Louis XVI.

=== Judaism ===
The current Jewish community in France numbers around 600,000, according to the World Jewish Congress and 500,000 according to the Appel Unifié Juif de France. It is concentrated in the metropolitan areas of Paris, Marseille and Strasbourg.

The history of the Jews in France dates back over 2,000 years. In the early Middle Ages, France was a center of Jewish learning, but persecution increased as the Middle Ages wore on. France was the first country in Europe to emancipate its Jewish population during the French Revolution, but despite legal equality anti-Semitism remained an issue, as illustrated in the Dreyfus affair of the late 19th century. However, through the 1870 Décret Crémieux, France secured full citizenship for the Jews in then French-ruled Algeria. Despite the death of a quarter of all French Jews during the Holocaust, France currently has the largest Jewish population in Europe.

Following emancipation In the 19th century, Jews would come to play a larger role in French culture. Jewish artists were a major part of the School of Paris and included artists such as Marc Chagall, Amedeo Modigliani, Yitzhak Frenel, Chaim Soutine, Jules Pascin and others. Frenkel said the Jewish artists were "members of the minority characterized by restlessness whose expressionism is therefore extreme in its emotionalism". Camille Pissaro was also a major figure in the Impressionism movement.

In the early 21st century, French Jews are mostly Sephardic and of North African origins. More than a quarter of the historic Ashkenazi Jewish community was destroyed during the Holocaust of World War II after German forces occupied France and established the Vichy Regime. Jewish religious affiliations range from the ultra-Orthodox Haredi communities to the large segment of Jews who are secular and identify culturally as Jews.

=== Islam ===
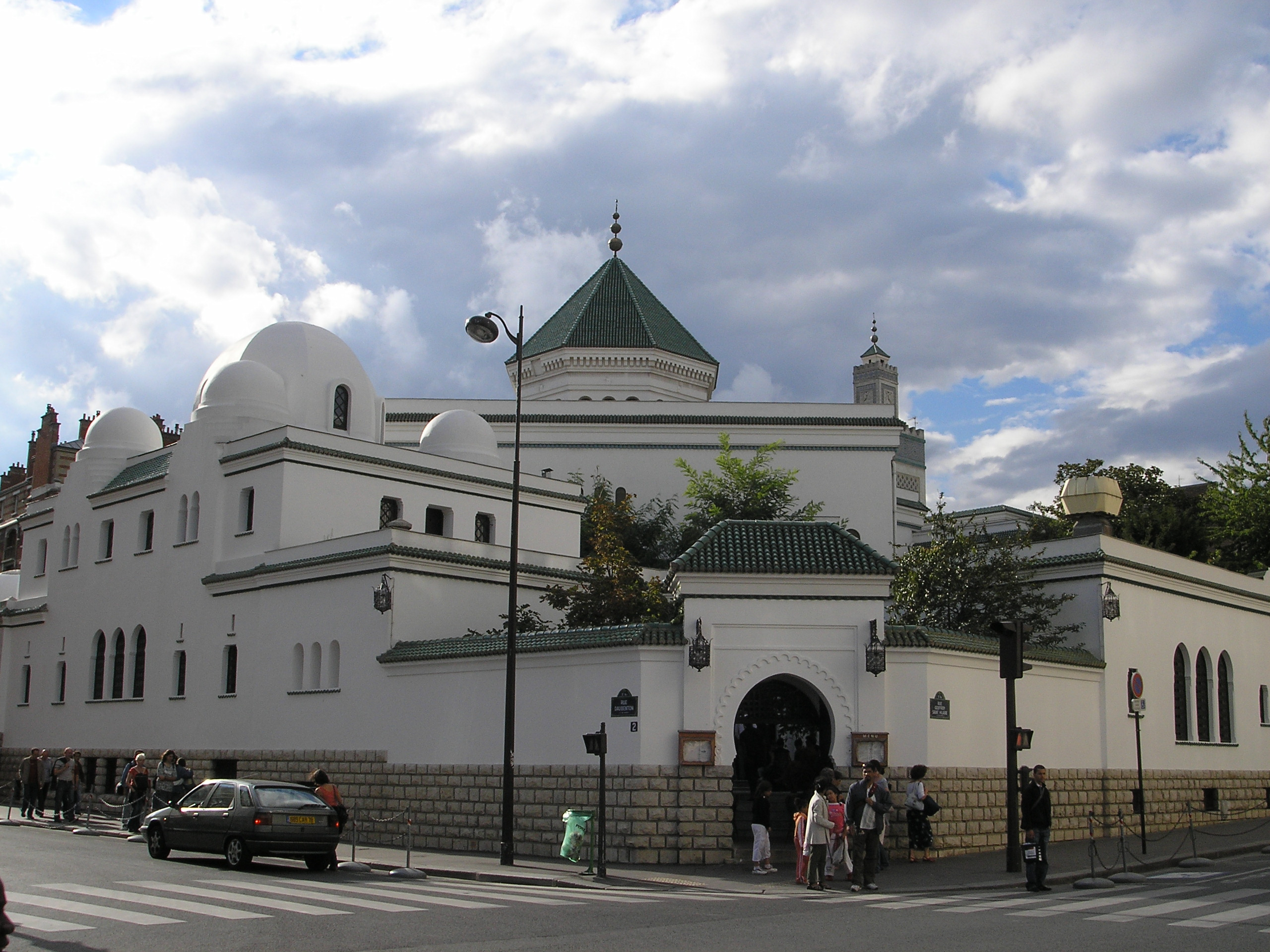
The Grand Mosque in Paris

Islam is the third-largest faith in France in the early 21st century. The Grand Mosque was constructed in Paris in 1929 in honour of French colonial troops from North Africa who fought in the First World War. Arabs from North Africa started to settle in France. In the early 21st century, France had the largest Muslim population (in percentage) of any Western European country. This is a result of immigration and permanent family settlement in France, from the 1960s on, of groups from, principally, former French colonies in North Africa (Algeria, Morocco, Tunisia), and, to a lesser extent, other areas such as Turkey and West Africa. The government does not collect data on religious beliefs in census records, but estimates and polls place the percentage of Muslims at between 4% and 7%.

=== Buddhism ===
Buddhism is widely reported to be the fifth largest religion in France, after Christianity, atheism, Islam, and Judaism. France has over two hundred Buddhist meditation centers, including about twenty sizable retreat centers in rural areas. The Buddhist population mainly consists of Chinese and Vietnamese immigrants, with a substantial minority of native French converts and "sympathizers". The rising popularity of Buddhism in France has been the subject of considerable discussion in the French media and academy in recent years. The Plum Village Tradition school of Buddhism was developed in France with the Plum Village Monastery located in the Dordogne.

=== Cults and new religious movements ===
France created in 2006 the first French parliamentary commission on cult activities which led to a report registering a number of cults considered as dangerous. Supporters of such movements have criticized the report on the grounds of the respect of religious freedom. Proponents of the measure contend that only dangerous cults have been listed as such, and state secularism ensures religious freedom in France.

== Regional customs and traditions ==
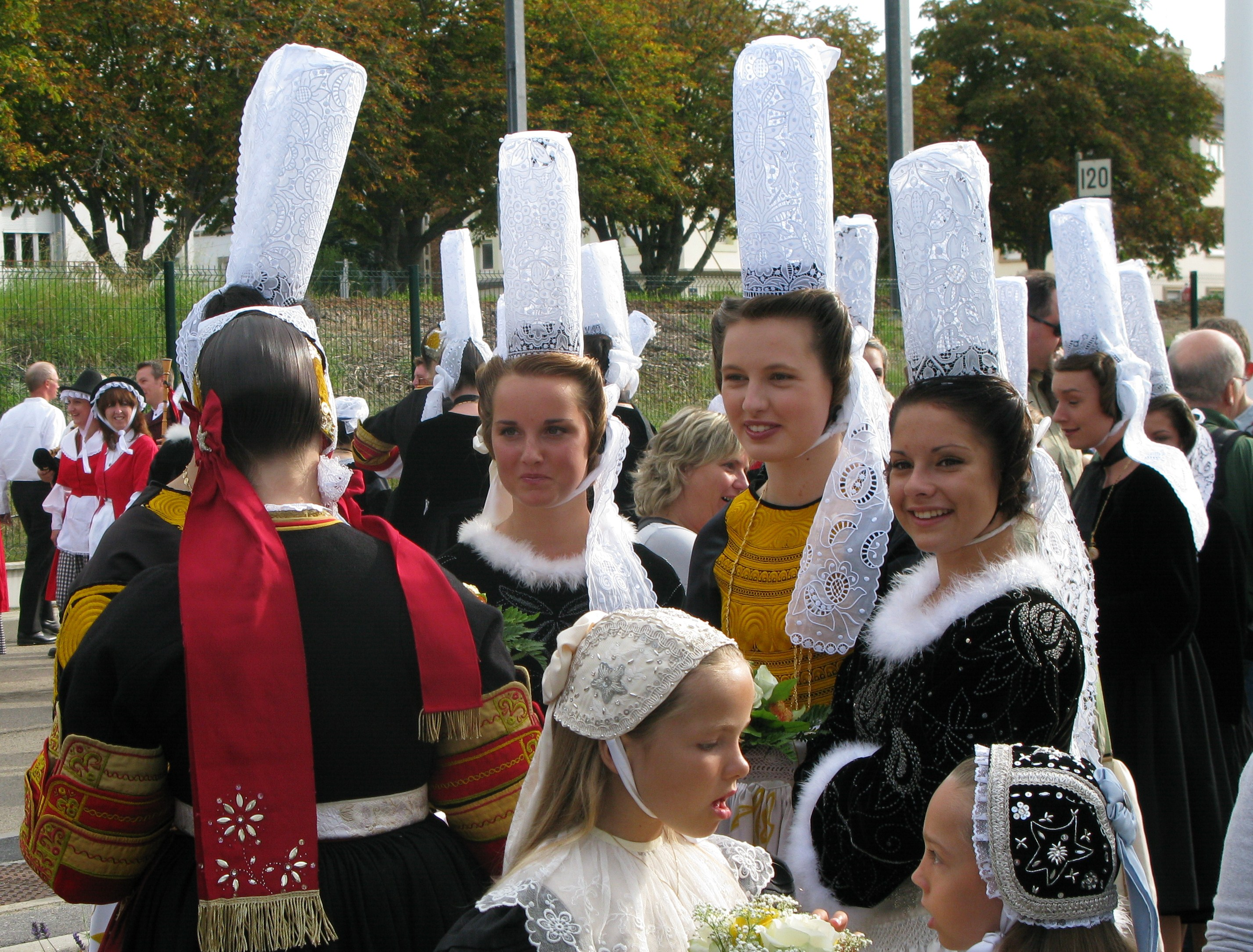
Breton women and girls wearing headdresses during a festival

Modern France is the result of centuries of nation building and the acquisition and incorporation of a number of historical provinces and overseas colonies into its geographical and political structure. These regions all evolved with their own specific cultural and linguistic traditions in fashion, religious observance, regional language and accent, family structure, cuisine, leisure activities, industry, and including the simple way to pour wine, etc.

The evolution of the French state and culture, from the Renaissance up to this day, has however promoted a centralization of politics, media and cultural production in and around Paris (and, to a lesser extent, around the other major urban centers), and the industrialization of the country in the 20th century has led to a massive move of French people from the countryside to urban areas. At the end of the 19th century, around 50% of the French depended on the land for a living; today French farmers only make up 6–7%, while 73% live in cities. Nineteenth century French literature abounds in scenes of provincial youth "coming up" to Paris to "make it" in the cultural, political or social scene of the capital (this scheme is frequent in the novels of Balzac). Policies enacted by the French Third Republic also encouraged this displacement through mandatory military service, a centralized national educational system, and suppression of regional languages. While government policy and public debate in France in recent years has returned to a valorization of regional differences and a call for decentralization of certain aspects of the public sphere (sometimes with ethnic, racial or reactionary overtones), the history of regional displacement and the nature of the modern urban environment and of mass media and culture have made the preservation of a regional "sense of place or culture" in today's France extremely difficult.

The names of the historical French provinces – such as Brittany (Bretagne), Berry, Orléanais, Normandy (Normandie), Languedoc, Lyonnais, Dauphiné, Champagne, Poitou, Guyenne and Gascony (Gascogne), Burgundy (Bourgogne), Picardy (Picardie), Provence, Touraine, Limousin, Auvergne, Béarn, Alsace, Flanders, Lorraine, Corsica (Corse), Savoy (Savoie)... (please see individual articles for specifics about each regional culture) — are still used to designate natural, historical and cultural regions, and many of them appear in modern région or département names. These names are also used by the French in their self-identification of family origin.

Regional identification is most pronounced today in cultures linked to regional languages and non-French-speaking traditions – French language itself being only a dialect of Langue d'oïl, the mother language of many of the languages to-be-mentioned, which became a national vehicular language, like (in alphabetical order): Alsatian, Arpitan, Basque, Brezhoneg (Breton), Burgundian, Corsu (Corsican), Català (Catalan), Francique, Gallo, Lorrain, Norman, Occitan, Picard, Poitevin, Saintongeais, etc., and some of these regions have promoted movements calling for some degree of regional autonomy, and, occasionally, national independence (see, for example, Breton nationalism, Corsica and Occitania).

There are huge differences in life style, socioeconomic status and world view between Paris and the provinces. The French often use the expression "la France profonde" ("Deep France", similar to "heartland") to designate the profoundly "French" aspects of provincial towns, village life and rural agricultural culture, which escape the hegemony of Paris. The expression can however have a pejorative meaning, similar to the expression "le désert français" ("the French desert") used to describe a lack of acculturation of the provinces. Another expression, "terroir" is a French term originally used for wine and coffee to denote the special characteristics that geography bestowed upon these products. It can be very loosely translated as "a sense of place" which is embodied in certain qualities, and the sum of the effects that the local environment (especially the "soil") has had on the growth of the product. The use of the term has since been generalized to talk about many cultural products.

In addition to its metropolitan territory, France also consists of overseas departments made up of its former colonies of Guadeloupe, Martinique and French Guiana in the Caribbean, and Mayotte and Réunion in the Indian Ocean. (There also exists a number of "overseas collectivities" and "overseas territories". For a full discussion, see administrative divisions of France. Since 1982, following the French government's policy of decentralisation, overseas departments have elected regional councils with powers similar to those of the regions of metropolitan France. As a result of a constitutional revision which occurred in 2003, these regions are now to be called overseas regions.) These overseas departments have the same political status as metropolitan departments and are integral parts of France, (similar to the way in which Hawaii is a state and an integral part of the United States), yet they also have specific cultural and linguistic traditions which set them apart. Certain elements of overseas culture have also been introduced to metropolitan culture (as, for example, the musical form the biguine).

Industrialization, immigration and urbanization in the nineteenth and twentieth centuries have also created new socioeconomic regional communities in France, both urban (like Paris, Lyon, Villeurbanne, Lille, Marseille, etc.) and the suburban and working class hinterlands (like Seine-Saint-Denis) of urban agglomerations (called variously banlieues ("suburbs", sometimes qualified as "chic" or "pauvres" or les cités "housing projects")) which have developed their own "sense of place" and local culture (much like the various boroughs of New York City or suburbs of Los Angeles), as well as cultural identity.

== Other specific communities ==
Paris has traditionally been associated with alternative, artistic or intellectual subcultures, many of which involved foreigners. Such subcultures include the "Bohemians" of the mid-nineteenth century, the Impressionists, artistic circles of the Belle Époque (around such artists as Picasso and Alfred Jarry), the Dadaists, Surrealists, the "Lost Generation" (Hemingway, Gertrude Stein) and the post-war "intellectuals" associated with Montparnasse (Jean-Paul Sartre, Simone de Beauvoir).

France has an estimated 280,000–340,000 Roma, generally known as Gitans, Tsiganes, Romanichels (slightly pejorative), Bohémiens, or Gens du voyage ("travellers").

There are gay and lesbian communities in the cities, particularly in the Paris metropolitan area (such as in Le Marais district of the capital). Although homosexuality is perhaps not as well tolerated in France as in Spain, Scandinavia, and the Benelux nations, surveys of the French public reveal a considerable shift in attitudes comparable to other Western European nations. As of 2001, 55% of the French consider homosexuality "an acceptable lifestyle." The past mayor of Paris, Bertrand Delanoë, is gay. A 2017 Pew Research Center poll found that 73% of French people were in favour of same-sex marriage, while 23% were opposed. The 2019 Eurobarometer found that 79% of French respondents thought same-sex marriage should be allowed throughout Europe, 15% were against. Additionally, 85% believed gay, lesbian and bisexual people should enjoy the same rights as heterosexual people. See also LGBT rights in France.

== Families and romantic relationships ==
=== Household structure ===
Growing out of the values of the Catholic Church and rural communities, the basic unit of French society was traditionally held to be the family. Over the twentieth century, the "traditional" family structure in France has evolved from various regional models (including extended families and nuclear families) to, after World War II, nuclear families. Since the 1960s, marriages have decreased and divorces have increased in France, and divorce law and legal family status have evolved to reflect these social changes.

According to INSEE figures, household and family composition in metropolitan France continues to evolve. Most significantly, from 1982 to 1999, single parent families have increased from 3.6% to 7.4%; there have also been increases in the number of unmarried couples, childless couples, and single men (from 8.5% to 12.5) and women (from 16.0% to 18.5%). Their analysis indicates that "one in three dwellings are occupied by a person living alone; one in four dwellings are occupied by a childless couple."

=== Civil unions and same-sex marriages ===
Voted by the French Parliament in November 1999 following some controversy, the pacte civil de solidarité ("civil pact of solidarity") commonly known as a PACS, is a form of civil union between two adults (same-sex or opposite-sex) for organizing their joint life. It brings rights and responsibilities, but less so than marriage. From a legal standpoint, a PACS is a "contract" drawn up between the two individuals, which is stamped and registered by the clerk of the court. Individuals who have registered a PACS are still considered "single" with regard to family status for some purposes, while they are increasingly considered in the same way as married couples are for other purposes. While it was pushed by the government of Prime Minister Lionel Jospin in 1998, it was also opposed, mostly by people on the right-wing who support traditionalist family values and who argued that PACS and the recognition of homosexual unions would be disastrous for French society.

As of 2013, same-sex marriage is legally recognized in France. Same-sex marriage was an important factor in the presidential election of 2012 between François Hollande and Nicolas Sarkozy. Sarkozy, who represents the right-wing UMP party, opposed gay marriage, while François Hollande, of the left wing socialist party, supported it. Hollande was elected in May 2012 and his government proposed the law known as "Marriage pour tous" ("marriage for all") to the parliament in November 2012. The law was passed in April 2013 and validated by the Conseil constitutionnel (the constitutional council, tasked with insuring that the new laws passed do not contradict the French constitution) in May 2013. The first French same-sex marriage took place on 29 May 2013 in Montpellier.

== Role of the State ==
The French state has traditionally played an important role in promoting and supporting culture through the educational, linguistic, cultural and economic policies of the government and through its promotion of national identity. Because of the closeness of this relationship, cultural changes in France are often linked to, or produce, political crisis.

The relationship between the French state and culture is an old one. Under Louis XIII's minister Richelieu, the independent Académie française came under state supervision and became an official organ of control over the French language and seventeenth-century literature. During Louis XIV's reign, his minister Jean-Baptiste Colbert brought French luxury industries, like textile and porcelain, under royal control and the architecture, furniture, fashion and etiquette of the royal court (particularly at the Château de Versailles) became the preeminent model of noble culture in France (and, to a great degree, throughout Europe) during the latter half of the seventeenth century.

At times, French state policies have sought to unify the country around certain cultural norms, while at other times they have promoted regional differences within a heterogeneous French identity. The unifying effect was particularly true of the "radical period" of the French Third Republic which fought regionalisms (including regional languages), supported anti-clericalism and a strict separation of church from state (including education) and actively promoted national identity, thus converting (as the historian Eugen Weber has put it) a "country of peasants into a nation of Frenchmen". The Vichy Regime, on the other hand, promoted regional "folk" traditions.

The cultural policies of the (current) French Fifth Republic have been varied, but a consensus seems to exist around the need for preservation of French regionalisms (such as food and language) as long as these don't undermine national identity. Meanwhile, the French state remains ambivalent over the integration into "French" culture of cultural traditions from recent immigrant groups and from foreign cultures, particularly American culture (movies, music, fashion, fast food, language, etc.). There also exists a certain fear over the perceived loss of French identity and culture in the European system and under American "cultural hegemony".

=== Education ===
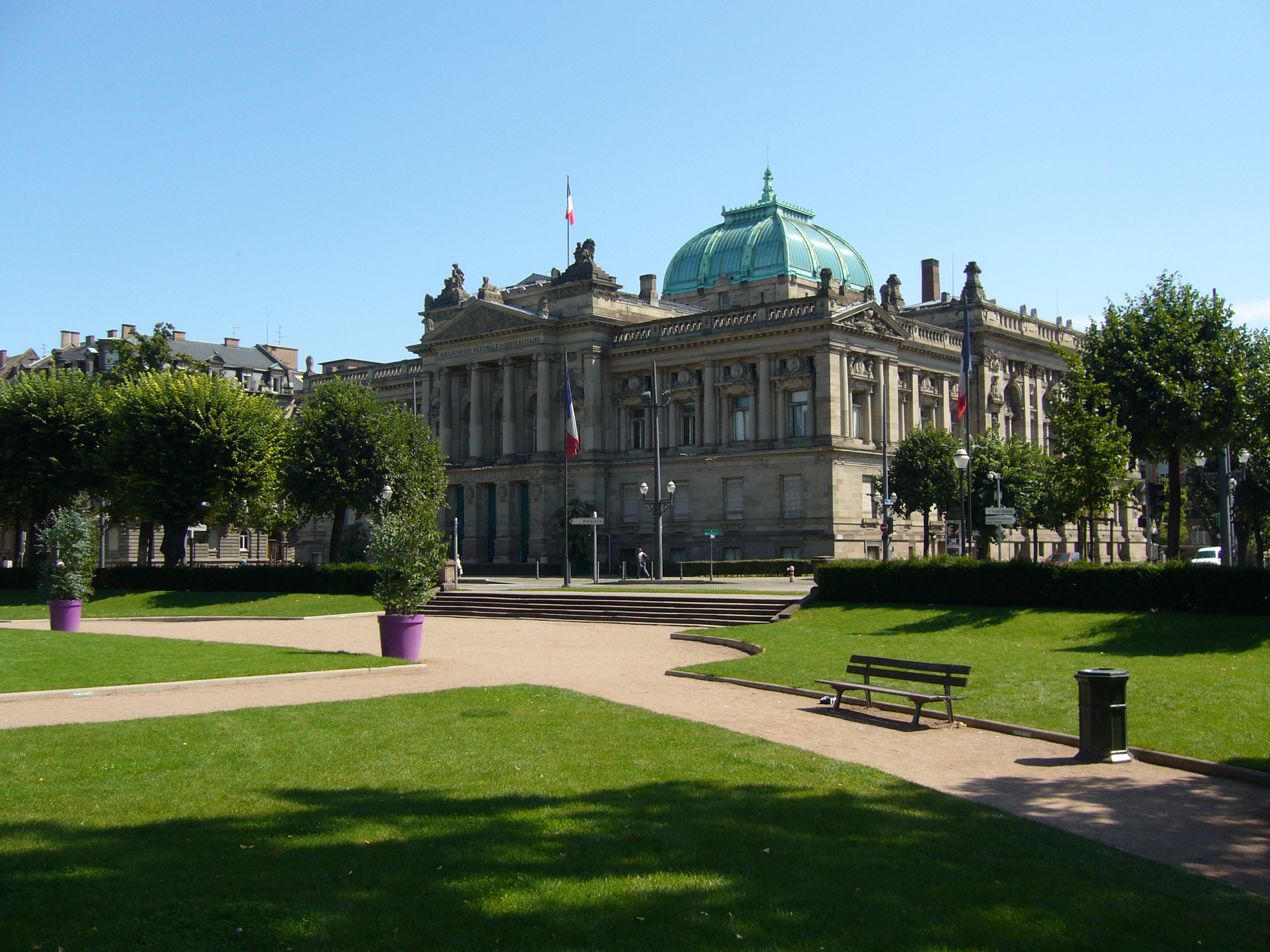
The National and University Library on the campus of the University of Strasbourg

The French educational system is highly centralized. It is divided into three different stages: primary education, or enseignement primaire, corresponding to grade school in the United States; secondary education, or collège and lycée, corresponding to middle and high school in the United States; and higher education (l'université or les Grandes écoles).

Primary and secondary education is predominantly public (private schools also exist, in particular a strong nationwide network of primary and secondary Catholic education), while higher education has both public and private elements. At the end of secondary education, students take the baccalauréat exam, which allows them to pursue higher education. The baccalauréat pass rate in 2012 was 84.5%.

In 1999–2000, educational spending amounted to 7% of the French GDP and 37% of the national budget.

France's performance in math and science at the middle school level was ranked 23 in the 1995 Trends in International Math and Science Study. France was ranked 22 in 2019.

Since the Jules Ferry laws of 1881–2, named after the then Minister of Public Instruction, all state-funded schools, including universities, are independent from the (Roman Catholic) Church. Education in these institutions is free. Non-secular institutions are allowed to organize education as well. The French educational system differs strongly from Northern-European and American systems in that it stresses the importance of partaking in a society as opposed to being responsibly independent.

Secular educational policy has become critical in recent issues of French multiculturalism, as in the "affair of the Islamic headscarf".

=== Minister of Culture ===
The Minister of Culture is in the Government of France, the cabinet member in charge of national museums and monuments; promoting and protecting the arts (visual, plastic, theatrical, musical, dance, architectural, literary, televisual and cinematographic) in France and abroad; and managing the national archives and regional "maisons de culture" (culture centres). The Ministry of Culture is located on the Palais Royal in Paris.

The modern post of Minister of Culture was created by Charles de Gaulle in 1959 and the first Minister was the writer André Malraux. Malraux was responsible for realizing the goals of the "droit à la culture" ("the right to culture") – an idea which had been incorporated in the French constitution and the Universal Declaration of Human Rights (1948) – by democratizing access to culture, while also achieving the Gaullist aim of elevating the "grandeur" ("greatness") of post-war France. To this end, he created numerous regional cultural centres throughout France and actively sponsored the arts. Malraux's artistic tastes included the modern arts and the avant-garde, but on the whole he remained conservative.

The Ministry of Jacques Toubon was notable for a number of laws (the "Toubon Laws") enacted for the preservation of the French language, both in advertisements (all ads must include a French translation of foreign words) and on the radio (40% of songs on French radio stations must be in French), ostensibly in reaction to the presence of English.

=== Académie Française ===
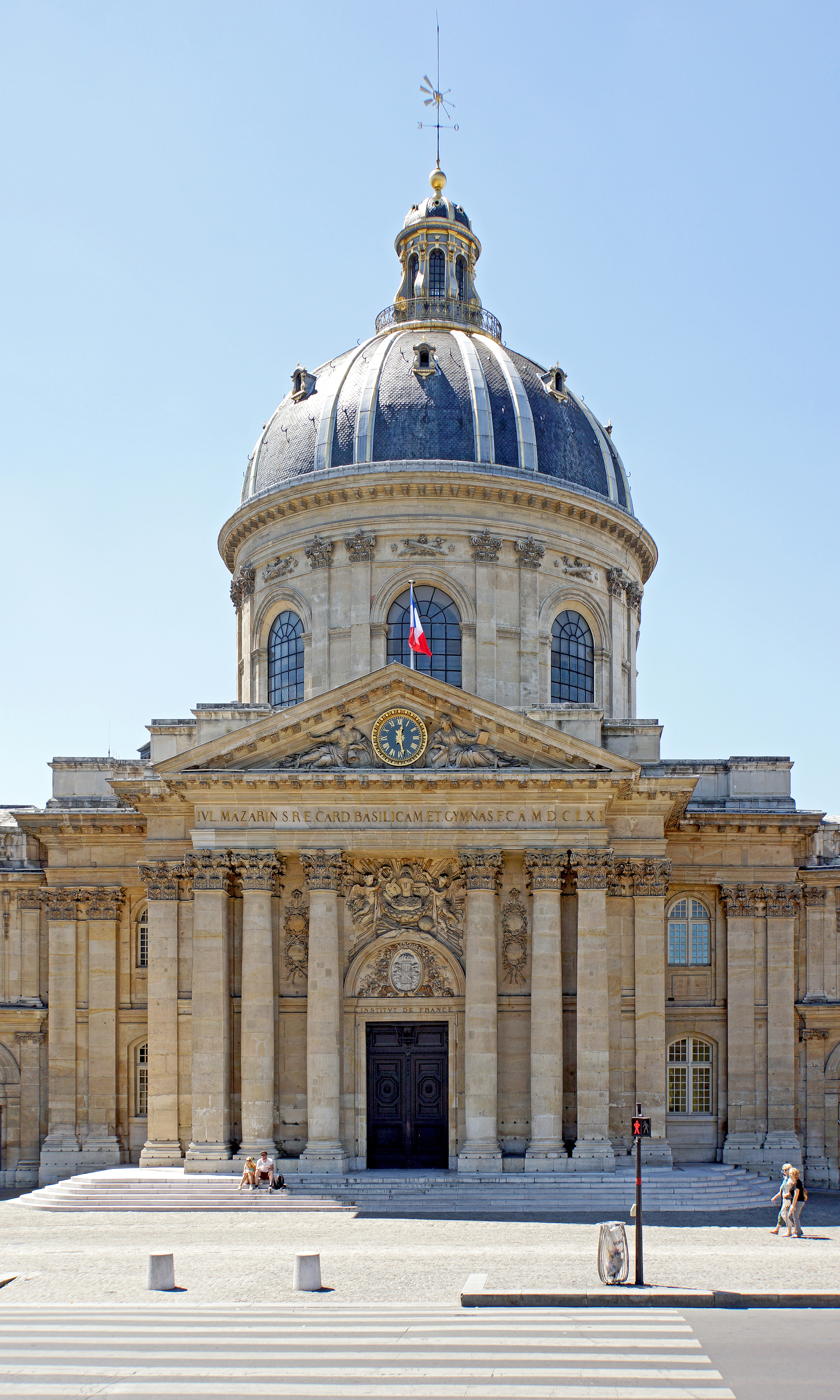
The Institut de France building, home to the Académie Française

The Académie Française (English: French Academy) is the pre-eminent French learned body on matters pertaining to the French language. The Académie was officially established in 1635 by Cardinal Richelieu, the chief minister to King Louis XIII. Suppressed in 1793 during the French Revolution, it was restored in 1803 by Napoleon Bonaparte (the Académie considers itself having been suspended, not suppressed, during the revolution). It is the oldest of the five académies of the Institut de France.

The Académie consists of forty members, known as immortels (immortals). New members are elected by the members of the Académie itself. Académicians hold office for life, but they may be removed for misconduct. The body has the task of acting as an official authority on the language; it is charged with publishing an official dictionary of the language. Its rulings, however, are only advisory; not binding on either the public or the government.

=== Military service ===
Until 1996, France had compulsory military service of young men. This has been credited by historians for further promoting a unified national identity and by breaking down regional isolationism.

=== Labour and employment policy ===
In France, the first labour laws were Waldeck Rousseau's laws passed in 1884. Between 1936 and 1938 the Popular Front enacted a law mandating 12 days (2 weeks) each year of paid vacation for workers, and a law limiting the work week to 40 hours, excluding overtime. The Grenelle accords negotiated on 25 and 26 May in the middle of the May 1968 crisis, reduced the working week to 44 hours and created trade union sections in each enterprise. The minimum wage was also increased by 25%. In 2000 Lionel Jospin's government then enacted the 35-hour workweek, down from 39 hours. Five years later, conservative prime minister Dominique de Villepin enacted the New Employment Contract (CNE). Addressing the demands of employers asking for more flexibility in French labour laws, the CNE sparked criticism from trade unions and opponents claiming it was lending favour to contingent work. In 2006 he then attempted to pass the First Employment Contract (CPE) through a vote by emergency procedure, but that it was met by students and unions' protests. President Jacques Chirac finally had no choice but to repeal it.

=== Healthcare and social welfare ===
The French are profoundly committed to the public healthcare system (called "sécurité sociale") and to their "pay-as-you-go" social welfare system.

In 1998, 75% of health payments in France were paid through the public healthcare system. Since 27 July 1999, France has a universal medical coverage for permanent residents in France (stable residence for more than three months). Using five performance indicators to measure health systems in 191 member states, it finds that France provides the best overall health care followed among major countries by Italy, Spain, Oman, Austria and Japan (The World Health Report).

== Lifestyle ==
=== Food and alcohol ===
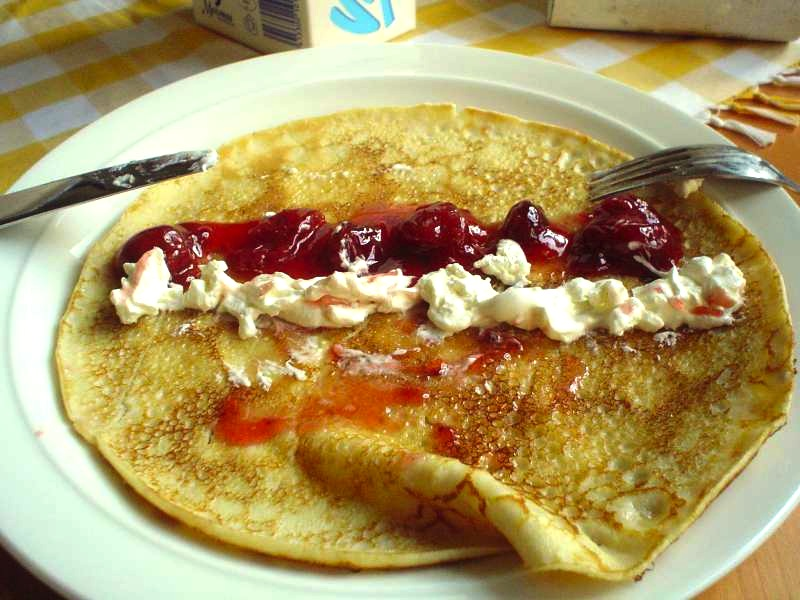
A sweet crêpe. Crêpes are originally from Brittany.

Traditional French culture places a high priority on the enjoyment of food. French cuisine was codified in the 20th century by Georges Auguste Escoffier to become the modern version of haute cuisine. Escoffier's major work, however, left out much of the regional character to be found in the provinces of France. Gastro-tourism and the Guide Michelin helped to bring people to the countryside during the 20th century and beyond, to sample this rich bourgeois and peasant cuisine of France. Basque cuisine has also been a great influence over the cuisine in the southwest of France.

Ingredients and dishes vary by region (see: Regional cuisine). There are many significant regional dishes that have become both national and regional. Many dishes that were once regional, however, have proliferated in different variations across the country in the present day. Cheese (see: List of French cheeses) and wine (see: French wine) are also a major part of the cuisine, playing different roles both regionally and nationally with their many variations and Appellation d'origine contrôlée (AOC) (regulated appellation) laws, (lentils from Le Puy-en-Velay also have an AOC status). Another French product of special note is the Charolais cattle.

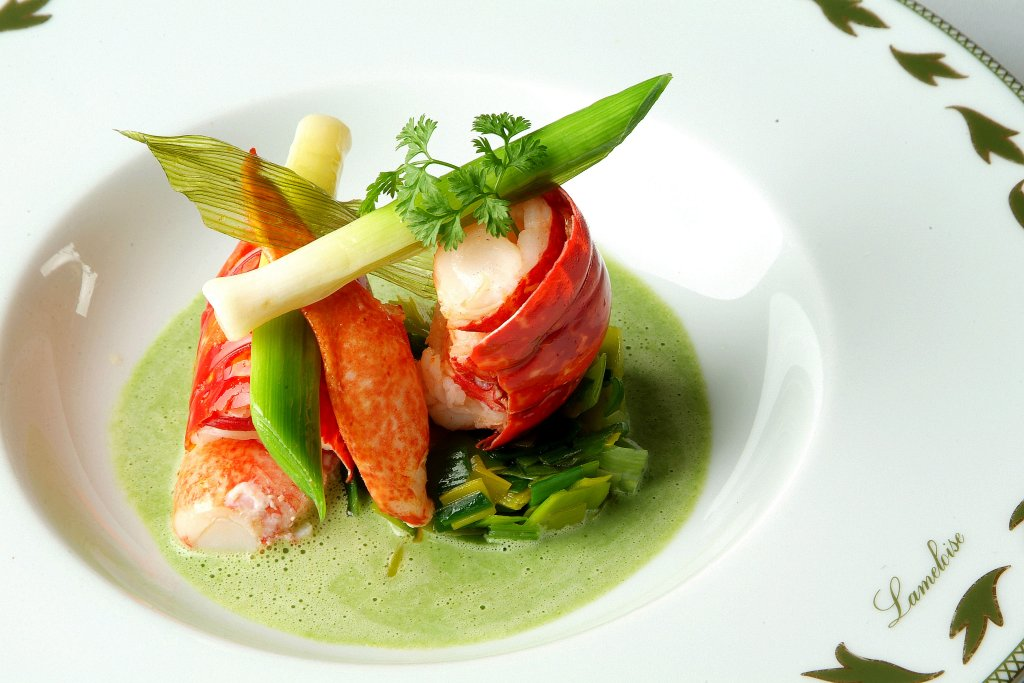
A nouvelle cuisine presentation

The French typically eat only a simple breakfast ("petit déjeuner") which consists of coffee, tea or hot chocolate with milk, served traditionally in a large handleless "bol" (bowl) and bread or breakfast pastries (croissants). Lunch ("déjeuner") and dinner ("dîner") are the main meals of the day. Formal four course meals consist of a starter course ("entrée"), a salad, a main course ("plat principal"), and finally a cheese or dessert course. While French cuisine is often associated with rich desserts, in most homes dessert consists of only fruit or yogurt.

Food shopping in France was formerly done almost daily in small local shops and markets, but the arrival of the supermarket and the even larger "hypermarchés" (large-surface distributors) in France have disrupted this tradition. With depopulation of the countryside, many towns have been forced to close shops and markets.

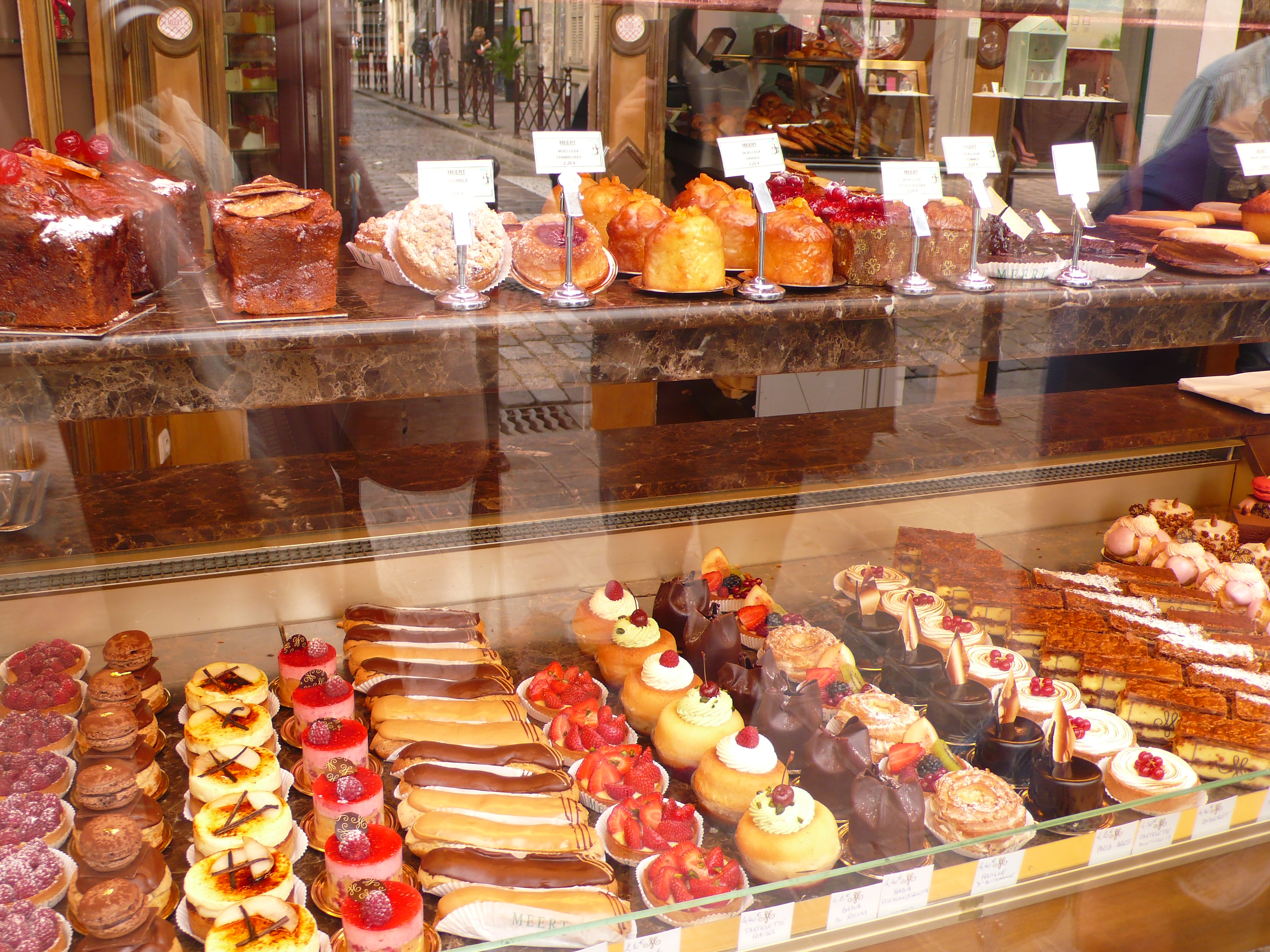
French pâtisserie play a role in traditional part in French culture

Rates of obesity and heart disease in France have traditionally been lower than in other north-western European countries. This is sometimes called the French paradox (see, for example, Mireille Guiliano's 2006 book French Women Don't Get Fat). French cuisine and eating habits have however come under great pressure in recent years from modern fast food, such as American products and the new global agricultural industry. While French youth culture has gravitated toward fast food and American eating habits (with an attendant rise in obesity), the French in general have remained committed to preserving certain elements of their food culture through such activities as including programs of taste acquisition in their public schools, by the use of the appellation d'origine contrôlée laws, and by state and European subsidies to the French agricultural industry. Emblematic of these tensions is the work of José Bové, who founded in 1987, the Confédération Paysanne, an agricultural union that places its highest political values on humans and the environment, promotes organic farming and opposes genetically modified organisms; Bové's most famous protest was the dismantling of a McDonald's franchise in Millau (Aveyron), in 1999.

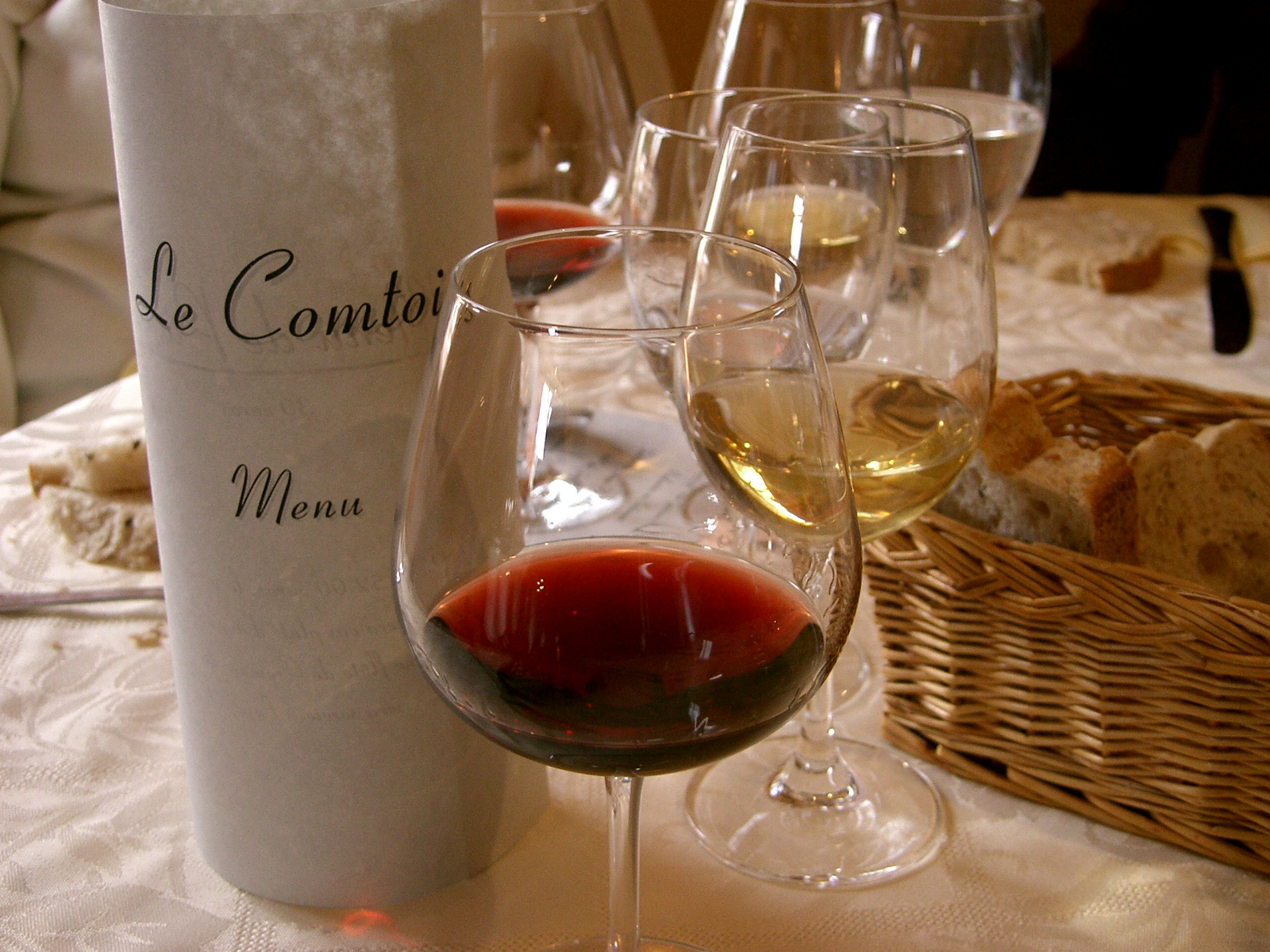
French wines are a traditional part of French cuisine.

In France, cutlery is used in the continental manner (with the fork in the left hand, prongs facing down and the knife in the right hand). French etiquette prohibits the placing of hands below the table and the placing of elbows on it.

The legal drinking age is officially 18 (see: Legal drinking age).

France is one of the oldest wine producing regions of Europe. France now produces the most wine by value in the world (although Italy rivals it by volume and Spain has more land under cultivation for wine grapes). Bordeaux wine, Bourgogne wine and Champagne are important agricultural products.

=== Tobacco and drugs ===
The cigarette smoking age is 18 years. According to a widespread cliché, smoking has been part of French culture – actually figures indicate that in terms of consumption per capita, France is only the 60th country out of 121.

France, from 1 February 2007, tightened the existing ban on smoking in public places found in the 1991 Évin law: Law n°91-32 of 10 January 1991, containing a variety of measures against alcoholism and tobacco consumption.

Smoking is now banned in all public places (stations, museums, etc.); an exception exists for special smoking rooms fulfilling drastic conditions, see below. A special exemption was made for cafés and restaurants, clubs, casinos, bars, etc. which ended, 1 January 2008. Opinion polls suggest 70% of people support the ban. Previously, under the former implementation rules of the 1991 Évin law, restaurants, cafés etc. just had to provide smoking and non-smoking sections, which in practice were often not well separated.

Under the new regulations, smoking rooms are allowed, but are subjected to very strict conditions: they may occupy at most 20% of the total floor space of the establishment and their size may not be more than 35 m^{2}; they need to be equipped with separate ventilation which replaces the full volume of air ten times per hour; the air pressure of the smoking room must constantly be lower than the pressure in the contiguous rooms; they have doors that close automatically; no service can be provided in the smoking rooms; cleaning and maintenance personnel may enter the room only one hour after it was last used for smoking.

Popular brands of cigarettes in France include Gauloises and Marlboro.

The possession, sale and use of cannabis (predominantly Moroccan hashish) is illegal in France. Since 1 March 1994, the penalties for cannabis use are from two months to a year and/or a fine, while possession, cultivation or trafficking of the drug can be punished much more severely, up to ten years. According to a 1992 survey by SOFRES, 4.7 million French people ages 12–44 have smoked cannabis at least once in their lives.

=== Sports and hobbies ===
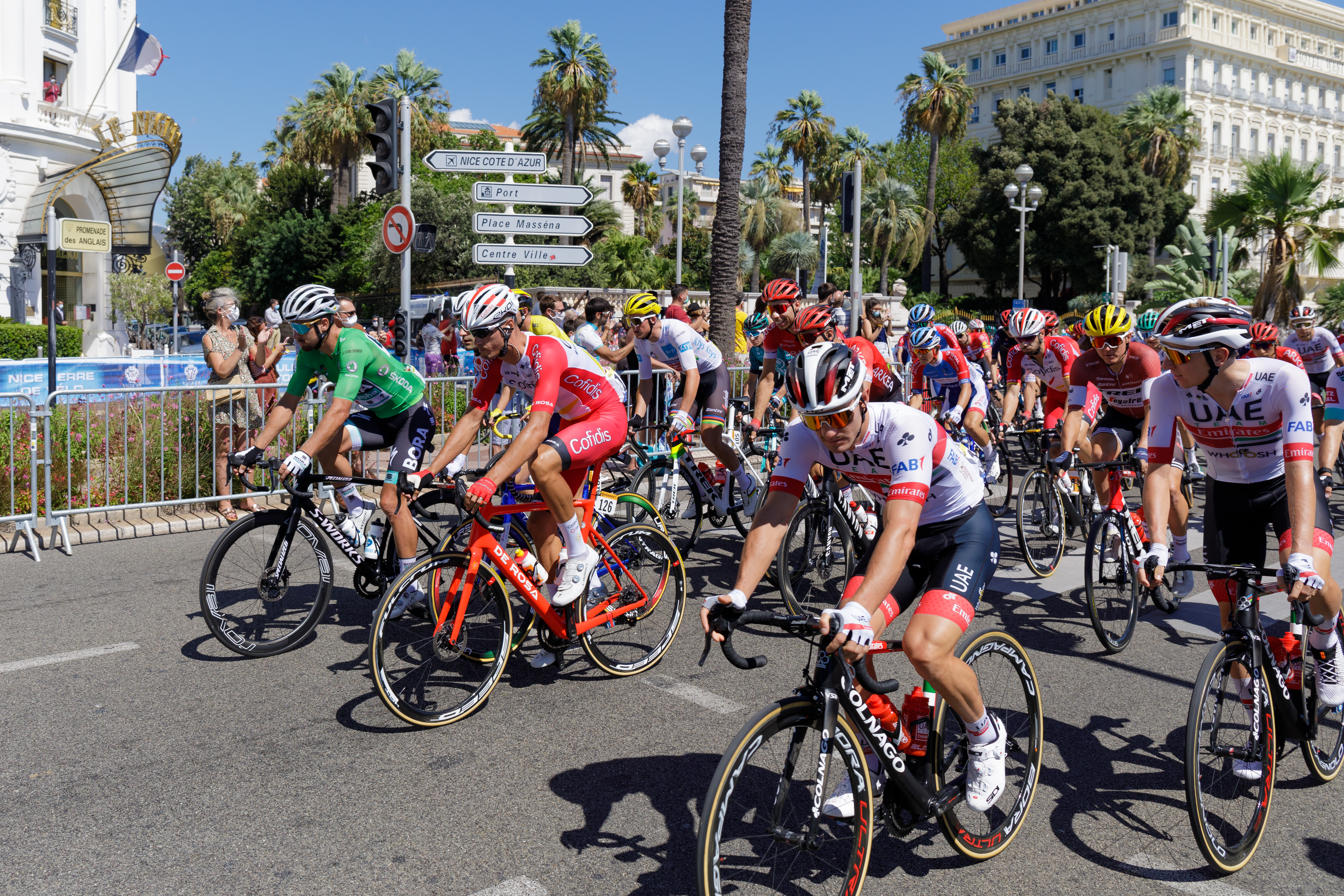
Starting in 1903, the Tour de France is the most prestigious of Grands Tours, and the world's most famous cycling race.

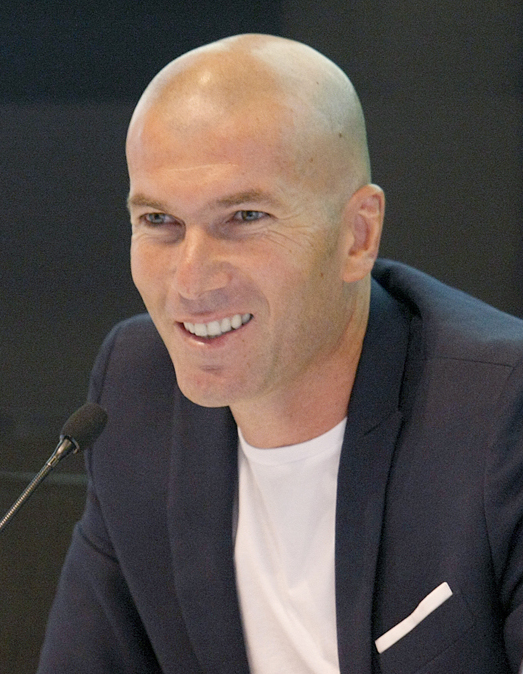
Zidane is regarded as one of the greatest footballers of all time

France hosts "the world's biggest annual sporting event", the annual cycling race Tour de France. Other popular sports played in France include: football, judo, tennis, rugby union and pétanque. France has hosted events such as the 1938 and 1998 FIFA World Cups, the 2007 Rugby World Cup, and the 2023 Rugby World Cup. The country also hosted the 1960 European Nations' Cup, UEFA Euro 1984, UEFA Euro 2016 and 2019 FIFA Women's World Cup. The Stade de France in Saint-Denis is France's largest stadium and was the venue for the 1998 FIFA World Cup and 2007 Rugby World Cup finals. Since 1923, France is famous for its 24 Hours of Le Mans sports car endurance race. Several major tennis tournaments take place in France, including the Paris Masters and the French Open, one of the four Grand Slam tournaments. French martial arts include Savate and Fencing.

France has a close association with the Modern Olympic Games; it was a French aristocrat, Baron Pierre de Coubertin, who suggested the Games' revival, at the end of the 19th century. After Athens was awarded the first Games, in reference to the Olympics' Greek origins, Paris hosted the second Games in 1900 (see: France at the Olympics). Paris was the first home of the International Olympic Committee, before it moved to Lausanne. Since 1900, France has hosted the Olympics on 5 further occasions: the 1924 and 2024 Summer Olympics, both in Paris and three Winter Games (1924 in Chamonix, 1968 in Grenoble and 1992 in Albertville). Similar to the Olympics, France introduced Olympics for deaf people (Deaflympics) in 1924 with the idea of a French deaf car mechanic, Eugène Rubens-Alcais who paved the way to organise the inaugural edition of the Summer Deaflympics in Paris.

Both the national football team and the national rugby union team are nicknamed "Les Bleus" in reference to the team's shirt colour as well as the national French tricolour flag. Football is the most popular sport in France, with over 1,800,000 registered players and over 18,000 registered clubs. While football is the most popular, rugby union and rugby league takes dominance in the southwest, especially around the city of Toulouse (see: Rugby union in France and Rugby league in France). The national rugby union team has competed at every Rugby World Cup; it takes part in the annual Six Nations Championship.

The French Open, also called Roland-Garros, is a major tennis tournament held over two weeks between late May and early June at the Stade Roland-Garros in Paris. It is the premier clay court tennis championship event in the world and the second of four annual Grand Slam tournaments.

Professional sailing in France is centred on singlehanded and shorthanded ocean racing with the pinnacle of this branch of the sport being the Vendée Globe singlehanded around the world race which starts every four years from the French Atlantic coast. Other significant events include the Solitaire du Figaro, Mini Transat 6.50, Tour Voile and Route du Rhum transatlantic race. France has been a regular competitor in the America's Cup since the 1970s.

Other important sports include:

- Skiing – France has an extensive number of ski resorts in the French alps such as Tignes. Ski resorts are also located in the Pyrénées and Vosges mountain chains.
- Parkour – Developed in France, Parkour is a training discipline with similarities to self-defense or martial arts.
- Babyfoot (table football) – A very popular pastime in bars and homes in France, and the French are the predominant winners of worldwide table football competitions.
- Kitesurfing
- Bullfighting – Spanish style bullfighting is still popular in the southern part of France.

Like other cultural areas in France, sport is overseen by a government ministry, the Minister of Youth Affairs and Sports, which is in charge of national and public sport associations, youth affairs, public sports centers and national stadia (like the Stade de France). Sport is encouraged in school, and local sports clubs receive financial support from the local governments.

=== Fashion ===
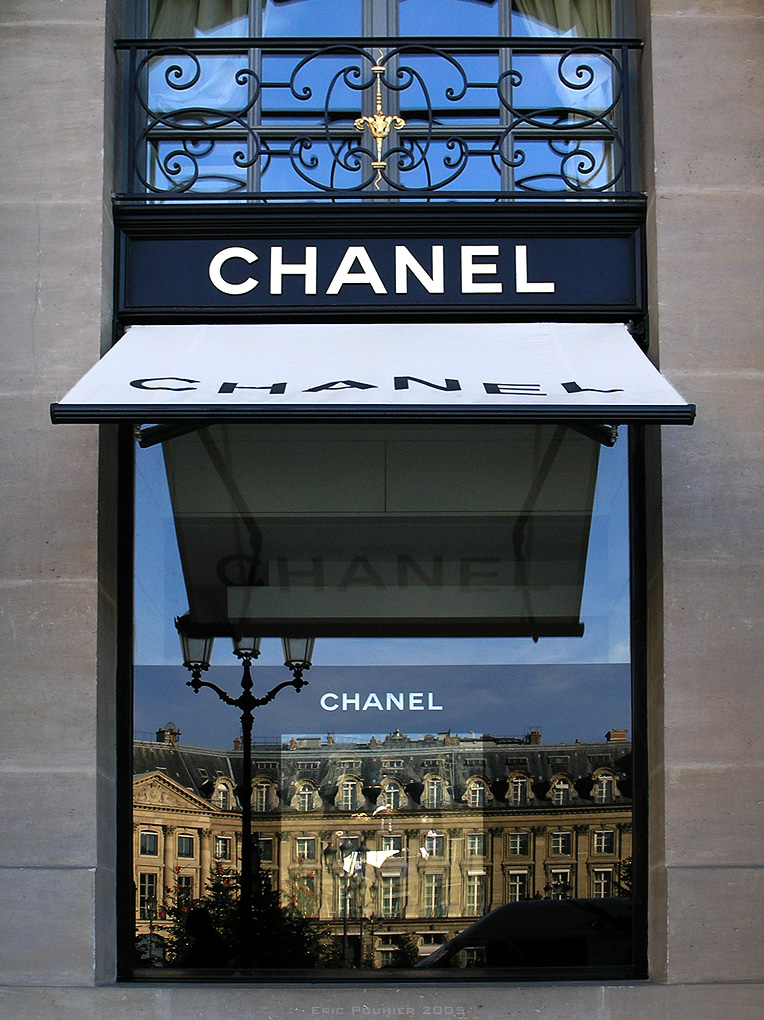
Chanel's headquarters on Place Vendôme, Paris

Along with Milan, London and New York, Paris is center of an important number of fashion shows. Some of the world's biggest fashion houses (e.g. Chanel) have their headquarters in France.

The association of France with fashion (la mode) dates largely to the reign of Louis XIV when the luxury goods industries in France came increasingly under royal control and the French royal court became, arguably, the arbiter of taste and style in Europe. France renewed its dominance of the high fashion (couture or haute couture) industry in the years 1860–1960 through the establishing of the great couturier houses, the fashion press (Vogue was founded in 1892; Elle was founded in 1945) and fashion shows. The first modern Parisian couturier house is generally considered the work of the Englishman Charles Frederick Worth who dominated the industry from 1858 to 1895. In the early twentieth century, the industry expanded through such Parisian fashion houses as the house of Chanel (which first came to prominence in 1925) and Balenciaga (founded by a Spaniard in 1937). In the post-war years, fashion returned to prominence through Christian Dior's famous "new look" in 1947, and through the houses of Pierre Balmain and Hubert de Givenchy (opened in 1952). In the 1960s, "high fashion" came under criticism from France's youth culture while designers like Yves Saint Laurent broke with established high fashion norms by launching prêt-à-porter ("ready to wear") lines and expanding French fashion into mass manufacturing and marketing. Further innovations were carried out by Paco Rabanne and Pierre Cardin. With a greater focus on marketing and manufacturing, new trends were established in the 1970s and 1980s by Sonia Rykiel, Thierry Mugler, Claude Montana, Jean Paul Gaultier and Christian Lacroix. The 1990s saw a conglomeration of many French couture houses under luxury giants and multinationals such as LVMH.

Since the 1960s, France's fashion industry has come under increasing competition from London, New York, Milan and Tokyo, and the French have increasingly adopted foreign (particularly American) fashions (such as jeans, tennis shoes). Nevertheless, many foreign designers still seek to make their careers in France.

=== Pets ===
In 2006, 52% of French households had at least one pet: In total, 9.7 million cats, 8.8 million dogs, 2.3 million rodents, 8 million birds, and 28 million fish were kept as pets in France during this year.

== Media and art ==
=== Art and museums ===
==== Art history ====
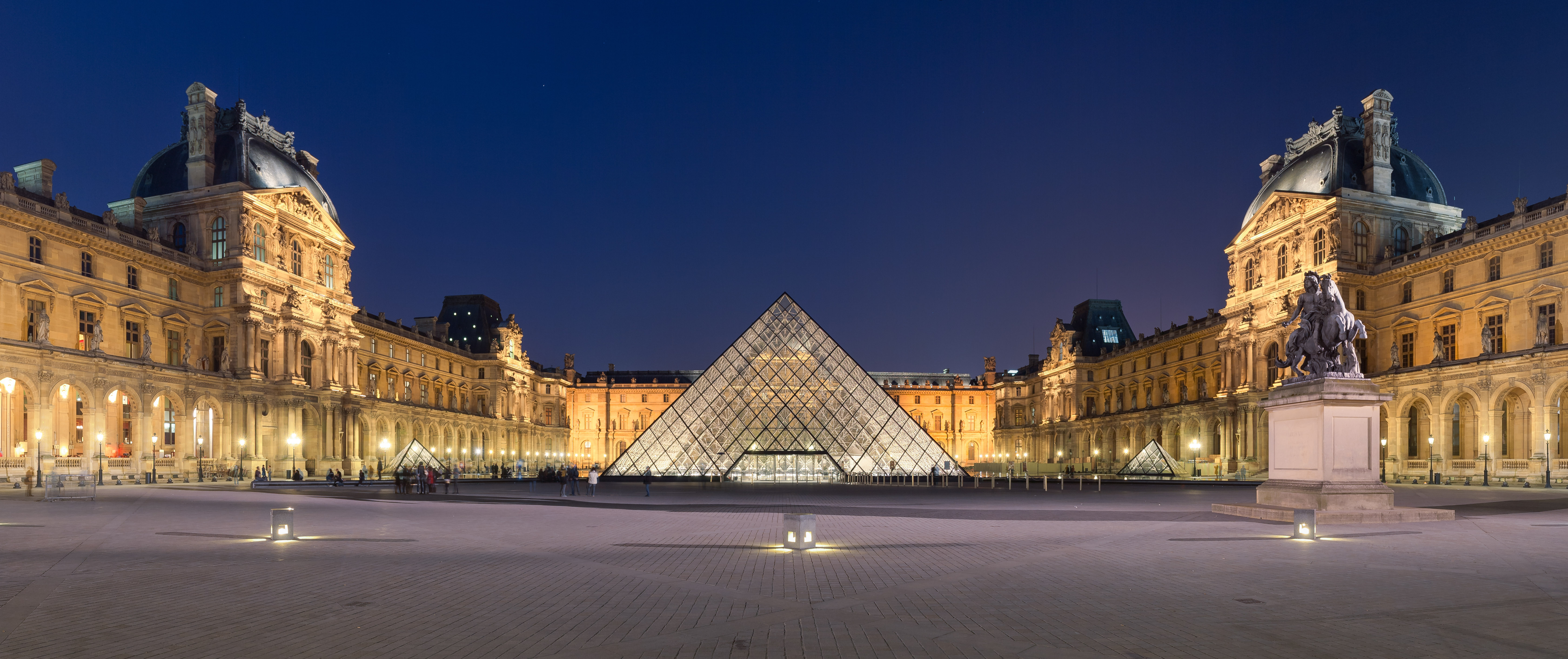
Musée du Louvre, Paris

The first paintings of France are those that are from prehistoric times, painted in the caves of Lascaux well over 10,000 years ago. The arts were already flourishing 1,200 years ago, at the time of Charlemagne, as can be seen in many hand made and hand illustrated books of that time.

Gothic art and architecture originated in France in the 12th century around Paris and then spread to all of Europe. In the 13th century, French craftsmen developed the stained glass painting technique and sophisticated illuminated manuscripts for private devotion in the new gothic style. The final phase of gothic architecture, known as Flamboyant, also began in France in the 15th century before spreading to the rest of Europe.

The 17th century was one of intense artistic achievements: French painting emerged with a distinct identity, moving from Baroque to Classicism. Famous classic painters of the 17th century in France are Nicolas Poussin and Claude Lorrain. French architecture also proved influential with the Palace of Versailles, built for the powerful king Louis XIV, becoming the model of many European royal palaces. During the 18th century the Rococo style emerged as a frivolous continuation of the Baroque style. The most famous painters of the era were Antoine Watteau, François Boucher and Jean-Honoré Fragonard. At the end of the century, Jacques-Louis David and Dominique Ingres were the most influential painters of the Neoclassicism.

Géricault and Delacroix were considered the most important painters of the Romanticism. Afterwards, the painters were more realistic, describing nature (Barbizon school). The realistic movement was led by Courbet and Honoré Daumier. Impressionism was developed in France by artists such as Claude Monet, Edgar Degas, Pierre-Auguste Renoir and Camille Pissarro. At the turn of the century, France had become more than ever the center of innovative art. The Spaniard Pablo Picasso came to France, like many other foreign artists, to deploy his talents there for decades to come. Toulouse-Lautrec, Gauguin and Cézanne were painting then. Cubism is an avant-garde movement born in Paris at the beginning of the 20th century.

In the early 20th century, a group of mostly foreign born artists who converged in Paris were dubbed the School of Paris by Andre Warnod. Amongst these artists, many of whom were Jews from Eastern Europe was an affinity for Expressionist art. Amongst the artists were Marc Chagall, Amedeo Modigliani, Yitzhak Frenel, Chaim Soutine, Jules Pascin and others.

==== Museums ====
The Louvre in Paris is one of the most famous and the largest art museums in the world, created by the new revolutionary regime in 1793 in the former royal palace. It holds a vast amount of art of French and other artists, e.g. the Mona Lisa, by Leonardo da Vinci, and classical Greek Venus de Milo and ancient works of culture and art from Egypt and the Middle East.

=== Music ===
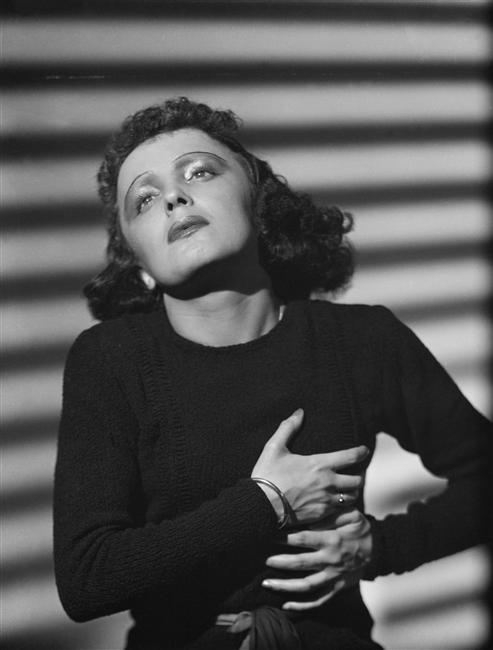
Édith Piaf referred to as "La Môme Piaf" (The Little Sparrow)

France has a long and varied musical history. It experienced a golden age in the 17th century thanks to Louis XIV, who employed talented musicians and composers in the royal court. The most renowned composers of this period include Marc-Antoine Charpentier, François Couperin, Michel-Richard Delalande, Jean-Baptiste Lully and Marin Marais, all of them composers at the court. After the death of the "Roi Soleil", French musical creation lost dynamism, but in the next century the music of Jean-Philippe Rameau reached some prestige, and he is still one of the most renowned French composers. Rameau became the dominant composer of French opera and the leading French composer of the harpsichord.

In the field of classical music, France has produced a number of notable composers such as Gabriel Fauré, Claude Debussy, Maurice Ravel, and Hector Berlioz. Claude Debussy and Maurice Ravel are the most prominent figures associated with Impressionist music. The two composers invented new musical forms and new sounds. Debussy was among the most influential composers of the late 19th and early 20th centuries, and his use of non-traditional scales and chromaticism influenced many composers who followed. His music is noted for its sensory content and frequent usage of atonality. Ravel's piano compositions, such as Jeux d'eau, Miroirs, Le tombeau de Couperin and Gaspard de la nuit, demand considerable virtuosity. His mastery of orchestration is evident in the Rapsodie espagnole, Daphnis et Chloé, his arrangement of Modest Mussorgsky's Pictures at an Exhibition and his orchestral work Boléro (1928). Erik Satie was a key member of the early-20th-century Parisian avant-garde. Francis Poulenc's best-known works are his piano suite Trois mouvements perpétuels (1919), the ballet Les biches (1923), the Concert champêtre (1928) for harpsichord and orchestra, the opera Dialogues des Carmélites (1957) and the Gloria (1959) for soprano, choir and orchestra. More recently, in the middle of the 20th century, Maurice Ohana, Pierre Schaeffer and Pierre Boulez contributed to the evolution of contemporary classical music.

French music then followed the rapid emergence of pop and rock music in the middle of the 20th century. Although English-speaking creations achieved popularity in the country, French pop music, known as chanson française, has also remained very popular. Among the most important French artists of the century are Édith Piaf, Georges Brassens, Léo Ferré, Charles Aznavour and Serge Gainsbourg. Modern pop music has seen the rise of popular French hip hop, French rock, techno/funk, and turntablists/DJs. Although there are very few rock bands in France compared to English-speaking countries, bands such as Noir Désir, Mano Negra, Niagara, Les Rita Mitsouko and more recently Superbus, Phoenix and Gojira, or Shaka Ponk, have reached worldwide popularity.

The Fête de la Musique was created in France (first held in 1982), a music festival, which has since become celebrated worldwide as world music day. It takes place every 21 June, on the first day of summer.

=== Cinema ===
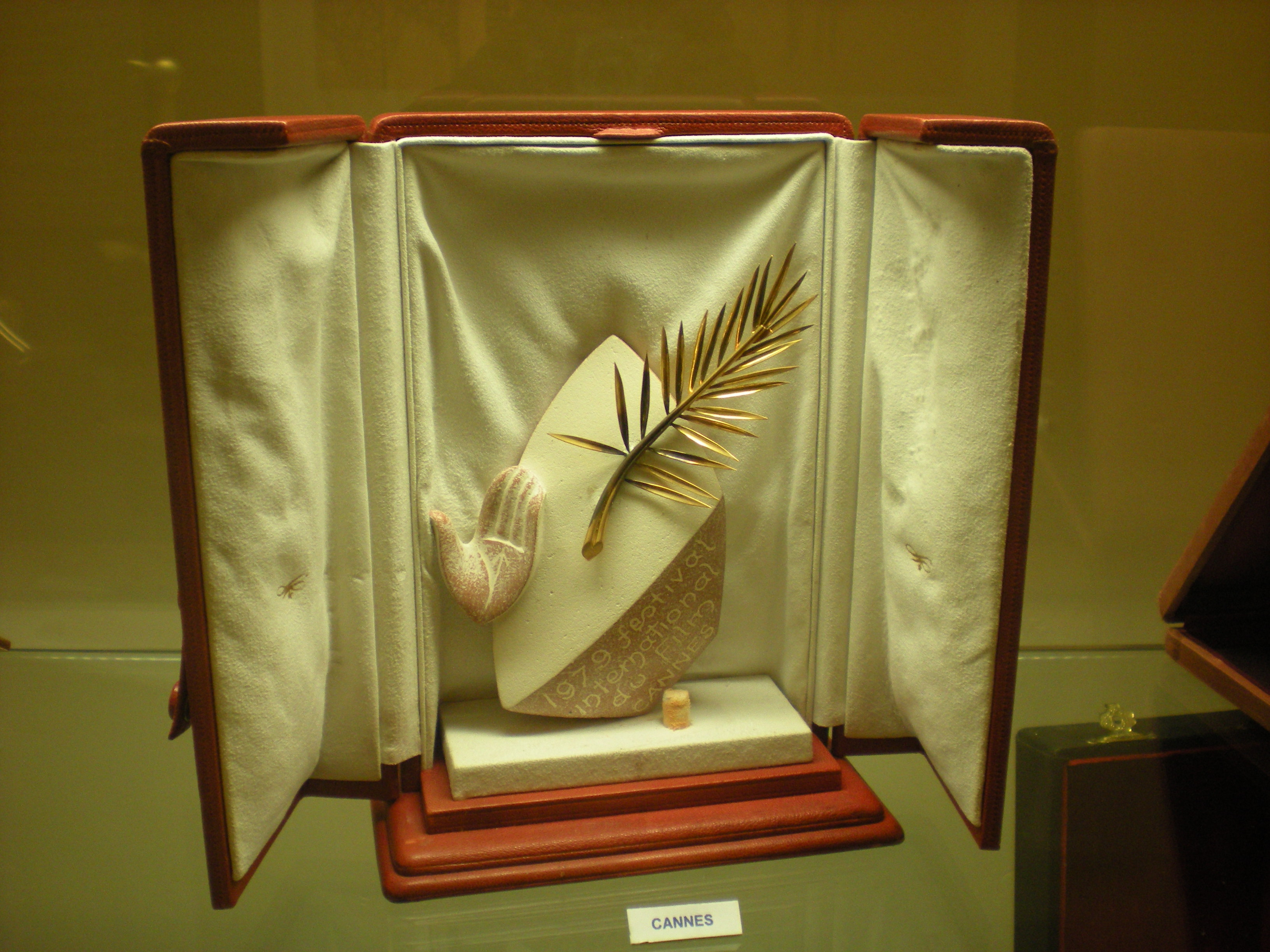
A Palme d'Or from the Cannes Film Festival, one of the "Big Three" film festivals alongside the Venice Film Festival and Berlin International Film Festival

France has historical and strong links with cinema, with two Frenchmen, Auguste and Louis Lumière (known as the Lumière Brothers) credited with creating cinema in 1895. The world's first female filmmaker, Alice Guy-Blaché, was also from France. Several important cinematic movements, including the late 1950s and 1960s Nouvelle Vague, began in the country. It is noted for having a strong film industry, due in part to protections afforded by the Government of France. Philippe Binant realized, on 2 February 2000, the first digital cinema projection in Europe, with the DLP CINEMA technology developed by Texas Instruments, in Paris.

France remains a leader in filmmaking, as of 2015 producing more films than any other European country. The nation also hosts the Cannes Festival, one of the most important and famous film festivals in the world. Additionally, France is an important Francophone film production country. A certain amount of the movies created share international distribution in the western hemisphere thanks to Unifrance. Although French cinema industry is rather small in terms of budget and revenues, it enjoys qualitative screenplay, cast and story telling. French cinema is often portrayed as more liberal in terms of subjects (e.g. sex, society, politics, historical, etc.).

Apart from its strong and innovative film tradition, France has also been a gathering spot for artists from across Europe and the world. For this reason, French cinema is sometimes intertwined with the cinema of foreign nations. Directors from nations such as Poland (Roman Polanski, Krzysztof Kieślowski, Andrzej Żuławski), Argentina (Gaspar Noé, Edgardo Cozarinsky), Russia (Alexandre Alexeieff, Anatole Litvak), Austria (Michael Haneke) and Georgia (Géla Babluani, Otar Iosseliani) are prominent in the ranks of French cinema. Conversely, French directors have had prolific and influential careers in other countries, such as Luc Besson, Jacques Tourneur or Francis Veber in the United States. Although the French film market is dominated by Hollywood, France is the only nation in the world where American films make up the smallest share of total film revenues, at 50%, compared with 77% in Germany and 69% in Japan. French films account for 35% of the total film revenues of France, which is the highest percentage of national film revenues in the developed world outside the United States, compared to 14% in Spain and 8% in the UK. In 2013 France was the second greatest exporter of films in the world, after the United States.

French major cinema operators are UGC and Pathé, mainly located in city suburbs due to the number of screens and seating capacity. Many "small" cinemas are located in the downtown parts of a city, resisting the big cinema operators nationwide. Paris has the highest density of cinemas in the world, and in most downtown Paris cinemas, foreign movies, which would be secluded to "art houses" cinemas in other places, are shown alongside "mainstream" works. The Cinémathèque Française holds one of the largest archives of films, movie documents and film-related objects in the world. Located in Paris, the Cinémathèque holds daily screenings of films unrestricted by country of origin.

As part of its advocacy of cultural exception, a political concept of treating culture differently from other commercial products, France succeeded in convincing all EU members to refuse to include culture and audiovisuals in the list of liberalised sectors of the WTO in 1993. Moreover, this decision was confirmed in a vote by UNESCO in 2005: the principle of "cultural exception" won an overwhelming victory with 198 countries voting for it and only 2 countries, the United States and Israel, voting against it.

=== Television ===
Arte's headquarters in Strasbourg

Just like many other European countries, France has public and private television channels. The public broadcasting corporation France Télévisions comprises the channels France 2, France 3, France 4, France 5 and France Info.

France Télévisions is also a shareholder of TV5Monde, Arte and the multilingual pan-European news channel Euronews. TV5Monde is a French-language common channel of France, Belgium and the French-speaking areas of Canada and Switzerland and, after the BBC, CNN and MIV, the fourth largest television network in the world. Arte is a German-French channel controlled by Arte France together with the German public broadcasting corporations ARD and ZDF.

The private broadcasting corporation TF1 is the largest television channel in France. TF1 was public until 1987. The corporation also controls the sports channel Eurosport. Other major private channels include M6 and Canal +.

BFM TV is an independent private news channel, which is also broadcast on the Internet – just like the French and English language news channel France 24, which has been broadcasting since December 2006 and is controlled by TF1 and France Télévisions.

=== Books, newspapers and magazines ===
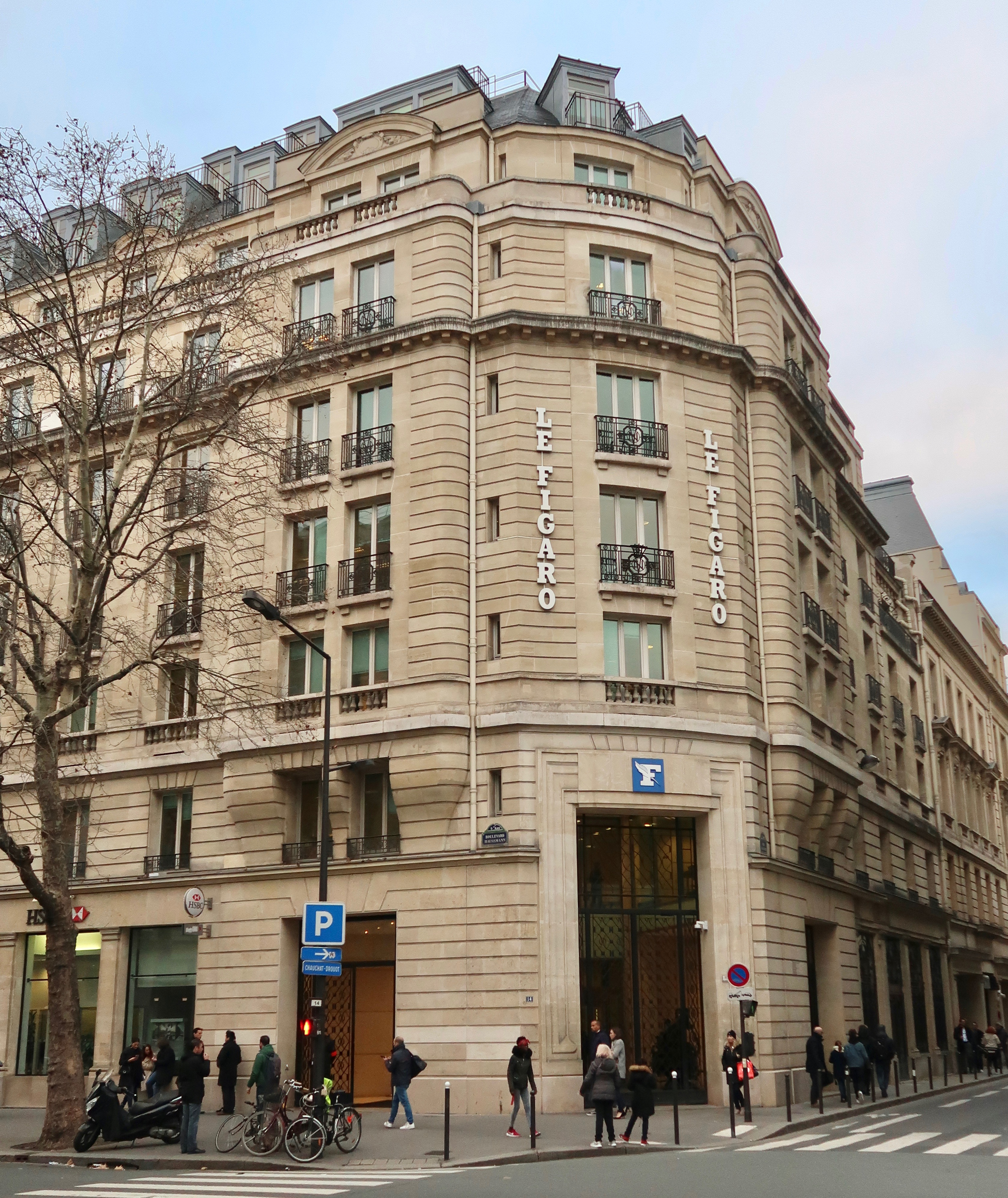
Le Figaro was founded in 1826 and it is still considered a newspaper of record.

France has the reputation of being a "literary culture", and this image is reinforced by such things as the importance of French literature in the French educational system, the attention paid by the French media to French book fairs and book prizes (like the Prix Goncourt, Prix Renaudot or Prix Femina) and by the popular success of the (former) literary television show "Apostrophes" (hosted by Bernard Pivot).

Although the official literacy rate of France is 99%, some estimates have placed functional illiteracy at between 10% and 20% of the adult population (and higher in the prison population).

While reading remains a favorite pastime of French youth today, surveys show that it has decreased in importance compared to music, television, sports and other activities. The crisis of academic publishing has also hit France (see, for example, the financial difficulties of the Presses universitaires de France (PUF), France's premier academic publishing house, in the 1990s).

Literary taste in France remains centered on the novel (26.4% of book sales in 1997), although the French read more non-fiction essays and books on current affairs than the British or Americans. Contemporary novels, including French translations of foreign novels, lead the list (13% of total books sold), followed by sentimental novels (4.1%), detective and spy fiction (3.7%), "classic" literature (3.5%), science fiction and horror (1.3%) and erotic fiction (0.2%). About 30% of all fiction sold in France today is translated from English (authors such as William Boyd, John le Carré, Ian McEwan, Paul Auster and Douglas Kennedy are well received).

An important subset of book sales is comic books (typically Franco-Belgian comics like The Adventures of Tintin and Astérix) which are published in a large hardback format; comic books represented 4% of total book sales in 1997. French artists have made the country a leader in the graphic novel genre and France hosts the Angoulême International Comics Festival, Europe's preeminent comics festival.

Like other areas of French culture, book culture is influenced, in part, by the state, in particular by the "Direction du livre et de la lecture" of the Ministry of Culture, which oversees the "Centre national du livre" (National Book Center). The French Ministry of Industry also plays a role in price control. Finally, the VAT for books and other cultural products in France is at the reduced rate of 5.5%, which is also that of food and other necessities (see here).

In terms of journalism in France, the regional press (see list of newspapers in France) has become more important than national dailies (such as Le Monde and Le Figaro) over the past century: in 1939, national dailies were 2/3 of the dailies market, while today they are less than 1/4. The magazine market is currently dominated by TV listings magazines followed by news magazines such as L'Obs, L'Express and Le Point.

== Architecture and housing ==
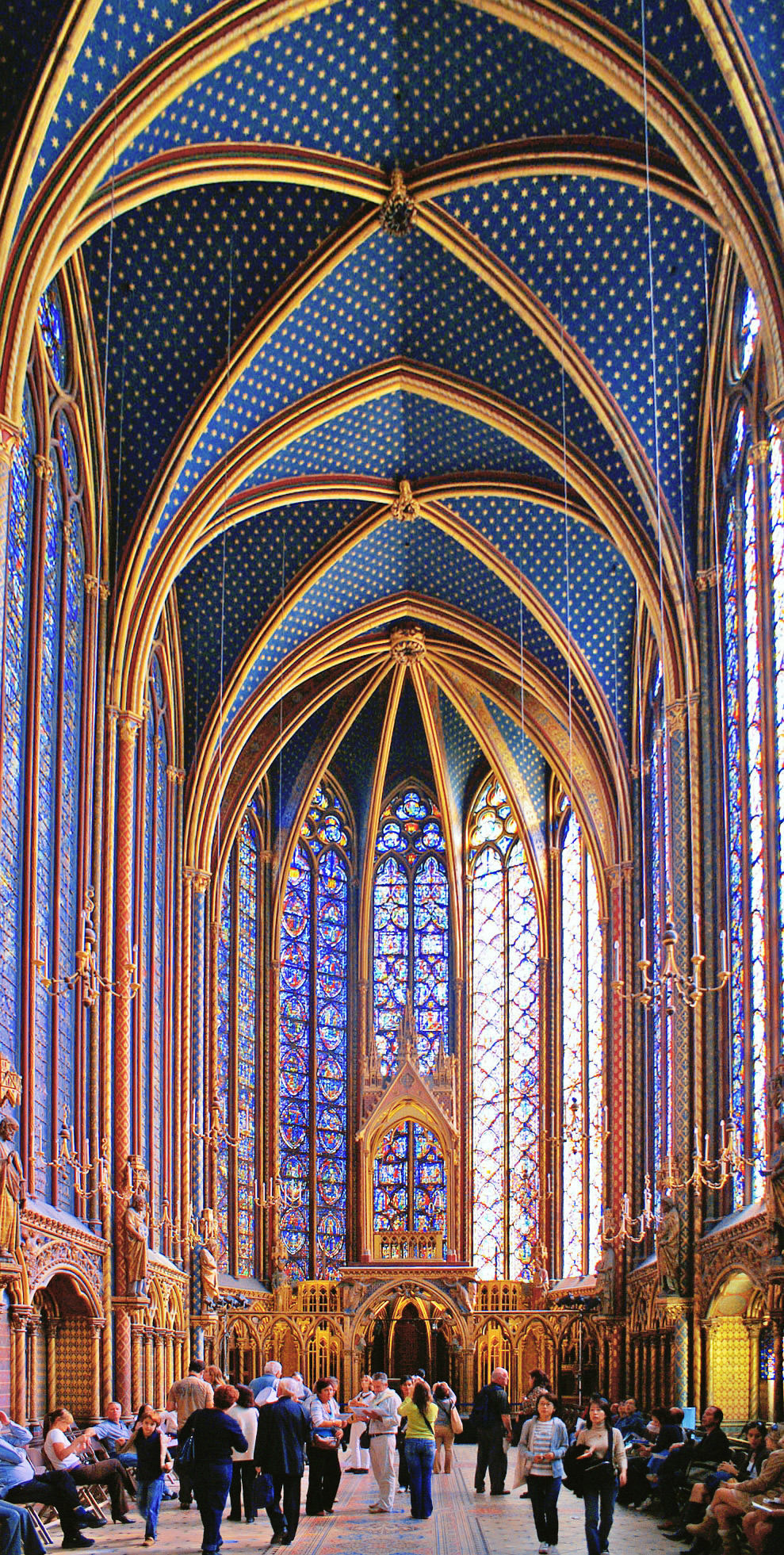
Saint Louis' Sainte-Chapelle represents the French impact on religious architecture.

During the Middle Ages, many fortified castles were built by feudal nobles to mark their powers. Some French castles that survived are Chinon, Château d'Angers, the massive Château de Vincennes and the so-called Cathar castles. During this era, France had been using Romanesque architecture like most of Western Europe.

Gothic architecture, originally named Opus Francigenum meaning "French work", was born in Île-de-France and was the first French style of architecture to be imitated throughout Europe. Northern France is the home of some of the most important Gothic cathedrals and basilicas, the first of these being the Saint Denis Basilica (used as the royal necropolis); other important French Gothic cathedrals are Notre-Dame de Chartres and Notre-Dame d'Amiens. The kings were crowned in another important Gothic church: Notre-Dame de Reims.

The final victory in the Hundred Years' War marked an important stage in the evolution of French architecture. It was the time of the French Renaissance and several artists from Italy were invited to the French court; many residential palaces were built in the Loire Valley, from 1450 as a first reference the Château de Montsoreau. Examples of such residential castles include the Château de Chambord, the Château de Chenonceau, or the Château d'Amboise.

Following the Renaissance and the end of the Middle Ages, Baroque architecture replaced the traditional Gothic style. However, in France, Baroque architecture found greater success in the secular domain than in the religious one. In the secular domain, the Palace of Versailles has many Baroque features. Jules Hardouin Mansart, who designed the extensions to Versailles, was one of the most influential French architects of the Baroque era; he is famous for his dome at Les Invalides. Some of the most impressive provincial Baroque architecture is found in places that were not yet French such as Place Stanislas in Nancy. On the military architectural side, Vauban designed some of the most efficient fortresses in Europe and became an influential military architect; as a result, imitations of his works can be found all over Europe, the Americas, Russia and Turkey.

After the Revolution, the Republicans favoured Neoclassicism although it was introduced in France before the revolution with such buildings as the Parisian Pantheon or the Capitole de Toulouse. Built during the first French Empire, the Arc de Triomphe and Sainte Marie-Madeleine represent the best example of Empire-style architecture. Under Napoleon III, a new wave of urbanism and architecture was given birth; extravagant buildings such as the neo-Baroque Palais Garnier were built. The urban planning of the time was very organised and rigorous; most notably, Haussmann's renovation of Paris. The architecture associated with this era is named Second Empire in English, the term being taken from the Second French Empire. At this time there was a strong Gothic resurgence across Europe and in France; the associated architect was Eugène Viollet-le-Duc. In the late 19th century, Gustave Eiffel designed many bridges, such as the Garabit viaduct, and remains one of the most influential bridge designers of his time, although he is best remembered for the Eiffel Tower.

In the 20th century, French-Swiss architect Le Corbusier designed several buildings in France. More recently, French architects have combined both modern and old architectural styles. The Louvre Pyramid is an example of modern architecture added to an older building. The most difficult buildings to integrate within French cities are skyscrapers, as they are visible from afar. For instance, in Paris, since 1977, new buildings had to be under 37 metres (121 ft). France's largest financial district is La Défense, where a significant number of skyscrapers are located. Other massive buildings that are a challenge to integrate into their environment are large bridges; an example of the way this has been done is the Millau Viaduct. Some famous modern French architects include Jean Nouvel, Dominique Perrault, Christian de Portzamparc and Paul Andreu.

== Transportation ==
There are significant differences in lifestyles with respect to transportation between very urbanized regions such as Paris, and smaller towns and rural areas. In Paris, and to a lesser extent in other major cities, many households do not own an automobile and simply use efficient public transport. The cliché about the Parisien is rush hour in the Métro subway. However, outside of such areas, ownership of one or more cars is standard, especially for households with children.

=== Odonymy ===
France has a number of traditional road naming conventions.

== Holidays ==
Despite the principles of laïcité and the separation of church from state, public and school holidays in France generally follow the Roman Catholic religious calendar (including Easter, Christmas, Ascension Day, Pentecost, Assumption of Mary, All Saints Day, etc.). Labor Day and the National Holiday are the only business holidays determined by government statute; the other holidays are granted by convention collective (agreement between employers' and employees' unions) or by agreement of the employer.

The five holiday periods of the public school year are:

- the vacances de la Toussaint (All Saints Day) – two weeks starting near the end of October.
- the vacances de Noël (Christmas) – two weeks, ending after New Years.
- the vacances d'hiver (winter) – two weeks in February and March.
- the vacances de printemps (spring), formerly vacances de Pâques (Easter) – two weeks in April and May.
- the vacances d'été (summer), or grandes vacances (literally: big holidays) – two months in July and August.

On 1 May, Labour Day (La Fête du Travail) the French give flowers of Lily of the Valley (Le Muguet) to one another.

The National holiday (called Bastille Day in English) is on 14 July. Military parades, called Défilés du 14 juillet, are held, the largest on the Champs-Élysées avenue in Paris in front of the President of the Republic.

On 2 November, All Souls Day (La Fête des morts), the French traditionally bring chrysanthemums to the tombs of departed family members.

On 11 November, Remembrance Day (Le Jour de la Commémoration or L' Armistice) is an official holiday.

Christmas is generally celebrated in France on Christmas Eve by a traditional meal (typical dishes include oysters, boudin blanc and the bûche de Noël), by opening presents and by attending the midnight mass (even among Catholics who do not attend church at other times of the year).

Candlemas (La Chandeleur) is celebrated with crêpes. The popular saying is that if the cook can flip a crêpe singlehandedly with a coin in the other hand, the family is assured of prosperity throughout the coming year.

The Celtic holiday Halloween, which is popular throughout the English-speaking world, has grown in popularity following its introduction in the mid-1990s by the trade associations. The growth seems to have stalled during the following decade.

== Conventions ==
- France is the home of the International System of Units (the metric system). Some pre-metric units are still used, essentially the livre (a unit of weight equal to half a kilogram) and the quintal (a unit of weight equal to 100 kilograms).
- In mathematics, France uses the infix notation like most countries. For large numbers the long scale is used. Thus, the French use the word billion for the number 1,000,000,000,000, which in countries using short scale is called a trillion. However, there exists a French word, milliard, for the number 1,000,000,000, which in countries using the short scale is called a billion. Thus, despite the use of the long scale, one billion is called un milliard ("one milliard") in French, and not mille millions ("one thousand million"). It should also be noted that names of numbers above the milliard are rarely used. Thus, one trillion will most often be called mille milliards ("one thousand milliard") in French, and rarely un billion.
- In the French numeral notation, the comma (,) is the decimal separator, whereas a space is used between each group of three digits (fifteen million five hundred thousand and thirty-two should be written as 15 500 032). In finance, the currency symbol is put after the number. For example, €25,048.05 (English) is written as 25 048,05 € (always with a non-breaking space between the figure and the currency symbol).
- In computing, a bit is called a bit yet a byte is called an octet (from the Latin root octo, meaning "8"). SI prefixes are used.
- 24-hour clock time is used, with h (from heure "hour") or a colon (:) being the separator between hours and minutes (for example 2:30 pm is 14:30 or 14 h 30).
- The all-numeric form for dates is in the order day-month-year, using a slash as the separator (example: 31 December 1992 or 31/12/1992).

== Problem in defining "French" culture ==
Wherever one comes from, "culture" consists of beliefs and values learned through the socialization process as well as material artifacts. "Culture is the learned set of beliefs, values, norms and material goods shared by group members. Culture consists of everything we learn in groups during the life course-from infancy to an old age."

The conception of "French" culture however poses certain difficulties and presupposes a series of assumptions about what precisely the expression "French" means. Whereas American culture posits the notion of the "melting-pot" and cultural diversity, the expression "French culture" tends to refer implicitly to a specific geographical entity (as, say, "metropolitan France", generally excluding its overseas departments) or to a specific historico-sociological group defined by ethnicity, language, religion and geography. The realities of "Frenchness" however, are extremely complicated. Even before the late 18th–19th century, "metropolitan France" was largely a patchwork of local customs and regional differences that the unifying aims of the Ancien Régime and the French Revolution had only begun to work against, and today's France remains a nation of numerous indigenous and foreign languages, of multiple ethnicities and religions, and of regional diversity that includes French citizens in Corsica, Guadeloupe, Martinique and elsewhere around the globe also in America.

The creation of some sort of typical or shared French culture or "cultural identity", despite this vast heterogeneity, is the result of powerful internal forces – such as the French educational system, mandatory military service, state linguistic and cultural policies – and by profound historic events – such as the Franco-Prussian war and the two World Wars — which have forged a sense of national identity over the last 200 years. However, despite these unifying forces, France today still remains marked by social class and by important regional differences in culture (cuisine, dialect/accent, local traditions) that many fear will be unable to withstand contemporary social forces (depopulation of the countryside, immigration, centralization, market forces and the world economy).

In recent years, to fight the loss of regional diversity, many in France have promoted forms of multiculturalism and encouraged cultural enclaves (communautarisme), including reforms on the preservation of regional languages and the decentralization of certain government functions, but French multiculturalism has had a harder time of accepting, or of integrating into the collective identity, the large non-Christian and immigrant communities and groups that have come to France since the 1960s.

The last 70 years has also seen French cultural identity "threatened" by global market forces and by American "cultural hegemony". Since its dealings with the 1943 GATT free trade negotiations, France has fought for what it calls the exception culturelle, meaning the right to subsidize or treat favorably domestic cultural production and to limit or control foreign cultural products (as seen in public funding for French cinema or the lower VAT accorded to books). The notion of an explicit exception française however has angered many of France's critics.

The French are often perceived as taking a great pride in national identity and the positive achievements of France (the expression "chauvinism" is of French origin) and cultural issues are more integrated in the body of the politics than elsewhere (see "The Role of the State", above). The French Revolution claimed universalism for the democratic principles of the Republic. Charles de Gaulle actively promoted a notion of French "grandeur" ("greatness"). Perceived declines in cultural status are a matter of national concern and have generated national debates, both from the left (as seen in the anti-globalism of José Bové) and from the right and far right (as in the discourses of the National Front).

According to Hofstede's Framework for Assessing Culture, the culture of France is moderately individualistic and high Power Distance Index.

Now, the interracial blending of some native French and newcomers stands as a vibrant and boasted feature of French culture, from popular music to movies and literature. Therefore, alongside mixing of populations, exists also a cultural blending (le métissage culturel) that is present in France. It may be compared to the traditional US conception of the melting-pot. The French culture might have been already blended in from other races and ethnicities, in cases of some biographical research on the possibility of African ancestry on a small number of famous French citizens. Author Alexandre Dumas possessed one-fifth black Haitian descent, and Joséphine de Beauharnais, Empress to Napoleon, who was born and raised in the French West Indies from a plantation estate family. We can mention as well, the most famous French-Canadian singer Celine Dion whose grandmother was a North African from Kabylie.

For a long time, the only objection to such outcomes predictably came from the far-left schools of thought. In the past few years, other unexpected voices are however beginning to question what they interpret, as the new philosopher Alain Finkielkraut coined the term, as an "Ideology of miscegenation" (une idéologie du métissage) that may come from what one other philosopher, Pascal Bruckner, defined as The Tears of the White Man (le sanglot de l'homme blanc). These critics have been dismissed by the mainstream and their propagators have been labelled as new reactionaries (les nouveaux réactionnaires), even if racist and anti-immigration sentiment has recently been documented to be increasing in France at least according to one poll.

== Cultural influence abroad ==
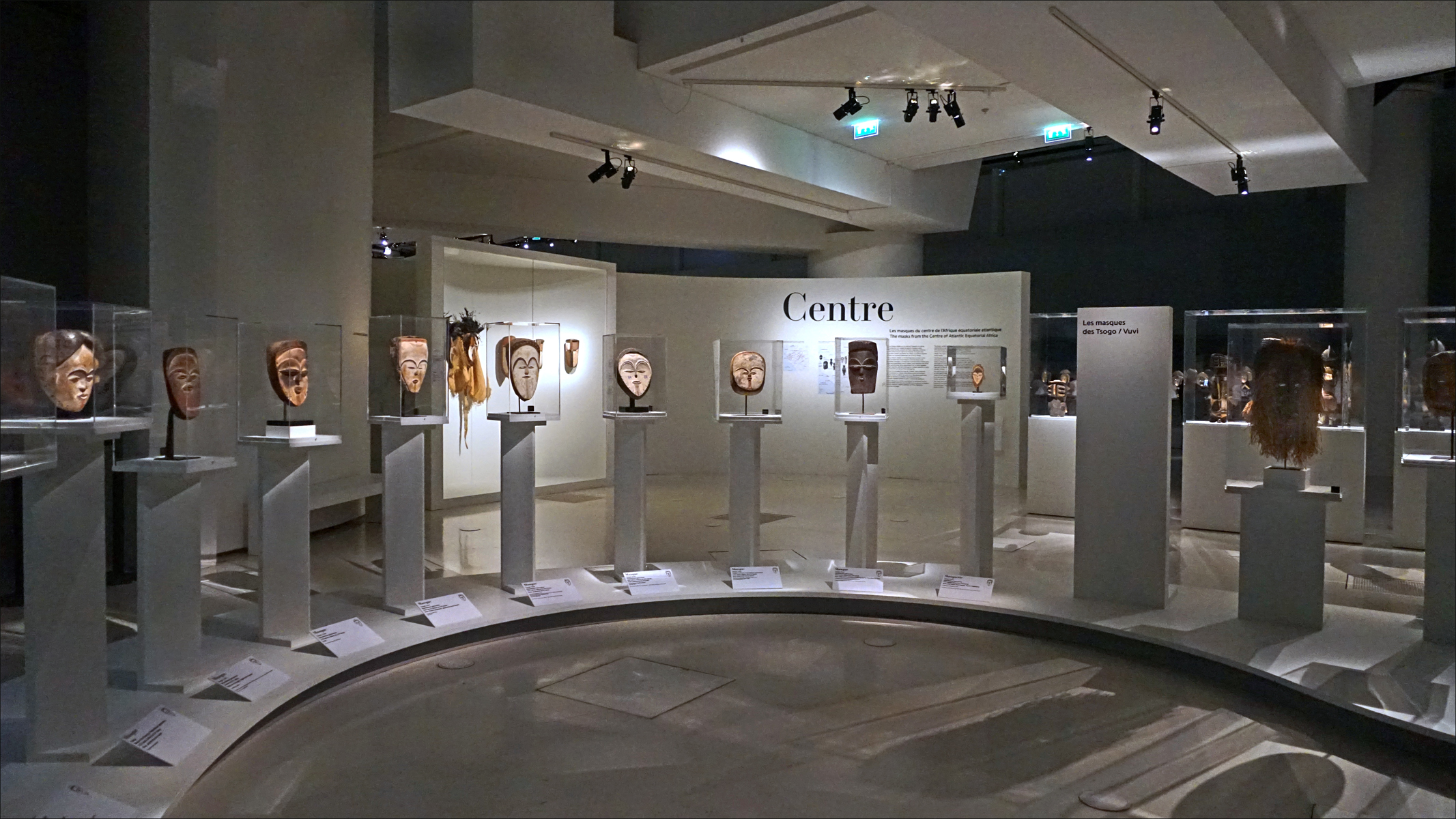
Ethnographic museums such as the Musée du Quai Branly – Jacques Chirac have been criticized for the political role they play in France.

French culture, language, and education have been mobilized to further French imperial interests up to the mid-20th century The concept of mission civilisatrice or 'civilizing mission' figured in France's politique indigène throughout its colonies, with its goal fluctuating between assimilation and association of colonial subjects with French culture. Aspects of French cultural influence—as embodied in the Organisation internationale de la Francophonie or Françafrique—have endured beyond the decolonization period.

Transformations in French ethnographic museums since the early 2000s have been met with criticism of their alleged political role: reconciling increasing ethnic diversity among the nation's population within its republican model of assimilation, and even homogeneity. These criticisms have also included allegations of an erasure of France's colonial past as well as an erasure of the history of the collections.

== Culture of Overseas France ==
Culture within European France and Overseas France differs. Overseas France consists of 13 French-administered territories outside Europe, mostly the remains of the French colonial empire that remained a part of the French state under various statuses after decolonization. Overseas French cultures include the cultures of Martinique and Guadeloupe in the Caribbean, the Culture of French Guiana in South America, the blend of European, African, Indian, Chinese and insular traditions in Reunion, the East African, Comorian and Malagasyian traditions in Mayotte, the Polynesian cultures of French Polynesia, and the mix of indigenous Kanak, European, and Polynesian cultures of New Caledonia.

== See also ==
- French art
- Art in Paris
- Architecture of Normandy
- Catherinettes
- Demographics of France
- Remarkable Gardens of France
- List of French people
- List of libraries in France
- List of World Heritage Sites in France
