= French labour law =

Overview of the labour law of France

French labour law is the system of labour law operating in France.

== History ==
During the French Revolution, the Le Chapelier Law 1791 was passed to prohibit unions or guilds and strikes in particular, with a proclamation of "free enterprise". On 25 May 1864, the loi Ollivier was passed to reverse the prohibitions on strike action.

The prohibitions on forming trade unions were lifted by the Waldeck Rousseau laws passed on 21 March 1884.

Additional labor laws were introduced during the Twentieth Century. Between 1936 and 1938 the Popular Front enacted a law mandating 12 days (2 weeks) each year of paid vacation for workers, and the Matignon Accords (1936). This established the right to organise a union, to bargain collectively, a legal right to strike, and was followed by enactments which limited the work week to 40 hours, excluding overtime, and guaranteed paid holidays. The Grenelle agreements negotiated on 25 and 26 May, in the middle of the May 1968 crisis, reduced the working week to 44 hours and created trade union sections in each enterprise. The minimum wage was also increased by 25%.

In 2000 Lionel Jospin's government then enacted the 35-hour workweek, down from 39 hours. Five years later, conservative prime minister Dominique de Villepin enacted the New Employment Contract (CNE). Addressing the demands of employers asking for more flexibility in French labour laws, the CNE sparked criticism from trade unions and opponents claiming it was lending favour to contingent work. In 2006 he then attempted to pass the First Employment Contract (CPE) through a vote by emergency procedure, but that it was met by students and unions' protests. President Jacques Chirac finally had no choice but to repeal it.

The "right to disconnect" law came into force in January 2017, which means that companies with more than 50 workers will be obliged to draw up a charter of good conduct. This charter sets out the hours in which staff are not supposed to send or answer emails.

- June Days Uprising (1848)
- Champagne Riots (1910-1911)
- LIP (company) (1974-1976)

== French Labour Code ==
The French Labour Code (code du travail) is the national which governs work and labor relations in the country.

=== Individual rights ===
- First Employment Contract, a law to remove job security for young workers, defeated by protests in 2006.
- Contrat nouvelle embauche

=== Enforcement ===
In France, the Inspection du travail is the body responsible for checking whether the provisions of the Labour Code or collective agreements are correctly applied in companies.

The labor inspectors primarily control whether companies apply the Labour Code on all points : employment contracts, illegal work, working hours, etc. However, the Inspection du travail cannot resolve disputes related to the employment contract, as this is the role of the Labour Court.

== Pensions ==
- French special retirement plan, for public sector workers

== Unemployment protection ==
- Unemployment benefits in France
- Agence nationale pour l'emploi (1967-2008)
- Pôle emploi (est 2009)

== See also ==
- Mr T v. Cubik Partners
- Social security in France
- German labour law
- United Kingdom labour law
- United States labor law
- Labor Code (France)
