= El Khomri law =

French legislation to protect workers

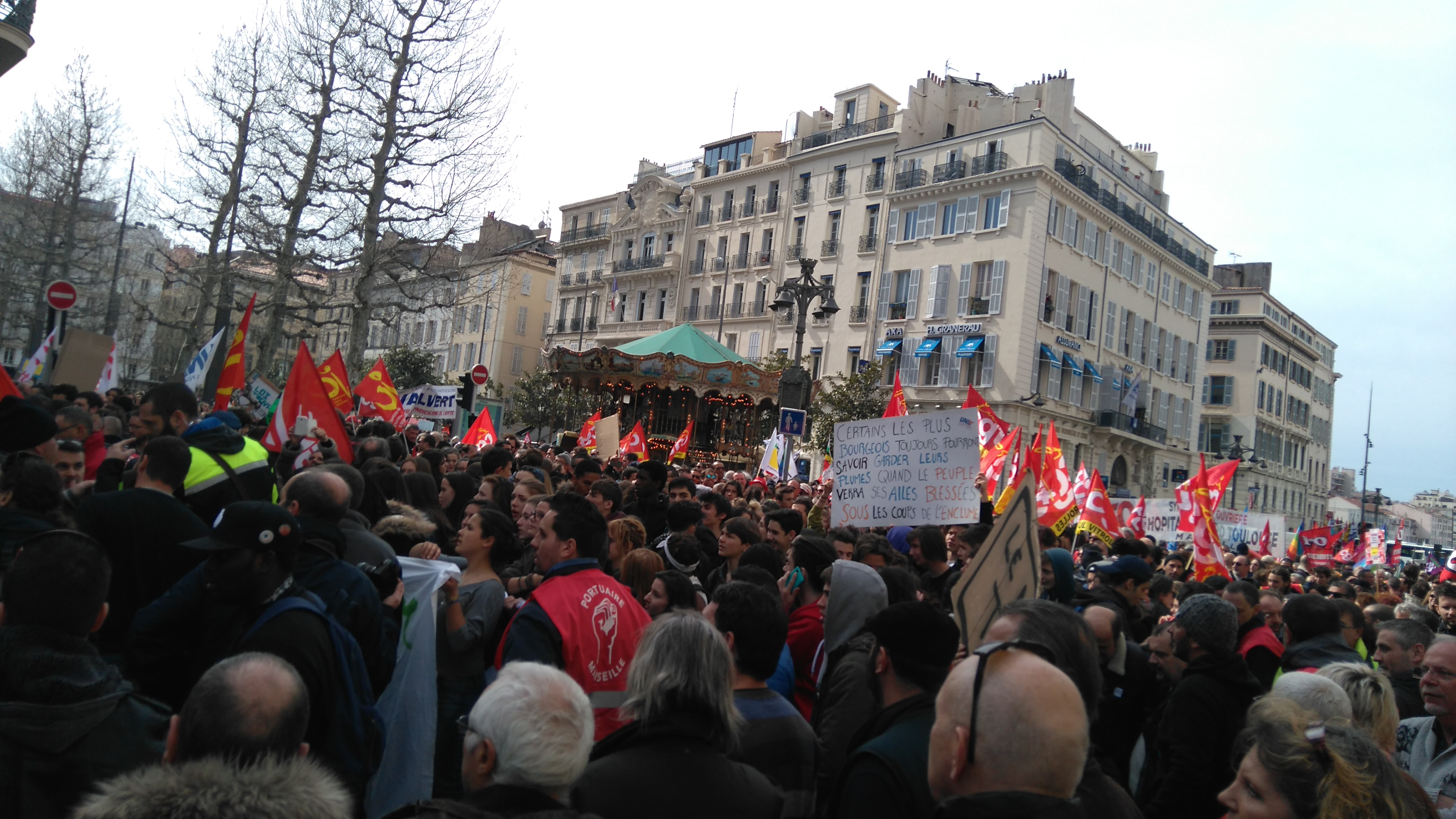
Protests against the El Khomri law in Marseille on 9 March

The law no. 2016-1088 of August 8, 2016 relating to work, the modernisation of social dialogue and the securing of professional careers is a piece of national legislation in France relating to employment. It is commonly known as the El Khomri law or the Loi travail. It evoked wide protests by labour unions around the country. The law came into force by a gazette notification on 9 August 2016.

The text, after being reworked by the government, was adopted without a vote on first reading by the National Assembly, following the government's assumption of responsibility, thanks to the use of article 49 paragraph 3 of the French Constitution (known as "49.3"). Following its adoption by the Senate, the text was again adopted without a vote by the National Assembly on a new and final reading. It was promulgated on 8 August 2016.

Labour law reform continued in 2017 with a new reform of the Labour Code.

== Background ==
In 2007, the TEPA law exempted overtime from tax. This provision was repealed in 2012, judged by the government to be responsible for the destruction of between 40,000 and 80,000 jobs.

The Law was first presented in parliament on 17 February 2016 by labour minister Myriam El Khomri under the Second Valls Government; it was adopted into law on 8 August 2016. The legislation was designed to revise France's Labour Code in a way the government claimed would reduce unemployment.

Emmanuel Macron is a supporter of the law.

== Contents ==
The law makes it easier for companies to lay off workers, reduce overtime payments, and reduce severance payments that workers are entitled to if their company has made them redundant. On the other hand, it allows workers to transfer untaken days off between employers, and provides additional support for young people without training or qualifications.

=== Overtime payments ===
The law maintains that each hour worked in addition to France's statutory 35-hour workweek will be paid overtime. This is generally a 25% increase for the first eight hours of overtime and a 50% increase for subsequent hours worked; however, a company may negotiate an internal agreement with unions that limits the overtime increase to 10%, even if the industry standard is a higher bonus.

Company-level agreements can also prescribe a legal duration of work of 44 weekly hours, and 46 weekly hours within a period of twelve weeks. Such a raise was previously possible only through industry-wide agreement. The law also makes it possible to raise the weekly upper limit to 60 hours in "exceptional circumstances", and also allows the daily legal limit of 10 hours to be increased up to 12 hours when agreed at the company level.

=== Economic redundancies ===
Previous to changes, a company could not proceed with economic redundancies unless it had undergone either a cessation of activity or technological changes. The new law makes redundancies easier to implement and less controversial, requiring only that the company is undergoing "economic difficulties", which it describes as four consecutive trimesters of reduced turnover, or two consecutive trimesters of operating loss. In order to prevent large organisations from benefitting from loopholes, subsidiaries cannot be considered in difficulty if their parent company is not experiencing the same losses.

=== Unfair dismissal payments ===
The El Khomri law indicates a maximum indemnity payment that an employee can receive if labour courts judge that they have experienced unfair dismissal. It aims to reduce the unpredictability of these amounts as judged on a case-by-case basis – although the amount is only an indication and judges are not obliged to follow it. This is intended to speed up judgements and reduce uncertainty for employers.

=== Corporate agreements ===
The law increases the role of company-level agreements by referendum, valid if at least 50% of votes are cast by union members.

=== Employment development agreements ===
A company may conclude an agreement to change work hours and remuneration of employees in order to move into other markets. This agreement can last up to two years. Unions must give their agreement, but if an employee refuses the modifications to their contract they will be made redundant.

=== Personal account of activity ===
The compte personnel d'activité (CPA), open to all employees or jobseekers over 16 years of age, enables workers to carry over untaken sick days or paid holidays between jobs. This is one of the few changes in the law that is beneficial for employees, but represents an additional administrative task for employers.

=== Youth guarantee ===
The garantie jeunes (youth guarantee) is a measure that offers professional monitoring, training, internships or jobs to young people (aged 18–25) without qualifications or professional experience. Beneficiaries would also receive €461 per month in financial aid.

=== New provision: right to disconnect ===
The law also introduces for the first time in French labour law an employee right to disconnect, aimed at regulating the use of digital tools during rest periods, as recommended by the report on the impact of digital technology at work.

== Passage ==
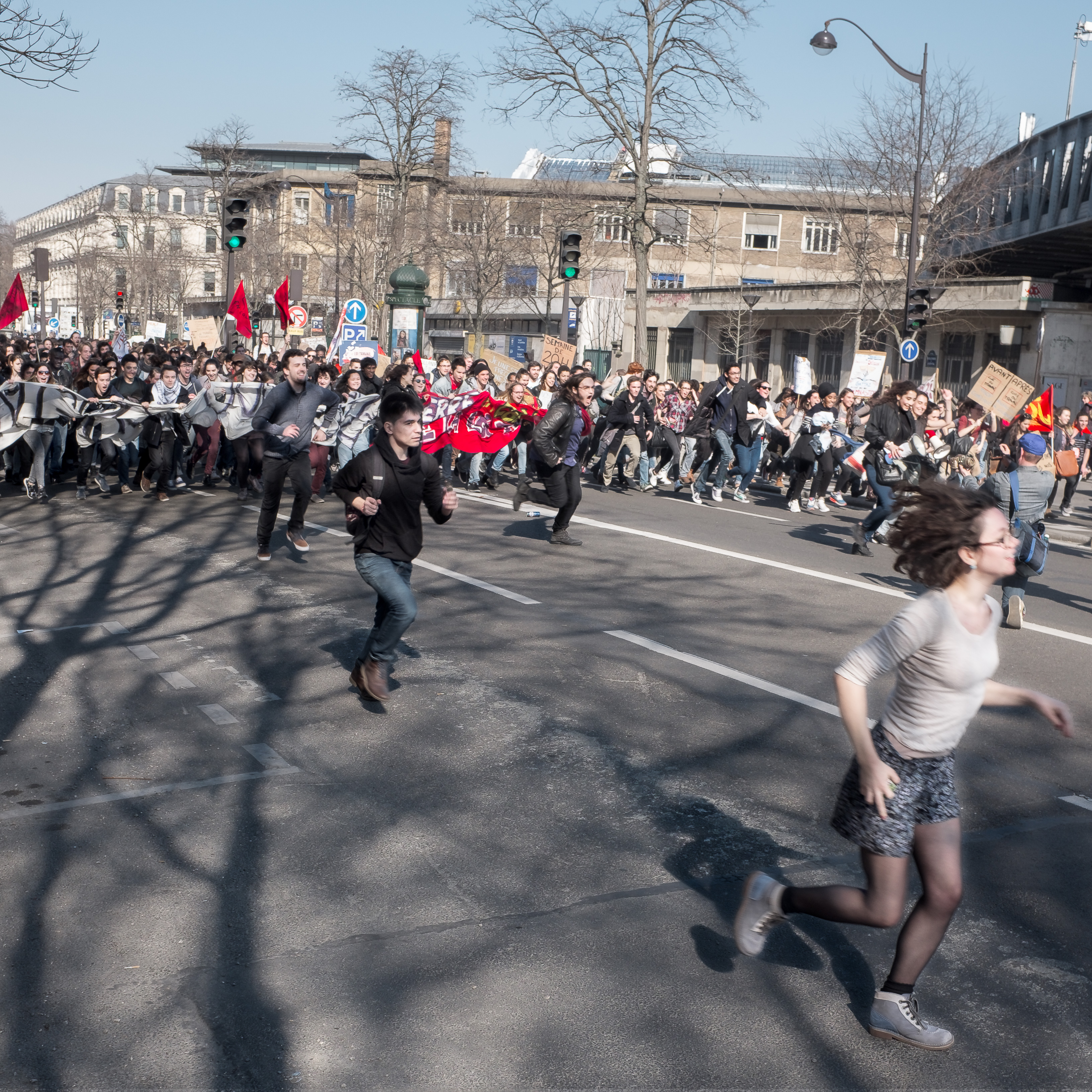
Protests against the El Khomri law in Paris on 17 March.

After the legislation was first proposed in parliament, and while it was still in its draft stage, it was met with significant public opposition and became a catalyst for strikes and demonstrations organised by trade unions and student groups. A broader protest movement known as Nuit debout arose within the context of opposition to the legislation; the movement stated its aims as "overthrowing the El Khomri bill and the world it represents".

On 10 May, Prime Minister Manuel Valls announced that the government would force the legislation through France's lower house, the National Assembly, without a vote, using Article 49.3 of the French Constitution. As a result, the law was passed directly to the Senate, France's upper house, for debate. Following two further invocations of article 49.3, the law was definitively passed in the lower house on 21 July, and was approved by the Constitutional Council on 4 August before being adopted into law on 8 August.

== See also ==
- French labour law
- European labour law
- EU law
- UK labour law
- German labour law
- US labor law
