= Paul Taylor (comedian) =

English stand-up comedian (born 1986)

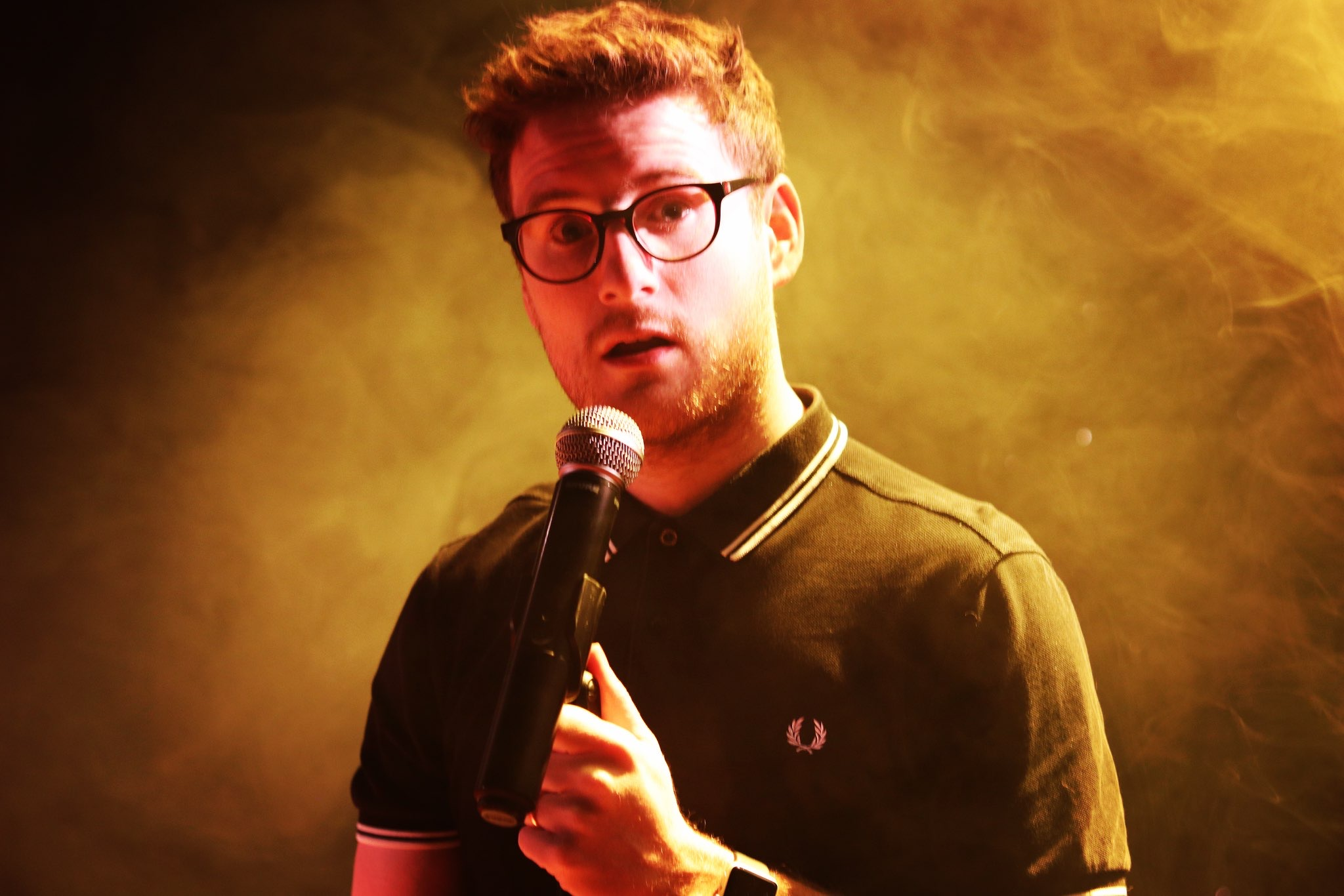
- Born: 11 October 1986 (age 40); Chelmsford, England
- Children: 1
- Relatives: Kyle Taylor (half-brother)

Comedy career
- Medium: Stand up, television
- Website: paultaylorcomedy.com

Paul Taylor (born 11 October 1986) is an English comedian. He moved to Paris in 2009 and started doing stand-up comedy in 2013. Taylor is known in France for his TV series on Canal+, What the Fuck France, What's Up France? and Stereotrip, but he got his onstage debut with his show #Franglais (2016–2019). He played his second show, So British (ou presque), from 2019 to June 2022 and his third show, Bisoubye x, from January 2023 to January 2024.

== Biography ==
Taylor was born in Chelmsford, England. His father is English and his mother is Irish, but Paul grew up in Switzerland (from 2 to 4 years old) and in France, until he was 9 years old. Because of his upbringing, he speaks French with no discernible foreign accent. Taylor then moved back to England after his parents separated.

Taylor studied languages at university in London – he is fluent English, French and Spanish. After his studies, he got a job at Apple. Three years after being hired, he became a trainer for Apple employees abroad. He moved to Paris when he was 23, and then decided to "get up on stage and make people laugh." As he recalled in his show #Franglais, he quit Apple without any unemployment benefits, unusual for France.

== Media debut ==
While at university, Taylor was an extra in The Oxford Murders. What made him known to a larger audience was the online video La Bise (referring to the cheek kisses used as a greeting in France). The video, which was made to promote a night of English language humour in Paris, was uploaded on 1 January 2016, and has now more than 3 million views. Filmed in a sequence shot, La Bise mocked this French tradition, and served as a model for Taylor's show What the Fuck France? episodes.

== Television ==
Thanks to the success of La Bise, watched over a million times in a few days on YouTube, Canal+ contacted Paul Taylor the week following its release, offering him to develop a regular short program along the same format. What the Fuck France? was then broadcast on Canal+. The three-minute short comedy show debuted in September 2016, and ran for 34 episodes in which Taylor humorously dissects the peculiarities of French life, as seen through an expat's eyes. What the Fuck France? was one of the first shows broadcast in English on a French network.

A second program, also broadcast on Canal+, was released in 2017 in a similar format: What's Up France? This time, Taylor dissected and analyzed the French news in 14 episodes.

Finally, a third show was created in 2018 with Canal+. Stereotrip (a contraction of stereotype and roadtrip) reviews the clichés and stereotypes associated with Italy, Switzerland, Spain, Sweden, Germany, and England in six 45-minute episodes.

== Stand-up shows ==
Taylor defines himself primarily as a stand-up comedian. After a few attempts in England at amateur stand-up, he made his debut in Paris in 2013. He became successful quite quickly, particularly thanks to his online videos and his projects with Canal+.

=== #Franglais ===
His first stand-up show, #Franglais, 50% in French, 50% en anglais, was performed in different Parisian theatres such as Le Sentier des Halles, La Nouvelle Ève, and L'Européen, and then on tour in France, Europe and Canada, for almost three years. The entire show was filmed at La Nouvelle Ève in March 2018, and broadcast on Canal+. The final three shows took place at the Casino de Paris in front of 1,400 spectators.

In #Franglais, Paul Taylor talked about his woes with the French language, which he has not mastered yet, even after many years of studying and despite his flawless accent.

=== So British (ou presque) ===
On 18 October 2019, Taylor debuted his second show, So British (ou presque), after a break-in period of a few weeks in August 2018 at the Point Virgule. The new show was almost called Rebecoming British, but the title was rejected as the verb to rebecome was a neologism coined by Taylor.

On 22 June 2020 he participated in a special show at L'Européen, Retour vers la Culture, to celebrate the end of the Coronavirus lockdown and a return to normal life in France. A dozen artists performed that night, such as Bun Hay Mean and Fills Monkey.

=== Bisoubye x ===
Paul Taylor's work in progress for his first show started on 3 November 2022 at la Scala, in Paris. It started on 4 January 2023 at La Cigale in Paris and concluded at Zénith Paris on 6 January 2024.

Bisoubye x unveils the people and things Paul Taylor has had to say goodbye to in order to make way for a new chapter in his life.

== Inspiration ==
Comedians Lee Evans, Ricky Gervais and Louis C.K are credited as influences of Taylor.

== Personal life ==
Taylor married his wife Adeline on 3 June 2017. Their daughter, Louise, was born in France on 28 June 2019.

Taylor has a half-brother, Kyle Taylor, who plays professional football as a midfielder. He is currently a free agent.

Taylor is left-handed, and plays the guitar.
