= Unemployment benefits in France =

Unemployment insurance in France was first established in 1958. Benefits and contributions are set by the independent body called UNEDIC which is controlled equally by trade unions and employer associations. Unemployment benefits are paid only to those persons who fulfill certain requirements.

== History ==
Unemployment insurance was established by Charles de Gaulle on 31 December 1958 and initially applied only to employees of the commerce sector. From the start, the employers organization CNPF and the trade unions FO, CFTC and CGC signed up to the new system. The system was not initially part of the French Social Security system and caused one main union the CGT to not sign the accord. The system did not include any structure to help those unemployed to find work. Thus in 1967, the ANPE was created.

In the 1980s the rapid rise of unemployment brought UNEDIC to the brink of collapse as the employer organisations refused to endorse an increase in contributions to balance the accounts of Unedic. Finally, employer organisations and unions agreed to reduce benefits and make them dependent on the length of contributions.

Since 1984, the state has taken over from UNEDIC once a worker has used up their benefits. Beneficiaries receive the RMI (Minimum subsistence revenue).

In 1992 the system again fell into deficit and the partners decided to increase the required contribution period together with reductions for the long-term unemployed. In 2001 the reductions were abandoned in favour of incentives to employ the long-term unemployed (PARE) but the reduced contributions and rising unemployment brought the system into deficit again and the partners were again forced to revise the system reducing the length of benefits from 30 months to 23. The reduction leaves only half of the unemployed getting benefits from UNEDIC.

In 2005 Employment and Cohesion minister Jean-Louis Borloo introduced the social cohesion law which formally abolished the Agence nationale pour l'emploi (National employment agency) monopoly on employment placement. The act created 300 Maison de l'emploi (employment houses) housing all agencies responsible for helping the unemployed. In 2006 an accord again tightened requirements for claimants at the same time as introducing the single office principle and the monthly counselling of claimants. As of December 2008 the ANPE and Assedic were merging into the newly created Pôle emploi.

== Management of unemployment insurance ==
The partners (unions and employee organisations) meet every three years and agree on a new accord that primarily sets out the contributions assigned to the unemployment insurance scheme and the benefits to be paid to claimants for the next three years. Once the partners agree the government must pass an act of parliament to give it the force of law.

Although managed independently from the state, the scheme's revenues and costs are considered to be part of public revenue and expenditure and hence any borrowing required to finance the system is guaranteed by the state.

== The UNEDIC accords ==
The first twenty years after its creation the scheme had no financial difficulties. During the 1970s increased unemployment pushed the scheme into deficit. In 2000 with the scheme showing a healthy surplus of 1.3 billion euros, the partners signed an accord which forecasts an 18 billion euro surplus over the following three years and consequently agree on a reduction in contributions to bring the scheme into equilibrium. A court decision in 2004 reinstated some benefits and called into question the financial plan of the scheme. In 2007 the Court of Appeal (Cour de Cassation) struck down the lower court's decision. The current accord was signed in February 2009 and sets out the following conditions for receiving unemployment benefits.

== Requirements to receive unemployment benefits ==
Under the 2009 accord, the following requirements must be met,

- Claimants must be actively seeking work or be in an approved training programme.
- Claimants must not be of retirement age
- Claimants must be physically apt for work
- Claimants must not have resigned voluntarily from his last job unless he can prove that after resigning he has effectively contributed for 91 days or has worked at least 455 hours.
- Claimants must reside within Metropolitan France, Overseas departments or Saint-Barthelemy, Saint Martin or Saint Pierre and Miquelon.
- Claimants must have contributed 122 days or 610 hours in the last 28 to 36 months (depending on the claimant's age).

== Benefits duration ==
Benefits are payable for the same duration as the contributions but may not exceed 730 days. The minimum period is 122 days. Claimants over 50 may receive benefits for up to 1095 days.

== Finances ==
Beneficiaries of unemployment benefit

- 1958: 24,000
- 1968 100,000
- 1974: 200,000
- 1976: 1,000,000
- 1980: 2,000,000
- 2011: 2,439,000

Financial results (millions d'euros)
Year	Income	Expenses	Annual surplus/(deficit)	Debt position
1985	7.614	7.829	0.214	xxx
1986	8.753	8.350	+ 0.403	xxx
1987	9.195	9.248	0.054	xxx
1988	10.295	10.059	+ 0.237	xxx
1989	11.601	10.858	+ 0.743	xxx
1990	12.703	12.153	+ 0.550	xxx
1991	13.108	14.340	1.231	xxx
1992	14.764	16.984	2.310	xxx
1993	17.829	19.169	1.341	xxx
1994	20.268	18.942	+ 1.326	xxx
1995	20.936	17.521	+ 3.415	xxx
1996	20.462	18.892	+ 1.570	xxx
1997	19.629	19.957	0.328	xxx
1998	20.549	20.867	0.318	xxx
1999	21.332	21.748	0.416	xxx
2000	22.776	21.444	+ 1.332	+2.965
2001	22.723	22.476	+ 0.247	+2.144
2002	22.559	26.279	3.720	-1.554
2003	25.784	30.067	4.282	-5.836
2004	26.732	31.152	4.420	-10.260
2005	27.695	30.887	3.192	-13.452
2006	29.394	29.050	+ 0.344	-13.108
2008	30.5	25.9	+ 4.59	-4.99
2010	30.8	34.0	3.25	-8.9
2011	32.7	33.9	1.25	-11
2012	33.2	35.8	2.57	-13.9

== See also ==
- Unemployment benefits
- Social security in France
