= List of French institutions =

== Executive power ==
- President of the French Republic
- Government of France
- Ministers of France

== Legislative power ==
- French Congress of Parliament
- French National Assembly
- French Senate

== Judicial power ==
- Constitutional Council of France
- Council of magistrature

== See also ==
- List of German institutions
- Portal:France
- Portal:Politics
- Politics of France
