= Labor Code (France) =

Compilation of texts applicable to labor law

French Labour Code

French Parliament
- Long title: Legal code governing labour relations and employment contracts in France
- Territorial extent: France
- Enacted by: French Parliament
- Enacted: 1910

In French law, the French Labor Code (in French: Code du travail) is a comprehensive compilation of most legislative and regulatory texts applicable to labor law, primarily governing employees under private sector employment contracts. Public sector employees are generally subject to specific statutes, (Note: However, case law has extended certain provisions of the Labour Code to public sector employees, such as the Toulouse city ruling on the minimum wage, CE, 23 April 1982, No. 36851.) though some provisions may apply. Beyond the Labor Code, other normative texts influence French labor law, including:

- International texts, such as the International Covenant on Economic, Social and Cultural Rights (1966) and conventions of the ILO.
- European texts, including EU regulations, directives, treaties, and the European Convention on Human Rights.
- Uncoded decrees or orders.
- Collective agreements and conventions, which play an increasingly significant normative role due to evolving social dialogue. (Note: For further details on labour law sources, see French labour law.)

== History ==
=== From 1896 to 1910 ===
The idea of a specific Labor Code emerged in the late 19th century amid rapid industrialization and socio-economic transformations. The growth of factories and urbanization led to challenging working conditions, including long hours, low wages, and rising safety concerns. These issues highlighted the need for coherent and protective labor regulations, prompting debates among jurists and economists about whether to reform the Civil Code or create a dedicated labor code.

Early milestones included the Waldeck-Rousseau Act of 1884, which recognized trade union freedom. The rise of the labor movement, increasing demands, and the need for regulation in response to industrialization laid the groundwork for progressive reforms, such as the abolition of workers' record books by a law of 2 July 1890.

==== Arthur Groussier's proposal: Codifying labor laws ====
On 14 March 1896, socialist deputy Arthur Groussier proposed a resolution to codify labor laws, supported by his party, at the Chamber of Deputies. The resolution aimed to task the Chamber's Labor Committee with compiling and revising all laws protecting workers' interests into a comprehensive Labor Code. Groussier argued for a specific code, stating, "We have a commercial code regulating merchants' relations, a rural code for farmers, and we demand a labor code to regulate workers' and employers' relations." Although this proposal did not progress, Groussier reintroduced it in the next legislative session. On 13 June 1898, he proposed a bill with 866 articles regulating service contracts, obligations, compensation for abrupt terminations, wage payment terms, and limiting daily work to eight hours. It also included measures for worker hygiene and safety. The bill defined workers in its first article as "persons of all ages and sexes who hire out their labor or services to individuals, companies, municipalities, departments, or the State, under any title, in industrial, commercial, or agricultural operations, or public or private establishments."

Groussier's bill proposed establishing labor chambers to compile statistics, oversee labor inspections, and address employer-worker relations. It also suggested creating labor tribunals with jurisdiction over disputes from workplace accidents or hygiene and safety violations. This comprehensive proposal reflected socialist ideas on labor legislation, shared by figures like Jules Guesde. Subsequent proposals followed, gaining traction in 1906 under Minister Viviani, who planned a four-book codification of labor laws.

==== Codification commission and the 1905 vote ====
Alexandre Millerand, Minister of Commerce and Industry from June 1899 to June 1902 under Pierre Waldeck-Rousseau, pursued the goal of organizing scattered labor laws. He focused on regulating individual labor relations. On 27 November 1901, he established an extra parliamentary commission for the "codification of labor laws," aiming to create a coherent code beyond mere compilation. The commission, chaired by a former Keeper of the Seals, included jurists like Raoul Jay and Georges Bourgin, professors at the Paris Faculty of Law, Arthur Fontaine, a future labor director, socialist deputy Arthur Groussier, and two Court of Cassation counsellors. The commission produced six books, titled The Labor and Social Welfare Code, covering labor conventions, work regulations, professional associations, jurisdictions, conciliation, arbitration, professional representation, workers' insurance, and welfare.

In 1905, the Rouvier government adopted the commission's compilation, presenting a bill passed without debate by the Chamber on 15 April 1905 after an urgency declaration. However, the Senate, on 22 February 1906, noted unauthorized changes by the commission and postponed discussions indefinitely. The texts remained dormant until 1910, when Labor Minister René Viviani resumed work. Books IV and V were also presented to the Senate in 1906 but saw no discussion.

Amid a general strike called by the CGT on 1 May 1906, with over 1,300 strikes averaging 19 days, President Georges Clemenceau established the Ministry of Labor and Social Welfare on 25 October 1906, led by Viviani. This ministry supported parliamentary efforts, driven by socialists (Jules Guesde, Jean Jaurès) and social Catholics, leading to laws like the 13 July 1907 act allowing women to control their wages and the 5 April 1910 act establishing workers' and peasants' pensions.

=== Code of 1910–1927 ===
The first book of the Labor Code, titled Labor and Social Welfare Code, was adopted on 28 December 1910, covering labor conventions (apprenticeship, employment contracts, wages, and placement). Its preparation was delayed, compiling existing laws like the 1884 union law, the 1892 law limiting women's and children's work to 11 hours daily, and the Workplace accident compensation law. The code was completed on 25 February 1927 with Book III on professional associations, omitting the social welfare section.

Collective agreements, recognized by a 25 March 1919 law asserting their supremacy over individual employment contracts, supplemented the Labor Code for each industry and profession.In overseas territories, the Labor Code was not applied before 15 December 1952.

=== Code of 1973 ===
A new code was enacted by Law No. 73-4 of 2 January 1973, comprising a legislative part and two regulatory parts for Council of State decrees and simple decrees.

==== Structure ====
The 1973 code was divided into eight, later nine, books:

- Book I: Labor conventions
- Book II: Work regulations
- Book III: Placement and employment
- Book IV: Professional associations, employee representation, profit-sharing, participation, and employee savings plans
- Book V: Labor disputes
- Book VI: Monitoring the application of labor legislation and regulations
- Book VII: Provisions for specific professions
- Book VIII: Special provisions for overseas territories
- Book IX: Continuous vocational training within lifelong learning (Note: This book was added later.)

==== Auroux laws ====
The Auroux laws, enacted in 1982 under the second Mauroy government during François Mitterrand's first presidency, amended nearly a third of the 1973 Labor Code, affecting over 300 articles.

=== Code of 2007–2008 ===
==== Simplification proposals of 2004 ====
The Labor Code evolves continuously, with provisions created, amended, or repealed, sometimes causing inconsistencies, particularly in cross-references. Governments since 2002 have criticized its complexity and proposed simplifications. In 2004, the Virville Report suggested reforms. Law No. 2004-1343 of 9 December 2004 on "simplification of the law" authorized the government to enact a new Labor Code via ordinances within 18 months, aiming to harmonize legislation and integrate uncoded laws. When this deadline was missed, Law No. 2006-1770 extended the timeline by nine months.

==== Adoption and union criticism ====
The legislative part of the new Labor Code was published via Ordinance No. 2007-329 of 12 March 2007, set to take effect on 1 March 2008. Criticisms included:

- The code's structure, such as reclassifying apprenticeship under vocational training instead of employment contracts.
- Recodifying provisions into other codes, like the Social Action and Families Code or Mining Code, seemingly removing them from the Labor Code.
- Downgrading some provisions to the regulatory section, allowing government modification under Articles 34 and 37.
- Wording changes, like replacing "The employer must inform" with "The employer informs," reducing perceived obligation.

Opponents filed an annulment action before the Council of State, but Law No. 2008-67 of 21 January 2008 ratified the ordinance, setting a new effective date of 1 May 2008. Some old code provisions remained in force, creating clarity issues. (Note: Example: Non-application of working time rules to transport sector employees.) The regulatory part was integrated by Decrees No. 2008-243 and 2008-244 of 7 March 2008.

==== Four-digit numbering structure ====
The new code adopted a four-digit numbering system and a structure with a preliminary chapter and eight parts:

- Preliminary chapter: Social dialogue
- Part 1: Individual labor relations
- Part 2: Collective labor relations
- Part 3: Working time, wages, profit-sharing, participation, and employee savings
- Part 4: Health and safety at work
- Part 5: Employment
- Part 6: Lifelong vocational training
- Part 7: Provisions for specific professions and activities
- Part 8: Monitoring the application of labor legislation

=== Reforms of 2015–2016 under the Valls government ===
Bernard Vivier, director of the Higher Labor Institute, noted in 2015 that "the Labor Code grows without this increase in pages being justified by new, clear necessities. The issue is not the code's thickness but its uncertain, hard-to-apply, and unclear nature."

==== Contributions of the 6 August 2015 Macron Law ====
The Law for Growth, Activity, and Equal Economic Opportunities, known as the "Macron Law," amended the Labor Code regarding Sunday work, labor court procedures, employee savings, employee shareholding, and collective redundancies.

==== 2016 Labor Law ====
The Law on Labor, Modernisation of Social Dialogue, and Securing Career Paths, or "El Khomri Law," was enacted on 8 August 2016, initiated by Labor Minister Myriam El Khomri. Unveiled on 17 February 2016, it aimed to "protect employees, promote hiring, and grant more flexibility for enterprise-level negotiations."

The right to disconnect, allowing employees to avoid professional digital tools (e.g., phones, emails) outside working hours, was introduced for companies with over 50 employees.

=== 2017 Reform under the Philippe government ===
The Labor Code was amended by five ordinances on 22 September 2017, supplemented by decrees in 2017 and 2018, continuing the 2016 reforms. The government presented these as "practical and operational measures for employment, businesses, and employees." The reform included 117 measures, such as increased and capped severance payments and expanded use of permanent project-based contracts. Key innovations included:

- Merging employee representative bodies into a single Social and Economic Committee.
- Enhancing enterprise-level collective bargaining, allowing agreements without union delegates.
- Introducing collective agreed terminations.

== Scope and content ==
The Labor Code governs:

- Individual labor relations (employment contracts).
- Collective labor relations (collective bargaining, union activities, employee representation).
- Employee health and safety.
- Employment and vocational training.

=== Labor Law and Civil Law ===
The Labor Code specifies that employment contracts are subject to civil law. Article L. 1221-1 states: "The employment contract is subject to the rules of common law [...]." This refers to the Civil Code's general contract rules, particularly Articles 1108, (Note: "Four conditions are essential for a contract's validity: the consent of the obligated party, their capacity to contract, a certain object forming the engagement's substance, and a lawful cause.") 1109, (Note: "There is no valid consent if given by mistake, extorted by violence, or obtained by fraud.") 1116, (Note: "Fraud is a ground for contract nullity when one party's manoeuvres are such that, without them, the other party would not have contracted. It is not presumed and must be proven.") 1123–1133 on contract validity, and 1184. (Note: "The resolutory condition is always implied in bilateral contracts if one party fails to fulfil their obligation. In such cases, the contract is not automatically terminated. The party whose obligation was not fulfilled may choose to enforce the contract if possible or seek termination with damages. Termination must be sought judicially, and the defendant may be granted a delay based on circumstances." Note: In labor law, "judicial termination" is used, reflecting the employment contract as a successive performance contract, unlike "resolution" for other contracts.)

=== Role of collective bargaining ===
The Labor Code regulates collective bargaining under Articles L. 2121-1 and following, covering conventions and collective agreements.

=== Scope of application ===
The Labor Code applies to private sector employees and, unless otherwise specified, to public industrial and commercial establishments. Some administrative public services may hire under private law contracts, partially subject to the Labor Code. Certain provisions, such as those on union representativeness, right to strike, and health and safety committees, apply to the public service, particularly in hospitals.

== Enforcement of the Labor Code ==
=== Labor inspection ===
The Labor Code (Articles L. 8112-1 and following) tasks the labor inspection with enforcing its provisions, uncoded labor laws, and collective agreements. Inspections are conducted by state officials, including labor inspectors and controllers.

=== Jurisdictional competencies ===
The Labor Code assigns civil courts jurisdiction based on dispute type. Individual employment contract disputes fall under the labor court. Collective disputes are handled by the judicial court. Until 2019, high courts addressed collective agreement validity disputes, while district courts handled professional election disputes.

== See also ==
- French labour law
- Trade unions in France
- Right to disconnect
- French Civil Code
- Dismissal

== Bibliography ==
- Cohen, Maurice; Milet, Laurent (2017). Le droit des comités d'entreprise et des comités de groupe [The Law of Works Councils and Group Committees] (in French) (13 ed.). Issy-les-Moulineaux: Librairie générale de droit et de jurisprudence. p. 1520. ISBN 978-2-275-04595-5.
- Radé, Christophe; Dechristé, Caroline; Gadrat, Magali (2018). Code du travail [Labour Code] (in French) (81 ed.). Paris: Dalloz. p. 3124. ISBN 978-2-247-17717-2.
- Béraud, Jean-Marc; Guillaumin, Stéphane; Ribert, Nathalie; Vasseur, Florence (2018). Le Code du Travail Annoté [Annotated Labour Code] (in French) (38 ed.). Paris: Groupe Revue Fiduciaire. p. 2912. ISBN 978-2-7579-0597-5.
- Teyssié, Bernard (2018). Code du travail [Labour Code] (in French) (34 ed.). Paris: LexisNexis. p. 3820. ISBN 978-2-7110-2887-0.
