= List of German institutions =

List of links to the governmental institutions of Germany

== Executive power ==
- The President
- The Chancellor
- The Cabinet

== Legislative power ==
- Bundesversammlung The Federal Assembly
- Bundestag The Federal Diet
- Bundesrat The Federal Council

== Judicial power ==
- Federal Constitutional Court Bundesverfassungsgericht
- Federal Labor Court Bundesarbeitsgericht

== See also ==
- List of French institutions
- Portal:Germany
- Portal:Politics
- Politics of Germany
