= UNEDIC =

UNEDIC is the acronym of "Union nationale interprofessionnelle pour l’emploi dans l’industrie et le commerce" (National Professional Union for Employment in Industry and Trade). It was created in 1958. Until 2009, it was an agency of the French government which provided unemployed people with social benefits. In 2009, it was merged with the ANPE into the newly created agency Pôle emploi, and was turned into an independent association.

== Official name ==
The official acronym was UNEDIC, but it was commonly written Unedic. However, the acronym was sometimes written UNÉDIC or Unédic. From 2009, the official name is Unédic. While there is no accent on the word "emploi", there is an accent in "Unédic" because of the apostrophe just before the word in the complete name, in French.

Until 2009, Unedic was closely associated with the ASSEDIC (or Assedic). Both agencies were often referred to as "Unedic-Assedic" or "Assedic-Unedic" (with multiple variations on accents and capital letters).

== Former missions ==
The Unedic was an agency under governmental control. It was managed by the "social partners", which are both representatives of trade-unions and representatives of companies leaders. There are six trade-unions officially recognized by the government, which are CGT, CFDT, FO, CFE-CGC and CFTC, and three patronal organizations, Medef, CGPME et UPA. Representatives of both groups have equal power to manage the agency, as is the case for many other governmental agencies.

The agency used set the amount of unemployment contributions (paid by a part of salaries). It was affiliated to the Assedic agencies, which collected and paid the contributions. In 2008, it employed almost 15,000 people.

== Current mission ==
On 1 January 2009, the agency turned into an association led by social partners. The government is not implicated, the agency is totally independent. However, it continues to set the amounts of social contributions and employment benefits.
