= Mr T v. Cubik Partners =

2022 French court case

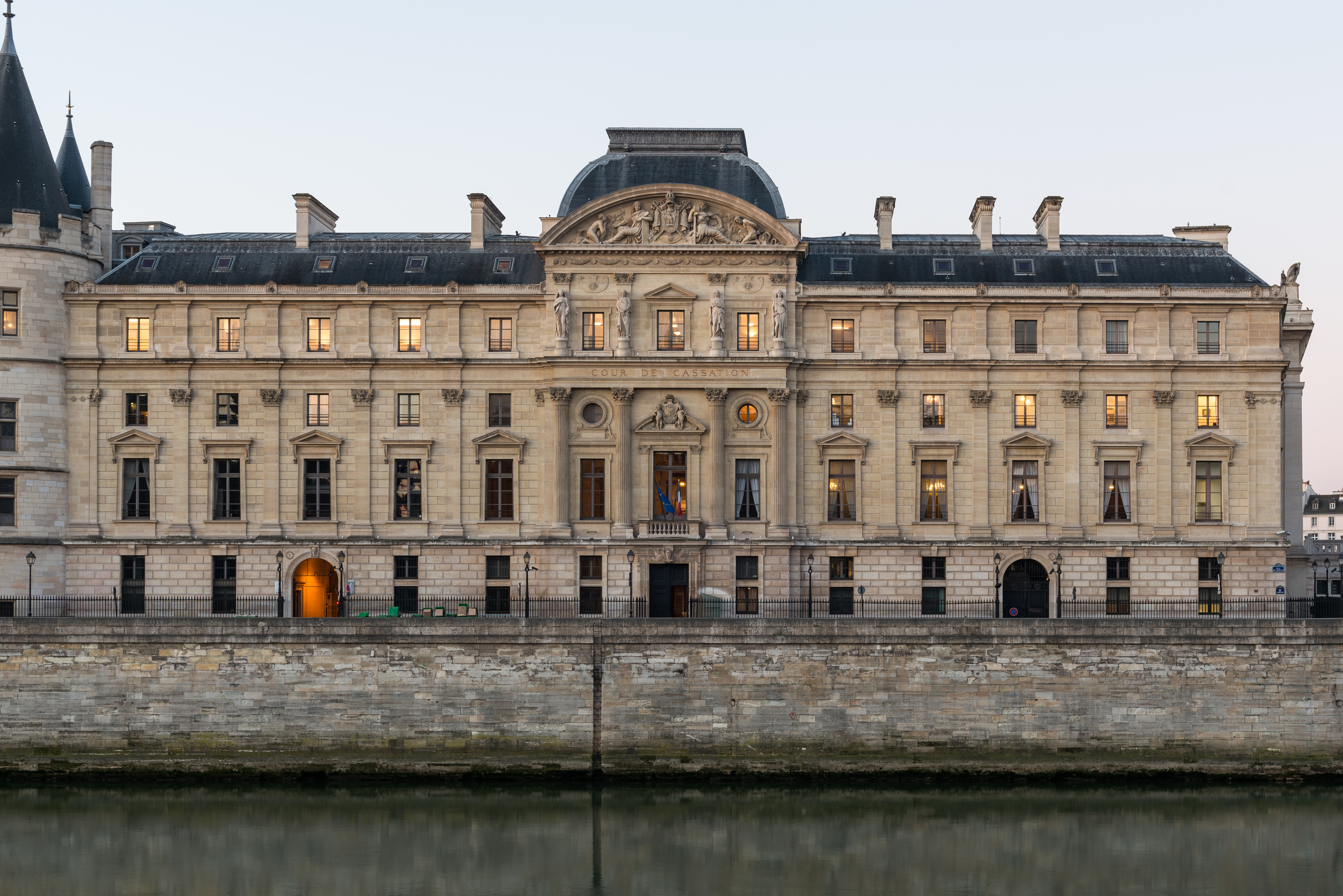
- Court: Court of Cassation (France)
- Decided: November 9, 2022
- Citation: 21-15.208

Court membership
- Judge sitting: Mme Mariette (President)

Mr T v. Cubik Partners was the November 9, 2022 French Court of Cassation decision number Q 21-15.208 that found that Mr T's right to freedom of expression was infringed when he was terminated for refusing to take part in work mandated social activities.

The court's decision, in Mr T's favour, was informed by the French Labour Code and the European Convention on Human Rights.

== Background ==
The court case was an appeal of a March 10, 2021 Paris Court of Appeal decision that found in Cubik Partners favour. Mr T is the court's anonymised name for a man who worked as a senior advisor for Cubik Partners. Mr T joined the company in 2011, and was promoted in 2014.

Cubik Partners is a Paris-based training and management consultancy company that sells training services that incorporate "fun". Mr T's employment was terminated in March 2015 after he refused to take part in Cubik Partners mandated "fun" activities. He had worked at the company since 2011, employed initially as a senior consultant before being promoted to director.

== Arguments ==
Cubik Partners described Mr T as "square and boring, difficult to work with and a poor listener". Mr T stated that he had a different understanding of "fun" and that it was his right to engage in “critical behaviour and to refuse company policy based on incitement to partake in various excesses”. Mr T's lawyers told the court that the events incorporated "excessive alcoholism" and "promiscuity."

== Decision ==
The court decided that workers should not be obliged to “forcibly participate in seminars and end-of-week drinks frequently ending up in excessive alcohol intake, encouraged by associates who made very large quantities of alcohol available” and that it was valid for Mr T to not want to take part in “practices linking promiscuity, bullying and incitement to get involved in various forms of excess and misconduct”.

The court found that Cubik Partner's definition of fun breached Mr T's “fundamental right to dignity and respect of private life” and that his refusal to take part was his “freedom of expression.” The court stated that the culture of the company included “humiliating and intrusive practices regarding privacy such as simulated sexual acts, the obligation to share a bed with a colleague during seminars, the use of nicknames to designate people and hanging up deformed and made-up photos in offices.” The court obliged Cubik Partners to pay Mr T €3,000. Mr T requested a further €461,000 of damages, which the court is expected to rule on in future.

In reaching its decision the court cited Article L. 1121-1 of the Labor Code, and Article 10, § 1, of the European Convention on Human Rights.

== Responses ==
The Washington Post compared the case to a 2022 High Court of Justice (UK) case in which Michael Brockie successfully litigated against, his employers, PwC after sustaining a head injury following a company-organised evening of excessive alcohol consumption. Also in 2022, Lloyd's of London fined member firm Atrium Underwriters £1 million after it including an employees' "boys' night out" during which senior leadership "took part in inappropriate initiation games and heavy drinking, and made sexual comments about female colleagues".

== See also ==
- French labour law
- Jurisdictional organization (France)
- Law in France
- Court of cassation
