= Right to disconnect =

Proposed human right

The right to disconnect is a proposed human right regarding the ability of people to disconnect from work and primarily not to engage in work-related electronic communications such as emails or messages during non-work hours. The modern working environment has been drastically changed by new communication and information technologies. The boundary between work life and home life has shrunk with the introduction of digital tools into employment. While digital tools bring flexibility and freedom to employees they also can create an absence of limits, leading to excessive interference in the private lives of employees. Several countries, primarily in Europe, but also including Australia, have some form of the right to disconnect included in their law, while in some cases it is present in the policy of many large companies.

== France ==
=== Origins ===
The right to disconnect emerged in France in a decision in the Labour Chamber of the French Supreme Court. The decision on 2 October 2001 held that "the employee is under no obligation either to accept working at home or to bring there his files and working tools." In 2004 the Supreme Court affirmed this decision and ruled that "the fact that [the employee] was not reachable on his cell phone outside working hours cannot be considered as misconduct."

=== El Khomri law ===
The government of France passed the El Khomri law to reform working conditions for French people. Article 55 under Chapter II "Adapting the Labour Law to the Digital Age" (Adaptation du droit du travail à l'ère du numérique) included a provision to amend the French Labour Code to include the right to disconnect (le droit de la déconnexion). Article 55(1) amended Article L. 2242-8 of the Labour Code by adding a paragraph (7);

"(7) The procedures for the full exercise by the employee of his right to disconnect and the establishment by the company of mechanisms for regulating the use of digital tools, with a view to ensuring respect for rest periods and leave as well as personal and family life. Failing agreement, the employer shall draw up a charter, after consultation with the works council or, failing that, with the staff delegates. This charter defines these procedures for the exercise of the right to disconnect and furthermore provides for the implementation, for employees and management and management personnel, of training and awareness-raising activities on the reasonable use of digital tools."

"7° Les modalités du plein exercice par le salarié de son droit à la déconnexion et la mise en place par l'entreprise de dispositifs de régulation de l'utilisation des outils numériques, en vue d'assurer le respect des temps de repos et de congé ainsi que de la vie personnelle et familiale. A défaut d'accord, l'employeur élabore une charte, après avis du comité d'entreprise ou, à défaut, des délégués du personnel. Cette charte définit ces modalités de l'exercice du droit à la déconnexion et prévoit en outre la mise en œuvre, à destination des salariés et du personnel d'encadrement et de direction, d'actions de formation et de sensibilisation à un usage raisonnable des outils numériques"

As prescribed in Article 55(2), Article 55(1) entered into force on January 1, 2017.

=== Context ===
The government of France adopted the right into its Labour Code in response to a September 2015 report on the impact of digital technologies on labour which supported a right to "professional disconnection." The report was presented to the French Minister of Labour Myriam El Khomri after the previous minister sought information on the effect of digital transformation on Labour. The report recommended such a measure stating that a correct balance between work and private life is essential to allow digital transformation to have a positive effect on workers' quality of life and that knowing how to disconnect was a skill which needs to be supported by employers. The report identified cognitive and emotional overload which can lead to a sense of fatigue as a psycho-social risk of being constantly connected.

The government viewed it necessary to adopt such a law to adapt to the changing nature of the workplace, recognizing that digital technologies have blurred the line between work and private lives. It viewed the introduction of the right to disconnect necessary for the health of French employees.

The introduction of this law followed a 2016 study that discovered that 37% of workers were using professional digital tools (e.g. work mobile phones) outside of work hours and that 62% of workers wanted more controls and rules to regulate this.

=== Application ===
The right to disconnect is applied to each company in its own way. The El Khomri law introduces but does not define the right, allowing companies to choose the most practical ways to implement the right taking into consideration the nature of the business (e.g. whether it operates with countries in foreign time zones or whether the employees work nights or in the weekend). For companies with more than 50 employees, the right is to be included in their Mandatory Annual Negotiation (MAN) on gender equality and the nature of quality of life at work. This addition is already required by the El Khomri law through considering ways in which the use of digital tools can be regulated and the means to do this. In the absence of this, a "charter of good conduct" is to be negotiated with union representatives detailing the times that employees can disconnect from their digital tools and when they would not be expected to connected to their smartphones or laptops. Companies with less than 50 employees are expected to release a document to their employees outlining the rules for their company.

The right as it exists in the El Khomri law does not extend to those independent workers who are part of online crowdworking regimes.

The law does not provide any guidance on possible ways to manage the use of digital tools or ways to train or raise awareness among workers. Additionally, while the new law imposes an obligation for large companies to negotiate there is no obligation to reach an agreement, therefore if no agreement is reached between company and employees the right cannot be applied and enforced. It is assumed that the obligation that applies to small companies, for employers to draw up a charter, would then apply. Again there is no penalty for companies who do not do this. Furthermore, such a charter has no legal value in France, unless it contains terms providing or sanctions against employees which allow it to be considered as an appendix to the internal rules of a company.

Employers who fail to include the right to disconnect in the MAN are liable to criminal prosecution for obstructing the exercise of union rights, punishable by 1 year in prison and a €3,750 fine.

=== As an example for other countries ===
It is likely that other European Union nations will follow the example of France and enact a similar law themselves. Outside of a formalized right it is likely that employees and unions could negotiate for similar provisions to apply the right to disconnect to their own workplace, resulting in the right becoming commonplace by human resource management best practice, industry practice, or contractual norms.

== India ==
The concept of a Right to Disconnect—which would legally allow employees to abstain from answering work-related calls, emails or messages outside of agreed working hours—has gained traction in India in recent years. In the Rajya Sabha, A. A. Rahim (CPI(M), Kerala) has drawn attention to this issue, stating the need for legislation to protect workers’ mental health and work–life balance.

Meanwhile, the youth organisation Democratic Youth Federation of India (DYFI) has also launched awareness campaigns emphasising the right to disconnect as a fundamental labour right. One tragic case driving public debate was that of Anna Sebastian Perayil, a 26-year-old chartered accountant who died in July 2024; her family alleges that extreme work-related stress and after-hours connectivity contributed to her untimely passing.

== Germany ==
While not having actual laws relating to the right to disconnect, German companies have a history of implementing policies to the same effect.

Volkswagen implemented a policy in 2011 stating that it would stop email servers from sending emails to the mobile phones of employees between 6pm and 7am. Other German companies such as Allianz, Telekom, Bayer and Henkel all have similar policies in place to limit the amount of digital connection employees have after work hours.

In 2013 Germany's employment ministry banned its managers from contacting staff after hours as part of a wider agreement on remote working. It was done in order to protect the mental health of workers.

In 2014, automobile company Daimler introduced a software called "Mail on Holiday" that its employees could use to automatically delete incoming emails while they were on vacation. This was done to allow Daimler's employees the opportunity to get a break and come back to work refreshed.

German employment minister in 2014, Andrea Nahles, sought to introduce "anti-stress legislation" in response to the rising levels of stress and mental health issues in Germany. Such legislation would ban companies from making contact with employees out of work hours. Nahles commissioned the Federal Institute for Occupational Safety and Health to produce a report researching mental health in the work place and the viability of legislation to target it. The report was completed and published in 2017.

== Italy ==
The right to disconnect entered Italian law through Senate Act no 2233-B "Measures to safeguard non-entrepreneurial self-employment and measures to facilitate flexible articulation in times and places of subordinate employment". Article 19(1) of the Act governs the implementation for an Agreement on Aggregate Work and includes some form of the right to disconnect.

"The Agreement on Aggregate Work shall be stipulated in writing for the purpose of administrative and probative regularity and shall govern the performance of the work performed outside the premises of the company, including with regard to the forms of exercise of the executive power the employer and the tools used by the worker. The agreement also identifies the worker's rest periods as well as the technical and organizational measures necessary to ensure that the worker is disconnected from the technological equipment." [emphasis added]

"L'accordo relativo alla modalità di lavoro agile è stipulato per iscritto ai fini della regolarità amministrativa e della prova, e disciplina l'esecuzione della prestazione lavorativa svolta all'esterno dei locali aziendali, anche con riguardo alle forme di esercizio del potere direttivo del datore di lavoro ed agli strumenti utilizzati dal lavoratore. L'accordo individua altresì i tempi di riposo del lavoratore nonché le misure tecniche e organizzative necessarie per assicurare la disconnessione del lavoratore dalle strumentazioni tecnologiche di lavoro."

== Slovakia ==
On February 19, 2021, the National Council of the Slovak Republic passed an amendment to the Slovak Labor Code (Act No. 311/2001 Coll.), which introduces a right to for remote working employees. Effective on March 1, 2021, the amendment defines three categories of work: homeworking ("domácka práca"), remote work ("telepráca"), and working from home occasionally or in exceptional circumstances. Under Section 52(10) of the amended Slovak Labor Code, employees falling under the newly defined categories have the right to abstain from using work equipment during their designated rest periods, including vacations, public holidays and obstacles at work. The provision further states that if an employee exercises their right to disconnect, the employer may not consider this act as a breach of professional duty.

== Slovenia ==
On November 16, 2024, the amended Employment Relationships Act (ZDR-1D) entered into force. It introduces the right to disconnect in article 142.a, which requires that the employers provide workers with a right to be unavailable during the exercise of their right to rest or during justified absences from work (in particular during holidays, weekends, annual leave, sick leave, etc.). It is not merely the right to be physically absent from the workplace during this time but above all the disconnection from digital tools. The measures to be taken by the employer are determined by a collective agreement at the level of the activity. If no such agreement is made, or if the matter is not covered by such an agreement, this should be determined by a collective agreement at a narrower level. If the employer is not bound by a collective agreement, the matter must be regulated in an internal act of the employer, which should be adopted following the normal procedure for such acts. The act must be communicated to the workers in the manner customary for the employer (e.g. on a notice board in the employer's premises, using technology, etc.) so that all workers are aware of it. In addition, it is advisable to specify the right in the contract of employment itself, so that both parties agree to the exact time the worker must be available to the employer. Outside these hours, the worker is not obliged to be available and should not be subject to sanctions or other retaliatory measures.

== Philippines ==
House Bill 4721 was introduced to the Seventeenth Congress of the House of Representatives of the Philippines in January 2017. The long title of the proposed Act is "An act granting employees the right to disconnect from work-related electronic communications after work hours" and seeks to amend the Labour Code of the Philippines (Presidential Decree No.442). Firstly it aims to make time spent engaging with work-related electronic tools outside of work hours come under the definition of 'hours worked' under Article 48, secondly it would insert Articles 48-A and 48-B which read;

"Right to disconnect -- An employee shall not be reprimanded, punished, or otherwise subjected to disciplinary action if he or she disregards a work-related communication sent after work-hours, subject to the terms and conditions of the policy to be established by the employer as required in Article 84-B hereof"

"Policy on after-hours use of technology -- It shall be the duty of every employer to establish the hours when employees are not supposed to send or answer work-related emails, texts, or calls. The employer shall determine the conditions and exemptions therefrom, subject to such rules and regulations as the Secretary of Labor and Employment may provide"

This bill has already begun to take effect. In February 2017 the Department of Labour and Employment in the Philippines stated that employees have a right to disconnect from work after hours by disregarding work-related communications without facing discipline.

The bill has received the support of the General Alliance of Workers Association (GAWA), a labour group in the Philippines. GAWA particularly supports the amendment to Article 48 calling it undeclared labour. GAWA cited the dangers of constant connection as a reason why the bill should pass, referring to the risk of burning out or physical and mental stress caused by an inability to rest. Additionally, they pointed out that employers would see benefits as their employees would be more productive.

== Canada ==
The Province of Ontario passed Bill 27, Working for Workers Act, 2021, which requires some employers to define expectations around disconnecting from work. The law defines disconnecting from work as "not engaging in work-related communications, including emails, telephone calls, video calls or the sending or reviewing of other messages, so as to be free from the performance of work." Only small employers are exempt from this requirement; employers with more than 25 employees on January 1 of a given year must implement a policy by March 1 of the same year. As of its passing, there are no explicit requirements in the law as to what a policy must contain. The law reserves the possibility for the government to require specific information in the future.

== Australia ==
On 12 February 2024, the Parliament of Australia passed the Fair Work Legislation Amendment (Closing Loopholes No. 2) Bill 2023, which included a right to disconnect. The legislative reform aims to address the challenges of work-life balance in the digital era. Under the amendments to the Fair Work Act 2009, employees can ignore work-related communications outside of normal work hours, provided their refusal to engage is not unreasonable. Disputes will be overseen by the Fair Work Commission, which can issue stop orders to protect employers from taking action against an employee.

== Links to existing international human rights ==
The right to disconnect shares similarities with several pre-existing human rights. The most notable of these is the right to rest and leisure found in article 24 of the Universal Declaration of Human Rights. This right explicitly places limitations on the amount of time people can work for, something that the right to disconnect takes further and places into the modern age. The right to disconnect also crosses into the article 23 of the UDHR, that everyone has the right to work and receive fair remuneration and to join trade unions to protect their interests.

The International Labour Organization is also a relevant source of measures and rights supplementary to the right to disconnect. A recent study endorsed by the ILO has affirmed the need for workers to be able to disconnect from technology in order to avoid the blurring of the lines between work life and personal life.

== See also ==
- Labour law
- Right to be forgotten
- Labor Code (France)
