= Assédic =

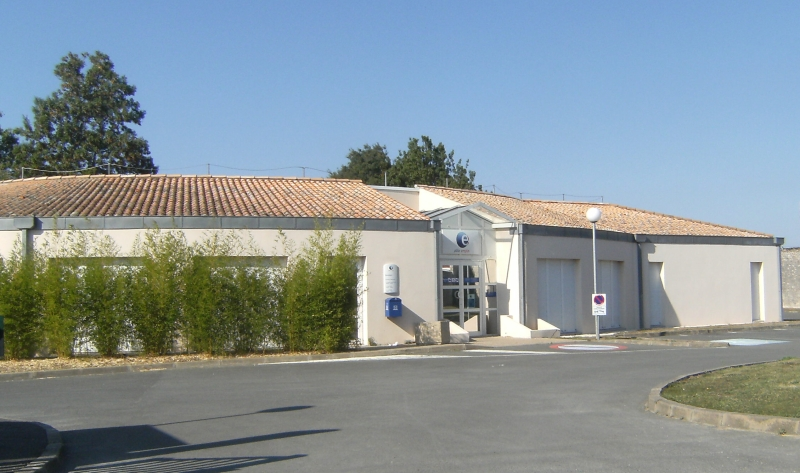
Pôle Emploi - Assedic

Assédic is the partial acronym of "Association pour l’emploi dans l’industrie et le commerce" (transl. Association for Employment in Industry and Trade). Created in 1958, it was a French agency that collected and paid unemployment insurance contributions. It was associated with the UNEDIC agency, which set the amount of the contributions. In 2009, it was merged with the ANPE into the new agency Pôle emploi.

== Missions ==
Assédic's main mission was to manage an unemployment insurance system. It collected insurance contributions paid by both employers and employees. There were 30 local Assédic in France, with more than 600 offices, which now belong to Pôle emploi. (Now France Travail)

== Structure ==
For people coming to live in France, it is very important to remember the importance of all certificates, paychecks, and other documents in nearly all aspects of French public administration. People living in France and needing unemployment support between jobs must keep the job contract, all payslips (which show all salary figures, and deductions), the "Certificat de Travail", which is proof that you have in fact worked at that enterprise, and an "Attestation de L'Employeur", designed specifically for Assédic, that shows all mathematical details of the employee's company work record.

== Flexibility ==
Assédic is flexible and up to a limit approaching your former salary, allows you to work part-time. Revenues for working part-time are not punitively deducted from your income, and they are also considered taxable but also retirement-benefit augmentation income (although at a lower level than at the standard working level). Assedic bases its allocations to an individual's revenue on the amount of money earned over a previous period, a percentage of which is calculated and awarded on a daily (compiled in the monthly allocation) basis. Therefore, if a person, over a two-year period, were to lose their job through means other than resigning voluntarily, or being dismissed for serious breaches of contract or criminal behaviour, they are entitled to a certain number of days (broken down into hours for calculation purposes) paid at a certain rate per day. If they work part-time, their regular pay is counted, the number of hours is counted, and their unused entitlement income is transferred "pro rata" into the following month.

== In popular culture ==
- Philippe Katerine mentions in his song Borderline that "the Assédics open at 9 a.m. and close at 4 p.m." (French: Les Assedic ouvrent à neuf heures, Les Assedic ferment à seize heures).
- Éric Toulis wrote a satirical song Assédic in 1994, dubbing the association as "[…] The mother of all the people who have no money" (French: La maman de tous les gens, Qui n'ont pas d'argent); the song was recorded by Les Escrocs for their album Faites-vous des Amis. The song was covered by US duo Pomplamoose in 2021.
- In his album Métèque et Mat, the rapper Akhenaton sings Éclater un type des Assédic to castigate the inefficiency of the institution and its red tape.
- Anne Sylvestre wrote a satirical song La java des assédiques about the Assédic and the intermittents du spectacle.
- Saïd M'Roumbaba, Appela Carl and Koe Pascal wrote a song titled Ferme les yeux et imagine-toi, in which a reference to the Assédic is present in the third verse.

== See also ==
- Unemployment benefits in France
  - Pôle emploi
  - UNEDIC
