= Agence nationale pour l'emploi =

French government agency

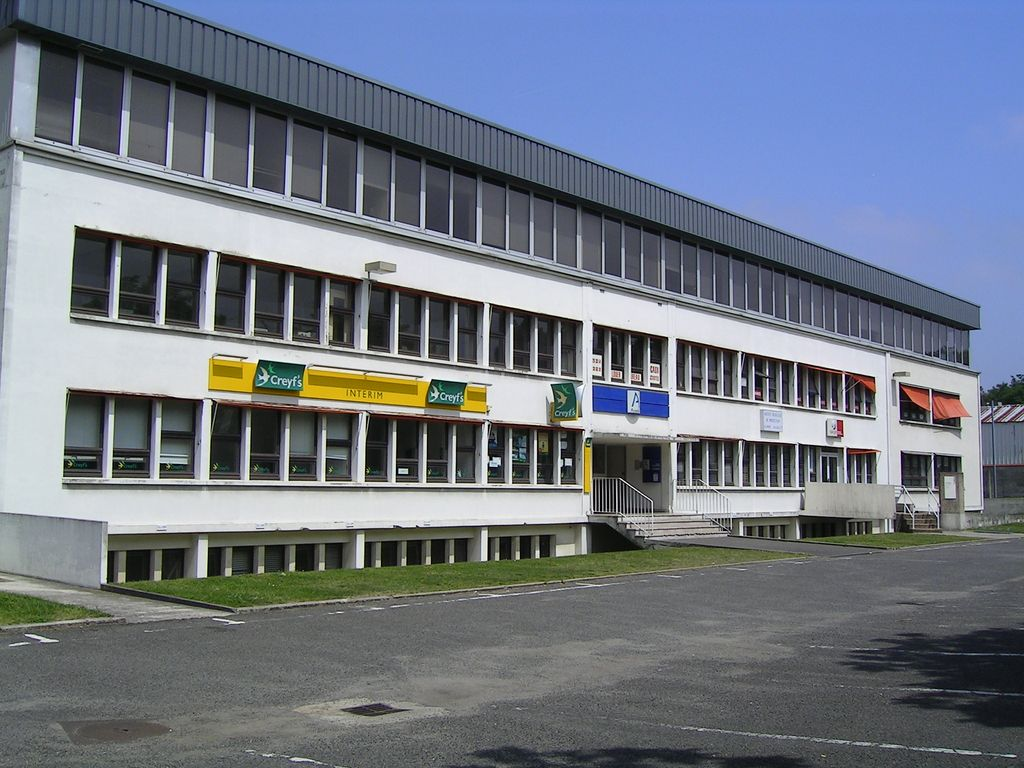
- Formation: 13 July 1967
- Dissolved: 19 December 2008
- Type: Federal employment agency
- Legal status: Government agency
- Headquarters: Noisy-le-Grand
- Region served: France
- Official language: French
- Leader: Jacques Chirac
- Website: anpe.fr

The Agence nationale pour l'emploi, or ANPE (English: "National Employment Agency" or "National Work Agency") was a French government agency which provided counseling and aid to those who are in search of a job or of training.

The ANPE was created on 13 July 1967. In December 2008, the ANPE merged with the Assedic benefits agency to create a comprehensive employment agency called Pôle emploi, based on those of Germany and the UK.

== Activity ==
The National Employment Agency (ANPE)'s main task was to encourage meetings between supply and demand, to help jobseekers find new jobs and help employers hire. With more than 3.7 million job entrusted by companies in 2007 and more than 3.3 million successful hiring, the ANPE was a central player in the labour market. It was open to all job seekers, whatever their situation, compensated or not. In 2007, 19 million maintenance consultants had been made. The main tasks were helping the unemployed back into work, supporting companies in their recruitment requirement, fighting against discrimination. To assist job seekers in their search, the agency offered services.

Starting on 1 January 2006, ANPE offered all job seekers monthly monitoring with a personal adviser referral until their return to employment. To facilitate recruitment, the ANPE had a partnership with 568,000 companies to promote the adequacy between supply and demand, including developing the skills of job seekers by training.

The ANPE administrations employed 28,459 people in France in 2007. The ANPE claimed 15 million visits per month on its website, anpe.fr. It had more than 1,300 settlements across France, with 22 regional units to define priority action plans in each region. The central administration gave the direction, planning implementation and assessing results.

== Recent evolution ==
In 1996 the registration of jobseekers was transferred to the Assedic to simplify the process.

In 1997, the official website was launched; it is now the first European website for jobs. From 2002, it has been possible for job seekers to demand jobs directly on the website. From 2003, it has published anonymous CVs profiles on the website. In 1998 the Observatoire de l'ANPE was created to publish studies.

In 2004 a National Plan against the recruitment difficulties was launched, and in 2005 an Emergency Plan for Employment was implemented. From 2006, a monthly personalized with a counselor referent has been implemented.

In 2008, a new public agency was created, resulting from the merging of the ANPE with the Unédic administration.
