= France Travail =

French governmental agency

France Employment
- France Travail

Agency overview
- Formed: December 20, 2008 (Pôle emploi)
- Preceding agencies: Agence nationale pour l'emploi; Assédic
- Jurisdiction: Government of France
- Status: Current
- Employees: 59,491
- Annual budget: 5.7€ billion EUR (2016)
- Agency executive: Thibaut Guilluy, Director
- Parent department: Minister of Labour, Employment and Economic Inclusion
- Website: www.francetravail.fr

France Travail (English: France Employment), previously Pôle emploi (French pronunciation: [pol ɑ̃plwa]; English: Employment Centre), is a French governmental agency which registers unemployed people, helps them find jobs and provides them with financial aid.

== Creation ==
In December 2007, Christine Lagarde, Minister of the Economy, unveiled the law to merge the Agence nationale pour l'emploi ("National Employment Agency") and the Assédic to the government.

The merger was an electoral pledge of candidate Nicolas Sarkozy during the 2007 presidential election to cut the unemployment rate to 5% by 2012 while aiming at improving the efficiency of public services provided to unemployed people.

On February 13, 2008, the law implementing the fusion was officially voted on.

On December 18, 2023, it has been renamed to France Travail which the name change became effective on January 1, 2024.

== Missions ==
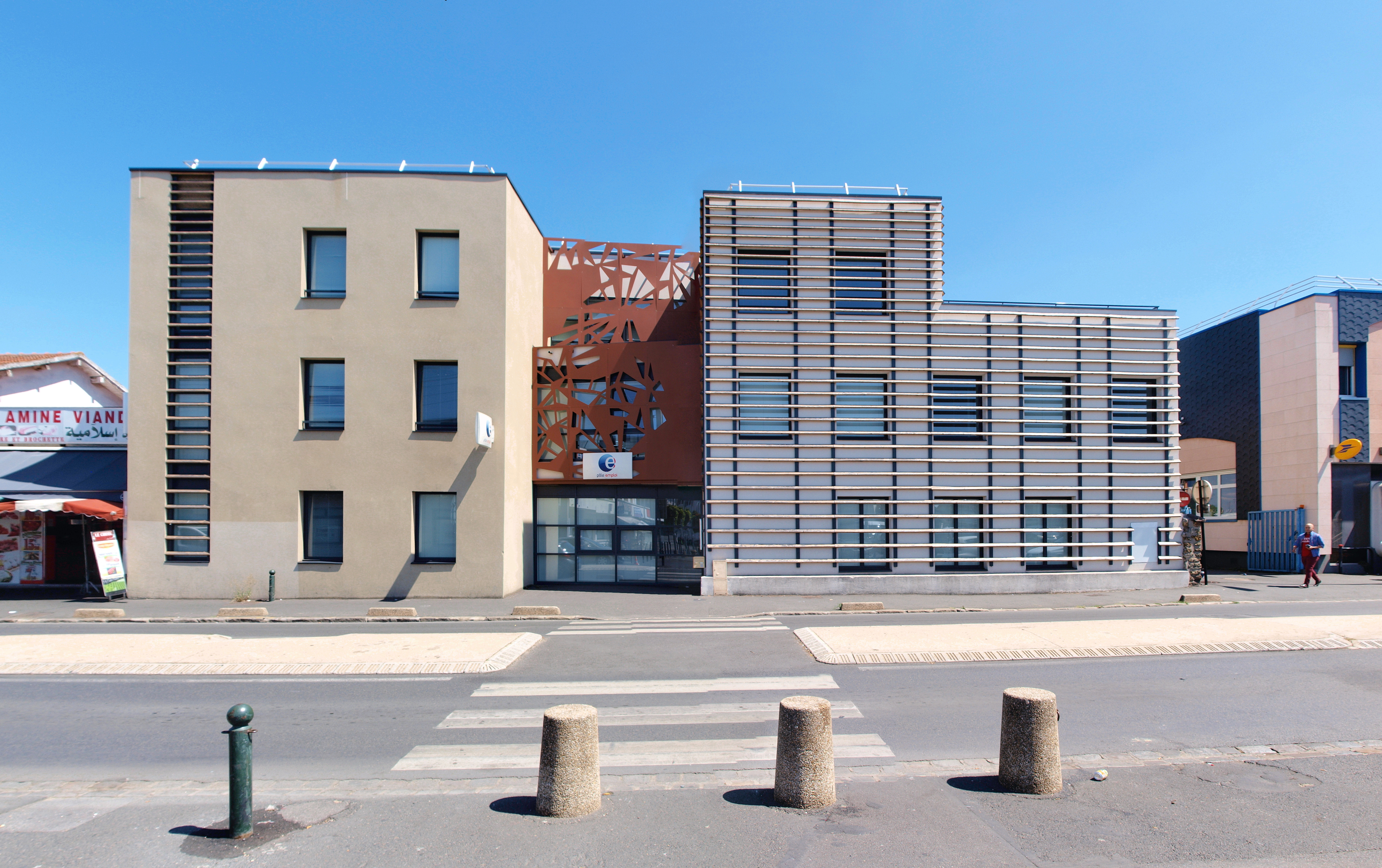
France Travail in Sainte-Geneviève-des-Bois

The missions the agency is entrusted with are ANPE and Assedic's missions combined.

France Travail receives those that have declared unemployment and provides them with social benefits, while helping companies to find candidates for a job.

France Travail publish job offers, select themselves candidates and follow their first months in the job. They develop partnerships with companies to advise them.

France Travail focuses on people notably affected by long-term unemployment, young people, seniors, and RSA-beneficiaries (state funded welfare).

France Travail collects workers' contributions to finance unemployment benefits, paid by salaries. However, the government of François Fillon said this mission would be entrusted to the URSSAF.

== Services ==
France Travail provides advice and supervises job hunting, as well as providing a platform to help companies find and hire workers.

France Travail has a single phone number (39.49) to get information on registration and benefits. There is also a single web page (pole-emploi.fr, now redirected to francetravail.fr).

Once a candidate is enrolled into France Travail, they're appointed a personal adviser who:

- helps them with their job searches
- orients candidates toward additional training
- guides their eventual integration back into the work force.

== Organisation ==
The agency employs 45,000 civil servants.

Former ANPE and Assedic agents adapted to the fusion as 30,000 out of 45,000 agents followed a one-year training course.

The ANPE and Assedic logos have disappeared from every branch. While Unedic (or Unédic) remained in existence, it became an independent agency managed by the "social partners" (trade unions and company representatives).

== Measurements ==
Pole Emploi publish monthly statistics of job-seekers. It takes into account only people registered with Pole Emploi, and distinguishes between various categories of job-seekers.

Current categories

Categories	Description
Category A	Jobless people
Category B	Job-seekers working for a short period of time (up to 78 hours a month)
Category C	Job-seekers working for a long period of time (more than 78 hours a month)
Category D	Non-available job-seekers (because of learning, disease, for instance)
Category E	Job-seekers already having a job

Former categories

Categories	Description
Category 1	Jobless and available people seeking a full-time and permanent contract job
Category 2	Jobless and available people seeking a half-time and permanent contract job
Category 3	Jobless and available people seeking a fixed-term contract job
Category 4	Jobless and non-available people seeking a job
Category 5	Job-seekers already having a job
Category 6	Jobless and non-available people seeking a full-time and permanent contract job
Category 7	Jobless and non-available people seeking a half-time and permanent contract job
Category 8	Jobless and non-available people seeking a fixed-term contract job

Difference with the ILO definition

The concept of job seekers registered at Pole Emploi is different from that of uses by the ILO.

Some registered job-seekers are not unemployed according to the ILO. Conversely, some unemployed according to the ILO definition are not registered to Pole Emploi. Data on unemployed people are based on administrative records in center jobs.

The statistics are legal rules: the Pole Emploi centers can accept people according to their availability and their activity.

According to the ILO definition, an unemployed person is a person of working age (i.e. aged 15 years or older) who does not work, not even one hour during the week, who is available to take a job within 15 days and who actively sought a job in the previous month.

In each country, a statistical survey is conducted to check whether these criteria are met.

In France, the INSEE is the body responsible for this survey, it publishes it every three months, while Pole Emploi delivers monthly statistics. There are always more people registered by Pole Emploi than people officially recognized as unemployed by the ILO.

== Official texts ==
- Official text of the law in French
- Debates at the National Assembly
- Report on the merger, by the Senate
