= Marginal employment =

Marginal employment (German: geringfügige Beschäftigung), also called a mini job or €520 job, is an employment relationship with a low absolute level of earnings or of short duration.

== Germany ==
The term Mini job was coined in Germany to describe a form of marginal employment that is generally characterized as part-time with a low wage. According to the latest law, the monthly income of a mini job is €520 or less, exempting them from income tax. With the Scholz cabinet raising the minimum wage to €12 per hour, the income cap for a mini job was increased to €520 per month since 1 October 2022. The previous increase was the 1 January 2013 from 400 to 450 euros.

In 2002 the Hartz commission recommended a series of measures to revitalise the German economy, known collectively as the Hartz concept. Gerhard Schröder implemented it as part of his Agenda 2010 reforms in 2003 as part of a labor market reform. Mini jobs were introduced as part of Hartz II, which took effect on 1 January 2003. At the time Germany had no minimum wage, which was not introduced until 2015.

The German government enacted legislation that ensures that employers pay social insurance for mini job workers. All German industries are allowed to offer mini job contracts, but the most common types of mini jobs are in the fields of catering, retail, and domestic work.

Mini jobs were first intended to legalize informal work and to become a means of promoting employment. However, mini-jobs are tax-free and relatively abundant. For this reason, mini jobs are well-liked as secondary jobs. The employer pays a lump sum of 20% (including health insurance: 8%, pension fund: 10%, wage tax: 2%, as of 1 July 2006), or 18% in the case of domestic help for the pension fund and health insurance.

The employer takes out additional accident insurance for his employees, costing about an additional €60 per year. The cost of the accident insurance differs from state to state. Employees of mini jobs must be treated the same as full-time employees, except with cause. If full-time employees receive benefits, part-time employees receive a pro-rata share. A mini job can be taken during the six weeks of maternity leave prior to giving birth and during parental leave. However, the worker is not allowed to work more than 30 hours a week. Christmas bonuses or holiday pay may cause the €520 limit to be exceeded. The employer must pay tax on such income.

In March 2009 there were about 4.9 million people in Germany on tax-free "mini jobs".

Those whose main job is a mini-job still contribute to the national retirement pension insurance. The employee pays 3.7% and the employer pays 15%. They contribute neither to the national health insurance funds nor for unemployment coverage. They can either be covered by the health insurance of a higher earning partner (or parents, for students up to 25 years of age) or contribute voluntarily at a flat rate of €140 per month.

== Spain ==
On 7 December 2011 it was reported that the European Central Bank sent a letter in August to José Luis Rodríguez Zapatero's government, suggesting that Spain implemented a mini jobs job category with salaries of €400, a value considerably lower than Spain's minimum wage of €641. This suggestion was presented as a condition for the European Central Bank to continue purchasing Spain's debt.

== United Kingdom ==
In the United Kingdom about 1.4 million people work under zero-hour contracts, with no guaranteed hours of work. A person earning under £5,772 a year receives no credits for the state pension.

In 2012, Justice Minister Liz Truss championed the idea of Britain following Germany's lead in allowing people to have tax-free and less-regulated mini jobs.

== See also ==
- UK labour law
- On-call room
- Flexicurity
- Labour market flexibility
- Precarious work
- Underemployment
- fivesquid.com
- Zero-hours contract
