= Zero-hour contract =

Employment contract with no minimum work time

A zero-hour contract is a type of employment contract in United Kingdom labour law between an employer and an employee, under which the employer is not obliged to provide any minimum number of working hours to the employee.

In 2015, employers in the UK were prohibited from offering zero-hour contracts that prevented employees from working for another employer at the same time. In September 2017, the UK Office for National Statistics estimated that there were over 900,000 workers on zero-hour contracts, 2.9% of the employed workforce.

In the UK, zero-hour contracts are controversial. Trade unions, other worker bodies, and newspapers have described them as an exploitation of labour. Employers using zero-hour contracts include Sports Direct, McDonald's and Boots.

== Definition ==
A "zero-hour contract" is a type of contract between an employer and a worker under which the employer is not obliged to provide any minimum number of working hours, and the worker is not obliged to accept any work offered. The term "zero-hour contract" is primarily used in the United Kingdom.

The employee may sign an agreement to be available for work as and when required, without specifying a particular number of hours or times of work.

Under U.K. law, a distinction is drawn between a "worker" and an "employee", an employee having more legal rights than a worker. Whether a person working under a zero-hour contract is an employee or a worker can be uncertain; however, even in cases where the plain text of the zero-hour contract designates the person as a "worker", courts have inferred an employment relationship based on the mutuality of obligation between employer and employee.

Zero-hours contracts provide basic social security benefits, including maternity/paternity pay, holiday pay, and health insurance. A zero-hour contract may differ from casual work.

== History ==
In the United Kingdom, under the National Minimum Wage Act 1998, workers on zero-hour contracts must be paid the national minimum wage for stand-by time, on-call time, and downtime. Before the introduction of the Working Time Regulations 1998 and the National Minimum Wage Regulations 1999, zero-hour contracts were sometimes used to "clock-off" staff during quiet periods while retaining them on site so they could be returned to paid work should the need arise. The National Minimum Wage Regulations require that employers pay the national minimum wage for the time workers are required to be at the workplace, even if there is no "work" to do. In the past, some employees working on a zero-hour contract have been told that they are required to obtain permission of their employer before accepting other work, but this practice has now been banned under UK legislation enacted in May 2015.

In Autoclenz Ltd v Belcher [2011] UKSC 41, the UK Supreme Court delivered a judgment on workers employed under a zero-hour contract. Lord Clarke held, at paragraph 35, that in employment relations which are characterised by inequality of bargaining power, the written terms of a contract may not in truth represent what the contract in law was.

In March 2015, the Small Business, Enterprise and Employment Act 2015 received royal assent. On a date to be appointed, Section 153 of the Act will amend the Employment Rights Act 1996, so that exclusivity terms in zero-hours contracts will no longer be enforceable, and regulations may specify other circumstances under which employers may not restrict what other work zero-hours workers can do.

== Statistics ==
As of September 2017, the Office for National Statistics estimated that there are over 900,000 workers on zero-hours contracts (2.9% of the employed workforce), up from 747,000 the previous year, with over 1.8 million such contracts (as some people may have more than one contract), with a further 1.3 million where no hours were worked. Some commentators have observed that the number of such contracts may be under-reported, as many people may be confusing them with casual employment, and may not be reporting them as temporary. The Chartered Institute of Personnel and Development (CIPD), based on a poll of 1,000 workers, reported in August 2013 that as many as 1 million workers in the United Kingdom, 3–4% of the workforce, work under the terms of a zero-hour contract. Based on a survey of 5,000 of its members, Unite, Britain's largest labour union, estimates that as many as 5.5 million workers are subject to zero-hour contracts, 22% of those employed privately. The survey, conducted by Mass 1, showed that zero-hour contracts were more prevalent in northwest England, among young workers, and in agricultural work. Often, workers said that holiday pay was illegally denied, and, in most cases, sick pay as well. The National Farmers Union, which represents farmers, supports zero-hour contracts as offering needed flexibility for tasks such as harvesting.

According to CIPD research, about 38% of those employed under zero-hours contracts considered themselves employed full-time, working 30 hours or more a week. While 66% of those on zero-hours contracts were happy with the hours they worked, 16% felt they did not have an opportunity to work enough hours. About 17% of private employers used zero-hours contracts, while 34% of non-profit organisations and 24% of public employers did. Zero-hours contracts were frequently used in hotels, catering and leisure (48%), education (35%), and healthcare (27%).

For domiciliary care workers, the incidence was reported to be as high as 55.7% of all workers during the period 2008–12.

In 2011, zero-hours contracts were in use in many parts of the UK economy:

- in the hotels and restaurants sector, 19% of all workplaces (up from 4% in 2004)
- in the health sector, 13% (up from 7%)
- in the education sector, 10% (up from 1%)

== Employers ==
Zero-hour contracts are used in the private, non-profit, and public sectors in the United Kingdom:

- Sports Direct, a retailer, has 90% of its workers on zero-hour contracts
- In August 2013, The Guardian reported that J D Wetherspoon, one of the UK's largest pub chains, has 24,000 staff, or 80% of its workforce, on contracts with no guarantee of work each week.
- 90% of McDonald's workforce in the UK – 82,000 staff members – are employed on a zero-hour contract. According to a McDonald's spokesperson, all work is scheduled in advance, with no employees "on call", and this meets the needs of workers who desire or need a flexible schedule. In 2016, the store trialled offering the chance to move off zero-hour contracts, but over 80% of staff chose to remain on them.
- A major franchise of Subway also uses the contracts, which state, "The company has no duty to provide you with work. Your hours of work are not predetermined and will be communicated to you on a weekly basis by your store manager as soon as is reasonably practicable in advance. The company has the right to require you to work varied or extended hours from time to time." Subway workers are also required, as a condition of employment, to waive their rights to limit their workweek to 48 hours.
- Burger King franchisees and Domino's Pizza operations in the UK extensively use zero-hour contracts.
- The Spirit Pub Company has 16,000 staff on zero-hour contracts.
- Boots UK has 4,000 workers on zero-hour contracts.
- Buckingham Palace, which employs 350 seasonal summer workers, also uses them.
- The National Trust, a nonprofit organisation which manages extensive historic sites and nature preserves in England, Wales, and Northern Ireland, which must deal with variable weather, uses zero-hour contracts but with the same benefits and pay as permanent employees. The Tate Galleries also use zero-hour contracts.
- All non-management staff at Curzon and Everyman cinema chains are on zero-hour contracts.
- Cineworld, a leading cinema chain, uses zero-hour contracts for 3,600 people, about 80% of its workforce, and Stephen Wiener, the founder, stated in August 2013 that he will continue using them.
- CeX

The Workplace Employment Relations Survey conducted by the UK government in 2004 and 2011 shows that the proportion of workplaces with some employees on zero-hours contracts increased from 4% in 2004 to 8% in 2011. The survey found that larger companies are more likely to use zero-hours contracts. 23% of workplaces with 100 or more employees used zero-hours contracts in 2011, compared with 11% of those with 50–99 employees and 6% of those with fewer than 50 employees.

== Controversy ==
In the UK, zero-hour contracts are controversial. British business leaders have supported them, stating that they provide a flexible labour market. It is argued they may suit some people, such as retirees and students, who want occasional earnings and can be entirely flexible about when they work. It has been reported that 60% of people on zero-hour contracts are happy with the hours they work. Trade union groups and others have raised concerns about exploitation and the use of such contracts by management as a tool to reward or reprimand employees for any reason, meaningful or trivial. They also raise concerns about how workers can adequately assert their employment rights or maintain decent employment relations. A Channel 4 documentary broadcast on 1 August 2013 claimed that Amazon used "controversial" zero-hour contracts as a tool to reprimand staff.

Workers subject to zero-hour contracts are vulnerable to exploitation as they may be denied work at any time, for any reason, including for declining to respond to a request to work. A refusal to work in any instance, for any reason, can result in a prolonged period of unemployment. Due to the uncertainty of the workers' schedules, zero-hour contracts present problems for workers with children due to the difficulty of arranging child care. The rapidly growing use of zero-hour contracts was the subject of a series of articles in late July 2013 by The Guardian and, as of 2013, was of concern to Parliament. Vince Cable, the business secretary of the government, considered closer regulation of the contracts but ruled out a ban. Labour MPs Alison McGovern and Andy Sawford campaigned to ban or better regulate the practice.

In 2016, several UK chains that had been using zero-hour contracts announced that they would phase them out during 2017. These included Sports Direct and two cinema chains, Curzon and Everyman. However, Cineworld, another leading cinema chain that also owns Picturehouse, has come under scrutiny for continuing to use the contract format, with the Ritzy living wage protests at London's Ritzy Cinema especially prominent.

In 2020, a campaign called Zero Hours Justice was set up. Led by Ian Hodson, president of the Bakers, Food and Allied Workers Union, and backed by Julian Richer, it was launched to end zero-hours contracts.

== Praise ==
The Institute of Directors, a chartered organisation of British business leaders, has defended the contracts as providing a flexible labour market, citing the lack of flexibility in Italy and Spain. Jacob Rees-Mogg MP has also argued that they benefit employees, including students, by providing flexibility, and could provide a route into more permanent employment.

== Elsewhere in the world ==
Casual labour contracts in Canada can have "no guaranteed minimum hours", place "no obligation on the employer to provide work", and pay can be "pro rated in line with hours worked".

In 2015 in New Zealand, the television show Campbell Live revealed that large corporate hospitality companies such as Burger King and McDonald's, KFC, Starbucks, Pizza Hut, Carl's Jr. (all under Restaurant Brands), Sky City and Hoyts, all use zero-hour contracts to reduce costs. On 9 April, Restaurant Brands agreed to do away with zero-hours contracts.

A bill outlawing zero-hour contracts in New Zealand was unanimously passed on 10 March 2016 and went into effect on 1 April.

Zero-hour contracts have been banned in the Republic of Ireland since 2018, with limited exceptions. Employment Regulation Orders in place in multiple industries, for example Security guarantee minimum paid hours if an employee is rostered for below a specified number of hours per shift and require minimum notice of rostered hours.

== See also ==
- Casual employment (contract)
- Contingent work
- Fivesquid.com
- Flexicurity
- Labour market flexibility
- Marginal employment
- On call shift
- On-call room
- Precarious work
- Reserve army of labour
- Shift-based hiring
- United Kingdom labour law
- Underemployment
- Wage slavery
- Work–life balance
- Workforce casualisation
