= Oral debriefing =

Oral debriefing is the interview process of obtaining detailed verbal testimony from individuals. Analogous to interviews that are undertaken in journalism and sociology, its outcome in a comprehensive form is also known as ‘oral history’. Its application is additionally evident in disciplines ranging from psychotherapy, witness interrogation in crime investigations and in industry and commerce, both in oral and visual formats.

In the latter, it is now associated with knowledge management, where the discipline is getting more attention since the advent of the flexible labor market, which is the single biggest knowledge disrupter of modern times. Introducing the biggest change in workplace practice for more than a century, the flexible labor market has imposed on employers an Alheimer-like corporate amnesia as employees change jobs on average every four or five years in many countries. The loss of ‘organizational memory’, the body of data, information and knowledge relevant to an individual organization's existence, is massive, inhibiting the ability of organizations to learn from their own experiences. Oral debriefing is becoming increasingly recognized as a powerful tool with which to capture this exiting institutional knowledge.

== History ==
In its contemporary formulation, the techniques of oral debriefing were first explored in the US in the 1940s in New Deal projects to preserve the reminiscences of former slaves and unlettered rural folk, and then in Europe. Its first cheerleader and practitioner was the American social commentator and writer Studs Terkel (). Born in 1912 and trained as a lawyer before becoming a journalist and writer, his fascination with the medium came soon after the tape recorder's commercial exploitation when he started interviewing a whole cross-section of American society in order to piece together a jig-saw of experiences. From taxis drivers and teachers, the poor and the rich, young and old, his books on subjects ranging from race relations to war have provided a rich range of social opinion and attitudes of a nation undergoing rapid social change.

Terkel's pioneering work was concurrent with the efforts of the US academic Professor Allan Nivens who, after successfully persuading educationalists to introduce oral history as a tool for serious scholarship in the 1940s, founded the Oral History Collection at Columbia University (http://library.truman.edu/microforms/columbia_oral_history.htm). Since then other universities, including Harvard, Princeton, the University of California, Berkeley, have also developed extensive collections of oral history. In the early 1950s Nivens brought oral history to industry when he organised the interview of more than 400 people for a history of the Ford Motor Company. Since then a handful of companies have supported similar programs, among them ARCO, Beckman Instruments, Bristol-Myers, Eli Lilley, Kaiser Aluminum and Chemical, Monsanto, Procter & Gamble, Rohm and Haas and Standard Oil Company.

In Europe, most of the efforts in oral history have been confined to non-business activities, where its use is relatively widespread in sociological and straight historical research. In a rare business-type project called "City Lives”, the National Life Story Collection attached to the British Library Sound Archive has been interviewing about 100 top men and women from financial institutions who have lived through the changes since WW2 (http://www.bl.uk/reshelp/findhelprestype/sound/ohist/ohnls/nationallifestories.html). Aside from that, only a small number of British companies have undertaken projects to record the memories and experiences of their employees, among them London Transport, which has made a special effort with their West Indian workforce, the brewers Bass, the telecommunications company Cable & Wireless and, until the project was aborted in 1991 as a cost-saving exercise, Ford UK. The uses to which they have put the information have generally been for museum exhibits or public relations.

=== Exit interviews enhanced ===
Modern oral debriefing is an enhancement of the old-fashioned prescriptive and formulaic exit interview, which is typically not an interview at all, rather the output of a formulaic questionnaire that attempts to uncover why employees – usually lower hierarchy workers - leave. The oral debrief has been sophisticated to the extent that its output is now a powerful means of extracting from individuals valuable knowledge that can be used to improve on past performance.

The most accomplished practitioners are the US military, which has developed vast archives of oral testimony of wars since WW2 specifically as an educational tool for successive generations. The Department of the Army, for example, calls the process the End of Tour (EoT) interviews, which are conducted with departing commanders to make interviews available to their incoming replacements so that individuals can better understand the issues faced by their predecessors. Equally, companies such as Ford, ARCO, Beckman Instruments, Bristol-Myers, Eli Lilley, Kaiser Aluminum and Chemical, Monsanto, Procter & Gamble, Rohm and Haas and Standard Oil Company have also initiated programs of oral history but their application in decision-making is tentative.

The oral debriefing usually centres on the issues and decisions unique to the organization and can be especially instructive as a decision-making tool. With senior decision-makers the most common candidates, such debriefings are always conducted near the end of a person's tenure, although some practitioners are now using it on a more regular basis and in project management.

Whilst the co-operation of interviewees is essential, the quality of recall is often dependent on the skill of the interviewer, who needs to be commanding enough not to be intimidated by the interviewee and insightful enough to identify and pursue pertinent questions. The actual skill of oral debriefing is the art of asking relevant questions and when the answers are unclear or fudged, the asking of even more probing questions.

In the world of evidential gathering where rigorous substantiation is a pre-requisite for all experiential learning, the oral route is often more valuable than anything extracted from written sources. The reason is that managers are generally better speakers than they are writers. Also, their spoken word is invariably a more efficient way of conveying the abstract and complex nature of elements like the nuances of corporate culture, management style and the often-obscure issues surrounding decision-making within groups. Importantly, it can be effective at capturing the tacit ‘humanware’ elements of organizational memory.

=== The other types of oral debriefing ===
In addition to the augmented exit interview there are three other types of oral debriefing.

The biographical debrief focuses on an individual's life or career. Conducted at stages during or at the end of an individual's career, it is usually directed at very senior officers, often founders or people with decisive effects on organizational development. Its educational value to the organization is important because it can provide industry- and organization-specific insights into such aspects as culture, values and the way strategy would have altered over time alongside a changing market place. Separately, it also doubles as a motivator to successive generations.

The second type is the subject debrief, which concentrates on obtaining knowledge about a single event or topic, such as a product launch or new building development, where research may require interviews with several people to obtain complete coverage. Its application is valuable when project performance is often over budget or overdue.

Thirdly there is the critical incident debrief, which, as it suggests, occurs when there is an unexpected event, usually something damaging. Debriefs are usually carried out as soon after the episode as possible and include as many of the people involved, even non-managers.

The debriefs provide only the evidential component of experiential learning. The learning arises when the experience (from oral debriefing and other sources) is assessed and then assigned its own meaning in terms of individual and/or the organization's own goals, aims, ambitions and expectations. From these processes come the insights and added meaning, which is then applied to new circumstances. The end product is better decision-making.

== See also ==
- Organizational memory (OM)
- Corporate amnesia
- Flexible labor market
- Corporate history
- Corporate culture
- Corporate memory
- Information Age
- Episodic knowledge
- Explicit knowledge
- Tacit knowledge
- Evidence based practice
- Mentoring
- Productivity

== Sources ==
Arnold Kransdorff, Corporate Amnesia, Butterworth Heineman, 1998. Also Arnold Keransdorff, Corporate DNA, Gower Publishing, 2006.
