= Magnus Harmonica Corporation =

Manufacturer of harmonicas and reed organs

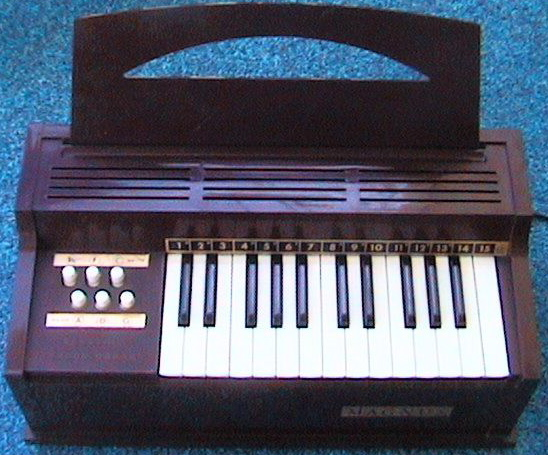
Magnus Chord Organ Model 300

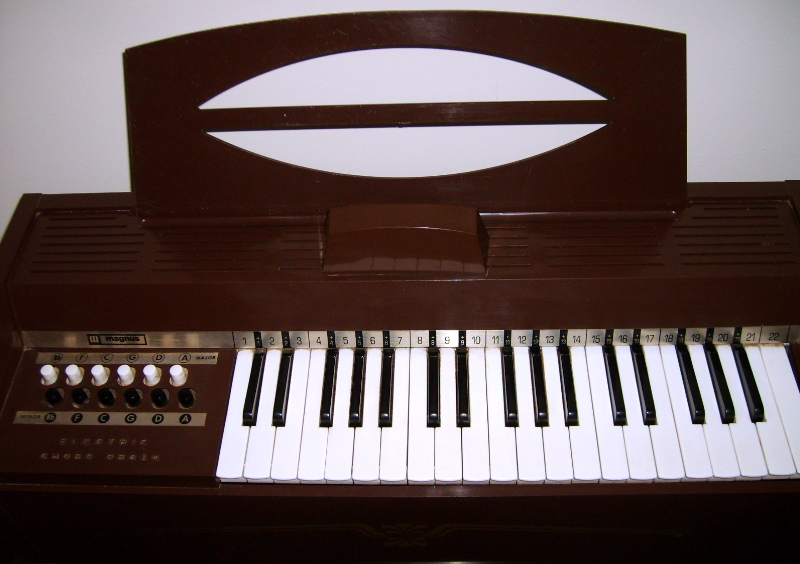
Magnus Chord Organ Model 670

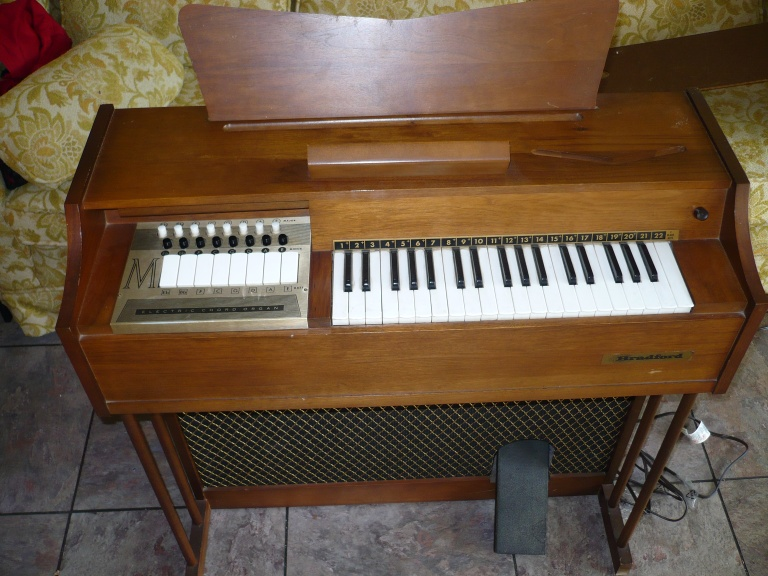
Magnus Chord Organ Model 890

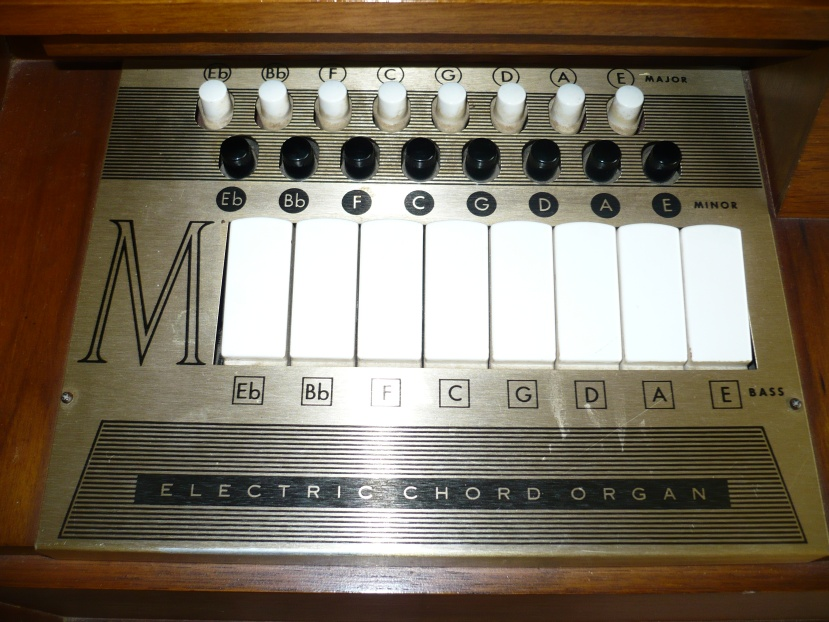
Magnus Chord Organ, Chord Pad, Model 890

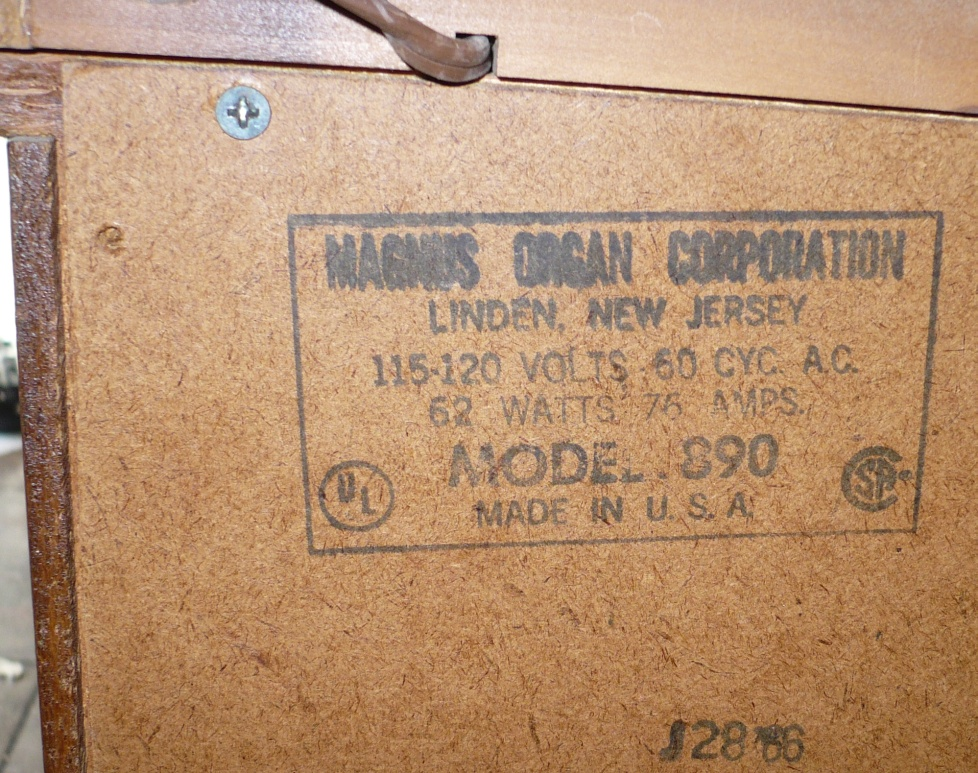
Magnus Chord Organ Model 890, manufacturer stamp

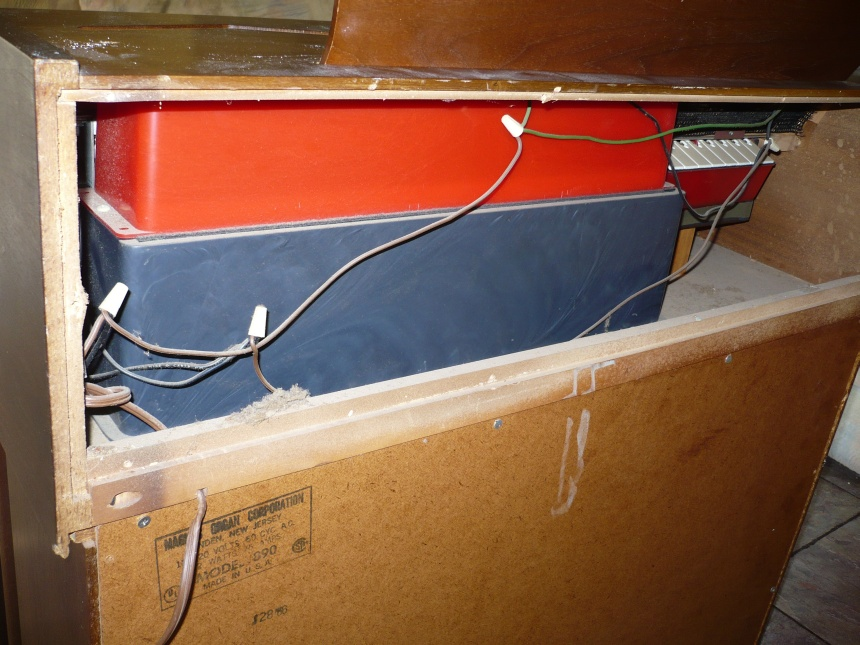
Magnus Chord Organ Model 890, inside blower detail

The Magnus Harmonica Corporation (originally the International Plastic Harmonica Corporation) was founded in 1944 in New Jersey by Danish immigrant Finn Magnus (1905–1976). First supplying American troops in World War II, and later marketed to children and other beginners, the company's harmonicas (as well as its accordions, bagpipes, and mechanical reed organs) used a then-unique molded-plastic reed comb. The styrene-based plastic construction resulted in lower cost, greater durability, and a distinct sound compared to other free reed aerophones with metal reeds.

In 1958, Magnus joined with television salesman Eugene Tracey, and their company went on to sell millions of inexpensive electric chord organs and song books until the late 1970s under the name Magnus Organ Corporation. Early Magnus Chord Organs were either laptop or tabletop models, with some of the later models having integrated legs and a lighted music stand. At its peak, Magnus employed over 1,800 workers in Linden, New Jersey, including a "mother's shift" during school hours and a "work release" program for non-violent inmates of the nearby Rahway State Prison.

After Magnus and Tracey retired, the publishers of World Book Encyclopedia ultimately acquired the Magnus sheet music catalog and ceased production of Magnus instruments.

== Magnus organ models ==
- 300: Tabletop Model, Two Octave, Six Major chord, Brown or Cream Plastic Case - c. 1960s
- 302: Tabletop Model, Two Octave, Six Major chord, Brown Plastic Case with faux wood
- 303: Free-Standing Model, Three Octave, Six Major chord, Six Minor chord, Brown Plastic Case - c. 1970s
- 306: Free-Standing Model, Three Octave, Six Major chord, Six Minor chord, Brown Plastic Case
- 350: Tabletop Model, Two Octave, Six Major chord, Brown Plastic Case
- 360: Tabletop Model, Two Octave, Six Major chord, Cream Plastic Case - c. 1970s
- 380: Tabletop Model, Two Octave, Six Major chord, Cream Plastic Case with faux wood - c. 1960s
- 391: Tabletop Model, Three Octave, Six Major chord, Six Minor chord, Brown Plastic Case - c. 1970s
- 400: Tabletop Model, Three Octave, Six Major chord, Six Minor chord, Brown Plastic Case - c. 1970s
- 468: Tabletop Model, Three Octave, Six Major chord, Six Minor chord, Cream Plastic Case - c. 1970s
- 481: Tabletop Model, Three Octave, Six Major chord, Six Minor chord, Brown Plastic Case - c. 1970s
- 500: Tabletop Model, Three Octave, Six Major chord, Six Minor chord, Real Wood Case
- 535: Free-Standing Model, Three Octave, Six Major chord, Six Minor chord, Real Wood Case - c. 1968/69
- 545: Free-Standing Model, Three Octave, Six Major chord, Six Minor chord, Real Wood Case
- 549: Free-Standing Model, Three Octave, Six Major chord, Six Minor chord, Six Bass Notes - c. 1960s
- 580: Free-Standing Model, Three Octave, Six Major chord, Six Minor chord, Faux Wood Case
- 655: Tabletop Model, Three Octave, Six Major chord, Six Minor chord, Faux Wood Case
- 657: Tabletop Model, Three Octave, Six Major chord, Six Minor chord, Brown Plastic Case with faux wood - c. 1970s
- 660: Free-Standing Model, Three Octave, Six Major chord, Six Minor chord, Six Seventh chord, Brown Plastic Case
- 665: Tabletop Model, Three Octave, Six Major chord, Six Minor chord, Brown Plastic Case with faux wood - c. 1970s
- 668: Tabletop Model, Three Octave, Six Major chord, Six Minor chord, Brown Plastic Case
- 670: Free-Standing Model, Three Octave, Six Major chord, Six Minor chord, Brown Plastic Case - c. 1970s
- 700: Tabletop Model, Three Octave, Eight Major chord, Eight Minor chord, Faux Wood Case
- 890: Free-Standing Model, Three Octave, Eight Major chord, Eight Minor chord, Eight Bass Notes, Wood Case - c. 1960s
- 1510: Laptop Model, Two Octave, No Chord buttons, Brown Bakelite Case - c. 1950s
- 8100: Tabletop Model, Three Octave, Six Major chord, Six Minor chord, Brown Plastic Case - c. 1960s
- Disney Edition: Same as Model 360 but has Orange Plastic Case - c. late 1970s
