= Organizational memory =

Data and information held by an organization

Organizational memory (OM), sometimes called institutional memory or corporate memory, is the accumulated body of data, information, and knowledge created in the course of an organization's existence. The concept of organizational memory includes the ideas of components knowledge acquisition, knowledge processing or maintenance, and knowledge usage like search and retrieval. Falling under the wider disciplinary umbrella of knowledge management, it has two repositories: an organization's archives, including its electronic data bases; and individuals' memories.

Organizational memory can only be applied if it can be accessed. To make use of it, organizations must have effective retrieval systems for their archives and members with good memory recall. Its importance to an organization depends upon how well individuals can apply it, a discipline known as experiential learning or evidence-based practice. In the case of individuals, organizational memory's accuracy is invariably compromised by the inherent limitations of human memory. Individuals' reluctance to admit to mistakes and difficulties compounds the problem. The actively encouraged flexible labor market has imposed an Alzheimer's-like corporate amnesia on organizations that creates an inability to benefit from hindsight.

== Nature ==
Organizational memory is composed of:

- Prior data and information
- All internally generated documentation related to the organization's activities
  - Intellectual property (patents, copyrights, trademarks, brands, registered design, trade secrets and processes whose ownership is granted to the company by law, licensing and partnering agreements)
  - Details of events, products and individuals (including relationships with people in outside organizations and professional bodies),
- Relevant published reference material
- Institution-created knowledge

Of these, institution-created knowledge is the most important.

The three main facets of organizational memory are data, information, and knowledge. It is important to understand the differences between each of these.

Data is a fact depicted as a figure or a statistic, while data in context—such as in a historical time frame—is information.

By contrast, knowledge is interpretative and predictive. Its deductive character allows a person with knowledge to understand the implications of information, and act accordingly. The term has been defined variously by different experts: Alvin Goldman described it as justified true belief; Bruce Aune saw it as information in context; Verna Alee defined it as experience or information that can be communicated or shared; and Karl Wiig said it was a body of understanding and insights for interpreting and managing the world around us.

The word knowledge comes from the Saxon word cnaw-lec. The suffix lec has become, in modern English, -like. So, knowledge means "cnaw-like", with cnaw meaning "emerge". Its best interpretation, then, is that it is an emergent phenomenon, an extension of existing erudition.

Once knowledge is documented, it reverts to being information. New knowledge—what some academics call knowledge in action—is that which is either created incrementally, accidentally, or through innovation. Incremental knowledge is the product of prior experience that is already established and recognized—so-called "organic learning" that builds one experience on another (also known as existent or historical knowledge). It is the most common form of learning. By way of a simple illustration, existent knowledge is the established awareness that, because it is hot, it is necessary to avoid sunburn and dehydration. Existent knowledge becomes new knowledge when (for example) a European on a summer vacation in Mexico, being used to wearing a cap on sunny days at home, decides to wear a sombrero.

The second type of knowledge, accidental knowledge, happens unexpectedly—such as what happened in 1928 when a mold spore drifted onto a culture dish in the laboratory of Scottish research scientist Alexander Fleming while he was on a two-week holiday. It seeded a blue mold—penicillin—that killed off a harmful bacterium.

The third type of knowledge, innovative knowledge, is the labor of genius, such as the work of Leonardo da Vinci—who, in the late 15th century, conceptualized cutting-edge ideas like the aeroplane, the parachute, cranes, submarines, tanks, water pumps, canals, and drills. Innovative knowledge encompasses the type of learning that leapfrogs the other types, and—in da Vinci's case—was so advanced that it had to wait hundreds of years for incremental learning to catch up.

== The difference between explicit and tacit knowledge ==
In its modern understanding, knowledge is made up of explicit knowledge, sometimes called skilled knowledge; and tacit or cognitive knowledge (sometimes known as "coping skills"), a category first identified by Michael Polanyi in 1958.

Explicit knowledge is the "what" of know-how: knowledge such as the professional or vocational skills that are recorded in manuals, textbooks, and training courses. Tacit knowledge, on the other hand, is the non-technical "how" of getting things done—what Edward de Bono, the inventor of lateral thinking, calls operacy, or the skill of action, and what Peter Drucker identifies in the use of the word techne, the Greek for "skill". Much of it is implicit and ambiguous, acquired largely by functional, context-specific experience. Typically existing only in the minds of individuals, tacit knowledge is normally difficult to capture, with most organizations depending almost entirely on the explicit knowledge. This makes experiential learning, productivity gains, and competitiveness slow and expensive to acquire. In business terms, tacit knowledge is a passive misnomer for active sharing of knowledge to make an organization more effective. Training programs, for instance, cannot be limited to a source-recipient model, and should leverage mutual exchanges across generations.

The reality is that even though most organizational work processes are largely designed around documentation, much remains unrecorded, especially that to do with decision-making. The record often reflects the desire to gloss over disagreements and serious questions, or the desire to sell or excuse.

Given the high levels of corporate amnesia in commerce and industry, some organizations are turning to new techniques to preserving their organizational memory and, in particular, their tacit knowledge. The latest capture tools to get attention are the traditional corporate history, usually produced once or twice every 100 years as a public relations medium; and oral debriefing, an augmentation of the old-fashioned prescriptive and formulaic exit interview. Instead of hagiography, organizational memory is being produced as an induction and educational tool that transmits long-term information. Oral debriefing, which concentrates on short- and medium-term memory, targets exiting and key occupant employees, recurring corporate events, and important projects in detailed testimony of participants. Both are designed to extract tacit knowledge in an easily accessible format that also generates the "lessons of history". Its permanent character also means that it does not have to be continually reproduced, just updated, and that its necessary re-interpretation alongside changing circumstances is predicated on a more reliable evidential base.

== How experiential learning works ==
When it comes to experiential learning, an awareness of both the explicit and tacit components of organizational memory on their own is not generally enough to create new knowledge efficiently. As a general rule, it needs to be accompanied by a focused learning phase.

Most models of experiential learning are cyclical and have three basic phases:

1. Awareness of an experience or problem situation;
2. A reflective phase within which the learner examines the OM around the experience and draws erudition from that reflection; and
3. A testing phase within which the new insights or learnings, having been integrated with the learner's own conceptual framework, are applied to a new problem situation or experience.

The concept's starting point is that individuals or organizations seldom learn from experience, unless the experience is assessed and then assigned its own meaning in terms of individual and/or the organization's own goals, aims, ambitions, and expectations. From these processes come insights and added meaning, which is then applied to new circumstances. The end product is better decision-making.

== Types ==
Organizational memory can be subdivided into the following types:

Professional
Reference material, documentation, tools, methodologies
Company
Organizational structure, activities, products, participants
Individual
Status, competencies, know-how, activities
Project
Definition, activities, histories, results

== Exploring ==
Key decisions organizations make when exploring organizational memory include:

- What knowledge representation to use (stories, patterns, cases, rules, predicate logic, etc.)
- Who will be the users - what are their information and learning needs?
- How to ensure security and who will be granted access
- How to best integrate with existing sources, stores and systems
- What to do to ensure the current content is correct, applicable, timely and weeded
- How to motivate experts to contribute
- What to do about ephemeral insights, how to capture informal scripts (e.g. e-mail and instant-messenger posts).

Most commercial knowledge management efforts have included building some form of organizational memory to capture expertise, speed learning, help the organization remember, record decision rationale, document achievements, or learn from past failures.

== See also ==
- Bus factor
- Collective memory
- Corporate culture
- Episodic knowledge
- Evidence based practice
- Information Age
- Institutional memory
- Knowledge tagging
- Mentoring
- Missing stair
- Organizational intelligence

== Bibliography ==
- Brooking, Annie (1998). Corporate Memory: Strategies for Knowledge Management. Thompson Business Press. ISBN 9781861522689.
- March, J (1991). "Exploration and Exploitation in Organizational Learning". Organization Science. 2 (1): 71–87. doi:10.1287/orsc.2.1.71.
- Arnold Kransdorff, Corporate Amnesia, Butterworth Heineman, 1998.
- Arnold Kransdorff, Corporate DNA, Gower Publishing, 2006.
- Walsh, James P; Ungson, Gerardo Rivera (1991). "Organizational Memory". The Academy of Management Review. 16 (1): 57–91. doi:10.2307/258607. JSTOR 258607.
