= Corporate amnesia =

Loss of shared knowledge and experience

Corporate amnesia is a phrase used to describe a situation in which businesses, and other types of co-operative organizations, lose their memory of how to do things. The condition is held, by some people, to be analogous to individual amnesia.

== Cause and effect ==
The causes are various. Employees have an inherent short and selective memory recall alongside a defensiveness that screens out unwelcome events with which they and their employer are involved. Flanking this are the effects of the single biggest change in workplace practice for at least a century - the actively encouraged flexible labor market. In many countries, employee turnover - the rate at which old employees leave and new ones arrive - is now above the recognised annual danger level of 10% in many industry sectors where productivity starts to be affected.

What happens, is that the knowledge and experience known as organizational memory (OM) - the unrecorded event-specific, organization-specific, and time-specific ‘how’ of know-how that characterizes any organization's ability to perform - walks out of the front door on a regular basis. Jobs change was initially related to downsizing but it is now a general feature of the labor market, where, on average, annual employee churn exceeds 20% in many countries and up to 60% in some industries.

=== Cost ===
Firstly, the organization has to continually re-learn its tried-and-tested practice. Induction periods of up to 12 months are typical – and expensive, with direct costs variously calculated at 46% of annual pay for a front-line employee to 240% for a middle manager.

Secondly, the body of evidence that would otherwise be available for better decision-making is reduced, a situation that affects the ability of organizations to learn efficiently from their own experiences. By encouraging high levels of job churn, organizations have consciously chosen to operate in isolation from their own hard-won and expensively acquired experience, depending on others’ unrelated experiences. This is even more expensive than having to re-learn, with experiential non-learning estimated by an international management consultant to cost up to 9.7% of the gross domestic product in many developed countries.

Also known as institutional forgetting, corporate amnesia is among the biggest constraints to decision-making excellence and a massive contributor to productivity shortfalls.

== Knowledge management ==
Both corporate amnesia and organizational memory are part of the new vocabulary associated with the broader discipline known as Knowledge Management (KM) under the even wider umbrella of the Information Age. In its conception, organisational memory (OM) consists of the institution's documentation, objects and artifacts, that are stored in the corporate library/electronic database, and which can be applied alongside resident employees who are intimate with institution-specific events and experiences. The physical evidence is known as explicit knowledge while the more cerebral is called tacit knowledge. They are integral for efficient decision-making and experiential learning to build on success, and escape the pandemic of repeated mistakes, re-invented wheels, and other unlearned lessons that litter modern industry.

Because of the high levels of jobs churn in the modern workplace, however, much of the mind-resident tacit knowledge is now non-existent within organizations, with employers believing that the imported tacit knowledge from employees hired from other institutions is an adequate stand-in that can be replaced by osmosis.

Tacit knowledge, sometimes called cognitive knowledge or coping skills, is a category of knowledge first identified by Michael Polanyi in 1958, described as the non-technical "how" of getting things done, what Edward de Bono calls "operacy" or the skill of action, and what Peter Drucker identifies in the use of the word techne (Greek for "skill"). Much of it is implicit and ambiguous, and is acquired largely by experience that is functional as well as context- and institution-specific.

The collective awareness of such knowledge and forms of practice provides the type of expertise that is both an organisation's adhesive and its lubricant - i.e. it relates to all the routines and processes (formal or otherwise) that make an organization tick. Its value represents the capability of the firm and is perhaps the main ingredient of its resilience. In broad-brush terms, it includes the individual's understanding and accommodation of their employer's corporate culture, habits, management, communications, and decision-making style, the contacts and relationships between employees or teams of employees, the detail of job-related events and the knowledge of tried and tested usage as it applies to the organization's market circumstances and special environment (so-called episodic memory). The qualitative application of organisational memory is closely allied to memory, which is most commonly described as knowledge retention or the difference between having acquired knowledge and having to re-acquire it. It is what is not forgotten; the reconstruction of experienced events.

== Organizational memory ==
For practical purposes, organizational memory (OM) can be broken down into three distinct time frames. Short-term OM lasts up to about five years; medium-term OM occupies a time frame of up to around ten years, with periods in excess of this constituting long-term OM. Typically existing only in the minds of individuals, it is normally very difficult to share and to capture. Because of its contemporary and contiguous nature, short- and medium-term OM is generally more relevant to operational issues facing the organization, whilst long-term OM is more conformant with strategy and culture.

The phenomenon of corporate amnesia was first identified by the British knowledge management specialist Arnold Kransdorff in his 1998 book of the same name. By then the flexible labor market had been in tow for more than two decades. Employees in many developed countries, who could previously be expected to have had one or two jobs in their working lifetimes, were now employer-hopping every four or five years in a workplace where redundancy was – and still is - commonplace.

== Capture tools ==
Knowledge loss is not entirely ignored in industry and commerce. In an attempt to capture and use its departing know-how, some organizations depend on intranets, electronic bulletin boards, theatrical improvisations, social networks and mentoring, but these channels all suffer from the effects of individuals’ memory loss, their defensiveness about failures, short jobs tenure and – above all – an inability to apply employee-specific precedent to better decision-making. To date the management of organizational memory is an unformalized discipline, not least because of the widespread lack of understanding of tacit knowledge, the prevalent belief that experiential learning is all about learning from others’ experience – what is called benchmarking - and the informal and theoretical ways managers are taught how to benefit from hindsight.

The latest capture tools to get attention are the traditional corporate history, usually seen as a public relations medium, and oral debriefing, an augmentation of the old-fashioned prescriptive and formulaic exit interview. The former is being produced as an induction/educational tool that transmits long-term memory while the latter, which concentrates on short- and medium-term memory, targets exiting and key occupant employees, recurring corporate events and important projects in detailed testimony of participants. Both are designed to extract tacit knowledge in an easily accessible format that also generates the ‘lessons of history’. Its permanent character also means that it does not have to be continually reproduced and that its necessary re-interpretation alongside changing circumstances is predicated on a more reliable evidential base.

In the world of evidential gathering where rigorous substantiation is a pre-requisite for experiential learning, the oral route is seen as more valuable than anything extracted from internally produced written sources. The reason its developers give is that individuals are generally better speakers than they are writers. Also, their spoken word is invariably a more efficient way of conveying the abstract and complex nature of ‘humanware’ elements like the nuances of corporate culture, management style and the often-obscure issues surrounding decision-making within groups. To further formalize what up to now has been a largely theoretical teaching process, the capture methodologies have also been applied directly to decision-making through an adaptation to the modern workplace of the experiential learning models developed by academic David Kolb and others’.

== Sabotage ==
Corporate amnesia can be a result of sabotage by a disgruntled employee. If an employee is sacked, or is aggrieved for some other reason, he/she may seek revenge by deleting files from the company's computer. This risk can be minimised by effective backup procedures.

== See also ==
- Corporate history
- Corporate culture
- Corporate memory
- Episodic knowledge
- Evidence based practice
- Explicit knowledge
- Organizational culture
- Oral debriefing
- Organizational memory (OM)
- Information Age
- Mentoring
- Productivity
- Tacit knowledge
