= Cross-training (business) =

Cross-training in business operations, also known as multiskilling, involves training employees for flexible response to changing production schedules.

Cross-training has been closely linked to cellular manufacturing—for example, in a book segment, "Cross Training in Cells and Flow Lines." That linkage is more thoroughly discussed in a book by Suri, which includes the benefits of posting in the work place a training matrix: Each employee in the area is listed as a row on the matrix, with various skills as columns. As an employee masters a skill, a check mark is entered in the matrix. Having multiple check marks becomes a visual source of recognition and pride by the employee.

Sometimes, as an enabler of cross-training, the company adopts (perhaps as an element of a contract with the labor union) skill-base pay, which refers to a pay-for-skills incentive; for example, for each new skill mastered, the employee's wage rate is increased by some amount, such as $0.50 per hour.

A close partner of cross-training is job rotation. That is, for a multi-skilled employee to maintain skill levels, it is necessary for that employee periodically to rotate among jobs calling for those skills—and to do so often enough that skills do not deteriorate. As one example, at Signicast Corp., Milwaukee, Wisc (producing investment castings) cross-trained operatives rotated among jobs every 4 to 6 hours.

The concept of cross-training for front-line associates can apply also to the technical and professional staff—in that case being referred to as cross-careering.

== Advantages ==
- Helps patrons/customers/clients in the long run, as employees are empowered to answer questions about the entire organization.
- Requires staff to re-evaluate the reasons and methods for accomplishing their work; inefficient methods, outdated techniques and bureaucratic drift are challenged, if not eliminated.
- Raises an awareness of what other departments do.
- Routine scheduling is enhanced with the ability to move staff about the "Operation".
- Better coverage, increased flexibility and ability to cope with unexpected absences, emergencies, illness, etc.
- Can increase the "employability" of staff who have the opportunity to train in areas they were not originally hired for.

Other advantages include:

- Increased flexibility and versatility,
- Appreciated intellectual capital
- Improved individual efficiency,
- Increased standardization of jobs,
- Heightened morale.

== See also ==
- Cellular manufacturing
- Interdisciplinarity
- Just-in-time manufacturing
- Bus factor
