= Flexicurity =

Welfare-state model with a pro-active labour market policy

Flexicurity (a portmanteau of "flexibility" and "security") is a welfare state model with a pro-active labour market policy. The term was coined by the social democratic prime minister of Denmark Poul Nyrup Rasmussen in the 1990s.

The term refers to the combination of labour market flexibility in a dynamic economy and security for workers.

The Government of Denmark views flexicurity as entailing a "golden triangle" with a "three-sided mix of (1) flexibility in the labour market combined with (2) social security and (3) an active labour market policy with rights and obligations for the unemployed".

The European Commission considers flexicurity as an integrated strategy to simultaneously enhance flexibility and security in the labour market. Flexicurity is designed and implemented across four policy components: 1) flexible and reliable contractual arrangements; 2) comprehensive lifelong learning strategies; 3) effective active labour market policies; and 4) modern social security systems providing adequate income support during employment transitions.

It is important to recognize that the flexicurity concept has been developed in countries with high wages, besides clear progressive taxation, as in for example, Denmark.

== History ==
=== In Denmark ===
The Danish flexicurity model has its roots in the nineteenth century, when negotiations among employers and trade unions during the so-called September Compromise of 1899 (also called Labour Market Constitution) laid the ground for a mutually beneficial (profitable and secure) state. The 'Constitution' was revised in 1960 and renamed Basic Agreement. It settled the freedom of trade union association as well as the managerial prerogative to manage and divide the work including the right to hire and dismiss the labour force at any time necessary. "It is thus important to understand that the Danish model of labour market regulation, including the right to form associations, is based on these voluntaristic principles and that legislation or interference of the state is kept on a minimum. The right of association and the recognition of labour market associations are based on the mutual recognition of conflicting interests." The Danish tripartite agreements amongst employers, workers, and the state are supported by an intricate system that allows for an active response from the state, which supports the 'activation' of workers.

In the early 1990s, Danish policymakers established a fiscal policy aimed at breaking the unemployment trend of the time and was further coupled to the first active labour market policy (ALMP) of 1994 which sought to reduce structural unemployment. Although some believed that the natural unemployment rate had simply increased, the Danish government sought to improve the situation by implementing what came to be called the flexicurity model. The policy shift thus came about with the 1994 and 1996 labour market reforms, when the introduction of flexibility was linked to security through the continued provision of generous welfare schemes as well as the 'activation' of the labour force through a set of ALMPs. Activation in Denmark is regarded as "a right and an obligation". The effects expected from this combination were twofold: qualification effects of the labour market policies (LMPs) as well as motivational effects through the welfare schemes.

The unemployment benefits and training provision that this system entail place a higher burden of taxation upon the higher-earning members of the Danish society. Denmark currently has high taxation rates which in part pay for generous social benefits. Flexicurity may thus favour low- to middle-income earners. However, this might partially be offset by Denmark's high-output growth which is coupled to low unemployment figures (2.8% in 2008) and similarly low social-exclusion rates. In recent years, Danes have been consistently ranked as the happiest nation on Earth, which has in part been attributed to aspects of Denmark's flexicurity model.

=== In Netherlands ===
The Netherlands has also implemented flexicurity policies that are well-suited to the country's market. In 1998, significant changes were made to the country's labor laws with the aim of proactively supporting the workforce with benefits for sickness and workplace hazards. The purpose of the law was to provide support for employees who were absent due to illness, with the cost being borne by the employer. This created a financial burden for employers in the long run. However, the flexicurity law allowed them to hire temporary workers with flexible contracts, which resulted in direct cost savings. Although the use of temporary workers is more flexible and cost-effective in the short term, permanent labor with flexicurity measures is more beneficial for the economy in the long term. As a result, companies are now investing more in converting temporary workers into eligible and secure employees. Despite the Netherlands having low unemployment rates, the flexicurity laws have resulted in an unequal balance between security and flexibility.

=== In the European employment strategy ===
In the European Commission's approach, flexicurity is about striking the right balance between flexible job arrangements and secure transitions between jobs, so that more and better jobs can be created. The idea is that flexibility and security should not be seen as opposites but as complementary. Flexibility is about developing flexible work organisations where people can combine their work and private responsibilities; where they can keep their training up-to-date; and where they can potentially have flexible working hours. It is also about giving both employers and employees a more flexible environment for changing jobs. Security means 'employment security' – to provide people with the training they need to keep their skills up-to-date and to develop their talent as well as providing them with adequate unemployment benefits if they were to lose their job for a period of time.

Flexicurity is also seen as a way to preserve the European social model while maintaining and improving the competitiveness of the European Union. It is argued that, in the context of globalisation and technological change which place greater demands on business to adapt continuously, high levels of employment security will not depend only on protection of workers' specific job, but mainly on the means for workers to stay on the job market, manage smooth transitions between jobs, and make progress in their careers.

Furthermore, flexicurity is seen as a strategy to make labour markets significantly more inclusive in some of the European countries, by tackling labour market segmentation between insiders (workers well-established in stable, quality jobs) and outsiders (unemployed persons or in precarious employment who do not benefit from other advantages linked to a permanent contract, frequently youth, migrants, etc.). The relevance of flexicurity to tackle modern labour market challenges has also been recognised by the representatives of social partners at a transnational European level, by European Trade Union Confederation and BusinessEurope.

Flexicurity has therefore been adopted as a leitmotiv of the European employment strategy and the revised Lisbon Strategy for Growth and Jobs. In particular, the Guideline No.21 of the Integrated Guidelines for Growth and Employment (adopted by the European Council and setting the objectives for the periods 2005-2008 and 2008–2010) calls on Member States to "…promote flexibility combined with employment security and reduce labour market segmentation, having due regard to the role of the social partners".

A key Communication from the European Commission "Towards Common Principles of Flexicurity: More and better jobs through flexibility and security" was published in June 2007 defines flexicurity as an 'integrated approach' based on four interacting components.

Recognising the principle of a "no size fits for all" the European Commissions advocated for a progressive implementation of national, tailor-made, flexicurity strategies in all EU Member States supported by mutual learning, along the lines of commonly agreed principles. Such common principles were adopted on 5 December 2007 by the Employment and Social Affairs Council.

At the council's request, the European Commission has launched the "Mission for flexicurity", consisting of representatives of the French Presidency and the preceding Slovenian Presidency of the European Union and of the European social partners. The Mission took place between April and July 2008 in France, Sweden, Finland, Poland, and Spain, seeking to promote the implementation of flexicurity in different national contexts by raising the profile of the flexicurity approach and its common principles and by helping the relevant labour market actors to take ownership of the process. The Mission also had the objective of promoting the exchange of good practice and mutual learning between Member States. It reported to the Council in December 2008.

Flexicurity featured prominently in the commission's response to the crisis, in the European Economic Recovery Plan of November 2008 and its follow up Communication "Driving economic recovery" of March 2009.

Most recently, the European Council of June 2009 concluded that "in the current situation [of crisis], 'flexicurity' is an important means by which to modernise and foster the adaptability of labour markets."

== Current state ==
Upon the adoption of the common principles of flexicurity, the Council called on the Member States to take them into account in drawing up and implementing "national flexicurity pathways". Progress in the implementation of flexicurity strategies is reported by Member States in their National Reform Programmes and is monitored by the European Commission in the framework of the European Employment Strategy.

The 2011 Euro Plus Pact calls for its promotion in the Eurozone.

The Common Principles of Flexicurity
(1) Flexicurity is a means to reinforce the implementation of the Lisbon Strategy, create more and better jobs, modernise labour markets, and promote good work through new forms of flexibility and security to increase adaptability, employment and social cohesion.

(2) Flexicurity involves the deliberate combination of flexible and reliable contractual arrangements, comprehensive lifelong learning strategies, effective active labour market policies, and modern, adequate and sustainable social protection systems.

(3) Flexicurity approaches are not about one single labour market or working life model, nor about a single policy strategy: they should be tailored to the specific circumstances of each Member State. Flexicurity implies a balance between rights and responsibilities of all concerned. Based on the common principles, each Member State should develop its own flexicurity arrangements. Progress should be effectively monitored.

(4) Flexicurity should promote more open, responsive and inclusive labour markets overcoming segmentation. It concerns both those in work and those out of work. The inactive, the unemployed, those in undeclared work, in unstable employment, or at the margins of the labour market need to be provided with better opportunities, economic incentives and supportive measures for easier access to work or stepping-stones to assist progress into stable and legally secure employment. Support should be available to all those in employment to remain employable, progress and manage transitions both in work and between jobs.

(5) Internal (within the enterprise) as well as external flexicurity are equally important and should be promoted. Sufficient contractual flexibility must be accompanied by secure transitions from job to job. Upward mobility needs to be facilitated, as well as between unemployment or inactivity and work. High-quality and productive workplaces, good organisation of work, and continuous upgrading of skills are also essential. Social protection should provide incentives and support for job transitions and for access to new employment.

(6) Flexicurity should support gender equality, by promoting equal access to quality employment for women and men and offering measures to reconcile work, family and private life.

(7) Flexicurity requires a climate of trust and broadly-based dialogue among all stakeholders, where all are prepared to take the responsibility for change with a view to socially balanced policies. While public authorities retain an overall responsibility, the involvement of social partners in the design and implementation of flexicurity policies through social dialogue and collective bargaining is of crucial importance.

(8) Flexicurity requires a cost-effective allocation of resources and should remain fully compatible with sound and financially sustainable public budgets. It should also aim at a fair distribution of costs and benefits, especially between businesses, public authorities and individuals, with particular attention to the specific situation of SMEs.

== Criticism ==
Flexicurity has been criticized as "a purely linguistic combination of opposites that can be applied to virtually any policy mix."

== See also ==
- Decent work
- European labour law
- Job security
- Labour market flexibility
- Nordic model
- Precarious work
