= Social welfare model =

Form of social welfare

A social welfare model is a system of social welfare provision and its accompanying value system. It usually involves social policies that affect the welfare of a country's citizens within the framework of a market or mixed economy.

== Elements of a social welfare model ==
=== Taxation ===
Taxation is concerned with how the state taxes the people, whether by a flat tax, regressive tax or a progressive tax system. The most common guiding rule of taxation is to levy taxes by the ability to pay.

=== Social insurance ===
Social insurance is concerned with how the state implements benefits for the unemployed, pensions, maternity and paternity leave and disabilities.

=== Public services ===
Services such as health care can be almost entirely state funded, private insurance-based, or somewhere in-between. For example, the United Kingdom has an almost entirely publicly funded health service, the National Health Service (NHS), and Canada offers public health care offered at a provincial level. Conversely, in the United States, individuals have to rely on health insurance policies in the event of hospitalization, and a minimal amount of state support for the poorer people exists. Another element can be public transport, as some countries have nationalized rapid transit systems, while others have privatized them (in the UK for example, public transport has been privatised in Great Britain but not in Northern Ireland).

=== Employment ===
Economies with a more laissez-faire approach to employment will do nothing to provide job security. Other countries will rely on some degree of regulation to protect workers from arbitrary firings. A high degree of regulation such as expensive severance fees is often cited reason for making employers reluctant to hire and causing unemployment.

== Examples ==
=== European welfare models ===
==== British Model ====
Used by the UK, Canada, Australia, New Zealand, South Africa, Ireland, Hong Kong, Singapore and the South Asian countries the British model tends to have a welfare state of roughly average size, relative to high-income OECD countries, but less comprehensive than those in Scandinavia and much of continental Europe. They have somewhat more poverty and higher inequality. Despite having a smaller welfare state than most Western European countries, the UK, Canada, Australia and New Zealand do provide, among other things, universal single payer health care, redistribute income and guarantee an income at subsistence level.

==== Continental European ====
Used by Austria, France, Germany, Belgium and Luxembourg, the Continental model has strict rules on job protection and a large amount of regulation in industry. However, the labour market has proven to be inflexible and slow to react to globalisation. Generous insurance-based unemployment benefits and a well funded welfare state are used to reduce poverty and provide high quality health care. This model can generally be seen as middle ground between the British and Nordic models.

==== Mediterranean ====
Used by Italy, Spain, Greece, Portugal, Turkey, Cyprus and Malta. the Mediterranean model is similar to the Continental model, but focuses welfare on generous state-pensions. The labour market is inflexible with the same job protectionism as in the Continental model, but is not good at reducing poverty within the lower end of society.

==== The Nordic Model ====
The Nordic Model, mainly refers to Nordic countries Norway, Sweden, Denmark, Iceland, Finland but some include the Netherlands, also called 'Nordic corporatist' model because of strong influence of the corporatist elements such as Trade unions and employers' organisations, advocates a highly developed and government-funded welfare state which provides generous unemployment benefits among other resources for the general public.

Labour markets are kept mobile with easy firing and hiring, and government taking care of those laid off with unemployment benefits and retraining. The equality of the Nordic model is achieved through progressive taxation. As a result of the policy, Sweden, Denmark and Norway have the lowest income disparities in the world. Nordic countries have been enjoying high economic and productivity growth, but most remarkably they consistently conquer top spots in world happiness surveys.

The welfare systems within the Nordic Model also emerge as highly-rated in many standard international comparisons of welfare or well-being. However, as a limited critique, some Nordic-based welfare and gender researchers have argued that such assessments, based on conventional welfare/well-being criteria, may to some extent over-privilege the Nordic countries in terms of, for instance, gender and racial equality.

For example, they suggest that if one takes a broader perspective on well-being incorporating issues associated with bodily integrity or bodily citizenship (Pringle 2011), then some major forms of men’s domination and/or white privilege can be seen to still stubbornly persist in the Nordic countries, e.g. business, violence to women, sexual violence to children, the military, academia and religion (Hearn and Pringle 2006; Hearn et al. 2018; Pringle 2016)

==== American Model ====
Before the Great Depression, the United States adhered to a social model that could be summarized by the term "rugged individualism": the understanding that because most people are capable of taking care of themselves, each person should be left to succeed or fail on their own, only fettered by the bounds of the law, and the government should be limited to protection of civil liberties. The United States had very little in the way of a social safety net for its citizens, with most people depending on their families and private social organizations if they were unable to provide for themselves; this partially explains the enduring greater emphasis on family and religion in American society and politics today than in other comparably developed countries in Western Europe.

As a result of increased modernization in the late 19th century, this view changed in the emergence of the Progressive Movement, which held that the government can and should have a greater role in regulating the economy, so as to promote a better life for all of its citizens. The biggest change came with President Franklin Delano Roosevelt's New Deal, during which time the American government intervened extensively in the economy, guided often by Keynesian economics. New programs included relief for the poor, unemployed, and those who cannot work due to youth, old age, or disability.

However, since the Great Depression, the United States has not followed other developed democracies in the establishment of a more comprehensive model for assuring its citizens' well being. One possible explanation for this is that the U.S was not affected in the same way by World War II as Europe was: while Europeans relied on strong centralized governments to help rebuild their economies after two world wars, the United States was enjoying a period of unprecedented economic growth due to its being one of the few industrialized countries on the planet whose productive capacity had not been destroyed by enemy nations. But now, with the rise of industrial and geo-political competition in Europe and Asia, growing income inequality, high energy prices, and mounting public debt, there is renewed debate over the role of government in modern society.

For more comprehensive information, see Social programs in the United States

== See also ==
- European social model
- Social policy
- Social structure
- Social welfare
- Socioeconomics
- Sociotechnical systems theory
- Welfare capitalism
