= Key person insurance =

Business life insurance policy on key personnel

Key person insurance, also called keyman insurance, is an important form of business insurance. There is no legal definition of "key person insurance". In general, it is an insurance policy taken out by a business to compensate that business for financial losses that would arise from the death or extended incapacity of an important member of the business. To put it simply, key person insurance is a standard life insurance or trauma insurance policy that is used for business succession or business protection purposes. The policy's term does not extend beyond the period of the key person's usefulness to the business. Key person policies are usually owned by the business and the aim is to compensate the business for losses incurred with the loss of a key income generator and facilitate business continuity. Key person insurance does not indemnify the actual losses incurred but compensates with a fixed monetary sum as specified in the insurance policy.

Many businesses have a key person who is responsible for the majority of profits or has a unique and hard to replace skill set that is vital to the organisation. An employer may take out a key person insurance policy on the life or health of any employee whose knowledge, work, or overall contribution is considered uniquely valuable to the company. The employer does this to offset the costs (such as hiring temporary help or recruiting a successor) and losses (such as a decreased ability to transact business until successors are trained) which the employer is likely to suffer in the event of the loss of a key person.

== Insurable losses ==
There are four categories of loss for which key person insurance can provide compensation:

1. Losses related to the extended period when a key person is unable to work, to provide temporary personnel and, if necessary, to finance the recruitment and training of a replacement.
2. Insurance to protect profits. For example, offsetting lost income from lost sales, losses resulting from the delay or cancellation of any business project that the key person was involved in, loss of opportunity to expand, loss of specialised skills or knowledge.
3. Insurance to protect shareholders or partnership interests. Typically this is insurance to enable shareholdings or partnership interests to be purchased by existing shareholders or partners.
4. Insurance for anyone involved in guaranteeing business loans or banking facilities. The value of insurance coverage is arranged to equal the value of the guarantee.

== Key person definition ==
Key people are individuals whose skills, knowledge, experience or leadership are important to a business's continued financial success. Should something happen to one of these individuals it is likely that their loss will have a detrimental impact on the profitability of the business and will cause financial strain. Examples of a key individual include, but are not limited to: company directors, sales directors, IT specialist, managing directors and heads of product development.

== Worth attribution ==
Deciding on the sum of money to ensure the key person is dependent on the company and the reason for insuring that individual. It can be to cover a loan or investment amount, or it can be dependent on working out the worth of the person to the company. It is recommended that you think about potential loss of profits, the cost of replacement and any debts that would need to be covered to keep the company running without that person.

Loss of profits can be caused as a result of the loss of company reputation, the loss of clients or a decline in sales. For example, if a key sales manager had built up a relationship with key clients, they may no longer want to work with the business if that key person were no longer around. This can cause them to go elsewhere and cause a dip in sales figures. In addition to this, the cost of training, recruitment and temporary cover to find a replacement can be high. This also needs to be factored into the amount of cover that is taken out. The company would need to consider how they would be impacted as a result of a loss of a key person in different ways to determine how much that individual is worth.

== Policy ownership ==
Key person insurance policies can be owned in a number of ways depending on the needs of the business. It is common for a business to own the policy with claim proceeds being paid directly to the business. There is no legislative or insurable requirement for a policy to be owned by a specific party or entity and there may be circumstances be it for taxation or policy continuation purposes where policies may be owned and paid for by the insured person directly or owned by another individual.

== Advantages ==
1. In case of death of a key person the company is paid money to cope with the loss.
2. In the US, any business concern buying key person insurance for its employee can claim a deduction for the premium paid for the policy as a business expense under Section 37(1) of the Income Tax Act. Tax deductions may also apply in other countries.
3. This policy can be used as either an extra superannuation benefit or an ex gratia payment to the key employee during the service period. If the company receives the proceeds on maturity, then they may be taxable. (With recent changes in rules, only a term plan is available under key person insurance. Hence, there will not be any maturity benefit.)
4. There is no need to give advance notice to the income tax authorities.
5. The company can also raise loans on the policy from LIC. (On a term plan, no loan is available.)
6. For executives earning high salaries, this policy can be given as a hike in salary and saves income tax.
7. It becomes a great help to the business for their tax planning.
8. The directors can also safeguard their immediate family from being affected by the vagaries of the industry and the various business cycles that the business has to encounter.
9. A key person insurance policy helps to improve the retention of key personnel of the business.

== Disadvantages ==
1. The amount on claim or maturity under a key person insurance policy is not exempt under Section 10 (10D) of the Income Tax Act if the company is paying the premiums unless the policy is assigned to the key person who himself/herself pays the premium.
2. If the policy is surrendered then the amount endorsed is taxable in the hands of the key person as profit in lieu of salary.

== Taxation ==
The tax treatment for premiums paid for key person insurance and the treatment of monies received from a claim vary among countries.

Premiums are generally not tax deductible in the U.S. Under the COLI Best Practices Act within the Pension Protection Act of 2006, key person insurance proceeds for policies owned by employers can be taxable if certain conditions are not met.

In Australia, key person insurance policies are generally not deductible unless used specifically for business revenue protection purposes. Claim proceeds in Australia if used for revenue purposes may be taxable and, depending on the ownership of the policy, may trigger a capital gains taxation event.

In the UK the main principles of key person insurance taxation were outlined by the Chancellor of the Exchequer in 1944, Sir John Anderson. The "Andersen Rules" state:

Treatment for taxation purposes would depend upon the facts of the particular case and it rests with the assessing authorities and the Commissioners on appeal, if necessary, to determine the liability by reference to these facts. I am, however, advised that the general practice in dealing with insurances on the lives of employees is to treat the premiums as admissible deductions, and any sums received under a policy as trading receipts, if (i) the sole relationship is that of employer and employee; (ii) the insurance is intended to meet loss of profit resulting from the loss of services of the employee; and (iii) it is an annual or short-term insurance. Cases of premiums paid by companies to insure the lives of Directors are dealt with on similar lines.

His Majesty's Revenue and Customs has taken the view that key person insurance is tax-efficient if it is taken out "solely for the purposes of the business". Specifically, if the company takes out a key person insurance policy to protect the business from any loss of profits that have stemmed from the loss of the employee, then the premiums are not taxable. If a key employee has a substantial number of shares, then the key person insurance could potentially be seen as being taken out for their own interests, instead of those of the business. This is particularly the case if critical illness cover is added to the policy. Essentially, key person insurance can be tax-efficient, but it is always best to check with a financial advisor or the local tax office before making assumptions.

== See also ==
- Bus factor
