= Institutional memory =

Collective set of facts, concepts, experiences and knowledge held by a group of people

Institutional memory is a collective set of facts, concepts, experiences and knowledge held by a group of people.

== Concept ==
Institutional memory has been defined as "the stored knowledge within the organization." Within any organization, tools and techniques will need to be adapted to meet that organization's needs. These adaptations are developed over time and taught to new members of the group, keeping them from encountering the same problems and having to develop a solution that already exists. In this way, organizations save time and resources that might otherwise be wasted.

For example, two automobile repair shops might have the same model of car lift. The lifts themselves and the written instructions for them are identical. However, if one shop has a lower ceiling than the other, its employees may determine that raising a car beyond a certain height can cause it to be damaged by the ceiling. The current employees inform new employees of this workaround. They, in turn, inform future new employees, even if the person who originally discovered the problem no longer works there. Such information is in the repair shop's institutional memory.

Institutional memory requires the ongoing transmission of memories between members of the group. As such, it relies on a continuity of group membership. If everyone at the aforementioned auto shop quit at once, the employees hired to replace them would not be able to benefit from the previous group's experience. In such a case, the organization would have lost its institutional memory and operate less efficiently until the workarounds that composed it could be developed again.

Elements of institutional memory may be found in corporations, professional groups, government bodies, religious groups, academic collaborations, and by extension in entire cultures. There are different ideas about how institutional memory is transferred, whether it is between people or through written sources.

Institutional memory may be encouraged to preserve an ideology or way of work in such a group. Conversely, institutional memory may be ingrained to the point that it becomes hard to challenge, even the conditions that caused it to arise have changed. An example of this would be an organization continuing to submit a form, even after the law requiring that document has been repealed, for fear of legal consequences that no longer exist. Institutional memory may also have influence on organizational identity, choice of individuals, and actions of the individuals interacting with the institution.

== Institutional knowledge ==
Institutional knowledge is gained by organizations translating historical data into useful knowledge and wisdom. Memory depends upon the preservation of data and also the analytical skills necessary for its effective use within the organization.

Religion is one of the significant institutional forces acting on the collective memory attributed to humanity. Alternatively, the evolution of ideas in Marxist theory is that the mechanism whereby knowledge and wisdom are passed down through the generations is subject to economic determinism. In all instances, social systems, cultures, and organizations have an interest in controlling and using institutional memories.

== See also ==
- Bus factor – Concept in risk management
- Collective memory – Shared knowledge and values of a social group
- Organizational culture, also known as Corporate culture – Customary behaviours in an organization
- Information Awareness Office – DARPA division overseeing the "Total Information Awareness" program
- Internet Archive – American non-profit digital archive
- Memory hole – Fictional device in Nineteen Eighty-Four
- Organizational memory – Data and information held by an organization
- Tribal knowledge – Information or knowledge that is known within a tribe but often unknown outside of it
