= Managerial prerogative =

Managerial prerogatives, also described as the functions and rights of management, represent the scope of business managers' unilateral authority to conduct their business, unhindered by interference by employees, trade unions or the law. In the context of trade unions, a reference to managerial prerogatives may be used to describe unilateral management power. When used by management, it generally references an exclusive right and control right without interference.

== Managerial prerogative content ==
Managerial prerogative is that employers and managers can freely supervise according to their own judgments. Its effective exercise includes recruitment, employment, job distribution, job supervision, working methods, working hours, employee rules and regulations, employee supervision, employee transfer, employee sanctions, layoffs, employee dismissals, employee recalls, and other employment matters. Its limitation lies in the policies, rules and regulations of different countries so that managerial prerogative must be fair and reasonable.

== Manager's right to manage ==
The rights of managers include abiding by professional ethics, complying with company regulations and industry laws, communicating organizational values, setting goals, implementing strategies, and conducting risk management. For employees, managers have the right to manage recruitment, performance evaluation, task allocation, punishment, dismissal. Managers are also responsible for providing a safe and healthy workplace for employees, actively communicating with employees, ensuring that employees are treated fairly, and providing training and professional development opportunities for employees.

== Management views on prerogative ==
The two streams of argument from management relate the primacy of market rationality. They are:

1. Property rights, in that the rights that management has had over their capital assets incurs this level of control and;
2. Economic efficiency, the argument that it is better to let management manage as they see fit for the benefit of all stakeholders.

Both views center on the idea that more efficient work will occur if managers are allowed to use their prerogatives.

== Trade union views on prerogative ==
Many workers and their representatives do acknowledge part of management's role to manage. They often do not describe it as a right of management, but as part of the job managers are paid to do. Management use this term to defend their role, but also trade unions use this time to place an element of responsibility upon management. The function of trade unions is to place limits on managerial prerogatives. Trade unions protect employees by referring to their worker's rights as well as their human rights. Without trade unions, managers have full power to practice their rights. Recent laws are imposing rules that employers have to use their prerogatives with good faith.

== Practice of managerial prerogatives in different countries ==
=== Australia ===
In Australia, the industrial relations policies of the Howard government during its initial terms increased the exercise of managerial prerogative by reducing the scope and importance of awards, encouraging decentralized enterprise bargaining, and reducing the power of unions and promoting individual contracts.

=== United Kingdom ===
In the UK, there are constraints on managerial prerogative rights mainly pertaining to the right of firing employees. In order to successfully dismiss a worker, the manager must provide sufficient evidence that his decision to fire was fair to all parties. This is judged in a court of law.

==== Johnstone v Bloomsbury: Health Authority ====
Johnstone v Bloomsbury: Health Authority is an example of managerial prerogatives used in an abusive manner. Dr. Johnstone had been asked to work for a set time per week and also be ready when asked to work for additional hours. This was abused when his manager asked him to work inhumane hours, affecting Johnstone's health and well-being. His manager was able to impose these hours on Dr. Johnstone but there are human rights in the UK that protect Johnstone and his health.

=== Finland ===
In Finland, there is a clear reciprocation of trust between employers and employees. The employees are expected to show a certain level of subordination to the employer as well as respect secondary duties such as following instructions given to them by employers. Loyalty is also seen as an essential part of most businesses in Finland, and it is seen as a secondary duty as well.

=== Malaysia ===
In Malaysia, employers have the right to terminate employment under three circumstances. First, the employer has or intends to reduce or discontinue the business of the company in which the employee is employed; second, the employer has or intends to eliminate the business in the area in which the employee is employed; third, The employer has or intends to reduce or discontinue the business requirements in which the employee is engaged. In addition to the above three cases, the employer itself has the inherent right to restructure the enterprise, and no arbitration court will intervene unless the reorganization is proved to be conducted in bad faith or without reason.

== Unfair dismissal and managerial prerogative ==
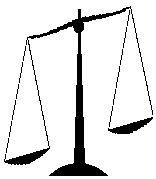

Unfair dismissal occurs when employers or managers use their prerogatives to fire employees for reasons specified by them, and these reasons are improper or insufficient to justify the dismissal. Managerial prerogatives give employers and managers the right to dismiss employees. The Unfair Dismissal Law gives employees the right to protect themselves and to claim compensation if they are unfairly dismissed. The specific prerogatives and laws vary according to the national conditions and relevant regulations of each country.

== See also ==
- Manager's right to manage
- Plenipotentiary
- General Manager
- Management
- Johnstone v Bloomsbury Health Authority
