= Shift-based hiring =

Shift-based hiring is a recruitment concept pioneered in Singapore that hires people for individual shifts, rather than hiring employees before scheduling them into shifts. Originally, it was intended as an efficient way to schedule shift-based part-time work, but it is now known that this concept can be applied to any job that requires many consecutive hours of commitment as a shift. This hiring concept focuses on employing workers for a particular shift on that particular day, rather than focusing on employing a worker to work recurrent shifts that can become part-time or full-time work, although the latter can be a result of employing a worker to work shifts that run at the same timing periodically. Every shift or a group of recurring shifts may be a unique job posting.

It is also to be juxtaposed with a zero-hour contract, as employees are not bound by the contract to be on standby every day or to work whenever the employer needs additional labour. The employee adopts a proactive role in the sense that they, after viewing all the vacant shifts, offers their service for the shifts they are willing to work for, as compared to the employer offering the employee a shift that they might not want. The bargaining power does not lie solely with the employer, since employers hire employees for one or more shifts. The employer has the flexibility to scale up or down its labour demand, while employees have the flexibility to choose the shifts they want to work.

== Feasibility ==
Employing workers on a shift basis is administratively complex for a manager. Finding workers for individual shifts means posting job advertisements in classified advertisements or on online employment websites. Cloud-based management programmes are used to streamline and combine these individual shift-hiring requirements into a schedule or calendar. These work in a similar format to other cloud-based talent management marketplaces. An online marketplace is created for employees and employers to meet, apply for jobs, and recruit in real time in a cloud-based environment. It provides real-time updates and management to both the employees and the employers, such that the employees will know at first instance when the work schedule is confirmed. Employers can respond to any new employee applications immediately. Furthermore, any changes to employees' schedules and commitments are transmitted in real time to the employer, so that contingency measures can be taken as soon as possible, if needed.

== Scheduling ==
With workers elected and hired only for specific shifts, scheduling them is a by-product of the hiring process, and there is no need for the extra step of matching each worker's schedule to the business's operational needs.

A platform that allows the manager to monitor each shift's staffing level is usually required. In contrast to automated scheduling software that relies on algorithms to optimise service hours and minimise staffing costs, a shift-based hiring approach delegates responsibility for filling the duty roster and ensuring appropriate staffing levels back to managers and the workforce. Rather than relying on an algorithm to assign shifts which has been shown to place a high human-factors cost on the team worker, shift-based hiring leverages on its cloud-based nature and crowd-sourcing ideas to ensure that the staffing level needs are transparently communicated to managers and the team in real-time. Managers can assign or have workers bid for their shifts dynamically to meet staffing needs.

=== Example ===
John is finding work at a food-and-beverage outlet. However, he has a very busy, non-recurring schedule. A particular 2-week forecast could probably only allow him to work these hours:

Week 1 Monday: 4 pm – 7 pm
Week 1 Thursday: 7 pm – 11 pm
Week 1 Saturday:1 pmm 4 pmpm

Week 2 Tuesda7 pm7p11 pm11pm
Week 2 Friday: 9 am –1 pmm
Week 2 Sunday: 4 pm – 7 pm

Such an erratic schedule might deter a conventional employer because of the administrative complexity of coordinating everyone's schedules to manage business operations. Yet if a company is hiring based on individual shifts, it can employ John to work all 6 days he is free. This is with consideration of the manager's primary hiring philosophy: to fill individual shifts rather than to find employees who can work as many shifts as possible.

== Application to the service sector ==
As economies move up the economic ladder and tertiary sectors such as the service sector grow, the standard 9–5 jobs prevalent in manufacturing industries are becoming less prevalent as a proportion of the economy. Service sectors often cater to the free time of these workers, which are their break times and after work periods. The working hours of service sectors cannot fit into the 9-to-5 job timings, and thus businesses instead maximise their operations in certain periods of a day. There is a demand for more labour during peak periods and less during non-peak periods. The diversification of work hours to maximise business profitability exemplifies the applicability of shift-based hiring in such sectors.

As the idea of work-life balance starts to gain traction in society, people start to fit their jobs into their schedules instead of fitting their schedules into their work. Work is less seen as the centre point of one's life, where other priorities revolve around one's job. This calls for more flexible arrangements demanded in societies.

== Difference with current recruitment avenues ==
This is contrasted against the current recruitment concepts in a way that the shift-based hiring is not for a particular position required for part-time or full-time work, but it is just recruiting for that particular shift on that particular day. Every shift on each day can be seen as a unique job posting.

== Advantages ==
=== Advantages to employers ===
- Scalable hiring based on needs - Hiring by shifts allows managers to expand or reduce the workforce recruited on a needs basis. There can also be different pay incentives for different shifts on different days to optimise business costs and operational efficiency. A manager who forecasts a spike in sales on a day in the following week can increase the number of workers to hire for that shift, or adjust the wage for that shift alone to attract more labour.
- "Try-before-you-buy" - In economics, potential employees send signals to the employers through their resume and interviews in an attempt to impress upon the interviewer to land the job. Shift based hiring allows employers to further "test the waters" on the workers' suitability for the job by only committing to hiring the employee for one single shift, allowing employers to better select suitable employees to work for the company, before accepting these employees for more shifts.
- Conflicts of interest are minimized - With the manager scheduling workers into the shifts required of the business, unhappiness arises when the manager does not meet all the needs of the workers in their work schedule. Using programs that automatically schedule workers into their shifts purely based on business needs has been shown to exacerbate the situation by failing to engage with workers to hear out and address their needs. With shift-based hiring, the responsibility is back in the hands of the managers to engage their workers.
- Higher Job Satisfaction and Productivity - With the flexibility in work hours with shift-based hiring, job satisfaction has been argued to potentially increase as it is seen as a way of engaging employees positively. This also leads to other positive impacts such as higher job productivity, and can reduce the number of no-shows and shirking occurrences.

=== Advantages to employees ===
- Flexibility - Employees can tailor their work schedule to their own needs, finding jobs that can cater to their other commitments. They have the option to increase their work hours or even take new jobs without sacrificing the chance to return to their current company.
- "Try-before-you-buy" - Similarly for the employees, shift-based hiring allows them to gain a deeper understanding of what working in the business is like by committing to a shift. They can then make a more informed decision about whether to continue working additional shifts on a longer-term basis with the company.
- Influence in own Work Schedule - Shift-based hiring brings the decision-making power of employees back to themselves. Using scheduling software that relies on algorithms has resulted in shift schedules that do not provide enough rest for some workers, who sometimes "clopen" (a term used to refer to an employee having to close the shop on the first day and open it on the second day). While some of these employees were reported actually to want to work "clopenings", these scheduling software often do not address the needs of those employees who do not want to. Shift-based hiring allows employees to decide when they want to work.

== Limitations ==
=== Cost of on-the-job training ===
On-the-job training is required for most jobs, and its cost might be too high for companies, given the risk that some employees might quit after only one shift. That might deter companies from embarking on a shift-based hiring scheme after weighing their own costs and benefits.

=== Industries with inelastic supply / inflexible production period / long production period ===
Human resources is only one of the inputs in business production. Although the workforce can be scaled in the short run, other factors, such as raw materials, long production periods, and time lags in responding to changes in demand, can render the benefits of shift-based hiring ineffective.

=== Job nature dependent ===
Shift-based hiring will be better suited to industries and transactional job natures. These often entail duties that can be done in a short period of time or within the shift for which they are applied. Examples include (but are not limited to): service and kitchen crews in the food and business industry, sales crews in the retail industry, logistics and support crews in logistics companies, etc. Recruiting people for a role that requires commitment over a few days or on a project basis will not be feasible via shift-based hiring, for the whole idea of recruitment is only for the shift on that particular day.

== Emerging demand for flexible shift scheduling and hiring ==
As work-life integration becomes an increasingly common choice for many workers, employees seek greater flexibility in choosing their shift times. It has been argued that employers' inability to introduce flexibility in shift timings is a potential pain point for employees who must balance non-work commitments with their work commitments. It might also become a source of conflict for employees with heavy family responsibilities, such as those of a caregiver. Incremental benefits can be reaped by allowing workers to work shifts based on their family needs or natural work rhythms, which can increase job satisfaction and productivity through greater employee engagement.
