= Corporate history =

A corporate history is a historical account of a business or other co-operative organization. Usually it is produced in written format but it can also be published as audio or audiovisually. Thousands of companies across the industrialized world have recorded their histories, albeit in their own unique ways – from relatively benign, albeit colorful chronicles, usually written for the private archives of founding families, to titles with well-defined corporate applications. Corporate histories in the United States have been particularly prolific, those in the UK less so.

== History ==
In the late 19th century, corporate histories were initially written by Victorian era businessmen, either the founder of a company himself, members of the surviving family owners or long-serving employees. Rather than being sequential histories, as is now done, many of them were diary-type personal recollections or short, superficial public relations exercises. One of the earliest corporate histories, that of a publishing company in the UK called the Catnach Press, was done in 1886. A notable early US corporate history, published in 1902, was that of Standard Oil.

Academic involvement probably started in 1924 when George Unwin and co-author George Taylor published a detailed history, Samuel Oldknow and the Arkwrights: The Industrial Revolution at Stockport and Marple. It was published by the Manchester University Press.

Between the World Wars, the majority of business histories, and especially in the UK, were house histories, consisting mainly of reminiscences and anecdotes. Only a tiny handful of serious work existed using business records which had found their way into museums, county record offices or the private possession of collectors. Corporate histories were typically unplanned. Relevant records were often discovered by chance and deemed interesting enough to turn into historical narratives which were funded either by the family descendants of the long-dead businessmen in question or, less frequently, the author in association with a publisher. They had one thing in common - they were generally records of companies that had died or otherwise dropped out of sight. One exception occurred In 1938, when the Bank of England commissioned a two-volume 250-year anniversary history. Written by J. H. Clapham, professor of economic history at Cambridge, it took six years to produce. It was a deliberately celebratory vehicle for this famous British institution.

Modern corporate history took a large conceptual step in 1947 when the then chairman of Unilever, Geoffrey Heyworth (later Lord Heyworth) approached G. N. Clark, who had led the national campaign against the destruction of business records, for his advice on writing the history Unilever, an Anglo-Dutch manufacturing company. Clark, who had just become a professor of modern history at Oxford, suggested as author a younger colleague, Charles Wilson. The result was a classic, two-volume work that transformed the writing of business history in the UK from a public relations exercise into a reputable branch of scholarship. Wilson's work, about one of western Europe's most important companies, made him the father of modern corporate histories in the UK.

== Current practices ==
Many companies see their corporate histories as effective purveyors of long-term organizational memory and especially suitable for transmitting strategy. As such it can provide an efficient induction/educational tool for transient employees in the highly flexible labor market. Corporate historians collect and catalog materials and disseminate information for internal use. "When people think of an archives, they tend to think of the National Archives in Washington," Dave Smith, the manager of Walt Disney Co.'s multimillion-piece collection of artifacts, said in 2003. "But a lot of organizations maintain them, including businesses."

Perhaps the largest corporate archive ever assembled is that of AT&T, which began gathering historical material in 1921. As of 1999, its collection was overseen by a full-time staff of 11 people, and included 50,000 feet (15,000 m) of documents; 800,000 still photos; 12,000 various gadgets and artifacts, some of them dating back to Alexander Graham Bell; and 16,000 films and videos about AT&T.

== See also ==
- Organizational memory (OM)
- Organizational culture
