= Employment protection legislation =

Employment protection legislation (EPL) includes all types of employment protection measures, whether grounded primarily in legislation, court rulings, collectively bargained conditions of employment, or customary practice. The term is common among circles of economists. Employment protection refers both to regulations concerning hiring (e.g. rules favouring disadvantaged groups, conditions for using temporary or fixed-term contracts, training requirements) and firing (e.g. redundancy procedures, mandated prenotification periods and severance payments, special requirements for collective dismissals and short-time work schemes).

There exist various institutional arrangements that can provide employment protection: the private market, labour legislation, collective bargaining arrangements and not the least, court interpretations of legislative and contractual provisions. Some forms of de facto regulations are likely to be adopted even in the absence of legislation, simply because both workers and firms derive advantages from long-term employment relations.

== Definition ==
According to Barone (2001) with the acronym EPL economists refer to the entire set of regulations that place some limits to the faculties of firms to hire and fire workers, even if they are not grounded primarily in the law, but originate from the collective bargaining of the social partners, or are a consequence of court rulings. In particular, provisions favouring the employment of disadvantaged groups in society, determining the conditions for the use of temporary or fixed-term contracts, or imposing training requirements on the firm, affect hiring policies, while redundancy procedures, mandated pre-notification periods and severance payments, special requirements for collective dismissals and short-time work schemes influence firing decisions. The nature of these restrictions on the firms’ freedom to adjust the labour input is quite similar in all OECD countries, but the actual procedural details and the overall degree of stringency implied by them varies considerably. These provisions are enforced through the worker’s right to appeal against his lay-off.

Some aspects of these regulations, like the length of advance notices or the dimension of severance payments can be measured with precision. Other important features of EPL, like for example the willingness of labour courts to entertain appeals by fired workers, or how judges interpret the concept of “just cause” for termination, are much more difficult to quantify.

== Employment Protection Legislation Index by the OECD ==
One of the more frequently used measures of the strictness of the EPL in each country and through different years is the so-called Employment Protection Legislation Index elaborated by the OECD. This index is calculated along 18 basic items, which can be classified in three main areas:

1. Employment protection of regular workers against individual dismissal;
2. Specific requirements for collective dismissals; and
3. Regulation of temporary forms of employment.

The 18 first-digit inputs are then expressed in either of the following forms:

1. Units of time (e.g. delays before notice can start, or months of notice and severance pay);
2. As a number (e.g. maximum number of successive fixed-term contracts allowed); or
3. As a score on an ordinal scale specific to each item (0 to 2, 3, 4 or simply yes/no).

Then, these different scoring is converted into cardinal scores that are normalized to range from 0 to 6, with higher scores representing stricter regulation. Therefore, each of the different items is normalized according to weighted averages, thus constructing three sets of summary indicators that correspond to successively more aggregated measures of EPL strictness.

The last step of the procedure involves computing, for each country, an overall summary indicator based on the three subcomponents:

1. Strictness of regulation for regular contracts,
2. Temporary contracts, and
3. Collective dismissals.

The summary measure for collective dismissals is attributed just 40% of the weight assigned to regular and temporary contracts. The rationale for this is that the collective dismissals indicator only reflects additional employment protection triggered by the collective nature of the dismissal. In most countries, these additional requirements are quite modest. Moreover, summary measures for collective dismissals are only available since the late 1990s. An alternative overall index, so-called Version 1, has been thus calculated as an unweighted average of the summary measures for regular and temporary contracts only. While more restrictive than the previous one (so-called Version 2), this alternative measure of the overall EPL strictness allows comparisons over a longer period of time (since the late 1980s compared with the late 1990s).

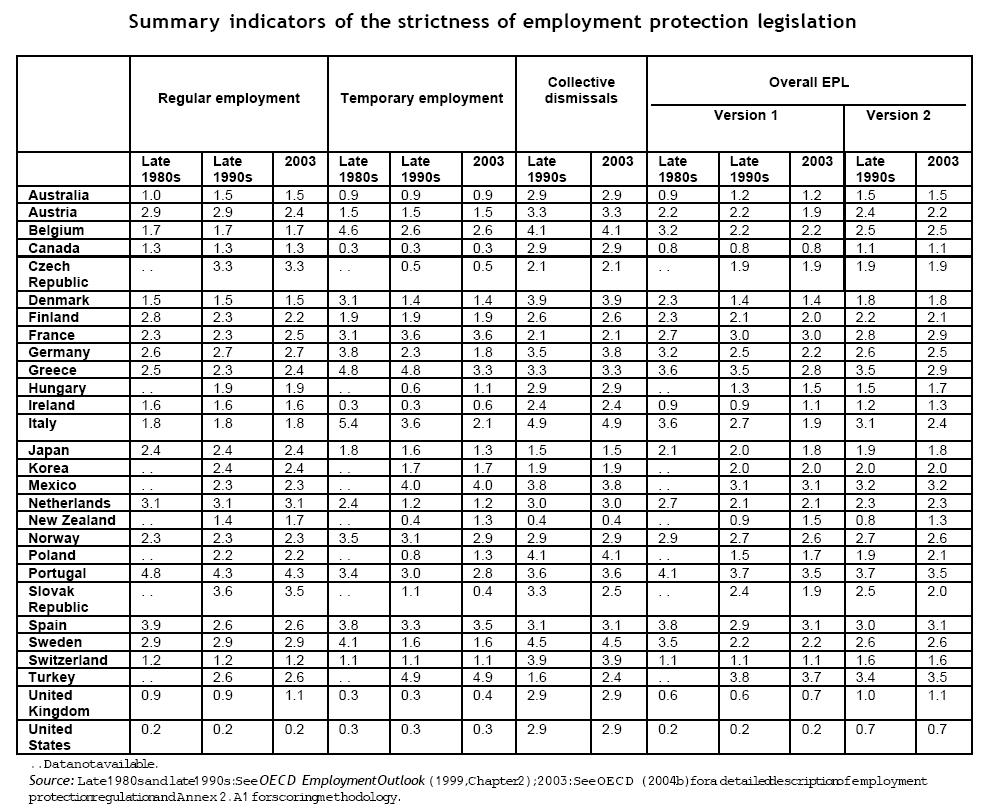
The EPL index elaborated by the OECD.

== Effects of employment protection legislation ==
=== On the duality of the labour market ===
Some economists have claimed that empirical evidence gives support to their theories, according to which EPL leads to a segmentation in the labour market between the so-called insiders, the workers with a protected job, and the outsiders, who are people that are either unemployed or employed with fixed-term, part-time or temporary contracts, or even in the black economy, and face big difficulties to find a job covered by EPL because of the firms’ reduced propensity to hire. This latter group is mainly constituted by youths, women, racial minorities and unskilled workers.

=== On unemployment ===
Whether EPL has any effect on unemployment is an issue of contention between economists. On the one hand, assuming that the cyclical wage pattern is not affected by mandated firing costs, EPL reduces the propensity to hire by employers, since they fear that such decisions will be difficult to reverse in the future, in case of a recession. On the other hand, EPL also leads firms during downswings to keep more workers employed, than they would have otherwise done. Therefore, EPL reduces both job creation and job destruction, so that the net effects on average employment and unemployment are not identifiable a priori. What is instead agreed among economists, is that more stringent EPL lowers the fluctuations in the quantity of labour demanded over the business cycle, leading to smoother dynamic patterns of those aggregates.

Economists considering that EPL has no effect on unemployment include Blanchard and Portugal (2000). In their article they compare two opposite countries as regards their EPL stance: Portugal with one of the more strict legislations in the world and the US with one of the more flexible ones. In spite of these differences, both countries have similar unemployment rates which undermines the argument considering that EPL has any effect on unemployment. Instead, the authors claim that EPL does affect two other variables: job flows and unemployment duration. EPL would reduce job flows (from employment to unemployment: employers are less willing to fire, given that they must pay indemnification to workers) therefore reducing unemployment but would increase unemployment duration, increasing the unemployment rate. These two effects would neutralize each other, explaining why overall, EPL has no effect on unemployment.

Nickell (1997) arrived to similar conclusions when stating that labor market rigidities that do not appear to have serious implications for average levels of unemployment included strict employment protection legislation and general legislation on labor market standards.

Among those that have found evidence suggesting that EPL increases unemployment are Lazear (1990). The author argued that mandated severance pay seemed to increase unemployment rates. His estimates suggested that an increase from zero to three months of severance pay would raise the unemployment rate by 5.5 percent in the United States.

=== On employment ===
Lazear (1990) once again argues he has evidence suggesting that EPL reduces the employment-to-population ratio. In his article he claims that the best estimates suggest that moving from no required severance pay to three months of required severance pay to employees with ten years of service would reduce the employment-population ratio by about one percent. In the United States that would mean over a million jobs. Lazear argues that the young could bear a disproportionate amount of the burden.

To the contrary, Bertola and Bentolila (1990) found evidence supporting the idea that firing costs have a larger effect on firms' propensity to fire than to hire, and therefore (slightly) increase average long-run employment.

=== On wages ===
Several authors have found that EPL has significant effects on wages. As stated by Lazear (1990), in a perfect labor market, severance payments can have no real effects as they can be undone by a properly designed labor contract. Leonardi and Pica (2006) found evidence supporting this claim. They suggest that in the case of Italy an EPL reform in 1990 had as effect to reduce entry wages by 6 percent, implying that firms tend to transfer the increase in the cost of firing (due to EPL) onto workers. In fact, in their study they find that 25 percent of the firing cost was shifted onto lower wages in the case of Italy. Similarly, Brancaccio, Garbellini, and Giammetti (2018) found that EPL reductions have no significant links with real GDP growth whereas they are significantly correlated with wage share reductions.

=== On firm efficiency and profits ===
In principle the effects on profits are ambiguous. Because of EPL, firms engage themselves in labour hoarding practices, which lead them to employ a lower quantity of workers during upswings, while keeping inefficient levels of employment in downturns. For a given level of wages, this loss of productive efficiency would result in lower average profits. On the other hand, if firms operated in a context of efficiency wages, by inducing more stable relationships with the workers and reducing their job and income insecurity, EPL could allow them to pay lower wages, without reducing the effort provided by the labour force employed, with beneficial effects on profits.

=== On product market regulation ===
There appears to be agreement among economists on the positive correlation between product market and employment regulation. Although employment protection legislation is only one aspect of the wide range of regulatory interventions in the labour market, Nicoletti et al. (2000) find evidence suggesting that, across countries, restrictive regulatory environments in the product market tend to be associated with restrictive employment protection policies. They claim that the indicators presented in their paper are closely related, with a statistical correlation of 0.73 (significant at the 1% level). In other words, according to these results, restrictive product market regulations are matched by analogous EPL restrictions to generate a tight overall regulatory environment for firms in their product market as well as in the allocation of labour inputs. The strong correlation between regulatory regimes in the product market and EPL also suggests that their influence may have compounded effects on labour market outcomes, making regulatory reform in only one market less effective than simultaneous reform in the two markets.

Kugler and Pica (2003) find similar results in the case of the Italian economy. They present a matching model which illustrates how barriers to entry in the product market (product market regulation) mitigate the impact of labor market deregulation, (that is, mitigate the effects of a reduction in the strictness of EPL). In the author's opinion, this means that there are economic complementarities between labor and product market policies in their model, in the sense that the effectiveness of one policy depends on the implementation of the other policy. Thus, an important implication of their model is that labor market deregulation will be less effective in the presence of heavier regulations of entry. Similar results are obtained by Koeniger and Vindigni (2003).

=== On hours per worker ===
Whereas EPL may have not a significant effect on unemployment, strict EPL gives incentives to the firms to resort to other sources of flexibility like overtime, which, as shown by Abraham and Houseman (1994), indeed tends to be used much more in Continental European countries, where the variability of hours per worker is significantly higher than in the Anglo-Saxon labour markets.

== Economic theory ==
In economic theory, several authors have argued that employment protection can be desirable when there are frictions in the working of markets. For example, Pissarides (2001) and Alvarez and Veracierto (2001) show that employment protection can play an important role in the absence of perfect insurance markets. Schmitz (2004) argues that constraining contractual freedom by legislating employment protection can be welfare-enhancing when principal-agent relationships are plagued by asymmetric information.

== See also ==
- Labour law
- Labour market
- Labour market flexibility
- Microeconomics
- Occupational licensing
- Unemployment
- Important publications in labour economics
- Job security
