= Precarious work =

Type of non-standard or temporary employment

Precarious work is a term that critics use to describe non-standard or temporary employment that may be poorly paid, insecure, unprotected, and unable to support a household. From this perspective, globalization, the shift from the manufacturing sector to the service sector, and the spread of information technology have created a new economy which demands flexibility in the workplace, resulting in the decline of the standard employment relationship, particularly for women. The characterization of temporary work as "precarious" is disputed by some scholars and entrepreneurs who see these changes as positive for individual workers. Precarious work is ultimately a result of a profit driven capitalist organization of work in which employment is largely understood as a cost that needs to be reduced. The social and political consequences vary greatly in terms of gender, age, race, and class and result in varying degrees of inequality and freedom.

== Contrast with regular and temporary employment ==
The term "precarious work" is frequently associated with the following types of employment: part-time jobs, self-employment, fixed-term work, temporary work, on-call work, and remote workers. Scholars and critics who use the term "precarious work" contrast it with the "standard employment relationship", which is the term they use to describe full-time, continuous employment where the employee works on their employer's premises or under the employer's supervision, under an employment contract of indefinite duration, with standardized working hours/weeks and social benefits such as pensions, unemployment benefits, and medical coverage. This "standard employment relationship" emerged after World War II, as men who completed their education would go on to work full-time for one employer their entire lives until their retirement at the age of 65. It did not typically describe women in the same time period, who would only work temporarily until they got married and had children, at which time they would withdraw from the workforce.

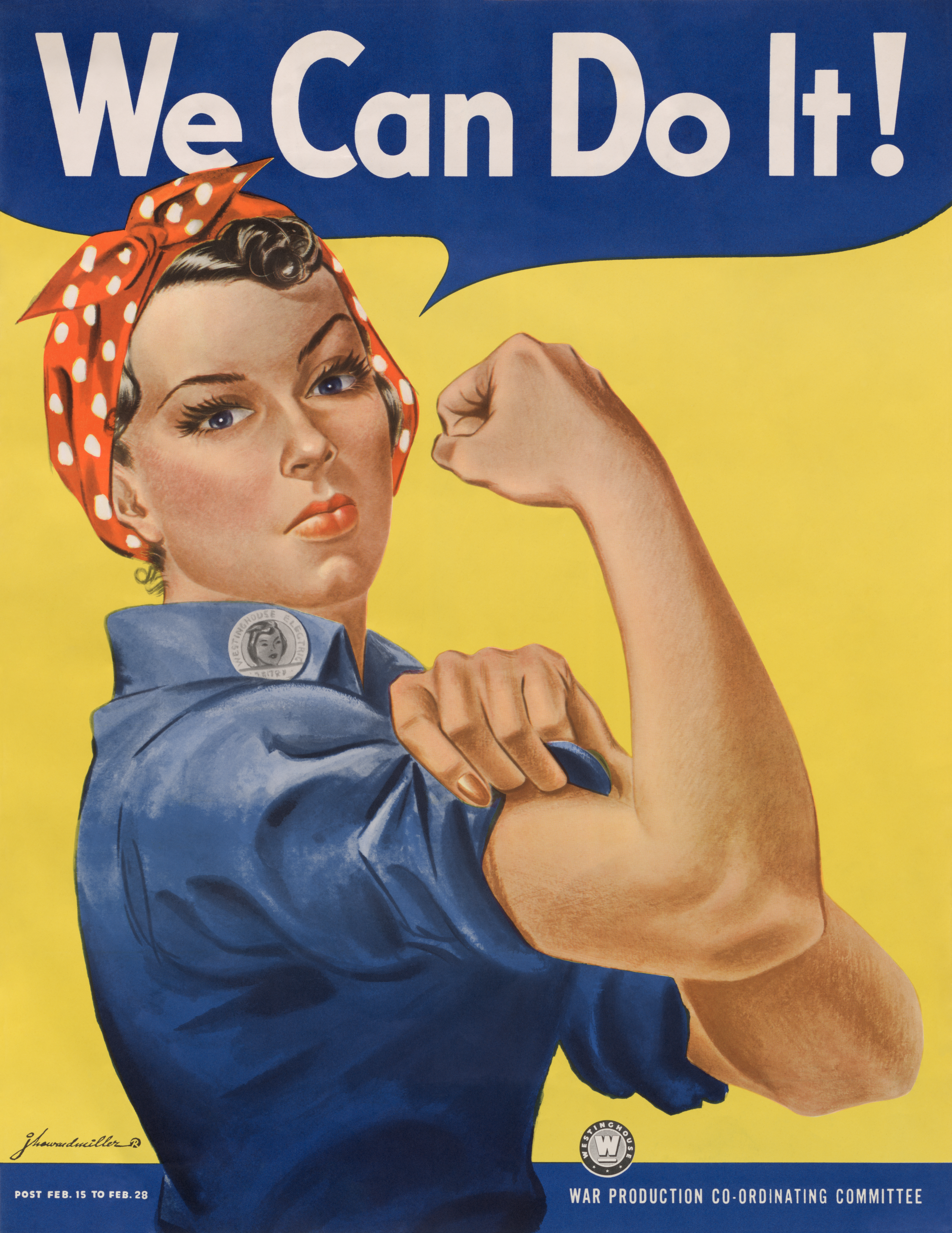
"We Can Do It!" US wartime poster

While many different kinds of part-time or limited-term jobs can be temporary, critics use the term "precarious" strictly to describe work that is uncertain, unpredictable, or offers little to no control over working hours or conditions. This characterization has been challenged by scholars focused on the agency that temporary work affords individual workers. However, many studies promoting individual agency focus on highly educated and skilled knowledge workers, rather than the full range of temporary workers.

== Regulation ==
While increased flexibility in the marketplace and in employment relationships has created new opportunities for regulation, oversight intended explicitly to remediate precarious work often produces mixed results. The International Labour Organization (ILO) has developed standards for atypical and precarious employment, including the 1994 Convention Concerning Part-time Work, the 1996 Convention Concerning Home Work, and the 1999 "Decent Work" initiative.

== See also ==
- Contingent work
- Day labor
- Division of labor
- Flexicurity
- Gig economy
- Labour market flexibility
- Precariat
- Social vulnerability
- Workforce casualisation
- Zero-hour contract
