= Fivesquid.com =

British marketplace website

Fivesquid
- Website type: Online Marketplace
- Available in: English
- Area served: Worldwide
- Industry: Freelance marketplace, Online outsourcing, Service catalog
- Website: fivesquid.uk
- Commercial: Yes
- Registration: Required
- Launched: 2011
- Current status: Closed

Fivesquid.uk is a British-based freelance marketplace website where people can trade skills and services. First launched in 2011, the website hosts a variety of services, from tech jobs like SEO specialist advice to bizarre things like having a man with a parrot produce a quick clip advertising a business. Buyers of services are mainly start-up companies looking to save on business costs.

== History ==
Fivesquid was originally launched in 2011. Following its release, Theo Paphitis selected the company as a start-up company to watch as part of his Small Business Sunday competition.

In March 2012, the website featured in a list of top 10 companies to emerge from the UK recession. Fivesquid featured fifth on the list and was highlighted as the example for selling cheap online services. Throughout the sites history, it has had some strange services offered. In 2012, a entrepreneurial schoolboy from England offered his services as an online gaming bodyguard, at £5 per 30 minutes of gameplay.

After the website had been established a number of years, some began to question the services available on the site. One example used by the London Standard was services that could manipulate social media popularity. Others around the same time stated that many of the service providers are simply out to make extra revenue on top of their main income stream.

The Gadget Show picked the website as one of their top 3 places to buy gifts online.

Service providers' money is stuck there as the website is not opening anymore.

== Site structure ==
Services sold via the website are referred to as "micro-jobs", due to the low prices and short completion time typically involved. All micro-jobs fall within 4 payment structures of either £5, £10, £20 or £50.

Payment for services must be made upfront in order for the work to commence. The money is sent to the sellers account however the buyer's purchase is protected with a service guarantee.

The service providers range from those practicing a hobby to small companies who are attempting to grow their client base. At the completion stage of each project, Fivesquid take a 20% commission payment from the total value, before releasing the funds to the service provider.

Service providers' earnings are paid out by Fivesquid using PayPal. As of June 2017, no other payment methods are available.
