= Labour market flexibility =

Speed with which labour markets adapt to changes

The degree of labour market flexibility is the speed with which labour markets adapt to fluctuations and changes in society, the economy or production. This entails enabling labour markets to reach a continuous equilibrium determined by the intersection of the demand and supply curves.

Labour unions can limit labor market flexibility by negotiating higher wages, benefits, and better working conditions with employers. In the words of Siebert, labour unions were seen to inhibit "the clearing functions of the market by weakening the demand for labor, making it less attractive to hire a worker by explicitly pushing up the wage costs or by introducing a negative shadow price for labor; by distorting the labor supply; and by impairing the equilibrating function of the market mechanism (for instance, by influencing bargaining behavior)."

== Theory ==
The most well-known concept of labour market flexibility is given by Atkinson. Based on the strategies companies use, he notes that there can be four types of flexibility.

=== External numerical flexibility ===
External numerical flexibility is the adjustment of the labour intake, or the number of workers from the external market. This can be achieved by employing workers on temporary work or fixed-term contracts or through relaxed hiring and firing regulations or in other words relaxation of employment protection legislation, where employers can hire and fire permanent employees according to the firms' needs. Employers typically prefer high levels of unemployment because, as workers become more desperate for employment, they are willing to work for lower wages, thus increasing employer profits.

=== Internal numerical flexibility ===
Internal numerical flexibility, sometimes known as working time flexibility or temporal flexibility, is achieved by adjusting working hours or schedules of workers already employed within the firm. This includes part-time, flexi time or flexible working hours or shifts (including night shifts and weekend shifts), working time accounts, leaves such as parental leave, and overtime. Many employers thus hire large numbers of part-time employees to avoid government regulations associated with full-time employees, such as the requirement that employers pay for health insurance of their full-time employees. This allows employers to maximize their own profits while decreasing the standard of living of the working classes.

=== Functional flexibility ===
Functional flexibility or organizational flexibility is the extent to which employees can be transferred to different activities and tasks within the firm. It has to do with organization of operation or management and training workers. This can also be achieved by outsourcing activities. Job rotation is a label given to many functional flexibility schemes.

=== Financial or wage flexibility ===
Financial or wage flexibility occurs when wage levels are not decided collectively and there are more differences between the wages of workers. This is done so that pay and other employment costs reflect the supply and demand of labour and so that employers can force employees to compete for wages, thus lowering the average wage paid to employees and ultimately to maximize profits while decreasing the standard of living of the working classes. This can be achieved by rate-for-the-job systems, or assessment based pay system, or individual performance wages.

== Flexibility for workers ==
Labour market flexibility refers to more than the strategies used by employers to adapt to their production or business cycles as it is in the definitions above. Increasingly, the common view is that labour market flexibility can potentially be used for both workers and companies, or employees and employers. It can also be used as a method to enable workers to "adjust working life and working hours to their own preferences and to other activities". As companies adapt to business cycles and facilitate their needs through the use of labour market flexibility strategies, workers adapt their life cycles and their needs through it (Chung, 2006).

The European Commission also addresses this issue in its Joint Employment Report and its new Flexicurity approach, calling for an adequate method to enhance flexibility for both workers and employers that is "capable of quickly and effectively mastering new productive needs and skills and about facilitating the combination of work and private responsibilities." ETUC also emphasizes the importance of the development of working time flexibility as an alternative to implementing external flexibility as the sole method of increasing flexibility in the labour market (ETUC, 2007).

In their report on working time, the TUC has also argued that flexible working should be extended to all workers through stronger regulations. As authors Gerson and Jacobs agree, "flexibility and autonomy are only useful if workers feel able to use them" (Gerson & Jacobs, 2004, pg. 238).

Some of the widely used arrangements that enable workers more flexibility in their work include flextime, remote work, and part-time jobs.

== See also ==
- Contingent work – Non-permanent type of employment
- Corporate amnesia – Loss of shared knowledge and experience
- Employment Protection Legislation
- Flexicurity – Welfare-state model with a pro-active labour market policy
- Flexitime – Flexible hours schedule in workdays
- Labour economics – Study of the markets for wage labour
- Labour law – Laws that govern the relationship between workers, employers, unions and governments
- Occupational licensing – Form of government regulation on professions or vocations for compensation
- Precarity – Lacking in predictability, job security, material or psychological welfare
  - Precarious work – Type of non-standard or temporary employment, Unemployment – People without work and actively seeking work, Gig economy – Economic system of freelance workers
  - Exploitation of labour – Economic phenomenon
- Working time – Period of time that an individual spends at paid occupational labor
