= Labour law =

Laws that govern the relationship between workers, employers, unions and governments

Labour laws (also spelled as labor laws), labour code or employment laws are laws that mediate the relationship between workers, employing entities, trade unions, and the government. Collective labour law relates to the tripartite relationship between employee, employer, and union.

Individual labour law concerns employees' rights at work also through the contract for work. Employment standards are social norms (in some cases also technical standards) for the minimum socially acceptable conditions under which employees or contractors are allowed to work. Government agencies (such as the former US Employment Standards Administration) enforce labour law (legislature, regulatory, or judicial).

== History ==
Following the unification of the city-states in Assyria and Sumer by Sargon of Akkad into a single empire ruled from his home city circa 2334 BC, common Mesopotamian standards for length, area, volume, weight, and time used by artisan guilds in each city was promulgated by Naram-Sin of Akkad (c. 2254–2218 BC), Sargon's grandson, including for shekels. Code of Hammurabi Law 234 (c. 1755–1750 BC) stipulated a 2-shekel prevailing wage for each 60-gur (300-bushel) vessel constructed in an employment contract between a shipbuilder and a ship-owner.

Law 275 stipulated a ferry rate of 3-gerah per day on a charterparty between a ship charterer and a shipmaster. Law 276 stipulated a 2 1/2-gerah per day freight rate on a contract of affreightment between a charterer and shipmaster, while Law 277 stipulated a 1/6-shekel per day freight rate for a 60-gur vessel.

In 1816, an archaeological excavation in Minya, Egypt (under an Eyalet of the Ottoman Empire) produced a Nerva–Antonine dynasty-era tablet from the ruins of the Temple of Antinous in Antinoöpolis, Aegyptus that prescribed the rules and membership dues of a burial society collegium established in Lanuvium, Italia in approximately 133 AD during the reign of Hadrian (117–138) of the Roman Empire.

A collegium was any association in ancient Rome that acted as a legal entity. Following the passage of the Lex Julia during the reign of Julius Caesar as Consul and Dictator of the Roman Republic (49–44 BC), and their reaffirmation during the reign of Caesar Augustus as Princeps senatus and Imperator of the Roman Army (27 BC–14 AD), collegia required the approval of the Roman Senate or the Emperor in order to be authorized as legal bodies. Ruins at Lambaesis date the formation of burial societies among Roman Army soldiers and Roman Navy mariners to the reign of Septimius Severus (193–211) in 198 AD.

In September 2011, archaeological investigations done at the site of the artificial harbour Portus in Rome revealed inscriptions in a shipyard constructed during the reign of Trajan (98–117) indicating the existence of a shipbuilders guild. Rome's La Ostia port was home to a guildhall for a corpus naviculariorum, a collegium of merchant mariners. Collegium also included fraternities of Roman priests overseeing ritual sacrifices, practicing augury, keeping scriptures, arranging festivals, and maintaining specific religious cults.

Labour law arose in parallel with the Industrial Revolution as the relationship between worker and employer changed from small-scale production studios to large-scale factories. Workers sought better conditions and the right to join a labour union, while employers sought a more predictable, flexible and less costly workforce. The state of labour law at any one time is therefore both the product of and a component of struggles between various social forces.

As England was the first country to industrialize, it was also the first to face the often appalling consequences of the industrial revolution in a less regulated economic framework. Over the course of the late 18th and early to the mid-19th century the foundation for modern labour law was slowly laid, However, in the early days, there were some unequal aspects, such as the target being limited to women and children and not adult men, as some of the more egregious aspects, of working conditions were steadily ameliorated through legislation. This was largely achieved through the concerted pressure from social reformers, notably Anthony Ashley-Cooper, 7th Earl of Shaftesbury, and others.

=== Child labour ===
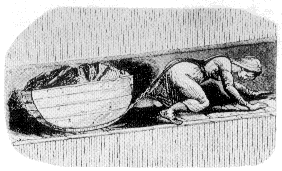
The first general laws against child labour, the Factory Acts, were passed in Britain in the first half of the 19th century.

A serious outbreak of fever in 1784 in cotton mills near Manchester drew widespread public opinion against the use of children in dangerous conditions. A local inquiry presided over by Dr Thomas Percival, was instituted by the justices of the peace for Lancashire, and the resulting report recommended the limitation of children's working hours. In 1802, the first major piece of labour legislation was passed − the Health and Morals of Apprentices Act 1802. This was the first, albeit modest, step towards the protection of labour. The act limited working hours to twelve a day and abolished night work. It required the provision of a basic level of education for all apprentices, as well as adequate sleeping accommodation and clothing.

The rapid industrialisation of manufacturing at the turn of the 19th century led to a rapid increase in child employment, and public opinion was steadily made aware of the terrible conditions these children were forced to endure. The Cotton Mills and Factories Act 1819 was the outcome of the efforts of the industrialist Robert Owen and prohibited child labour under nine years of age and limited the working hours to twelve. A great milestone in labour law was reached with the Factories Act 1833, which limited the employment of children under eighteen years of age, prohibited all night work, and, crucially, provided for inspectors to enforce the law. Pivotal in the campaigning for and the securing of this legislation were Michael Sadler and the Earl of Shaftesbury. This act was an important step forward, in that it mandated skilled inspection of workplaces and rigorous enforcement of the law by an independent governmental body.

A lengthy campaign to limit the working day to ten hours was led by Shaftesbury and included support from the Anglican Church. Many committees were formed in support of the cause and some previously established groups lent their support as well. The campaign finally led to the passage of the Factory Act 1847, which restricted the working hours of women and children in British factories to effectively 10 hours per day.

During the late 19th century, the Austrian half of Austria-Hungary introduced labour legislation regulating industrial working conditions. The Industrial Code amendment of 1885 prohibited industrial employment for children under the age of fourteen and limited the working day of older minors to eleven hours.

=== Working conditions ===
These early efforts were principally aimed at limiting child labour. From the mid-19th century, attention was first paid to the plight of working conditions for the workforce in general. In 1850, systematic reporting of fatal accidents was made compulsory, and basic safeguards for health, life and limb in the mines were put in place from 1855. Further regulations, relating to ventilation, fencing of disused shafts, signalling standards, and proper gauges and valves for steam-boilers and related machinery were also set down.

A series of further acts, the Mines Act 1860 (23 & 24 Vict. c. 151) and the Coal Mines Regulation Act 1872 (35 & 36 Vict. c. 76) extended the legal provisions and strengthened safety provisions. The steady development of the coal industry, an increasing association among miners, and increased scientific knowledge paved the way for the Coal Mines Regulation Act 1872, which extended the legislation to similar industries. The same act included the first comprehensive code of regulation to govern legal safeguards for health, life and limb. The presence of more certified and competent management and increased levels of inspection were also provided for.

By the end of the century, a comprehensive set of regulations was in place in England that affected all industries. A similar system, with certain national differences, was implemented in other industrializing countries during the latter part of the 19th century and the early 20th century.

== Individual labour law ==
=== Employment terms ===
The basic feature of labour law in almost every country is that the rights and obligations of the worker and the employer are mediated through a contract of employment between the two. This has been the case since the collapse of feudalism. Many contract terms and conditions are covered by legislation or common law. In the US for example, the majority of state laws allow for employment to be "at-will", meaning the employer can terminate an employee from a position for any reason so long as the reason is not explicitly prohibited, (Note: For example, an employee's refusal to violate law or an employee's assertion of rights.) and, conversely, an employee may quit at any time, for any reason (or for no reason), and is not required to give notice.

A major issue for any business is to understand the relationship between the worker and the master. There are two types of workers, independent contractors and employees. They are differentiated based on the level of control the master has on them. Workers provided tools and resources, closely supervised, paid regularly, etc., are considered employees of the company. Employees must act in the best interest of the employer.

One example of employment terms in many countries is the duty to provide written particulars of employment with the essentialia negotii (Latin for "essential terms") to an employee. This aims to allow the employee to know concretely what to expect and what is expected. It covers items including compensation, holiday and illness rights, notice in the event of dismissal and job description.

The contract is subject to various legal provisions. An employer may not legally offer a contract that pays the worker less than a minimum wage. An employee may not agree to a contract that allows an employer to dismiss them for illegal reasons. (Note: In the US, under the National Labor Relations Act, a worker has no right to organize where he is considered a manager, see NLRB v. Kentucky River Community Care, 532 U.S. 706 (2001))

Intellectual property is the vital asset of the business, employees add value to the company by creating Intellectual Property. As per Trade Related Aspects of Intellectual Property Rights (TRIPS), Intellectual Property is personal property. Intellectual property is used as competitive advantage by big companies to protect themselves from rivalry. Given the conditions, if the worker is in the agent-principal relationship, he is the employee of the company, and if the employee's invention is in the scope of employment i.e. if the employee creates a new product or process to increase the productivity and create organizations' wealth by utilizing the resources of the company, then the Intellectual property solely belongs to the company. New business products or processes are protected under Patents.

There are differing opinions on what constitutes a patentable invention. One area of disagreement is with respect to software inventions, but there have been court cases that have established some precedents. For example, in the case Diamond v. Diehr the US Supreme Court decided that Diehr is patent- eligible because they improved the existing technological process, not because they were implemented on a computer.

=== Minimum wage ===
Many jurisdictions define the minimum amount that a worker can be paid per hour. Algeria, Australia, Belgium, Brazil, Canada, China, France, Greece, Hungary, India, Ireland, Japan, South Korea, Luxembourg, the Netherlands, New Zealand, Paraguay, Portugal, Poland, Romania, Spain, Taiwan, the UK, the US, Vietnam, Germany (in 2015) and others have laws of this kind. The minimum wage is set usually higher than the lowest wage as determined by the forces of supply and demand in a free market and therefore acts as a price floor. Each country sets its own minimum wage laws and regulations, and while a majority of industrialized countries has a minimum wage, many developing countries do not.

Minimum wages are regulated and stipulated in some countries that lack explicit laws. The US has explicit minimum wage laws, whereas other countries such as Sweden might lack explicit laws. In Sweden minimum wages are negotiated between the labour market parties (unions and employer organizations) through collective agreements that also cover non-union workers at workplaces with collective agreements.

At workplaces without collective agreements there exist no minimum wages. Non-organized employers can sign substitute agreements directly with trade unions but far from all do. The Swedish case illustrates that in countries without statutory regulation part of the labour market may not have regulated minimum wages, as self-regulation only applies to workplaces and employees covered by collective agreements (in Sweden about 90 per cent of employees).

National minimum wage laws were first introduced in the United States in 1938, Brazil in 1940 India in 1948, France in 1950 and in the UK in 1998. In the European Union, 18 out of 28 member states have national minimum wages as of 2011.

=== Living wage ===
The living wage is higher than the minimum wage and is designed so that a full-time worker should be able to support themselves and a small family at that wage.

=== Hours ===
The maximum number of hours worked per day or over other time intervals is set by law in many countries. Such laws also regulate whether workers who work longer hours must be paid additional compensation.

Before the Industrial Revolution, the workday varied between 11 and 14 hours. With the growth of industrialism and the introduction of machinery, longer hours became far more common, reaching as high as 16 hours per day. The eight-hour movement led to the first law on the length of a working day, passed in 1833 in England. It limited miners to 12 hours and children to 8 hours. The 10-hour day was established in 1848, and shorter hours with the same pay were gradually accepted thereafter. The Health and Morals of Apprentices Act 1802 (42 Geo. 3. c. 73) was the first labour law in the UK.

Germany was the next European country to pass labour laws. Chancellor Otto von Bismarck's main goal was to undermine the Social Democratic Party of Germany. In 1878, Bismarck instituted a variety of anti-socialist measures, but despite this, socialists continued gaining seats in the Reichstag. To appease the working class, he enacted a variety of paternalistic social reforms, which became the first type of social security.

In 1883, the Health Insurance Act was passed, which entitled workers to health insurance. The worker paid two-thirds and the employer one-third of the premiums. Accident insurance was provided in 1884, while old-age pensions and disability insurance followed in 1889. Other laws restricted the employment of women and children. These efforts, however, were not entirely successful; the working class largely remained unreconciled with Bismarck's conservative government.

In France, the first labour law was voted in 1841. It limited under-age miners' hours. In the Third Republic labour law was first effectively enforced, in particular after the Waldeck-Rousseau 1884 law legalising trade unions. With the Matignon Accords, the Popular Front (1936–38) enacted the laws mandating 12 days each year of paid vacations for workers and the law limiting the standard workweek to 40 hours.

=== Health and safety ===
Other labour laws involve safety concerning workers. The earliest English factory law was passed in 1802 and dealt with the safety and health of child labourers in textile mills.

=== Discrimination ===
Such laws prohibit discrimination against employees, in particular racial discrimination or gender discrimination.

=== Dismissal ===
Convention no. 158 of the International Labour Organization states that an employee "can't be fired without any legitimate motive" and "before offering him the possibility to defend himself". Thus, on 28 April 2006, after the unofficial repeal of the French First Employment Contract, the Longjumeau (Essonne) conseil des prud'hommes (labour law court) judged the New Employment Contract contrary to international law and therefore "illegitimate" and "without any juridical value". The court considered that the two-years period of "fire at will" (without any legal motive) was "unreasonable", and contrary to convention.

=== Child labour ===
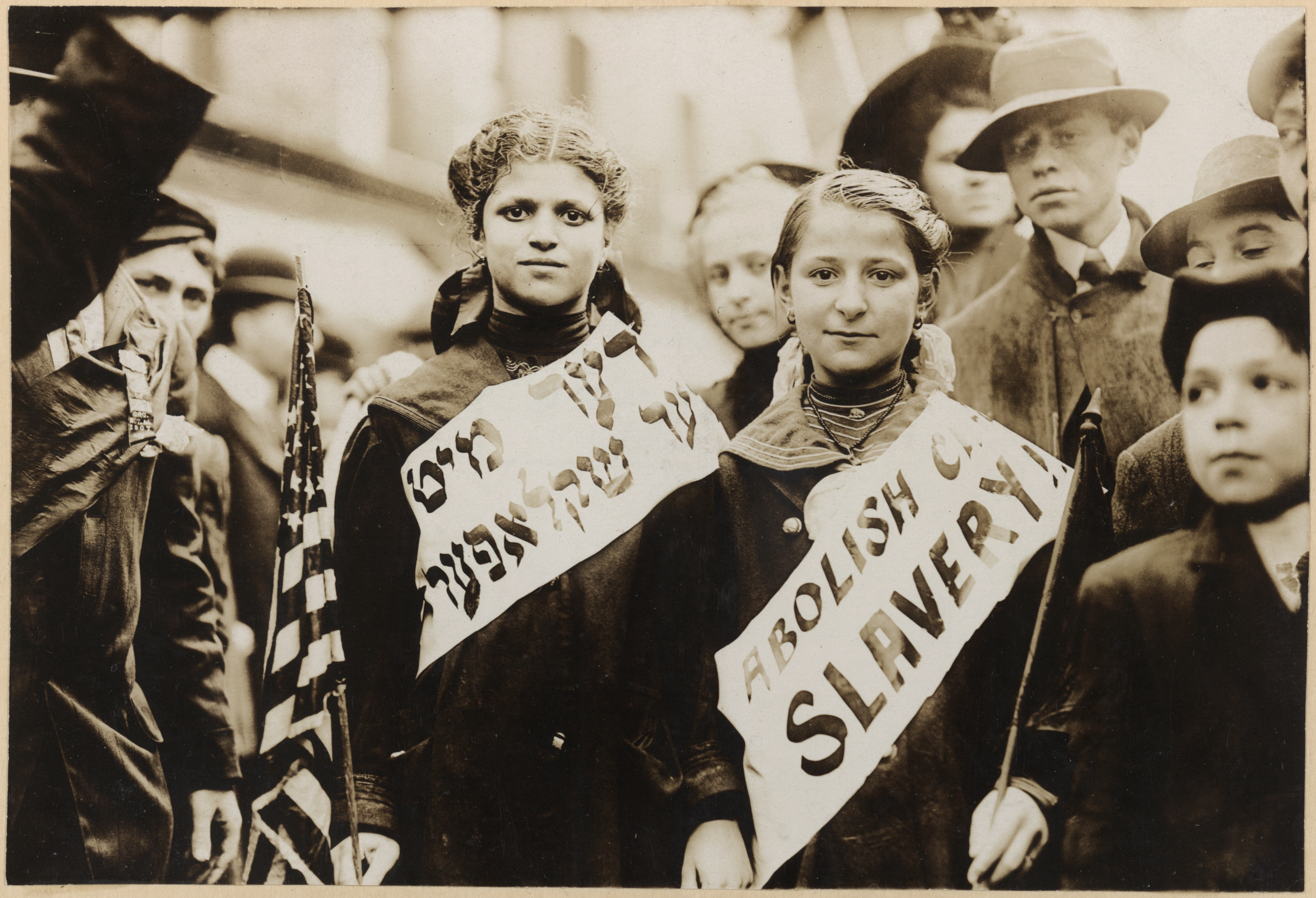
Two girls wearing banners in Yiddish and English with the slogan "Abolish child slavery!!" at the 1909 International Workers' Day parade in New York City

Child labour was not seen as a problem throughout most of history, only disputed with the beginning of universal schooling and the concepts of labourers' and children's rights. Use of child labour was commonplace, often in factories. In England and Scotland in 1788, about two-thirds of persons working in water-powered textile factories were children. Child labour can be factory work, mining or quarrying, agriculture, helping in the parents' business, operating a small business (such as selling food), or doing odd jobs.

Children work as guides for tourists, sometimes combined with bringing in business for shops and restaurants (where they may also work). Other children do jobs such as assembling boxes or polishing shoes. However, rather than in factories and sweatshops, most child labour in the twenty-first century occurs in the informal sector, "selling on the street, at work in agriculture or hidden away in houses — far from the reach of official inspectors and from media scrutiny."

== Collective labour law ==
Collective labour law concerns the relationship between employer, employee and trade unions. Trade unions (also "labour unions" in the US) are organizations which generally aim to promote the interests of their members. This law regulates the wages, benefits, and duties of the employees, and the dispute management between the company and the trade union. Such matters are often described in a collective labour agreement (CLA).

=== Trade unions ===
Trade unions are organized groups of workers who engage in collective bargaining with employers. Some countries require unions or employers to follow particular procedures in pursuit of their goals. For example, some countries require that unions poll the membership to approve a strike or to approve using members' dues for political projects. Laws may govern the circumstances and procedures under which unions are formed. They may guarantee the right to join a union (banning employer discrimination) or remain silent in this respect. Some legal codes allow unions to obligate their members, such as the requirement to comply with a majority decision in a strike vote. Some restrict this, such as "right to work" legislation in parts of the United States.

In different organizations across different countries, trade unions discuss matters with employers on behalf of employees. At that time, trade unions communicate with the workforce of the organization. In this role, trade unions act as a bridge between employees and employers.

=== Workplace participation ===
A legally binding right for workers as a group to participate in workplace management is acknowledged in some form in most developed countries. In a majority of EU member states (for example, Germany, Sweden, and France), the workforce has a right to elect directors on the board of large corporations. This is usually called "codetermination" and currently most countries allow for the election of one-third of the board, though the workforce can have the right to elect anywhere from a single director, to just under a half in Germany. However, German company law uses a split board system, in which a "supervisory board" appoints an "executive board".

Under the Mitbestimmungsgesetz 1976, shareholders and employees elect the supervisory board in equal numbers, but the head of the supervisory board with a casting vote is a shareholder representative. The first statutes to introduce board-level codetermination were in Britain, however, most of these measures, except in universities, were removed in 1948 and 1979. The oldest surviving statute is found in the United States, in the Massachusetts Laws on manufacturing corporations, introduced in 1919, however, this was always voluntary.

In the United Kingdom, similar proposals were drawn up, and a command paper produced named the Bullock Report (Industrial Democracy) was released in 1977 by the James Callaghan Labour Party government. Unions would have directly elected half of the board. An "independent" element would also be added. However, the proposal was not enacted. The European Commission offered proposals for worker participation in the "fifth company law directive", which was also not implemented.

In Sweden, participation is regulated through the "Law on board representation". The law covers all private companies with 25 or more employees. In these companies, workers (usually through unions) have a right to appoint two board members and two substitutes. If the company has more than 1,000 employees, this rises to three members and three substitutes. It is common practice to allocate them among the major union coalitions.

=== Information and consultation ===
Workplace statutes in many countries require that employers consult their workers on various issues.

=== Collective action ===
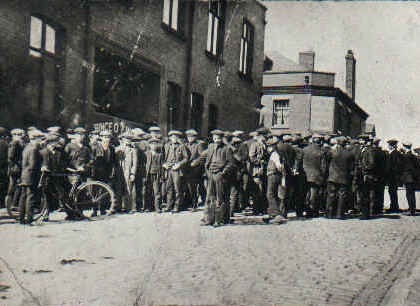
Strikers gathering in Tyldesley, Greater Manchester in the 1926 United Kingdom general strike

Strike action is the worker tactic most associated with industrial disputes. In most countries, strikes are legal under a circumscribed set of conditions. Among them may be that:

- The strike is decided on by a prescribed democratic process (wildcat strikes are illegal).
- Sympathy strikes, against a company by which workers are not directly employed, may be prohibited.
- General strikes may be forbidden for example, among public safety workers, to maintain public order.

A boycott is a refusal to buy, sell, or otherwise trade with an individual or business. Other tactics include go-slow, sabotage, work-to-rule, sit-in or en-masse not reporting to work. Some labour law explicitly bans such activity, none explicitly allows it.

Picketing is often used by workers during strikes. They may congregate near the business they are striking against to make their presence felt, increase worker participation and dissuade (or prevent) strike breakers from entering the workplace. In many countries, this activity is restricted by law, by more general law restricting demonstrations, or by injunctions on particular pickets.

For example, labour law may restrict secondary picketing (picketing a business connected with the company not directly with the dispute, such as a supplier), or flying pickets (mobile strikers who travel to join a picket). Laws may prohibit obstructing others from conducting lawful business; outlaw obstructive pickets allow court orders to restrict picketing locations or behaving in particular ways (shouting abuse, for example).

== International labour law ==
The labour movement has long been concerned that economic globalization would weaken worker bargaining power, as their employers could hire workers abroad to avoid domestic labour standards. Karl Marx said:

The extension of the principle of free trade, which induces between nations such a competition that the interest of the workman is liable to be lost sight of and sacrificed in the fierce international race between capitalists, demands that such organizations [unions] should be still further extended and made international.

The International Labour Organization and the World Trade Organization have been a primary focus among international bodies for regulating labour markets. Conflicts arise when people work in more than one country. EU law has a growing body of workplace rules.

=== International Labour Organization ===
Following World War I, the Treaty of Versailles contained the first constitution of a new International Labour Organization (ILO) founded on the principle that "labour is not a commodity", and for the reason that "peace can be established only if it is based upon social justice". ILO's primary role has been to coordinate international labour law by issuing Conventions. ILO members can voluntarily adopt and ratify the Conventions. For instance, the first Hours of Work (Industry) Convention, 1919 required a maximum of a 48-hour week, and has been ratified by 52 out of 185 member states. The UK ultimately refused to ratify the Convention, as did many current EU members, although the Working Time Directive adopts its principles, subject to individual opt-out. (Note: Two further general working time conventions are the Forty-Hour Week Convention (No. 51) and the Holidays with Pay Convention (No. 52). For general information, see Ewing, Keith (1994). Britain and the ILO (2nd ed.). London: Institute of Employment Rights. p. 16. ISBN 9781873271339.) ILO's constitution comes from the 1944 Declaration of Philadelphia and under the 1998 Declaration on Fundamental Principles and Rights at Work classified eight conventions (Note: There are 189 Conventions, however some have been superseded by others. For instance, Conventions No. 2, 34, 96, and 181 all concern private employment agencies, but only Convention 181 is in force.) as core.

These require freedom to join a union, bargain collectively and take action (Conventions No. 87 and 98), abolition of forced labour (29 and 105), abolition of labour by children before the end of compulsory school (138 and 182), and no discrimination at work (No. 100 and 111). Member compliance with the core Conventions is obligatory, even if the country has not ratified the Convention in question. To ensure compliance, the ILO is limited to gathering evidence and reporting on member states' progress, relying on publicity to create pressure to reform. Global reports on core standards are produced yearly, while individual reports on countries who have ratified other Conventions are compiled on a bi-annual or less frequent basis.

As one of the only international organizations with real enforcement power through trade sanctions, the WTO has been the target for calls by labour lawyers to incorporate global standards of the International Labour Organization.

Because the ILO's enforcement mechanisms are weak, incorporating labour standards in the World Trade Organization's (WTO) operation has been proposed. WTO oversees, primarily, the General Agreement on Tariffs and Trade treaty aimed at reducing customs, tariffs and other barriers to import and export of goods, services and capital between its 157 member countries. Unlike for the ILO, contravening WTO rules as recognized by the dispute settlement procedures opens a country to retaliation through trade sanctions. This could include reinstatement of targeted tariffs against the offender.

Proponents have called for a "social clause" to be inserted into the GATT agreements, for example, by amending Article XX, which provides an exception that allows imposition of sanctions for breaches of human rights. An explicit reference to core labour standards could allow comparable action where a WTO member state breaches ILO standards. Opponents argue that such an approach could undermine labour rights, because industries, and therefore workforces could be harmed with no guarantee of reform. Furthermore, it was argued in the 1996 Singapore Ministerial Declaration 1996 that "the comparative advantage of countries, particularly low-age developing countries, must in no way be put into question."

Some countries want to take advantage of low wages and fewer rules as a comparative advantage to boost their economies. Another contested point is whether business moves production from high wage to low wage countries, given potential differences in worker productivity. Since GATT, most trade agreements have been bilateral. Some of these protect core labour standards. (Note: e.g. European Union–South Korea Free Trade Agreement (14 May 2011) OJ 2011 L127, Article 13.) Moreover, in domestic tariff regulations, some countries give preference to countries that respect core labour rights, for example under the EC Tariff Preference Regulation, articles 7 and 8.

=== Work in multiple countries ===
Conflicts of laws (or private international law) issues arise where workers work in multiple jurisdictions. If a US worker performs part of her job in Brazil, China and Denmark (a "peripatetic" worker) an employer may seek to characterize the employment contract as governed by the law of the country where labour rights are least favourable to the worker, or seek to argue that the most favourable system of labour rights does not apply. For example, in a UK labour law case, Ravat v Halliburton Manufacturing and Services Ltd Ravat was from the UK but was employed in Libya by a German company that was part of Halliburton. He was dismissed by a supervisor based in Egypt. He was told he would be hired under UK law terms and conditions, and this was arranged by a staffing department in Aberdeen. Under the UK Employment Rights Act 1996 he would have a right to claim unfair dismissal, but the Act left open the question of the statute's territorial scope. The UK Supreme Court held that the principle would be that an expatriate worker, would be subject to UK rules if the worker could show a "close connection" to the UK, which was found in Rabat's case. (Note: See also Lawson v Serco Ltd (2006 UKHL 3) and Duncombe v Secretary of State for Children, Schools and Families (2011 UKSC 36))

This fits within the general framework in the EU. Under EU Rome I Regulation article 8, workers have employment rights of the country where they habitually work. They may have a claim in another country if they can establish a close connection to it. The Regulation emphasises that the rules should be applied with the purpose of protecting the worker.

It is also necessary that a court has jurisdiction to hear a claim. Under the Brussels I Regulation article 19, this requires the worker habitually works in the place where the claim is brought or is engaged there.

=== EU law ===
The European Union has extensive labour laws that officially exclude, according to the Treaty on the Functioning of the European Union, matters around direct wage regulation (e.g. setting a minimum wage), the fairness of dismissals and collective bargaining. A series of Directives regulate almost all other issues, for instance the Working Time Directive guarantees 28 days of paid holiday, the Equality Framework Directive prohibits all forms of discrimination and the Collective Redundancies Directive requires that proper notice is given and consultation takes place on decisions about economic dismissals.

The European Court of Justice has recently extended the Treaty's provisions via case law. Trade unions have sought to organize across borders in the same way that multinational corporations have organized production globally. Unions have sought to take collective action and strikes internationally. This coordination was challenged in the European Union in two controversial decisions. In Laval Ltd v Swedish Builders Union a group of Latvian workers were sent to a construction site in Sweden. The local union took industrial action to make Laval Ltd sign up to the local collective bargaining agreement.

Under the Posted Workers Directive, article 3 requires member states to guarantee workers posted to their territory, "on the basis of equality of treatment", the host state's terms and conditions of employment on a list of matters, such as maximum work periods, minimum paid annual leave and health and safety at work, where these are laid down by law or by universally applicable collective agreements. Since 30 July 2020, following Directive (EU) 2018/957, the pay guarantee covers the host state's "remuneration", where the original 1996 text guaranteed only its "minimum rates of pay". Article 3(7) says that this "shall not prevent application of terms and conditions of employment which are more favourable to workers". Most people thought this meant that more favourable conditions could be given than the minimum (e.g., in Latvian law) by the host state's legislation or a collective agreement.

The European Court of Justice (ECJ) said that only the local state could raise standards beyond its minimum for foreign workers. Any attempt by the host state, or a collective agreement (unless the collective agreement is declared universal under article 3(8)) would infringe the business' freedom under TFEU article 56. This decision was implicitly reversed by the European Union legislature in the Rome I Regulation, which makes clear in recital 34 that the host state may allow more favourable standards.

In The Rosella, the ECJ held that a blockade by the International Transport Workers' Federation against a business that was using an Estonian flag of convenience (i.e., saying it was operating under Estonian law to avoid labour standards of Finland) infringed the business' right of free establishment under TFEU article 49. The ECJ said that it recognized the workers' "right to strike" in accordance with ILO Convention 87, but said that its use must be proportionately to the right of the business' establishment.

== National labour laws ==
=== Angola ===
Workers may join unions. All non-government workers may strike, though there are strict rules governing this. The ruling party is traditionally tied to labor, and some unions are government-run. Collective bargaining is technically permitted but is subject in practice to restrictions. Forced labor is illegal, but occurs, with many men and boys being trafficked into Angola for forced labor in construction and other sectors. Children under 14 are not allowed to work, but many children work on family farms, as street vendors, and in homes. Some children are forced to work as prostitutes, in the drug transport or sales, and as international couriers. There are many street children who beg, perform such jobs as shoeshining and carwashing, commit small crimes, or are sexually exploited. There is a low minimum wage, with most people relying on multiple jobs to earn a living. Most workers are employed in agricultural jobs or other sectors in which there is little or no government control of working conditions. There are laws that regulate working conditions but they are not well enforced even in the formal sector. Workers' rights are routinely violated with impunity. The occupational health and safety standards are poorly enforced, as are rulings on labor violations.

=== Australia ===
The Fair Work Act of 2009 provides the regulations governing the majority of Australian workplaces and employers. Australia has a minimum wage and workplace conditions overseen by the Fair Work Commission. The right to strike in Australia is tightly regulated and arguably substantively limited by the Fair Work system. Australia has experienced declining rates of union membership and an associated decrease in collective bargaining.

Most State Governments in Australia have maintained separate systems of regulation of industrial relations and employment, usually only for certain Government sector employees. Western Australia's state industrial relations system has broader coverage applying to approximately 40% of workers. Comparatively to the Fair Work system, State systems typically provide for less prescriptive regulation regarding employment conditions, the right to strike and the rights of Unions and a greater emphasis on collective bargaining.

=== Benin ===
Workers are allowed to unionize and to strike, although they are required to provide three days' notice of strikes and the government can prohibit them for a variety of reasons. Workers, except for those in merchant shipping, are also entitled to bargain collectively. There is a National Consultation and Collective Bargaining Commission that takes part in such negotiations. Forced labor is illegal, although it exists in a number of sectors, with children often involved. Children under 12 may not work at any job; those between 12 and 14 may do light work or hold domestic jobs. But these restrictions are not fully enforced, and in reality children as young as seven work in farms, businesses, construction, markets, and other settings, with some being indentured to "agents" and put to work in other countries.

Owing to a shortage of inspectors, the labor code is enforced poorly and only in the so-called formal sector. There is a minimum wage but it is very low, and there are various restrictions on working hours and the like but these are generally only enforced in the "formal sector". Health and safety standards are not enforced effectively either.

=== Belgium ===
Belgian law guarantees workers the right to unionize and bargain collectively, and all workers except those in the military have the right to strike. Although compulsory labor is illegal, individuals from Eastern Europe, sub-Saharan Africa, and Asia are trafficked to Belgium for prostitution and other kinds of forced labor. A United Nations human-rights report that was issued in 2010 proposed that Belgium provide more assistance to victims of human trafficking and that it change its laws to ensure that residency permits are issued to such persons whether or not they choose to cooperate with court authorities.

Children under 15 are not permitted to work in Belgium; those between 15 and 18 are allowed to do part-time work and to work full-time during school vacations; waivers can be granted for children working in, for example, entertainment. In larger cities some children are exploited by organized gangs of beggars.

There is a minimum wage; the work day is eight hours, and the work week is 38 hours. These and other rules regulating work hours, safety, and other issues are enforced by the Employment and Labor Relations Federal Public Service.

=== Canada ===
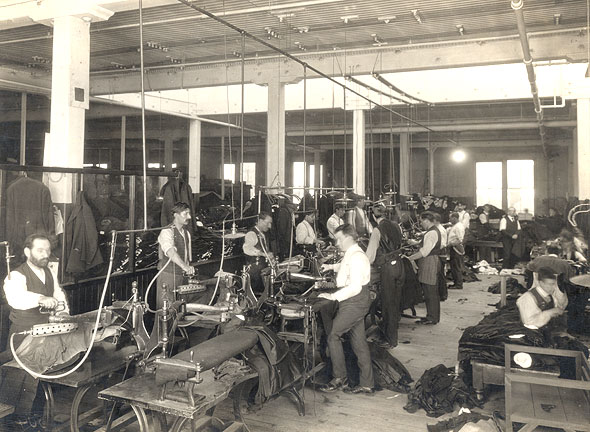
The interior of one of the Eaton's factories in Toronto, Canada

In Canadian law, "labour law" refers to matters connected with unionized workplaces, while "employment law" deals with non-unionized employees.

=== China ===
In China the basic labour laws are the Labour Law of People's Republic of China (1994) and the Labour Contract Law of the People's Republic of China (adopted at the 10th National People's Congress, effective 2008). The administrative regulations enacted by the State Council, the ministerial rules and the judicial explanations of the Supreme People's Court stipulate detailed rules concerning various aspects of employment. The government-controlled All China Federation of Trade Unions is the sole legal labour union. Strikes are formally legal, but in practice are discouraged.

=== Czech Republic ===
In Czech Republic, the relevant regulation is called the Labour Code (Czech: Zákoník práce). The new labour code of the Czech Republic No.262/2006 Sb., effective from 1 January 2007, superseded the Code of 65/1965.

=== Egypt ===
Egypt's Labour Law No 12 of 2003 and its executive decrees govern legal relationships between employees and employers.

=== France ===
In France, the first labour laws were Waldeck Rousseau's laws passed in 1884. Between 1936 and 1938 the Popular Front enacted a law mandating 12 days (2 weeks) each year of paid vacation for workers, and a law limited the work week to 40 hours, excluding overtime. The Grenelle agreements negotiated on 25 and 26 May in the middle of the May 1968 crisis, reduced the working week to 44 hours and created trade union sections in each enterprise. The minimum wage was increased by 25%.

In 2000, Lionel Jospin's government enacted the 35-hour workweek, reduced from 39 hours. Five years later, conservative prime minister Dominique de Villepin enacted the New Employment Contract (CNE). Addressing the demands of employers asking for more flexibility in French labour laws, the CNE sparked criticism from trade unions and opponents claiming it favoured contingent work. In 2006, he then attempted to pass the First Employment Contract (CPE) through a vote by emergency procedure, but that was met by students and unions' protests. President Jacques Chirac finally had no choice but to repeal it.

=== Poland ===
In Poland, the main act on the Labour Law is the Polish Labour Code from 1974. Since its introduction into the legal system the act is constantly being adapted and updated to the current reality of the labour market in Poland. The basic form of employment in Poland is an employment contract, which can be concluded for a probation period, a definite period of time or an indefinite period of time. The Polish Labour Code provides regulations on employee benefits, annual leave, termination of the employment contract, discrimination in the workplace, disciplinary liability and many other employment-related issues. Polish employment contracts can be terminated in many ways, e.g. in a disciplinary mode, by a termination with a notice period or by a mutual agreement of both parts.

Labor law in Poland is closely related to the social insurance system, which is crucial for both employees and employers. According to Polish regulations, employers are obligated to register employees with ZUS (Social Insurance Institution) and to pay contributions for pension, disability, accident, sickness, and health insurance. These insurances provide workers with protection in case of illness, work-related accidents, and guarantee benefits for old age or in case of incapacity to work. Thanks to these regulations, employees can enjoy a wide range of social and economic rights, which are an important aspect of social and financial stability in the country.

=== India ===
Over fifty national and many more state-level laws govern work in India. So for instance, a permanent worker can be terminated only for proven misconduct or habitual absence. In the Uttam Nakate case, the Bombay High Court held that dismissing an employee for repeated sleeping on the factory floor was illegal – the decision was overturned by the Supreme Court of India two decades later. In 2008, the World Bank criticized the complexity, lack of modernization and flexibility in Indian regulations.

In the Constitution of India from 1950, articles 14–16, 19(1)(c), 23–24, 38, and 41-43A directly concern labour rights. Article 14 states everyone should be equal before the law, article 15 specifically says the state should not discriminate against citizens, and article 16 extends a right of "equality of opportunity" for employment or appointment under the state. Article 19(1)(c) gives everyone a specific right "to form associations or unions". Article 23 prohibits all trafficking and forced labour, while article 24 prohibits child labour under 14 years old in a factory, mine or "any other hazardous employment".

Articles 38–39, and 41-43A, like all rights listed in Part IV of the Constitution are not enforceable by courts, rather than creating an aspirational "duty of the State to apply these principles in making laws".[3] The original justification for leaving such principles unenforceable by the courts was that democratically accountable institutions ought to be left with discretion, given the demands they could create on the state for funding from general taxation, although such views have since become controversial. Article 38(1) says that in general the state should "strive to promote the welfare of the people" with a "social order in which justice, social, economic and political, shall inform all the institutions of national life.

Article 38(2) says the state should "minimise the inequalities in income" and based on all other statuses. Article 41 creates a "right to work", which the National Rural Employment Guarantee Act 2005 attempts to put into practice. Article 42 requires the state to "make provision for securing just and human conditions of work and for maternity relief". Article 43 says workers should have the right to a living wage and "conditions of work ensuring a decent standard of life". Article 43A, inserted by the Forty-second Amendment of the Constitution of India in 1976,[4] creates a constitutional right to codetermination by requiring the state to legislate to "secure the participation of workers in the management of undertakings". The recently released New Labour Codes 2022 mentions that organizations can convert 9-hour shifts to 12-hour shifts and provide three days of leave every week. The 4-day workweek policy will be effective from 1 July 2022.

In Ancient India, several measures were introduced to safeguard workers, such as in terms of wages and social security.

Also read: Labour Reforms by Government of India Ministry of Labour & Employment (https://labour.gov.in/labour-reforms)

=== Indonesia ===
Indonesia essentially rebuilt its labour law system in the early 2000s following regime change and with support of the ILO. These three statutes constituted a new legislative framework for industrial relations:

1. Law No. 21 of 2000 on Trade Unions, which allowed free unionization; and

2. Law No. 13 of 2003 on Manpower, which legislated other minimum labour rights; and

3. Law No. 2 of 2004 on Industrial Relations Disputes Settlement, established a new industrial relations dispute resolution system.

=== Iran ===
Iran has not ratified the two basic Conventions of the International Labour Organization on freedom of association and collective bargaining and one abolishing child labour.

=== Lithuania ===
Lithuania began the work of rewriting the employment laws in 1996 and the Labour Code (Lithuanian: Darbo Kodeksas) bill was completed in 2001. It was heavily inspired by the Hungarian, Czech as well Polish laws and incorporated the vast majority of the European Union regulations. The new labour code was formally enacted in 2002. Another major reform of the labour code was implemented in 2016, bringing more flexibility, yet balancing it with protection for employees. The Labour Code 2016 formally entered force on 1 July 2017.

=== Mexico ===
Mexican labour law reflects the historic interrelation between the state and the Confederation of Mexican Workers. The confederation is officially aligned with the Institutional Revolutionary Party (the Institutional Revolutionary Party, or PRI). While the law promises workers the right to strike and to organize, in practice it is difficult or impossible for independent unions to organize.

=== Singapore ===
Singapore has a "minimum legal obligation" rule which applies to employment contracts and in other fields of contracting, and limits damages payments for breach of contract. The rule applies in wrongful dismissal cases: generally, its effect would be to limit an employee's damages to the minimum notice period under which the employer could properly have dismissed the employee. Various "general principles" have been identified which apply to the summary dismissal of employees on grounds of misconduct.

=== South Africa ===
South African labour law is regulated by the Department of Employment and Labour and is based on the Labour Relations Act (LRA) 66 of 1995, which regulates the relationship between and rights of employers, employees and trade unions. The LRA also gives effect to Section 23 of the Constitution. The LRA lays out the procedures for dispute resolution via the Commission for Conciliation, Mediation and Arbitration (CCMA) and establishes the Labour Court and Labour Appeal Court as superior courts with exclusive jurisdiction to decide matters arising from the Act.

The Labour Relations Act also regulates the issue of fairness, not only in termination but during employment. In 1998, most of the laws on unfair labour practices were removed from the Labour Relations Act and placed into the newly formed Employment Equity Act (EEA). The EEA also deals with issues such as fairness regarding a worker's human immunodeficiency virus (HIV) status or disability, as well as the issue of affirmative action.

Prior to 1995, an employee could be dismissed in terms of the contract of employment, which could permit dismissal for any reason. Since 1995, an employee may be dismissed only for misconduct, operational reasons, or incapacity, provided that procedural fairness is maintained. The Labour Relations Act 1995 is a pivotal piece of legislation, as it recognises the need for fast and easy access to justice in labour disputes. The Industrial Court had the status of a High Court and was therefore not accessible to all labourers.

The Basic Conditions of Employment Act (BCEA), the Health and Safety Act and the Skills Development Act, must be read with the EEA. The Skills Development Act provides that a small percentage of a labourer's salary must be contributed to the Department of Labour, enabling certain workshops to be run which are designed to develop skills.

=== Sweden ===
In Sweden many workplace issues such as working hours, minimum wage and right to overtime compensation are regulated through collective bargaining agreements in accordance with the Swedish model of self-regulation, i.e. regulation by the labour market parties themselves in contrast to state regulation (labour laws). A notable exception is the Employment Protection act which regulates employment contracts and extensive employees' rights to employment under certain conditions.

=== Switzerland ===
The labour law of Switzerland covers all standards governing the employment of some kind. The regulation of the employment by private employers is largely harmonized at the federal level, while public-sector employment still prevails a variety of cantonal laws. In particular, the civil standardization is distributed to a variety of laws. Of greater importance, particularly the new Federal Constitution of 1999, the Code of Obligations, the Labour Code as well as in the public sector, the Federal Personnel Act.

=== United Kingdom ===
The Factory Acts (first one in 1802, then 1833) and the 1823 Master and Servant Act were the first laws regulating labour relations in the United Kingdom. Most employment law before 1960 was based upon contract law. Since then there has been a significant expansion primarily due to movements for equality and the legal requirements imposed by the UK's former membership of the European Union. UK employment law comes from Acts of Parliament, secondary legislation (made by a Secretary of State under an Act of Parliament), case law (developed by various courts), and retained Community law following the UK's departure from the EU.

The first significant expansion was the Equal Pay Act 1970, brought in to try to ensure pay equality for women in the workplace. Since 1997, changes in UK employment law include enhanced maternity and paternity rights, the introduction of a National Minimum Wage and the Working Time Regulations, which covers working time, rest breaks and the right to paid annual leave. Discrimination law has been tightened, with protection from discrimination now available on the grounds of age, religion or belief and sexual orientation as well as gender, race and disability.

=== United States ===
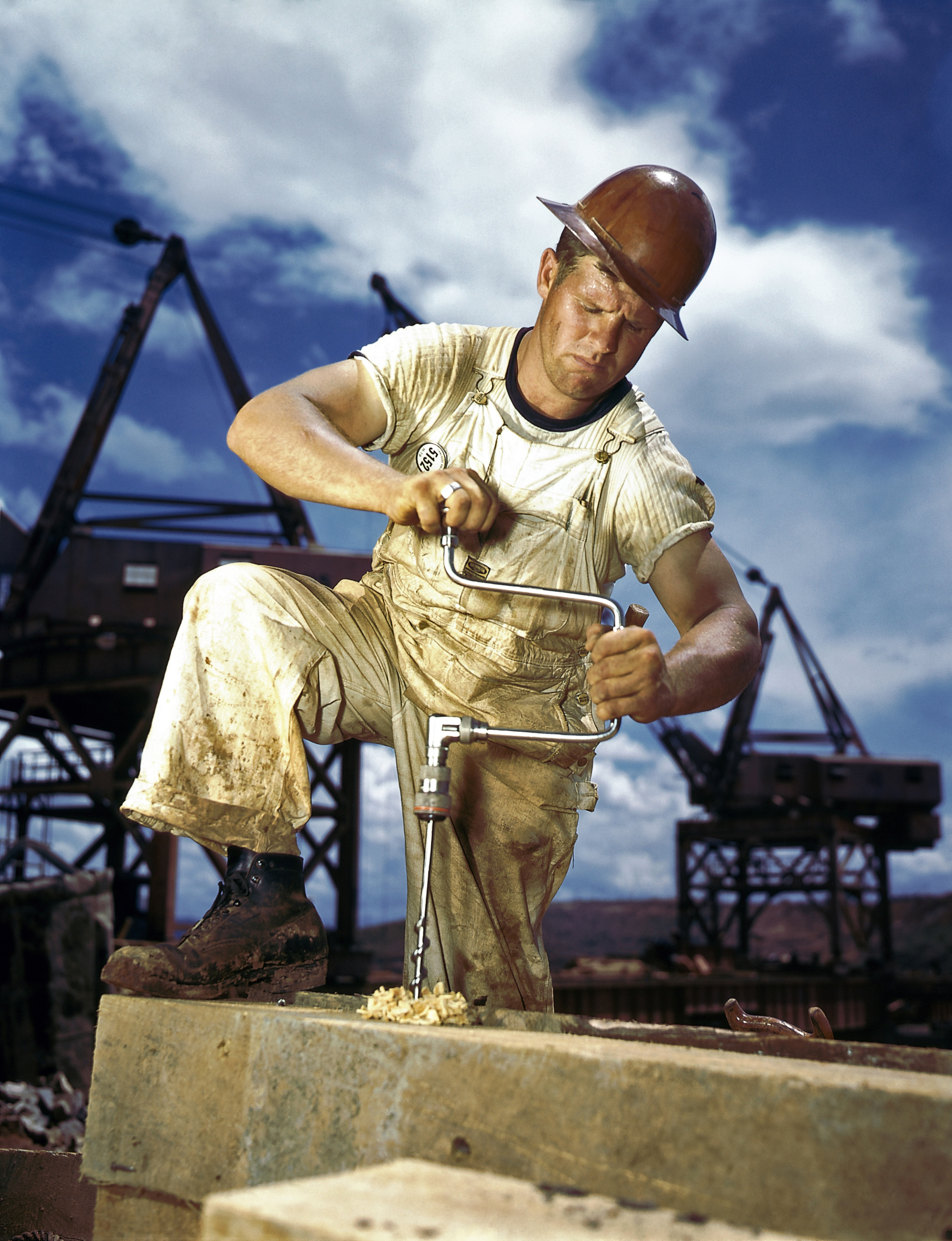
An American builder

The Fair Labor Standards Act of 1938 set the maximum standard work week to 44 hours. In 1950 this was reduced to 40 hours. A green card entitles immigrants to work, without requirement a separate work permit. Despite the 40-hour standard maximum work week, some lines of work require more than 40 hours. For example, farm workers may work over 72 hours a week, followed by at least 24 hours off. Exceptions to the break period exist for certain harvesting employees, such as those involved in harvesting grapes, tree fruits and cotton.

Professionals, clerical (administrative assistants), technical, and mechanical employees cannot be terminated for refusing to work more than 72 hours in a work week. These ceilings, combined with a competitive job market, often motivate American workers to work more hours. American workers on average take the fewest days off of any developed country.

The Fifth and Fourteenth Amendments of the United States Constitution limit the power of the federal and state governments to discriminate. The private sector is not directly constrained by the Constitution, but several laws, particularly the Civil Rights Act of 1964, limit the private sector discrimination against certain groups. The Fifth Amendment has an explicit requirement that the Federal Government not deprive individuals of "life, liberty, or property", without due process of law and an implicit guarantee that each person receive equal protection of the law.

The Fourteenth Amendment explicitly prohibits states from violating an individual's rights of due process and equal protection. Equal protection limits the State and Federal governments' power to discriminate in their employment practices by treating employees, former employees, or job applicants unequally because of membership in a group, like a race, religion or sex. Due process protection requires that employees have a fair procedural process before they are terminated if the termination is related to a "liberty", like the right to free speech, or a property interest.

The National Labor Relations Act, enacted in 1935 as part of the New Deal legislation, guarantees workers the right to form unions and engage in collective bargaining.

The Age Discrimination in Employment Act of 1967 prohibits employment discrimination based on age with respect to employees 40 years of age or older.

Title VII of the Civil Rights Act is the principal federal statute with regard to employment discrimination, prohibiting unlawful employment discrimination by public and private employers, labour organizations, training programmes and employment agencies based on race or colour, religion, sex and national origin. Retaliation is also prohibited by Title VII against any person for opposing any practice forbidden by statute, or for making a charge, testifying, assisting, or participating in a proceeding under the statute. The Civil Rights Act of 1991 expanded the damages available to Title VII cases and granted Title VII plaintiffs the right to jury trial.

=== USSR ===
The Soviet Union codified labour codes with the KZoT (Russian: КЗОТ).

=== Halakhah (Jewish religious law) ===
The beginnings of halakhic labour law are in the Bible, in which two commandments refer to this subject: the law against delayed wages (Lev. 19:13; Deut. 24:14–15) and the worker's right to eat the employer's crops (Deut. 23:25–26). The Talmudic law—in which labour law is called "laws of worker hiring"—elaborates on many more aspects of employment relations, mainly in Tractate Baba Metzi'a. In some issues the Talamud, following the Tosefta, refers the parties to the customary law: "All is as the custom of the region [postulates]".

Modern halakhic labour law developed very slowly. Rabbi Israel Meir Hacohen (the Hafetz Hayim) interprets the worker's right for timely payment in a tendency that clearly favours the employee over the employer, but does not refer to new questions of employment relations. Only in the 1920s we find the first halakhic authority to tackle the questions of trade unions (that could easily be anchored in Talmudic law) and the right of strike (which is quite problematic in terms of Talmudic law).

Rabbis A.I Kook and B.M.H. Uziel tend to corporatist settling of labour conflicts, while Rabbi Moshe Feinstein adopts the liberal democratic collective bargaining model. Since the 1940s the halakhic literature on labour law was enriched by books and articles that referred to growing range of questions and basically adopted the liberal democratic approach.

== See also ==
- Decent work
- Distributism
- Economic democracy
- Employee benefits
- Employment contract
- Family economics
- Family wage
- Immigration law
- Industrial relations
- Job guarantee
- Journal of Individual Employment Rights
- Labour inspectorate
- Labour market flexibility
- Labour movement
- Legal working age
- Living wage
- Labor market
- Labor rights
- Labor law
- Maximum wage
- Minimum wage
- Occupational burnout
- Occupational safety and health
- Occupational licensing
- Protective laws (on gender)
- Positive rights
- Precarious work
- Profit sharing
- Right-to-work law
- Ship's articles
- Social policy
- Trade Boards Act 1909
- Union organizer
- Vicarious liability
- Weekends
- WorkChoices
- Working poor
- Workplace Fairness
