= Labor rights =

Workplace and human rights statuses

Labor rights or workers' rights are both legal rights and human rights relating to labor relations between workers and employers. These rights are codified in national and international labor and employment law. In general, these rights influence working conditions in the relations of employment. One of the most prominent is the right to freedom of association, otherwise known as the right to organize. Workers organized in trade unions exercise the right to collective bargaining to improve working conditions.

== Labor background ==
Throughout history, workers claiming some sort of right have attempted to pursue their interests. During the Middle Ages, the Peasants' Revolt in England expressed demand for better wages and working conditions. One of the leaders of the revolt, John Ball, famously argued that people were born equal saying, "When Adam delved and Eve span, who was then the gentleman?" Laborers often appealed to traditional rights. For instance, English peasants fought against the enclosure movement, which took traditionally communal lands and made them private.

The British Parliament passed the Factory Act 1833 which stated that children under the age of 9 could not work, children aged 9–13 could only work 8 hours a day, and children aged 14–18 could only work for 12 hours a day.

Labor rights are a relatively new addition to the modern corpus of human rights. The modern concept of labor rights dates to the 19th century after the creation of labor unions following the industrialization processes.

== Core labor standards ==
Identified by the International Labour Organization (ILO) in the Declaration on Fundamental Principles and Rights at Work, core labor standards are "widely recognized to be of particular importance". They are universally applicable, regardless of whether the relevant conventions have been ratified, the level of development of a country or cultural values. These standards are composed of qualitative, not quantitative, standards and do not establish a particular level of working conditions, wages or health and safety standards. They are not intended to undermine the comparative advantage that developing countries may hold. Core labor standards are important human rights and are recognized in widely ratified international human rights instruments including the Convention on the Rights of the Child (CROC), the most widely ratified human rights treaty with 193 parties, and the ICCPR with 160 parties. They have been incorporated into different provisions that are related to labor in soft law instruments such as the UN's Global Compact, the OECD Guidelines, and the ILO MNE Declaration.

The core labor standards are:

- Freedom of association: workers are able to join trade unions that are independent of government and employer influence.
- The right to collective bargaining: workers may negotiate with employers collectively, as opposed to individually.
- The prohibition of all forms of forced labor: includes security from prison labor and slavery and prevents workers from being forced to work under duress.
- Elimination of the worst forms of child labor: implementing a minimum working age and certain working condition requirements for children.
- Non-discrimination in employment: equal pay for equal work.

Very few ILO member countries have ratified all of these conventions due to domestic constraints yet as these rights are also recognized in the UDHR, and form a part of customary international law they are committed to respecting these rights. For a discussion on the incorporation of these core labor rights into the mechanisms of the World Trade Organization, see Labour standards in the World Trade Organization. There are many other issues outside of this core, in the UK employee rights include the right to employment particulars, an itemized pay statement, a disciplinary process at which they have the right to be accompanied, daily breaks, rest breaks, paid holidays, and more.

== Labor rights issues by topics ==
Aside from the right to organize, labor movements have campaigned on various other issues that may be said to relate to labor rights. The labor movement began to improve the working conditions of the workers. Dating back to 1768 the first strike of the New York journeyman tailors protested a wage reduction. This marked the beginning of the movement. Approaching the 19th century, labor unions were formed to improve the working conditions for all of workers. They fought for better wages, reasonable hours, and safer working conditions. The labor movement led efforts to stop child labor, give health benefits, and provide aid to workers who were injured or retired. The following are explained more in the following sections.

=== Hour limits ===
Many labor movement campaigns have to do with limiting hours in the workplace. 19th century labor movements campaigned for an eight-hour day. Worker advocacy groups have also sought to limit work hours, making a working week of 40 hours or less standard in many countries. A 35-hour workweek was established in France in 2000, although this standard has been considerably weakened since then. Workers may agree with employers to work for longer, but the extra hours are payable overtime. In the European Union the working week is limited to a maximum of 48 hours including overtime (see also Working Time Directive 2003).

=== Workplace conditions ===
Labor rights advocates have worked to improve workplace conditions that meet established standards. During the Progressive Era, the United States began workplace reforms, which received publicity boosts from Upton Sinclair's The Jungle and events such as the 1911 Triangle Shirtwaist Factory fire. Labor advocates and other groups often criticize production facilities with poor working conditions as sweatshops and occupational health hazards and campaign for better labor practices and recognition of workers' rights throughout the world.

=== Safety and social sustainability ===
Recent initiatives in the field of sustainability have included a focus on social sustainability, which includes promoting workers' rights and safe working conditions, prevention of human trafficking, and elimination of illegal child labor from the sustainably sourced products and services. Organizations such as the U.S. Department of Labor and Department of State have released studies on products that have been identified as using child labor and industries using or funded by human trafficking. Labor rights are defined internationally by sources such as the Norwegian Agency for Public Management and eGovernment (DIFI) and the International Finance Corporation performance standards.

=== Living wage ===
The labor movement pushes for guaranteed minimum wage laws, and there are continuing negotiations about increases to the minimum wage. However, opponents see minimum wage laws as limiting employment opportunities for unskilled and entry-level workers.

The benefits and costs of foreign direct investments on labor rights are often argued. Payton and Woo's study shows that even though "workers may not see drastic increases in minimum wages but they will benefit marginally from better enforcement of existing minimum wage laws or other protections granted in law, gradually improving overall working conditions, as more FDI flows in."

=== Globalization ===
In March 2004, the World Commission on the Social Dimension of Globalization issued a report called "A Fair Globalization: Creating Opportunities for All". The report acknowledges how potential globalization can affect labor rights. Reforming globalization will require cooperation not only within the country but also at the global level. It suggests political authorities to "renew their attention to global solidarity".

Workers' rights advocates have been concerned with how globalization can impact labor rights in different countries. Some international agencies and global corporations see strong enforcement will limit a country's economic growth. As companies outsource their work to workers from lower-wage countries, governments will relax their regulations to attract businesses. As a result, poor countries implement a lower labor rights standard to compete with other countries. Layna Mosley's study shows that collective labor rights have declined since the recent global expansion started. By having multiple countries sign agreements and treaties, labor rights are able to be protected across the globe. However, some countries sign it even though they are not planning to follow the rules. Therefore, there might be room for labor rights practices to suffer.

However, some argued that globalization can improve labor rights enforcement by responding to other country's demands. Governments will act in their national interests, so when an important trading country urges for strong labor rights enforcement, they will act accordingly.

== Labor rights issues by demographics ==
=== Child labor ===
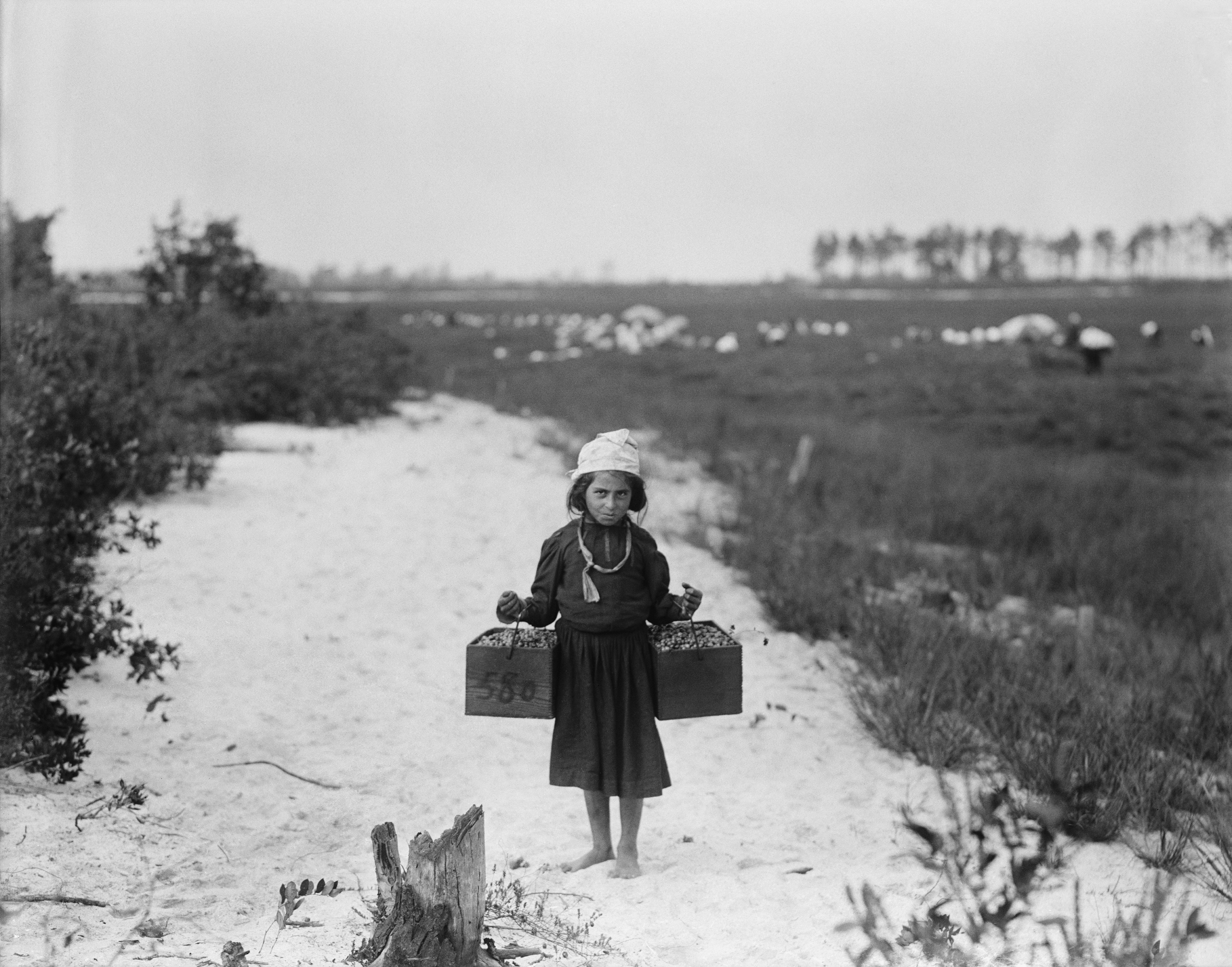
11Rose Biodo, 1216 Annan St., Philadelphia. 10 years old. Working 3 summers. Minds baby and carries berries, two pecks at a time. Whites Bog, Brown Mills, N.J. This is the fourth week of school and the people here expect to remain two weeks more. Witness E. F. Brown. Location: Browns Mills, New Jersey.

Labor rights advocates have also worked to combat child labor. They see child labor as exploitative, and often economically damaging. Child labor opponents often argue that working children are deprived of an education. In 1948 and then again in 1989, the United Nations declared that children have a right to social protection.

It is hard for children to fight for their basic rights, especially in the workplace. They are often under-treated. Employers take advantage of child labor because they lack the ability to bargain collectively and compromise to work at an unpleasant workplace. Almost 95% of child labor occurs in developing countries. An example of an industry in which instances of child labor lead to severe injury or death that have been noted are cobalt mining in the DRC as well as copper mining in Zambia, where children were reported to be participating in all forms of mining at the expense of their education. There is a growing concern that the rising demand for resources that involve child labor for industries such as the production of electric vehicle batteries, will only increase labor rights violations. In India and Pakistan, children work long hours in various industries because of the debt their parents incurred. Poor families sometimes rely on their kids' income to pay bills. In Egypt, about 1.5 million kids under 14 years old are working even though there are child-protective labor laws.

==== Child labor in the United States ====
In the United States, the Fair Labor Standards Act of 1938 (FLSA) restricts the employment of children. The FLSA defines the minimum age for employment to 14 years for non-agricultural jobs with restrictions on hours, restricts the hours for youth under the age of 16, and prohibits the employment of children under the age of 18 in occupations deemed hazardous by the Secretary of Labor.

In 2007, Massachusetts updated its child labor laws that required all minors to have work permits.

=== Pregnant employees ===
The Employment Protection Consolidation Act (EPCA) has established four fundamental regulations for women's employment rights. Firstly, there is the provision of Statutory Maternity Pay, which ensures that a minimum payment is made during the leave period. Secondly, there is the right to maternity leave, which guarantees that women can take time off work and return to their job afterward. Additionally, women have the right to be reinstated to their original position. Finally, the EPCA has reinforced unfair dismissal rights.

=== Migrant workers ===
Legal migrant workers are sometimes abused. For instance, migrants have faced a number of alleged abuses in the United Arab Emirates (including Dubai). Human Rights Watch lists several problems including "nonpayment of wages, extended working hours without overtime compensation, unsafe working environments resulting in death and injury, squalid living conditions in labor camps, and withholding of passports and travel documents by employers. Despite laws against the practice, employers confiscate migrant workers' passports. Without their passports, workers cannot switch jobs or return home. These workers have little recourse for labor abuses, but conditions have been improving. Labor and social welfare minister Ali bin Abdullah al-Kaabi has undertaken a number of reforms to help improve labor practices in his country.

The United Arab Emirates was condemned in a report issued in April 2021 by the Democracy Centre for Transparency calling out the nation for abuse and discrimination against foreigners and expatriates by Emirati citizens. According to DCT, foreigners and expatriates in the UAE are often subjected to gender and wage discrimination, racialization, trafficking, and forced labor. As per the research conducted by the DCT, these issues remain unreported due to the threat and intimidation from their employers in the form of job loss or fabricated criminal charges. The discrimination and abuse have reportedly continued despite the easing of the Kafala system in the Emirate. The DCT concluded its report urging the UAE to address the issues and put an end to the racial hierarchy and discrimination against non-citizens.

Koelnmesse, the company responsible for managing the pavilion representing Germany at the Expo 2020 reportedly signed an agreement with the Emirati Transguard Group for laundry, cleaning, and security services. Rights groups claim that during the signing of a framework agreement between the two firms, evidence assuring human rights due diligence was overlooked. It is said that the firm withheld the passports and wages of the workers earning relatively lesser than the minimum wage and terminated them from the service without notice.

In neighboring countries such as Qatar, there is a similar problem. Qatar has received a lot of criticism over the way it treats its workers, including those that have worked on FIFA World Cup projects.

The right to equal treatment, regardless of gender, origin and appearance, religion, sexual orientation, is also seen by many as a type of labor right. Discrimination in the workplace is illegal in many countries, though some see the wage gap between genders and other groups to still be prevalent.

=== Undocumented workers ===
Many migrant workers are not getting basic labor rights mainly because they do not speak the local language, regardless of legal status. Some have noticed that they are not getting the correct amount of money on their paycheck while others are underpaid.

==== Undocumented workers in the United States ====
The National Labor Relations Act recognizes undocumented laborers as employees. However, the supreme court case Hoffman Plastic Compounds, Inc. v. NLRB established that backpay could not be awarded to unlawfully fired undocumented employees due to the Immigration Reform and Control Act of 1986. In this court decision, it was also stated that the U.S. would support FLSA and MSPA, without regard to whether or not someone is documented. Undocumented workers also still have legal protection against discrimination based on national origin. The decision of the Hoffman supreme court case has primarily affected undocumented laborers by preventing them from getting backpay and/or reinstatement.

While no undocumented individual is technically able to work in the United States legally, undocumented workers make up 5% of the workforce. In the U.S., people who were born outside of the country tend to work in riskier jobs and have a higher chance of encountering death on the job. The low-wage sectors, which many undocumented people work in, have the highest rates of wage and hour violation. Estimates claim that 31% of undocumented people work in service jobs. Restaurant work in particular has a 12% rate of undocumented workers.

Undocumented people can and have joined labor unions, and are even credited by a 2008 dissertation for "reinvigorating" the labor movement. Because the NLRA protects undocumented workers, it protects their right to organize. However, the NLRA excludes workers that are agricultural, domestic, independent contractors, governmental, or related to their employers.

However, labor unions are not necessarily welcoming of immigrant workers. Within unions, there have been internal struggles, such as when Los Angeles immigrant janitors reorganized service workers. Being a part of the union does not necessarily address all the needs of immigrant workers, and thus winning power within the union is the first step for immigrant workers to address their needs.

Immigrant workers often mobilize beyond unions, by campaigning in their communities on intersectional issues of immigration, discrimination, and police misconduct.

=== Unionized workers ===
Labor unions formed throughout the industries. Labor unions in the crafts discovered difficulty in forming labor unions at different skill levels. These skill groups often got divided into racial and sexist ways. In 1895, the white-only International Association of Machinists affiliated with the American Federation of Labor (AFL), which was founded in 1881. Entering the 20th century African Americans moved from the South into the North only to find that there was discrimination in economic opportunities. Racial stereotypes were used to divide the working class and create segregation. This eventually led to the creation of black codes and Jim Crow laws to limit the ability of African Americans to create a living for themselves. The Jim Crow laws passed in the 1800s were laws that forbade African Americans from living in white neighborhoods, along with segregation in public places. these were enforced for public pools, phone booths, hospitals, asylums, jails and residential homes for the elderly and handicapped and more.

== Measurement of labor rights ==
There are several indices, produced by various organizations, that measure labor rights .Some focus on collective bargaining and freedom of association including in datasets produced by the International Trade Union Confederation (ITUC), the International Labour Organization (ILO), and Penn State. Others, such as data produced by the V-Dem Institute and UCLA's World Policy Analysis Center focus on other components such as employment discrimination, child labor, and forced labor.

The ITUC produces the Global Rights Index on an annual basis which rates "countries depending on their compliance with collective labor rights and document violations by governments and employers of internationally recognized rights." The ILO produces the data for Sustainable Development Goal 8.8.2, which measures the "Level of national compliance with labor rights (freedom of association and collective bargaining) based on International Labour Organization (ILO) textual sources and national legislation, by sex and migrant status. In the past, Penn State's Center for Global Workers’ Rights has produced a set of labor rights indicators which use a similar methodology to the ILO, but have wider country coverage.

The V-Dem Institute produces a wide range of data on civil rights and democracy. This includes data on the prevalence of forced labor and data on civil society organizations, including trade unions. UCLA's World Policy Analysis Center maintains a database on a range of global legal standards including women's rights, disability rights, child labor, and employment discrimination.

== See also ==
- Decent work
- International Labour Organization
- Economic, social and cultural rights
- Industrial democracy
- Institute for Global Labour and Human Rights
- International Labour Organization
- International Labor Rights Forum
- Job guarantee
- Journal of Workplace Rights
- Labor rights in American meatpacking industry
- Labour Day
- Labour law
- Occupational safety and health
- Right to work
- Social clause
- Socialism
- Strike action
- Syndicalism
- Smart contract: can be used in employment contracts
- Union organizer
- Worker cooperative
- Workers' council
- Workers' right to access the toilet
- Workplace democracy
