= Contrat nouvelle embauche =

French employment contract

A contrat nouvelle embauche (abbreviated CNE), known as a new employment contract, new recruitment contract or new-job contract in English is a French employment contract proposed by Prime Minister Dominique de Villepin (UMP) which came into force by ordinance on August 2, 2010. The measure was enacted by the prime minister after he was authorized by Parliament to take legislative measures to stimulate employment. Unlike the later First Employment Contract (CPE) which was repealed in 2010 (soon after its enactment), after protests the CNE has been used as a job contract despite opposition from trade unions.

== Background ==
The CNE was created by the French government as part of its June 2005 Emergency Employment Plan to fight France's high unemployment. The plan aimed to create jobs by giving flexibility to small businesses, since many employers blame their inability to hire on rigid French labour laws. One of the most frequent claims by employers and the employers' union (MEDEF) has been inflexibility regarding layoffs.

== Clauses ==
=== Small companies ===
The CNE applies only to new permanent employees, of any age, in firms with no more than 20 employees.

=== First-two-years contract-termination clause ===
The contract allows employers to terminate employment without providing a specific justification during the first two years of employment, after which legal justification is required. The flexibility clause was a major break with the protective conditions usually applying to long-term job contracts in France. Under the usual long-term job contract, an employer needs to justify the firing of an employee. If an employer terminates the contract during its first two years, they must provide advance notice of two weeks to one month. An employee may terminate the contract with no advance notice during its first two years. After the first two years the contract is identical to the existing long-term contract, with protective measures for the employee. The CNE also limits to 12 months the period during which an employee can contest their firing before labor-law courts; in ordinary contracts, the period is 30 years.

=== Burden of proof in litigation ===
Under normal long-term labour contracts, an employer bears the burden of proof as the defendant; if the plaintiff is the fired employee, the employer must justify the firing. This is known as the reversal of burden of proof, and is based on the legal justification provided to fire the employee.

This 1973 law was enacted under Pierre Messmer's prime ministry during Valéry Giscard d'Estaing's presidency. Pierre Mesmer had succeeded Jacques Chaban-Delmas, who after May 1968 had a "new society project" aiming to modernize France. This included social measures, although Giscard d'Estaing and the ministers supported economic liberalism.

Although at first the CNE said that "no motive" had to be given during the first two years, a Conseil d'Etat ruling in October 2005 imposed such a motive in litigation. If a plaintiff (employee) alleges they have been fired due to discrimination based on religion, political opinion, physical disability, age or sexual orientation, the Conseil d'Etat ruled to reverse the burden of proof to the employer's side.

For other claims, the burden of proof remains on the employee side. Avoiding the risk of court procedures is a key issue behind the CNE. With the similar CPE contract discussions, opponents (unions and opposition leaders) have supported the reversal of burden of proof to the employer in all employment cases.

== Support ==
=== Improvement through flexibility ===
According to Prime Minister Dominique de Villepin, easier firing would make small companies less reluctant to hire new employees. This idea is not new; employers and economists have been asking for more flexibility, and consider that globalization makes protective labour law unaffordable. "The issue of flexibility must be addressed, and quickly", said the leader of CGPME (France's association of SMEs) and Laurence Parisot, leader of MEDEF (France's major employers' union). MEDEF and CGPME expected the government to push for stronger reforms.

The two-year period gives flexibility to small companies, who will be able to hire without the probation-period deadline of long-term contracts. The "no justification" clause is a key issue, since "employers often also argue that the tribunal is heavily prejudiced in favour of the employee". The CNE is in line with International Monetary Fund (IMF) advice to "introduce flexibility in the French labour market", and the IMF called CNES a "first step" towards reform. After the First Employment Contract was discontinued, a survey showed that 57 percent of small employers feared that the CNE might also be scrapped.

=== Improved flexibility, reduced unemployment ===
The prime minister claimed that the CNE was a "necessary measure" to tackle unemployment, since "one third of those recruited would not have found jobs [without the CNE]". Nearly 500,000 CNEs have been signed, according to Dominique de Villepin in May 2006, demonstrating that small businesses favor the contract. According to supporters, the CNE's primary advantage is the creation of jobs which would not have existed without the law; this indicates that improved employer flexibility helps reduce unemployment. Estimates of the number of jobs created because of CNEs vary according to sources, from 80,000 per year (INSEE National Institute of Statistics extrapolations) to 29 percent of all CNEs (Ifop, December 2005).

A June 2006 Les Échos study is the latest available study, and the first one based on actual figures. According to the study 440,000 CNE contracts were signed between August 2005 and April 2006, 10 percent (44,000) of which would not have existed under existing job contracts. This is significant, since there were only 50,000 private-sector jobs created in 2005. The study also showed that an additional 20 percent of jobs would have been delayed without a CNE, demonstrating employers' reluctance to hire under existing long-term contracts.

=== Employee benefits ===
One consequence of the two-year probation is flexibility for employees, who are free to change jobs during their first two years without the usual one- to three-month advance notice required by long-term contracts. The 2006 Les Echos study demonstrated that more CNE contracts were terminated by employees (45 percent) than by employers (38 percent).

== Opposition ==
The CNE law passed quietly in August 2005, with less opposition than that sparked by the CPE since it applies to non-unionized businesses. However, its repeal was a primary goal of demonstrations held on October 4, 2005. After the April 2006 cancellation of the First Employment Contract, unions have increased pressure to cancel this contract; they contend that it creates precarious work for employees, endangering job security.

Opponents of the law argue that the new "flexibility" negates labour laws which the workers' movement secured after decades of struggle. They argue that it may be difficult to counter the inversion of the burden of the proof introduced by the new contract (for example, if an employee is fired because of psychological pressure such as sexual harassment). In contrast to a CDI contract, CNE employees are at a disadvantage in obtaining credit or housing. This claim, however, has been denied by banks. After the February 20, 2006 judgment (see below), the CGT trade union declared that "the magistrate has put in evidence the embezzlement of the CNE and the abusive character of the rupture": "it is the principle itself of the CNE which allows such illegitimate use: by suppressing the guaranties which protect against abusive firing, the CNE favorize all arbitrary bosses' behavior".

On April 28, 2006 a local labour court (conseil des prud'hommes) ruled the two-year "fire at will" period "unreasonable" and contrary to convention umber 158 of the International Labour Organization (ratified by France), which states that an employee "cannot be fired without any legitimate motive...before offering him the possibility to defend himself".

== Impact ==
In April 2006, estimates of the number of CNE employees varied from 320,000 (ACOSS governmental numbers) to 400,000 (Les Echos economical newspaper's numbers). According to IFOP, a polling company headed by Laurence Parisot (leader of the MEDEF employers' union), 29 percent of CNE jobs would not have existed without the CNE (in other words, from 106,000 to 133,000 CNE jobs would not have been filled during its first seven months). This poll was used to confirm Villepin's claim that "a third of the jobs" would not have been created otherwise. This contradicted an INSEE (National Institute of Statistics) estimate that it would create (at most) 40,000 to 80,000 jobs a year. In May 2006, Prime Minister de Villepin said that "almost 500,000 contracts" were signed.

In June 2006, Echos released the first CNE study based on actual figures. According to this study:

- 440,000 CNE contracts were signed from August 2005 to April 2006.
- 10 percent (44,000) were for jobs which would not have existed without the CNE.
- The 44,000 jobs compares with the 50,000 long-term private-sector jobs created in France in 2005.
- Over 11% of contracts were cancelled within the two-year probation period.
- More CNEs were cancelled by employees (45 percent) than by employers (38 percent).

According to Echos, the CNE created nearly as many jobs in 10 months as the private sector did for all of 2005 (about 50,000).

=== INSEE and ACOSS ===
The French National Institute for Statistics (INSEE) calculated a lower number, estimating that CNEs will create a net 10,000 to 20,000 jobs each trimester (40,000 to 80,000 jobs per year). The impact of CNEs has been questioned by Le Canard enchaîné, which quoted the INSEE study, the ANPE's records and trade unions. Since the more-recent First Employment Contract (CPE) was rejected after months of protest, unions have also been trying to cancel the CNE. On the other hand, employers' unions (Medef) consider it a major reform. The Canard Enchaîné said that the governmental ACOSS numbers (400,000 contracts) was an inflated estimate. ACOSS later reduced the figure by 20 percent, to 320,000. According to the ANPE (the Department of Labour), 600 CNEs had been signed by August 19, 2005 (two weeks after its introduction). The Canard Enchaîné considers the number of jobs created (as calculated by INSEE) "a drop in the ocean". Several CNEs were challenged in court. Confronted with multiple reversals of firings because of "abuse of right", "the CGPME, organisation of small employers, gave as instructions to its members to justify from now on ruptures" (i.e. to not implement CNEs). An April 28, 2006 judgment reinstated the CNE.

== Court decisions ==
The CNE has been challenged several times in court. On October 17, 2005 the Conseil d'Etat, France's supreme court, declared the two-year "fire-at-will" period "reasonable" and in accordance with convention 158 of the International Labour Organization. The Conseil d'Etat declared that if a firing is unjustified, "this does not mean that it has no motive, nor that the judge, seized by the employee, shouldn't determine it [the motive of the rupture] nor control it". Other examples of unjustified firing include the firing of pregnant women or sick people, someone with undesirable religious or political opinions, someone who has been harassed (sexually or otherwise), a union representative or someone fired on racial grounds.

In an unprecedented decision, on February 20, 2006 a labour-law court in Longjumeau (Essonne) ordered an employer to pay €17,500 in damages for "abusive rupture of the trial period" and "rupture of the consolidation period" (the two-year "fire-at-will" period). A 51-year-old auto-industry employee had been hired on May 21, 2005 by a small firm (PME) with an ordinary, indeterminate contract (CDI). On August 6, 2005 (two days after the CNE law was enacted) he was fired, and hired by another PME for the same job at the same place with a CNE. On August 30, 2005, he was fired a second time. The CGT claimed that the "CNE favorized arbitrary bosses' behavior".

On April 28, 2006, after the CPE's repeal, the Longjumeau conseil des prud'hommes (labour law court) ruled that the CNE was contrary to international law, "illegitimate" and "without any judicial value". The court considered the two-year "fire at will" period "unreasonable" and contravened convention 158 of the International Labour Organization (ratified by France). The court ruled on the case of Linda de Wee, who had been hired with a CDD (temporary contract) on July 1, 2005 as a secretary. At the end of her six-month term, she was hired by the same employer on January 1, 2006 with a CNE contract. The court redefined the contract as a CDI (permanent contract). CGT trade union leader Bernard Thibault hoped that the decision would mark the end of the controversial contract.

On July 6, 2007, the Court of Appeal of Paris upheld the decision. The International Labour Organization agreed with the French courts in its November 2007 decision (dec-GB.300/20/6), issued at the request of the Force Ouvrière trade union. The French government was asked to ensure "that 'contracts for new employment' can in no case be terminated in the absence of a valid reason".

== See also ==
- Job security
- Precarity
- 2006 youth protests in France
- First Employment Contract
