= Precarity =

Lacking in predictability, job security, material or psychological welfare

Precarity (also precariousness) is an existence lacking in predictability, job security, material or psychological welfare. The social class defined by this condition has been termed the precariat.

== Catholic origins ==
Léonce Crenier, a Catholic monk who had previously been active as an anarcho-communist, may have established the English usage. In 1952 the term was documented by Dorothy Day, writing for the Catholic Worker Movement:

True poverty is rare ... Nowadays communities are good, I am sure, but they are mistaken about poverty. They accept, admit on principle, poverty, but everything must be good and strong, buildings must be fireproof, Precarity is rejected everywhere, and precarity is an essential element of poverty. That has been forgotten. Here we want precarity in everything except the church. ... Precarity enables us to help very much the poor. When a community is always building, and enlarging, and embellishing, which is good in itself, there is nothing left over for the poor. We have no right to do this as long as there are slums and breadlines somewhere.

— Anonymous Martinican priest, as quoted by Dorothy Day, The Catholic Worker, May 1952

== Theories ==
It is a term of everyday usage as Precariedad, Precariedade, Précarité, or Precarietà in some European countries, where it refers to the widespread condition of temporary, flexible, contingent, casual, intermittent work in postindustrial societies.

While contingent labor has been a constant of capitalist societies since the industrial revolution, Michael Hardt and Antonio Negri have argued that the flexible labor force has now moved from the peripheral position it had under Fordism to a core position in the process of capitalist accumulation under Post-Fordism, which is thought to be increasingly based on the casualized efforts of affective, creative, immaterial labor.

For philosopher Judith Butler, all human life is precarious, as all lives can be 'expunged at will or by accident' and precariousness is ineradicably part of human nature. Precariousness is living socially and recognising that one's life is always in the hands of and dependent upon others.

Precarity, on the other hand, describes a few different conditions that pertain to living beings. Anything living can be expunged at will or by accident; and its persistence is in no sense guaranteed. As a result, social and political institutions are designed in part to minimize conditions of precarity, especially within the nation-state

— Judith Butler, Performativity, Precariety and Sexual Politics, Lecture given at Universidad Complutense de Madrid. June 8, 2009

=== Precariat ===
In sociology, precariat refers to the social class formed by people with no job security, or no prospect of regular employment, distinct from the lumpenproletariat. The term is a neologism obtained by merging precarious with proletariat.

The precariat class has been emerging in advanced societies such as Japan, where it includes over 20 million so-called "freeters". The young precariat class in Europe became a serious issue in the early part of the 21st century.

== Precarious lives ==
For Butler, while all lives are equally defined by precariousness, some lives are more precarious. In Frames of War, this is illustrated in the political cultures of post-9/11 America: some lives are not grievable because they are not first recognised as living. Social norms and institutions maximise the precariousness of some and minimise that of others.

Precarity is rooted in social dynamics related to gender, social class, and inequality.

== Precarity in old age ==
Later life is a time of heightened precarity. Certain factors of later life are unpredictable. This is contingent on health, resources, and life itself: if a person is still alive and healthy, can manage financially, can live independently, has support from children, and so on, their precarity can be greatly reduced. But that is not the reality for many old folks. Life transitions are a source of precarity, even the positive ones, because they place the notion of self and social roles in flux. When a person's support network is altered, it places them in a position of social precarity. The timing and duration of the shift determine the experience or consequences of the stage of precarity. Culturally, some transitions may be socially contested or negatively sanctioned (such as same-sex marriage) and therefore create precarity through marginalization, support networks are limited, or they are denied legal protections. This has a heightened impact on older folks because their identity is primarily being old, which causes some people to take a limited view about their ability to experience other social situations, and denies the intersectionality of their lived reality.

Demography interacts with gender to create different worlds of precast for ageing women and men. There are different standards enforced by the gender binary that are weaponized against old folks to measure their ageing process. Because of this, precarity is shaped by gender and age simultaneously. For example, cultural differences dictate how ageing bodies are evaluated, including a 'double standard' in which the physical signs of ageing often accentuate a man's social capital but diminish it in women. This creates precarity for women because it results in harsher self and social judgements, and undermines their well-being. Although the double standard disadvantages women, ageing can also bring a loss of 'male attractiveness,' because of the cultural premium on youthfulness. Physical frailty may be harder for men because they place a premium on strength and independence.

== Combatting precarity ==
=== Global justice movement ===
Around 2000, the word started being used in its English usage by some global justice movement (sometimes identified with antiglobalization) activists (Marches Européennes contre le chômage la précarité et les exclusions - European Marches against unemployment, precarity and social exclusion), and also in EU official reports on social welfare. But it was in the strikes of young part-timers at McDonald's and Pizza Hut in winter 2000, that the first political union network emerged in Europe explicitly devoted to fighting precarity: Stop Précarité, with links to AC!, CGT, SUD, CNT, Trotskyists and other elements of the French radical left.

=== "San Precario" ===
February 29 is the feast day of San Precario, the patron saint of precarious workers, who – together with his feast day – was created by the Chainworkers at the Milanese space Reload where the 2004 EuroMayDay was organised with others, including the Critical Mass group. The Milan Critical Mass already had its own patron saint, "Santa Graziella" (Graziella is the brand name of a popular Italian folding bicycle).

San Precario was originally conceived as a male saint. The saint's first public appearance was at a Sunday supermarket opening on February 29, 2004:

A statue was carried in the streets, preceded by assorted clergy including a cardinal reciting prayers over a loudspeaker, and followed by pious people.

ChainWorkers then performed a hoax during the 2005 Milan Fashion Week, creating a fictive stylist, Serpica Naro, whose name was an anagram of "San Precario". According to the groups, the name functions like a multiple user name or myth such as Luther Blissett and quote the Wu Ming collective in giving theoretical coherence. However, it is mostly seen as a détournement of the Catholic concept of patron saints.

== See also ==
- Catholic social teaching
- Christian anarchism
- Directive on services in the internal market, also known as "Bolkestein Directive".
- Disposable household and per capita income
- Endo contractualization
- First Employment Contract (CPE)
- Flexicurity
- Gig worker
- Labour market flexibility
- McJob
- New Employment Contract (CNE)
- Peon
- Precariat
- Precarious work
- Social policy
- Social vulnerability
- Socioeconomic status
- Standard of living
- Tenure
- Throw to the wolves
- Wage slavery

== Bibliography ==
- Grenier, Amanda, Chris Phillipson, and Richard A Settersten (2021) Precarity and Ageing : Understanding Insecurity and Risk in Later Life. Bristol: Policy Press, An Imprint Of Bristol University Press.
- Standing, Guy (2011) The Precariat: The New Dangerous Class ISBN 1-84966-351-3 (Bloomsbury Academic)
- Thörnquist, Annette & Engstrand, Åsa-Karin (eds.) (2011) Precarious Employment in Perspective. Old and New Challenges to Working Conditions in Sweden. Work & Society. Vol. 70. Bruxelles: Peter Lang. ISBN 978-90-5201-730-3
- Lorey, Isabell. (2015) State of Insecurity: Government of the Precarious. Translated by Derieg, Aileen. London: Verso. 2015. ISBN 9781781685969.
