= Lorey (disambiguation) =

Lorey may refer to:

== Locations ==
- Lorey, a commune in the Meurthe-et-Moselle department in north-eastern France
- Le Lorey, a commune in the Manche department in Normandy in north-western France

== Surnames ==
- Albert Lorey Groll (1866–1952), American artist
- Dean Lorey (born 1967), American writer
- Isabell Lorey, German political theorist
- Maurice DeLorey (born 1927), Canadian politician
