= Meredith Haaf =

German feminist writer (born 1983)

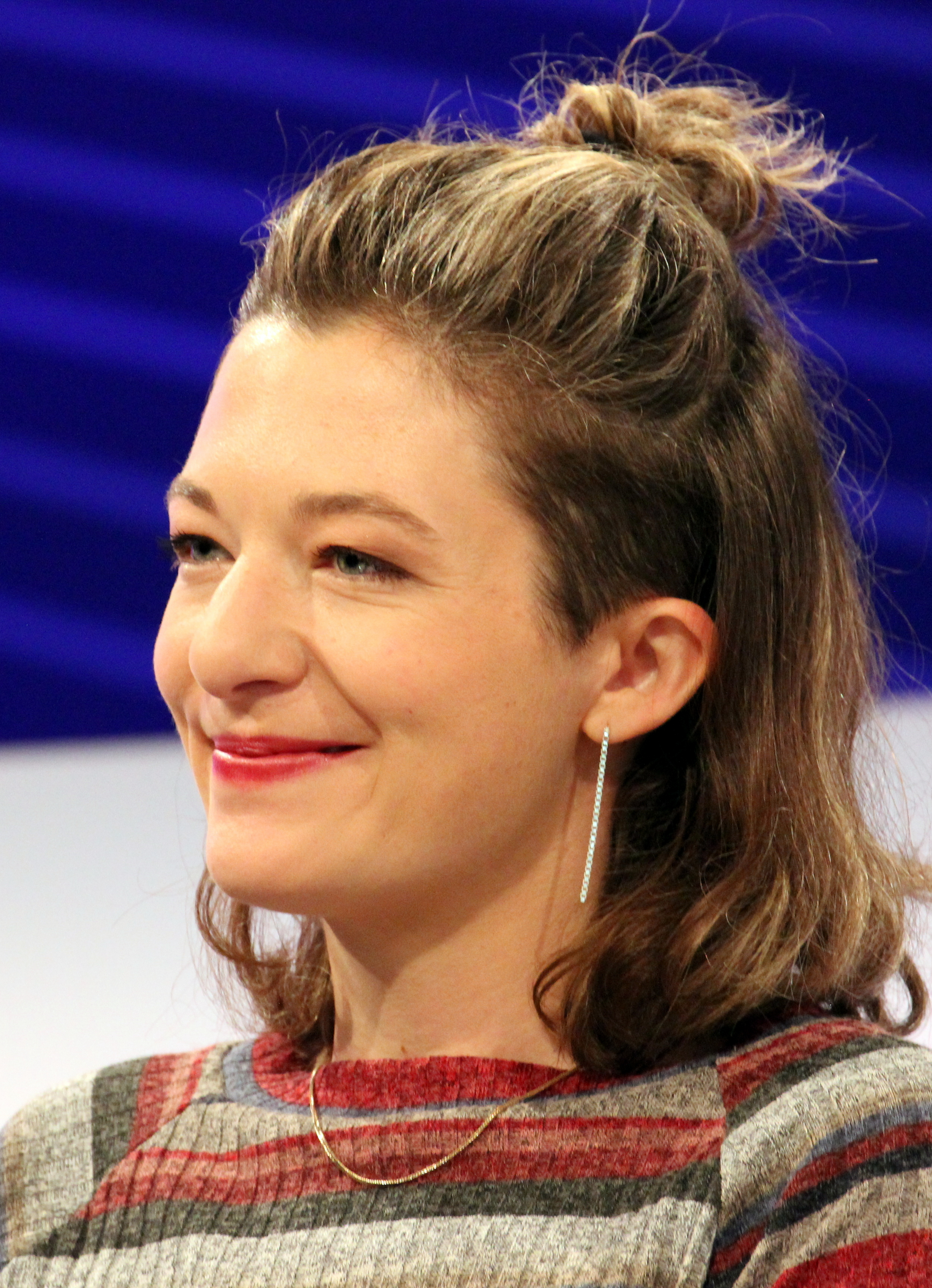
- Born: 1983 (age 42–43); Munich, Germany
- Citizenship: Germany
- Occupation: Writer
- Writing career
- Language: German

Meredith Haaf (born 1983) is a German feminist writer.

== Early life ==
Haaf was born in Munich, Germany in 1983.

== Career ==
In 2013, Les Inrockuptibles described Haaf as the "European...and anti-hipster" version of Lena Dunham. In her essays, Haaf examines Millennials, describing them as "consumers rather than citizens," and criticizing the world they have grown up within. Haaf acknowledges that her parents generation were more proactively political, and states that she wishes those of her own generation were the same way. She also examines subjects such as social media, welfare, job security, the economy, neoliberalism and technology. Haaf identifies as a feminist. She believes that pornography should be more equitable towards women in regards to the subject matter and performance aspects.
