= First Employment Contract =

2006 French law regarding employers and employees

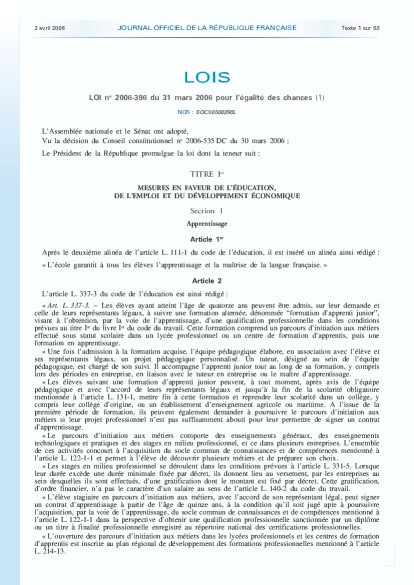
The first page of the law

The contrat première embauche (CPE; English: first employment contract) was a new form of employment contract pushed in spring 2006 in France by Prime Minister Dominique de Villepin. This employment contract, available solely to employees under 26, would have made it easier for the employer to fire employees by removing the need to provide reasons for dismissal for an initial "trial period" of two years, in exchange for some financial guarantees for employees, the intention being to make employers less reluctant to hire additional staff. However, the enactment of this amendment to the so-called "Equality of Opportunity Act" (loi sur l'égalité des chances) establishing this contract was so unpopular that soon massive protests were held, mostly by young students, and the government rescinded the amendment.

President Jacques Chirac declared that the law would be put on the statute book, but that it would not be applied. Article 8 of the 31 March 2006 Equality of Opportunity Act, establishing the CPE, was repealed by a 21 April 2006 law on the Access of Youth to Professional Life in Firms. The rest of the Equality of Opportunity Act, whose dispositions were also contested by the students' protests, was maintained.

== Legislative process ==
CPE was introduced by the Government as an amendment (n°3) to the "Statute on the Equality of Opportunities" law. This law was proposed by Prime Minister Dominique de Villepin allegedly to tackle a 23% unemployment rate among the young, and also as a response to the civil unrest in October 2005. The reasoning of the government for introducing CPE was that unemployment was one of the major causes of lawlessness in poorer neighbourhoods, that workforce laws putting the burden of proof for valid reasons for dismissal on the employer discouraged hiring, especially of people with "risky" profiles, and thus that making dismissal easier would improve the employment prospects of such youngsters.

The bill was examined by the French National Assembly between 31 January and 9 February. The amendment was adopted by the Assembly around 2 AM on 9 February 2006, after much heated debate. On the same day, in the afternoon, Prime Minister de Villepin announced to the National Assembly that he invoked article 49-3 of the Constitution of France on that text; this meant that the law would be considered adopted in its current state, without being approved by the National Assembly, unless a motion of censure were adopted by the Assembly. Since Villepin's UMP party had an absolute majority in the Assembly, there was no chance that such a motion could be adopted. Predictably, a motion of censure was proposed by the left-wing opposition and was rejected by the Assembly on 21 February.

The Law was then examined by the Senate between 23 February and 5 March, at which date the Senate approved it. Since the texts from the Assembly and the Senate were different, and the law was deemed urgent by the Prime Minister, the bill was sent before a mixed Assembly/Senate commission charged with the drafting of a compromise text. The law was then adopted on 8 March by the Assembly, and on 9 March by the Senate.

Because opposition members of the Assembly and the Senate requested constitutional review of the text, the law was sent before the Constitutional Council. The Council considered the law constitutional, but made a number of reservations, on 30 March. Those reservations impose guidelines under which the law was to be applied.

Meanwhile, the law was disapproved by a sizable proportion of the French population. Massive street protests began, mostly by students from high schools and universities, and Prime Minister de Villepin's approval rate began to plummet. The protest movement was certainly the biggest seen in France since 1968.

The whole act was signed into law on 31 March by president Jacques Chirac. However, Chirac paradoxically asked for a delay of application of the law (which he is not constitutionally empowered to do), to allow the conservative Union for a Popular Majority (UMP) to prepare a new law modifying the "Statute on the Equality of Opportunities" law (changing, in particular, the two years "probationary period" to only one year).

The student movement as well as all trade unions (including the CGT) and the Socialist Party asked not only for the suppression of the CPE but also of the CNE, a similar contract passed in November 2005 by the same government. On 10 April, as the protests were still getting bigger, the government completely withdrew the law, and substituted for it fiscal incentives to firms employing young people.

== Controversy ==
The CPE sparked debates among the political classes, and drew massive protests from students in the streets of France, along with sudden strikes. Criticism was levied at both the substance of the CPE and the way it was enacted.

Instead of putting the clauses creating CPE inside the bill it was proposing to Parliament, the government chose to submit it as an amendment of its own text. This bypasses some compulsory legal review by the Conseil d'État and reduces the time available for examination by members of the Parliament. Earlier in 2006, president of the Assembly Jean-Louis Debré, though a fellow member of UMP and an ally of Villepin, complained about the Villepin government submitting lengthy amendments of its own bills and said that it showed these bills were badly prepared. Furthermore, Prime Minister Dominique de Villepin forced approval of the law by the Assembly on its first reading by invoking article 49-3 of the Constitution: under 49-3, a bill is considered approved in its present state by the Assembly unless the Assembly chooses to dismiss the Prime Minister. Such a move hardly ever occurs, since both the Assembly and the Prime Minister are from the same majority. Use of 49-3 is seen as an infringement on the legislative prerogatives of Parliament and is thus reserved for exceptional cases. As many have pointed out, especially when the Prime Minister announced the use of 49-3, Dominique de Villepin has never run for elected office.

Although the CPE is the primary target of the student movement against the law, other measures of the "Statute on the Equality of Opportunities" have also been contested. Among them, allowing apprenticeships from as young as 14 years old (allowing a youth to leave the standard public education system), night work from the age of 15 (instead of 16 now) and suspension of certain type of welfare measures (families with more than three children have the right to some governmental financial support in France) when students skip school. This last measure has been for a long time in the program of the far-right movement Front National, thus also explaining part of the popular protests. The most controversial part of this new law lies in the way it brings flexibility to employers: this contract allows French employers to fire workers under the age of 26 without juridicial motive during the first two years of the contract, among other things.

If the employee seeks juridical recourse against arbitrary firing, the burden of proof would be reversed. In an indefinite contract, the burden of proof was reversed during the probationary period, which lasted from just a few days to three months, depending on the type of job, requiring an employee seeking legal recourse to prove they were unjustly fired rather than the employer to prove just cause for the dismissal.

=== Supporters ===
The CPE was officially designed to encourage employers to hire more employees under 26 by offering tax cuts and flexibility to employers, and was expected to offer young people access the job market that they have been desperately missing previously (One in four young people in France is unemployed, but the figure rises to 50% in the poor suburbs.) Unlike in more conservative employment environments, such as those of the US or the UK, firing an employee under long-term contract is made hard for French employers once the probation period (maximum three months) elapses. "Firing people is difficult and costly, this has made firms over the years more and more reluctant to take people on" The purported aim of the CPE law was to break this reluctance.

Supporters of the CPE believe it will reduce the high unemployment, particularly among poor youths. Employers, they contend, will be more willing to take chances with young employees if they are not constrained by France's job security laws. They claim that unemployment is partially caused by the restrictive labor laws which they believe have also helped keep economic growth at a low level by discouraging business foundation and expansion. Softening the "rigid employment code" has been the motto of MEDEF and employers in general for years, and is claimed by French liberals (those supporting free-market policies) to be a key way to help both economic growth and employment.

Supporters of the CPE and opponents of the blockading of the universities called demonstrations in the streets in March and April. These demonstrations of support from the government only mustered hundreds, while the anti-government protests got millions.

=== Critics ===
Critics of the law included all trade unions (evincing a rarely found unanimity between the various politically oriented unions – CGT, CFDT, FO, CFTC, CGC-CGE etc.), many students (for example the students' union UNEF), all the left-wing political parties, and – to a lesser extent – some centrist opponents, such as the moderately conservative Union for French Democracy (UDF), saying that the CPE would make it easier for employers to exert pressure on employees (lowering wages, sexual harassment, etc.) since they could dismiss their younger employees at any time, without any judicially contestable reason. Some opponents dubbed it the "Kleenex contract", implying that the CPE would allow employers to discard young people like facial tissue. According to them, the law will only encourage the growth of the working poor and the precarity phenomena, and violates a requirement of French labor law introduced in 1973, as well as article 24 of the European social charter, which states that the employer must provide a motive for dismissal of employees.

Sixty socialist deputies and sixty socialist senators appealed against the law to the Constitutional Council; see below.

== Protests ==
The law has met heavy resistance from students, trade unions, and left-wing activists, sparking protests in February and March 2006 (and continuing into April) with hundreds of thousands of participants in over 180 cities and towns across France. On 18 March, up to as many as 1.5 million demonstrated across France, over half of the country's 84 public universities were closed because of student blockades, and Bernard Thibault, the leader of the CGT, one of France's five major labour unions, suggested that a general strike across the country would occur if the law was not repealed. A big march was prepared for 4 April, while students' organizations had already called for a general strike. In the biggest student movement since 1968, mass meetings were held in many universities (In Toulouse over 4,000 students occupied the rugby stadium to hold their meeting). Motorways were blockaded and employers organisations offices were occupied. The actions were (unusually) supported by all of the main trade union federations and all the Left political parties (more or less enthusiastically). The protests spread to high schools, and involved large numbers of young people both from prestigious universities, and from technical high schools and other places of education drawing a mainly working class student body.

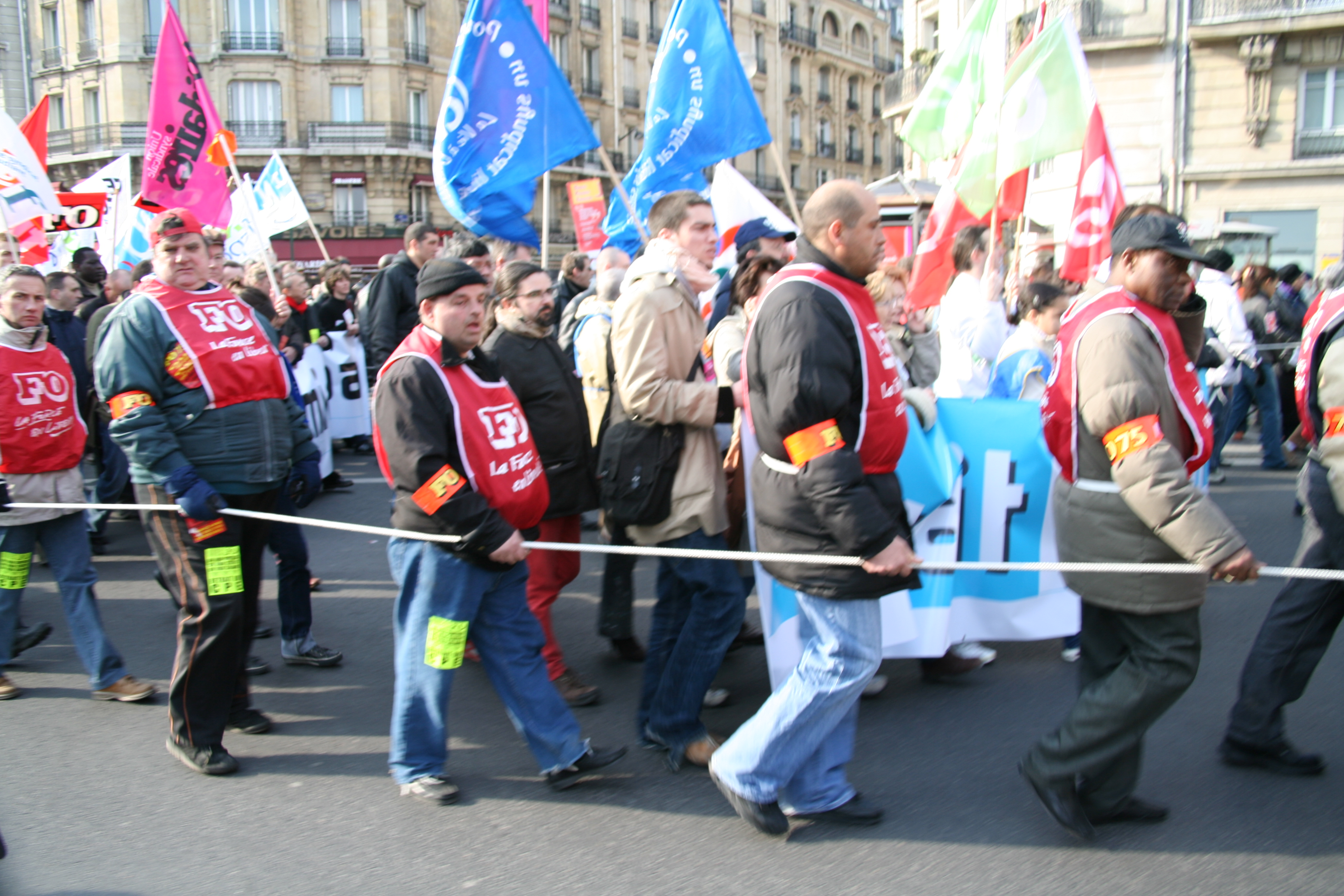
Demonstration against CPE, 18 March 2006, Paris

=== Strikes ===
Amid calls for a general strike, opponents agreed to a 'day of action' against the law, including strikes, demonstrations and university occupations across France on 28 March to oppose the law. Strikes disrupted transport, public education and mail services while more than one million to three million marched against the law. The estimates vary; the police estimate in the lower one million range while the unions estimate much higher. On 4 April, between 93,000 (police estimate) and 700,000 (union estimate) demonstrated in Paris and three million in all of France.

== Official response ==
On 21 March, the Prime Minister refused to change tack, saying that "with this law, there are three things which are impossible. The first is its withdrawal, because that would mean that we are surrendering to the logic of ultimatums and prerequisites. This is obviously what our electorate does not want, and they would not forgive us for it. The second is its suspension, quite simply because that is against our Constitution. And the third is reworking the bill, because if it loses its balance, any chance for success would be deprived."

On 30 March, the Constitutional Council, the highest constitutional authority, validated most of the law, along with its 8th article instituting the First Employment Contract. The law was considered to abide by the Constitution of France; the Constitutional Council didn't pronounce on the question of conformity to international and European law, which it is not empowered to consider. The Socialist deputies and senators who had deposed the legal recourse before the Constitutional Council notably claimed that the law was superseded by article 24 of the European social charter, which states that the employer must give a juridical motive before firing an employee, and against the International Labour Convention (n°158). Labor courts would have to create jurisprudence concerning this point.

On the evening of 31 March, President Chirac announced in an address to the nation that he would promulgate the law, but asked the government at the same time to prepare a new law including two modifications: the trial period would be reduced to one year, and employers would now have to give a reason for the dismissal of the employment. However, Chirac did not specify whether this reason would be a juridical motive or a simple letter without any juridical value. He also asked employers not to start using the contract until these modifications came into force, but suggested no means of enforcement. Chirac's paradoxical call (officially promulgating the law while unofficially asking at the same time for its suspension) has only baffled both partisans and opponents of the text. The president's move was widely analyzed by the press as support for his prime minister Dominique de Villepin against his 2007 election rival, Nicolas Sarkozy, who was the leader of Chirac's political party, the UMP. Villepin had declared that he would have resigned had Chirac refused to promulgate the law. Some 2,000 students were waiting on the Place de la Bastille for Chirac's address to the nation. After hearing it, they carried out a night demonstration, which collected as many as 6,000 persons between the Hôtel de Ville and the Opéra. A few hundred demonstrators continued until four in the morning.

== Substitution ==
On 10 April, the French government decided to withdraw the CPE and rewrite it by introducing new measures. This decision appears to be an about-face for Dominique de Villepin.

== See also ==
- 2006 labor protests in France
- Contrat nouvelle embauche
- Labor law
- Job security
- Precarity
- Working poor

== Sources ==
- Legislative process (all links in French)
  - Legislative files: National assembly, Senate
  - Text of the law
  - Vote on the motion of censure
  - Decision of the French Constitutional Council
- libcom.org CPE France blog: most comprehensive English-language coverage of the movement against the CPE
- CPE legal news and resources, JURIST
- "Huge protests against French job law, some violence". Reuters. 18 March 2006.
- "French Protests Over Youth Labor Law Spread to 150 Cities and Towns". The New York Times. 18 March 2006.
- Call to strike action (in French)
- Labor Law Protests in France: 1968 Encore?, JURIST
- "French court approves disputed youth jobs law", Reuters, 30 March 2006.
- "Chirac to sign job law and seek changes", Reuters, 31 March 2006.
