= Trade unions in Angola =

- National organization(s): CGSILA, UNTA
- Primary legislation: Article 33, Constitution

Global Rights Index
- 4 Systematic violations of rights

International Labour Organization
- Angola is a member of the ILO

Convention ratification
- Freedom of Association: 13 June 2001
- Right to Organise: 4 June 1976

Before 1975, while under Portuguese rule, Trade unions in Angola existed primarily as "occupational syndicates" - operating welfare services, but banned from collective bargaining and strike action. Independent African trade unions were illegal, however, some underground or exiled unions existed, and were involved in the struggle for Angolan independence.

When the Movimento Popular de Libertação de Angola (MPLA) came to power in 1975 the National Union of Angolan Workers (UNTA) became the sole national trade union centre. There is now an independent trade union centre as well, the General Centre of Independent and Free Unions of Angola.

Trade union membership in Angola is limited both by the small formal economy, and the high unemployment rate within the sector. The Government of Angola is the largest employer within the country, and wages within the government are set yearly, with consultation from unions, but without direct negotiations.
