= General Centre of Independent and Free Unions of Angola =

CGSILA
- General Centre of Independent and Free Unions of Angola
- Central Geral de Sindicatos Independentes e Livres de Angola
- Founded: 8 June 1996
- Headquarters: Luanda, Angola
- Location: Angola
- Members: 50,000
- Key people: Manuel Maria Difuila, President
- Affiliations: ITUC

The General Centre of Independent and Free Unions of Angola (CGSILA) is a national trade union centre of Angola. With a membership of 50,000, it is led by Manuel Maria Difuila as President.
