= 2006 youth protests in France =

Protest movement opposing changes to labor law

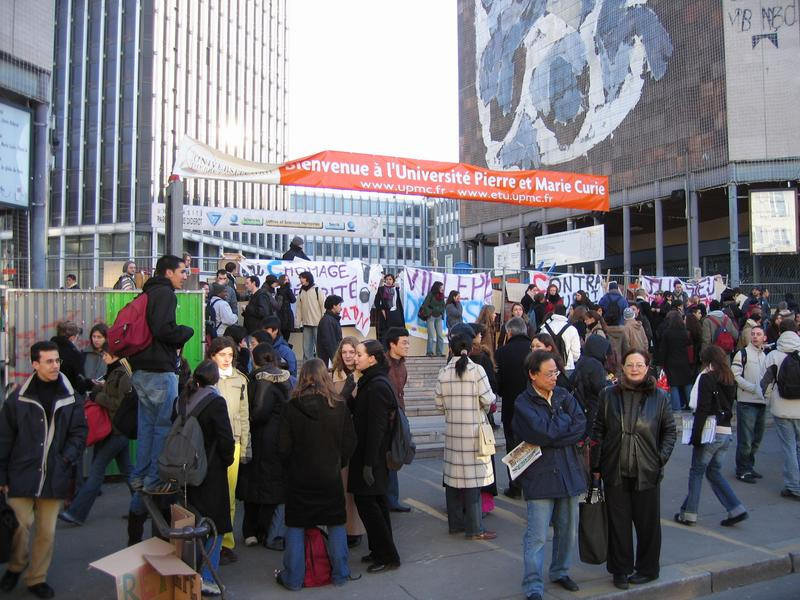
The protest at Jussieu Campus

Nationwide protests occurred in France from February to April 2006 in opposition to a measure set to deregulate labour. Young people were the primary participants in the protests as the bill would have directly affected their future jobs in a way that they considered negative.

== The labour bill ==
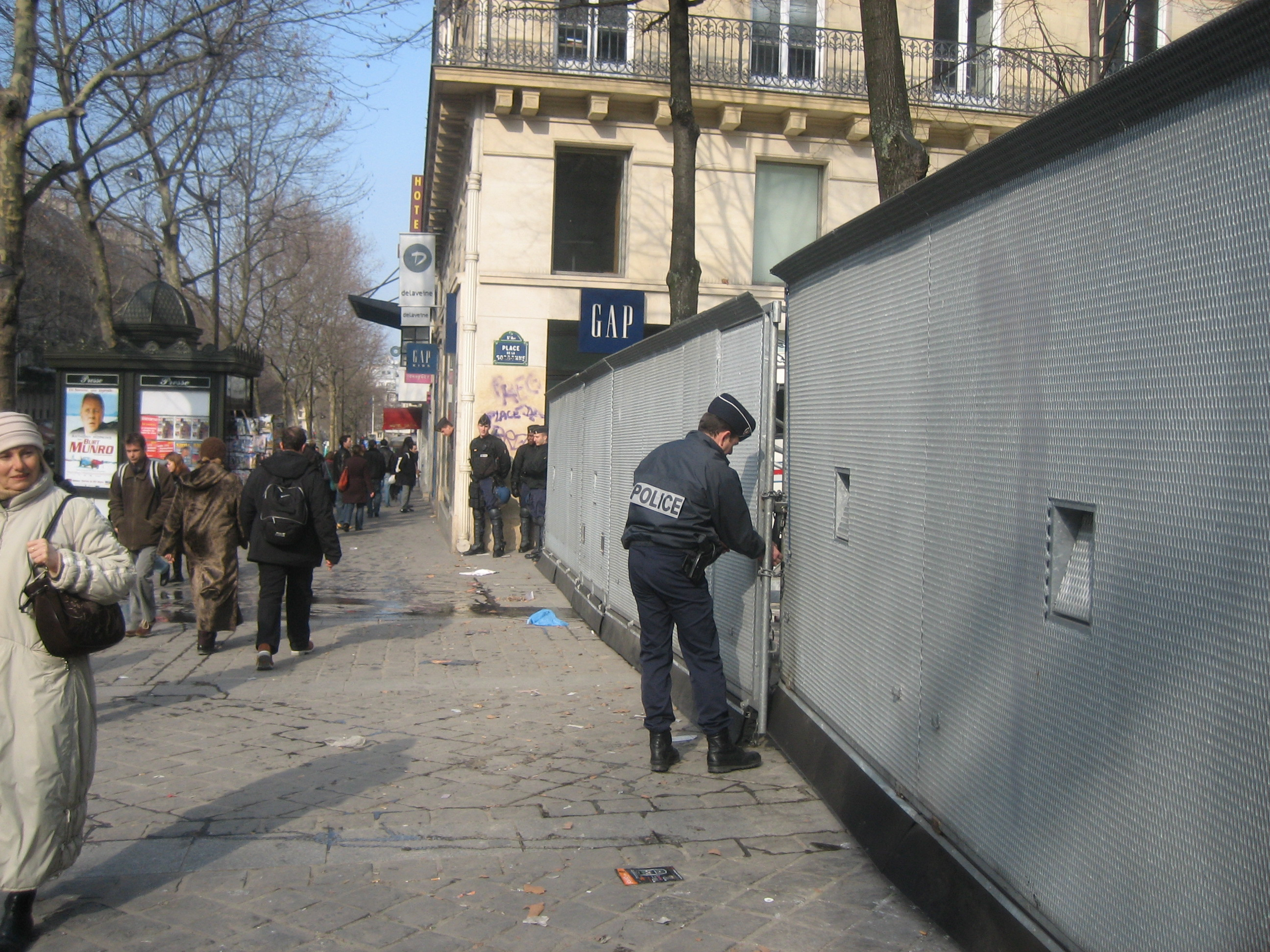
To protect the city, public authorities ordered the Place de la Sorbonne closed. This square has been a symbol for French student protests since May 1968.

The controversial bill, entitled "Loi pour l'égalité des chances" ("Equal Opportunity Law"), created a new job contract, the Contrat première embauche (CPE – First Employment Contract or Beginning Workers Contract).

Under this job contract, which aimed to encourage the creation of new jobs, it would have been easier, during a contract's first two years, for workers under twenty-six years old to be fired. It would have allowed employers the opportunity to terminate employment of workers under twenty-six without any reason, within their first two years of employment. Those opposed to the First Employment Contract were worried that it could compromise job security, encourage social pressure with a view to lowering wages, and impede employees in having legal recourse in cases of sexual harassment or other abuse, since this could lead to them subsequently being fired.

Proponents of the bill argued that France's tightly regulated employment market discourages French businesses from employing staff, which has led to France suffering high unemployment. High unemployment, especially for young immigrants, was seen as one of the driving forces behind the 2005 civil unrest in France and this unrest mobilized the perceived public urgency for the First Employment Contract. Youths are particularly at risk as they have been locked out of the same career opportunities as older workers, contributing to both a rise in tensions amongst the economically disenfranchised underclass, and, some claim, a brain drain of graduates leaving for better opportunities in Britain and the United States.

The French population was roughly split on the issue of whether the First Employment Contract should be implemented. The contract was first proposed after the civil unrest that occurred in France in October and November 2005. French Prime Minister Dominique de Villepin's rating dropped to a four-month low of forty-two percent, largely because of the recent protests against the bill. He stated though that he had the backing of French President Jacques Chirac. Later on, polls in L'Express and Paris-Match displayed a swing of the population behind protesters – around 70% were against the CPE law when it was promulgated by president Chirac.

The bill also included the possibility of manual labour apprenticeships for 14-year-olds, suspension of family welfare in cases of students skipping school (a measure long in the programme of the far-right National Front party), and night labour being permitted for youths as young as 15 years old (as compared to 16 years old before).

== The protests ==
=== February ===
Protests against the bill originally occurred before the bill was approved by Dominique de Villepin. On 7 February, between 200,000 and 400,000 people took part in 187 demonstrations. Some universities, including Rennes, were also occupied during February.

A torched car burns in Paris on 18 March

=== Early March ===
Over a million took part in protests on 7 March. On 9 March, around 38 universities were on strike.

=== 16 March ===
Protests across France on 16 March led to widespread disruptions. Approximately one hundred bicyclists barricaded streets around the Louvre in protests unrelated to the labour contract. (The protest around the Louvre concerned the lack of sports teachers in schools.) Another hundred protesters descended on City Hall in Rennes, refusing to leave. Other, mostly peaceful, protests occurred throughout the country, in cities such as Marseille. Many universities, including the University of Toulouse, were forced to close on 16 March as some wanted them to remain open and others wanted them closed during the large protests.

=== 18 March ===
Media attention focused on the violent element of the demonstrations in Paris on 18 March, when as many as 700,000 protesters converged on the city's Place de la Nation. Once the protesters departed from the meeting, a few dozen rioters began to torch cars and vandalize store fronts as police were called in to calm the situation. To suppress the crowd, police officers began to spray tear gas.

In the evening, new clashes occurred on the Place de la Sorbonne, between a hundred demonstrators and the police, until 1 am.

A protester from that night, Cyril Ferez, a trade unionist from the Sud-PTT union, trampled by riot police, was in a coma for three weeks after skirmishes in the Place de la Nation, Paris.

That day saw 156 people being arrested in Paris.

Protesters in Marseille were also sprayed with tear gas after some of them climbed Marseille's City Hall and replaced a French flag with a flag that proclaimed "anticapitalism."

Throughout the rest of the country, less violent protests occurred. In the estimated 160 protests organized around the country, police estimated that half a million students and labourers participated. Organizers estimated the number was closer to 1.5 million.

Students (including high school students) demonstrations began to become daily, and often were the site of clashes with the police.

=== 21 March ===
After large demonstrations and subsequent riots on 16 and 18 March, on the 21st the Dijon students' union called for a general strike, as demanded by left-wing papers such as Libération. A meeting that day of various labour and student groups agreed for another 'day of action' against the law, including strikes, demonstrations and university occupations across the country.

=== 23 March ===
Riots erupted again after a day of relative calm in several cities in France. According to the French national ministry of education, universities had continued their strike and 21 universities out of 84 were entirely blocked by students. In total, 67 universities were either on strike or blockage.

=== 28 March ===
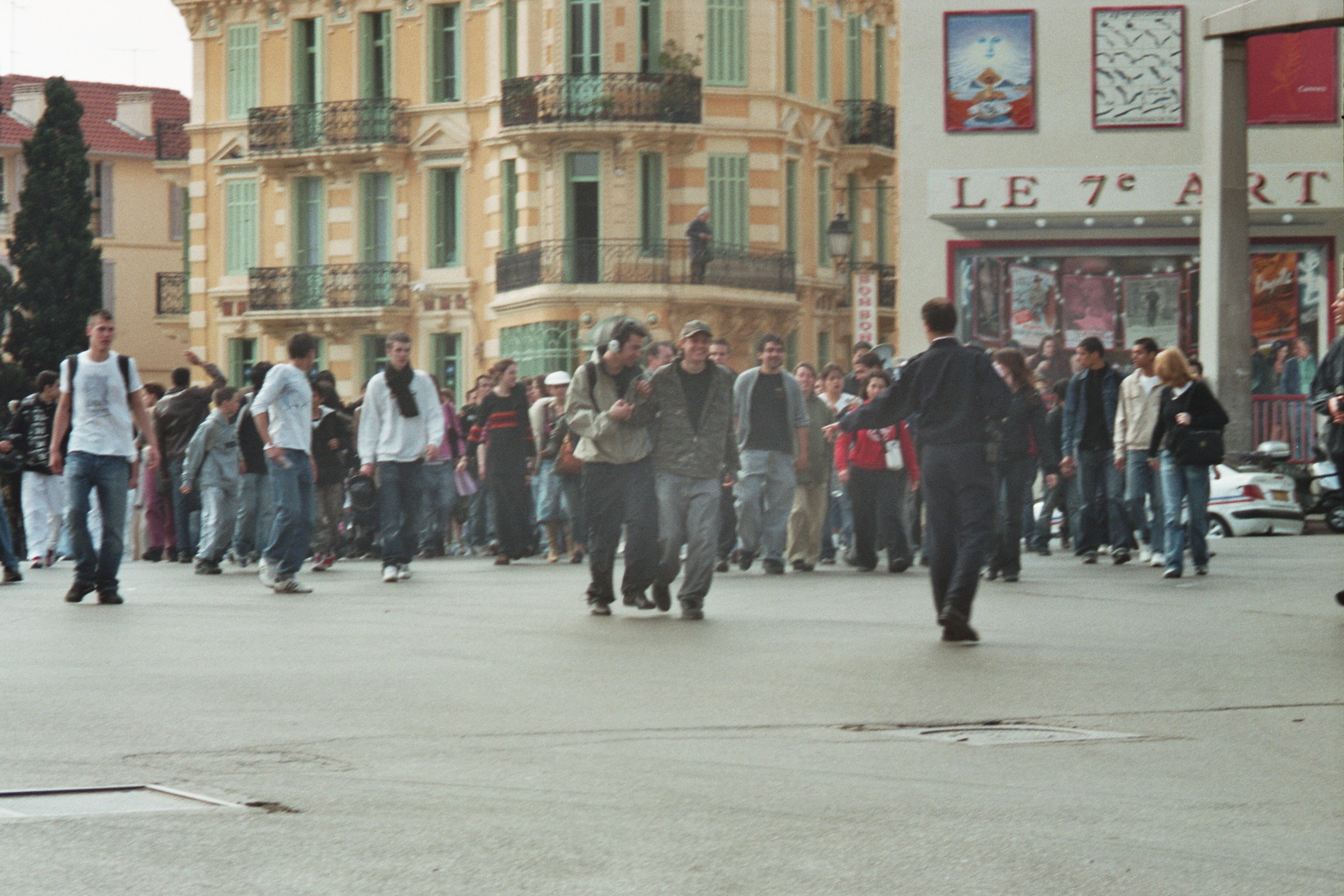
In Cannes, on 31 March, a few hundred youths blocked the important junction "Place du 18 juin" for 10 to 15 minutes.

CPE opponents convened a fourth national 'day of action' against the law on 28 March, including strikes, demonstrations and university occupations across France. Strikes disrupted rail and air transport, public education and mail services while between 1.055 million people (according to police estimates) and 2.71 million (according to union estimates) marched against the law. Much of the discrepancy in crowd estimates is in Paris where the police estimated 92,000 demonstrators while unions estimated 700,000. Whatever the sources, this is double the number that on 16 March demonstration, and more than during the December 1995 protests against the reform of pensions laws. 600 persons were arrested by the police Police repression also took place in minor towns, such as Lons-le-Saunier (Jura) or Lannion (Côtes d'Armor).

=== 4 April ===
In total 3.1 million people (according to the CGT) or 1 million (according to the police) people turned out to protest the law throughout the country, while rail and air transport were affected.

=== 11 April ===
The CPE was scrapped by Chirac on 10 April under the pressure of ongoing protests and blockade across France, though some protests continue against the law of which it was part (the loi pour l'égalité des chances [Equal Opportunity Law], or LEC). Protests were smaller in scale as the movement against the CPE split into those that wanted to fight the LEC and those that considered the victory against the CPE to be an acceptable compromise. Because of this split, and because of the universities' Easter holidays, the movement lost its momentum and within a week of the law's withdrawal, the major acts of protest, such as university occupations, had essentially ceased. By 18 April the students at every one of the blocked universities had either voted to reopen immediately, or were on holiday with no blockade planned afterward.

== University occupations ==
Barricade and gendarmes mobiles around the Sorbonne.

During the dispute, numerous student bodies went on strike, or occupied parts of their faculties. Due to police counter-attacks at the Sorbonne, an initial occupation was repulsed – yet the national student federation UNEF claimed that the number of occupations carried on increasing – by the end of March, 68 of France's 89 universities were on strike according to UNEF.

"The strikes that formed the backdrop to the protests disrupted aspects of daily life from transportation to services." (New York Times Database). Many places within those areas were with closed or worked a lot slower than they normally did. Some places that were affected were universities, schools, post offices, etc.

== Detentions ==
According to the Collectif Assistance Juridique (CAJ) independent group, a total of 4,500 people were arrested during the events. Among them, 1,950 were kept in garde à vue and 635 prosecution cases opened. Less than 15% of the arrested people were therefore presented to the magistrates, due to insufficient evidence of alleged legal violations. The CAJ note that many of the people presented before the courts had no previous criminal record and were far from the profile of "criminal rioters". They included many leaders of the movement, in particular outside Paris. A 24 March 2006 internal administrative order asked the magistrates not to be too lenient on their judgments. 42% of the persons presented before courts passed in immediate comparution, a specific (and controversial) procedure, which allow them to be judged on the spot. During the 1994 demonstrations against the CIP, a student law prepared by Balladur's government, 1000 persons only had been arrested, although the clashes had been more violent. Although Interior Minister Nicolas Sarkozy stated on 16 March that his "priority was to arrest casseurs" (rioters), the independent CAJ (Judicial Assistance Group) noted that the vast majority of arrestations hadn't been of on-the-spot witnessed violence (flagrant délit) and that many were contested. For example, on 31 March a US citizen visiting Paris was detained by the police, while on 7 April an old man getting out of a supermarket was also detained. Furthermore, many young people from the suburbs were blocked from demonstrating in Paris. According to the government, this was to impede turmoils in the capital, but critics such as the CAJ have spoken of a negation of presumption of innocence and of "racial and social discrimination", since some categories of the population – mainly youth living in housing projects, those accused of having taken part in the riots in autumn 2005 – were blocked from exercising their civil rights of demonstrating against a law that affected them as well as other categories of the population. These blockings in suburbs' train stations have provoked in some cases clashes with the police, for example in Savigny-sur-Orge, in Saint-Denis or in Les Ulis... "There is no evidence which permit us to establish a parallel between the young rioters of November and the disturbing elements of this spring", notes the CAJ report, countering the Interior Minister's claims. Furthermore, police abuse was reported on a number of cases, including Cyril Ferez, a trade union member who entered coma state for several weeks following the 18 March demonstration. In Caen Charlotte entered coma for a day; Victor had two ribs broken, etc. A three-year-old child was placed 24 hours in observation after having inhaled gas. On 16 March, the Parisian préfecture de police announced that 18 demonstrators had been injured. The IGS (internal affairs department) was charged of Cyril Ferez' case (who was in coma for several weeks) and litigation was initiated against police officers allegedly excessively brutal and violent during arrests. Additionally, cooperation between the police forces and the trade union "service orders" (SO, in charge of the demonstrations) was observed, including handing-over of several demonstrators to the police by the trade union's SO. Finally, the CAJ note the disproportion of sentences toward young demonstrators, while others acts of vandalism currently committed by farmers or viticulturists were more lightly punished. It thus alluded to this Alsatian mayor accused of having burned 14 travel trailers but who was condemned only to six months on parole, contrasting with the sentences given to demonstrators (for example, a high school student condemned to 41 days of jail in Fleury-Mérogis because he had burnt two garbage cans before his school).

== See also ==
- Contrat Nouvelle Embauche
- First Employment Contract
- November 2007 strikes in France
- May 1968
- 2005 civil unrest in France
- 2006 student protests in Chile
- 2008 civil unrest in Greece
- 2024 French protests against the far-right
- Death of Malik Oussekine
