= Journal of Workplace Rights =

- Discipline: Labour relations
- Language: English
- Edited by: Joel Rudin

Publication details
- Former name(s): Journal of Individual Employment Rights
- History: 1992-present
- Publisher: Baywood Publishing
- Frequency: Quarterly

Standard abbreviations
- ISO 4: J. Workplace Rights

Indexing
- ISSN: 1938-4998 (print); 1938-5005 (web)
- Journal of Individual Employment Rights
- ISSN: 1055-7512

Links
- Journal homepage

The Journal of Workplace Rights is a peer-reviewed academic journal covering labor-management relations, employment discrimination, and employment law. It covers the theoretical and practical sides of employment issues such as record keeping, occupational safety and health, fair employment practices, addicted workers, AIDS in the workplace, medical screening, employee surveillance, wage and hour standards, union-management relations, employment contracts, and dispute and grievance resolution. The journal is edited by Joel Rudin (Rowan University).

Cover of the Journal of Individual Employment Rights

== History ==
The Journal of Workplace Rights was established in 1992 as the Journal of Individual Employment Rights and obtained its current title in 2008.

== Abstracting and indexing ==
The journal is abstracted and indexed in the Social Sciences Citation Index, Employee Relations Bibliography & Abstracts, Human Resources Abstracts, Left Index, Personnel Management Abstracts, Urban Affairs Abstracts, and Violence & Abuse Abstracts.
