= Isabell Lorey =

Academic background
- Education: Dr. phil.
- Alma mater: University of Tübingen
- Thesis: Immer Ärger mit dem Subjekt : theoretische und politische Konsequenzen eine jurirdischen Machtmodells: Judith Butler (1996)
- Influences: Judith Butler, Michel Foucault

Academic work
- Discipline: Political Science, Gender Studies
- Sub-discipline: Political Theory
- Institutions: European Institute for Progressive Cultural Policies, University of Kassel
- Main interests: Biopolitics, Precarity, Social Movements
- Notable works: State of Insecurity: Government of the Precarious

Isabell Lorey (German: [ˈiːzabɛl loːˈʁaɪ]) is a political theorist at the European Institute for Progressive Cultural Policies and professor at the Institute for Political Science at the University of Kassel.

== Education ==
In 1996, Lorey graduated from the University of Tübingen. Her dissertation, which focused on subjectivity construction in the philosophy of Judith Butler as well as its political and theoretical implications for feminist theory, later became her first book.

== Career ==
Prior to her professorship at the University of Kassel, Lorey taught at the Center for Gender Studies at the University of Basel, the Humboldt University Berlin, the University of Vienna, and the Berlin University of the Arts, where she held a C1-professorship in gender and postcolonial studies, working with Katharina Sieverding. Lorey is also an editor of the Viennese publishing house transversal texts.

== Work ==
Lorey's writings have covered a number of different issues in the domain of political theory; however, her work primarily addresses the subjects of precarity, biopolitics, neoliberalism, social movements (most notably Euromayday), and critical theory.

=== State of Insecurity: Government of the Precarious ===
Published in 2015, State of Insecurity: Government of the Precarious connects the notion of precarity with governmentality, arguing that the former has become definitive of the way in which modern states govern. Lorey proposes a tripartite definition of the term 'precarious' arguing that it is composed of three dimensions: precariousness, precarity and governmental precarization. 'Precariousness' draws conceptually on both Judith Butler and Jean-Luc Nancy's writings, and is defined by Lorey as a shared quality among both human and non-human beings. While not a transhistorical property, precariousness is an existential and social quality that is shared among beings, and defined as "an endangerment of bodies that is ineluctable and hence not to be secured." 'Precarity' stipulates how precariousness is distributed hierarchically, as well as how inequalities are established among beings. Lastly, 'governmental precarization' refers to "modes of governing" and for Lorey is related historically to "the formation of industrial capitalist conditions ... in modern Western societies [and] cannot be separated historically from the ideologeme of bourgeois sovereignty."

== Bibliography ==
=== Books in English ===
- Lorey, Isabell (2015). State of Insecurity: Government of the Precarious. Translated by Derieg, Aileen. London: Verso. ISBN 9781781685969.
- Lorey, Isabell (2022). Democracy in the Political Present: A Queer-Feminist Theory. Translated by Rosenblatt, Lisa. London: Verso. ISBN 9781839767333.

=== Books in German ===
- Lorey, Isabell (1996). Immer Ärger mit dem Subjekt. Politische und theoretische Konsequenzen eines juridischen Machtmodells: Judith Butler. Tübingen: Diskord. ISBN 9783892956099.
- Lorey, Isabell (2011). Figuren des Immunen : Elemente einer politischen Theorie. Zürich: Diaphanes. ISBN 978-3037341513.
- Lorey, Isabell (2020). Demokratie im Präsens. Eine Theorie der politischen Gegenwart. Berlin: Suhrkamp. ISBN 978-3-518-29927-2.
