= Job security =

Assurance of continued employment

Job security is the probability that an individual will keep their job; a job with a high level of security is such that a person with the job would have a small chance of losing it. Many factors threaten job security: globalization, outsourcing, downsizing, recession, and new technology, to name a few.

Basic economic theory holds that during periods of economic expansion businesses experience increased demand, which in turn necessitates investment in more capital or labor. When businesses are experiencing growth, job confidence and security typically increase. The opposite often holds true during a recession: businesses experience reduced demand and look to downsize their workforces in the short term.

Governments and individuals are both motivated to achieve higher levels of job security. Governments attempt to do this by passing laws (such as the U.S. Civil Rights Act of 1964) which make it illegal to fire employees for certain reasons. Individuals can influence their degree of job security by increasing their skills through education and experience, or by moving to a more favorable location. The official unemployment rate and employee confidence indexes are good indicators of job security in particular fields. These statistics are closely watched by economists, government officials, and banks.

Unions also strongly influence job security. Jobs that traditionally have a strong union presence such as many government jobs and jobs in education, healthcare and law enforcement are considered very secure while many non-unionized private sector jobs are generally believed to offer lower job security, although this varies by industry and country.

Career adaptability also has an impact on job insecurity, with adaptable individuals usually being less insecure. Some studies have shown that career adaptability is significantly and positively correlated with internal and external market resilience, and internal and external market resilience is significantly and negatively correlated with occupational insecurity.

== By country ==
=== In the United States ===
While all economies are impacted by market forces (which change the supply and demand of labor), the United States is particularly susceptible to these forces due to a long history of fiscal conservatism and minimal government intervention.

Minimal government intervention has helped the United States create an at-will employment system that applies across many industries. Consequently, with limited exceptions, an employee's job security closely follows an employer's demand for their skills. For example, in the aftermath of the dot com boom of 1997–2000, employees in the technology industry experienced a massive drop in job security and confidence. More recently, in 2009 many manufacturing workers experienced a similar drop in job security and confidence. Closely following market forces also means that employment in the United States rebounds when industries adjust to new economic realities. For example, employee confidence and job security in both manufacturing and technology have rebounded substantially.

In the United States job insecurity is higher for men than women, with workers aged 30–64 experiencing more insecurity when compared with other age groups. Divorced or separated workers, and workers with less than a high school diploma also report higher job insecurity. Overall, workers in the construction industry have the highest rate of job insecurity at 55%.

The impact of unemployment and job insecurity on both mental and physical health is now the subject of a growing body of research. This will offer insights into why, for example, an increasing number of men in the United States are not returning to work. In 1960, only 5% of men ages 30–35 were unemployed whereas roughly 13% were unemployed in 2006. The New York Times attributes a large portion of this to blue collar and professional men refusing to work in jobs that they are overqualified for or do not provide adequate benefits in contrast to their previous jobs. It could also be attributed to a mismatch between the skills employees currently have, and the skills employers in traditionally male dominated industries (such as manufacturing) are looking for.

According to data from 2014 employee confidence reports, 50% of all current workers 18 and over feel confident in their ability to find a new job if necessary, and 60% are confident in the future of their employer. Job insecurity, defined as being worried about becoming unemployed, is a concern to 25% of U.S. workers.

Due to lockdowns during the COVID-19 pandemic, workplaces moved from office to home. Employees worried about the potential career consequences of losing productivity and effectiveness while working from home owing to a lack of work-life balance. According to studies, workers worried that their jobs might be at risk if they performed poorly while working from home during the epidemic.

==== Outsourcing ====
Overseas outsourcing (sometimes called offshoring) may decrease job security for people in certain occupations such as telemarketers, computer programmers, medical transcriptionists, and bookkeeping clerks. Generally, to outsource work to a different country the job must be quick to learn and the completed work must be transferable with minimal loss of quality.

=== In India ===
In India job security is high as Indian labour law make firing difficult for permanent employees. Most Indians work till retirement in the same company apart from workers in some sectors such as technology. Due to large population, competition is high but so is the size of the job market.

== See also ==
- Dismissal
- First Employment Contract (a French contract that provoked massive protests before being finally repealed)
- Contingent work
- Flexicurity
- Full employment
- Job guarantee
- Occupational safety and health
- Permatemp
- McJob
- Precarious work
