= 2021 French labor protests =

2021 protests in France

Protest and strikes of the CGT union 2021
- Part of protests against Emmanuel Macron
- Date: 19 January – 6 February 2021
- Location: France
- Caused by: French pension reform proposal Economic and employment impacts of COVID-19; Proposed laws granting police greater powers and restricting civil liberties
- Goals: Labor rights Civil liberties
- Methods: Strike action; Protest; Barricades; Blocking traffic; Disabling traffic; Offering free service

Parties
| Yellow vests movement CGT; FO; SUD; FSU; Left Party; Gauche révolutionnaire CFE-CGC; CNT-F; French Antifa; Anarchist Revolutionaries | Government of France: National Police; CRS; National Gendarmerie |

Lead figures
| Jean-Luc Mélenchon; Left Party politician | Emmanuel Macron; President of France: Jean Castex Prime Minister of France; Gérald Darmanin Minister of Interior; Bruno Le Maire Ministry of the Economy and Finance |

The 2021 French labor protests were a series of protests and strikes organized by the General Confederation of Labour (France) (CGT), other trade unions, and French citizens dissatisfied with the country's economic and employment conditions in the wake of the COVID-19 pandemic. These were followed by protests against proposed laws that would give greater powers to police.

Three student unions – the National Union of Secondary Students, Mouvement national lycéen, and Fédération indépendante et démocratique lycéenne – gathered to announce protests against the government's handling of the COVID-19 pandemic, and the resulting health, economic, and social consequences. They accused the government of making decisions which had negative impacts on employment and youth. Trade unions and other activist organizations decided to mobilize for protests in January and early February to call for job security, especially in the public service.

The first of these protests took place on Tuesday, 19 January 2021, in Marseille. Theatre actors gathered, expressing dissatisfaction with the month-long closure of theatres due to the COVID-19 pandemic. On 20 January 2021, students from various parts of France gathered in Paris and several other cities chanting the slogan: "Defend living conditions and studies." In Paris, on 21 January 2021, hundreds of people demonstrated in front of the Ministry of Health, waving posters that read: "Our struggle, your health", "Increase our salaries", and "Money for the hospital, not the capital". They pointed out the poor working conditions of "all medical, social, health and sanitation workers". Staff of hospitals and nursing homes were offered a salary increase of 183 Euros net minimum as part of the Ségur de la santé consultations with some health professionals, while other workers in the sector were "forgotten" even though "we have equivalent diplomas."

On 23 January, workers from CGT and other worker unions, as well as workers at companies including Sanofi, Cargill, SKF, and General Electric, protested against layoffs; members of the yellow vests movement, along with left-wing parliamentarians including Left Party leader Jean-Luc Mélenchon, attended this protest.

At the invitation of several yellow vests collectives and as part of mobilizations against proposed laws threatening civil liberties – the global security law proposal and the law enforcing respect for the principles of the republic (also known as the law "against separatism") – a united march for freedom was scheduled for Saturday, 23 January 2021, in Paris. The meeting began at 11:00 a.m. in front of the State Council and ended at noon at the Place du Palais-Royal. The convergence took place at 2:00 p.m. in front of the National Assembly.

On 31 January 2021, several thousand members of student associations and the LGBTQ community gathered in Paris to protest against poor educational and social conditions.

The main rally organized by the CGT took place on 4 February 2021 in Paris and other cities across France. Participants came from across all social classes and industries. In Paris, protests by higher education unions, activists, and teachers saw minor incidents between police and protesters.

Unions in Bordeaux chose 6 February 2021 for their own protest and national strike to demand pension reform. Several hundred people gathered on this occasion.

== See also ==
- 1995 strikes in France
- 2010 French pension reform strikes
- Protests against Emmanuel Macron
- 2019–2020 French pension reform strike
