= Agence France-Presse =

French international news agency

- AFP headquarters in Paris
- Type: Private organization with special status, operating under commercial rules
- Industry: News media
- Founded: 1835; 191 years ago (as Havas)
- Founder: Charles-Louis Havas (as Havas)
- Headquarters: Paris, France
- Area served: Worldwide
- Key people: Charles-Louis Havas, Jean Marin, Henri Pigeat, Pierre Louette, Emmanuel Hoog
- Products: Text, photo, video, audio, and graphics
- Revenue: €321.9 million (2022) €309.5 million (2021)
- Number of employees: 2,400 (2023)
- Subsidiaries: Sport-Informations-Dienst
- Website: www.afp.com; www.afp.com/en

Agence France-Presse (AFP; French pronunciation: [aʒɑ̃s fʁɑ̃s pʁɛs]) is a French international news agency headquartered in Paris, France. Its origins date back to 1835, when it was founded as Havas, the world's oldest news agency. In August 1944, following the Liberation of Paris, it was reorganized as Agence France-Presse to succeed Havas.

AFP's mission is to provide fast, comprehensive, impartial, and verified coverage of global events across all fields and formats, including video, photography, text, infographic, and audio. It collects, verifies, cross-checks, and distributes information in a neutral, factual form, intended for direct use by all types of media (radio, television, press, websites). It also serves as a source and alert service for major companies and public administrations.

AFP operates one of the world's most extensive networks of correspondents. With 2,400 employees representing 100 nationalities, it maintains an editorial presence in 260 cities across 150 countries. Its main regional headquarters are located in Nicosia, Hong Kong, Washington, D.C., and Montevideo. The agency publishes stories, videos, photos, and graphics in French, English, Arabic, Portuguese, Spanish, and German. Two-thirds of its revenue is generated from commercial activities, while the remaining one-third is funded by the French government (€113.3 million in 2022) as compensation for fulfilling its mission of general interest.

== History ==
Agence France-Presse has its origins in the Agence Havas, founded in 1835 in Paris by Charles-Louis Havas, making it the world's oldest news service. The agency pioneered the collection and dissemination of news as a commodity, and had established itself as a fully global concern by the late 19th century. Two Havas employees, Paul Julius Reuter and Bernhard Wolff, set up their own news agencies in London and Berlin respectively.

In 1940, when German forces occupied France during World War II, the news agency was taken over by the authorities and renamed "Office français d'information" (French Information Office); only the private advertising company retained the name Havas. On 20 August 1944, as Allied forces moved on Paris, a group of journalists in the French Resistance seized the offices of the FIO and issued the first news dispatch from the liberated city under the name of Agence France-Presse.

Established as a state enterprise, AFP devoted the post-war years to developing its network of international correspondents. One of them was the first Western journalist to report the death of the Soviet leader Joseph Stalin on 6 March 1953. AFP was keen to shake off its semi-official status, and on 10 January 1957, the French Parliament passed a law establishing its independence. Since that date, the proportion of the agency's revenues generated by subscriptions from government departments has steadily declined. Such subscriptions represented 115 million euros in 2011.

In 1982, the agency began to decentralize its editorial decision-making by setting up the first of its five autonomous regional centres, in Hong Kong, then a British dependent territory. Each region has its own budget, administrative director and chief editor. In September 2007, the AFP Foundation was launched to promote higher standards of journalism worldwide. The Mitrokhin Archive identified six agents and two confidential KGB contacts inside Agence France-Presse who were used in Soviet operations in France.

In 1991, AFP set up a joint venture with Extel to create a financial news service, AFX News. It was sold in 2006 to Thomson Financial. In October 2008, the Government of France announced moves to change AFP's status, including the involvement of outside investors. On 27 November of that year, the main trade unions represented in the company's home base of France – the CGT, Force Ouvrière, Syndicat national des journalistes, Union syndicale des journalistes CFDT, and SUD – launched an online petition to oppose what they saw as an attempt to privatise the agency. On 10 December 2009, the French Culture Minister Frédéric Mitterrand announced that he was setting up a Committee of Experts under former AFP CEO Henri Pigeat to study plans for the agency's future status. On 24 February 2010, Pierre Louette unexpectedly announced his intention to resign as CEO by the end of March, and move to a job with France Télécom. In November 2013, AFP and Getty Images were ordered to pay $1.2 million compensation to freelance photojournalist Daniel Morel for using his images posted on Twitter related to the 2010 Haiti earthquake without his permission, in violation of copyright and Twitter's terms of service.

AFP's statute was changed in 2015 to bring it into line with European legislation through Law No. 2015-433 of 17 April 2015. The state's financing of AFP was thus modified and was structured into two components:

- Financial compensation for the Agency's missions of general interest
- Commercial subscriptions from the State

The CEO and chairman is Fabrice Fries and the Global News Director is Phil Chetwynd. AFP returned to profitability in 2019 for the first time since 2013 and has consistently posted positive net results every year since. In 2023, the net profit reached 1.1 million euros. The debt, which stood at 50.2 million euros at the beginning of 2017, was reduced to 26.9 million euros by the end of 2023.

On 11 February 2025, Deputy News Director for Digital Strategy and Director of Communications Grégoire Lemarchand spoke at the AI in the City event at École normale supérieure, part of the AI Action Summit. Editorial Manager of the MediaLab Denis Teyssou participated in a roundtable discussion and Deputy News Director for Photo and Documentation Eric Baradat joined a panel discussion with representatives of Google, Microsoft and Imatag. On 8 May 2026, the National Communication Observatory in Niger suspended AFP due to its "repeated dissemination of content likely to seriously undermine public order, national unity, social cohesion, and the stability of republican institutions". The decision was criticised by the Committee to Protect Journalists as "censorship".

== Notable journalists ==
- Christina Assi (1995–), a Lebanese photojournalist who was seriously injured by an Israeli strike on 13 October 2023 while covering the Israel-Hamas conflict from the southern Lebanon border, according to an investigation by RSF. On 21 July 2024, Assi carried the Olympic torch in Vincennes, France, alongside her colleague, AFP videographer Dylan Collins. Assi stated that she did so to "pay tribute to those who have fallen" while working as journalists.
- Arman Soldin (1991–2023), Franco-Bosnia video journalist, killed during a rocket strike in Ukraine
- Massoud Hossaini (1981–), 2012 Pulitzer Prize winner
- Shah Marai (1977–2018), Afghan photojournalist based in Kabul, killed during a bombing attack
- Javier Manzano (1975–), 2013 Pulitzer Prize winner
- Ahmad Sardar (1974–2014), Afghan journalist, killed by the Taliban
- Michel Moutot (1961–), French journalist and writer, winner of the Albert Londres Prize in 1999
- Michèle Léridon (1958–2021), French journalist, former member of the CSA
- Sylvie Kauffmann (1955–), French journalist
- Pierre Haski (1953–), French journalist
- Kate Webb (1943–2007), New Zealand journalist
- Michel Castex (1943–), French journalist
- François de Closets (1933–), French journalist and essayist
- Bernard Cabanes (1933–1975), French journalist, victim of a bomb attack
- Paul Guihard (1932–1962), French editor and journalist based in New York, New York. Guihard was killed in the Ole Miss riot of 1962 by a bullet in the back while covering the backlash from James Meredith's attempted enrollment at the University of Mississippi. Guihard's murder remains unsolved.
- Jean Mauriac (1924–2020), French journalist and writer
- Henri de Turenne (1921–2016), French journalist and screenwriter
- Éric Schwab (1910–1977), French photojournalist
- Stan Honda, American photojournalist based in New York. Honda took the iconic photo of Marcy Borders covered in dust after the collapse of the World Trade Center.

== Distinctions ==
AFP was voted "Best News Agency" in 2021 and 2020 by the Association for International Broadcasting (AIB). Two photographers won the Pulitzer Prize for an AFP photo: Massoud Hossaini for his photo of a young girl in tears after a suicide bombing in Kabul (1st place in the category Breaking News), and Javier Manzano in 2013 for his photo of two Syrian rebel soldiers in a room lit by rays of sunlight shining through bullet holes in the wall (1st place in the category Photo Magazine). The World Press Photo of the Year has been awarded on three occasions to AFP photographers: Hocine Zaourar in 1998 for his photo of a woman in tears in front of a hospital in Algiers, Ronaldo Schemidt in 2018 for his photo of a man running while on fire during a series of riots in Caracas, and Yasuyoshi Chiba in 2020 for his photo of young protesters in Khartoum.

The Albert Londres Prize has been awarded to AFP journalists on five occasions: Patrick Meney in 1983, Sammy Ketz in 1988, AFP's Moscow office in 1995, Michel Moutot in 1999, and Emmanuel Duparcq in 2011. Five AFP collaborators have won the Rory Peck Prize: Pacôme Pabandji in 2014, Zein Al-Rifai in 2015, Will Vassilopoulos in 2016, Luis Sequeira in 2019, and Solan Kolli in 2021. The Visa d'Or (in the category News) has been awarded on four occasions to AFP photographers; Georges Gobet in 2003, Bülent Kılıç in 2015, Aris Messinis in 2016, Guillermo Arias in 2019, as well as Sameer Al-Doumy, who won the Visa d'Or Humanitaire in 2022. AFP was distinguished by the "Covering Climate Now Journalism Awards" in 2021 for photos taken by Josh Edelson and in 2022 (in the category "Video – Short Feature").

== Prizes and awards ==
In 1983, the Albert Londres Prize was awarded to Patrick Meney, who wrote a series of articles about 600 French people forcibly detained in the Gulag after World War II. In 1984, his book Les Mains coupées de la Taïga was published. In 1988, Sammy Ketz received the next Albert Londres Prize. Together with his colleague from the liberation movement, Serge Chalandon, he covered the events of the Libyan Civil War for six years.

On 17 October 2014, AFP international director Michèle Léridon received the Investigation and Reporting Award at the International Congress of Journalism and Information. Michèle Léridon was the author of the article "Covering ISIS", which was posted on the agency's blog. In December 2014, Bülent Kılıç was named Time magazine Photojournalist of the Year for his coverage of events in the Middle East and Europe. The photographer received the same acknowledgement from The Guardian newspaper.

== AFP projects ==
=== AFP Graphics ===
Since 1988, the agency has its own infographics department – AFP Graphics, which creates about 70 graphics per day. According to the agency's website, the graphics cover these topics: 31% – politics, 27% – economics, 18% – sports, 12% – society, 10% – general news, 2% – culture and media. Infographics are available in six languages: French, English, Arabic, Portuguese, Spanish and German.

=== AFP Forum ===
In 2014, Agence France-Presse launched AFP Forum, a unified Internet platform providing access to its text, photo, video, graphic, and videographic products in six languages. The platform offers over 6,000 new documents daily and includes digital archives of around 40 million items. While clients such as newspapers, broadcasters, and online media can access full services, the general public may search and view selected materials without usage rights.

=== AFP Video services ===
In July 2001, the agency announced the launch of AFP Video services, a video graphics division. Already in 2007, the agency launches AFPTV – a project in which all news from 2011 appear in HD video format. As of 2015, 200 videos in 7 languages appear on the site every day. On 10 June 2024, AFP announced the appointment of Mehdi Lebouachera as its new Global Editor-in-Chief, effective November 2024. Lebouachera succeeds Sophie Huet, who held the position since 2019 and is set to transition to a new role overseeing AFP's artificial intelligence strategy. Lebouachera previously worked as an AFP video journalist in Central America and Mexico before becoming the Video Editor-in-Chief for Latin America in Montevideo. He was later appointed Global Video Editor-in-Chief in Paris and, in September 2021, assumed the role of Editor-in-Chief for the Asia-Pacific region. He has also worked in Nicosia, Jerusalem, Gaza and Baghdad.

=== Mobile services ===
In the late 2000s, Agence France-Presse expanded its presence on mobile platforms. In partnership with the agency Momac, AFP launched AFP Mobile, a white-label service offering real-time news dispatches, photos, and videos for mobile portal publishers (including WAP and smartphone platforms such as the iPhone). According to Erik Monjalous, AFP's Commercial and Marketing Director, the publishing platform was designed to provide a complete editorial and technical solution for mobile operators. The service also introduced an innovative business model based on advertising revenue sharing, marking a shift in AFP's role from a traditional content provider to a full-fledged media company.

== Legal issues ==
In 2011, AFP was found liable for using photos taken from Twitter without the consent of their author, Haitian photographer Daniel Morel. The agency was ordered to pay $1.2 million in damages. In October 2017, AFP was found guilty of libel against the Front National. In 2016, the agency had falsely attributed fraudulent tax practices to the party in connection with the Panama Papers scandal. On 10 February 2025, one of its journalists filed a criminal complaint for workplace abuse against AFP. Separately, France’s Labor Inspectorate referred around twenty additional potential cases to prosecutors. In July 2025, a preliminary investigation was opened.

== Statutes ==
AFP operates under a 1957 law as a commercial business independent of the French government. AFP is administered by a CEO and a board comprising 15 members:

- Eight representatives of the French press;
- Two representatives of AFP personnel;
- Two representatives of Public Services radio and television;
- Three representatives of the government. One is named by the prime minister, another by the minister of finance, and a third by the minister of foreign affairs.

The mission of AFP is defined in its statute:

- Agence France-Presse may under no circumstances take account of influences or considerations liable to compromise the exactitude or the objectivity of the information it provides; it may under no circumstances fall under the control, either de facto or de jure, of any ideological, political or economic grouping;
- Agence France-Presse must, to the full extent that its resources permit, develop and enhance its organisation so as to provide French and foreign users with exact, impartial and trustworthy information on a regular and uninterrupted basis;
- Agence France-Presse must, to the full extent that its resources permit, ensure the existence of a network of facilities giving it the status of a worldwide information service.

The board elects the CEO for a renewable term of three years. AFP also has a council charged with ensuring that the agency operates according to its statutes, which mandate absolute independence and neutrality. Editorially, AFP is governed by a network of senior journalists.

=== Number of employees ===
AFP employs 2,600 staff from more than 100 nationalities, working across 150 countries and over 260 locations worldwide. The agency also operates regional hubs in six geographical zones:

- North America
- Latin America
- Europe
- Africa
- Middle East/North Africa
- Asia-Pacific

== Investments ==
Notable investments include:

- AFP GmbH
  AFP GmbH is the subsidiary of AFP in Germany, producing German-language services for local press, internet and corporate clients.
- SID
  Sport-Informations-Dienst (SID), a German-language sports service
- Citizenside
  In 2007, AFP purchased a 34% stake in Scooplive, a citizen news photo and video agency online. Established in France in 2006, Scooplive was renamed Citizenside after this investment, but AFP soon sold its shares to news aggregator Newzulu.

== See also ==
- List of news agencies
