= 2024 French protests against the National Rally =

Series of protests against the National Rally

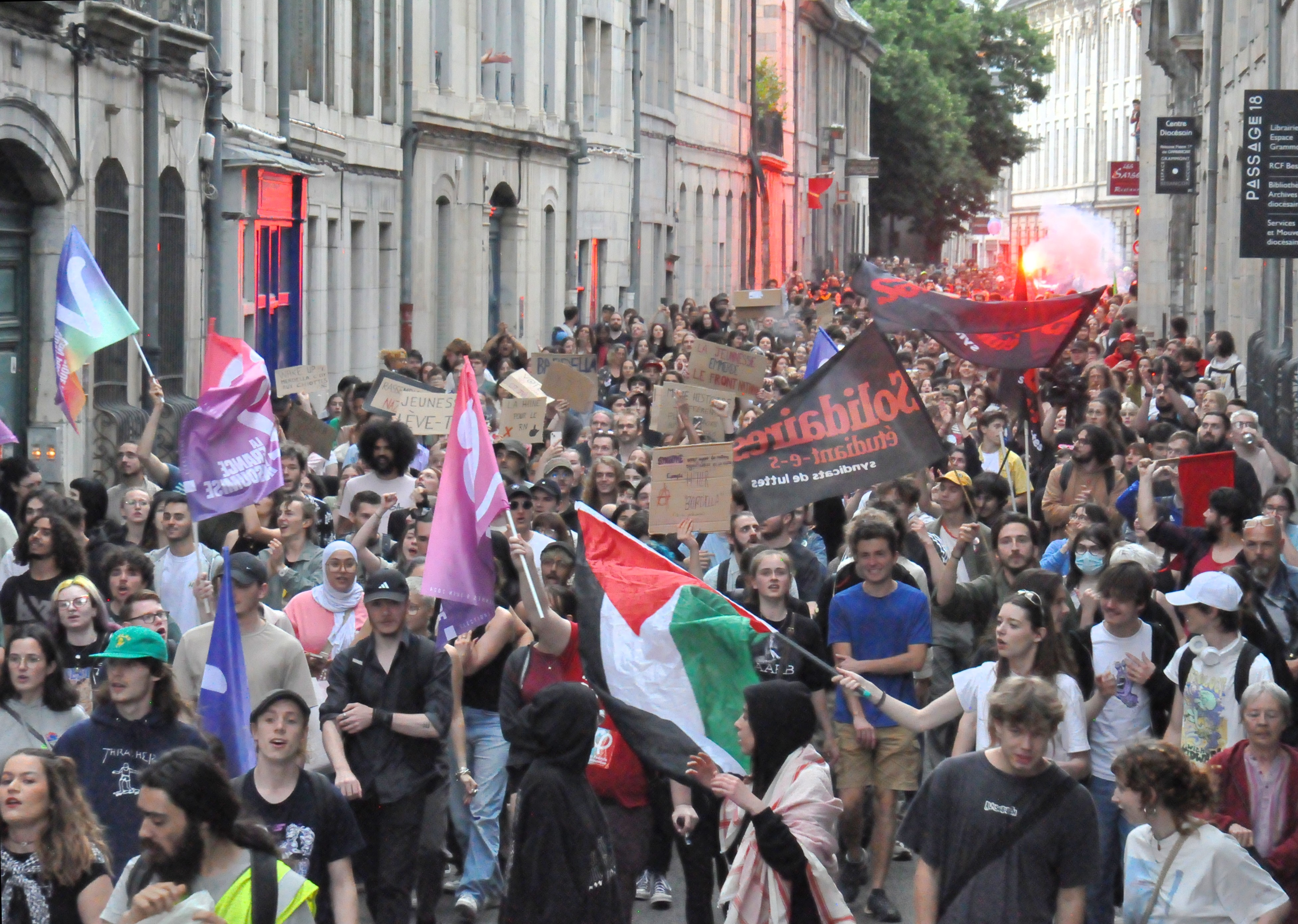
- Protest in Besançon.
- Date: 9 June 2024 – 3 July 2024 (24 days)
- Location: France
- Caused by: National Rally victory in 2024 European elections, snap 2024 legislative elections
- Goals: Prevent National Rally from achieving a majority in France's 2024 legislative elections, formation of a left-wing coalition
- Methods: Public demonstration, vandalism, rioting

Parties
Political organizations: Socialist Party; French Communist Party; The Ecologists; La France Insoumise; Unions: French Democratic Confederation of Labour; General Confederation of Labour; National Union of Autonomous Trade Unions; Fédération Syndicale Unitaire; Union syndicale Solidaires	National Rally	Renaissance

Lead figures
	Marine Le Pen; Jordan Bardella	Emmanuel Macron

Casualties
- Injuries: 10+
- Arrested: 33+
- Detained: 16+

Nationwide protests occurred in France on 9 June 2024 in response to the National Rally (RN) party's victory in the 2024 European Parliament election and the resulting dissolution of parliament and snap elections called by French President Emmanuel Macron. Several unions and left-leaning party organizations called for demonstrations across several cities in France, as well as for creating coalitions between left-leaning and far left political parties to prevent the National Rally party from achieving victory in French parliament.

== Background ==
On 9 June 2024, the National Rally party headed by Jordan Bardella, obtained 31.36% of the votes in the European parliamentary elections, causing French President Emmanuel Macron to dissolve the National Assembly and call for new legislative elections in two rounds on 30 June and 7 July 2024, to elect the 577 members of the 17th National Assembly of the Fifth French Republic.

A National Rally majority in the 2024 elections would cause France to have a far-right majority government for the first time since World War II.

== Demonstrations ==
On 9 June 2024, protests started immediately following European election results, where several hundred people demonstrated against the victory of the RN at Place de la République in Paris and called for a “union of the left” in the next legislative elections and several dozen people chanting anti-Jordan Bardella slogans in Lille. Many labor unions, student groups, human rights groups, and political parties called for rallies in order to oppose the anti-immigration and Eurosceptic policies of National Rally, and to promote "progressive alternatives for the world of work". Political parties that called for rallies included the Socialist Party, Communist Party, The Ecologists and La France Insoumise, while union groups calling for rallies included the French Democratic Confederation of Labour, the General Confederation of Labour, the Union of Autonomous Trade Unions, the Fédération Syndicale Unitaire, and the Solidaires, promoting the "largest possible" demonstrations.

Protests broke out regularly throughout June, with hundreds of thousands of people demonstrating in most of France's largest communes, including Toulouse, Marseille, Nantes, Rennes, Grenoble, Montpellier, Saint-Étienne, Bordeaux, Lyon, Strasbourg, and Orléans. On 15 June, an estimated 350,000-640,000 people protested throughout France in ~150 marches, requiring the mobilization of about 21,000 officers and leading to the arrests of seven protesters. Most protests were conducted peacefully. Many protesters carried posters with anti-racist and pro-Palestinian messages.

Several causes against National Rally policies were promoted during the marches, which included anti-fascism, environmentalism, pro-immigration and amnesty, defending democracy, increasing the minimum wage, increasing funding to healthcare, pro-LGBTQ+ rights, and pro-union causes.

== Notable protests ==
=== 10 June ===
On 10 June, 3,000 people gathered at the Place de la République in Paris, where one protester fell off the statue at the center of the plaza and required emergency care. Many young protesters chanted slogans such as "Youth piss off the National Front", "Everyone hates Marine Le Pen”, “Paris, Paris, Antifa”, and “We have passed the time of astonishment, anger and sadness, now, the next three weeks will be intense”. Several electoral signs were vandalized with slogans such as “Neither Macron, nor Bardella” and “Macron-Bardella, same fight” as thousands of protesters marched to the Ecologist Party headquarters, where left-wing parties deliberated on plans of actions for the upcoming election. The demonstrations required police to disperse the area with sting-ball grenades before midnight, with the remaining protesters dispersing peacefully.

6,200 people protested in Toulouse, where protesters seized construction equipment, broke windows, and burnt trash cans before they were dispersed with tear gas, with two people arrested. 2,800 protesters in Lyon were blocked from crossing a bridge linking to Vieux Lyon, a UNESCO World Heritage Site and stronghold of the ultra-right, by a police cordon using tear gas to disperse the crowd. A bar linked to the far-right in Angers was attacked and damaged by masked activists in black clothing and hoodies.

About 120 high-school students gathered around the main entrance of the Henri IV High School, an establishment where Macron studied at. They shouted slogans such as "Macron you're screwed, your high school is in the street" and "So, so, solidarity with immigrants and undocumented immigrants". They also harshly criticized Macron's abrupt decision to call for snap elections.

Concurrently, over 1,000 Nantes protesters marched under a banner stating "revolution or barbarism". A protester climbed up a building to take down a French flag hanging from the window of an apartment, causing applause from a crowd displaying union and far-left symbols. The activists also stoned the window of the apartment where the flag was hanging and set trash cans on fire.

In Bordeaux, the Le Saint-Projet bar was "violently vandalized" by a group of about ten people by throwing furniture and destroying windows due to claims of it hosting far-right members from the Bordeaux Bastide organization. In the evening, the First Gothic Church of Guyenne was stormed by protesters after forcing an entrance door open. Father Grégory Lutz-Wiest claimed that protesters threw plates and cutlery from a soup kitchen for the homeless onto the square before tagging the outside of the building with the phrase “Morts aux FAFs” (English: Death to the "France for the French").

=== 11–18 June ===
On 12 June in Lille, about 700 mostly young demonstrators marched with a weekly procession of undocumented immigrants in solidarity. Several hundred people defied demonstration bans in Toulouse, with at least one protester arrested.

On 14 June in Lyon, about 3,500 people gathered on the Place des Terreaux in a demonstration set up by 65 organizations, with many protesters carrying Palestinian flags. A few small explosions occurred, and ACAB tags were painted on the public square walls, while the facade of the Lyon Town Hall was also tagged. Several people wearing hoods and dark glasses damaged the McDonald's on Place Bellecour. Three police officers were reported injured after clashes took place on the Bonaparte Bridge, where protesters threw mortars, leading police to fire tear gas causing most of the procession to dissipate as four law enforcement vans and several police officers blocked the remaining protesters.

On June 15, nearly 200 rallies and demonstrations were organized by several associations and five unions: the CFDT, the CGT, the UNSA, the FSU, and the Solidaires. 175,000 people participated in regional marches and 75,000 people marched in Paris, with claims of 640,000 demonstrators mobilizing throughout France. Five Internal Security Forces members were injured in Paris, and 20 arrests were recorded with 16 taken into police custody, including nine arrests in Paris with five in custody.

On 18 June, several Freemason denominations collectively launched demonstrations in different cities across the country, including several hundred at Place Vauban in Paris, denouncing the far-right's attacks on fundamental values that define French society, including republicanism, secularism, and egalitarianism.

=== 19–29 June ===
On 19 June, a thousand people gathered in Place de la Croix-Rousse in Lyon, marching to Place des Terreaux, Place de la République, and Place des Cordeliers. Three arrests were made and two minor injuries were reported, while several graffiti tags, trash fires, and other damage occurred.

=== During 2024 elections ===
==== 30 June ====
On 30 June, thousands of left-wing protesters gathered at the Place de la République in Paris to protest the results of the first round of the 2024 legislative election where National Rally held the largest number of votes. The New Popular Front distributed flags to protesters bearing the colors of the alliance. Representatives of the New Popular Front Jean-Luc Mélenchon, Mathilde Panot, and Manuel Bompard spoke to the crowd. Jean-Luc Mélenchon stated that their party was the only one capable of beating National Rally, and that being French represented a "political contract" not bound by religion or skin color, or language, thus making the French "an unfinished people, whose horizon line will constantly recede, and behind which we will always have to run while creolizing ourselves" and that “It’s them or us! There is nothing in the middle”. Many activists called him a "social traitor " as he made his speech for withdrawing deputies in certain constituencies to block the National Rally from winning seats. However, Mélenchon was also met with positive cheers. The leader of the Socialist Party, Olivier Faure, was booed lightly when he entered the stage, while Le France Insoumise leader Manuel Bompard's speech provoked loud applause. Many protesters openly criticized the party's withdrawal of candidates in certain constituencies where they fell behind Renaissance in voting.

Several of the protesters carried Palestinian flags and wore keffiyehs in solidarity with Palestine, with one vendor selling them near a metro exit. Many protesters chanted slogans in favor of Palestine and decrying Israel's war crimes, such as "he who sows haagrah reaps intifada.” Protesters took out and mounted a banner that paid tribute to victim of police brutality Nahel Merzouk on the base of the statue in the middle of the square. Several protesters chanted slogans such as “Everyone hates the police”, “Justice for Nahel ”, and “We are all anti-fascists”.

Following the New Popular Front speeches at the Place de la République shortly after midnight, the demonstrators left the square. There were no instances of confrontations, violence, or other disturbances during the protest aside from graffiti tagged in the square. As protesters left the square, several trash cans were overturned, windows were broken at a McDonalds on Rue du Faubourg du Temple, fireworks were fired, and a bank branch was damaged as the group passed by Avenue Parmentier, with police firing tear gas grenades at the group.

In Lyon, police sources claimed that several "far-left" elements were engaged in confrontations with police at the Place Bellecour, where at least 800 protesters gathered. Police and eyewitnesses reported the presence of mortar fire, erected barricades, vandalism of a storefront, and "attacks on the town hall".

In Nantes, a spontaneous demonstration took place following the announcement of election results, which proceeded peacefully aside from reported "throws of projectiles". The demonstration ended after police fired tear gas into the crowd, forcing the demonstrators to disperse. Several of them were caught off guard by the tear gas volley and did not have time to put on their helmets as they fled the alley.

In Strasbourg, 200 to 300 people gathered at Place Broglie.

In Poitiers, 300 people demonstrated in front of the prefecture in response to a call from the Young Communists.

In Lille, dozens of people chanted "La justice emmerde le Front national" as they marched down rue Faidherbe. The demonstration went off without a hitch.

In Rennes, almost 300 people demonstrate in Place Sainte-Anne. Anti-fascist chants were heard. A few garbage can fires caused a disturbance, which was quickly extinguished by the police, who cleared the square.

==== 1 July ====
In Saint-Nazaire, in response to a call from left-wing unions and associations, almost 200 people gathered in front of the town hall.

In Bayonne, a demonstration called by the Solidaires 64 union drew nearly 400 people in front of the town hall.

In Brest, 80 people demonstrated in Place de la Liberté.

In Toulouse, an undeclared demonstration gathered around 900 people.

==== 2 July ====
In Rennes, around 450 demonstrators gathered on the esplanade de Gaulle.

In Chambéry, some 650 people demonstrated against the far right and racism.

==== 3 July ====
Several thousand people gather at Place de la République in Paris. Among the demonstrators were artists such as Étienne de Crécy, Piche and Zaho de Sagazan, who were due to perform on site. Speeches by various personalities, including actresses Judith Godrèche and Josiane Balasko, journalist Rokhaya Diallo, writer Annie Ernaux, singer Juliette Armanet, former European deputy Jacques Toubon and environmental activist Cyril Dion, are also scheduled. Also in Paris, a banner reading "Pétain t'as oublié tes chiens" (Pétain you forgot your dogs) was unfurled in front of the National Rally headquarters by some sixty musicians from the Orchestre du Nouveau Monde, who had come to play a parody of Maréchal, nous voilà !.

In Châteaubriant, several hundred people demonstrated.

In Chauny, around sixty people demonstrated outside the office of RN deputy José Beaurain.

In Briançon, around 100 people demonstrated.

In Avignon, several hundred people demonstrated in response to an inter-union call.

In the Drôme departement, several rallies were held in Valence, Montélimar, Nyons and Romans-sur-Isère.

== Reactions ==
On 14 June, National Rally leader Jordan Bardella called for "appeasement" and emphasized the importance of respecting the results of democratic elections. He described the calls for rebellion and insurrection as extremely dangerous and highlighted his commitment to freedom of expression and democracy. Bardella urged all political parties, including left-wing groups, to promote peaceful and non-violent demonstrations.

Tangi Marion, the National Rally candidate for the Fougères constituency of Ille-et-Vilaine, responded to anti-far right protests in the region on 15 June by emphasizing the importance of respecting democratic outcomes, and criticized the left for contesting the European election results. He highlighted that over 40% of employees voted for Jordan Bardella in the European elections and reiterated the need for civil peace and mutual respect among voters. He also labeled several labor reforms promoted by the party as "confiscation of the fruits of the work provided by the French to finance untenable promises." He also criticized the absence of French flags at the demonstrations and what he called violent, anti-Semitic, and anti-police slogans, which he claimed dishonored the left.

French journalist Vincent Trémolet de Villers called the protests held in Paris after the first round of elections a "reflex gesture from the militant left".

Several businesses and shops in several different metropolitan areas such as Lyon, Grenoble, Rennes, and Paris barricaded their storefronts to protect their establishments in anticipation of the results of the first round of elections, including stores that were damaged in prior demonstrations. Several shopkeepers and business owners also set up a WhatsApp group to keep store owners up to date with developments during the election and the locations of demonstrations.

== See also ==
- History of far-right movements in France
- 2024 social unrest in Martinique
- 2024 German anti-extremism protests—similar protests against right-wing extremism in Germany.
- Protests against Emmanuel Macron
- 2023 French pension reform strikes
- 2022 French protests
- 2019–2020 French pension reform strike
- 2006 youth protests in France
