= 2019–2020 French pension reform strike =

- Part of protests against Emmanuel Macron
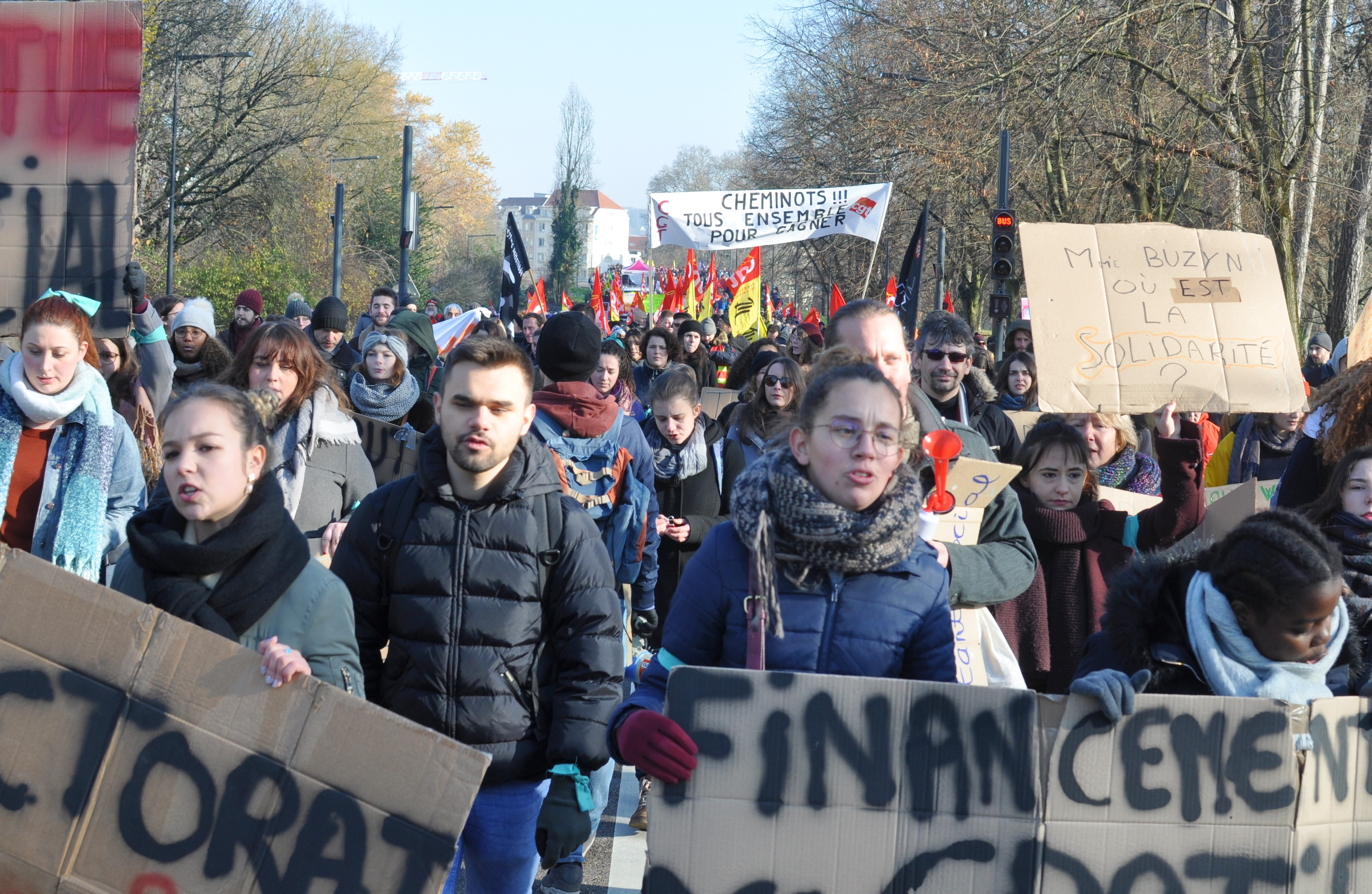
- Date: 5 December 2019 – 20 February 2020 (2 months, 2 weeks and 1 day)
- Location: France
- Caused by: French pension reform proposal
- Goals: Withdrawal of French pension reform proposals Anti-government; Anti-capitalism
- Methods: Strike action; Protest; Barricades; Blocking traffic; Disabling traffic; Rioting; Offering free service
- Status: Ongoing

Parties
Gilets jaunes CGT; FO; SUD; FSU; Gauche révolutionnaire CFE-CGC; CNT-F; French Antifa; Anarchist Revolutionaries	(France) Government; National Police; CRS; National Gendarmerie

Lead figures
	(France) Emmanuel Macron; President of the French Republic Édouard Philippe; Prime Minister of France (France) Christophe Castaner; Minister of Interior

A strike began on 5 December 2019 to protest against broad changes to France's pension system proposed by President Emmanuel Macron. Reforming the pensions was one of President Macron's promises and there are three primary proposals of the pension reform plan. The first is to create a universal state retirement plan, which would replace the 42 individual retirement plans that exist in France. The second is a "points system", to give a pension in proportion to the contributions paid. The third is to "improve the pensions of the most disadvantaged." The result of the system would increase the retirement age of many jobs in France.

The 2019 French pension reform plan follows the prior pension reforms in 1993, 2003, 2010, and 2013, but is far more comprehensive in that rather than adjusting the system. In September 2017, Jean-Paul Delevoye was appointed as High Commissioner for Pension Reforms, and was ordered to review the pensions system. In July 2019, he delivered a report of his recommendations, outlining the basics of a bill to be proposed to the National Assembly for pension reform. He resigned on 16 December after the press revealed he forgot to disclose 13 volunteer activities including a remunerated one for the French Federation of Insurances. Jean-Paul Delevoye was replaced by Laurent Pietraszewski, former employee of the French multinational retail group Auchan. If the bill becomes law, it will only come into force in 2025.

Government ministers have claimed that the pension reforms will simplify a complex system, as well as making it fairer. Unions claim that the system will increase inequality between pensions and decrease the general level of the pensions.

This is the longest strike in modern French history. After a month of protest, polling reported in January 2020 a 61% support in favour of the strikes in the French population.

== Background ==
The strikes, led in part by the CGT but also by the UNSA, the FSU and Solidaires unions, began prior to the disclosure of the details of President Emmanuel Macron's plan to merge France's current 42 different pension schemes into one state-managed system. The French government maintains that merging the variety of profession dependent schemes is crucial. Unions say introducing a single system will mean millions of workers will end up working beyond the legal retirement age of 62 or receiving a far lower pension.

== Project ==
The project itself was officially announced on 11 December 2019. The mandatory impact study of the reform is to be released on 24 January with the submission of the project to the ministers. The government opted for an accelerated procedure with a submission to the House on 17 February.

The new system will essentially work in the following way:

- Workers will buy points and the number of points earned by year will depend on their salaries;
- The amount of money devoted to buying the points will correspond to 28% of their salary, 17% being paid by the employer and 9% by the employee;
- The part of the salary above €10,000 (equivalent to US$11,148 and £8,569) per month will not give points but still 2.3% of it will contribute to the pension fund;
- The buying value of a point may vary and will be decided by the State;
- Once the legal age is reached, points will be converted into pensions;
- The value of a point upon conversion in pension may vary and will be decided by the State;
- Additional points can be earned for years of maternity/paternity leave.

The new system is criticised because of its differences with the current system:

- it is impossible to predict the amount of a pension because it depends on the value of the point, which can vary over time;
- because the pensions are calculated over the whole career and not only the best years, it will create more heterogeneity between pensions as is currently the case in Germany;
- decreasing the maximum salary threshold from €29,000 (equivalent to US$32,329 and £24,858) to €10,000 will decrease the income of the pension fund by 4.9 billion euros (equivalent to 5.5 billion dollars and 4.2 billion pounds) per year;
- imposing that the pension fund represents more than 14% of the NGP will decrease pensions.

Initially designed to create a unique pension funds system in France, following the protest of the unions, the project has introduced 8 special plans for policemen, aeroplane pilots and stewards, train drivers, firemen, jailmen, truck drivers, fishermen and teachers. These plans were introduced to avoid strikes in critical sectors (police, air traffic) or to try to end ongoing strikes.

French information website France 24 reported that women may be the "biggest losers" with the pension reform.

== Actions ==
Strikes began on 5 December 2019 as more than 30 unions launched strike actions with the intention to shut down the country and force President Emmanuel Macron to reevaluate his plans for pension reform. Actions resulted in the Eiffel Tower being shut down along with most of the light rail lines in Paris. 6000 police were deployed in Paris alone in anticipation of the protests, particularly around the Élysée Palace which was barricaded.

The protests became violent in the east of Paris where protesters were seen lighting fires and smashing windows.

The police reported 65,000 people had demonstrated in Paris, while the CGT labour union suggested 250,000 people had turned out. While across the country the Interior Ministry said more than 800,000 people were protesting the CGT said the figure was 1.5 million.

Strikes and protests continued on 6 December as unions said there would be no let-up. While some schools reopened, almost all high-speed train services were cancelled, most of the Paris metro remained shut down, and hundreds of flights were cancelled.

Transport across the country remained paralysed on 8 December as strikes by state rail company SNCF and Parisian public transport group RATP continued into their fourth day. Unions announced they were planning another large demonstration on 10 December.

On 12 December French Prime Minister Édouard Philippe unveiled the government's proposal for raising the retirement age from 62 to 64 and harmonizing the 42 different retirement schedules. The next day, the CFDT announced that it would be calling for its members to join the demonstrations on 17 December.

To protest against the loss of their special regime, ballerinas from the Paris Opera performed Swan Lake in frontcourt of Palais Garnier on 23 December.

Union workers from the electricity company EDF conducted operations to cut power of symbolic companies such as Amazon or deputies from Emmanuel Macron's party LREM, while also performing "Robin Hood" operations to put electricity back on to homes unable to pay their bills.

In Caen, on 8 January 2020, dozens of lawyers threw their robes in front of the ministry of justice Nicole Belloubet as a sign of protest. Lawyers are also on strike protesting against the destruction of their profitable pension regime.

During union demonstrations, the level of violence exhibited by the police, as already condemned by the United Nations during the yellow vests demonstrations, was extremely high with videos allegedly reporting a police officer firing point-blank at the protesters with a riot control gun on 9 January.

On 25 January, French firefighters joined the protests. People rally on the street with Hong Kong anarchist flags, Antifa and Palestinian flags while together sang "L'Internationale" then shouted "Overthrow Capitalism!"; "Revolution now!" and there were several violent clashes with the police.

== Conflicts of interests ==
Jean-Paul Delevoye, the High Commissioner for Pension Reforms, was revealed to be funded by the French Federation of Insurances, which has a direct interest in the pension reform. Moreover, being funded by a private company while being a member of the government is illegal according to the French constitution.

Articles have also pointed out the proximity between Emmanuel Macron and BlackRock, one of the world's largest asset management funds, which is interested in having the billions of euros of the French pension fund enter the financial market. Multiple meetings between the French government and the firm's representatives have been reported. The promotion of the head of BlackRock's French branch, Jean-Francois Cirelli, to rank of officer of the Légion d'honneur also contributed to highlight this proximity.

== Reactions ==
French President Emmanuel Macron stated that the nationwide strikes would not weaken his resolve to reform the pension system. The workers and most unions are not backing off either.

Polling indicated a strong support of the population in favour of the strikes. According to the conservative newspaper Le Figaro, on 19 December 55% of French people found the movement against the pension reform justified. Two weeks later, in what had become the longest French strike over the last 50 years, 61% still found the movement justified.

Crowdfunding initiatives to support the strikes have flourished with a national one collecting more than 2 million euros.

Macron has delayed the unveiling of the new plan until January 10, 2023.

== See also ==
- 1995 strikes in France
- 2010 French pension reform strikes
- 2024 French protests against the far-right
- Protests against Emmanuel Macron
- Yellow Vest protests
