= French Labour Court elections =

Former electoral process

The French Labour Court elections (French: Élections prud'homales françaises) were held every five years to elect the lay judges, known as conseillers prud'homaux, who arbitrate labour disputes within the Conseil de prud'hommes (French Labour Court), a specialized court tasked with resolving conflicts between employees and employers governed by labour law.

The elections were abolished in 2014. The last elections took place in 2008, and the final elected mandate of councilors concluded on 31 December 2017.

== Purpose ==
The Labour Court elections served as a mechanism to select nearly 15,000 lay judges who represented the interests of both employees and employers in disputes over employment contracts, dismissals, or other labour-related conflicts. The elections were also a means to measure the influence of trade unions and employer organizations based on their electoral support.

== Process ==
The elections were organized as proportional representation lists, with separate colleges for employees and employers. The employee college consisted of candidates representing trade unions, while employer organizations fielded candidates for the employer college. Voting was open to individuals aged 16 or older who were employed or job-seeking under the French labour code, including foreign workers.

The elected councilors served five-year terms, with the presidency and vice-presidency of the courts alternating annually between representatives of employees and employers to maintain parity.

== 2008 elections ==
The 2008 elections marked the last instance of the process. Voter turnout was notably low, with 74.5% of employees and 68.5% of employers abstaining from voting. This low participation, along with the high cost of organizing the elections (estimated at €91.6 million), contributed to calls for reform.

== Abolition ==
In 2014, the French Parliament passed a law abolishing the direct election of Labour Court councilors. Since 2018, councilors have been appointed jointly by the Minister of Justice and Minister of Labour, based on lists submitted by representative professional organizations. This change followed a transitional period that extended the mandate of the 2008-elected councilors until 31 December 2017.

The abolition was part of broader labour reforms aimed at simplifying administrative processes and reducing costs.

== Results ==
=== Employee college ===
All sections combined, as a percentage of votes cast. Ranking: 2008

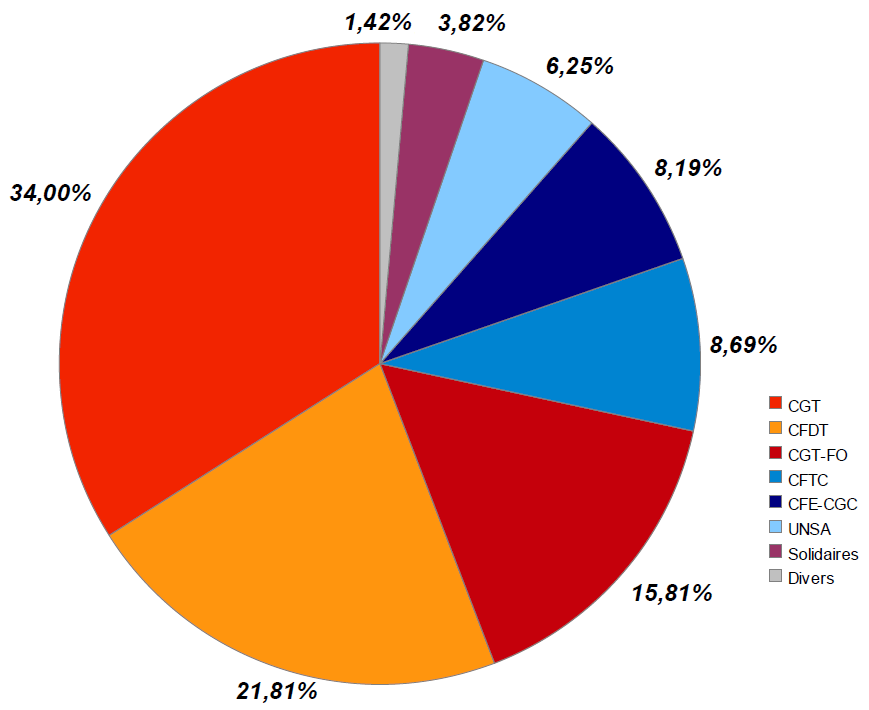
Results in 2008

Trade unions	1987	1992	1997	2002	2008
CGT	36.35	33.35	33.11	32.13	34.00%
CFDT	23.06	23.81	25.35	25.23	21.81%
CGT-FO	20.50	20.46	20.55	18.28	15.81%
CFTC	8.30	8.58	7.53	9.65	8.69%
CFE-CGC	7.44	6.95	5.93	7.01	8.19%
UNSA	–	0.14	0.72	4.99	6.25%
Solidaires	–	0.45	0.32	1.51	3.82 %
CSL (dissolved in 2002)	2.30	4.40	4.22	–	–
FGSOA	0.21	–	–	–	–
Other	1.84	1.81	2.27	1.19	1.42%

The Groupe des Dix, now known as Union syndicale Solidaires, is an interprofessional union alliance that includes unions such as the SNJ, SNUI, and SUD-PTT.

== Legacy ==
The elections were historically significant as a reflection of labour relations and trade union strength in France. Despite their discontinuation, the Conseil de prud'hommes continues to operate as a key institution for resolving individual labour disputes, with councilors now selected through a nomination process.
