= Jean Mauriac =

French writer and journalist (1924–2020)

- Born: 15 August 1924; Paris, France
- Died: 24 August 2020 (aged 96); Paris, France
- Occupations: Writer; Journalist

Jean Mauriac (15 August 1924 – 24 August 2020) was a French writer and journalist.

== Biography ==
Jean was the son of writer François Mauriac and Jeanne Mauriac. He was also the brother of writer Claude, Claire, and Luce Mauriac.

Jean Mauriac joined the Agence France-Presse as a political journalist in 1944, and reported on Charles de Gaulle until the general's retirement in 1969.

Mauriac died on 24 August 2020 in Paris at the age of 96.

== Memoirs of Gaullism ==
In 2006, at the age of 82, Mauriac released a collection of comments from Gaullist political figures.

- "Gaullism, this great adventure started on 18 June 1940, was fatal. It is its degeneration that Jean Mauriac traces in this relentless and, frankly, demoralizing book. Five hundred pages of confidences collected over three decades from the heirs, who recount their rivalries, their recurrent hatred and their blindness, interspersed with rare flashes of lucidity." – Le Monde
- "It is a psychodrama of jealousy and quarrelsome ambitions which seizes, the day after the departure of the General, of those who served him, and which will be further exacerbated, five years later, with the death of Pompidou, around the rivalry between Chaban and Giscard; rallying to the latter being even more badly perceived, and with more reasons, than those from which Pompidou could benefit." – Le Figaro

== Works ==
- Malagar (1998)
- Mort du général de Gaulle (1972)
- L'après-de Gaulle. Notes confidentielles 1969-1989 (2006)
- Le Général et le journaliste, conversations avec Jean-Luc Barré (2008)
