= Bülent Kılıç =

Turkish photojournalist

Bülent Kılıç (born 1979) is a Turkish photojournalist currently employed by the Agence France-Press (AFP) as the photo manager for Turkey.

== Journalistic career ==
In the early 2000s he was a journalist for the local Turkish press, later specializing as a photographer. He began to work as a freelance journalist for AFP around 2003. In Ukraine, he covered the Ukrainian revolution, the search for survivors of the Malaysia airlines plane crash and the refugees fleeing the clashes between the pro-Russian militias and the Ukrainian military. In Turkey, he covered the Soma coal mine disaster, the aftermath of the funeral of Berkin Elvan, and the Kurdish Peshmerga passing through Sanliurfa on their way to defend Kobanî in Syria against the Islamic State of Iraq and the Levant. During the annual Pride parade in Istanbul in 2021, he was briefly detained.

=== Photographic style ===
According to his own statement, his work has been influenced by the photographers Yuri Kozyrev and Robert Capa.

== Personal life ==
He is married and has one son.

== Recognition ==
- 2014 Exhibition Visa pour l'Image in Perpignan.
- 2014 Guardian photographer of the year.
- 2014 Time Wire Photographer of the year.
- 2015 1st in the section Spot News at the World Press Photo of the Year awards for his photograph of a wounded girl surrounded by Turkish police in the aftermath of the funeral of Berkin Evan and also the 3rd prize for his photograph documenting air strikes on militants of the Islamic State of Iraq and the Levant (ISIL).
- 2015 Finalist for the Pulitzer Prize for his photographs documenting the flight of the Kurds from the ISIL.
