= Fabrice Fries =

French business executive (born 1960)

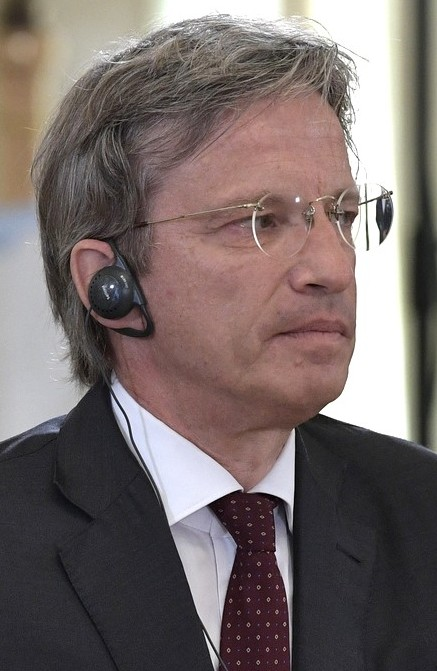
- Fabrice Fries in June 2019 at a meeting in Moscow between Vladimir Putin and executives of the world's major news agencies.
- Born: March 1960 (age 66); Lyon, France
- Education: École normale supérieure (1980 - 1983) Institut d'études politiques de Paris (1982) École nationale d'administration (1984 – 1986)
- Occupations: Chairman and Chief Executive Officer of Agence France-Presse since April 2018

Fabrice Fries (born March 11, 1960) is a French business executive, currently chairman and chief executive officer of Agence France-Presse.

He previously held various managerial positions in media companies such as Vivendi, Havas and Publicis Groupe.

== Education ==
Fries studied at the École normale supérieure (higher education in humanities), Institut d'études politiques de Paris and École nationale d'administration (class "Denis-Diderot" of 1985). He also holds a master's degree in history from Sorbonne University.

== Career ==
After graduating from the Ecole Nationale d'Administration, Fabrice Fries joined the French Court of Auditors, as an auditor, before moving to the private office of Jacques Delors, president of the European of Commission.

In 1995, he became the special advisor to the Compagnie Générale des Eaux (now Vivendi) Chairman and CEO, Jean-Marie Messier.

In 1997, he was appointed Head of Strategy & Development of Havas, where he refocused of the group's activities on publishing and press. After Havas' take-over by Vivendi in 1998, it was renamed Vivendi Universial Publishing and Fabrice Fries became its Deputy General Director, in charge of the press and professional information divisions, working with brands such as L'Express, L'Expansion, Courrier international, Dalloz, Masson, Vidal, Le Moniteur, L'Usine nouvelle, L'Etudiant, Exposium, 01 Informatique, le Quotidien du Médecin, as well as several health information brands worldwide.

In 2002, Fries was in charge of the sale of those assets by Vivendi to investment funds Cinven, Carlyle and Apax.

In 2004, he joined Atos, an IT services company, as Group Senior Vice-President, in charge of key accounts and market strategy.

In 2006, he was appointed General Secretary and member of the executive committee of Publicis Groupe, the third biggest communications group worldwide. In June 2009, he became head of Publicis Consultants, a Publicis Group agency specialising in corporate and crisis communications. On April 12, 2018, he became the chairman and chief executive officer of Agence France-Presse (AFP), one of the world's leading press agencies.

Since taking the helm in 2018, Fries has contributed to AFP’s financial growth with a transformation plan that places a particular emphasis on the Agency’s video and photo services. AFP has continued to diversify its revenues under Fries’ leadership with its fact-checking service, which saw an increase in demand during the COVID-19 pandemic with the surge of disinformation surrounding the disease. He is an advocate of neighbouring rights for the press in the face of Google, which he deems a “just fight”, and even "a personal mission, because it is not normal that those that simply relay news profit from it."

Fabrice Fries had to answer questions before a Senate’s committee in November 2023 regarding AFP’s coverage of the war between Israel and Hamas following October 7, with drew international criticism. He was forced to concede misjudgment on the coverage of the first screening of the massacres.

On February 10, 2025, AFP and Fabrice Fries, its legal representative, was hit with a criminal complaint for workplace abuse filed by one of its journalists, along with a report to prosecutors from the Labor Inspectorate covering twenty potential other possible cases.

== Personal life ==
Fries is married to Fabrizia Benini, a senior European civil servant at the European Commission (DG CONNECT) and has two daughters. He is the brother of Charles Fries, a French diplomat, currently French ambassador to Turkey.

== Publications ==
- L'emprise du faux, Éditions de l'Observatoire, 2021.
- Les Grands Débats européens, Éditions du Seuil, 1995.
