= 2010 French pension reform strikes =

General strikes and demonstrations

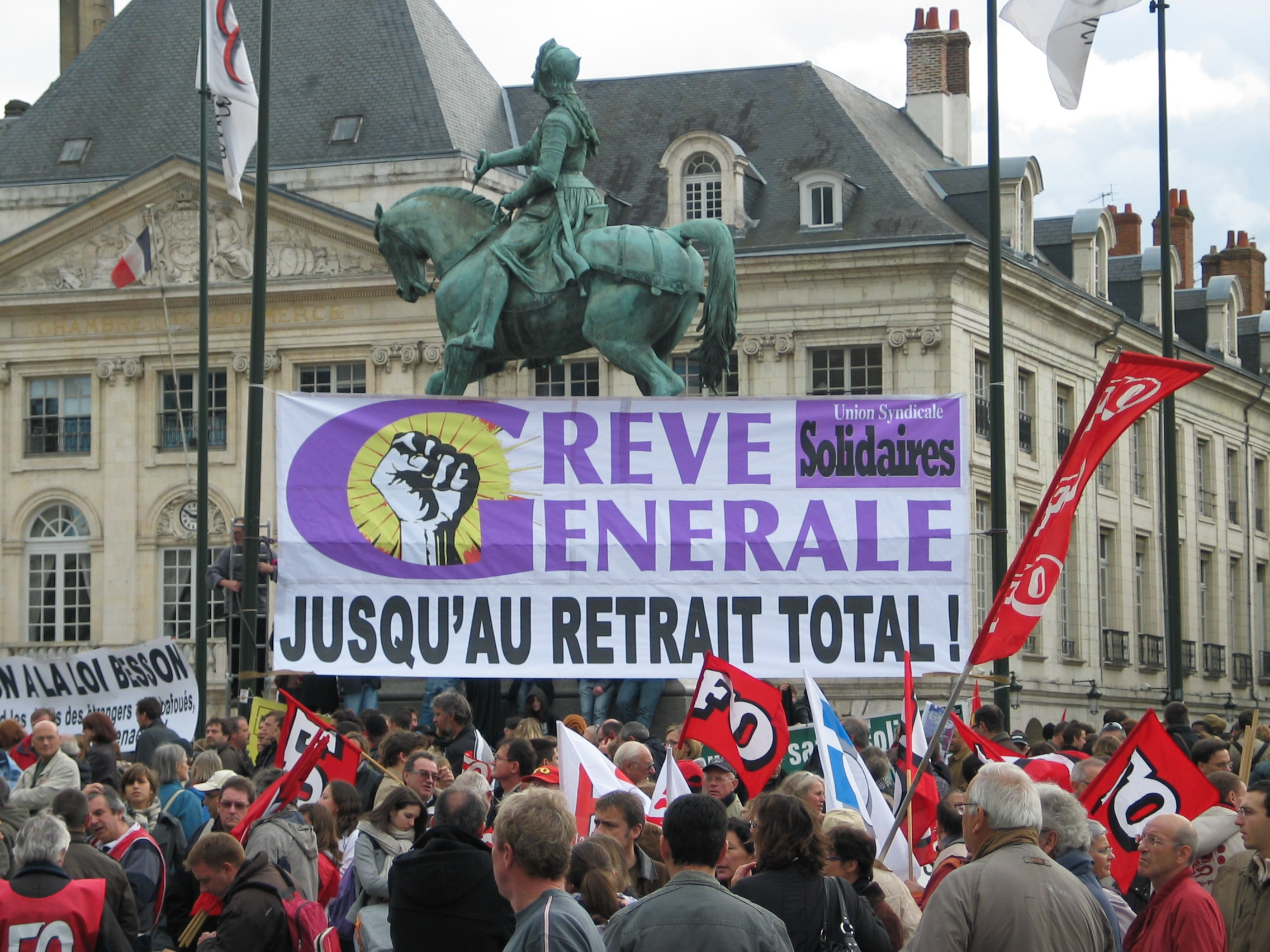
The French Union Solidaires protesting in the Place du Martroi in Orléans

The 2010 pension reform strikes in France were a series of general strikes and demonstrations which occurred in France throughout September and October 2010.

They involved union members from both the private and public sectors protesting in cities, including Bordeaux, Lille, Lyon, Marseille, Paris, Toulouse, Montpellier and Strasbourg, against a proposal by the French government to raise the normal retirement age for public pensions from 65 to 67 and early reduced pensions from age 60 to 62, which the Assemblée nationale has approved, while temporary pre-crisis taxes cuts are maintained for the benefit of the richest individuals and companies, and top government officials are subject to an ongoing corruption inquiry. Those who object to the changes say the poorest will be most affected by them.

The strikes have led to a reduction in public transport services, motorway blockages by lorry drivers and disruption to oil deliveries to refineries leading to a national fuel shortage. French students also joined the workers in the protests with barricades being built at around 400 high schools across the country in order to try to prevent other pupils attending classes.

The strikes have been compared to the popularly supported 1995 strikes in France, with 70% of respondents to one poll suggesting the 2010 strikes would swell into a national movement akin to 1995, and a majority expressing support for such an event. CGT secretary Bernard Thibault, one of the main trade union leaders, commented to La Chaîne Info: "There have never since 1995 been as many protesters ... from both the public and private sectors, and now from all generations. The government is betting on this movement deteriorating, even breaking down. I think we have the means to disappoint them."

== Reasons for the strikes ==
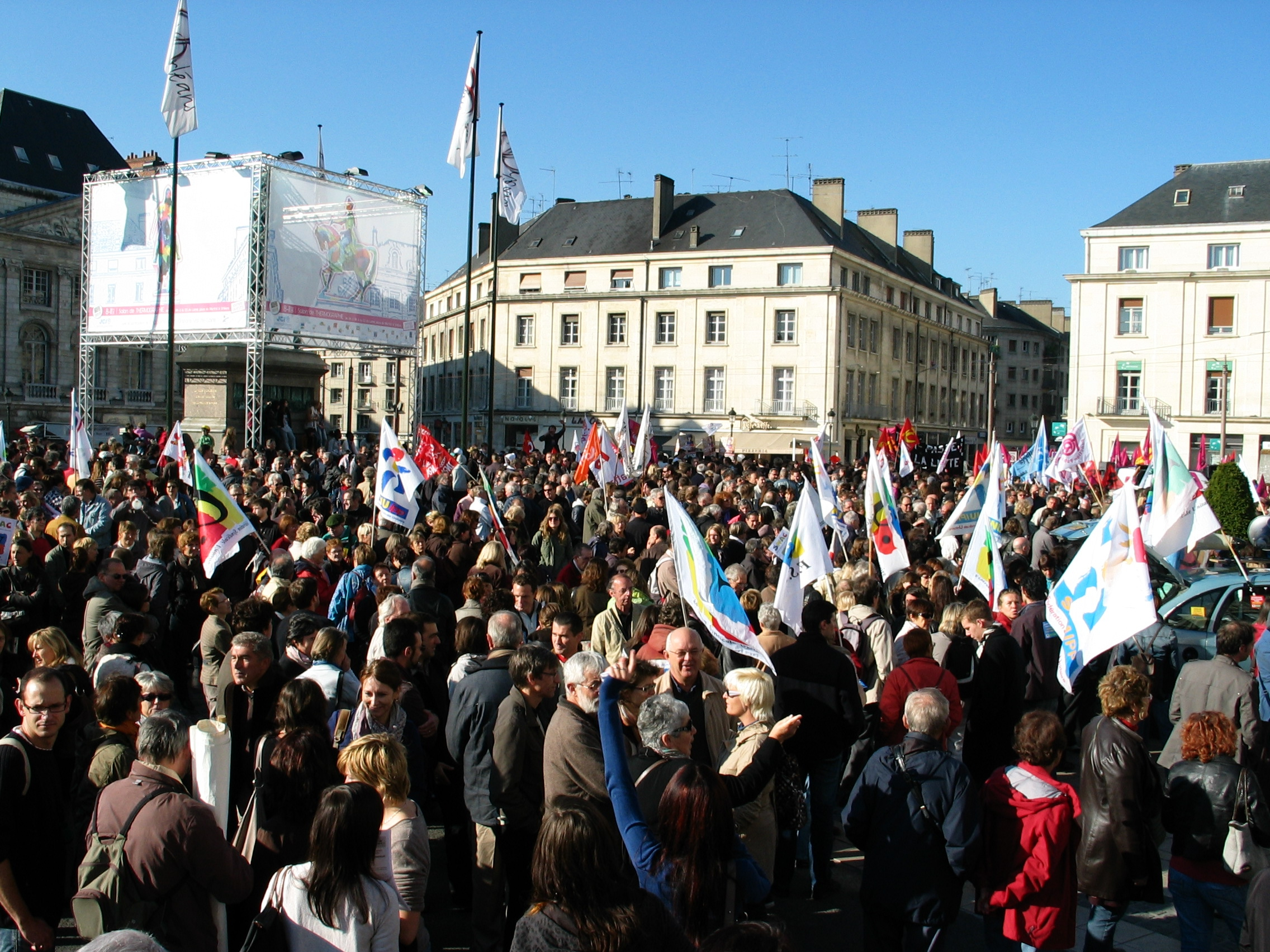
Demonstration in Orléans, 12 October

In 2007, the French government undertook a general review of its public policies (see French General Review of Public Policies) and one of the key proposals made in order to reduce government expenditure includes postponing the national retirement age.

=== Immediate ===
In 1983, François Mitterrand's government reduced the retirement age from 65 to 60. The current government plans to raise the normal retirement age for public pensions from 65 to 67 and early reduced pensions from age 60 to 62. This may allow a reduction in public spending. Some people in the working population are opposed to this change. Workers' associations thus organized several strikes.

=== Longer-term ===
The size of the strikes also reflects a broader discontent with Sarkozy, with dissatisfaction and mistrust in the government approach for several reasons.

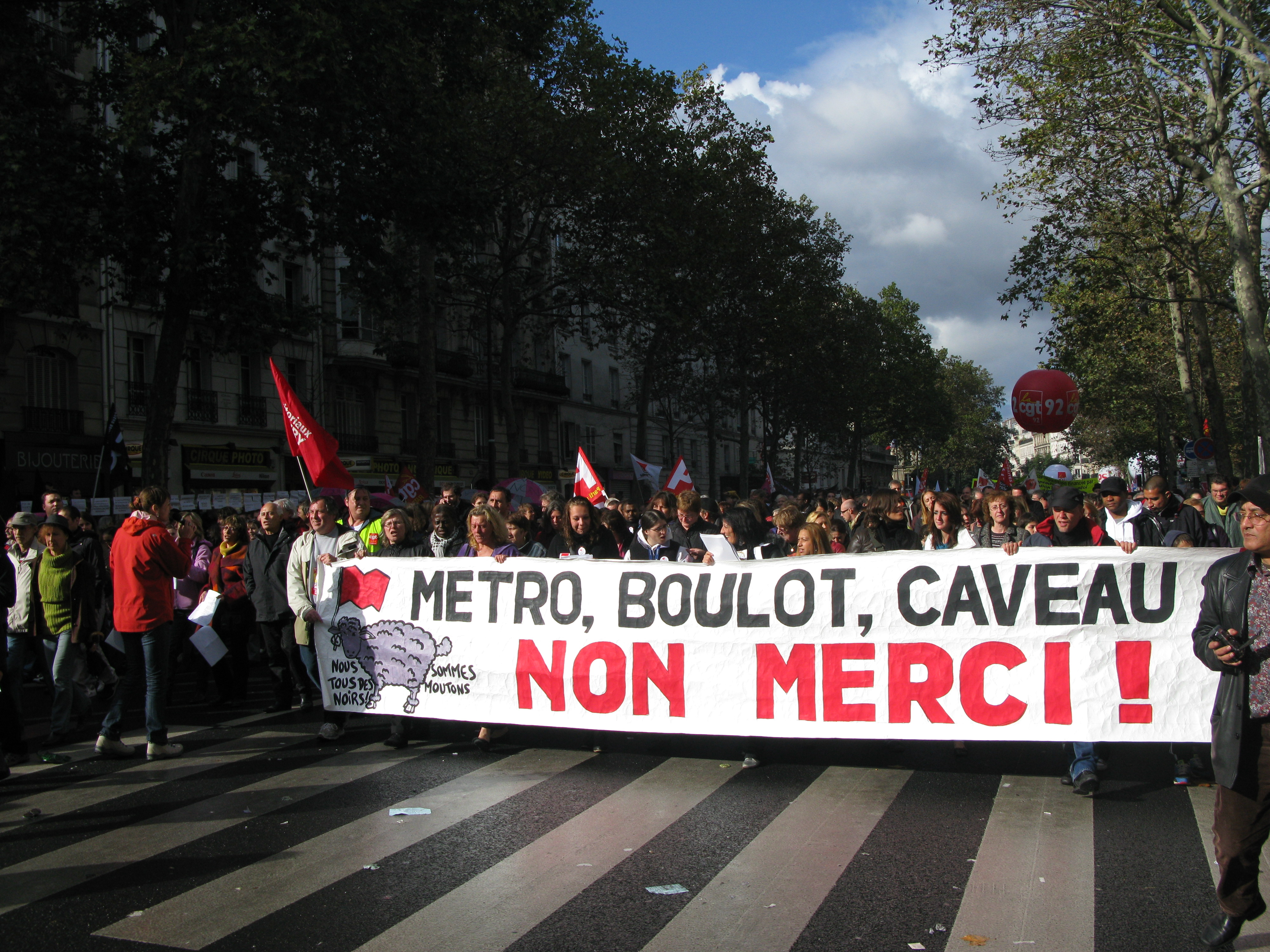
Protest in Paris, 16 October 2010.

Tax reductions

In recent years, and despite the financial crisis, the government has maintained tax cuts for the richest households and companies. A report from the French control department announce that 172 billions €/year are not perceived due to enterprises taxes reductions. French people are confused by the government's reasoning that social spending should be cut because of the lack of money, while pre-crisis special tax cuts are maintained for the richest companies and taxpayers. The 2005 pre-crisis Copé tax cut generated a €22 billion loss in revenue over 3 years, to the benefit of major companies, as opposed to the €1 billion formerly expected. A report by the Conseil des prélèvements obligatoires calculated the real tax rate for major companies, claimed to be about 33%, to actually be approximately 13%, thanks to tax deductions. The cancellation of some of those tax deductions for companies could put €15 to €29 billion a year back into French public finances.

Youth

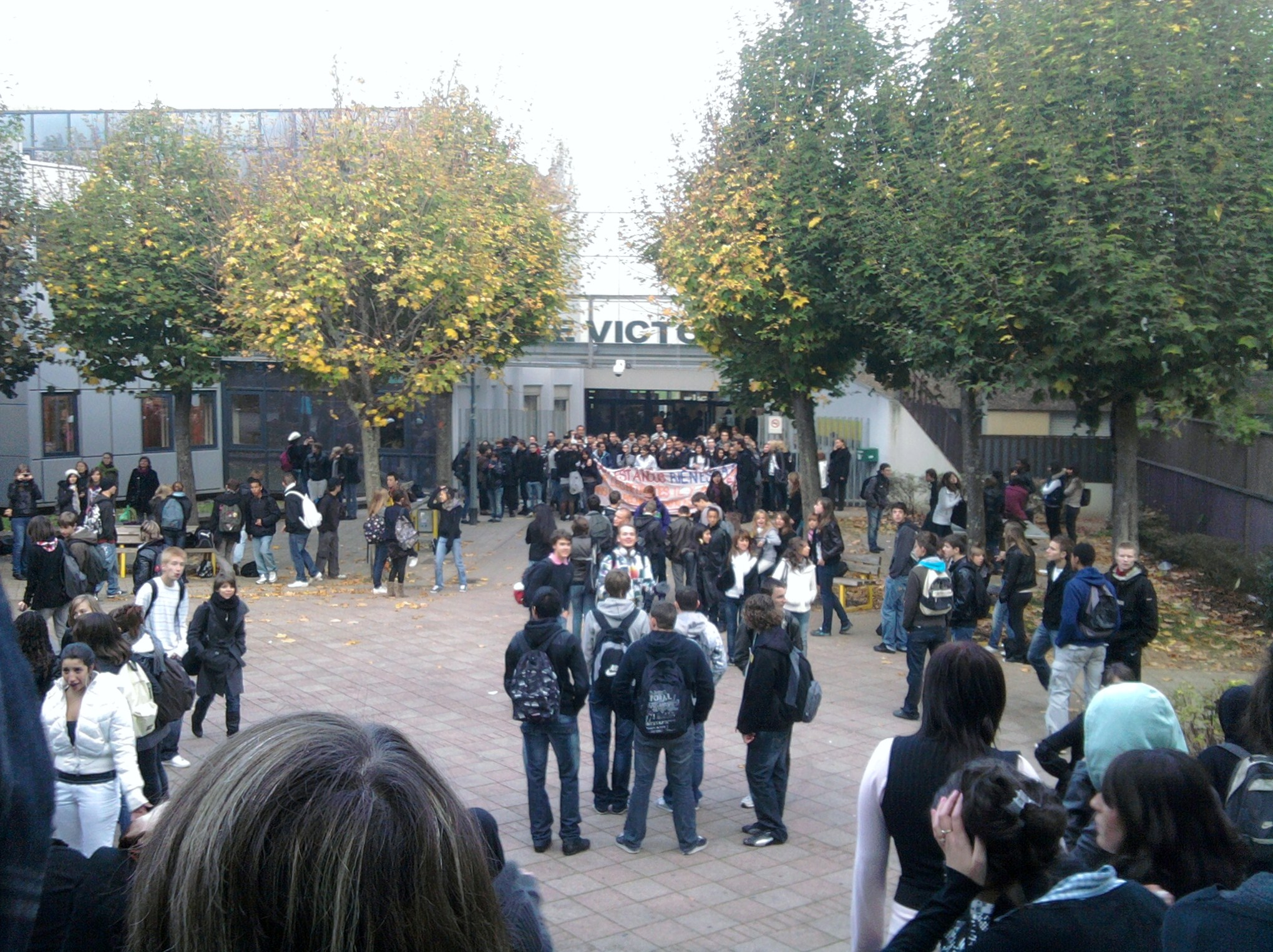
Students blockade Victor Hugo High School in Besançon-Planoise on 14 October 2010

There are concerns the proposals may have a negative effect on the job market, particularly for young workers. The reform may reduce job opportunities by 1 million and has led some students to join the protests.

For the French sociologist Louis Chauvel, due to demographic and economic history, the younger generation is in a specifically difficult situation. The jobless rate for youth (-25 years old) in France has been higher than 20% since 1980, reaching 26% in 2009. Despite the common appeasing promise than the job market would expand when babyboomers retire (2005–2020), the global crisis came, and retirement reforms plan to keep about 1 million more workers on the market. Other problems include repetitive poorly paid internships, job instability and lower incomes, while the qualifications and skills required for vacancies are ever-increasing, requiring several more years of education and financial investment than for previous generations, while postponing savings and contributions to the retirement insurance system. Moreover, rental costs for housing and relatively lower incomes reduce the quality of housing conditions. These tensions are fuelling anti-government feeling and the strike itself.

== Overview of events ==
Date	Participants -lower estimate	Participants -upper estimate
23 March 2010	395 thousand	800 thousand
1 May 2010		300 thousand
27 May 2010	395 thousand	1.0 million
15 June 2010	23 thousand	70 thousand
24 June 2010	700 thousand	1.92 million
7 Sept 2010	1.2 million	2.7 million
23 Sept 2010	1 million	3 million
2 Oct 2010	0.9 million	3 million
12 Oct 2010	1.2 million	3.5 million
16 Oct 2010	0.8 million	3 million
19 Oct 2010	1.1 million	3.5 million
28 Oct 2010	560 thousand	2 million
6 Nov 2010	375 thousand	1.2 million
23 Nov 2010	52 thousand	

French union leaders initially organised fourteen days of nationwide strikes and demonstrations, on Tuesday 7 September, Thursday 23 September, Saturday 2 October, Tuesday 12 October and Saturday 16 October, and Tuesday 19 October. The figures regarding the number of participants vary widely, with numbers being reported by the French Interior Ministry, police, and unions.

The second day of strikes saw the cancellation of as many as 50% of flights at airports in Paris and other cities. Half the country's long-distance trains were cancelled.

A prolonged strike by garbage collectors led to a build-up of trash around the port of Marseille. The strike has lasted for at least three weeks.

All twelve fuel refineries on the French mainland have been affected by the strike. As a result, one in four fuel stations across the country has run dry.

Students began to participate in the demonstrations during October, with 1 in every 15 schools in the country affected by the middle of the month. Police fired rubber bullets in Montreuil, Seine-Saint-Denis, causing a 16-year-old student to nearly lose an eye, with other students reported to have also been injured. Police sprayed tear gas on young protesters in Lyon, which was captured by television cameras. Families and children came to the fore on the third day, the first occasion on which a demonstration occurred on a Saturday.

The fifth day of strikes caused the French government to publicly admit that Paris-Charles de Gaulle Airport was rapidly running out of fuel, though it did advise people "not to panic".

== Reaction by the French government ==
As a result of the strike action there have been minor concessions and amendments made to the pension proposals. President Nicolas Sarkozy said some mothers would be able to receive a full pension even if they had taken years out of work to look after children. However, the government maintains that the core of the proposed reform will not be changed.

== See also ==
- 2006 youth protests in France
- 2019 French pension reform strike
- Crisis situations and protests in Europe since 2000
- May 2010 Greek protests
- Pensions in France
- Protests against Emmanuel Macron
- 2023 French pension reform strikes
