= National Union of Autonomous Trade Unions =

Trade union of France

UNSA
- National Association of the Autonomous Unions
- Founded: 1993
- Headquarters: Paris, France
- Location: France
- Members: 360,000
- Key people: Alain Olive
- Affiliations: CES, TUAC
- Website: http://www.unsa.org

The National Union of Autonomous Trade Unions (French: Union nationale des syndicats autonomes, UNSA) is one of the French confederations of trade unions, but they do not have the présomption irréfragable de représentativité of the General Confederation of Labour (CGT), French Democratic Confederation of Labour (CFDT), Workers' Force (CGT-FO), French Confederation of Christian Workers (CFTC) and French Confederation of Management – General Confederation of Executives (CFE-CGC).

== Profile ==
The UNSA wishes to gather the reformist unions, founded on independence and dialogue with employers. However, the UNSA is not strongly implanted everywhere in France, and received most votes from the white-collar workers and the engineers.

The UNSA challenges the entrenched leadership of the reformist unions: the CFDT, CFTC and CFE-CGC, though the UNSA often co-operates with these unions.

== Professional elections ==
The UNSA won 6.25% of the vote in the employee's college during the 2008 French Labour Court elections, its best result to date. It had won 4.99% in 2002.

== See also ==
- Politics of France
- Trade unions:
  - French Democratic Confederation of Labour
  - French Confederation of Christian Workers
  - Workers' Force
  - General Confederation of Labour
  - Solidaires Unitaires Démocratiques
- Mouvement des Entreprises de France
