= 2024 Martinique social unrest =

Protests against France and inequality

- Date: September 2024 – ongoing
- Location: Martinique
- Caused by: High costs of living and food prices; Social, racial, and economic inequality; Curfews and restrictions on public protests by the Government of France
- Methods: Peaceful demonstration, looting
- Status: Ongoing

Parties
Martinique civilians; Rally for the Protection of Afro-Caribbean Peoples and Resources	Government of France; Companies for Republican Security

Number
Thousands	

Casualties
- Death: 1
- Injuries: 29 (26 police, one civilian)

Since September 2024, there have been widespread protests and violent confrontations across the French Caribbean territory of Martinique. The unrest is caused by elevated costs of living, consequential bans on public protests placed by the central Government of France on several municipalities, and the deployment of elite riot police that had been banned from the territory for over 65 years due to their prior killing of several young demonstrators. The movement has primarily been initiated by the Rally for the Protection of Afro-Caribbean Peoples and Resources (RPPRAC).

The unrest prompted the French state to impose curfews and bans on public gatherings in several municipalities, alongside the deployment of national police forces, including units of the Companies for Republican Security (CRS).

== Background ==
In the years prior to 2024, Martinique has been the site of several widespread protests against inequality in racial and economic areas. Protests and civil unrest were especially prevalent during the COVID-19 pandemic, where several civilians protested against COVID restrictions implemented by the French government in November 2021. These protests were launched in cooperation with neighboring Guadeloupe labor unions against requirements from France made in mid-September 2020 to have a pass certifying COVID-19 vaccination for healthcare workers in order to have access to long-distance travel, restaurants, sports arenas, and other public venues, at penalty of suspension. The protests also expressed anger at widespread racial and economic inequality, and demanded general salary increases, increased teacher hiring, and greater benefits for unemployment. In response to the protests, the French government released a statement saying that, “If the law of the Republic must apply in all French regions, and therefore in Guadeloupe and Martinique, the way it is applied must be adapted to the social conditions and public health situations of these territories.”

The protests resulted in several shots being fired at French security forces, as well as several nearby journalists. Multiple police officers were injured, resulting in ten arrests. French spokesman Gabriel Attal denounced violence at the protests, calling it “unacceptable”. In addition to the violence, several roadblocks were set up by protesters, while cars were set on fire and looting occurred in many municipalities. Police used stun grenades and tear gas to disperse protesters.

== Social unrest ==
Protests began to spread across the Martinique in September 2024 in response to high costs of living and social, racial, and economic inequality. This included statistics released by the Insee indicated that residents of Martinique paid about 30% to 42% more for food relative to mainland French residents, which was viewed by many demonstrators and civil rights leaders as emblematic of lingering historical racial inequality in the majority-black French territory. The Rally for the Protection of Afro-Caribbean Peoples and Resources supported the demonstrations as part of an ongoing campaign to make food affordable and equitable in price for Martinique citizens. Actions in the demonstrations included the blocking of major transport routes, the disruption of port activity, and targeted protests at supermarkets.

Gunfire from protesters culminated in the injuries of at least fourteen people, including eleven police officers and at least one citizen, and also resulted in several burned cars, fire-gutted buildings, and looted stores. Police deployed tear gas against small protests.

As a reaction to the unrest, the French government implemented a ban on protests and large gatherings in Ducos, Fort-de-France, Le Robert, and Le Lamentin, and implemented a curfew in order "to put an end to the violence and damage committed at gatherings, as well as to the numerous obstacles to daily life and freedom of movement that penalize the entire population, particularly at weekends.” The legal restrictions resulted in further resentment from protesters, and resulted in larger and even more widespread protests occurring across the territory on 21 September, with videos showing thousands of protesters waving flags and banging on drums while marching on highways.

In response to the defiance, the French government deployed the Companies for Republican Security to the island, an elite riot police unit that had been banned from the territory for over 65 years due to their violent and disproportionately forceful suppression of demonstrations that killed several young protesters in December 1959. On 10 October, in one of the deadliest days of the riots, at least one person was killed when demonstrators set fire to a police station, cars and road barricades as they clashed with officers. 26 police officers were also injured with bullet wounds.

The movement persisted into 2025, and on the first anniversary of the protests in September 2025, new road blockades and demonstrations were reported with the continuation of demands related to living costs and economic inequality.

== Responses ==
Martinique Socialist Party representative Béatrice Bellay harshly denounced the decision to deploy the Companies for Republican Security to the island, stating that: “Martinique is not in a civil war, it is a social war” that required “open and transparent dialogue” between demonstrators and government. She further clarified that: “This measure ... only serves to aggravate tensions and distract attention from the legitimate demands of the people of Martinique.”

== See also ==
- 2024 New Caledonia unrest
- 2024 French protests against the far-right
- 2021–2022 social unrest in the French West Indies
