= 2021–2022 social unrest in the French West Indies =

Anti-compulsory vacination protests

2021–2022 French West Indies unrest
- Date: 17 November 2021 – 31 March 2022 (4 months and 2 weeks)
- Location: French West Indies
- Goals: End of mandatory vaccination for health care workers; Removal of the French health pass; Better living conditions in overseas territories
- Methods: Riots; General strike; Demonstrations
- Result: The vaccination requirement for healthcare workers was extended to 31 December 2021; The state of health emergency ended

Parties
Protesters: Opponents of the French health pass; Opponents of Emmanuel Macron; Opponents of the Castex government	Government of France: National Police; GIGN

Lead figures
No centralized leadership	Emmanuel Macron; Jean Castex

Casualties
- Deaths: 1
- Injuries: 11 police officers injured: 6 police officers injured by gunshot

The 2021–2022 French West Indies unrest was a social conflict that took place from 17 November 2021, until 31 March 2022, in the French West Indies, particularly in Guadeloupe and Martinique. Unrest has also been reported in other Overseas Territories like Saint Pierre and Miquelon.

Following the French government's decision to introduce compulsory vaccination for health care workers and the health pass in several public places, acts of vandalism, a general strike, and demonstrations began, first in Guadeloupe and then in Martinique.

On 31 March 2022, the state of health emergency ended in the French West Indies.

== History ==
=== 2021 ===
On 19 November, the prefect of Guadeloupe instituted a curfew from 6:00 p.m. to 5:00 a.m. for security reasons.

The authorities announced the closure of schools and prefectural services on 22 November.

The same day, the revolt spread to Martinique.

On 26 November, the Minister for Overseas France, Sébastien Lecornu, announced the postponement of the vaccination requirement until 31 December and said he was ready to "talk about the autonomy of Guadeloupe"

Gunfire, mortar fire, flaming barricades, tear gas: in the streets of the small town of Lamentin to the east of Fort-de-France, en Martinique, the aftermath of the evacuation of the Mahault roundabout looked like a "small urban war" on the night from 1 to 2 December.

In December 2021, candidates for the 2022 French presidential election Marine Le Pen and Jean-Luc Mélenchon visited Mayotte and Guadeloupe.

On 24 December, protesters briefly invaded the Regional Council of Guadeloupe and remained there overnight.

=== 2022 ===
On 3 January, a group of organizations opposed to the health pass and mandatory vaccination organized a "snail operation" by car, which led to traffic jams.

On 4 January, a series of small roadblocks were set up and fires started in the municipality of Sainte-Rose.

The same day, trade unionists from the UTS-UGTG blocked the administrative building of the University Hospital of Pointe-à-Pitre and sequestered the staff for several hours.

On 9 January, the deputy of Saint-Pierre and Miquelon, Stéphane Claireaux, was attacked by protesters. President Emmanuel Macron reacted by denouncing the attack as "intolerable" and "unacceptable".

On 10 January, roadblocks were set up by demonstrators and stones were thrown at the police in Basse-Terre.

On 11 January, protesters demonstrated outside Pointe-à-Pitre university hospital and clashed with police.

On 20 January, rioters injured a police officer with live ammunition on the sidelines of unauthorized demonstrations. The administrative building of the Basse-Terre hospital was invaded by about forty people.

== See also ==
- 2024 social unrest in Martinique
