= Michèle Léridon =

French journalist (1958–2021)

- Born: 10 November 1958; Canteleu, France
- Died: 3 May 2021 (aged 62); Paris, France
- Occupations: journalist, news editor

Michèle Léridon (10 November 1958 – 3 May 2021) was a French journalist and news director. A longtime journalist and editor at Agence France-Presse (AFP), she was its global news director from 2014 to 2019, when she became a member of the French Conseil supérieur de l'audiovisuel.

== Early life and education ==
Michèle Léridon was born in Canteleu, the daughter of a physician and a radiologist, and was educated at the Lycée du Parc Chabrières in Ouillins. She earned degrees in economics from the Lumière University Lyon 2 and in journalism from the Centre de formation des journalistes in Paris.

== Career ==
Léridon began her career in 1977, working as a reporter for two regional newspapers, La Voix de l'Ain and La Nouvelle République du Centre-Ouest, then at the magazine L'Usine Nouvelle.

She joined AFP in 1981, working first in France and covering media news during privatisation, and later in Africa, where she covered wars in Sierra Leone and Liberia and became the first woman director of the agency's Africa coverage. She subsequently worked in other managerial positions including as chief of the Rome bureau, and in 2014 became global news director, also the first woman to hold that post.

In early 2019 she was appointed to the Conseil supérieur de l'audiovisuel, the regulator of electronic media in France, where she headed the working group on rights and liberties, pluralism and professional ethics, and was influential in shaping policy on social media and other online platforms and combatting disinformation. She was also an administrative member of Reporters Without Borders.

== Awards ==
She was awarded the annual prize of the Assises internationales du journalisme et de l'information in the news reporting category in 2014, and the European Alliance of News Agencies prize in 2015.

== Personal life ==
Léridon was divorced; she had three sons.
