= Syndicat national des journalistes =

French professional trade union

National Union of Journalists
- Formation: March 1918
- Type: Trade union
- Purpose: Defend the material and moral interests of professional journalists
- Headquarters: Paris
- Region served: France
- Methods: syndicalisme de lutte
- Key people: Agnès Briançon and Antoine Chuzeville
- Affiliations: Solidaires Union, European Federation of Journalists, International Federation of Journalists
- Funding: Membership fees, donations, and subsidies
- Website: www.snj.fr%20snj.fr
- Remarks: 1st Union at the Press Card Commission

The Syndicat national des journalistes (SNJ, National Union of Journalists), founded in 1918, is a French professional trade union exclusively for professional journalists. It is a founding member of the Solidaires Union (formerly the "Group of Ten") and the International Federation of Journalists (IFJ).

In 2018, this union remained the most representative organization for the journalism profession, securing over 52% of the vote in the 2018 Press Card Commission triennial elections and 38.85% in the union representation measure for the journalism sector.

== History ==
Founded in Paris on 10 during a constitutive meeting at 52 Rue de Châteaudun, the Union of Journalists (not yet named National Union of Journalists) drafted in 27 April the Charter of Journalistic Duties, which established the ethical principles of the profession. This charter was revised in 1938 and updated again in 2011.

In the early 1930s, after failed negotiations for a collective agreement (signed only in 1938), the SNJ, led by its president Georges Bourdon, inspired the Brachard Law of 29 on the status of journalists, establishing the conscience clause, the Journalist Arbitration Commission, and laying the foundation for the Professional Journalist's Identity Card Commission. This commission was formalized by a 1936 decree.

On 9 November 1940, the SNJ, like all existing unions, was dissolved by the Vichy government.

It reconstituted itself in 1946 after a brief attempt to unify the trade union movement. Since 1946, the SNJ has remained the leading journalists' union in France. Its role has been to strengthen and expand the framework established in 1930, including enhancements to the collective agreement as early as 1956, the Cressard Law (1974) affirming the salaried status of freelance journalists, recognition of journalism training centers, affiliation with the UNEDIC unemployment insurance system (1968), and the return of the arbitration commission to the press card commission premises (1993).

In 1981, the SNJ formed the Solidaires Union (formerly "Group of Ten") with nine other organizations.

In the early 2000s, the SNJ shifted its stance on freelance journalists, creating dedicated commissions to assist them. These commissions provide resources for freelancers to learn their rights and participate in employee representative bodies.

In 2018, celebrating its centenary, the SNJ organized events across France, including a tribute to Georges Bourdon in his hometown of Vouziers on 30 June. In Étretat, a Georges-Bourdon garden was inaugurated on 6 October. In Paris, a gathering took place on 10 March 2018 at Place du Trocadéro, 100 years after its foundation. An exhibition titled "100 Years of Fighting for Press Freedom" was displayed at the Paris City Hall from 17 September to 22 October. The 100th SNJ Congress featured Franck Riester, newly appointed Minister of Culture, as a speaker on 18 October. Historian Christian Delporte authored 100 Years of Journalism: A History of the National Union of Journalists (1918–2018).

== See also ==
=== Bibliography ===
- SNJ Publications
  - Le Journaliste, a quarterly SNJ magazine
  - The National Journalists' Collective Agreement, updated in 2012
  - The Journalist's Handbook by François Boissarie and Jean-Paul Garnier (CD edition)
- The Professionalism of Blur, Denis Ruellan, Presses universitaires de Grenoble, 1993
- The National Union of Journalists: Category-Based, (Neo)Corporatist, or Salaried? Camille Dupuy, ENS Cachan, 2012
- Justice at Stake, Stéphane Enguéléguélé, L'Harmattan, 2001
- The ORTF, Power, and Journalists, supplement to Le Journaliste No. 147, 1974
- FR3 Gagged Information, supplement to Le Journaliste No. 195, 1978
- The Right to Information and the Lifting of Secrecy, proceedings from the Press-Police-Justice Committee colloquium, supplement to Le Journaliste No. 195, 1984
- 100 Years of Journalism: A History of the National Union of Journalists (1918–2018), Christian Delporte, Nouveau Monde Editions, 2018

=== Related Articles ===
- Union syndicale des journalistes CFDT
