= Sud-PTT =

French trade union

Sud-PTT is a French trade union created in fall 1988 after the exclusion of more radical elements from the CFDT-PTT. CFDT is a union generally considered as the most open for negotiation and reforms. It is sometimes criticized for this approach, sometimes by its own members. In 1988, when French socialist minister Paul Quiles decided to undertake a deep reform of the Post and Telecommunication Administration, the CFDT decided to support him and to exclude those who would not follow its political line. Other reason for this exclusion: several CFDT unions from the Health and the Post and Telecommunications federations located in the Paris region supported wildcat strikes self-organised by the workers.

The expelled post and telecommunication unions decided to create a new federation, Solidaires, Unitaires et Democratiques (SUD, which also means the south in French).

SUD's success with the workers comes from its rank-and-file sensibility, and its commitment to sharing and renewing the leadership (cf. SUD internal rules). SUD defends Social Movement Unionism by working with several movements: illegal immigrants, the "sans-papiers", unemployed people, etc.

The successes of SUD in La Poste and France Télécom convinced other unions from the left wing of the CFDT to create similar unions in their professional sectors and several new SUD unions were formed following the mass public sector strikes of November and December 1995 and May and June 2003.

SUD-PTT and the other SUD Unions are member of the former Groupe des 10.

- Official site of SUD-PTT
