= Patrick Meney =

French journalist

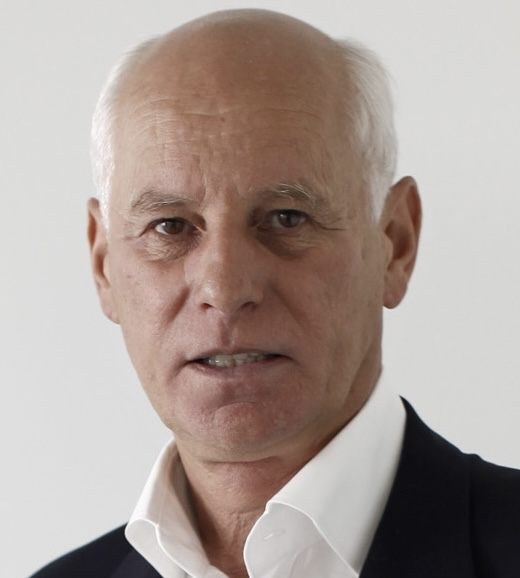
Patrick Meney

Patrick Meney is a French journalist. He was born in Corsaint in 1948. He made his debut as a journalist in 1972, starting at Nice Matin. He joined AFP in 1973, and was their correspondent in Rome (1974–79), special envoy in Iran during the Islamic Revolution (1979–80), correspondent in Moscow (1980–83), special envoy in Lebanon during the Lebanese Civil War, etc. He created AFP-TV, the television service of AFP.

He received the Prix Albert Londres in 1983 for his reporting from the USSR. In 1986, he became director general of Gamma TV. In 1990, he became director general of l’Académie Carat, created by Carat Espace. He was programmer, producer and presenter at TF1, in programs such as "Points Chauds", "En Quête de Vérité", "Les coulisses du Destin", "Témoins n°1", "Célébrités", etc.

He created Be Happy Productions in 2000 and produced programs such as "Défense d’entrer", "Ca me révolte!", "Fallait y penser!", "Supernanny", "Affaires de famille", "Oui Chef!", "On vous dit pourquoi", "Immersion totale", etc. These were broadcast on TF1, France 2, France 3 and M6. He then sold his firm. He returned to journalism, taking up a leadership position at France-Soir (2010–2011).

Patrick Meney has written a dozen books in a variety of fiction and non-fiction genres. Among them are the best-sellers Même les tueurs ont une mère, Les mains coupées de la Taïga, La Kleptocratie, Niet! (Prix des Maisons de la Presse), La Rafale (Prix du livre de l'été), Les voleurs d'innocence, etc.

In 2012, he became producer at TCV Télévision.
