= 1995 strikes in France =

Series of general strikes in France

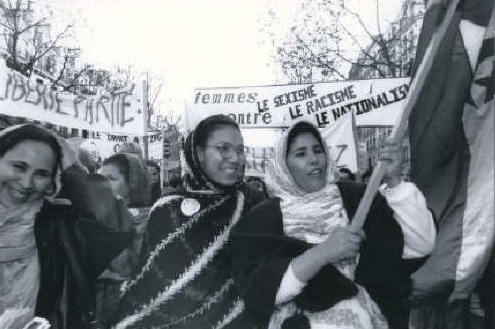
- A protest for women's, abortion and labour rights in Paris, November 1995
- Date: 10 October – 15 December 1995
- Location: France
- Caused by: Welfare cuts, conservative policies of Jacques Chirac
- Methods: Strike action
- Concessions: Cancellation of the Juppé plan

Parties
Public sector workers: General Confederation of Labour	Government of France

Lead figures
Decentralised leadership	Jacques Chirac; Alain Juppé

Number
1,000,000 (12 December)	

In late 1995, a series of general strikes were organized in France, mostly in the public sector. The strikes received great popular support, despite paralyzing the country's transportation infrastructure, and other institutions. The strikes occurred in the context of a larger social movement against the reform agenda led by Prime Minister Alain Juppé, and they constituted the largest social movement in France since May 1968. The strikes were provoked by Juppé, when he announced the pay freezes and delay of tax cuts until 1996. This angered the before split unions that banded together against these policy implementations leading to strikes in mid October which stopped and resumed by 10 November and continued on.

== Events ==
In May 1995, Jacques Chirac, of the right-wing Rally for the Republic party, was elected president with a close vote of 53 to 47. The new prime minister, Alain Juppé, then proposed an extensive program of welfare cutbacks, the Juppé Plan, which intended to reduce the budget deficit from 5% to 3% as required by the 1993 Maastricht Treaty. October and November saw a students' movement against the conservative agenda of the new government and its perceived attack on women's rights, notably the right to abortion and contraception. On 10 October, around 57% of civil servants (roughly 50,000 people) gathered in a national strike against the policy changes proposed. Despite the concentrated demonstration of dislike for the policies, Juppé refused to change the policy and the unions warned him of additional strikes. The strikes resumed 10 November when the transportation workers around France banded to protest the policy causing disruption in train and airway systems and touching as many as 80 cities in France. Despite the strikes Juppé announced the firmness of his position on the policy on 15 November which further angered union workers around France.

After the announcement on 15 November the unions grew angrier and organized additional strikes. First there was a strike by the General Confederation of Labour (CGT) on 24 November as a show of discontent to Juppé's sternness on the policy. This strike fewer civil servants attended, however it was heavily influenced by the transportation workers in France who shut down most of buses, trains and subway systems making the effects of the strike more palpable than the ones before. Witnessing the massive emergence of the strikes the government opened the avenue of discussion for resolution, however the discussion was not fruitful and Parisians returned to square zero. Afterwards, on 28 November, approximately 60,000 Parisians banded for another strike fueling the protests than have been taking place. The infrastructure of Paris was paralyzed once more and the strikers claimed that they would continue indefinitely. Juppé tried to mitigate damage by hiring private buses and cars but the effort was stopped in its tracks by Parisians.

Further along in December, the railway workers were called out on strike against the Juppé Plan by their unions nationwide, and this paralyzed France's railway system in addition to the city infrastructure. The main grievances for the railway workers were the loss of the right to retire at age 55 and an SNCF restructuring plan that was to eliminate thousands of jobs, and which was imposed on the workers by SNCF management without negotiation. The railway workers were joined by Paris's metro personnel, postal workers, school teachers, and other public workers on 12 December snowballing the strikes out of control. The last strike on 12 December counted up to one million Parisian gathering causing an existential threat to French government leading to forced discussion. The strike was called off on 15 December, when Juppé dropped the retirement reform plan and most workers returned to work by 16 December.

== Figures ==
The DARES statistical institute of the Ministry of Employment counted 6 million strike days (summing up each individual's decision to go on strike, per day) in 1995, against 1 million the previous year. Among these 6 million strike-days, 4 million were in the public sector (including France Télécom) and 2 million in the private and semi-public sector (including SNCF, RATP, Air France and Air Inter). In this last sector, the average number of strike-days from 1982 to 1994 had been of 1.1 million a year (while it was 3.3 million from 1971 to 1981).

Starting in November, the SNCF and the RATP were paralyzed for two months. Despite the inconveniences, public support remained firmly with the strikers. People started hitch-hiking and sharing cars to go to work, using bikes, etc.

== See also ==
- 2006 labour protests in France
- November 2007 strikes in France
- 2010 strikes in France
