= Union syndicale des journalistes CFDT =

Trade union of France

Union syndicale des journalistes CFDT is one of the three journalist's labor unions in France, created in 1992 and involved in professional deals in about one hundred newspapers, TV and radio. Its website was created in 2005.

The Union syndicale des journalistes CFDT, enrolled about on thousand journalists all over the country and defend author's right and freelance working conditions. It is involved in several deals with other unions, like the petition for freedom of press.
