= Protests against Emmanuel Macron =

Series of protests

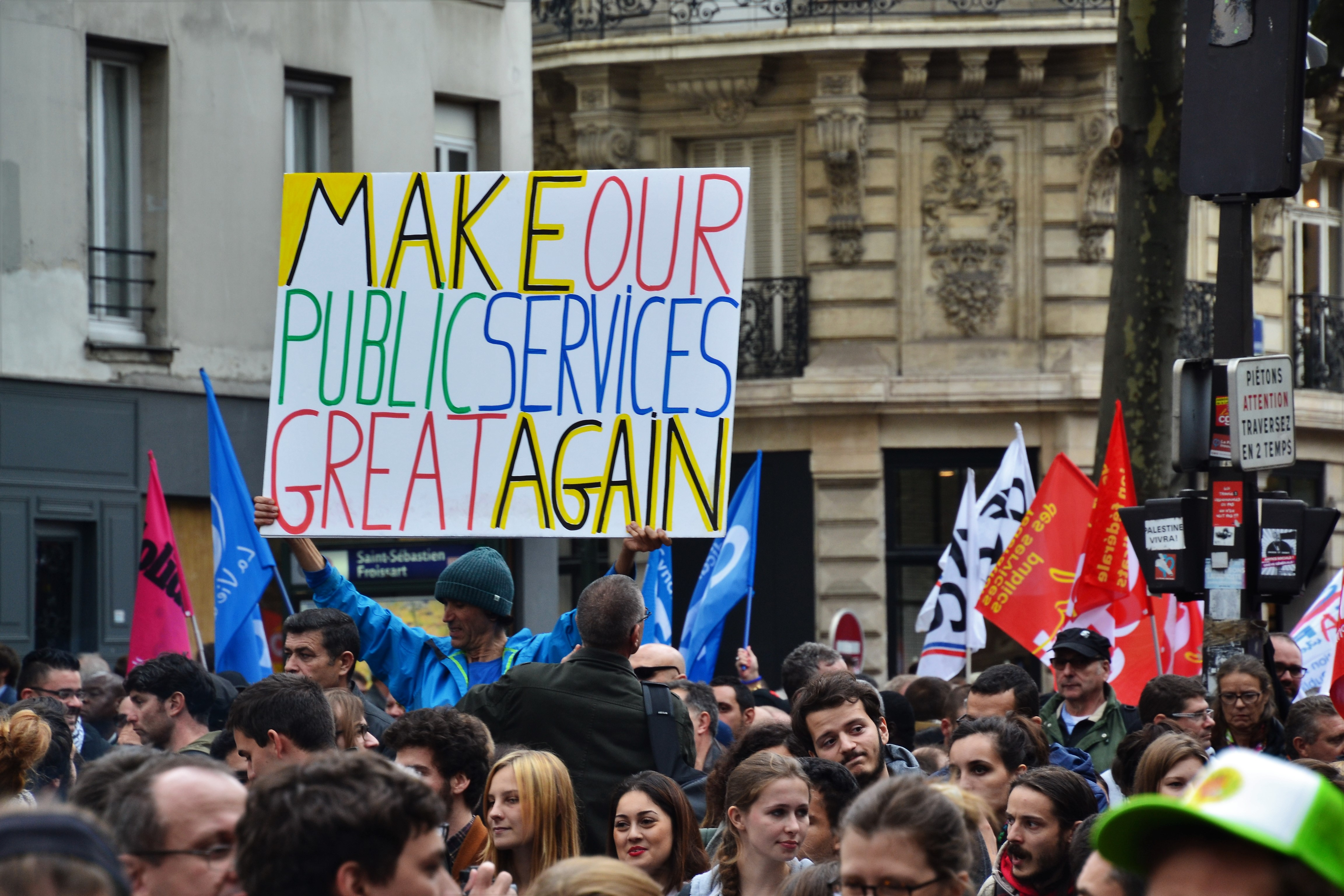
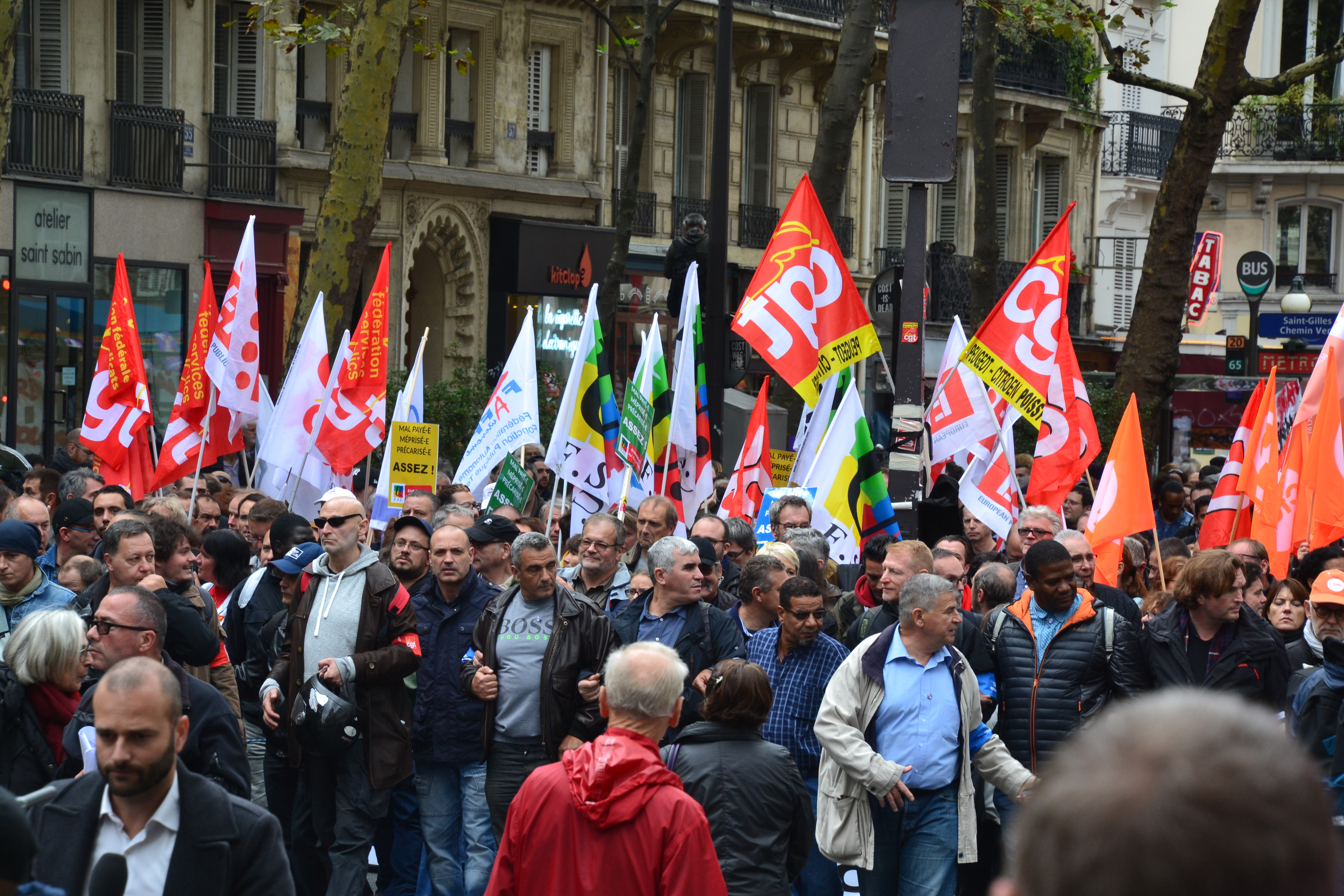
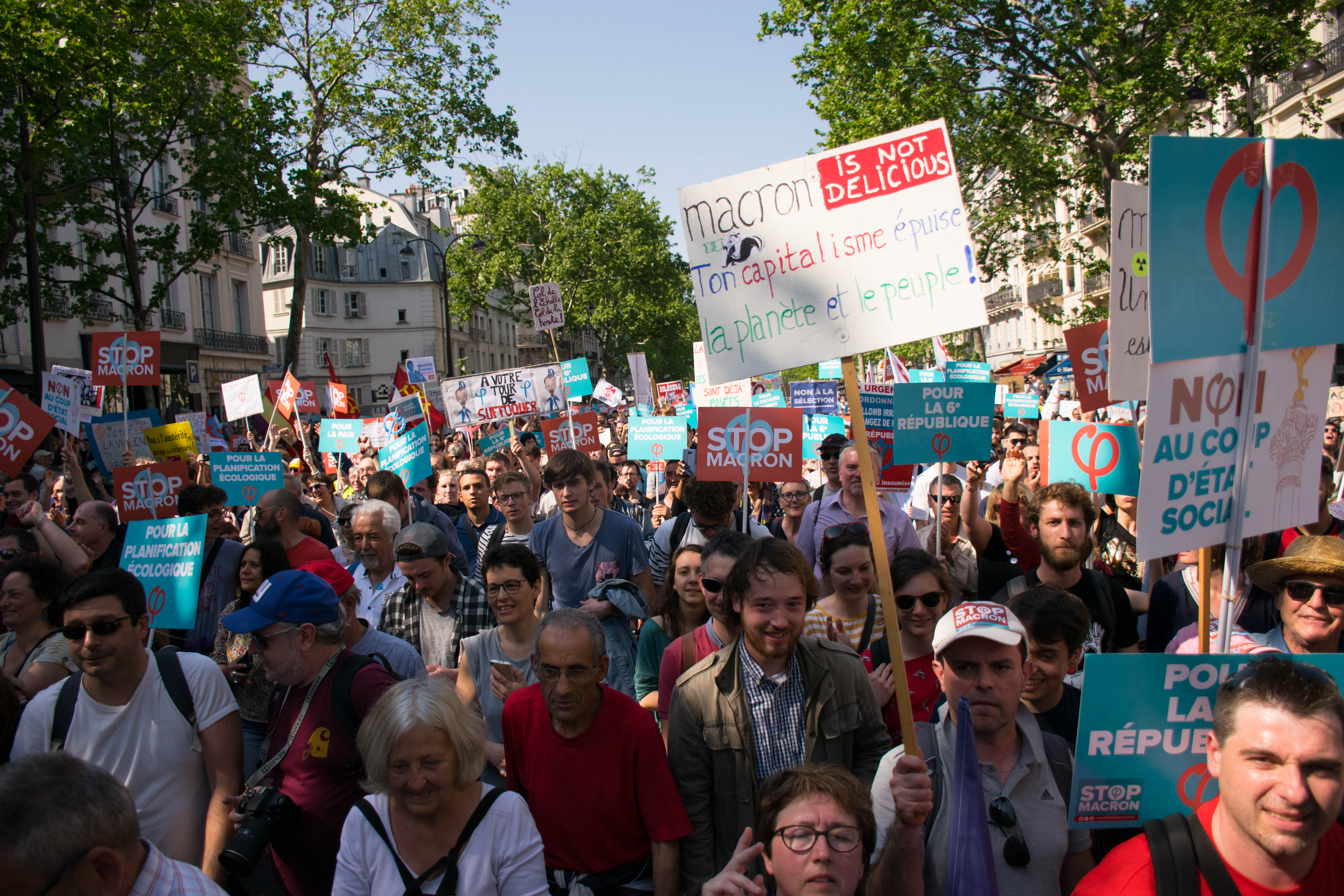
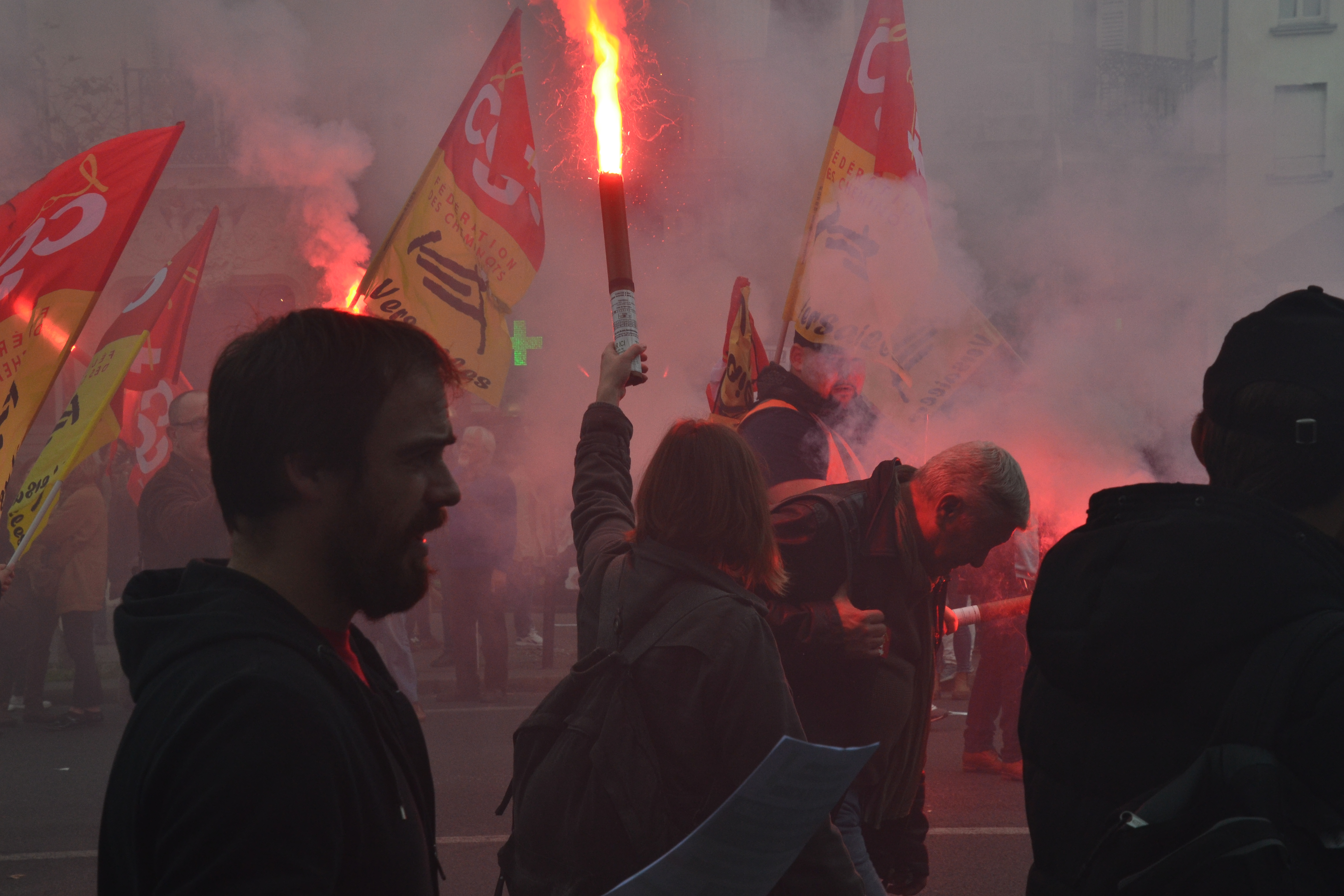
- Date: 7 May 2017 – present (9 years, 6 months, 2 weeks and 1 day)
- Location: France
- Caused by: Globalisation; Neoliberalism; French labour law reform; 2023 French pension reform law; High fuel taxes; Emmanuel Macron's economic positions; Police brutality
- Methods: Demonstrations, riots, vandalism, arson, assault
- Status: Ongoing

Since Emmanuel Macron was elected President of France on 7 May 2017, a series of protests have been conducted by trade union activists, left-wing activists and right-wing activists in opposition to what protesters consider to be neoliberal policies and globalism, his support of state visits by certain world leaders, his positions on French labour law reform, as well as various comments or policy proposals he has made since assuming the presidency.

According to Amnesty International, French authorities have used the state of emergency, which was in effect from the November 2015 Paris attacks until November 2017, to suppress protests, employing their emergency powers. They "imposed 639 measures preventing specific individuals participating in public assemblies. Of these, 574 were targeted at those protesting against proposed labour law reforms".

== Post-election ==
On 8 May 2017, only a few hours after Macron was announced the winner of the 2017 French presidential election, union protesters began clashing with authorities in Paris under fears that Macron's economic program would take away workers' rights. The protest was organised by "Social Front", which had already staged protests before the second round to protest the two frontrunners, Marine Le Pen and Emmanuel Macron. One specific protest organized by the Social Front had 950 to 1,500 protesters with individuals trying to occupy publicly owned buildings like a railway station in Rennes. Nearly 150 protesters were arrested.

The 8 May protest was supported by the CGT and SUD unions.

== Protests ==
=== 2017 ===
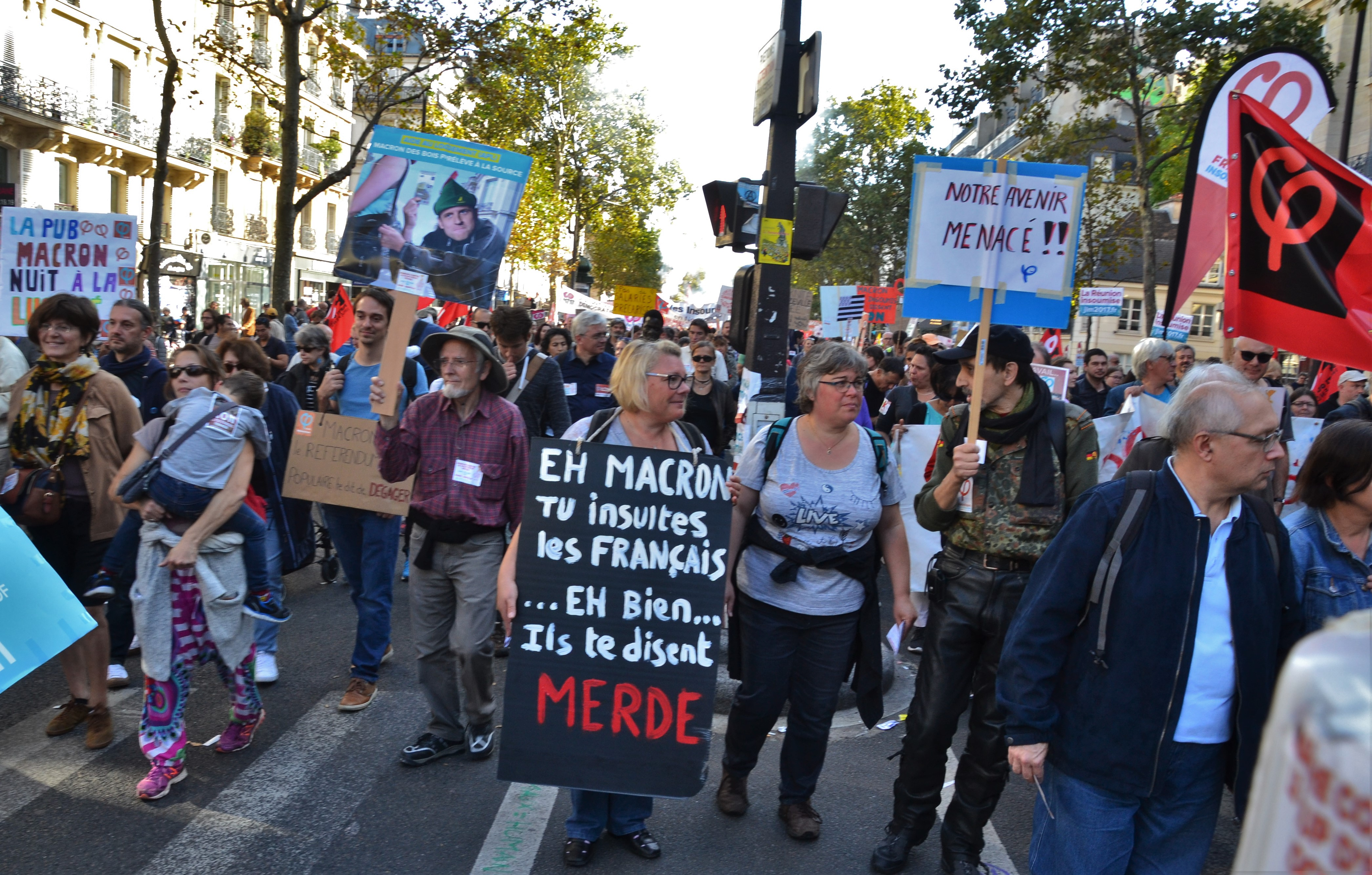
Protest against Macron in Paris on 23 September 2017

After Macron was inaugurated on 15 May 2017, there were numerous warnings from Labour unions about the prospect of a large organized protest. The CGT Union has attempted numerous times to organise a large-scale demonstration against Macron with one taking place on 12 September 2017. Macron has actively tried to prevent this by opening Labor code reform negotiations with trade unions. The reception among the unions has been mixed with the head of the FO union supporting the negotiations, the French Democratic Confederation of Labour deciding to stay neutral, not participating in the 12 September protests and the CGT denouncing the negotiations alongside its ally Solidaires Unitaires Démocratiques. Jean-Luc Mélenchon from La France Insoumise spoke in support of the 12 September protest encouraging members to attend. Mélenchon organized a protest on 12 July 2017. In response to the protests, Macron told the protesters that he would "not yield anything, either to the lazy, the cynics or the extremes." The turnout to the September 12 anti-Macron protests was lower than the turnout to the pro-labour demonstrations against President Hollande the year prior.

US President Donald Trump's state visit to France during Bastille Day was met with protests, protesters gathered around Place de la République to create a "No Trump Zone". Protesters opposed the Trump visit and Macron's policies; with the ranks of the protesters being made up of socialists, pro-Palestinian groups, migrants' rights activists, environmentalists and anti-fascists. Despite mass protests, 59% of French people approve of Trump's visit.

Following Prime Minister Édouard Philippe's announcement of the plans for immigration reform, a small protest was led by a group of LGBT activists in Paris holding up a sign reading "Macron starves migrants, queers without borders"

A series of protests by wine producers in the South of France have been ongoing since François Hollande's presidency. These demonstrations generally involve arson, sabotage and assault. These protests are caused by the importation of wine rather than buying it from French producers and the loss of culture. These protests have led to a 25% decrease in sales for Spanish wine producers. Spanish tankers transporting wine are usually the target of these attacks.

Pro-Palestinian protesters began to demonstrate against Macron offering Israel Prime Minister Netanyahu a place at the Paris Holocaust Ceremony. The French Communist Party also opposed Netanyahu's visit. The organizers of the protest were unknown but Le Muslim Post, a religious radioshow promoted the demonstration, encouraging listeners to attend.

=== 23 March 2018 ===
200,000 rallied against Macron's reform plans nationwide.

=== 19 April 2018 ===
Tens of thousands of striking rail workers, public sector staff and students rallied across France against Macron. The SNCF and CGT were the major unions in the protests against plans by Macron to remove job-for-life guarantees and pension privileges for new recruits.

=== 13 May 2018 ===
Transport workers continued to protest against rampant privatisation efforts. Key SNCF services were reduced on Sunday.

=== 26 May 2018 ===
A day after Macron "suggested he could be close to victory in a public battle over his reform agenda," several thousands people across France, led by CGT trade union and some 80 other organizations protested against Macron's reforms of the public sector, described by the organizers as imbalanced and "brutal." According to CGT 80,000 people participated in the protest in Paris, and 250,000 came out across the country. However, France Police said that 21,000 people participated in the Paris protests and that 35 protesters were detained for various "offences". Police fired tear gas and deployed 2000 officers to the event and the demonstrators were holding placards reading "Stop Macron!".

=== Yellow Vests protests ===
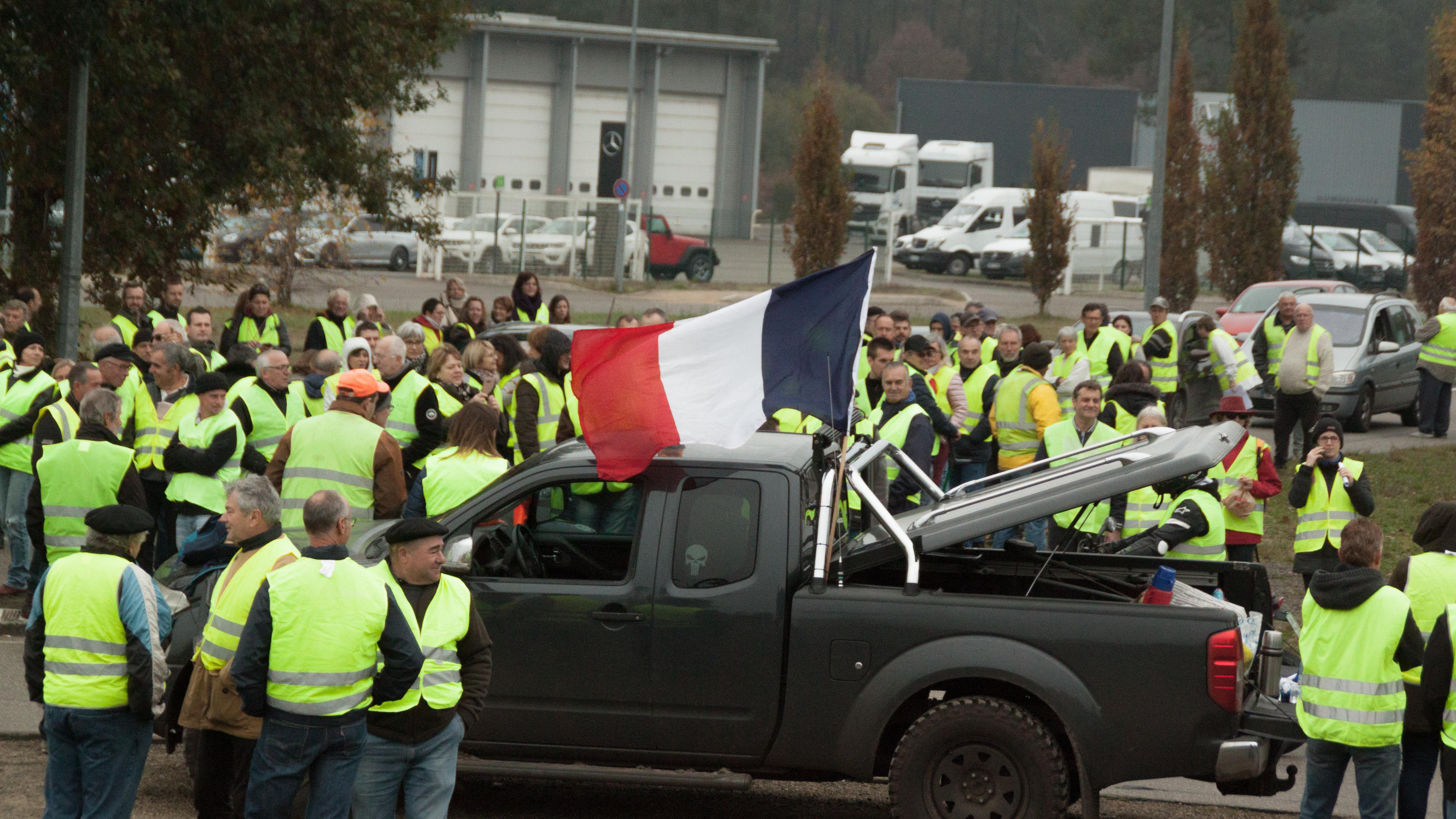
A gilets jaunes protest in Mont-de-Marsan on 17 November 2018

In October 2018, Macron announced that the carbon tax would rise in 2019. This was seen as a move crippling the rural class who had no other choice than to use the car and could not afford more expensive fuel. On 17 November 2018, protests began in most major cities, and highways were blocked. Protests occurred on every Saturday as of June 2019. The Yellow vests movement is noticed for having no official leader and its independence, in spite of appropriation attempts by the France Insoumise (Unsubmitted France) and the Rassemblement National (National Rally) parties.

=== 5 December 2019 ===
A general strike to protest changes to France's pension system proposed by Macron. More than 800,000 people protested across the country.

=== Protests 2020–2021 ===
Thousands of protesters marched peacefully in a small group against the legislative bill that will criminalise the publish & circulation of the photograph of police office, which the opponent says would limit the press freedom. The protest is also organised to show the anger over the footage where a music producer Michel Zecler a black man, being beaten by three police officers in Paris on 21 November 2020. Some small group of masked protesters dressed in black, burnt down two cars, a motorcycle and a cafe and smashed the windows of the local shops. In response police fired tear gases and stun grenades to disperse the crowd. They also used fired water cannon. The interior ministry said that 46,000 protesters participated in the protest in Paris and nine were arrested.

=== COVID-19 protests ===
Numerous protests took place in 2021 following the introduction of health passes to enter certain public venues during the COVID-19 pandemic. The measures were introduced by Macron's government to increase uptake of COVID-19 vaccination in France.

=== 2022 French presidential election protests ===
On 16 April, after Macron's victory in the first round of presidential voting, left wing demonstrators clashed with police. French security forces fired tear gas as the anti right-wing demonstrators marched, before allowing the protests to resume. On 24 April, after Macron's victory in the second round of presidential voting, protests broke out in many departments. In the area of Châtelet, riot police charged and sprayed tear gas on demonstrators. Students protested outside of the Sorbonne, expressing their disillusionment of the lack of choice in second round voting.

=== Autumn 2022 protests ===
On 16 October 2022 tens of thousands marched in Paris in protests of rising cost of living at an inflation rate of more than 6%. Concomitantly there have been labor strikes at oil refineries and nuclear plants causing gas shortages.

=== 2023 ===
A day of strikes and demonstrations took place throughout France against the Macron's pension reform project, which proposes to raise the retirement age to 64. Some are calling this the “Second French Revolution” as public services began strikes and workers quit their jobs.

=== 2024 ===
Following the National Rally (RN) party's victory in 2024 European parliament elections and the resulting dissolution of parliament and snap elections called by Macron, several unions and left-leaning party organizations called for demonstrations across France, as well as for creating coalitions between left-leaning and far left political parties to prevent National Rally or Macron's party from achieving victory in French parliament. While the protests primarily centered around resisting RN policies, most also voiced their disapproval with Macron's policies and attempts to temper civil disobedience with slogans such as "Macron-Bardella, same fight”, and “We are here even if Macron does not want it”. The CGT, who helped rally protests, released a press statement citing reasons for the protest that included opposition to the "policies of Emmanuel Macron".

=== 2026 ===
Since September 2026, weeks of protests took place, directed against the austerity policies of the Macron government and Édouard Geffray as Minister of National Education, decrying a decline in education conditions, calling for better school funding and an end to educational inequality. The protesting pupils were supported by the Union Syndicale Lycéenne (USL), the French intelligence services attributed the "origin of the movement" to La France Insoumise. The school pupils received support from the "Union Étudiante" joining the protest, calling, among other things, for "massive funding" for high schools and universities. Widespread opposition emerged against the explosion in military spending, the escalation of wars, the police state, and the rise of neofascism. Student protests gather up to 800,000 people in France in mid October 2026.

== See also ==
- El Khomri law
