= Fédération Syndicale Unitaire =

Trade union of France

Fédération syndicale unitaire
- Founded: 1993
- Headquarters: 104 rue Romain Rolland 93260 Les Lilas
- Location: France
- Members: 165,000
- Key people: Benoît Teste (General Secretary)
- Website: www.fsu.fr

The Fédération syndicale unitaire is the main trade union in the education sector in France and the largest trade union in the public sector. It has 162,000 members, of whom 88% are teachers.

It is organised on the same lines as its predecessor, the Fédération de l'éducation nationale.

== Affiliates ==
The following unions are affiliated:

- National Union of School and University Administration and Libraries (SNASUB)
- National Union of Scientists (SNCS)
- National Union of Physical Education and Sports (SNEP)
- National Union of Secondary level teaching (SNES)
- National Union of Higher Education (SNESup)
- National Union of Public Agricultural Technical Education (SNETAP)
- National Union of Nurses and Health Advisors (SNICS)
- National Union of Inspection Staffs (SNPI)
- National Unitary Union for Vocational Education (SNUEP)
- Single National Union of primary level Teachers, school teachers and GCEP (SNUipp)
- National Unitary Union of National Education Management Personnel (SNUPDEN)
- Unitary Syndicate of Popular Education, Social, Sociocultural and Sports Action (EPA)
- National Union of Cultural Affairs (SNAC)
- National Union of All Prison Administration Staff (SNEPAP)
- National Union of Education and Social Workers - judicial protection of young people (SNPES-PJJ)
- National Environmental Union (NIS)
- National Interdepartmental Union of Territories, Agriculture and the Sea (SNUITAM)
- Unified Staff Union of the Ministry of Foreign Affairs (SUPMAE)
- National Unitary Union of Social Workers of the Public Service (SNUAS-FP)
- National Unitary Syndicate of the staff of the Caisse des Dépôts et Consignations group (SNUP-CDC)
- National Unitary Union - Work employment training integration (SNUTEFI)
- National Unitary Union of the Land (SNUTER)

== General Secretaries ==
1993: Michel Deschamps
1999: Monique Vuaillat and Daniel Le Bret
2000: Monique Vuaillat and Pierre Duharcourt
2001: Gérard Aschieri
2010: Bernadette Groison
2019: Benoît Teste
