= French Confederation of Management – General Confederation of Executives =

Trade union of France

CFE-CGC
- French Confederation of Management - General Confederation of Executives
- Confédération Française de l'Encadrement CGC
- Founded: October 15, 1944
- Headquarters: Paris, France
- Location: France
- Members: 140,000
- Key people: François Hommeril, president Gérard Mardiné, secretary general
- Affiliations: TUAC
- Website: www.cfecgc.org

The French Confederation of Management – General Confederation of Executives (French: Confédération française de l'encadrement - Confédération générale des cadres, CFE-CGC) is one of the five major French confederations of trade unions. It only organizes unions for professional employees, with higher education and/or in management or executive positions. It originated from several former unions of engineers in 1945. Its leader is François Hommeril.

== Professional Elections ==
The CFE-CGC won 8.19% of the vote in the employee's college during the 2008 professional elections, its best result to date. It had won 7.01% in 2002.

== Affiliates ==
The following federations and unions are affiliated:

- Federation of the food industry (CFE-CGC Agro)
- Federation of Water and Sanitation (FDEA CFE-CGC)
- Insurance Federation
- Federation of Chemistry
- Construction federation
- Federation of Culture, Communication and Entertainment (FCCS CFE-CGC)
- Federation of Sales Forces (CSN CFE-CGC)
- Federation of air trades (FNEMA CFE-CGC)
- Federation of finance and banking professions (SNB Services)
- Federation of Public Services (CFE-CGC FP)
- Transport Federation
- Federation of Commerce and Services (FNECS CFE-CGC
- Federation of Mines Supervision (FNEM CFE-CGC)
- Energy Federation CFE-CGC
- Federation enermine
- Media Federation 2000 (CFE-CGC Media)
- Metallurgy Federation
- National Federation CFE-CGC of ports and chambers of commerce and industry (SNECA)
- National Federation of Hotel, Catering and Sports (CFE-CGC INOVA)
- National Federation of Management Staff of IT Service Companies (FIECI)
- National union CFE-CGC of executives in the service of employment (CFE-CGC Apec)
- Union social protection health CFE-CGC (UP2S health)
- Union social protection health CFE-CGC (UP2S social security)
- Union for social health protection of Provident and Supplementary Retirement Institutions and Schemes (UP2S IPRC)
- Territorial union CFE-CGC of New Caledonia
- Local union (UL)
- The departmental union (UD)
- The regional union (UR)
- The Confederation

== Presidents ==
1944: Jean Ducros
1956: André Malterre
1975: Yvan Charpentié
1979: Jean Menu
1984: Paul Marchelli
1993: Marc Vilbenoît
1999: Jean-Luc Cazettes
2005: Bernard Van Craeynest
2013: Carole Couvert
2016: François Hommeril
2026: Christelle Thieffinne
