= Union syndicale Solidaires =

Trade union of France

- Union syndicale Solidaires logo

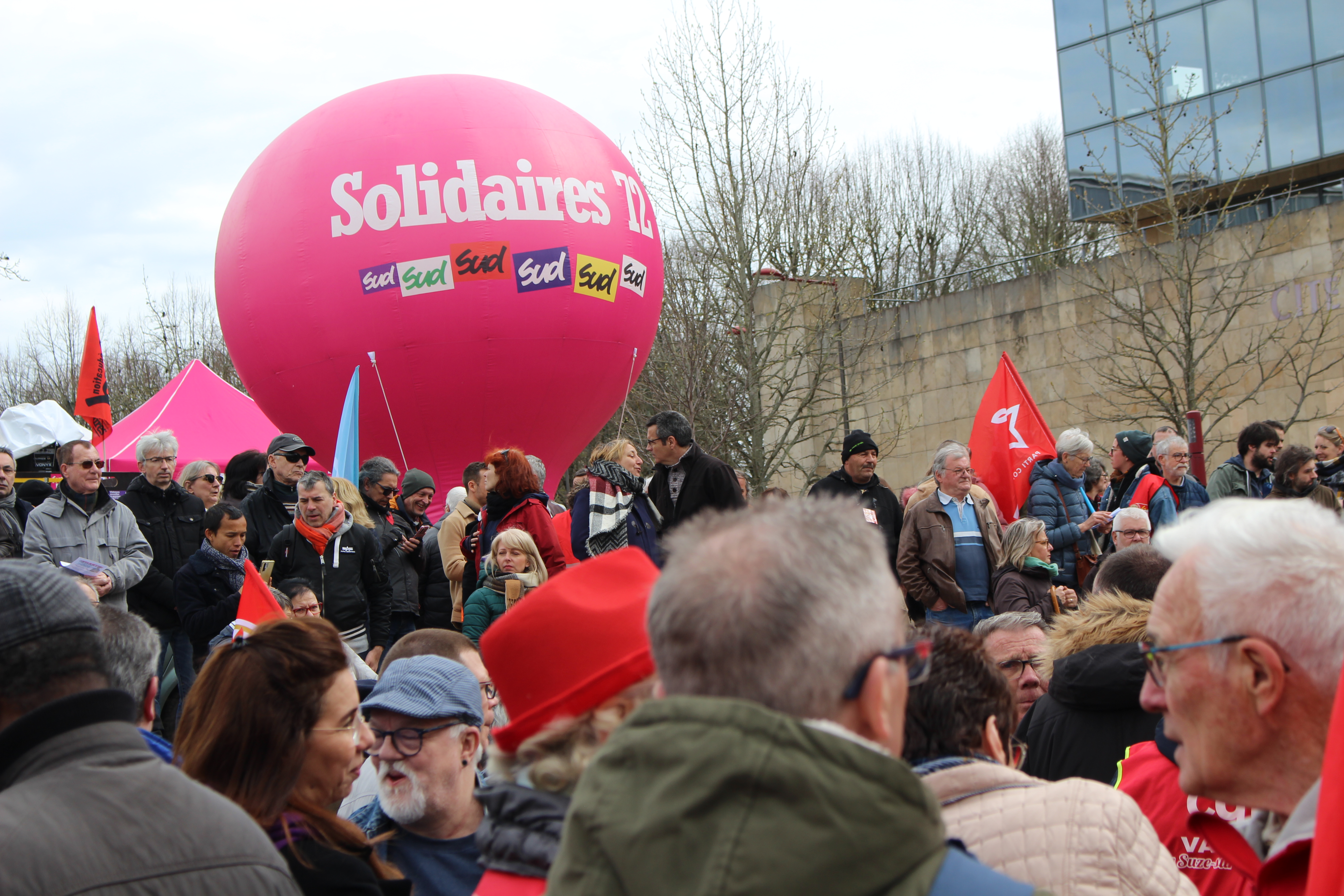
- Demonstration against 2023 French pension reform law in Le Mans, March 28, 2023
- Formation: December 10, 1981
- Headquarters: 31, Rue de la Grange-aux-Belles
- Location: Paris, France
- Affiliations: International Labour Network of Solidarity and Struggles
- Website: https://solidaires.org

The Union syndicale Solidaires, Solidaires or Solidaires Unitaires Démocratiques (SUD) is a French group of trade unions.

== Political position ==
They tend to favor progressive or even radical views and work with the alter-globalization or anti-globalization movement.

The Group of 10 and the SUD Unions are part of the European Social Forum and the World Social Forum.

Most of the SUD trade-union practice a syndicalism of struggle (syndicalisme de lutte), like factions of the CGT, FO and the CNT. That places it in opposition to the reformist or negotiation unions: the CFDT, Confédération Française des Travailleurs Chrétiens (CFTC), CFE-CGC and Union nationale des syndicats autonomes (UNSA).

Many members of SUD are also members of the New Anticapitalist Party, but there are also communist, socialist, ecologist, and anarchist sympathizers within the union.

== History ==
The Group of 10 was created in 1981 by autonomous unions, such as the SNUI, or the SNJ, organizing journalists.

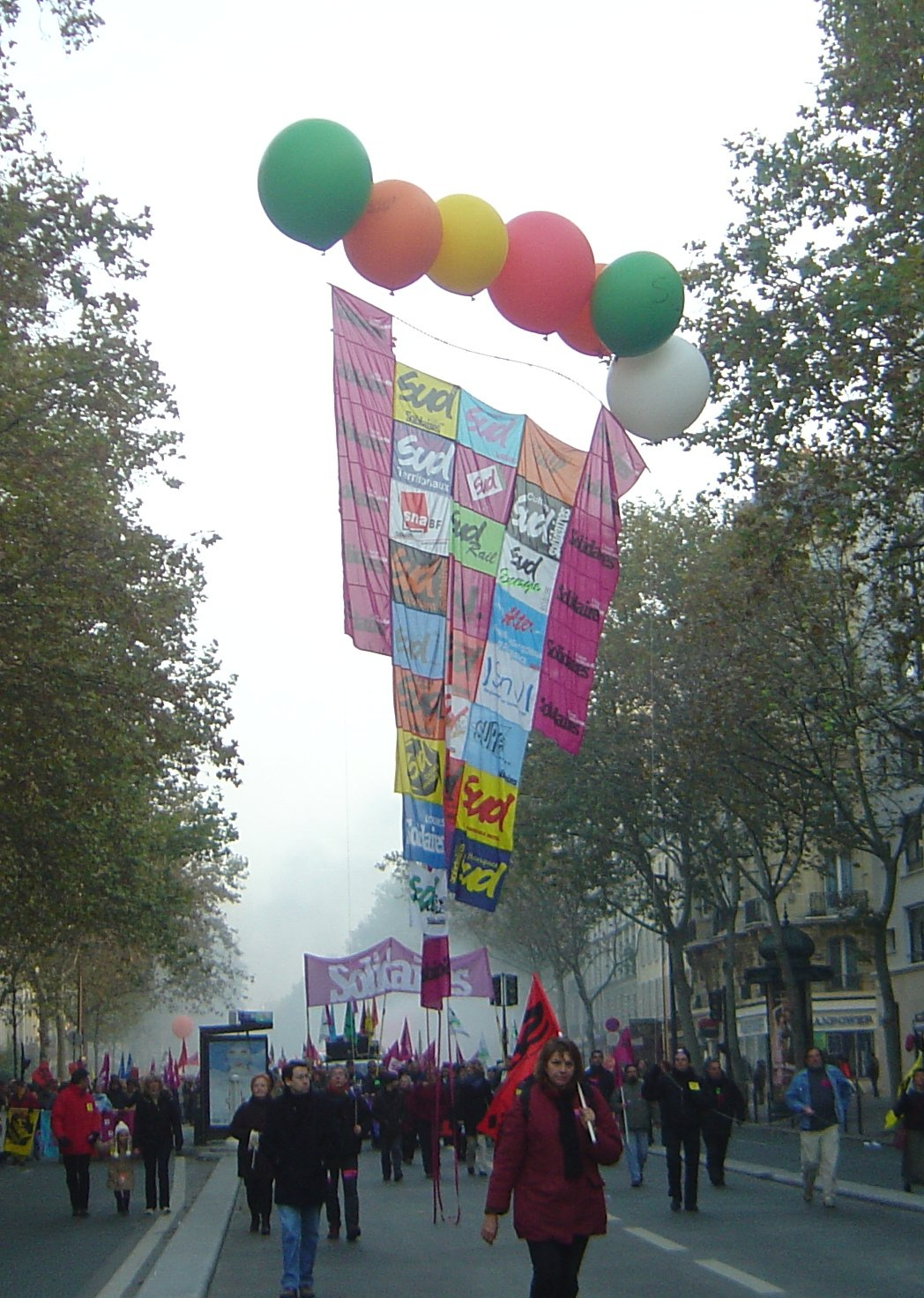
SUD banner in a 2005 demonstration in Paris

Most of these were unions who had refused to choose a side in the 1946 split between the reformist Workers' Force and the communist CGT.

But several of those unions decided to join UNSA - an alliance of moderate Unions - in 1993, soon after Sud-PTT joined the Group of 10.

The first SUD union was created in 1988 after a split within the CFDT.

The CFDT expelled several unions from the health and the post and telecommunications federations located in the Paris region because they supported wildcat strikes self-organized by the workers. The expelled post and telecommunication unions decided to create a new federation, Sud-PTT, which got encouraging electoral results a few months later.

SUD defends social movement unionism by working with several movements: illegal immigrants, unemployed people and so forth.

The successes of SUD in La Poste and France Télécom convinced other unions from the left wing of the CFDT to create similar unions in their professional sectors and several new SUD unions were formed following the mass public sector strikes of November and December 1995 and May and June 2003.

SUD unions are now important in the health care sector, education, transportation (including the SNCF and Air France), cultural institutions such as the Louvre, as well as in some companies such as Michelin, Thales, or even students with Solidaires étudiant-e-s, syndicat de luttes.

== Professional Elections ==
Solidaires won 3.82% of the vote in the employee's college during the 2008 professional elections, its best result to date. It had won 1.51% in 2002.

== See also ==
- Politics of France
  - Trade unions:
    - Workers' Force
    - French Confederation of Christian Workers
    - French Democratic Confederation of Labour
    - General Confederation of Labour
    - French Confederation of Management - General Confederation of Executives
- Mouvement des Entreprises de France
