= Financial services in the United Kingdom =

Sector of the economy of the United Kingdom

The financial services industry in the United Kingdom comprises banks, building societies, insurers, asset managers and other firms that provide payment, savings, credit, investment and risk management products and support to households, businesses and governments.

In 2023, financial and insurance services contributed about £208.2 billion to the UK economy, around 8.8% of total economic output, making the sector one of the country's largest measured by gross value added. When related professional services are included, the wider industry contributed an estimated £275 billion in gross value added in 2022 and employed almost 2.5 million people, about one in every thirteen UK workers, with roughly two thirds of these jobs based outside London. UK-based financial and related professional services generate a substantial trade surplus. In 2022, UK financial services recorded a surplus of about £92 billion, the largest financial services trade surplus of any country.

The sector operates within a regulatory framework in which HM Treasury sets overall policy while the Bank of England, the Prudential Regulation Authority and the Financial Conduct Authority share responsibility for prudential supervision and conduct regulation.

== History ==
=== Background and Big Bang reforms ===
The modern United Kingdom financial services industry grew out of a long established banking, insurance and capital markets sector, with London developing as an important international financial centre during the twentieth century. Regulatory arrangements were initially split across several specialist bodies and pieces of legislation before being consolidated in the late twentieth century.

In the 1980s the government pursued a programme of financial liberalisation. A key milestone was the set of changes to the rules of the London Stock Exchange in October 1986, known as the Big Bang, which ended fixed minimum commissions, removed the separation between brokers and jobbers, allowed external ownership of member firms and moved trading towards electronic systems. These reforms contributed to higher trading volumes and helped London to compete more effectively with New York and other international financial centres.

=== Expansion and the global financial crisis ===
By the mid 2000s, financial and insurance services had become a major contributor to United Kingdom national income. Official estimates for 2004 suggest that the sector accounted for around 8 percent of gross value added, a larger share than in the early 1980s, and industry analysis highlighted its growing role in employment and tax receipts. The period saw rapid growth in wholesale markets, the expansion of investment banking and securities trading and an increase in the complexity and internationalisation of financial products.

The global financial crisis of 2007 to 2008 exposed vulnerabilities in this model. Several United Kingdom banks experienced severe funding and capital problems and some institutions received extensive government support, including capital injections and guarantees. The crisis led to a sharp contraction in financial activity, large losses for some firms and a fall in the sector’s contribution to output and tax in the immediate aftermath.

=== Post crisis and post Brexit developments ===
Following the crisis, the United Kingdom overhauled its framework for regulating financial services. The Financial Services and Markets Act 2000 had created the Financial Services Authority as a single regulator for most financial firms, but this model was replaced after the crisis by a system in which the Bank of England took responsibility for macroprudential oversight through a new Financial Policy Committee and for the prudential regulation of banks, building societies and some investment firms through the Prudential Regulation Authority, while the Financial Conduct Authority was formed to regulate conduct of business and some prudential standards. Subsequent legislation and policy review further clarified the responsibilities of these bodies and the role of HM Treasury in setting the overall framework for regulation and supervision.

The United Kingdom’s exit from the European Union has shaped the development of the sector. Many United Kingdom based firms adjusted their structures and business models in response to the loss of automatic access to the European Union single market, while the government used new powers to review inherited European Union financial regulations. From 2022 the government announced a series of reform packages, including the Edinburgh reforms, the Mansion House reforms and the Leeds reforms, together with programmes such as the Future Regulatory Framework review and the publication of an annual State of the sector report on competitiveness. These packages aim to support innovation and international competitiveness while maintaining financial stability and consumer protection, and they have been accompanied by parliamentary and audit scrutiny of how regulators are adapting to change.

== Size and structure ==
Financial and insurance services form a substantial part of the United Kingdom economy. In 2023, the sector contributed about £208.2 billion in gross value added to the UK economy, around 8.8% of total economic output, making it the fourth largest UK industry by output. The wider financial system is large relative to the size of the domestic economy. In 2022, UK financial system assets were estimated at about £27 trillion, of which roughly half were held by banks, £1 trillion by the Bank of England and the remainder by insurance companies, pension funds and other financial institutions such as investment funds.

The industry is organised around a number of main subsectors. These include retail and commercial banking, wholesale and investment banking, insurance and reinsurance, asset and wealth management, market infrastructure such as payment systems and clearing houses, and a wide range of related professional services in law, accountancy and management consultancy. Within the wider financial and related professional services industry, TheCityUK estimates that in 2021 more than 1.1 million people worked directly in financial services, across activities such as banking, insurance, fund management and other financial services, and more than 1.3 million worked in related professional services. UK fund managers were reported to be responsible for around £11.6 trillion of financial assets in 2021.

The sector is geographically concentrated but not confined to London. In 2022, London accounted for just over half of total UK financial and insurance sector output and financial services made up about 19% of London's economic output. Outside the capital, there are significant clusters of financial and related professional services employment in cities such as Birmingham, Edinburgh, Glasgow, Leeds and Manchester, together with a number of regional centres that specialise in particular activities such as insurance, asset servicing or back office operations.

== Employment and taxation ==
=== Employment and skills ===
Financial and insurance services are a significant source of employment in the United Kingdom. In the first quarter of 2024 there were around 1.17 million jobs in the financial and insurance services sector, around 3.1% of all jobs in the UK and the twelfth largest industry by number of jobs. The number of jobs in the sector has been broadly stable since the early 1990s, although its share of total employment has edged down as the wider economy has grown.

Employment is concentrated in London but the industry supports jobs across the UK. In the first quarter of 2024 London accounted for about 422,000 financial services jobs, 36% of the UK total and around 6.4% of all jobs in London. The wider financial and related professional services industry, which includes legal, accounting and management consultancy firms as well as financial institutions, employed nearly 2.5 million people in 2021, about 7.6% of all UK employment, with around two thirds of these jobs based outside London. Subsequent analysis by TheCityUK suggests that in 2022 more than 2.4 million people worked in the wider industry, again around 7.5% of UK employment, with over two thirds of roles outside the capital.

=== Tax contribution ===
Financial services are an important source of tax revenue. HMRC reported that taxes from the banking sector alone, including income tax, national insurance contributions, corporation tax and sector specific taxes, raised £37.1 billion in 2023/24, about 3.5% of all UK tax receipts. Most of this came from pay as you earn income tax and national insurance contributions, which totalled £24.9 billion. Corporation tax from banks raised £9.3 billion, while the bank levy and bank surcharge together raised just under £3 billion.

Research for the City of London Corporation by PwC estimated that the financial sector contributed around £79.3 billion in taxes in the year to March 2023, around 9% of total UK government tax receipts in 2022/23. A separate survey for the City of London Corporation and TheCityUK found that UK based financial and related professional services contributed an estimated £110.2 billion in taxes in 2023, about 12.3% of total UK tax receipts, the highest share recorded since this series began. Earlier work for the City of London Corporation estimated that in the year to 31 March 2012 the financial services sector contributed about £63 billion in tax, around 11.6% of total receipts.

== International role and trade ==
=== Exports and trade surplus ===
The United Kingdom is one of the largest exporters of financial services. In 2023, exports of financial services were worth about £91.8 billion and imports were about £18.6 billion, giving a trade surplus of £73.2 billion. The United Kingdom exports much more financial services than it imports, so the sector makes a sizeable contribution to the overall trade balance in services.

After accounting for inflation, the value of financial services exports and their share of total services exports have generally fallen since the global financial crisis, and the financial services trade surplus in 2023 was around 28% lower than in 2008 in real terms. This reflects slower growth in some types of wholesale financial activity and faster growth in other kinds of services exports.

TheCityUK, an industry body, reported that the United Kingdom has consistently recorded the largest trade surplus in financial services of any country. Its assessments in 2024 and 2025 suggest that the United Kingdom had a surplus of around £92 billion in 2022 and about £79 billion, equivalent to around $98.1 billion, in 2023, ahead of other major centres such as the United States, Singapore, Switzerland and Luxembourg.

=== Trading partners and markets ===
Official data show that between 2017 and 2023 the proportion of United Kingdom financial services exports going to EU countries fell from about 40% to about 34%, while exports to non-EU countries faster in cash terms. Over the same period, exports of financial services to the United States, Switzerland, Canada, Hong Kong and Singapore increased by about 78% in cash terms, compared with about 29% for exports to the EU.

For trade in services as a whole, ONS analysis shows that the United States is the United Kingdom’s largest single trading partner. In 2023, the United Kingdom exported about £126.3 billion of services to the United States and imported about £57.4 billion, accounting for around one quarter of United Kingdom services exports and just under one fifth of services imports.

TheCityUK’s research on exporting from across Britain concluded that in 2021 nearly half of financial and related professional services exports originated outside London, with notable contributions from the South East, Scotland, the North West and other regions.

=== International competitiveness ===
London is widely regarded as an International financial centre, and the United Kingdom remains one of the leading hubs for cross border finance. TheCityUK’s analysis of the sector reports that the United Kingdom accounts for a large share of global foreign exchange turnover and cross border bank lending and hosts many overseas banks and other international financial institutions. These characteristics, together with the presence of related professional services such as law and accountancy, support the United Kingdom’s role in international finance.

The pattern of financial services trade has also been influenced by changes in the institutional framework. Since the United Kingdom’s withdrawal from the European Union, trade in financial services with EU countries has taken place under the Trade and Cooperation Agreement rather than under earlier single market arrangements, with more limited provisions for automatic access to markets. Firms have responded by adjusting their structures and cross border activities, for example by establishing subsidiaries within the EU to serve some clients while retaining significant operations in the United Kingdom.

== Regulation and supervision ==
Financial services in the United Kingdom are regulated within a statutory and institutional framework that is intended to support stability, protect consumers and promote effective competition, while allowing markets to function efficiently. The framework is set primarily by Acts of Parliament and by detailed rules made by independent regulators, overseen by HM Treasury. The UK's regional financial services sector is characterized by specialized intermediaries that facilitate market access.

=== Statutory framework ===
The main legislative basis for financial services regulation is the Financial Services and Markets Act 2000 (FSMA 2000), which established a single, comprehensive regime for regulating most financial services activities in the United Kingdom. FSMA 2000 created a system of regulated activities, set out the authorisation and supervision framework for firms and established arrangements for financial markets and exchanges.

Following the global financial crisis, the Financial Services Act 2012 amended FSMA 2000 and other legislation to reform the regulatory structure. It gave the Bank of England new responsibilities for macroprudential oversight through the Financial Policy Committee and created a new framework in which prudential and conduct regulation were carried out by separate bodies.

The Financial Services and Markets Act 2023 (FSMA 2023) provided for a further phase of reform in the context of the United Kingdom’s withdrawal from the European Union. FSMA 2023 gives HM Treasury powers to repeal and replace retained European Union law relating to financial services, transfers more responsibility for detailed rule making to the United Kingdom regulators and introduces new secondary objectives for the Prudential Regulation Authority and the Financial Conduct Authority related to growth and international competitiveness.

=== Principal regulators ===
HM Treasury is the government department responsible for the design of financial services legislation and the overall policy framework. It sponsors the main financial regulators, sets their statutory objectives through legislation and is accountable to Parliament for the effectiveness of the regulatory system.

The Bank of England is the United Kingdom’s central bank and has a range of responsibilities in financial regulation and stability policy. It hosts the Financial Policy Committee, which monitors systemic risks and can make recommendations and directions to address them, and it is responsible for the supervision of central counterparties and other recognised financial market infrastructure.

Within the Bank of England, the Prudential Regulation Authority (PRA) is responsible for the prudential regulation and supervision of banks, building societies, credit unions, insurers and certain investment firms. Its objectives include promoting the safety and soundness of the firms it regulates and, for insurers, contributing to securing an appropriate degree of protection for policyholders.

The Financial Conduct Authority (FCA) is a separate regulator responsible for regulating the conduct of around 50,000 financial services firms and financial markets in the United Kingdom. Its strategic objective is to ensure that markets function well, and its operational objectives relate to securing an appropriate degree of protection for consumers, protecting and enhancing the integrity of the United Kingdom financial system and promoting effective competition in the interests of consumers.

Other bodies have specific roles within the regulatory system. The Payment Systems Regulator regulates payment systems that are designated under the Financial Services (Banking Reform) Act 2013. The Financial Ombudsman Service provides an alternative dispute resolution service for certain financial disputes between consumers and firms, and the Financial Services Compensation Scheme offers compensation to eligible customers when authorised financial services firms fail.

=== Recent and planned reforms ===
The statutory and regulatory framework has been subject to ongoing review in the period after the financial crisis and after the United Kingdom’s withdrawal from the European Union. The Future Regulatory Framework review examined how financial services regulation should be adapted now that the United Kingdom has left the EU, and its conclusions informed the design of FSMA 2023 and related secondary legislation.

From 2022 onwards the United Kingdom government announced a series of reform packages and reviews, including the Edinburgh Reforms and the Mansion House reforms, which sought to update rules across banking, capital markets and insurance, encourage innovation and support the role of the United Kingdom as an international financial centre. In 2025 the Leeds reforms set out further plans to encourage investment and skilled jobs in financial services across the regions and nations of the United Kingdom.

== See also ==
- Banking in the United Kingdom
- Economy of London § Financial services
- Economy of the United Kingdom § Financial and business services
- Financial centre
- Financial services § Financial exports
- Global financial system
- Insurance in the United Kingdom
- List of banks in the United Kingdom
- List of institutional investors in the United Kingdom
- UK company law
