= List of institutional investors in the United Kingdom =

This is a list of institutional investors in the United Kingdom. Institutional investors manage other people's money by buying shares in companies, corporate bonds, gilts (i.e. government debt), commodities, foreign currencies, or combinations of each, or derivatives of them (i.e. options to buy, or other similar financial contracts. The main kinds of UK institutional investors are,

- pension funds (where beneficiaries are saving for retirement)
- insurance companies (where policyholders are insuring against risk, most importantly life insurance: effectively also a pension)
- mutual funds (including investment companies, investment trusts, or unit trusts, where people are saving surplus wealth for any purpose)
- sovereign wealth funds (government funds, often for saving wealth generated by natural resources)

Sovereign wealth funds are a recent addition, and grew following the Asian financial crisis from 1997, becoming important investors in the London Stock Exchange. Fund managers (usually known as investment advisers in the US), who typically belong to the same organisations as those running large mutual funds, play a critical role because normally the "primary" institutional investors delegate investment choices and corporate governance decisions to the fund manager. UK banks do not traditionally play an important role as institutional investors, as they do for instance in Germany.

The Institutional Investor Committee represents the interests of the NAPF, ABI, IMA, AITC and the British Merchant Banking and Securities House Association.

== Mutual funds ==
Representing the mutual fund and fund management industry is primarily the Investment Management Association (established in 2002, merging the Institutional Fund Managers Association and the Association of Unit Trusts and Investment Funds). The Association of Investment Companies is also a representation body, with an overlapping membership, but includes only businesses dealing in closed end investment companies.

These are the largest fund managers according to billions of pounds of assets under management.

Name	est.	AUM £bn	Description	Website
Legal & General	1836	25,223	British multinational financial services company based in London.	lgim.com
UBS Global Asset Management	1862	12,353	Investment branch of UBS AG, a Swiss global financial services company.	ubs.com
BlackRock	1988	10,142	US firm, and world's largest asset manager, formed by Larry Fink and Robert S. Kapito who previously worked at First Boston.	blackrock.com
Baillie Gifford	1907	9,439	British multinational asset management company based in Edinburgh, Scotland.	bailliegifford.com
Schroders	1804	6,994	British multinational asset management company.	schroders.com
State Street Global Advisors	1978	4,806	Founded as part of the State Street Corporation (est 1792), and the world's second largest asset manager.	ssga.com
Newton Investment Management		4,696		newton.co.uk
Capital International	1931	4,099	US fund manager.	capgroup.com
Aberdeen Asset Management	1983	3,628	Listed on the London Stock Exchange in 1991.	abderdeen-asset.com
Standard Life Investments	1825	3,175	Demutualised and listed on the London Stock Exchange in 2006.	www.standardlife.com
Allianz Global Investors	1998		A part of Allianz SE, German financial services company.	www.allianzgi.com
Investec Bank	1974		An international specialist banking and asset management group founded in Johannesburg.	investec.com
Threadneedle Asset Management			Acquired by Ameriprise Financial in 2003.	columbiathreadneedle.co.uk
Henderson Global Investors	1934		Has merged with Janus Capital Group in 2017 to create Janus Henderson.	.com
T Rowe Price	1937			troweprice.com
Fidelity International	1969		Operates as a private business since 1980, it provides investment management services.	fidelityinternational.com
M&G Investments	1931		Was an autonomous business within the Prudential Group. Became a public company in 2019.	mandg.com
Barclays Wealth				

== Pension funds ==
The Association of Member Nominated Trustees and the National Association of Pension Funds are the umbrella bodies representing the interests of pension funds collectively. The number of pension funds largely mirrors the number of companies, as pensions have often not merged on an industry-wide basis. Many pension funds for local councils fall within the umbrella group of the Local Government Pension Scheme, but as yet there is no consolidated management.

Name	est.	AUM £bn	Description	Website
BT Pension Scheme		39.6		
Universities Superannuation Scheme		38.6		
Royal Mail Pension Plan		12.4		
Electricity Supply Pension Scheme				
Mineworkers Pension Scheme				
RBS Group Pension Fund				
Railways Pension Scheme				
Barclays Bank UK Retirement Fund				
BP Pension Fund				
National Grid UK Pension Scheme				
British Coal Staff Superannuation Scheme				
Shell Contributory Pension Fund				
Greater Manchester Pension Fund		12.6		
Strathclyde Pension Fund				
British Steel Pension Scheme				
Lloyds TSB Group Pension Scheme				
BBC Pension Trust				
West Midlands Pension Fund				
HBOS Final Salary Pension Scheme				
GSK Pension Schemes				.com
ICI Pension Fund				
Rolls-Royce Pension Fund				.com
BA New Airways Pension Scheme				.com
BAE Systems Pension Scheme				.com
West Yorkshire Pension Scheme				.com
British Airways Pension Scheme				
HSBC Bank UK Pension Scheme				.com
Aviva Staff Pension Scheme				.com
Co-operative Group Pension Scheme (Pace)				

== Insurance companies ==
The Association of British Insurers is the umbrella body for UK insurance companies.

Name	est.	AUM £bn	Description	Website
Legal & General				.com
Aviva				.com
Prudential				.com
Old Mutual				.com
Standard Life				.com
Resolution				.com
Phoenix				.com
AEGON UK				.com
XL Group				.com
St. James's Place plc	1991	153.62		.com
RSA Insurance Group				.com
QBE Insurance				.com
Direct Line Insurance				.com
NFU Mutual				.com
FM Global				.com
AXA				.com
Royal London Asset Management	1988	159		.com
Allianz SE	1890			.com
Friends Life	2008		Defunct. Acquired by Aviva in 2015.	.com
Zurich Insurance	1872			.com
Royal London Group	1861	159		.com
Hiscox	1901			.com
Lloyds Banking Group	2009	173		.com
Association of British Insurers	1985		The ABI is the insurance industry lobbying and coordination body, with around 400 members.	www.abi.org.uk

== See also ==
- UK labour law and UK company law
- List of unions, and in the UK, Germany and the US
- List of largest United Kingdom employers
- FTSE 100 and FT 30, S&P 100, HDAX and DAX
- List of hedge funds
- List of private equity firms
