= List of labor unions in the United States =

Unions exist to represent the interests of workers, who form the membership. Under US labor law, the National Labor Relations Act 1935 is the primary statute which gives US unions rights. The rights of members are governed by the Labor Management Reporting and Disclosure Act of 1959.

== Largest unions ==
Name	est.	Members (approx)	Description	Constitution	Website
National Education Association (NEA)	1857	2,839,808	Public school employees including but not limited to teachers, Education Support Professionals, cafeteria workers, bus drivers, guidance counselors, nurses, administrative assistants, secretaries, psychologists, and librarians.	2019	NEA
Service Employees International Union (SEIU)	1921	1,901,161	RNs, professional, technical and non-professional health care workers; public employees; janitorial and security employees.	2012	SEIU
American Federation of State, County and Municipal Employees (AFSCME)	1932	1,459,511	Employees of state, county, and municipal governments.	2012	AFSCME
Teamsters	1903	1,400,000	Full name: International Brotherhood of Teamsters. Truck drivers; warehouse workers; miscellaneous trades.	2016	Teamsters
United Food and Commercial Workers (UFCW)	1979	1,300,000	Retail store and distribution employees.	2008	UFCW
United Auto Workers (UAW)	1935	391,000	Full name: International Union, United Automobile, Aerospace, and Agricultural Implement Workers of America. Automobile, truck, farm equipment, and construction equipment manufacturing workers.	2010	UAW
United Steelworkers (USW)	1942	860,264	Steel mill workers; related trades.		USW
American Federation of Teachers (AFT)	1916	1,700,000	Public school teachers, RNs, professional, technical and non-professional health care workers.	2022	AFT
International Brotherhood of Electrical Workers (IBEW)	1891	820,000	Electrical manufacturing workers; electric utility workers.	2012	IBEW
Laborers' International Union of North America (LIUNA)	1903	669,772	Miscellaneous construction workers; other trades.	2022	LIUNA
International Association of Machinists and Aerospace Workers (IAMAW)	1888	653,781	Aircraft manufacturing workers; aircraft maintenance and repair workers.	2017	IAM
Communications Workers of America (CWA)	1947	545,638	Telecommunication, customer service, broadcasting, public sector, healthcare and other workers.	2013	CWA
United Brotherhood of Carpenters and Joiners of America (UBCJA)	1881	522,416	Building industry carpenters and millwrights.	2015	UBC
International Longshore and Warehouse Union (ILWU)	1937	424,579	Freight handlers at ports.	2016	ILWU
International Union of Operating Engineers (IUOE)	1896	392,584	Operators of construction equipment; stationary engineers.	2015	IUOE
United Association (UA)	1889	324,043	Full name: United Association of Journeymen and Apprentices of the Plumbing, Pipefitting and Sprinkler Fitting Industry of the United States and Canada.	2021	UA
National Association of Letter Carriers (NALC)	1889	292,221	United States Postal Service mail delivery workers in urban areas.	2016	NALC
American Federation of Government Employees (AFGE)	1932	289,023	Miscellaneous U.S. federal government workers.	2012	AFGE
American Postal Workers Union (APWU)	1971	286,700	United States Postal Service workers other than letter carriers.		APWU
International Association of Fire Fighters (IAFF)	1918	331,003	Professional firefighters and emergency medical service workers.	2021	IAFF
UNITE HERE	2004	301,886	Hotel, casino, restaurant, and commercial food service workers and garment manufacturing employees. Formerly UNITE (Union of Needletrades, Industrial and Textile Employees) and HERE, merged in 2004.	2024	UNITE HERE
National Postal Mail Handlers Union (NPMHU)	1912	269,204	A division of LIUNA. United States Postal Service workers other than letter carriers.	2022	NPMHU
Amalgamated Transit Union (ATU)	1892	190,000	Mass transit service workers.	2022	ATU
American Nurses Association (ANU)	1897	152,294	Professional association for registered nurses.		ANA
International Alliance of Theatrical Stage Employees (IATSE)	1893	168,000	Non-performing entertainment workers in Theater, Motion Picture & Television, & Trade Shows		IATSE
International Association of Sheet Metal, Air, Rail and Transportation Workers (IASMARTW)	1888	148,806			SMART
International Union of Painters and Allied Trades (IUPAT)	1887	127,278	Construction-industry painters, glaziers, drywall finishers, sign & display workers.	2020	IUPAT
International Association of Bridge, Structural, Ornamental, and Reinforcing Iron Workers (IABSORIW)	1896	125,437		2021	IW
Transport Workers Union of America (TWUA)	1934	125,398	Mass transit, railroad, and airline workers.	2017	TWU
Office and Professional Employees International Union (OPEIU)	1945	105,000	White-collar workers in the public and private sector.		OPEIU
National Rural Letter Carriers' Association (NRLCU)	1903	104,717	United States Postal Service mail delivery workers in rural areas.	2017	NRLCA

== AFL-CIO ==
This is a list of AFL–CIO affiliated member unions:

- Air Line Pilots Association (ALPA)
- Amalgamated Transit Union (ATU)
- American Federation of Government Employees (AFGE)
- American Federation of Musicians of the United States and Canada (AFM)
- American Federation of School Administrators (AFSA)
- American Federation of State, County and Municipal Employees (AFSCME)
- American Federation of Teachers (AFT)
- American Postal Workers Union (APWU)
- American Radio Association (ARA)
- American Train Dispatchers Association (ATDA)
- Associated Actors and Artistes of America (4As)
  - Actors' Equity Association (AEA)
  - American Guild of Musical Artists (AGMA)
  - American Guild of Variety Artists (AGVA)
  - The Guild of Italian American Actors (GIAA)
  - Screen Actors Guild-American Federation of Television and Radio Artists (SAG-AFTRA)
- Bakery, Confectionery, Tobacco Workers and Grain Millers' International Union (BCTGM)
- Brotherhood of Railroad Signalmen (BRS)
- California School Employees Association (CSEA)
- Communications Workers of America (CWA)
  - Association of Flight Attendants (AFA-CWA)
  - Industrial Division, CWA (IUE-CWA)
  - National Association of Broadcast Employees and Technicians (NABET-CWA)
  - The Newspaper Guild (TNG-CWA)
  - Printing, Publishing and Media Workers (PPMW-CWA)
- Farm Labor Organizing Committee (FLOC)
- Gay and Lesbian Labor Activists Network (GALLAN)
- International Alliance of Theatrical Stage Employees, Moving Picture Technicians, Artists and Allied Crafts of the United States, Its Territories and Canada (IATSE)
- International Association of Bridge, Structural, Ornamental and Reinforcing Iron Workers (Ironworkers)
- International Association of Fire Fighters (IAFF)
- International Association of Heat and Frost Insulators and Allied Workers
- International Association of Machinists and Aerospace Workers (IAM)
  - Transportation Communications International Union
- International Association of Sheet Metal, Air, Rail and Transportation Workers (SMART)
- International Brotherhood of Boilermakers, Iron Ship Builders, Blacksmiths, Forgers and Helpers (IBB)
- International Brotherhood of Electrical Workers (IBEW)
- International Federation of Professional and Technical Engineers (IFPTE)
- International Longshoremen's Association (ILA)
- International Organization of Masters, Mates & Pilots (MMP)
- International Plate Printers, Die Stampers and Engravers Union of North America
- International Union of Allied Novelty and Production Workers (Novelty and Production Workers)
- International Union of Bricklayers and Allied Craftworkers (BAC)
- International Union of Elevator Constructors (IUEC)
- International Union of Operating Engineers (IUOE)
- International Union of Painters and Allied Trades (IUPAT)
- International Union of Police Associations (IUPA)
- Laborers' International Union of North America (LIUNA)
  - National Postal Mail Handlers Union (NPMHU)
- Major League Baseball Players Association (MLBPA)
- Marine Engineers Beneficial Association (MEBA)
- National Air Traffic Controllers Association (NATCA)
- National Association of Letter Carriers (NALC)
- National Football League Players Association (NFLPA)
- National Hockey League Players' Association (NHLPA)
- National Nurses United (NNU)
- National Taxi Workers' Alliance (NTWA)
- National Women's Soccer League Players Association (NWSLPA)
- Office and Professional Employees International Union (OPEIU)
- Operative Plasterers' and Cement Masons' International Association of the United States and Canada (OPCMIA)
- Professional Aviation Safety Specialists (PASS)
- Professional Hockey Players' Association (PHPA)
- Seafarers International Union of North America (SIU)
  - American Maritime Officers (AMO)
- Service Employees International Union (SEIU)
- Transport Workers Union of America (TWU)
- UNITE HERE
- United Association of Journeymen and Apprentices of the Plumbing and Pipe Fitting Industry of the United States and Canada (UA)
- United Automobile, Aerospace and Agricultural Implement Workers of America International Union (UAW)
- United Food and Commercial Workers (UFCW)
- United Mine Workers of America (UMWA)
- United Steelworkers (USW)
- United Union of Roofers, Waterproofers and Allied Workers (Roofers and Waterproofers)
- Utility Workers Union of America (UWUA)
- Writers Guild of America East (WGAE)

== Independent ==
=== National ===
- Adult Performance Artists Guild
- Aircraft Mechanics Fraternal Association
- Allied Pilots Association
- Association of Professional Flight Attendants
- Association of Western Pulp and Paper Workers
- Campaign Workers Guild
- Directors Guild of America
- Fraternal Order of Police
- Independent Pilots Association
- Industrial Workers of the World
- International Longshore and Warehouse Union
- International Union of Journeymen and Allied Trades
  - Home Healthcare Workers of America
  - National Organization of Industrial Trade Unions
  - United Public Service Employees Union
  - United Service Workers Union
- Jockeys' Guild
- Major League Baseball Players Association
- Major League Baseball Umpires Association
- National Alliance of Postal and Federal Employees
- National Basketball Coaches Association
- National Education Association
- National Emergency Medical Services Association
- National Hockey League Players' Association
- National Rural Letter Carriers' Association
- National Treasury Employees Union
- National Weather Service Employees Organization
- National Women's Soccer League Players Association
- National Writers Union
- Premier Hockey Federation Players' Association
- Professional Lacrosse Players' Association
- Southwest Airlines' Pilots Association
- Stage Directors and Choreographers Society
- United Brotherhood of Carpenters and Joiners of America
- United Electrical, Radio and Machine Workers of America
- United Independent Technology Technicians of America
- United Nurses and Allied Professionals
- United States Rugby Players Association
- U.S. National Soccer Team Players Association
- U.S. Women's National Team Players Association
- Writers Guild of America West

=== State and local ===
- Boston Police Patrolmen's Association
- Dallas Police Association
- Florida Police Benevolent Association
- Los Angeles
  - Association for Los Angeles Deputy Sheriffs
  - Los Angeles Police Protective League
  - Los Angeles Sheriff's Professional Association
  - United Firefighters of Los Angeles City
- New Jersey Firefighters Mutual Benevolent Association
- New York City
  - Detectives' Endowment Association
  - Lieutenants Benevolent Association
  - Police Benevolent Association of the City of New York
  - Sergeants Benevolent Association
- San Francisco Police Officers Association
- State of Hawaii Organization of Police Officers

== Professional sports labor unions ==
Name	Year established	Affiliation	League(s)
National Basketball Players Association	1954	Independent	National Basketball Association
National Football League Players Association	1956	AFL-CIO	National Football League
Major League Baseball Players Association	1966	AFL-CIO	Major League Baseball
National Hockey League Players' Association	1967	AFL-CIO	National Hockey League
Professional Hockey Players' Association	1967	AFL-CIO	American Hockey League & ECHL
Professional Lacrosse Players' Association	1991	Independent	National Lacrosse League
MLS Players Association	2003	AFL-CIO	Major League Soccer
Women's National Basketball Players Association	1998	AFL-CIO	Women's National Basketball Association
National Women's Soccer League Players Association	2015	AFL-CIO	National Women's Soccer League
United Soccer League Players Association	2018	AFL-CIO	United Soccer League
Professional Women's Hockey League Players Association	2023	AFL-CIO	Professional Women's Hockey League

== Union reform groups ==
- Labor Notes
- Teamsters for a Democratic Union

== See also ==
- Labor unions in the United States
- List of trade unions in Canada
- List of trade unions in France
- List of trade unions in Germany
- List of trade unions in the United Kingdom
- United States labor law
