= Kabine =

Kabine may refer to:

- Kabiné Komara (born 1950), Prime Minister of Guinea
- Heinkel Kabine, car
- KabineKlar, German trade union for flight attendants
- Rockford Kabine, German artist group
