= Dyke & Dryden =

First Black-owned multi-million pound business enterprise in the UK

- Industry: Cosmetics, hair care, retail, wholesale
- Founded: May 1965
- Key people: Len Dyke; Dudley Dryden; Tony Wade (Director)
- Products: Afro hair care, skin cosmetics, music records (formerly)

Dyke & Dryden was a British cosmetics and hair care company based in Tottenham, London. Founded in 1965, it is historically recognized as the first Black-owned multi-million-pound business enterprise in the United Kingdom.

The company broke commercial barriers by manufacturing and distributing specialist Black hair care products, becoming a foundational pillar for the development of modern Black British salons and barbershops.

== History ==
=== Origins and early years ===
The enterprise was established in May 1965 by Jamaican immigrants Lincoln "Len" Dyke and Dudley Dryden at a retail space located at 126 West Green Road in Tottenham. Initially, the business operated as a records and cosmetics shop, notably importing and selling reggae music directly from Jamaica to connect the Caribbean diaspora living in the United Kingdom.

In 1968, Montserrat-born businessman Anthony "Tony" Wade joined the partnership, cementing the leadership trio that would scale the enterprise nationally. By 1973, the business shifted its primary focus away from music retail to concentrate fully on the growing, untapped demand for African and Caribbean hair and skin cosmetics.

=== Commercial growth and barrier-breaking ===
During the 1960s and 1970s, major mainstream British manufacturing companies and high street brands largely overlooked Black consumers, leaving a massive gap in the market for specialist Afro hair care. Dyke & Dryden successfully filled this void by developing, manufacturing, and distributing an extensive array of dedicated products.

The company had to overcome institutional racial discrimination and prejudice to expand, notably funding their initial growth entirely with their own personal capital because contemporary High Street commercial banks routinely refused to offer loans to Black-owned businesses. In one notable instance, despite the business having an annual turnover breaking £1 million, mainstream banks still turned them down for a minor £5,000 overdraft request. Despite these barriers, the founders successfully scaled the operation to become Britain's very first Black multi-million-pound enterprise.

== Key products and cultural events ==
With a wide portfolio of cosmetics, Dyke and Dryden became a household name for Black hair styling formulations, including its signature "Super Curl" and "Natural Beauty" lines of holding sprays, hair sheen, and scalp treatments.

Beyond retail manufacturing, the company also launched and ran the Afro Hair and Beauty Show (later known as the Afro Hair and Beauty Exhibition). This event grew into one of the major annual international exhibitions in the beauty industry, providing a critical global showcase for Black stylists, brands, and consumers.

== Legacy ==
Dyke & Dryden is widely credited with shaping the infrastructure of the Black British grooming industry. Prior to their entry into the market, professional spaces catering to Black hair texture were rare; the brand's expansive wholesale distribution directly enabled the widespread growth and development of independent Caribbean and African barber shops and hairdressing salons across the UK throughout the late 20th century.

A significant archive of original Dyke & Dryden product packaging, marketing material, and photographs is preserved by the Bruce Castle Museum and Archive in Haringey. In recognition of their trailblazing contributions to British business, the trio has been commemorated with a memorial plaque at the site of their original Tottenham premises.

== See also ==
- Black British history
- Windrush generation
- Economy of London
