= List of trade unions in Germany =

This is a list of trade unions in Germany, which play an important part of German labour law and European labour law.

== Trade union federations ==
The Deutscher Gewerkschaftsbund, established 1949, is the most important union organisation. After many mergers it only now consists of 8 trade unions. It mediates inter-union disputes and organises member unions so they do not impede on each other's membership. It follows the Einheitsgewerkschaft principle. In its substantive politics it is aligned mostly with the SPD. Members are not bound by DGB policies. The representation in the DGB is democratic, so in practice IG Metall and ver.di dominate the agenda and policy with the most members.

== Individual unions ==
There are 8 unions, following a long series of mergers, affiliated to the largest German trade union confederation, the Deutsche Gewerkschaftsbund (DGB).

Name	Est.	Members	Description	Const.	Website
Industriegewerkschaft Metall	1949	2,270,000	IG Metall	2012	igmetall.de
Vereinte Dienstleistungsgewerkschaft	2001	2,040,000	Ver.di	2015	verdi.de
IG Bergbau, Chemie, Energie	1997	660,000	IG BCE	2013	igbce.de
IG Bauen-Agrar-Umwelt	1996	281,000	IG BAU had 720,000 members in 1996.	2013	igbau.de
Gewerkschaft Erziehung und Wissenschaft	1948	272,000	GEW	2016	gew.de
Eisenbahn- und Verkehrsgewerkschaft	2010	197,000	Formerly known as Transnet.	2016	
Gewerkschaft Nahrung-Genuss-Gaststätten	1949	205,000 (2010)	NGG	2014	ngg.net
Gewerkschaft der Polizei	1959	175,000	GdP	2014	www.gdp.de
Deutscher Gewerkschaftsbund	1949	6,105,000	The DGB is the primary trade union federation for Germany.		dgb.de

There are 39 trade unions under the Deutsche Beamte Bund (dbb).

Name	Est.	Members	Description	Website
Deutsche Polizeigewerkschaft	1951	94.000		
Komba Gewerkschaft	1920	80.000		komba.de
Gewerkschaft Deutscher Lokomotivführer	1867	34.000		
Deutscher Beamtenbund und Tarifunion	1918	1,275,000	The dbb is the German Civil Service Federation.	dbb.de

There are 14 unions affiliated to the Christlicher Gewerkschaftsbund.

There are a number of other, non-affiliated unions with a total of between 200,000 and 300,000 members.

- KabineKlar German Flight Attendants Union
- FAU Free Workers' Union is the primary anarcho-syndicalist union in Germany.
- Marburger Bund (doctors' union)

== See also ==
- List of trade unions in France
- List of trade unions in the United Kingdom
- List of trade unions in the United States
- List of unions
- Jugend- und Auszubildendenvertretung, a statutory young employees' organisation
- Works council
