= Agriculture in London =

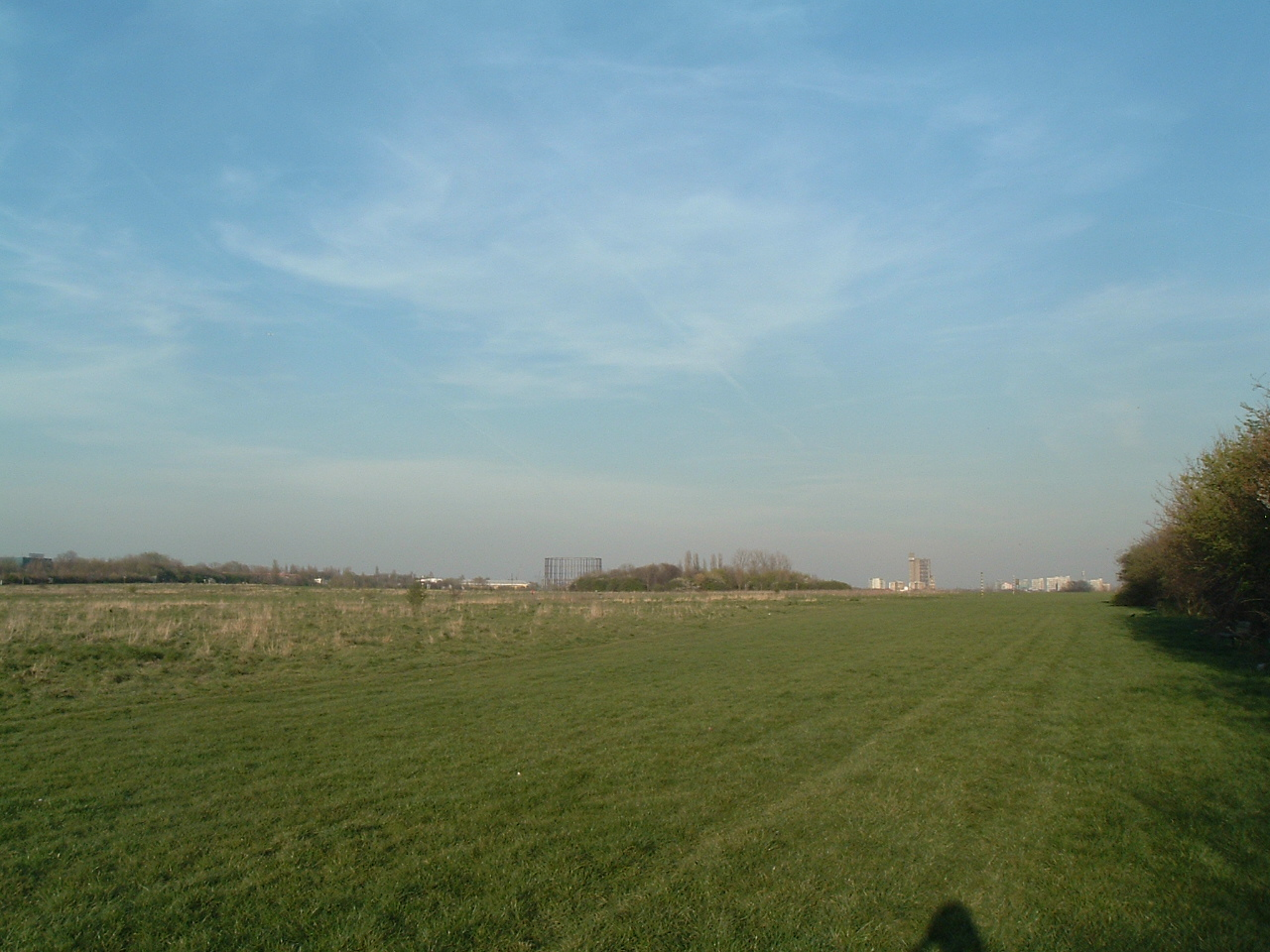
Wormwood Scrubs, a part of the common land

Agriculture in London is a rather small enterprise, with only 8.6% of the Greater London area being used for commercial farming, nearly all of which is close to Greater London's outer boundaries. There are a few city farms closer to the centre of the city and about 30,000 allotments. There are 135.66 square kilometres (135,660,000 m^{2}) of farmland in the Greater London area. Nearly all of the farmland in the London area is a basis for the growing culture.

Farmland in London is predominantly present in five boroughs: Bromley (of which an estimated 35% is farmland), Havering (estimated 44%), Hillingdon (estimated 23%), Enfield (estimate 22%) and Barnet (estimate 17%). The Lea Valley is a significant centre for salad crops.

== History ==
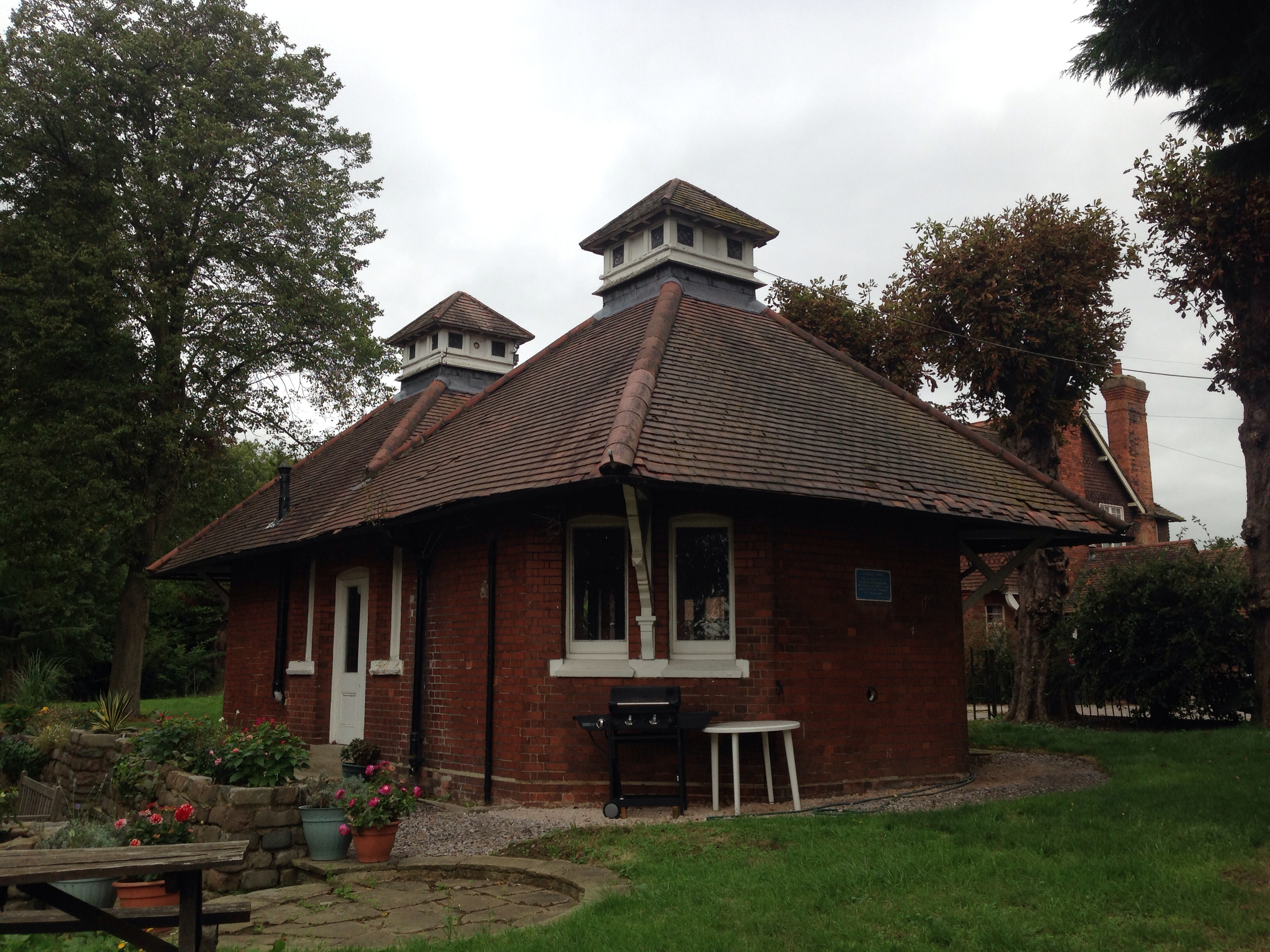
The dairy at College Farm, Barnet

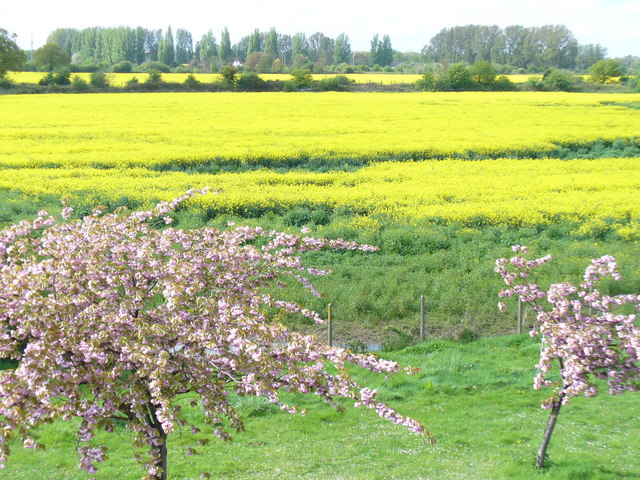
A field of rape, Felthamhill

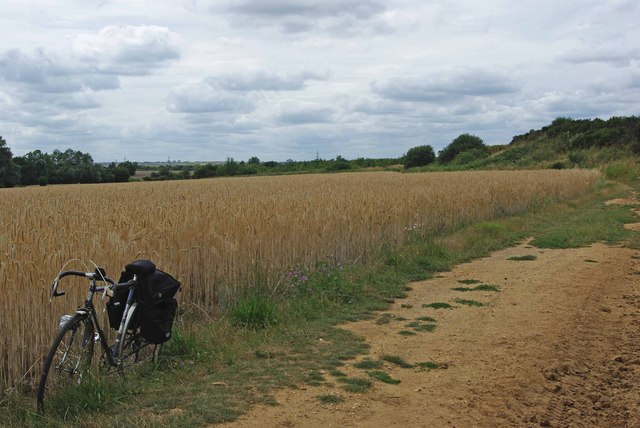
A Havering barley field

Many areas which now form part of Greater London were formerly rural and agricultural outskirts and still bear names which indicate this past: Ealing Common, Lincoln's Inn Fields, Shepherd's Bush and Wormwood Scrubs, for example.

In 1938, the Greater London area became the first region in Britain to use a green belt policy and introduced the Metropolitan Green Belt in order to combat urban sprawl. A 2005 agricultural census carried out by ADAS showed that 423 holdings were located in the London part of the metropolitan green belt, around 0.25% of the total number in Britain. The total land managed was 13,608 hectares, half of which was rented. Less than 10% of the land farmed was used for cultivation of organic materials, and the total contribution that farming made to the economy, excluding diversification activities, was less than £8 m. However, London's agricultural industry was shown to be much more reliant on activities pertaining to diversification, with just under a third of farm income attributed to it, exceeding the national average. The report stated that whilst farming was not a significant part of London's economy, it did have a vital role to play.

The report showed that farming was mainly concentrated in northeast London, but only included figures on arable farming (the surrounding regions of East and South East are where cereal farming is most prevalent). The report commented that livestock farming had decreased in recent years due to a lack of infrastructure (poor access to abattoirs and markets) and problems associated with being located close to the urban fringe (such as dogs). The report concluded that the low levels of stock in relation to permanent pasture suggested equine usage, something often related to diversification activities; the figures produced in the survey showed that 37% of London's diversification activities were equine related. Horticultural activities were mainly confined to the east of London, south of the River Thames.

This survey, as well as one carried out by Farmer's Voice in 2004, showed that the majority of farmers (47% and 35%) felt that planning restrictions, which are more widely and stringently enforced in the green belt, were the greatest barrier to diversification. The next highest was a lack of capital, and both polls showed that the Common Agricultural Policy of the EU was perceived to be smallest obstacle towards furthering diversification. The profitability of agriculture in the London green belt was shown to have increased: in 1999, only 4% of London farms reported an increased or maintained profit level, whereas 27% did in 2008. Forty-eight percent said they feared for their business's survival in 1999; 23% felt this way in 2008.

== 2008 developments ==
In an effort to boost the efforts of urban farming in the Greater London area, a conference was called on 1 July 2008 entitled "Growing Food for London". Organized by the London Parks and Green Spaces Forum, and as part of the London Festival of Architecture, solutions were sought to encourage so called "fringe farmers" (farmers on the fringe of urban areas) by assessing their needs in urban areas. The impetus for the conference was the rising cost of fuel, and the requisite need for food supplies to be provided closer to urban areas to keep food costs low.

== See also ==
- Agriculture in the United Kingdom
- Economy of London
