= List of trade unions in France =

A list of trade unions in France:

- Five confederations recognized by the state as representative trade union:
  - Confédération générale du travail (CGT)
  - Confédération Française Démocratique du Travail (CFDT)
  - Confédération générale du travail - Force Ouvrière (FO)
  - Confédération Française des Travailleurs Chrétiens (CFTC)
  - Confédération Française de l'Encadrement - Confédération Générale des Cadres (CFE-CGC)
- Other large unions:
  - Union nationale des syndicats autonomes (UNSA)
  - Solidaires Unitaires Démocratiques (SUD)
- Regional Unions:
  - Confédération générale du travail - Martinique (CGTM) in Martinique
  - Confédération générale du travail de Guadeloupe (CGTG) in Guadeloupe
  - Corsican Workers' Trade Union (STC) in Corsica
  - Syndicat des Travailleurs de Bretagne (STB) in Brittany
  - Langile Abertzaleen Batzordeak (LAB) in Basque country
  - Union syndicale des travailleurs kanaks et des exploités (USTKE) in New Caledonia
- Small unions:
  - Confédération nationale du travail-Vignole (CNT-F)
  - Confédération nationale du travail-AIT (CNT-AIT)
  - Confédération nationale du travail-Solidarité Ouvrière (CNT-SO)
  - Confédération autonome du travail (CAT)
- Sectorial Union:
  - Fédération Syndicale Unitaire (FSU)
  - Fédération générale autonome des fonctionnaires (FGAF)
  - Alliance Police nationale
  - Syndicat de la Magistrature (SM)
  - Union syndicale des magistrats (USM)
  - Syndicat du travail sexuel (STRASS)
  - Fédération autonome de la fonction publique territoriale (FA-FPT)
  - Syndicat national des journalistes (SNJ)
  - Syndicat des Travailleurs et Travailleuses du Jeu Vidéo (STJV)
  - Association Professionnelle de la Critique de théâtre, de musique et de danse
- Historic unions:
  - Confédération Générale du Travail Unitaire (CGT-U) a scission from the CGT from 1921 to 1936 when it fused back in the CGT
  - Confédération Générale du Travail-Syndicaliste Révolutionnaire (CGT-SR) an anarchist scission from the CGT-U present from 1926 to 1939, refounded in the CNT
  - Fédération nationale des Jaunes de France a company union present from 1902 to 1912

== See also ==
- List of trade unions
- List of trade unions in the United Kingdom
- List of trade unions in the United States
- List of trade unions in Germany
