= Greater London =

Metropolitan area in England

Greater London and London (region)
- Ceremonial county and region
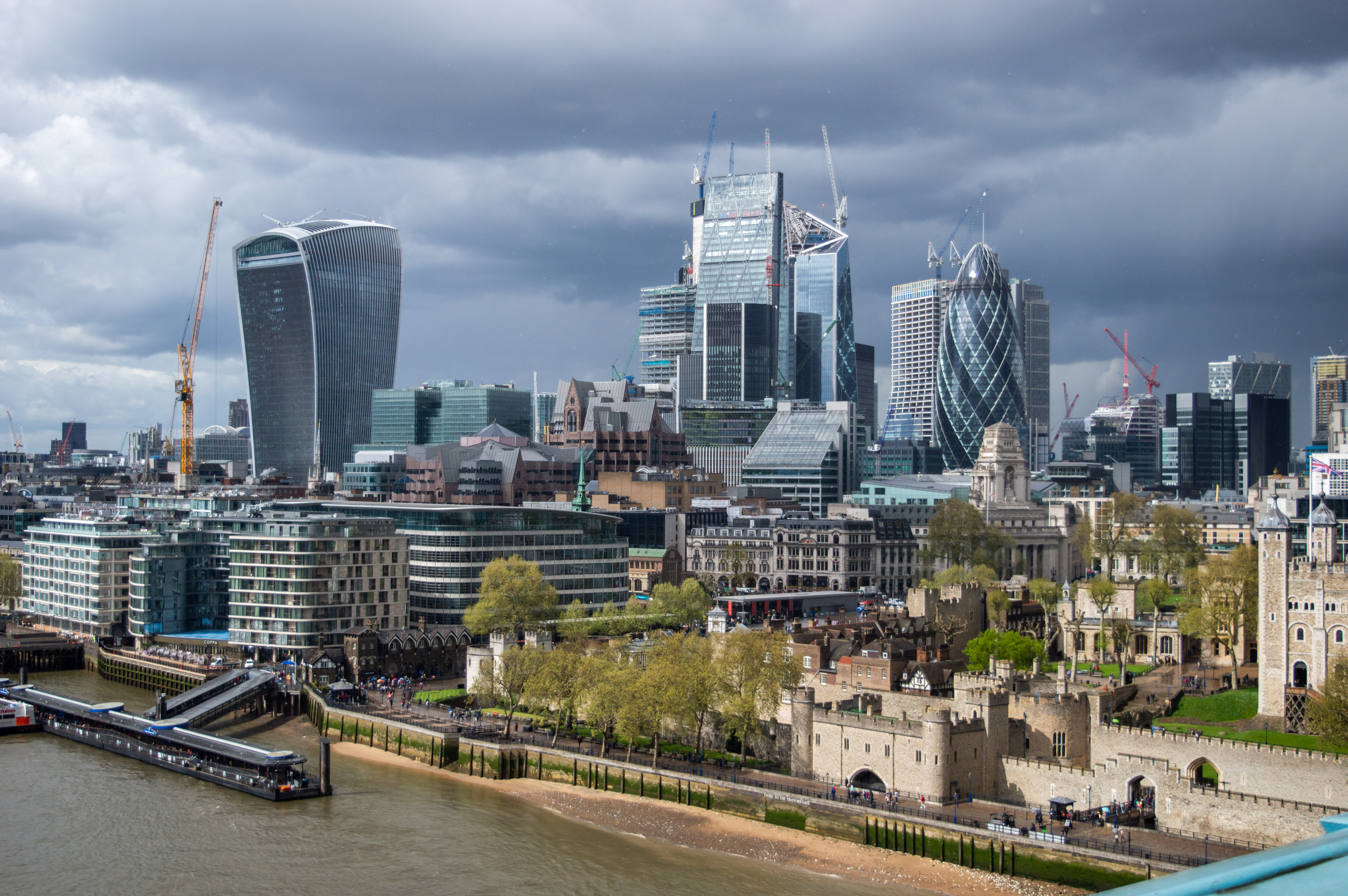
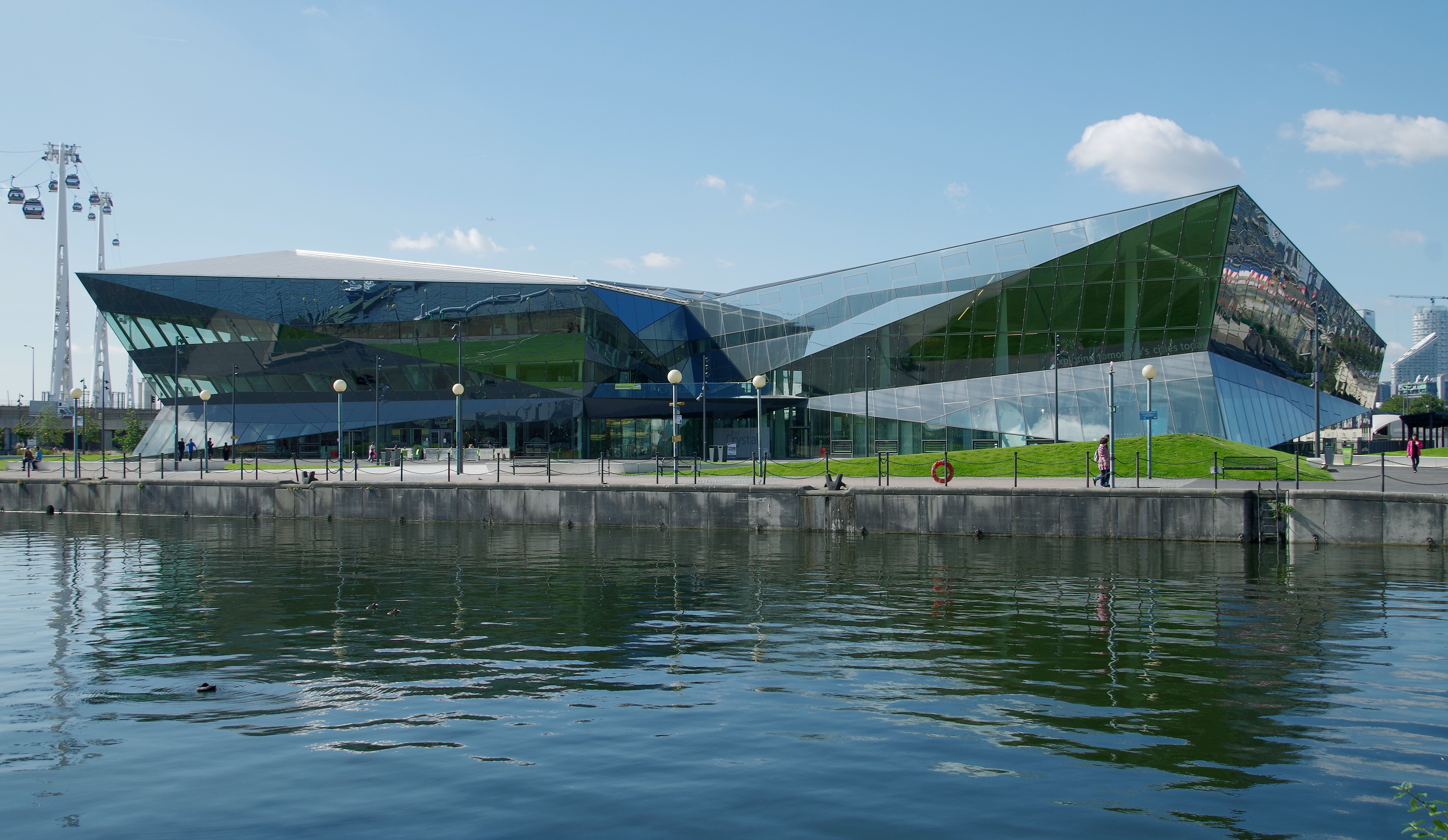
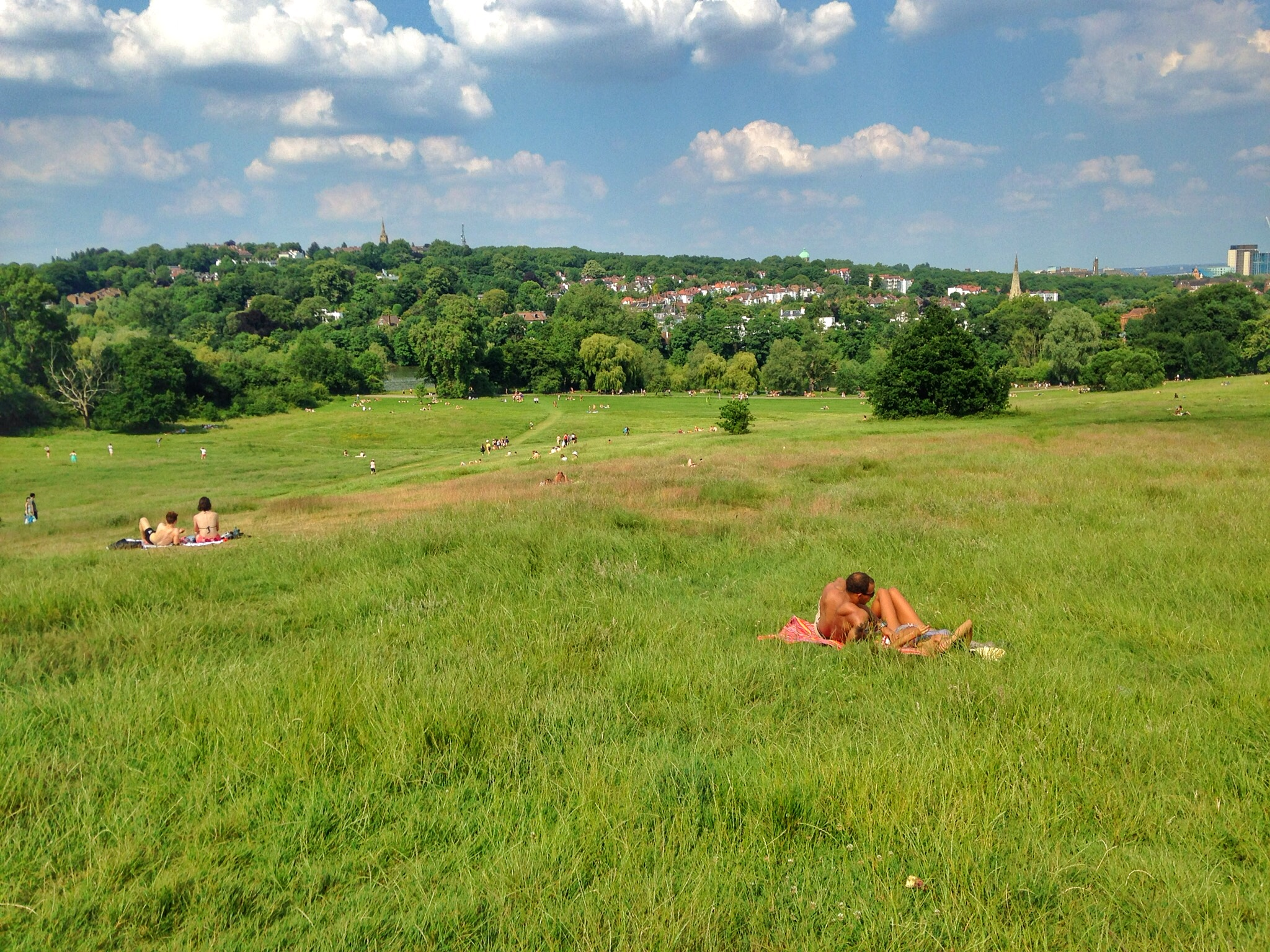
- The City of London; City Hall in Newham, the headquarters of the Greater London Authority; and Hampstead Heath

- Greater London ceremonial county (red) within England. The small enclave in its centre is the City of London (white). Together they form the Greater London administrative area.
- Coordinates: 51°31′N 0°06′W
- Sovereign state: United Kingdom
- Constituent country: England
- Established: 1 April 1965
- Established by: London Government Act 1963
- Preceded by: County of London
- Time zone: UTC+0 (GMT)
  - Summer (DST): UTC+1 (BST)
- UK Parliament: 75 MPs
- Police: City of London Police; Metropolitan Police
- Ceremonial county
- Lord Lieutenant: Ken Olisa
- High Sheriff: Dhruv Prashant Patel
- Area: 1,569 km^{2} (606 sq mi)
  - Rank: 37th of 48
- Population (2024): 9,074,625
  - Rank: 1st of 48
  - Density: 5,783/km^{2} (14,980/sq mi)
- Region
- Government: Greater London Authority • Mayor Sadiq Khan • London Assembly
- Admin HQ: City Hall
- Area: 1,572 km^{2} (607 sq mi)
- Population (2025): 9,122,909
  - Density: 5,804/km^{2} (15,030/sq mi)
- GSS code: E12000007 (region); E61000001 (GLA)
- ITL: TLI
- Website: london.gov.uk

The City of London and the 32 London boroughs
- List: City of London; City of Westminster; Kensington and Chelsea; Hammersmith and Fulham; Wandsworth; Lambeth; Southwark; Tower Hamlets; Hackney; Islington; Camden; Brent; Ealing; Hounslow; Richmond upon Thames; Kingston upon Thames; Merton; Sutton; Croydon; Bromley; Lewisham; Greenwich; Bexley; Havering; Barking and Dagenham; Redbridge; Newham; Waltham Forest; Haringey; Enfield; Barnet; Harrow; Hillingdon

Greater London is an administrative area in England, coterminous with the London region, containing most of the continuous urban area of London. It contains 33 local government districts: the 32 London boroughs, which form a ceremonial county also called Greater London, and the City of London, which is a separate ceremonial county. The Greater London Authority is responsible for strategic local government across the region, and regular local government is the responsibility of the borough councils and the City of London Corporation. Greater London is bordered by the ceremonial counties of Hertfordshire to the north, Essex to the north-east, Kent to the south-east, Surrey to the south, and Berkshire and Buckinghamshire to the west.

Greater London has a land area of 1,572 km^{2} (607 sq mi) and had an estimated population of 9,122,909 in 2025. The ceremonial county of Greater London is only slightly smaller, with an area of 1,569 km^{2} (606 sq mi) and a population of 9,074,625 in 2024. The area is almost entirely urbanised and contains the majority of the Greater London Built-up Area, which extends into Hertfordshire, Essex, Kent, Surrey, and Berkshire and in 2011 had a population of 9,787,426. None of the administrative area, region, or ceremonial county hold city status, but both the City of London and City of Westminster do. The area was historically part of Middlesex, Essex, Surrey, Kent and Hertfordshire.

The River Thames is the defining geographic feature of the area, entering it near Hampton in the west and flowing east before exiting downstream of Dagenham. Several tributaries of the Thames flow through the area, but are now mostly culverted and form part of London's sewerage system. The land immediately north and south of the river is flat, but rises to low hills further away, notably Hampstead Heath, Shooter's Hill, and Sydenham Hill. The area's highest point is Westerham Heights (245 m; 804 ft), part of the North Downs. In the north-east the area contains part of Epping Forest, an ancient woodland.

The City of London has had its own government since the Anglo-Saxon period. The first London-wide directly elected local government was the London County Council, established for the County of London in 1889, which covered the core of the urban area. In 1965 the county was abolished and replaced by Greater London, a two-tier administrative area governed by the Greater London Council, thirty-two London boroughs, and the City of London Corporation. The Greater London Council was abolished in 1986, and its responsibilities largely taken over by the boroughs. The Greater London Authority was formed in 2000.

== Administrative history ==
The term "Greater London" was used before it was established by statute in 1965. It referred to the Metropolitan Police District, the area served by the Metropolitan Water Board, the London Passenger Transport Area, and the area defined by the Registrar General as the "Greater London Conurbation". The term was also used for the Greater London Arterial Road Programme, devised between 1913 and 1916, and the Greater London Planning Region, devised in 1927, which occupied 1,856 square miles (4,810 km^{2}) and included 9 million people.

=== Proposals to expand the County of London ===
Arms of the former London County Council

Although the London County Council (LCC) and County of London were created in 1889, the area did not cover all of London. London's built-up area, postal district, transport network and Metropolitan Police District, extended vastly beyond the boundaries of the new administrative county. Many of the LCC housing projects, including the vast Becontree Estate, were also outside its boundaries. The LCC pressed for an alteration in its boundaries soon after the end of the First World War, noting that within the Metropolitan and City Police Districts there were 122 housing authorities. A Royal Commission on London Government was set up to consider the issue. The LCC proposed a vast new area for Greater London, with a boundary somewhere between the Metropolitan Police District and the home counties. Protests were made at the possibility of including Windsor, Slough and Eton in the authority. The commission made its report in 1923, rejecting the LCC's scheme. Two minority reports favoured change beyond the amalgamation of smaller urban districts, including both smaller borough councils and a central authority for strategic functions. The London Traffic Act 1924 was a result of the commission. Reform of local government in the County of London and its environs was next considered by the Royal Commission on Local Government in Greater London, chaired by Sir Edwin Herbert, which issued the 'Herbert Report' after three years of work in 1960. The commission applied three tests to decide if a community should form part of Greater London: how strong is the area as an independent centre in its own right; how strong are its ties to London; and how strongly is it drawn outwards towards the country rather than inwards towards London.

=== Greater London is created ===
Greater London was created by the London Government Act 1963, which came into force on 1 April 1965, replacing the administrative counties of Middlesex and London, including the City of London, where the London County Council had limited powers, and absorbing parts of Essex, Hertfordshire, Kent and Surrey. Greater London originally had a two-tier system of local government, with the Greater London Council (GLC) sharing power with the City of London Corporation (governing the small City of London) and the 32 London Borough councils. The GLC was abolished in 1986 by the Local Government Act 1985. Its functions were devolved to the City Corporation and the London Boroughs, with some functions transferred to central government and joint boards. Greater London formed the London region in 1994.

=== Greater London Authority ===
Arms of the Greater London Authority. The same arms were used by the Greater London Council.

The 1998 London referendum established a public will to recreate an upper tier of government to cover the region. The Greater London Authority, London Assembly and the directly elected Mayor of London were created in 2000 by the Greater London Authority Act 1999. In 2000, the outer boundary of the Metropolitan Police District was re-aligned to the Greater London boundary. The 2000 and 2004 mayoral elections were won by Ken Livingstone, who had been the final leader of the GLC. The 2008 and 2012 elections were won by Boris Johnson. The 2016, 2021 and 2024 elections were won by Sadiq Khan. London was covered by a single Parliamentary constituency in the European Parliament before Brexit.

== Geography ==
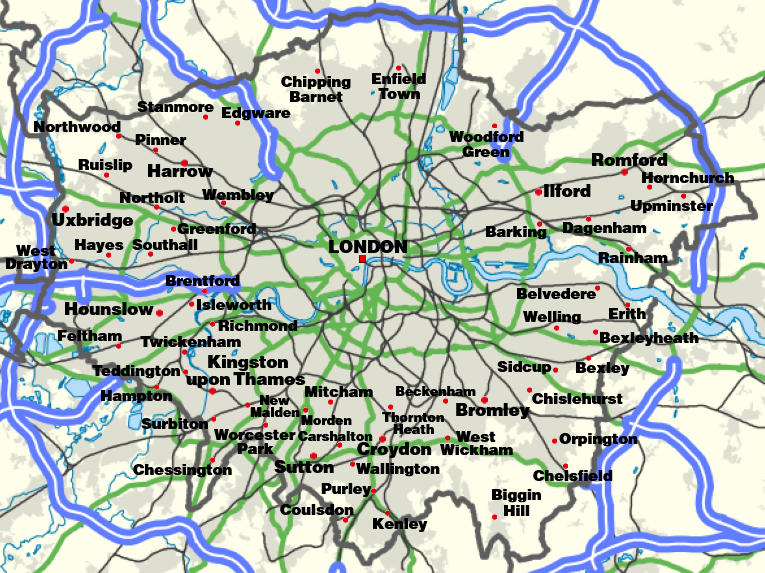
Map of Greater London showing railway lines, primary roads, motorways, and suburban towns

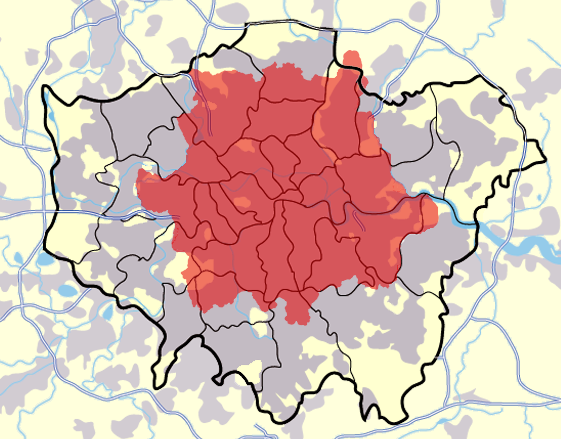
The London postal district in red in contrast to Greater London

Greater London includes the most closely associated parts of the Greater London Urban Area and their historic buffers and includes, in five boroughs, significant parts of the Metropolitan Green Belt which protects designated greenfield land in a similar way to the city's parks. The closest and furthest boundaries are with Essex to the northeast between Sewardstonebury next to Epping Forest and Chingford and with the Mar Dyke between Bulphan and North Ockendon. Greater London is also bounded by Hertfordshire to the north, Berkshire and Buckinghamshire to the west, Kent to the southeast and Surrey to the south and southwest. The highest point is Westerham Heights, in the North Downs and on the boundary with Kent, at 245 m (804 ft). Central government has implemented small boundary changes. The greatest were the 1969 transfers of Farleigh to Surrey and Knockholt to Kent. Others have included exchange of two Thames islands with Surrey and adjustments during the 1990s to parts of the boundaries of three boroughs near the M25. The only part of Greater London outside the motorway is North Ockendon, the furthest land unit from its centre. The majority of Greater London forms the London Low Emission Zone (LEZ) and the Ultra Low Emission Zone (ULEZ).

The London postal district does not cover all of Greater London.

== Governance ==
=== Greater London Authority ===
Greater London is under the strategic local governance of the Greater London Authority (GLA). It consists of an elected assembly, the London Assembly, and an executive head, the Mayor of London.

The current Mayor (not to be confused with the Lord Mayor of London) is Sadiq Khan. He is scrutinised by the elected London Assembly, which may amend his annual budget (by two-thirds majority) but otherwise lacks the power to block his directives. The headquarters of the GLA, previously at City Hall in Southwark, moved to The Crystal in Newham in January 2022. The Mayor is responsible for Greater London's strategic planning and is required to produce or amend the London Plan each electoral cycle.

=== UK Parliament ===
London is divided into 73 Parliamentary borough constituencies, formed from the combined area of several wards from one or more boroughs. Typically a borough is covered by two or three constituencies.

=== Status ===
The London Region does not have city status granted by the Crown. The Cities of London and Westminster within it have received formal city status. (Note: Croydon and Southwark have made several failed applications for city status.) Despite this, Greater London is commonly regarded as a city in the general senses of a conurbation and a municipality. A Lord Lieutenant of Greater London is appointed for its area, excluding the City of London. For the purposes of the Lieutenancies Act 1997, this area is defined as a county.

The term "London" usually refers to region or to the conurbation, but not often to the ancient, tiny City of London. That small area is often referred to as "the City" or "the Square Mile" and it forms the main financial district. Archaically, the urbanised area of London was known as the Metropolis. In common usage, the terms "London" and "Greater London" are usually used interchangeably. Greater London is officially divided for some purposes, with varying definitions, into Inner London and Outer London. For some strategic planning purposes, it is divided into five sub-regions.

=== Local government ===
Greater London is divided into 32 London Boroughs, each governed by a London Borough council. The City of London has a unique government dating back to the 12th century and is separate from the county of Greater London, although is still part of the region served by the Greater London Authority.

All London Borough councils belong to the London Councils association. Three London Boroughs carry the honorific title of Royal Borough: Kensington and Chelsea, Kingston, and Greenwich. Within the City of London are the liberties of Middle Temple and Inner Temple.

Districts of the London Region (Greater London)

== Demography ==
2021 United Kingdom Census
Country of birth	Population	%
United Kingdom	5,223,986	59.4
India	322,644	3.7
Romania	175,991	2.0
Poland	149,397	1.7
Bangladesh	138,895	1.6
Pakistan	129,774	1.5
Italy	126,059	1.4
Nigeria	117,145	1.3
(Republic of Ireland) Ireland	96,566	1.1
Sri Lanka	80,379	0.9
France	77,715	0.9
Jamaica	75,676	0.9
Turkey	72,867	0.8
United States	71,127	0.8
Spain	68,114	0.8
Somalia	66,288	0.8
Ghana	65,905	0.7
Kenya	58,020	0.7
Portugal	56,963	0.6
China	56,116	0.6
Philippines	54,930	0.6
Germany	50,364	0.6
South Africa	47,964	0.5
Afghanistan	47,706	0.5
Lithuania	45,378	0.5
Iran	43,852	0.5
Australia	43,418	0.5
Hong Kong	33,760	0.4
Iraq	30,365	0.3
Canada	21,772	0.2

High resolution view from the top of Tolworth Tower in South West London over the sprawling suburban housing that is typical in some areas of Greater London

With increasing industrialisation, London's population grew rapidly throughout the 19th and early 20th centuries, and it was the most populated city in the world until overtaken by New York in 1925. Its population peaked at 8,615,245 in 1939. There were an estimated 7,753,600 official residents in mid-2009.

London's wider metropolitan area has a population of between 12 and 13 million depending on the definition of that area. According to Eurostat, London has been the most populous city and metropolitan area of the European Union.

The region covers an area of 1,579 square kilometres. The population density is 4,761 people per square kilometre, more than ten times that of any other British region. In terms of population, London is the 25th largest city and the 17th largest metropolitan region in the world. It is ranked 4th in the world in the number of US dollar billionaires residing in the city. It ranks as one of the most expensive cities in the world, alongside Tokyo and Moscow.

=== Ethnic groups ===
In the 2001 UK Census, 71.15% of the population classed their ethnic group as White, including White British (59.79%), White Irish (3.07%) or "Other White" (8.29%, mostly Greek-Cypriot, Italian, Polish and Portuguese). 12.09% classed themselves as British Asian, including Indian, Pakistani, Bangladeshi and "Other Asian" (mostly Sri Lankan, Arab and other Southern Asian ethnicities). 10.91% classed themselves as Black British (around 6% as Black African, 4% as Black Caribbean, 0.84% as "Other Black"). 3.15% were of mixed race; 1.12% as Chinese; and 1.58% as other (mostly Filipino, Japanese, Korean, Vietnamese and other "British Orientals"). 21.8% of inhabitants were born outside the European Union. Irish people, from both the Republic of Ireland and Northern Ireland, number about 200,000, as do the Scots and Welsh combined.

In January 2005, a survey of London's ethnic and religious diversity claimed that there were more than 300 languages spoken and more than 50 non-indigenous communities with a population of more than 10,000. Figures from the Office for National Statistics show that in 2006 London's foreign-born population was 2,288,000 (31%), up from 1,630,000 in 1997. The 2001 UK Census showed that 27.1% of the population were born outside the UK, and a slightly higher proportion were classed as Non-White.

In the 2011 UK Census, 59.79% of the population classed their ethnic group as White, including White British (44.89%), White Irish (2.15%) or "Other White" (12.65%, mostly Greek-Cypriot, Italian, Polish, Spanish, Colombians and Portuguese). 18.49% classed themselves as British Asian, including Indian, Pakistani, Bangladeshi and "Other Asian" (mostly Sri Lankan, Arab and other Southern Asian ethnicities). 13.32% classed themselves as Black British (7% as Black African, 4.22% as Black Caribbean, 2.08% as "Other Black"). 4.96% were of mixed race; and 3.44% as other (mostly Filipino, Japanese, Korean, Vietnamese and other "British Orientals").

The table shows the top 21 countries of birth of residents in 2011. These figures do not give a fair indication of the total population of the specific ethnic groups associated with each country. For example, Londoners of Greek origin (from both Greece and Cyprus) number 300,000, since an organised Greek community has been established for nearly two centuries. The same can be said for Italian and French Londoners whose communities have been here for centuries (the French Embassy estimates there are between 300,000 and 400,000 French citizens living in the UK, with "a huge majority of them living in London"). Though a Polish community has existed in London since the late-Middle Ages, it was not significant in the 2001 Census but has grown significantly since 2004, when Poland joined the European Union and by June 2010; London had 122,000 Polish residents. The German-born population figure may be misleading, however, because it includes British nationals born to parents serving in the British armed forces in Germany.

London has been a focus for immigration for centuries, whether as a place of safety or for economic reasons. Huguenots, Eastern European Jews, Cypriots and East African Asians are examples of the former; Irish, Bangladeshis and West Indians of the latter. The East End district around Spitalfields has been first home for several ethnic groups, which have subsequently moved elsewhere in London as they gained prosperity.

Ethnic group	2001		2011		2021	
Ethnic group	Number	%	Number	%	Number	%
White: British	4,287,861	59.79%	3,669,284	44.89%	3,239,281	36.81%
White: Irish	220,488	3.07%	175,974	2.15%	156,333	1.78%
White: Gypsy or Irish Traveller (Note: New category created for the 2011 census.)	—N/a		8,196	0.10%	7,031	0.08%
White: Roma (Note: New category created for the 2021 census.)	—N/a				37,689	0.43%
White: Other	594,854	8.29%	1,033,981	12.65%	1,290,838	14.67%
White: subtotal	5,103,203	71.15%	4,887,435	59.79%	4,731,172	53.76%
Asian or Asian British: Indian	436,993	6.09%	542,857	6.64%	656,272	7.46%
Asian or Asian British: Pakistani	142,749	1.99%	223,797	2.74%	290,549	3.30%
Asian or Asian British: Bangladeshi	153,893	2.15%	222,127	2.72%	322,054	3.66%
Asian or Asian British: Chinese (Note: In 2001, listed under the 'Other ethnic group' heading.)	80,201	1.12%	124,250	1.52%	147,520	1.68%
Asian or Asian British: Other Asian	133,058	1.86%	398,515	4.88%	401,245	4.56%
Asian or Asian British: subtotal	946,894	13.20%	1,511,546	18.49%	1,817,640	20.66%
Black or Black British: African	378,933	5.28%	573,931	7.02%	697,054	7.92%
Black or Black British: Caribbean	343,567	4.79%	344,597	4.22%	345,405	3.93%
Black or Black British: Other Black	60,349	0.84%	170,112	2.08%	145,911	1.66%
Black or Black British: subtotal	782,849	10.92%	1,088,640	13.32%	1,188,370	13.50%
Mixed: White and Black Caribbean	70,928	0.99%	119,425	1.46%	132,555	1.51%
Mixed: White and Black African	34,182	0.48%	65,479	0.80%	77,341	0.88%
Mixed: White and Asian	59,944	0.84%	101,500	1.24%	125,188	1.42%
Mixed: Other Mixed	61,057	0.85%	118,875	1.45%	170,691	1.94%
Mixed: subtotal	226,111	3.15%	405,279	4.96%	505,775	5.75%
Other: Arab	—N/a		106,020	1.30%	139,791	1.59%
Other: Any other ethnic group	113,034	1.58%	175,021	2.14%	416,977	4.74%
Other: subtotal	113,034	1.58%	281,041	3.44%	556,768	6.33%
Total	7,172,091	100.00%	8,173,941	100.00%	8,799,725	100.00%

=== Population ===
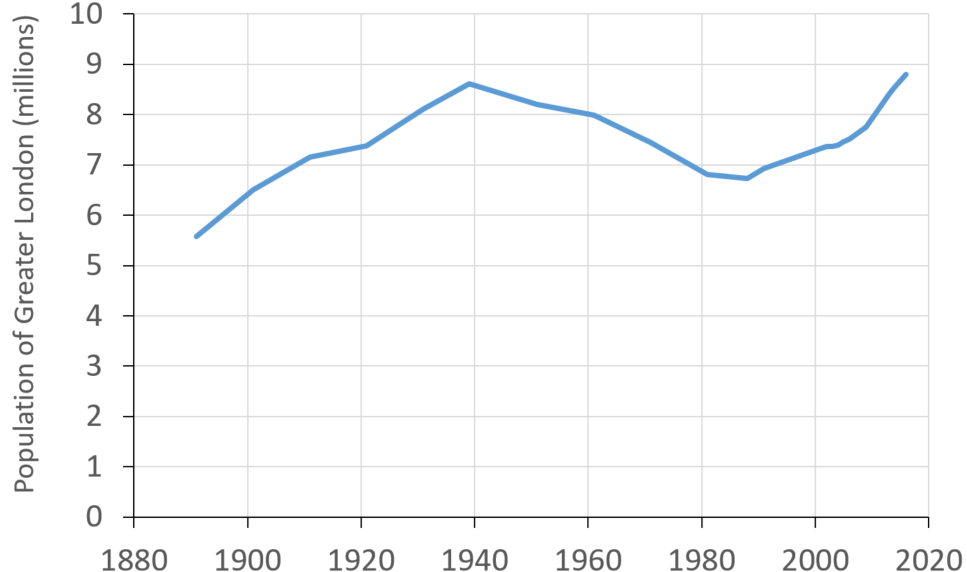
Greater London population from 1880 to 2016

The population of the current area of Greater London rose from about 1.1 million in 1801 (when only about 850,000 people were in the urban area, while 250,000 were living in villages and towns not yet part of London) to an estimated 8.6 million in 1939, but declined to 6.7 million in 1988, before starting to rebound in the 1990s.

By 2006, the population had recovered to the level of 1970 (and the level of population in the 1920s). It has now surpassed the previous 1939 peak, and is over 9 million.

Figures here are for Greater London in its 2001 boundaries. Figures before 1971 have been reconstructed by the Office for National Statistics based on past censuses to fit the 2001 boundaries. Figures from 1981 onward are mid-year estimates (revised in August 2007), which are more accurate than the censuses, known to underestimate the population of London.

1891	5–6 April	5,572,012
1901	31 March – 1 April	6,506,954
1911	2–3 April	7,160,525
1921	19–20 June	7,386,848
1931	26–27 April	8,110,480
1939	Mid-year estimate	8,615,245
1951	8–9 April	8,196,978
1961	23–24 April	7,992,616
1965	Greater London formally created	
1971	25–26 April	7,452,520
1981	Mid-year estimate	6,805,000
1988	Mid-year estimate	6,729,300
1991	Mid-year estimate	6,829,300
2001	Mid-year estimate	7,322,400
2002	Mid-year estimate	7,361,600
2003	Mid-year estimate	7,364,100
2004	Mid-year estimate	7,389,100
2005	Mid-year estimate	7,456,100
2006	Mid-year estimate	7,512,400
2009	Mid-year estimate	7,753,600
2013	Mid-year estimate	8,416,535
2014	Mid-year estimate	8,546,761
2015	Mid-year estimate	8,658,178
2016	Mid-year estimate	8,798,957

== Economy ==
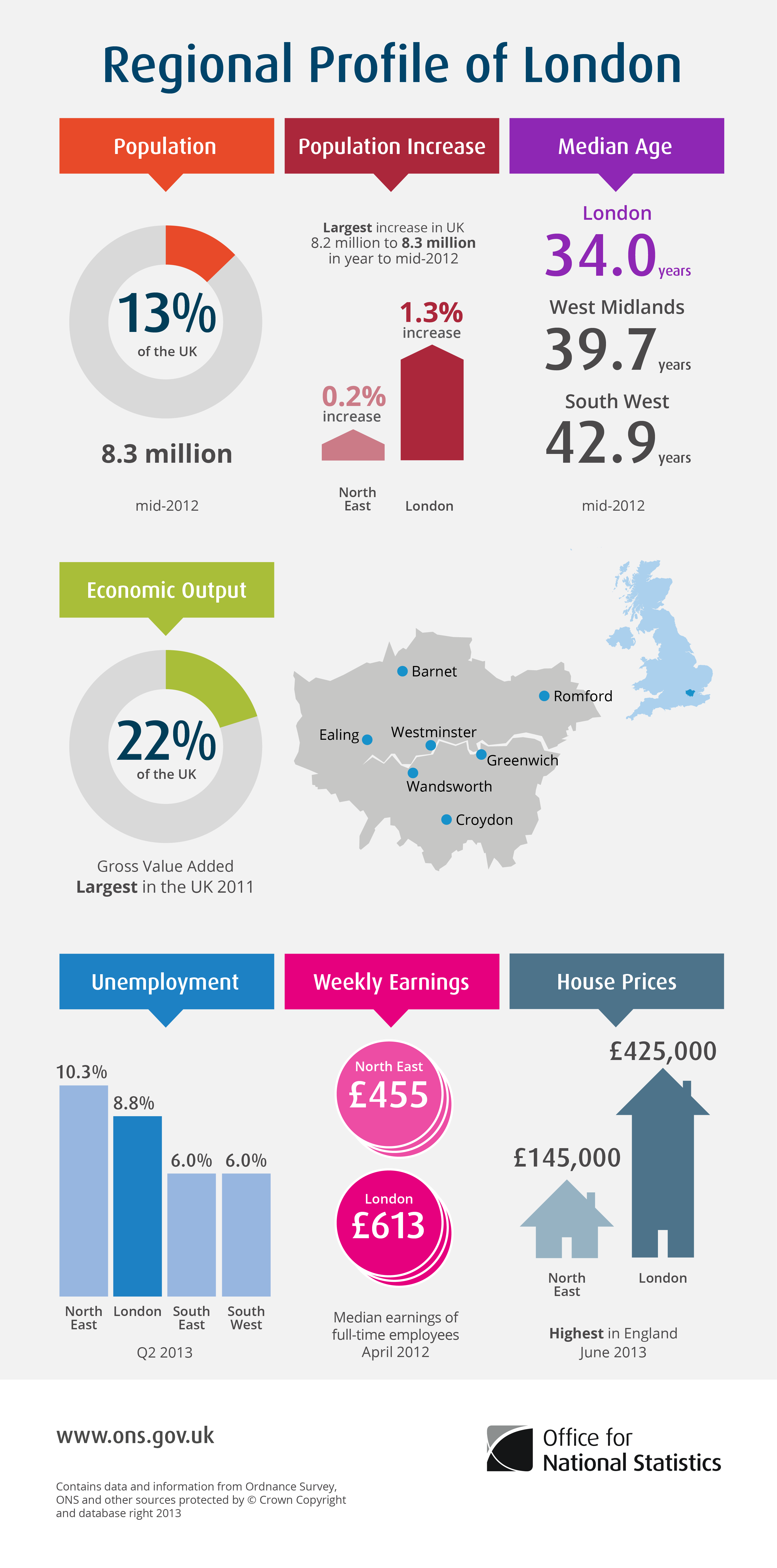
A profile of the economy of London in 2013

This is a chart of trend of regional gross value added (GVA) of Inner London at current basic prices published (pp. 240–253) by Office for National Statistics with figures in millions of British pounds sterling.

GVA: Inner London
Year	Regional Gross Value Added (Note: Components may not sum to totals due to rounding.)	Agriculture (Note: Includes hunting and forestry.)	Industry (Note: Includes energy and construction.)	Services (Note: Includes financial intermediation services indirectly measured.)
1995	64,616	7	8,147	56,461
2000	92,330	6	10,094	82,229
2003	112,090	12	10,154	101,924

Eurostat data shows the GDP of Inner London to be 232 billion euros in 2009 and per capita GDP of 78,000 euros.

This is a chart of trend of regional gross value added of Outer London at current basic prices published (pp. 240–253) by Office for National Statistics with figures in millions of British pounds sterling.

GVA: Outer London
Year	Regional Gross Value Added	Agriculture	Industry	Services
1995	44,160	51	10,801	33,307
2000	60,304	43	12,529	47,732
2003	69,420	69	13,081	54,462

Eurostat data shows the GDP of Outer London to be 103 billion euros in 2009 and per capita GDP of 21,460 euros.

== Religion ==
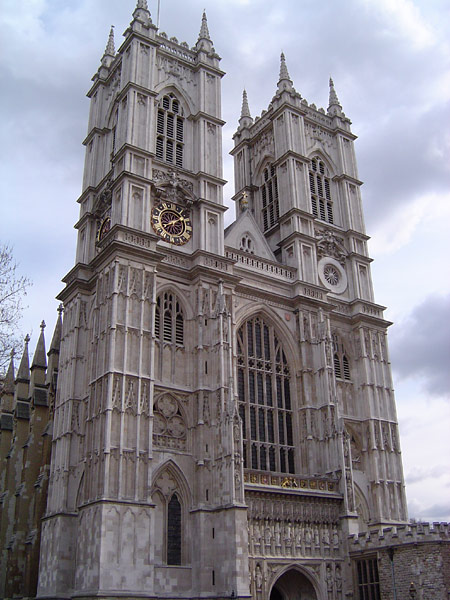
Westminster Abbey. A World Heritage Site and location of the coronation of British monarchs.

The largest religious groupings are Christian (48.4%), Muslim (8.4%), Hindu (8.0%), Jewish (1.8%), Sikh (1.5%), and Buddhist (1.0%), alongside those of no religion (21.7%). The United Kingdom has traditionally been Christian, and London has a large number of churches, particularly in the city. St Paul's Cathedral in the City and Southwark Cathedral south of the river are Anglican administrative centres, while the clerical head of the Church of England and the worldwide Anglican Communion, the Archbishop of Canterbury, has his main residence at Lambeth Palace in the London Borough of Lambeth.

Important national and royal ceremonies are shared between St Paul's and Westminster Abbey. The Abbey is not to be confused with nearby Westminster Cathedral, the largest Roman Catholic cathedral in England and Wales. Religious practice in London is lower than in any other part of the UK or Western Europe and is around seven times lower than American averages. Despite the prevalence of Anglican churches, weekly observance is low within that denomination, although in recent years church attendance, particularly at evangelical Anglican churches in London, has started to increase.

London is home to sizeable Hindu, Sikh, Buddhist, Muslim and Jewish communities. Many Muslims live in Tower Hamlets and Newham; the most important Muslim buildings are the East London Mosque in Whitechapel and the London Central Mosque on the edge of Regent's Park. London's large Hindu community is in the north-western boroughs of Harrow and Brent, the latter containing one of Europe's largest Hindu temples, BAPS Shri Swaminarayan Mandir London.

Sikh communities are in East and West London, particularly Southall in the western borough of Ealing, which is also home to the largest Sikh temple in the capital. The majority of British Jews live in London, with significant communities in Stamford Hill (the largest Hasidic community outside New York City and Israel), St John's Wood, Golders Green and Edgware. The Bevis Marks Synagogue (built 1701) in central London is Britain's oldest synagogue in continuous use.

== Education ==
Publicly funded education has been administered through 33 LEAs, which correspond to the City of London and the 32 London boroughs, since the 1990 enactment of the Education Reform Act 1988. From 1965 to 1990, 12 Inner London boroughs and the City of London were served by the Inner London Education Authority.

The introduction of comprehensive schools, directed by Circular 10/65 in 1965, was mostly followed in Greater London; however, 19 grammar schools have been retained in some Outer London boroughs, with Sutton having the most with five, followed by Bexley with four and others in five other boroughs. In these boroughs the state schools outperform the (relatively few) independent schools. In inner London, private schools always get the best results and are larger in number. At GCSE and A level, Outer London boroughs have broadly better results than Inner London boroughs.

At GCSE, the best borough is Kingston upon Thames, closely followed by Sutton. Both boroughs have selective schools, and get the top two average GCSE results in England for LEAs. Next is Kensington and Chelsea, the third best in England, then Redbridge, Hammersmith and Fulham, Bromley, Barnet and Harrow. Only ten boroughs have GCSE results under the England average, and some inner-London boroughs have surprisingly good results considering where they lie on the scale of deprivation, e.g. Lambeth. Overall at GCSE in 2009, Greater London had the best results for regions of England. Greater London is generally a prosperous region, and prosperous areas generally have good GCSE results. The City of London has no state schools, just two independent schools. Haringey and Kensington and Chelsea have the most people that pass no GCSEs.

At A-level, the average results for LEAs are disappointing compared to their good GCSE results. Although Kingston upon Thames gets the best GCSE results in England, at A-level it is not even above average. Sutton gets the best A-level results in London and in England. Three of the schools in the top four at A-level in London are in Sutton. It has only one independent school. The few other boroughs with above-average A-level results are Havering, Barnet, Bexley, Redbridge, and Ealing. The poor A-level results in many London boroughs is explained by the quantity of independent schools getting good A-level results. The state school system is often bypassed at age 16 by the more able pupils. Some London boroughs need more good sixth form colleges.

The region's 34 further education colleges are funded through the Skills Funding Agency and the Young People's Learning Agency. Large colleges include Kingston College, Havering College of Further and Higher Education, and Croydon College.

=== Universities ===
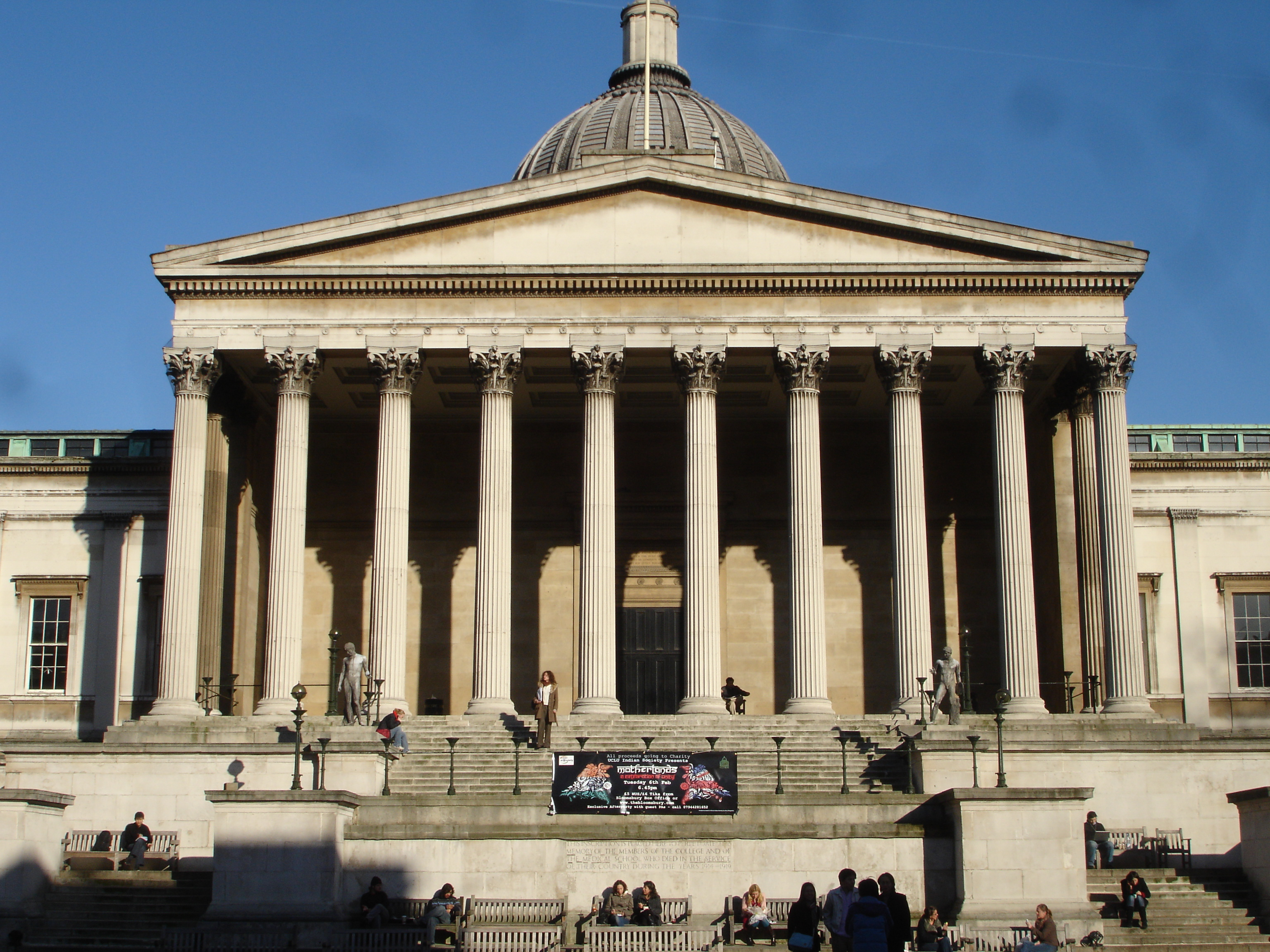
University College London, a founding constituent of the University of London

The University of London has 20 federated colleges and schools. The two main constituents of the University of London are (in order of total funding) University College London (UCL) and King's College London (KCL). Imperial College was part of the University of London until 2007, and is now an independent university. UCL, KCL and Imperial have very large research grants – some of the largest in England after Cambridge and Oxford, UCL and Imperial receive around £600 million each which is more than twice as much as any other in the region. The next largest institution by funding is Queen Mary University of London, followed by City, University of London. London is also home to the London School of Economics and Political Science (LSE), one of the few solely social science institutions in the world. Together with UCL and Imperial, they make up the London vertex of the Golden Triangle universities, the other institutions being Oxford and Cambridge. The region has many medical schools although these are part of other institutions such as UCL, KCL and Imperial. The Royal Veterinary College is based in Camden (with another site in North Mymms in Hertfordshire).

50% of students come from the region, and around 30% from other regions. Most students from other regions come from South East England, the East of England, and, to a lesser degree, South West England; the vast majority are from the south of England. Over 50% students native to the region stay in the region, with 15% going to South East England, 30% to either Scotland, Wales or the North East and around 5% go elsewhere. London is a draw for UK graduates from all over the UK.

Over 70% of UK students to graduate from the University of London remain in London; just under 15% go to the South-East, and just over 5% go to the East of England and 10% elsewhere.

== Twin cities ==
The GLA has twin and sister city agreements with the following cities.

Country		City	Region	Year
(China)	China	Shanghai	Shanghai Municipality	2009
(China)	China	Beijing	Beijing Municipality	2006
(France)	France	Paris	Île-de-France	2001
(Germany)	Germany	Berlin	Berlin	2000
(Russia)	Russia	Moscow	Russian federal city	2002
(United States)	United States	New York City	New York	2001
(Japan)	Japan	Tokyo	Tokyo	2005
(Croatia)	Croatia	Zagreb	City of Zagreb	2009
(India)	India	Mumbai	Maharashtra	

== See also ==
Geographical

- Central London
- Inner London
- Outer London
- London boroughs
- Greater London Urban Area
- London commuter belt
- Metropolitan Police District
- M25 motorway

Political

- Mayor of London
- List of Lord Lieutenants of Greater London
- List of High Sheriffs of Greater London
- London Plan
- City of London

Historical

- Metropolitan Board of Works
- County of London
- Greater London Council

Others

- Global city
- Megacity
- Metropolis
