= Economy of London =

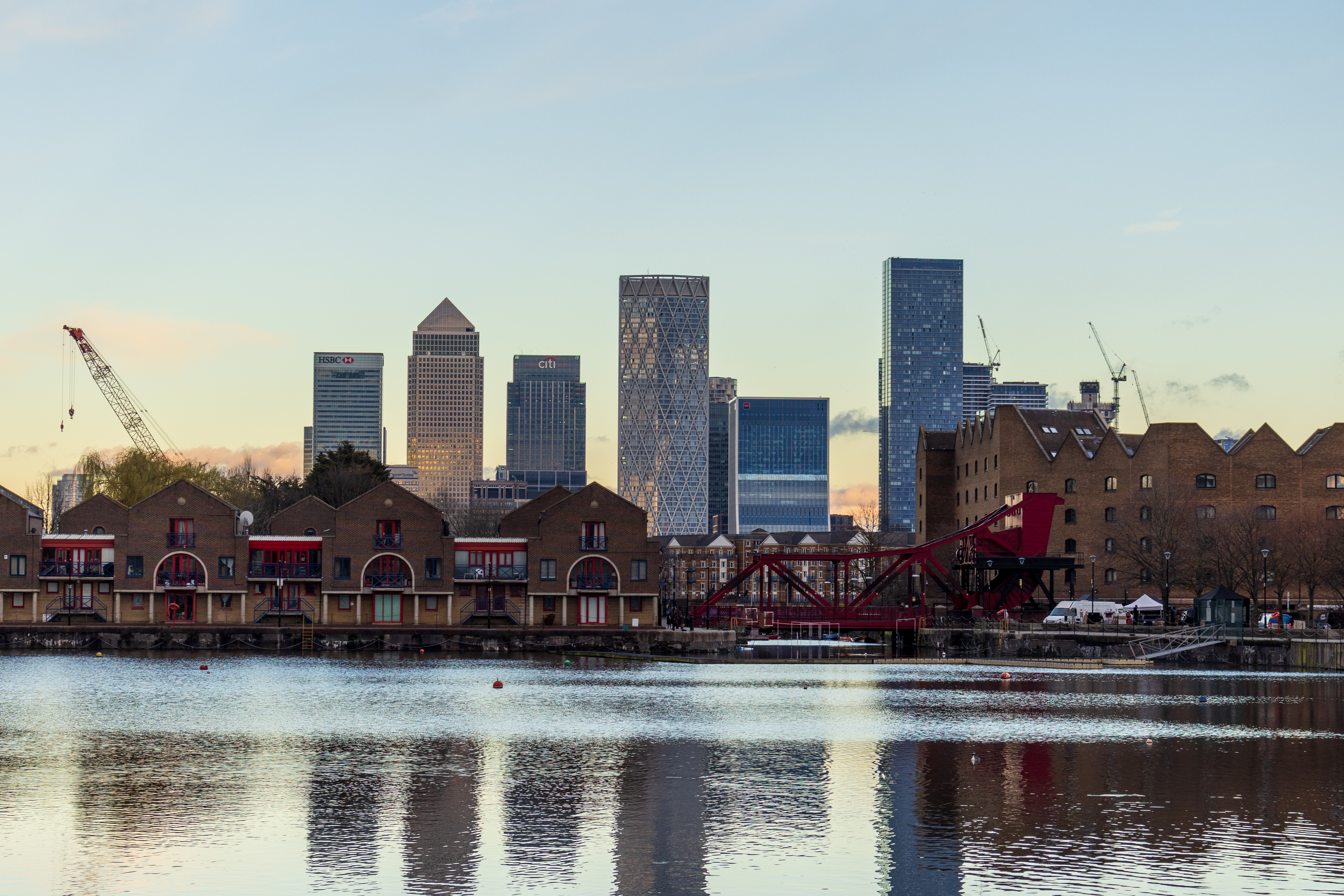
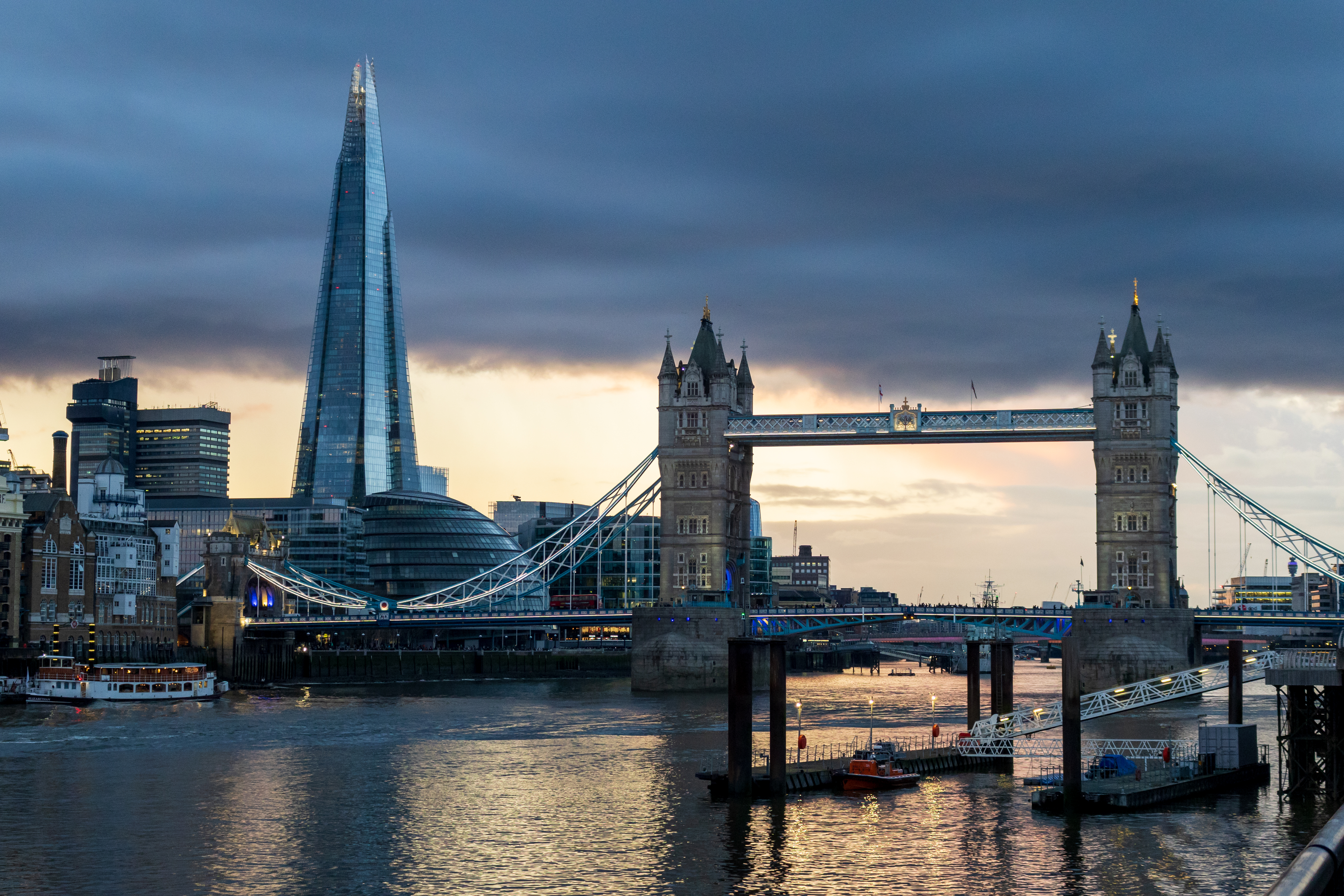
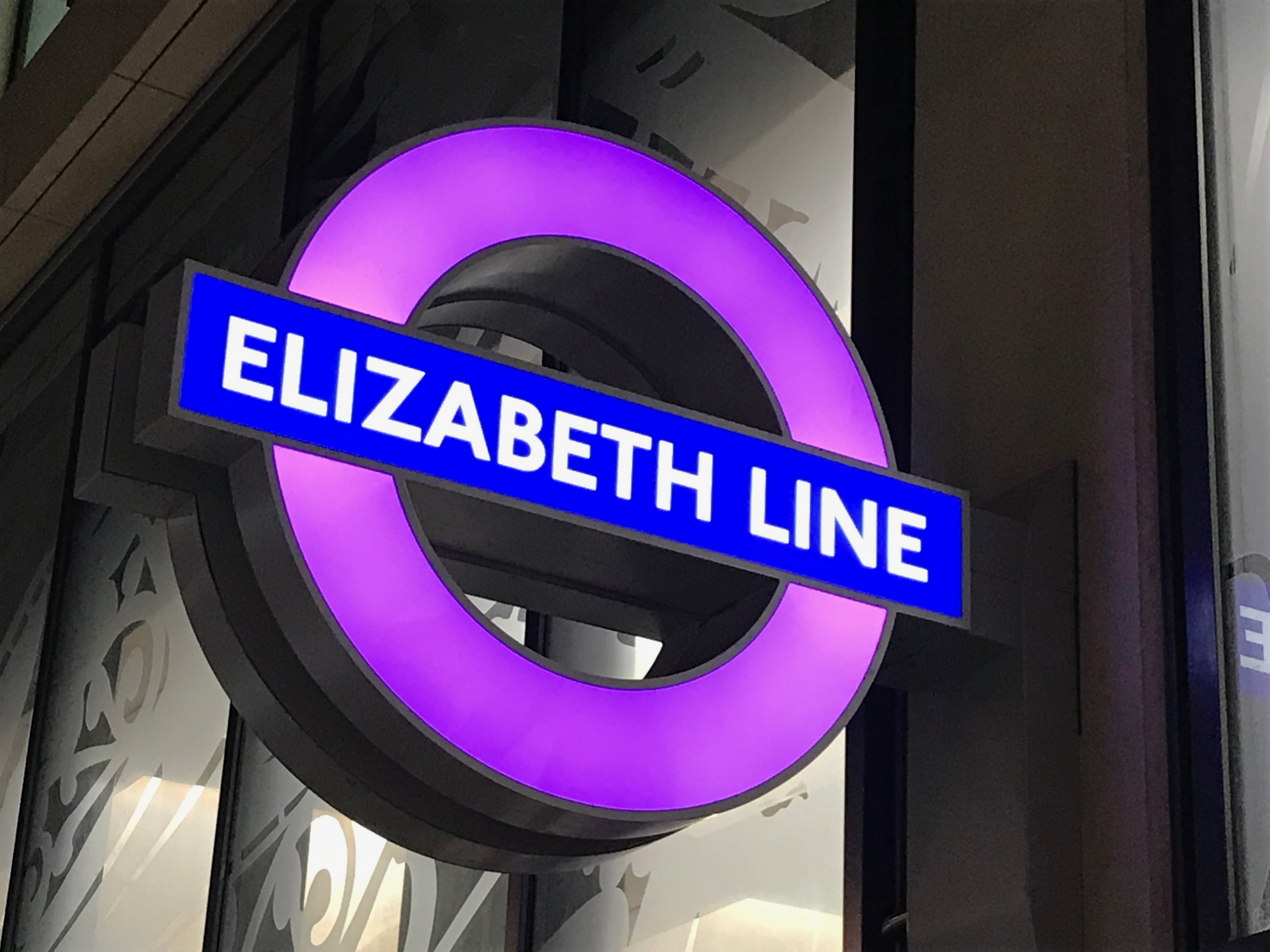
- London is the largest urban economy in Europe and, alongside New York, the city in the world most integrated with the global economy.

Statistics
- Population: 9,122,909 (2025)
- GDP: £617.915 billion (2023)
- GDP per capita: £69,077 (2023)
- Labour force: 4,726,000 / 74.4% in employment (Jan–Mar 2024) (Note: In employment and aged 16 or over (quantity) or aged 16–64 (percent))
- Labour force by occupation: List: 33.2% Professional; 16.9% Associate professional; 13.1% Managers, directors and senior officials; 8.9% Administrative and secretarial; 6.6% Elementary occupations; 6.5% Caring, leisure and other service; 6.0% Skilled trades; 5.5% Sales and customer service; 3.2% Process plant and machine operatives; (Jan–Dec 2023) (Note: Percent is a proportion of all persons in employment aged 16 and over.)
- Unemployment: 228,000 / 4.6% (Jan–Mar 2024) (Note: Unemployed aged 16 and over. Percent is a proportion of economically active.)
- Average gross salary: £902.7 per week (2025) (Note: Median gross weekly pay for full time employees resident in London)

External
- Exports: £190.0 billion (2021) (Note: Goods and services)
- Export goods: £37.8 billion (2021) (Note: Excluding services)
- Imports: £138.5 billion (2021)
- Import goods: £62.6 billion (2021)

The economy of London is dominated by service industries, particularly financial services and associated professional services, which have strong links with the economy in other parts of the United Kingdom (UK) and internationally. In addition to being the capital city of the United Kingdom, London is one of the world's leading financial centres for international business and commerce and is one of the "command centres" for the global economy.

London is the most populous region, urban zone and metropolitan area in the United Kingdom. London had the fifth largest metropolitan economy in the world in 2011 according to the Brookings Institution. In 2024, GDP per capita of the City of London was £7.33 million (US$10.04 million) or the largest in the world. The London fiscal surplus, £32.5 billion in 2016–17, mostly goes towards funding services in other parts of the UK.

London accounts for approximately 22 per cent of the UK's economic output. 841,000 private sector businesses were based in London at the start of 2013, more than in any other region or country in the UK. 18 per cent are in the professional, scientific and technical activities sector while 15 per cent are in the construction sector. Many of these are small and medium-sized enterprises.

== Gross value added (GVA) ==
In 2023, London had GVA of £577.14 billion (US$790.6 billion) and £64,519 (US$88,382.19) per capita.

=== GVA by borough ===
Borough	GVA (bil. £)	GVA per head (£)
Westminster and City of London	204.021	906,879
Tower Hamlets	44.834	136,427
Camden	40.213	182,041
Haringey and Islington	31.141	64,409
Lewisham and Southwark	30.375	49,452
Kensington and Chelsea and Hammersmith and Fulham	25.277	75,761
Hounslow and Richmond upon Thames	23.966	48,879
Hackney and Newham	21.892	34,980
Harrow and Hillingdon	19.731	33,875
Merton and Kingston upon Thames	17.079	28,618
Lambeth	15.388	47,740
Bexley and Greenwich	13.038	23,924
Croydon	11.757	29,560
Barking & Dagenham and Havering	11.365	23,173
Redbridge and Waltham Forest	11.066	18,776
Barnet	10.639	26,934
Brent	10.087	29,279
Ealing	9.795	26,096
Wandsworth	8.693	26,226
Enfield	8.499	25,957
Bromley	8.287	25,023
London	577.141	64,519

== Service industries ==
London shifted to a mostly service-based economy earlier than other European cities, particularly following the Second World War. A number of factors contribute to London's success as a service industry and business centre:

- English being the native language and the dominant international language of business;
- its past role as the capital of the former British Empire;
- its position in Europe, since Europe has a population larger than that of the US, and a central time zone that allows London to act as a bridge between US and Asian markets;
- the Special Relationship between the United Kingdom and United States, and the United Kingdom's close relationships with many countries in Asia, Africa and the Middle East, particularly those in the Commonwealth of Nations;
- English contract law being the most important and most used contract law in international business;
- a business friendly environment (for example, relatively low taxes for corporations and non-domiciled foreign individuals; and, in the City of London, the local government is not elected by the resident population but instead by resident businesses – the City of London is a business democracy);
- good transport infrastructure particularly its aviation industry;
- a high quality of life.

Currently, over 85% (3.2 million) of the employed population of Greater London works in the service industries. Another half a million employees resident in Greater London work in manufacturing and construction, almost equally divided between the two.

=== Business districts ===
London has five major business districts: the City, Westminster, Canary Wharf, Camden & Islington and Lambeth & Southwark. One way to get an idea of their relative importance is to look at relative amounts of office space: Greater London had 26,721,000 m^{2} of office space in 2001.

Business district	Office space (m^{2})	Business concentration
The City	7,740,000	Finance, broking, insurance, legal, fund managers, banking
Westminster	5,780,000	Head offices, real estate, private banking, hedge funds, government
Camden & Islington	2,294,000	Creative industries, finance, design, art, fashion, architecture, media
Canary Wharf	2,120,000	Banking, media, legal
Lambeth & Southwark	1,780,000	Accountancy, consultancy, local government

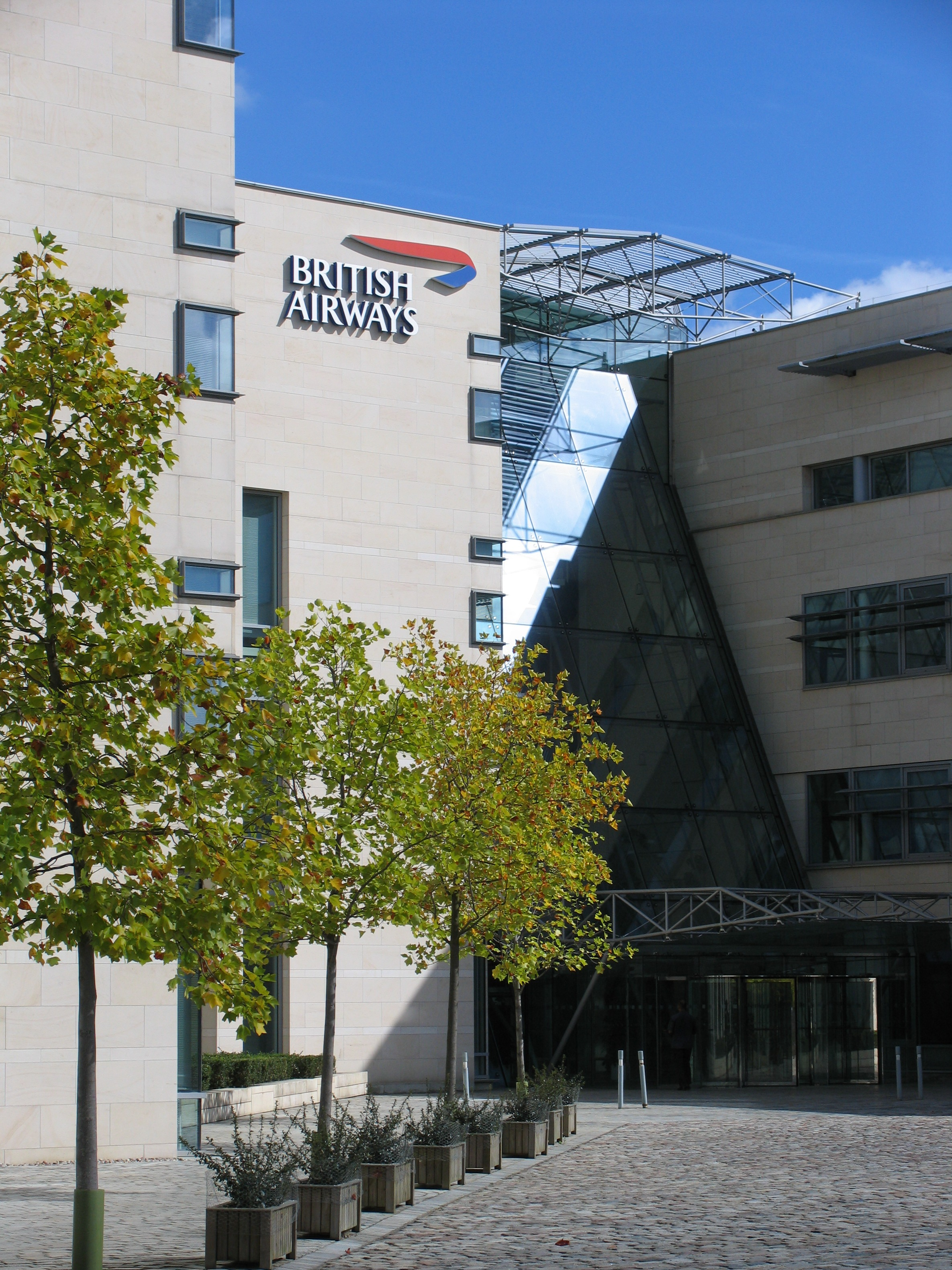
Waterside, the headquarters of British Airways in the Borough of Hillingdon

A useful guide to the distribution of wealth across London is the cost of renting office space. Mayfair and St. James's are historically and currently the most expensive areas – approximately £146 per sq ft per annum. The least expensive commercial districts are Waterloo & Southwark and East London Tech City, a new, but growing hub of start up technology companies, also known as Silicon Roundabout – approximately £65 per sq ft per annum.

=== Domestic and international corporate headquarters ===
The London Stock Exchange is the most international stock exchange and the largest in Europe. More than half of the London Stock Exchange top 100 listed companies (the FTSE 100) and over 100 of Europe's 500 largest companies are headquartered in central London. Over 70% of the FTSE 100 are located within London's metropolitan area, and 75% of Fortune 500 companies have offices in London. According to research by Deloitte, "London has the most internationally diverse executive community in the world, attracting business leaders from 95 nationalities and with alumni working in 134 countries".

=== Financial services ===
London's largest industry remains finance. It is the largest financial exporter in the world, and makes a significant contribution to the UK's balance of payments. In the 2017 Global Financial Centres Index, London was ranked as having the most competitive financial center in the world. However, in the 2018 ranking, London had lost that title to New York City. In the same ranking for 2020, London came second after New York City (with cities such as Shanghai, Tokyo, Hong Kong, Singapore, Beijing, San Francisco, Shenzhen and Zurich in the top 10). The City of London is home to exchanges, banks, brokers, investment managers, pension funds, hedge funds, private equity firms, insurance companies and reinsurance markets. London is notable as a centre of international finance where foreign participants in financial markets come to deal with one another. It is also home to the Bank of England, the second oldest central bank in the world, and the European Banking Authority, although the latter was moving to Paris in March 2019 following the Brexit referendum of 2016. Other key institutions are Lloyd's of London for insurance and the Baltic Exchange for shipping.

A second financial district has developed at Canary Wharf to the east of the City, which includes the global headquarters of two of the world's largest banks, HSBC and Barclays, the rest-of-the-world headquarters of Citigroup and the headquarters of the global news service Reuters. London handled 36.7% of global currency transactions in 2009 – an average daily turnover of US$1.85 trillion – with more US dollars traded in London than in New York, and more euros traded than in every other city in Europe combined. London is the leading centre for international bank lending, derivatives markets, money markets, international insurance, trading in gold, silver and base metals through the London bullion market and London Metal Exchange, and issuance of international debt securities.

Financial services in London benefited from the UK's membership of the European Union (EU), although there were concerns following the decision of the United Kingdom to leave the EU. However, Britain’s exit from the EU in early 2021 (Brexit) only marginally weakened London's position as an international financial center (IFC).

The combination of lax regulation and London's financial institutions providing sophisticated methods to launder proceeds from criminal activity around the world, including those from the drug trade, makes the City a global hub for illicit finance and London a safe haven for the world's malfeasants, according to research papers and reports published in the mid-2010s.

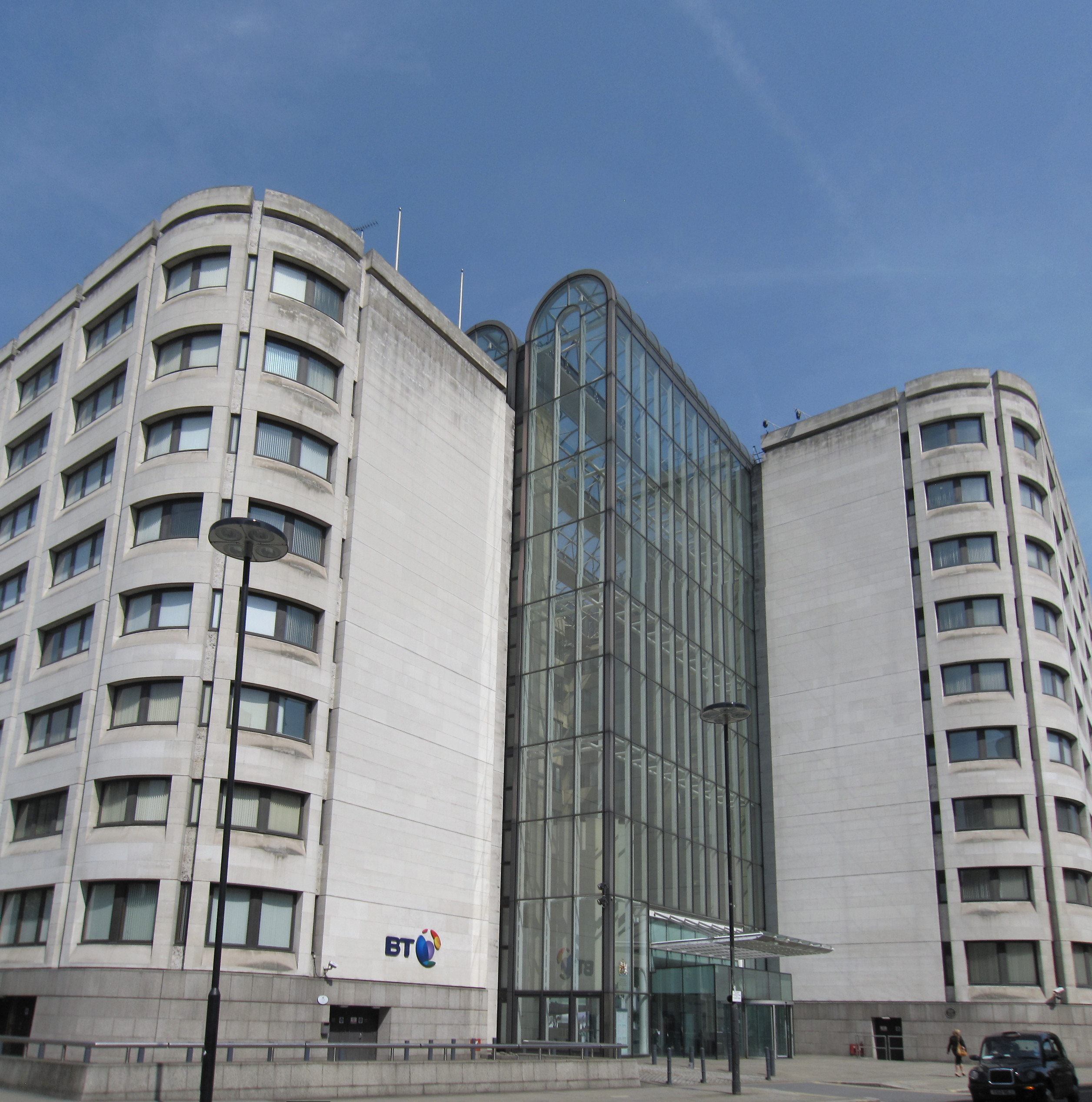
BT Centre, the headquarters of BT Group, in the City of London

=== Professional services ===
London is a leading global centre for professional services. Many different types of professional service providers are located in the city including the big four accountants and major management consulting firms. London is the headquarters for four of the world's six largest law firms and is a leading international centre for legal services.

=== Media ===
Media companies are concentrated in London, and the media distribution industry is London's second most competitive sector. The BBC is a key employer, and other broadcasters also have headquarters around the city. Many national newspapers are edited in London: historically in Fleet Street in the City, but now dispersed across the capital. Soho is the centre of London's post-production industry. Hollywood's links with the United Kingdom are centred on London, and contribute billions to the economy.

=== Tourism ===
Tourism is one of London's prime industries. London is the most visited city in the world by international tourists with 18.8 million international visitors forecast in 2015, ahead of Bangkok (18.2 million) and Paris (16.1 million). Within the UK, London is home to the ten most-visited tourist attractions. Tourism employed the equivalent of 350,000 full-time workers in London in 2003, whilst annual expenditure by tourists is around £15bn.

=== Technology ===
A growing number of technology companies are based in London, notably in East London Tech City, also known as Silicon Roundabout. Investment in London's technology sector was $2.28 billion in 2015, 69 per cent higher than the $1.3 billion raised in 2014. Since 2010, London-based technology companies have collectively raised $5.2 billion of venture capital funding. A report by Ernst & Young highlighted the importance of London to the UK's FinTech industry in terms of availability of expertise and demand for services. London has also been named as the fastest growing technology hub in Europe, having over 100 unique tech companies with a value of $1 billion or more.

=== Retail ===
London is a major retail centre, and in 2010 had the highest non-food retail sales of any city in the world, with a total spend of around £64.2 billion. The UK's fashion industry, centred on London, contributes tens of billions to the economy.

== Manufacturing and construction ==
For the 19th and much of the 20th centuries London was a major manufacturing centre, with over 1.5 million industrial workers in 1960. Manufacturing suffered dramatic decline from the 1960s on. Entire industries have been lost including shipbuilding (which ended in 1912 after hundreds of years with the closure of the Thames Ironworks and Shipbuilding Company), consumer electronics, aircraft manufacture and most of the vehicle construction industry. This trend continues, with the loss of the pharmaceutical manufacturing sites of Aesica (formerly Merck Sharp and Dohme) at Ponders End in 2011, and Sanofi-Aventis (originally May & Baker) at Dagenham by 2013. Pharmaceutical and biotechnology companies in the United Kingdom have a strong presence in London, including the world headquarters of GlaxoSmithKline.

=== Manufacturing ===
In 2016, over 100,000 people were employed in London's manufacturing sector. Most worked, and continue to work, in medium or small-sized businesses such as Charlie Bigham's ready-meal factory in Park Royal, Fox Umbrellas in Croydon or Kashket & Partners (military uniform tailors in the Lea Valley). However, almost certainly the largest manufacturer still operating in London is Ford UK, whose diesel engine manufacturing plant and vehicle operations hub in Dagenham employs around 2,000. Another household name is Brompton Bicycle Ltd who employs several hundred in Greenford, Ealing. There is also still some large-scale food and drink manufacturing. Examples include Coca-Cola factories in Edmonton and Sidcup, Warburtons bakery in Enfield, United Biscuits' factory in Harlesden, Fuller's Brewery in Chiswick, Nestlé's factory in Hayes (coffee and chocolate) and Tate & Lyle's refinery in Silvertown (sugar and syrup).

=== Construction ===
London was named the city with the best real estate investment opportunities for foreign investors in 2014. Office development was at a four-year high in 2013 with 9.7 million sq ft across 71 schemes under construction.

A multibillion-pound 10-year construction programme has begun in Nine Elms on the South Bank of the river Thames in central London. This will develop the area from a semi-derelict, light industrial zone into a modern residential and business district. The programme includes regeneration of Battersea Power Station, construction of new embassies for the United States and the Netherlands, and regeneration of New Covent Garden Market which is the largest fresh produce market in the UK. Transport improvement plans include two new Northern line tube stations, River Bus piers, new bus services and a network of cycle lanes and footpaths. A new bridge across the river Thames will link Nine Elms to Pimlico on the opposite bank. Around 25,000 permanent jobs will be created once the new buildings are occupied and around 16,000 new homes.

Other large construction projects include Kings Cross Central and Paddington Waterside. In 2014, the government identified 20 new housing zones across London, and in February 2015 the development of the first nine zones was approved, which will create 28,000 new homes by 2025 from £260m of investment.

== Education ==
London is a leading global educational centre, with one of the largest populations of overseas students of any city in the world. The federal University of London has over 120,000 students, making it the largest contact teaching university in the United Kingdom and one of the largest universities in Europe. It comprises 19 colleges and 12 institutes. The largest and most well-known University of London colleges include University College London, King's College London, Birkbeck, Queen Mary, the London School of Economics and Political Science, Royal Holloway, Goldsmiths, City, and the Institute of Education.

Imperial College London, King's College London, LSE, Barts and UCL are leading centres of research and stand alongside MIT, Berkeley, Princeton, Johns Hopkins, Columbia and other US universities in terms of international reputation.

Most of the leading learned societies of the world are based in London. The Royal Institution is a historic and important repository and proponent of the acquisition of scientific knowledge through research and study. London is Europe's leading centre for arts education.

== Transport ==
Transportation contributes to both the service and construction sectors of the London economy.

=== Public transport ===
London has an integrated public transport system operated by Transport for London under a single electronic ticketing system, the Oyster card. The city's network successfully provided transport for the 2012 Summer Olympics. It includes the London Underground, London Overground, Docklands Light Railway, London Buses and London River Services. A ring of 18 main-line railway stations provides train links to cities, towns and villages around the country as well as international services to Paris, Brussels and Amsterdam via the high-speed Eurostar.

Crossrail is a railway line running east to west through London and into the surrounding countryside, which opened in 2022. It runs on 118 km (73 mi) of track with a branch to Heathrow Airport. The main feature of the project is construction of 42 km (26 mi) of new tunnels connecting stations in central London including a branch to Canary Wharf in east London. It was Europe's biggest construction project with a £15 billion projected cost. An additional line, Crossrail 2, has been proposed.

=== Roads ===
Most of the streets of central London were laid out before cars were invented, and London's road network is often congested. There is a £16/day congestion charge in Central London. The Ultra Low Emission Zone (ULEZ) adds an extra charge of £12.50/day for vehicles which do not meet Euro 4 standards for petrol and Euro 6 for diesel (which corresponds to vehicles made before 2007 and 2015 respectively). The ULEZ charge will be extended to the North and South Circular from October 2021.

=== Airports ===
London is served by six international airports which are the world's busiest city airport system by passenger traffic. These are Heathrow, Gatwick, Stansted, Luton, London City, and Southend.

There are a number of proposals for expanding airport capacity for London including expansion of London Heathrow Airport and expansion of Gatwick Airport. The principal argument in favour of airport expansion is to support economic growth in the UK by providing an international hub for air-transport links to fast-growing developing countries around the world. The Heathrow proposal expects to create 120,000 new jobs across the UK and bring economic benefits of more than £100 billion. It also anticipates boosting exports as a result of the expansion.

=== Ports ===
Once the largest port in the world, the Port of London is today the second-largest in the United Kingdom, handling 48 million tonnes of cargo each year. The port is not located in one area – it stretches along the tidal Thames, including central London, with many individual wharfs, docks, terminals and facilities built incrementally over the centuries. As with many similar historic European ports the bulk of activities has steadily moved downstream towards the open sea, as ships have grown larger and other city uses take up land closer to the city's centre. Today, much of the Port of London cargo passes through the Port of Tilbury, outside the boundary of Greater London.

London Gateway, the UK's newest container port, opened in 2013. The £1.5bn facility at Thurrock, Essex, is 20 miles (32 km) down the River Thames from London. It is expected to be able to handle 3.5 million containers a year. The development is forecast to create 27,000 jobs in London and the South East and contribute £2.4bn a year to its economy.

== See also ==
- Agriculture in London
- Economy of Europe
- Economy of England
- Economy of the United Kingdom
- List of companies based in London
