= U.S. National Soccer Team Players Association =

USNSTPA

The U.S. National Soccer Team Players Association (USNSTPA) is the players union for the members of the United States men's national soccer team. Though the organization has existed since 1996, they rose to prominence within American soccer in late 2004 when their collective bargaining negotiations with the United States Soccer Federation (USSF) became public. At the time, the collective bargaining agreement had been expired for two years, and negotiations during that period hadn't resulted in a new agreement.

== History ==
According to various sources, either the players went on strike or were locked out of a December preliminary camp and later the January 2005 camp. In response, the USSF held a camp with replacement players. These players came from the United Soccer Leagues (USL) and Major Indoor Soccer League (MISL). Major League Soccer's players union (MLSPU) stood with the national team players, advising their membership not to accept invitations to the January camp. With World Cup Qualifying games at risk, the two sides agreed to an interim deal that would guarantee that the first choice players appeared through the qualifying campaign.

The two sides continued negotiations throughout the summer and into the fall of 2005, before finally reaching a deal in November 2005. That deal was approved by both parties in early December, running through 2010 and assuring that labor issues would not threaten World Cup participation.

The U.S. National Soccer Team Players Association is governed by a five-player board of representatives elected annually, and run by an executive director. The women's national team has a separate organization, the U.S. Women's National Soccer Team Players Association.

Aside from negotiating for the players, the USNSTPA owns USSoccerPlayers.com a large soccer-specific website. That site was formerly InternetSoccer.com — one of the major independent soccer sites to emerge in the late 1990s.

The USNSTPA is also heavily involved in fundraising for the Leukemia & Lymphoma Society through their own Time In program and the national Soccer Kicks for Cancer program.
