= Association of Member Nominated Trustees =

The Association of Member Nominated Trustees is an organisation established in September 2010 composed of pension trustees selected by employees or members of private and public sector pension funds in the United Kingdom. It is a non-profit group which seeks to organise employee representatives through sharing information, expertise and coordinating policies for pensions and corporations in which money is invested.

== Background ==
A member nominated trustee, in UK law, is a person appointed by employees, or members of an occupational pension plan, in accordance with the Pensions Act 2004 sections 241–242.

Member nominated trustees of pension plans have been a part of UK pensions since the emergence of occupational pension plans in the middle of the twentieth century. During the 1970s Labour government, a white paper was proposed that half the trustees should be nominated by the workforce, however this was not implemented. Instead, under the Pensions Act 1995, following the Goode Report, a rule was introduced, that companies could opt out of, that a third of trustees had to be nominated. In the Pensions Act 2004, this requirement was made compulsory, and the Secretary of State has the power to raise the threshold to one half. Many pension funds already have one half of trustees nominated even though the law requires less. Given the steady growth in numbers and the formalisation and establishment of member trustees in the economy, in September 2010, the AMNT emerged to organise member trustees. Its first official meeting took place on 31 March 2011, and it set a date in July to agree on policies and a constitution.

== See also ==
- UK labour law
- UK company law
- UK pensions
