= U.S. Women's National Team Players Association =

The U.S. Women's National Team Players Association (USWNTPA) is a labor union representing the United States women's national soccer team (USWNT). The organization's primary mission is to protect the rights of the USWNT and to safeguard the economic and social welfare of all of the women's national team players.

== History ==
In 2000, the Players Association was certified as the exclusive bargaining representative for the women's national soccer team. From its inception until the fall of 2014, the Players Association was headquartered in Philadelphia, Pennsylvania. During that time, the organization was represented in its interactions with the United States Soccer Federation (USSF) by its General Counsel and Executive Director, John B. Langel.

In November 2014, the association hired counsel Rich Nichols as their new executive director and moved their headquarters to Keller, Texas. Nichols worked on contract negotiations with the United States Soccer Federation (USSF) until December 2016. The following year in February, the Players Association announced the hiring of Becca Roux as their new interim executive director. Roux took over as the team prepared for new collective bargaining agreement talks with the USSF. As executive director, Roux works with the team to set the strategic vision for revenue generation and social impact by engaging the players' platform. She also works around efforts to close the gender pay equity gap.

On March 4, 2020, the Association announced that it had named Becky Sauerbrunn as its first president.

== Administration ==
The Players Association serves as the collective bargaining representative of all players on the women's national soccer team. It is governed by a constitution and by-laws, which were enacted on March 23, 2001. Under the Article IV of the Constitution and By-Laws, the Players Association is governed by three Players' Representatives and one Executive Director chosen by the members of the organization. The Article IV (e) states that the Executive Director "will be appointed by a majority of the Players Representatives and shall serve for a term to be agreed upon by a majority of the Players Representatives". Article (g) states that in the event that the "Players Representatives do not appoint an Executive Director, this function shall be filled by the General Counsel of this Association, and the General Counsel is authorized to perform all the functions of the Executive Director during that period."

The Article VIII further provides that: (a) The Executive Director shall be responsible for negotiations with the Federation after consultation with the members and the Players Representatives. The membership, by a determination of the majority of the voting members, can direct the Executive Director's negotiation approach with the Federation, including a specific action of which issues to address or not to address with the Federation. (b) All Collective Bargaining Agreements between this Association and the Federation, and any amendments or modifications thereto, shall be signed by a designated Players Representative or the Executive Director and shall require the approval of a majority of the voting members.

== Collective bargaining agreements ==
The USSF and the Players Association entered into their first collective bargaining agreement in March 2001, which was in effect from February 1, 2000, through December 31, 2004. A second collective bargaining agreement, the "2005 CBA", was executed on January 12, 2006. This agreement covered the time period from January 1, 2005, through December 31, 2012. Each of these agreements expressly incorporated the terms of a corresponding Uniform Player Agreement and fee schedule. The 2005 CBA, however, also contained a "no strike, no lockout" clause, which barred the Players Association from authorizing, encouraging, or engaging in any strike, work stoppage, slowdown or other concerted interference with the activities of the Federation during the term of the agreement and barred the USSF from engaging in a lockout during the term of the agreement.

In the fall of 2012, the organization began negotiating a new collective bargaining agreement. However, due to the approaching deadline for the integration of the women's national team into the newly formed National Women's Soccer League (NWSL), negotiations were complicated, and several issues remained unsolved. Regardless, the parties agreed to execute a Memorandum of Understanding (MOU), with the understanding that a fully integrated CBA would be executed once the remaining issues were resolved. Represented by John B. Langel and Ruth Uselton, in March 2013, the USSF and USWNT finalized their new collective bargaining agreement through 2016. This deal carried the federation and the women's national soccer team through the 2015 FIFA Women's World Cup in Canada and the 2016 Olympic Games in Rio. This new four-year CBA would consist on the terms contained in the 2005 CBA as amended, modified, and/or supplemented by the MOU. In December 2015, the new General Counsel Richard M. Nichols, provided the USSF with notice that the Players Associations intended to engage in actions to terminate or modify the Memorandum of Understanding. The organization believed there was no bargaining agreement in place and that the MOU was terminable at will. Additionally, it also refused to agree that it would not engage in a strike or other job action prior to December 2016.

In April 2017, the labor impasse between the Association and USSF was over. The two sides announced that they have ratified a new collective bargaining agreement that goes through 2021. The agreement carried through the 2019 FIFA Women's World Cup in France and the 2020 Olympics in Tokyo. This new CBA included a commitment from the USSF to pay the NWSL salaries for allocated players; a return commitment by the players to compete in the NWSL; a requirement to improve NWSL standards; and the ability of the Players Association to control group likeness rights for non-exclusive licensing in sponsorship categories where USSF does not have a sponsor."

The Players Association signed the team's new collective bargaining agreement with USSF on September 6, 2022, prior to a national team friendly against Nigeria in Washington, D.C. Players Association president Becky Sauerbrunn declared the agreement to be "a huge win for workers and for labor rights" in a speech to the audience.

== Lawsuits ==
In 2016, the union was in a dispute with the USSF over the end date of the collective bargaining agreement. On March 31, 2016, five members of the women's national soccer team filed a charge with the Equal Employment Opportunity Commission alleging wage discrimination, as women soccer players earn less money than players on the men's team. The complaint was filed by Hope Solo, Carli Lloyd, Megan Rapinoe, Becky Sauerbrunn, and Alex Morgan, who argued that the men earned more money for no other reason than being male. The filing cited figures from the USSF's 2015 financial report, which stated that despite the women's team generating nearly $20 million more revenue that year than the men's team, the women were paid about a quarter of what the men earned.

On March 8, 2019, another gender discrimination lawsuit was filed by all 28 members of the women's national team. The filing came just three months before the team begins its title defense at the upcoming 2019 World Cup. The lawsuit was filed under the Equal Pay Act of 1963 and Title VII of the Civil Rights Act in U.S. District Court in Los Angeles. The women argued that the USSF was engaging in discrimination by paying them less than members of the men's national team for substantially equal work, while denying them at least equal playing, training, and travel conditions, match promotion, match support and development, and other terms and conditions of employment. The players behind the legal action demanded a trial by jury on all the issues mentioned in their complaint, including demanding to be paid the same as the men's national team. The women's national team settled with USSF on February 22, 2022, for $24 million, of which $22 million would go to the players.

== See also ==
- National Women's Soccer League Players Association
- U.S. National Soccer Team Players Association (men's)
