= KabineKlar =

German trade union

KabineKlar, located in Kelsterbach, Germany, is the German trade union for flight attendants. It represents all German flight attendants with German airlines.
