= Pierre Ferri-Pisani =

Pierre Ferri-Pisani (30 November 1901 – 21 October 1963) was a prominent French politician and trade unionist who was a part of the French resistance movement during World War II and played a part in the politics of France during the Cold War period in Europe.

== Biography ==
=== Early life ===
Originally from Corsica, he began a career in the merchant navy, but had to give it up because of visual problems. However, he would remain a specialist in maritime problems all his life.

A tireless worker, well-educated and endowed with real oratorical talent, his political and union career was not always up to his ambitions and personal qualities.

In 1925, he met Simon Sabiani, of whom he became the private secretary. In May 1927, he was elected head of the Union of Registered Maritimers, which allowed Sabiani to control an organization representing five thousand sailors.

After the municipal elections of May 1929, Sabiani allowed Siméon Flaissières to be re-elected mayor of Marseille against Henri Tasso and the SFIO. Ferri-Pisani joined the latter.

In October 1931, he stood in the cantonal elections against Sabiani whom he reproached in the “Popular de Provence” for having become an adventurer, who had forgotten his proletarian origins and who was now at the service of his personal interests. After an epic electoral campaign strewn with brawls and gunshots, he was beaten by Sabiani, the only one from his camp elected to the General Council.

In 1936, he approached the Communists, of whom he was soon to become the implacable enemy. In view of the municipal elections which took place in May 1935, socialists and communists had indeed united to block the road to the Ribot-Sabiani list. Elected municipal councillor on the list of the new mayor, Henri Tasso, he was his deputy for roads until October 1938, when he resigned in solidarity with his friend Jean Cavanelli, deputy for Finance, himself forced to resign following a conflict with Noël Carrega, a leader of the CGT (reunified in March 1936), over the overstaffed number of municipal employees.

During the Spanish Civil War, he took part in sending arms to support the Republican government.

=== World War 2 ===
After the 1940 armistice, he was placed under house arrest in Pélissanne by the Vichy regime. He then joined the Franc-Tireur de Marseille resistance network when the German army invaded the southern zone in November 1942. In the spring of 1943, he was among the many victims of one of the most important operations carried out against the Resistance in the south by Dunker-Delage, head of SIPO and SD Marseille. Arrested by the Gestapo on 19 April 1943, he was deported to Buchenwald, then to the salt mines of Magdeburg.

=== Cold War and Death ===
Though he was believed to be dead, Ferri-Pisani returned to Marseilles in the summer of 1945. He wanted to recover his place at the head of the SFIO and the CGT, but he came up against the new socialist generation led by Gaston Defferre.

Eliminated from the SFIO, he then devoted himself to trade union activity at a time when a fraction was formed led by Léon Jouhaux and above all Robert Bothereau, who refused communist hegemony in the CGT and was to provoke a trade union split in the origin of the Force Ouvrière union. Ferri-Pisani actively campaigned in Marseille for this split, which received logistical and financial support from the CIA via the AFL-CIO and one of its foreign branches FTUC (Free Trade Union Committee). FTUC was led by a CIA agent, Jay Lovestone and his friend Irving Brown, with the aim of weakening the World Federation of Trade Unions. When Force Ouvrière was formed on 12 April 1948, Ferri-Pisani became president of the National Merchant Navy Federation of the new trade union center and he was one of those, like Augustin Marsily, head of the dockers' unions who received subsidies from Irving Brown to support their union.

The three men would meet again in the following years because, between 1949 and 1952, the port of Marseilles is the stake of a terrible battle between the partisans of the wars of Korea and Indochina who would make common cause to control it against the sailors and dockers of the CGT supported by the Communist Party who opposed these two wars. After having created, in April 1950, "a Mediterranean vigilance committee" of seafarers, Ferry-Pisani and Marsily took part with Irving Brown in a congress of the Transport Workers' International which was held in Marseilles and whose aim was to '"study the means of preventing work stoppages and taking all useful measures for unloading war material", these means including the use of "thugs" from the Marseilles environment that Ferry-Pisani and Marsilly would recruit, with the help of the great godfathers who are the Guérini brothers, and whom the CIA would pay. The role and the methods of the CIA at this time were confirmed by Gaston Defferre and by Thomas W. Braden, former head of the CIA.

If this anti-communist offensive was a success on the immediate plan obliging Marseille sailors and dockers to retreat, it would not prevent France from being obliged to withdraw from Vietnam. Disappointed by the course of general politics, and in particular by the political management of the Algerian crisis by General De Gaulle, Ferri-Pisani committed suicide on 21 October 1963.

== See also ==
- Workers' Force
