= Maida Springer Kemp =

American labor organizer (1910-2005)

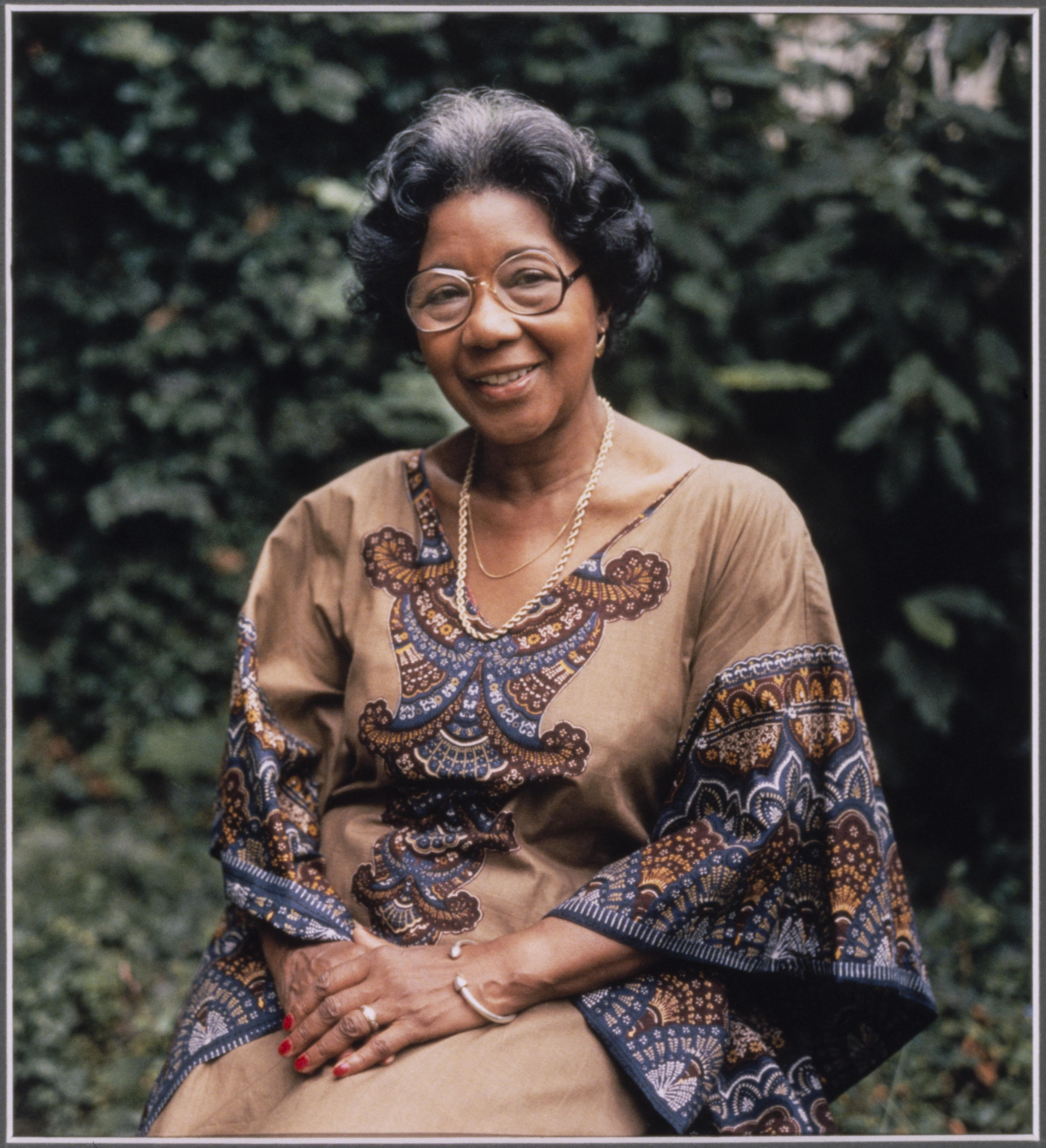
- Born: Maida Stewart; May 12, 1910; Rio Sidra, Panama
- Died: March 29, 2005 (aged 94); Pittsburgh, Pennsylvania, US
- Other name: Maida Springer
- Education: Ruskin Labor College
- Occupation: Labor organizer
- Spouses: Owen Springer (m. 1927; div. 1955); James Kemp (m. 1965; died 1983)

Maida Springer Kemp (née Stewart; May 12, 1910 – March 29, 2005) was an American labor organizer who worked extensively in the garment industry to improve labor standards for men and women in America through the Local Union 22. She was also known for her extensive work in Africa for the AFL–CIO. Nicknamed "Mama Maida", she advised fledgling labor unions, set up education and training programs, and liaised between American and African labor leaders. In 1945, traveling to England on a labor-exchange trip, as well as observing the conditions of war-torn Britain she would become one of the first African-American woman to represent US labor abroad. She was also active in the civil rights movement, and advocated for women's rights around the world. She was very active in these movements for most of her life.

== Early life ==
Springer was born Maida Stewart on May 12, 1910, in Panama, to Harold and Adina Stewart. Her father was a Barbadian immigrant who worked on the Panama Canal project. At the age of seven, she moved with her family to Harlem, New York, where she attended St. Mark's Catholic School. Her parents divorced soon after, and Springer was raised by her politically active mother. The Stewart home was a gathering place for activists and members of the Universal Negro Improvement Association (UNIA), whose accounts of personal experiences with racism had a lasting influence on Springer. Henrietta Vinton Davis, a founding member of the UNIA, was an inspiration as a female activist.

Springer attended the Manual Training and Industrial School for Colored Youth in Bordentown, New Jersey, between 1923 and 1926, where she was taught by Lester Granger and William H. Hastie. She married Owen Springer in 1927. The couple felt the hardships of the Great Depression; son Eric Springer was born in 1929. Owen Springer's work as a dental tools technician was increasingly slow and his pay declined. Maida Springer then decided to start work in the garment factories.

== Career ==
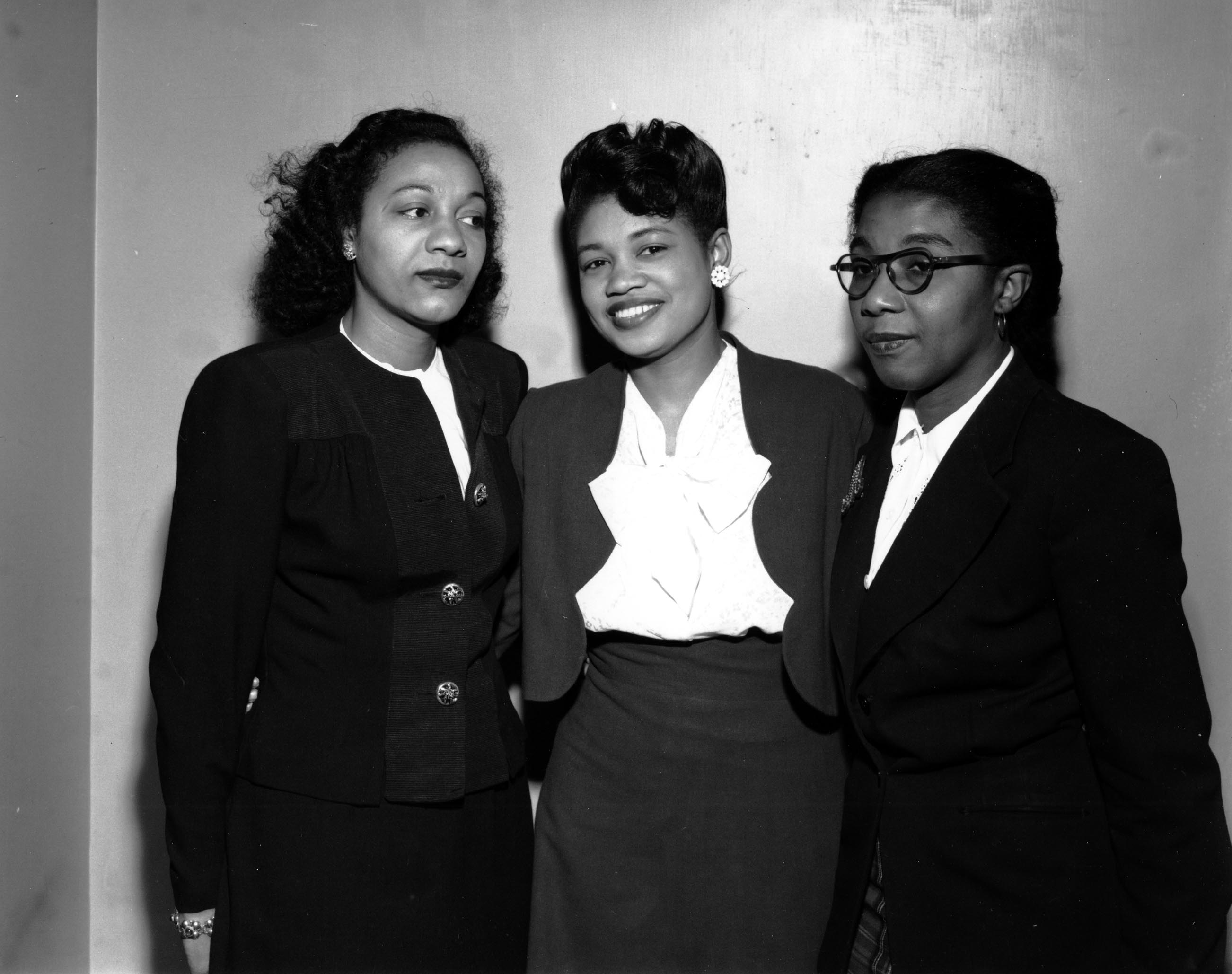
Kemp (right) poses with two other women c. 1940s

In 1933, she met A. Philip Randolph, who became a lifelong friend and mentor. That same year she joined the Dressmakers' Union Local 22 of the International Ladies' Garment Workers' Union (ILGWU). Local 22's connections included Jay Lovestone. Chris Zimmerman saw the importance of gaining favor with other groups of people. As the manager of Local 22, he helped Springer rise within the organization. The joint efforts of Springer and newly elected union president David Dubinsky started a change that would shape the American work force into what it is today. Franklin D. Roosevelt and the National Industrial Recovery Act gave union sympathizers more room to grow and spread their message. The ILGWU went on strike in 1933 to demand better conditions and pay. Dubinsky and his collaborators fought for a minimum wage as well as fixed hour work weeks. Union membership skyrocketed to almost 200,000 members by the end of 1934.

During the period of 1934–1942, Springer was a tireless worker for Local 22. She was involved not only in the executive and educational boards, but also was a shop representative and would meet with the factory bosses and settle on prices to make work fair among workers. She took courses offered by the American Federation of Labor (AFL), the Wellesley College Institute for Social Progress, and the Hudson Shore Labor School. In time she became an ILGWU shop representative, and eventually rose to the executive board and education committee. In addition to labor issues, Local 22 took an active part in civil rights activities in the Harlem community.

Over the next few years, Springer became increasingly active in union activities in New York. She served as education director of Local 132 of the Plastic Button and Novelty Workers' Union from 1942 to 1945. Springer's first official assignment as the education director for Local 132 came in 1942. During World War II, as most of the men had gone off to Europe to fight, positions in the shops had to be filled. Springer's task as education head had her create lesson plans informing new union members about what a union can offer as well as the goals set out for them. She would run for the New York State Assembly on the American Labor Party ticket in 1942. From there she was appointed to the War Price and Rationing Board of the Office of Price Administration in 1944.

In 1945, Springer took on becoming a business agent for Local 22. Her work consisted of overseeing complaints as well as implementation. That same year she would become the first African-American woman to represent US labor abroad when she traveled to England as an AFL delegate, on a trip sponsored by the United States Office of War Information, to study wartime working conditions in Great Britain. Springer would go on to experience first hand the actions and sacrifices made by Britain and Europe as a whole, from subway tunnels in London being refashioned into air-raid bunkers for the masses. Springer also met Anna Freud and her psychological work with children dealing with the shock from the constant bombing and worry. From 1948 to 1951, she served as business agent for Dressmakers' Union Local 22 of the ILGWU; she was the first African-American business agent to represent a district.

== International work ==
In the 1950s, Springer began working for the AFL as an advisor to newly founded labor unions in Tanzania, Kenya, and Ghana, where she came to be known as "Mama Maida". In 1951, sponsored by the American Labor Education Service, she traveled to Sweden and Denmark to observe workers' education programs. She then took an eight-month hiatus from ILGWU to study at Ruskin Labor College, Oxford University, on an Urban League Fellowship. In 1955, she attended the first International Confederation of Free Trade Unions (ICFTU) conference in Accra, Ghana, as one of five observers, of which she was the only woman. In 1957, she played a key role in the founding of Solidarity House in Nairobi. Through her efforts she had brought together African traders and continued their education on understanding the inner workings of a union, as well as implementation.

In 1959, Springer went to work for the AFL–CIO's Department of International Affairs as its representative to Africa. For the next several years she made her home alternately in Dar es Salaam (Tanzania), Nairobi (Kenya), and Brooklyn, New York. She started an exchange program for Africans to study at Harvard University, founded a trade school in Kenya whose mission included expanding opportunities for women, established a post-secondary scholarship for Tanzanian girls, and started the Maida Fund to enable farm workers in East Africa to return to school. In the course of her work she befriended many of Africa's emerging leaders, including Julius Nyerere of Tanzania and Kwame Nkrumah of Ghana. Between 1957 and 1963, she attended the national independence ceremonies of Ghana, Nigeria, Tanzania, and Kenya.

In 1964, Springer represented the US at the 48th session of the International Labour Organization conference in Geneva. In 1966, she resumed working as a general organizer for ILGWU. Later she worked for the A. Philip Randolph Institute. In the 1970s, as a consultant for the Asian-American Free Labor Institute (AAFLI), she worked with trade unions in Turkey, where she helped introduce women into the labor movement by establishing the Women's Bureau of TÜRK-İŞ. Initially her efforts were met with resistance by male union leaders who wanted women to participate in the organizing work, but had little interest in the concerns of women workers, such as equal pay, equal opportunity, and child care. She also worked in Indonesia to get more women involved in the labor movement. She attended International Women's Year conferences in Mexico and Nairobi in 1975, and the Pan African Conference on the Role of Trade Union Women in 1977.

== Personal life ==
Springer Kemp married Owen Springer in the late 1920s, and had a son, Eric. The marriage ended in divorce. In 1965 she married James Kemp. She was a persistent worker, as well as very involved in the labor movement. By the nature of her work she was rarely home which put strains on her marriage with James Kemp. Both were committed individuals to civil rights and labor equality. In the late 1970s Springer Kemp moved to Pittsburgh, where she lived the rest of her life. She died after a long illness on March 29, 2005, aged 94.

== Honors and awards ==
Springer Kemp received many awards over the course of her 50-year career, including the National Council of Negro Women's Woman of the Year Award, a Candace Award from the National Coalition of 100 Black Women, the Bessie Abramowitz Hillman Award from the Coalition of Labor Union Women, the first annual Rosina Tucker Award from the A. Philip Randolph Institute, the Women's Rights Award from the American Federation of Teachers, and an honorary Doctor of Humane Letters degree from Brooklyn College, City University of New York. The Maida Springer Kemp Fund, created in her honor by UNITE and the AFL–CIO, combats child labor in East Africa by sending children to school for technical training, providing financial aid to women to start small businesses, and supporting needlework schools. Lawyer Pauli Murray dedicated her memoir, Song in a Weary Throat, to Springer Kemp.

Springer Kemp was a member of the National Council of Negro Women, the National Association for the Advancement of Colored People, the African-American Free Labor Institute, the Asian-American Free Labor Institute, the National Organization for Women, and the Coalition of Labor Union Women.

== See also ==
- Pauli Murray
