= Irving Brown =

20th-century American trade unionist

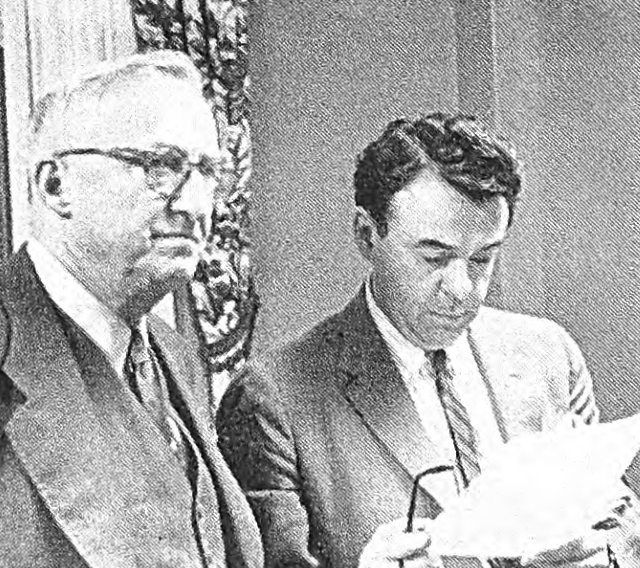
- Brown (right) with Jay Lovestone at the AFL-CIO's second annual convention, December 1957
- Born: November 20, 1911; Bronx, New York City, United States
- Died: February 10, 1989 (aged 77); Paris, France
- Occupation: Trade unionist

Irving Brown (November 20, 1911 – February 10, 1989) was an American trade unionist and leader in the American Federation of Labor (AFL) and subsequently the AFL-CIO. Brown played a prominent role in Western Europe and Africa during the Cold War in splintering communist-led labor movements. Along with expelled former Communist Party of the USA member Jay Lovestone, he founded the American Institute for Free Labor Development in 1962.

== Early life ==
Born in the Bronx, New York City, in 1911, he became a boxer before he joined a trade union, where he clashed with the Teamsters. He studied at New York University and at the Columbia University. During the latter half of the 1930s, Brown was an organizer for the Automobile Workers Union. In 1940 Brown began to organize for the American Federation of Labor on a national level, and by 1942 Brown had become a labor representative to the War Production Board.

As a lieutenant of the US Army, he helped the Office of Strategic Services (OSS) plan the invasion of Sicily and the landing in the south in Provence.

== Cold War ==
He arrived in Paris in November 1945 and organized anticommunist unions. He supported in particular the creation of the French Force ouvrière (FO) union, which he subsidized by André Bergeron and Léon Jouhaux in 1947, and the Italian Confederation of Workers' Trade Unions (CISL), created in 1950. Until 1986, Brown was present at every annual congresses in FO. The AFL-CIO's Free Trade Union Committee subsidized FO and other anticommunist unions in Europe.

In 1949, alongside Jay Lovestone, he supported the split in the World Federation of Trade Unions (WFTU) to create the International Confederation of Free Trade Unions (ICFTU). The ICFTU included the AFL-CIO, the British Trades Union Congress, the FO, the Italian Confederation of Workers' Trade Unions, and the Spanish Unión General de Trabajadores. Thereafter, the WFTU represented the Eastern Bloc, and the ICFTU represented the so-called "free world". As a friend of W. Averell Harriman, who was in charge of the Marshall Plan, Brown easily diverted funds from the Marshall Plan to support anticommunist organizations.

By 1952, his activities were already well known, and he was the subject of an article by Time magazine, "The Most Dangerous Man." According to Time, he was charged of the mission by the AFL Free Trade Union Committee. Brown gave financial support to anticommunist movements that broke the 1947 strikes in Italy and France. He also helped organize the anticommunist coalition of free trade unions in Greece and the Mediterranean Port Committee, which wrested control of French, Italian, and Greek ports from the communists. In Marseille, he gave his support to Pierre Ferri-Pisani, a former municipal counsellor.

Established in France, he headed the international relations of the AFL-CIO from his offices at 10, rue de la Paix, in Paris. From 1951 to 1954, the CIA division, headed by Thomas Braden, provided $1 million a year to Brown and Lovestone ($1,600,000 in 1954). He was a member of the anti-Castro organization, Citizens Committee for a Free Cuba.

In 1952, he was in Helsinki to support the trade unionists who had decided to vote to quit the World Federation of Trade Unions (WFTU) of mainly-communist unions.

In the 1980s, the election of the Socialist Party candidate François Mitterrand to the presidency in 1981 made the National Endowment for Democracy (NED) foundation subsidize, alongside the AFL-CIO, the right-wing National Inter-University Union (UNI). Brown believed, "France... is threatened by the Communist apparatus.... It is a clear and present danger if the present is thought of as 10 years from now."

== Later life ==
Brown started suffering from serious health problems in 1986. He was decorated by US President Ronald Reagan in 1988 of the Presidential Medal of Freedom, and he died the following year.

== Publications ==
=== Articles ===
- "Algerians Die for Freedom, not Moscow." Africa Today, vol. 3, no. 4 (Jul.-Aug. 1956), p. 6. JSTOR 4183817.

Political offices
Preceded by Ernie Lee	Director of AFL-CIO International Affairs Dept. 1982–1986	Succeeded by Tom Kahn
