= Fédération générale des fonctionnaires =

Trade union of France

The Fédération générale des fonctionnaires or FGF (lit. 'General Federation of Civil Servants') is a trade union federation for civil servants in France.

The federation was established by Workers' Force (FO) in 1953. It currently brings together six federations affiliated to FO:

- Federation of Equipment, Environment, Transport and Services
- Federation of General State Administration
- Federation of Trade Unions of the Ministry of the Interior
- FO Defence
- FO Finance Federation
- National Federation of Education, Culture and Vocational Training

== General Secretaries ==
1953: Pierre Tribié
1973: André Giauque
1987: Roland Gaillard
2003: Gérard Noguès
2009: Anne Baltazar
2012: Christian Grolier
