= Finance Federation =

Finance Federation is the name of:

- CFDT Finance Federation, a trade union in France
- Finance Federation (Denmark), a trade union
- Finance Federation (France), a trade union affiliated to the CGT

== See also ==
- FO Finances, a French trade union
