= FTUC =

FTUC may refer to:

- Fiji Trades Union Congress
- Free Trade Union Committee
