= FGF =

FGF may refer to:

- Fibroblast growth factor
- Galician Football Federation (Spanish: Federación Galega de Fútbol), in Spain
- Guinean Football Federation (French: Fédération Guinéenne de Football)
- Federação Gaúcha de Futebol, the Football Federation of Rio Grande do Sul, Brazil
- Federação Goiana de Futebol, the Football Federation of Goiás, Brazil
- Fédération générale des fonctionnaires, a trade union for French civil servants
