= Robert J. Alexander =

American academic (1918–2010)

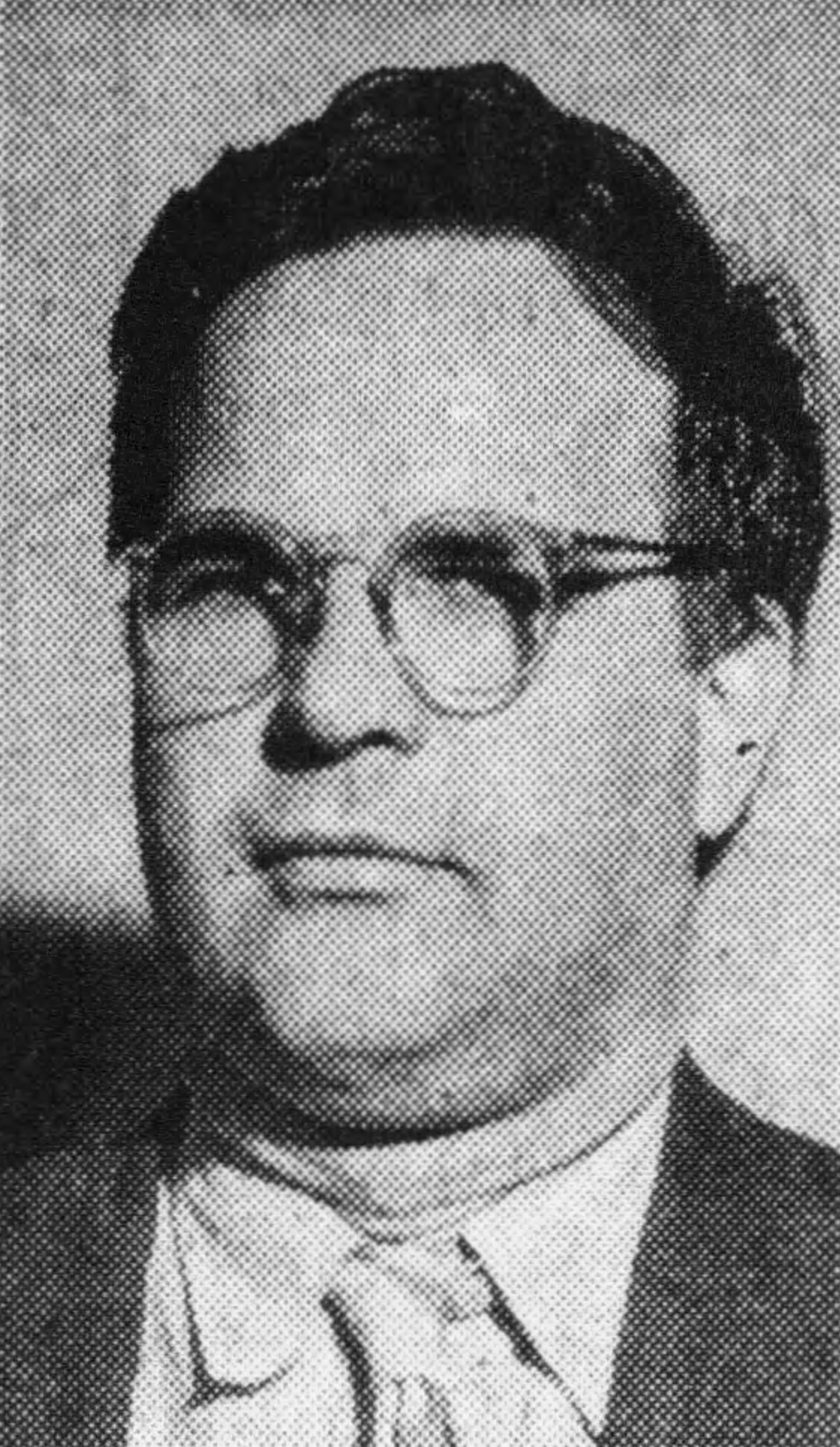
- Alexander c. 1959
- Born: November 26, 1918; Canton, Ohio, United States
- Died: April 27, 2010 (aged 91); Piscataway, New Jersey, United States
- Occupation: Academic

Robert Jackson Alexander (November 26, 1918 – April 27, 2010) was an American political activist, writer, and academic who spent most of his professional career at Rutgers University. He is best remembered for his pioneering studies on the trade union movement in Latin America and dissident communist political parties, including ground-breaking monographs on the International Communist Right Opposition, Maoism, and the international Trotskyist movement.

== Biography ==
=== Early years ===
Robert J. Alexander was born in Canton, Ohio, on November 26, 1918. His family moved to Leonia, New Jersey, in 1922, when his father, Ralph S. Alexander accepted a teaching position at Columbia University. Alexander graduated from the public high school in 1936 and matriculated at Columbia, receiving a B.A. degree in 1940 and a Master of Arts degree the following year. In 1936, Alexander took a senior trip to Spain, which sparked a lifelong interest in Hispanic cultures.

Alexander was drafted in April 1942 into the United States Army Air Corps. He spent 25 months stationed in Great Britain, during which time he spent his off-hours speaking to a number of British trade unionists, taking extensive notes of his conversations. These discussions helped Alexander to refine an interview style of research that would later become a hallmark of his academic work.

After demobilization, he began work for the State Department. While there, he received a grant from the Office of International Exchange of Persons of the State Department to work on his Ph.D. dissertation on labor relations in Chile, where he conducted hundreds of interviews in virtually all the major factories of the country. He received his Ph.D. from Columbia in 1950.

Alexander was married to Joan O. Powell in 1949. The couple had two children.

=== Political career ===
Alexander was active in the socialist and trade union movements. In 1934, politicized by the Great Depression, he joined the Young People's Socialist League (YPSL), the youth section of the Socialist Party of America. He continued organizing activities for YPSL while at Columbia and remained an active member of its parent group, the Socialist Party of America, serving as a member of its executive council 1957 to 1966. When the Socialist Party changed its name in December 1972 to the Social Democrats, USA (SDUSA), he maintained his membership until 1980; according to Perrone's biographical sketch, Alexander thought that SDUSA had become "too conservative".

It was as a leader of the New Jersey YPSLs that he first met Jay Lovestone, then head of the Communist Party, Opposition. Alexander would later go on six missions to Latin America for Lovestone, first under the auspices of the Free Trade Union Committee, then under the direction of the AFL-CIO International Department.

Alexander was a member of the board of directors of the Rand School of Social Science from 1952 until its closure in 1956. He served on the League for Industrial Democracy's National Council and was an active member of Americans for Democratic Action and a delegate to several of its national conventions.

During the 1950s, Alexander served as a consultant for the American Federation of Labor and AFL-CIO on the organized labor movement in Latin American and the Caribbean. In 1961, he was named by president-elect John F. Kennedy to the Task Force on Latin America, which recommended the establishment of the Alliance for Progress.

Alexander was also a lifelong member of the Council on Foreign Relations.

=== Academic career ===
Alexander became an instructor at Rutgers while still in Chile in the late 1940s. He was promoted to assistant professor in 1950, associate professor in 1956, and full professor in 1961.

Although Alexander was a member of the Economics department at Rutgers, he was an interdisciplinary scholar, working extensively in the fields of political science and history. Alexander was regarded as a champion of the principle of academic freedom and was a founder of the faculty union at Rutgers. In 1963, Alexander achieved his "highest honor", the Order of the Condor of the Andes from the Bolivian government.

Alexander was a founding member of the Middle Atlantic Council of Latin American Studies (MACLAS), and served as the group's president from 1987 to 1988.

During his career, Alexander wrote and published extensively on Latin American politics and trade union movements, as well as surveys on dissident radical movements such as the Right Opposition, Trotskyism, and Maoism.

Alexander retired from Rutgers in 1989.

=== Death and legacy ===
Robert J. Alexander died on April 27, 2010. He was 91 years old at the time of his death.

Alexander's voluminous papers are housed by the Special Collections and University Archives section of Rutgers University, located in New Brunswick, New Jersey. The collection includes 215 cubic feet (6,100 L) of material, which is housed off site.

== Works ==
- Labor Parties of Latin America. New York: League for Industrial Democracy, 1942.
- What Do You Know about British Labor?. New York: Rand School Press, 1942.
- Labour Movements in Latin America. London: Fabian Publications, 1947.
- Perón Unmasked: The Martyrdom of the Free Trade Union Movement in Argentina. Washington, D.C., Educational and Publicity Department, Inter-American Regional Organization-ICFTU, 1950.
- The Peron Era. New York, Columbia University Press 1951.
- World Labor Today: Highlights of Trade Unions on Six Continents, 1945-1952. New York: League for Industrial Democracy, 1952.
- Communism in Latin America. New Brunswick, NJ: Rutgers University Press, 1957.
- The Bolivian National Revolution. New Brunswick, NJ: Rutgers University Press, 1958.
- Two Revolutions. Caracas: Imprenta Naciónal, 1960.
- The Struggle for Democracy in Latin America. New York: Macmillan, 1961.
- Labor Relations in Argentina, Brazil, and Chile. New York: McGraw-Hill, 1962.
- A Primer of Economic Development. New York: Macmillan, 1962.
- Today's Latin America. Garden City, N.Y., Doubleday, 1962.
- American Finance Capitalism: A Discussion. Calcutta: Firma K.L. Mukhopadhyay, 1963.
- The Venezuelan Democratic Revolution: A Profile of the Regime of Rómulo Betancourt. New Brunswick, NJ: Rutgers University Press, 1964.
- Latin America: An Introduction to the History, Geography, Cultures and Political and Economic Problems of the 20 Latin American Republics. New York: Scholastic Book Services, 1964.
- Latin-American Politics and Government. New York: Harper & Row, 1965.
- Organized Labor in Latin America. New York: Free Press, 1965.
- An Introduction to Argentina. New York: Praeger, 1969.
- The Communist Party of Venezuela. Stanford, California: Hoover Institution Press, 1969.
- Trotskyism in Latin America. Stanford, California: Hoover Institution Press, 1973.
- Latin American Political Parties. New York: Praeger, 1973.
- Aprismo: The Ideas and Doctrines of Víctor Raúl Haya de la Torre. Kent, Ohio: Kent State University Press, 1973.
- A History of the Economics Department of Rutgers College. New Brunswick, NJ: Rutgers College Economics Dept., 1974.
- Agrarian Reform in Latin America. New York: Macmillan, 1974.
- Four Alexander Families of Wayne County, Ohio. New Brunswick, NJ: Mega-Ton Publishers, 1975.
- Report of Commission of Enquiry into Human Rights in Paraguay of the International League for Human Rights. With Ben Stephansky. New York: International League for Human Rights, 1976.
- A New Development Strategy. Maryknoll, NY: Orbis Books, 1976.
- Arturo Alessandri: A Biography. Ann Arbor: University Microfilms International, 1977.
- The Tragedy of Chile. Westport, CT: Greenwood Press, 1978.
- Juan Domingo Peron: A History. Boulder, CO: Westview Press, 1979.
- The Right Opposition: The Lovestoneites and the International Communist Opposition of the 1930s. Westport, CT: Greenwood Press, 1981.
- Bolivia: past, present, and future of its politics. New York, Praeger; Stanford, Calif: Hoover Institution Press, 1982.
- Rómulo Betancourt and the Transformation of Venezuela. New Brunswick, NJ: Transaction Books, 1982.
- Political Parties of the Americas: Canada, Latin America, and the West Indies (General Editor). Westport, CT: Greenwood Press, 1982.
- Biographical Dictionary of Latin American and Caribbean Political Leaders (General Editor). New York: Greenwood Press, 1988.
- Venezuela's Voice for Democracy: Conversations and Correspondence with Rómulo Betancourt. New York: Praeger, 1990.
- International Trotskyism 1929–1985: A Documented Analysis of the Movement. Durham, NC: Duke University Press, 1991.
- Juscelino Kubitschek and the Development of Brazil. Athens, Ohio: Ohio University Center for International Studies, 1991.
- The ABC Presidents: Conversations and Correspondence with the Presidents of Argentina, Brazil, and Chile Westport, CT: Praeger, 1992.
- The Bolivarian Presidents: Conversations and Correspondence with Presidents of Bolivia, Peru, Ecuador, Colombia, and Venezuela. Westport, CT: Praeger, 1994.
- Presidents of Central America, Mexico, Cuba, and Hispaniola: Conversations and Correspondence Westport, CT: Praeger, 1995.
- Presidents, Prime Ministers, and Governors of the English-Speaking Caribbean and Puerto Rico: Conversations and Correspondence. Westport, CT: Praeger, 1997.
- The Anarchists in the Spanish Civil War. Westport, CT: Praeger, 1999.
- International Maoism in the Developing World. Westport, CT: Praeger, 1999.
- International Maoism in the Developed World. Westport, CT: Praeger, 2001. Google Preview
- Haya de la Torre, Man of the Millennium: His Life, Ideas and Continuing Relevance. Lima, Peru: Víctor Raúl Haya de la Torre Institute, 2001.
- A History of Organized Labor in Cuba. Westport, Conn., Praeger, 2002.
- A History of Organized Labor in Brazil. With Eldon Parker. Westport, CT: Westport, Conn., Praeger, 2003.
- A History of Organized Labor in Argentina. Westport, Conn.: Praeger, 2003.
- A History of Organized Labor in English-speaking West Indies. With Eldon Parker. Westport, CT: Praeger, 2004.
- A History of Organized Labor in Uruguay and Paraguay. With Eldon Parker. Westport, CT: Praeger, 2005.
- A History of Organized Labor in Bolivia. With Eldon Parker. Westport, CT: Praeger, 2005.
- A History of Organized Labor in Peru and Ecuador. With Eldon Parker. Westport, CT: Praeger, 2007.
- A History of Organized Labor in Panama and Central America. With Eldon Parker. Westport, CT: Praeger, 2008.
- International Labor Organizations and Organized Labor in Latin America and the Caribbean: A History. With Eldon Parker. Santa Barbara, CA: Praeger/ABC-CLIO, 2009.
