= Offie =

Offie may refer to:

- Off-licence, a UK shop licensed to sell alcoholic beverages for consumption off the premises
- Carmel Offie (1909-1972), CIA official dismissed for homosexuality
- "The Offies", colloquial name for the Off West End Theatre Awards
