= André Bergeron =

French trade unionist (1922–2014)

General Secretary of Workers' Force
- In office 1963–1989
- Preceded by: Robert Bothereau
- Succeeded by: Marc Blondel

Personal details
- Born: 1 January 1922 Suarce, Territoire de Belfort, France
- Died: 19 September 2014 (aged 92) Belfort, France

André Louis Bergeron (1 January 1922 – 19 September 2014) was a French trade union leader.

Born in Suarce, Bergeron was brought up in the Plymouth Brethren faith, but broke with it while still at school, joining the Socialist Youth. He started an apprenticeship in printing, and joined a union affiliated to the General Confederation of Labour (CGT), but the printing company closed in 1939, before he had qualified, and he instead found work with Postes, Télégraphes et Téléphones. During World War II, he avoided serving in the Nazi forces, and in 1941 was arrested, spending much of the war interned in Austria, undertaking forced labour.

After the war, Bergeron moved to Belfort and to printing, and in 1946, he was elected as secretary of the local typographers' union. Along with the majority of local trade unionists, he left the CGT and joined the new Workers' Force (FO). From April 1948, he worked full-time for the federation as its representative for Belfort, and from 1949, he also led the Book Federation. He met Irving Brown, who was helping fund FO with CIA money, and the two became friends, Brown directly funding Bergeron's post. He also helped found the FO Book Federation, and although it saw little success, he was elected to the executive of the International Graphical Federation.

In 1950, Bergeron began working in FO's national office, where he was a notable voice in support of Algerian independence. While initially highly controversial, he was eventually able to get a union position agreed, and his skills in this led him to win election as general secretary of FO in 1963. He was also appointed as a vice president of the International Confederation of Free Trade Unions. He largely maintained existing federation positions, pushing for moderate reforms, and working closely with government from both left and right, but strongly opposing the French Communist Party. He championed co-management between workers and employers. In May 1968, he obtained an increase of 3 francs in the minimum wage, a higher figure than the CGT leadership had requested.

Bergeron retired in 1989. He was critical of the more radical positions adopted by his successor, Marc Blondel. He became president of the Institute for Social History, and wrote several books, including his memoirs. He died in 2014.

Trade union offices
Preceded by New position	General Secretary of the Book Federation; 1949–1963	Succeeded by Pierre Magnier
Preceded by Robert Bothereau	General Secretary of Workers' Force; 1963–1989	Succeeded by Marc Blondel
