= Oreste Capocci =

Oreste Capocci (13 May 1888 – 29 October 1950) was a French trade unionist.

Born in Paris, Capocci worked as a tailor, then as a sales representative. In 1907, he joined the Socialist Revolutionary Youth, soon becoming its secretary in the 19th arrondissement. He was called up for military service, but attended anti-military meetings, and was imprisoned for this. On release, he joined the Young Revolutionary Guard, winning election to its executive committee, then joined the French Section of the Workers' International (SFIO), becoming one of its leading youth activists in Paris.

Capocci served during World War I and immediately abandoned his anti-war stance, remaining a member of the SFIO, but arguing that it should focus on conditions after the war. He became associated with the right wing of the party, and in 1920, was their successful candidate for a place on the executive of the Federation of Employees' Unions. In 1921, he became the general secretary of a union representing workers in small shops in Paris. When the left wing of the union movement split away, he remained loyal to the federation, and in 1923, he was elected to the executive of the General Confederation of Labour (CGT). In 1929, he was elected as general secretary of the Federation of Employees, and he remained in the post when the left-wing rejoined.

The unions were dissolved in 1940, and Capocci found work with the Social Insurance Union. He joined the Economic and Trade Union Studies Committee, and publicly opposed the Labor Charter, an action which won him the Medal of the Resistance. Immediately after the Liberation of France, the unions were reconstituted, and Capocci returned to his post as general secretary. In 1946, he was also elected to the executive of the SFIO.

Capocci remained opposed to the communist leadership of the CGT, and he was a leading activist in founding Workers' Force, as an alternative. He served on its executive from its formation, in 1947, and led the majority of his union into the new federation. That year, he also won election as president of the International Federation of Commercial, Clerical, Professional and Technical Employees, serving until 1949, when he became vice-president. He died in 1950.

Trade union offices
Preceded by Georges Buisson	General Secretary of the Federation of Employees; 1929–1950	Succeeded by Adolphe Sidro
Preceded by Joseph Hallsworth	President of the International Federation of Commercial, Clerical, Professional and Technical Employees; 1947–1949	Succeeded by James Young
