= Frédéric Souillot =

French trade unionist

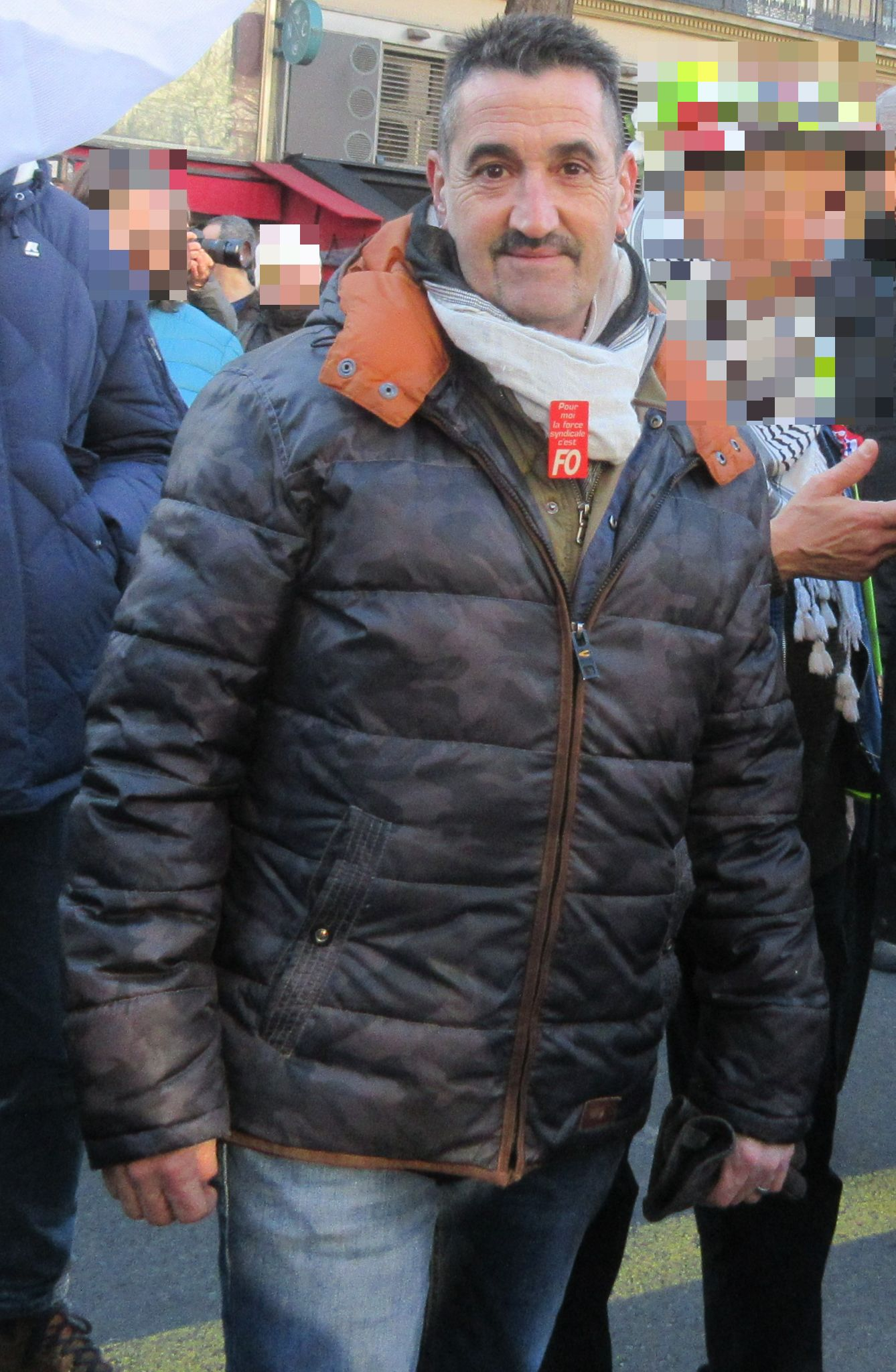
- Frédéric Souillot in 2023

General Secretary of the Workers' Force
- Incumbent
- Assumed office 3 June 2022
- Preceded by: Yves Veyrier

Personal details
- Born: Dijon

Frédéric Souillot (born 1967 in Dijon, Côte-d'Or department) is a French trade unionist. He is the General Secretary of the Workers' Force (CGT-FO) since 2022.

== Life ==
Souillot was born in Dijon in 1967 as the son of a gas-worker. He described his parents as "not revolutionary" however they were "committed against social inequalities". At the age of 16, he obtained a pastry-confectioner and chocolate-ice cream maker diploma. In 1994, he was hired as a specialist in the maintenance and installation of service stations at Schlumberger (now Tokheim), and in 1995 he joined the Workers' Force.

In 2008, he joined FO Metals and became General Secretary in charge of steel and base metals workers.

In 2015, he was appointed as the Confederal Secretary of the Workers' Force. On 3 June 2022, during the 25th Congress of the Workers' Force in Rouen, he was voted as the General Secretary of the Workers' Force.

He opposes the 2023 French pension reform law and, after his election, said that he wished to make the subject "the mother of all battles". He represents the Workers' Force in the unrest that arose out of the opposition to the reform law.
