= National Federation of Construction Workers =

Trade union of France

The National Federation of Construction Workers (French: Fédération nationale des travailleurs de la construction, FNTC) was a trade union representing workers in the construction industry in France.

The union was founded in 1920 as the "National Federation of Workers in the Building Industries of France and the Colonies", bringing together the federations of masons, stone workers, painters, carpenters, and joiners. Like its predecessors, the union affiliated to the General Confederation of Labour (CGT).

In 1921, the union left the CGT, and affiliated to the new United General Confederation of Labour. In 1923, the National Federation of Public Works merged in, and by 1929, the union had the lengthy official name of the "National Federation of Workers in the Construction Industry, Public Works and Building Materials of France and the Colonies". In the 1970s, it shortened its name to become the "National Federation of Construction Workers".

In the split of 1948, the majority of the union remained loyal to the CGT, with only a minority led by Louis Fréour leaving to form the Workers' Force affiliate, the Federation of Building and Wood.

By 1994, the union had 16,468 members. In 2011, it merged with the Federation of Workers in the Wood, Furniture and Allied Industries, to form the National Federation of Employees in Construction, Wood and Furniture.
