= FO Defence =

Trade union of France

FO Defence (French: FO Défense) is a trade union representing workers connected with defence and armaments.

The union was established in 1948, as the Air, War, Marine Federation, a split from an affiliate of the General Confederation of Labour (CGT). Most of its initial members were administrators, while technicians largely remained with the CGT. It was a founding affiliate of Workers' Force. In 1968, it admitted civil servants in the defence ministry, who transferred from the Federation of General State Administration, and it became the Federation of National Defence Civilian Personnel.

By 2002, the union claimed 30,000 members.

== General Secretaries ==
1948: Rose Étienne
1954: Albert Pontes
1959: Gabriel Gouvert
1979: Jacques Pé
1989:
