= National Federation of Social Action =

Trade union of France

The National Federation of Social Action (French: Fédération nationale de l'action sociale, FNAS) is a trade union representing social security workers in France.

The union originated in 1955 as the National Autonomous and Interprofessional Syndicate of Inadapted Childhood. Initially independent, in 1972, it affiliated to Workers' Force, and reformed as the National Federation of Social Action. By 1995, it claimed 14,500 members.

== General Secretaries ==
1972: François Kermoal
1983: Michel Pinaud
2005: Michel Paulini
2009: Pascal Corbex
