= Carmel Offie =

American intelligence operative

Carmel Offie (September 22, 1909 – June 18, 1972) was a U.S. State Department and later a Central Intelligence Agency (CIA) official, who served as an indispensable assistant to a series of senior officials while combining his official duties with an ability to skirt regulations for his and others' personal benefit. He has been described as "being as close to openly gay as was permissible in 1930s American officialdom". He was dismissed from the CIA in 1950 after an arrest a few years earlier brought his homosexuality to the attention of Senator Joseph McCarthy during the Lavender scare that saw a purge of the State Department personnel because of charges of homosexuality.

== Early life ==
Offie was born in Sharon, Pennsylvania, into a family of Italian immigrants from Caserta. He had at least ten siblings. His father worked as a railroad hand while his mother was illiterate. He worked his way through business college. He entered government service as a stenographer at the Interstate Commerce Commission in Washington, D.C. in 1926.

== State Department career ==
Offie began his State Department career at the American embassy in Tegucigalpa, Honduras, where he was posted from October 1931 to April 1934.

He arrived in Moscow on June 11, 1934, to serve as secretary to Ambassador William C. Bullitt. Bullitt promoted him to vice-consul in 1934. His duties went beyond secretarial tasks to those of personal assistant, companion, and "all-purpose troubleshooter," even accompanying Bullitt on vacation and managing his medications. Offie also corresponded with Bullitt's State Department superiors and FDR's secretary Missy LeHand to report on Bullitt's health and work habits. New York Times reporter C.L. Sulzberger on a visit to Moscow found Offie dealing in fine furs, the sort of special activity Offie became known for in the Foreign Service.

He followed Bullitt when he became Ambassador to France in 1936. There Offie ingratiated himself with French aristocrats and was given a dinner at Maxim's by the Marquis and Marquise de Polignac, which Bullitt reported to Roosevelt with the comment: "I think you will agree with me that [Offie] is already going fast and far". In October 1940 Bullitt told Roosevelt that Offie was "the power behind the throne". Work included social obligations, as when he entertained the young John F. Kennedy and his school chum Lem Billings in 1937. Later on their European tour, the pair bought a dachshund puppy they named Offie. Offie entertained Kennedy again as he passed through Paris in 1939. Kennedy wrote to Billings: "Offie and I are now the greatest of pals and he really is a pretty good guy, though I suppose that it will make you a bit ill to hear it." Offie complained that Kennedy took liberties reading embassy papers without authorization. Kennedy, for his part, joked about having to humor Offie: "Offie has just rung for me, so I guess I have to get the old paper ready and go in and wipe his arse." On another occasion Offie played bridge with the Duchess of Windsor. Bullitt and Offie left Paris two weeks after the Germans took the city in June 1940. Later that year, when Bullitt had left France and not yet received another diplomatic assignment, Offie reported on Bullitt's frame of mind to Jane Ickes, wife of Bullitt's close friend, Secretary of the Interior Harold Ickes, and succeeded in getting the Secretary to raise the question of Bullitt's status with the president himself. He had enemies as well and nicknames like "Carmie Awful" or, in recognition of his peculiar but indispensable assistance to his superiors, "the Royal Dwarf".

In 1941, Bullitt allowed Offie to accept a short-term appointment as third secretary to Anthony Biddle when he was named to represent the U.S. to countries occupied by the Germans. In 1942, when Bullitt was facing financial difficulties, he lived with Offie, who had returned to Washington and had real estate investments there. Bullitt told a friend that "Offie had sponged off him for many years, and now he was sponging off Offie." Offie next followed Bullitt to the Navy Department. Bullitt was known to be too talkative to be trusted with sensitive information about military plans. Offie had one incident that showed similar lack of discretion. Emerging from the American Embassy in London, he was heard to say "Well, it's set for November." He was seized by security agents and released after embassy officials and Bullitt argued on his behalf.

Washington, D.C., police arrested Offie in 1943 and charged him with "disorderly conduct." He had solicited an undercover police officer in Lafayette Park across from the White House. With the knowledge of Secretary of State Cordell Hull, the State Department provided Offie with a cover story in the form of a note asserting that Offie had planned a rendezvous with a confidential source as part of his official duties.

Offie served in Europe during the final years of World War II, beginning first in March 1944 as an aide to Robert Murphy, the State Department's civilian representative to Allied military commanders in Italy, and later following Murphy to an assignment in Germany. He was appointed to the staff of George Atcheson, Jr., the State Department's political adviser to Gen. Douglas MacArthur, head of the American occupation of Japan, but the appointment was rescinded before he ever served in that position. Offie became known for his ability to entertain while providing such luxurious and hard-to-obtain fare as Russian caviar. In 1947, State Department inspectors discovered that he had used diplomatic pouch for private purposes, moving $3,000 in cash to Paris. The shipment of cash was actually a favor for a friend, his former employer Anthony Biddle, who was trying to send money to his former wife. As punishment, he was forbidden all further promotion. He resigned from the State Department in April 1948.

== CIA career ==
Based on recommendations from Chip Bohlen, he returned to government service in September 1948 as deputy to Frank Wisner, head of the Office of Policy Coordination (OPC), a CIA-funded unit within the State Department that was responsible for psychological warfare, propaganda, and surreptitious funding designed to destabilize the Soviet Union and its allies. Offie had long been a committed anti-Communist, having seen life in Stalin's Russia in the late 1930s and watched the Soviets take control of Eastern Europe at the end of World War II. He was widely recognized for his work ethic, rising in the early morning hours to speak to Eastern European contacts, and for an extraordinary ability to process multiple streams of information, digesting complex documents while conducting telephone negotiations. He continued to ingratiate himself with superiors, helping find a cook for Wisner and laying out funds to bring two servants to the U.S. for George F. Kennan. He was a regular attendee at Georgetown dinners. He counted among his enemies Kermit Roosevelt, Jr., a prominent CIA operative in the Middle East, who described Offie years later as "an oily little jerk who talked oddly and did odd things."

Offie's value both in occupied Europe and in the CIA related in part to his ability to establish friendly relations with the wives of prominent officials. His European connections helped him later in aiding the movement of Nazis in and out of Eastern Europe. He ran two key programs: Operation Paperclip, which recruited German scientists for work in the United States, and Operation Bloodstone, which targeted the Soviet Union by making intelligence analysts or spies of former Nazis and Nazi collaborators. He "helped to establish the paradigm for harnessing the services of Nazis, fascists, and collaborators, and a variety of emigre groups and desperate volunteers from the DP [displaced persons] camps in America's fight against the specter of world communism." From Germany he recruited former diplomats and military officers to help spy on and support American propaganda efforts against the Soviets, a program codenamed Operation Bloodstone. Like others in the CIA at the time, he ignored the Nazi past of some of them, including such notables as Gustav Hilger, who had links to the creation of the SS Einsatzgruppen massacre squads, and Nicholas Poppe, a Russian linguist and Nazi collaborator who helped plan the extermination of the Jews. His other responsibilities included the oversight of labor and émigré affairs, as well as the National Committee for Free Europe, parent of Radio Free Europe, which began radio broadcasts into Czechoslovakia in 1950 using a transmitter Offie borrowed from the U.S. Army.

In October 1949 Offie made sexual advances in his OPC office while meeting with another government employee, an agent in the Army Counterintelligence Corps, who filed a report of the incident. Instead of a confrontation with Offie and his superiors, CIA security staff or enemies within the OPC accomplished his removal in a roundabout way. Early in 1950, they leaked information about Offie's 1943 arrest to Senator Joseph McCarthy. When McCarthy testified on March 18 before a subcommittee of the Senate Foreign Relations Committee investigating his claims about Communists working for the government, he described the case of a "convicted homosexual" who had resigned from the State Department in 1948 and now held a "top-salaried important position" at the CIA. He raised the case again in the same setting on April 25, 1950, adding details about "the men's room in Lafayette Park," asking subcommittee chairman Senator Millard E. Tydings why he had not seen to the man's dismissal. That same afternoon, another subcommittee member, Senator Kenneth S. Wherry, a McCarthy supporter, announced that the employee in question had resigned.

Inside the CIA, Offie had defended himself as beyond blackmail, willing to admit his homosexuality, and Wisner defended him. CIA Director Roscoe Hillenkoetter yielded to Wisner until public disclosure seemed inevitable and he forced Offie's resignation in May 1950.

== Later career ==
In June 1950, Wisner arranged a less sensitive position for Offie at the Free Trade Union Committee (FTUC), a labor foreign policy group of the International Ladies' Garment Workers' Union secretly supported with CIA funding. He was greeted warmly by his superior, longtime labor activist Jay Lovestone. His title was Director of International Labor Information Services, but he served principally as liaison between the CIA and the FTUC, exploiting sources at his former employer to help his new colleagues understand and maneuver through the CIA's financing processes, though the relationship between the two organizations remained difficult.

Offie's contract at the FTUC ended in June 1952. He had developed detailed knowledge of the workings of the Mutual Security Administration, successor to the Marshall Plan, which managed purchases from European companies on behalf of the U.S. government. He used that expertise first as a consultant to a Washington law firm, while continuing to consult for the FTUC, and then to establish his own business, Global Enterprises.

In August 1953, Offie visited the Majorca home of Charles W. Thayer, a diplomat forced from the State Department as part of the Lavender Scare.

== Personal life ==
Historians agree that Offie was a homosexual, describing him variously as "open" or "flamboyant." John F. Kennedy referred to him as "La Belle Offlet" in 1939, suggesting his effeminacy was obvious. In a 1986 interview, a former OPC official dismissed the FBI's belief that Offie was a Soviet agent: "How could the Soviets blackmail him? Everyone in Washington knew he was a homosexual!"

In an interview with conservative columnist Westbrook Pegler at the end of 1952, Offie explained the 1943 Lafayette Park incident as an attempt to destroy him because of his long and vigorous anti-Communist record. He said he had a rendezvous there on State Department business and was accosted by a small gang. When he woke in a police cell he paid his $25 fine just to end the incident. J. Edgar Hoover's reaction to Offie's interview with Pegler was: "It seems to be an inherent part of a pervert's makeup to be also a pathological liar."

Ever since McCarthy's attacks highlighted Offie's homosexuality, Hoover's FBI had maintained a file on Offie and occasionally kept him under surveillance. Two of his professional contacts were also highly suspect in Hoover's eyes, Bullitt who had once been pro-Soviet though he had changed his mind decades earlier, and Lovestone, a former Communist turned labor activist which Hoover did not recognize as a fundamental change of ideology. At one point, Offie had to defend himself to FBI agents and explain how, while working as a private citizen, he knew details of the government's planned procurements in Italy for 1953. He explained his source, but Hoover remained personally interested in his case.

Offie died on June 18, 1972, when he took British European Airways Flight 548 that crashed near Staines soon after take-off from London Heathrow Airport, killing him and all other 117 people onboard. He is buried in Washington's Rock Creek Cemetery.

== Sources ==
- Mark Aarons and John Loftus, Unholy Trinity: The Vatican, the Nazis, and Soviet Intelligence (NY: St. Martin's Press, 1991)
- Will Brownell and Richard N. Billings, So Close to Greatness: A Biography of William C. Bullitt (NY: Macmillan Publishing, 1987)
- Scott Anderson, The Quiet Americans: Four CIA Spies at the Dawn of the Cold War–A Tragedy in Three Acts (NY: Doubleday, 2020)
- Robert Dallek, An Unfinished Life: John F. Kennedy, 1917-1963 (Boston: Little Brown, 2003)
- Robert D. Dean, Imperial Brotherhood: Gender and the Making of Cold War Foreign Policy (University of Massachusetts Press, 2001)
- Sigmund Diamond, Compromised Campus: The Collaboration of Universities with the Intelligence Community, 1945-1955 (NY: Oxford University Press, 1992)
- André Gerolymatos, Castles Made of Sand: A Century of Anglo-American Espionage and Intervention in the Middle East (Thomas Dunne, 2010)
- Nigel Hamilton, JFK: Reckless Youth (NY: Random House, 1992)
- Burton Hersh, The Old Boys: The American Elite and the Origins of the CIA (NY: Charles Scribner's Sons, 1992)
- David K. Johnson, The Lavender Scare: The Cold War Persecution of Gays and Lesbians in the Federal Government (University of Chicago Press, 2004)
- Ted Morgan, A Covert Life: Jay Lovestone, Communist, Anti-communist, and Spymaster (NY: Random House, 1999)
- Geoffrey Perret, Jack: A Life Like No Other (NY: Random House, 2002)
- Thomas Powers, The Man who Kept the Secrets (NY: Knopf, 1979)
- Mark Riebling, Wedge: From Pearl Harbor to 9/11: How the Secret War between the FBI and CIA has Endangered National Security (NY: Touchstone, 1994)
- Evan Thomas, The Very Best Men, Four who Dared: The Early Years of the CIA (NY: Simon & Schuster, 1995)
- Tim Weiner, Legacy of Ashes: A History of the CIA (NY: Doubleday, 2007))
- Benjamin Welles, Sumner Welles: FDR's Global Strategist, A Biography (NY: St. Martin's Press, 1997)
- Hugh Wilford, The Mighty Wurlitzer: How the CIA Played America (Cambridge: Harvard University Press, 2009)
