= Alexandre Hébert =

French activist, anarchist, and trade unionist

Alexandre Hébert (4 March 1921, Alvimare, Seine-Maritime - 16 January 2010), was a French activist, anarchist and trade unionist. He had a pivotal role in the accession of anarchists to the French trade-unions congress Workers' Force (CGT-FO).

== Career ==
He became secretary of the departmental union of Loire Atlantique, from its inception, along with Raymond Patoux, secretary of the departmental union of Maine et Loire. He played an important role in the accession to these unions of militants of the autonomous Fédération de l'Education Nationale in 1982, 1983 and 1984.

Its activities of militant trade unionism were permanently in the style set out by Fernand Pelloutier in the letter to his anarchist friends Lettre aux anarchistes in 1899. He continued to fight against all the followers (official and unofficial) of trade unionism who were subservient to political parties, Christian trade unionism, autonomous trade unionism, partisan trade unionism, and all varieties of company sponsored or integrated trade unionism. He separated himself from some of his anarchist fellows who took other ways, including aligning with Christian trade unionism.

As a militant anarchist, he helped reconstruct the anarchist movement after the second world war, through the Fédération anarchiste; in 1954, he helped reconstruct the Fédération anarchist destroyed by the Leninist action of Georges Fontenis. In 1961, he contributed the Groupe Fernand Pelloutier to the publication of the news bulletin L'Anarcho-syndicaliste, prelude to the constitution of the Union des anarcho-syndicalistes.

He tried to organize the activist workers anxious to preserve the independence of trade unions; a friend of Pierre Boussel alias Pierre Lambert, he helped the abandonment by the members of his Trotskyist party of the Marxist–Leninist-Trotskyist idea of the need to link the unions to the "revolutionary party". He was a free-thinker, secular activist, and rationalist. He took part in the initiative of the l'Appel aux laïque against the policy concerning the public schools and the institutions of the Republic followed by President François Mitterrand.
