= Jean-Claude Mailly =

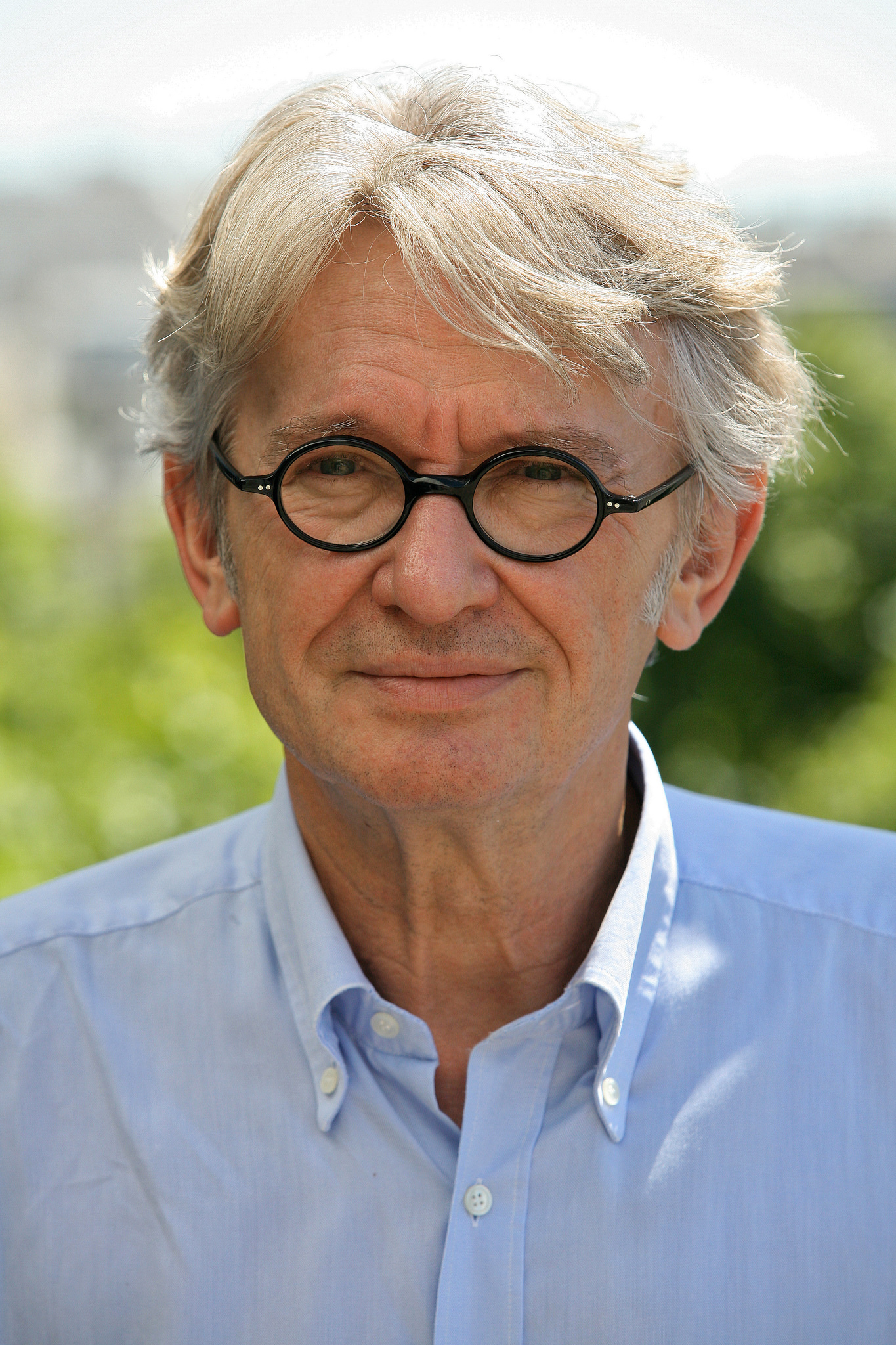
- Mailly in 2015

General Secretary of Workers' Force
- In office 7 February 2004 – 27 April 2018
- Preceded by: Marc Blondel
- Succeeded by: Pascal Pavageau

Personal details
- Born: 12 March 1953 (age 73) Béthune, France

Jean-Claude Mailly (born 12 March 1953) is a French former trade union leader.

Born in Béthune, Mailly grew up in Lens, then studied economic science in Lille. He found work with the National Health Insurance Fund. In 1974, he met Marc Blondel, a prominent figure Workers' Force (FO), a trade union confederation. Mailly's father was already an activist in FO, and Mailly decided to also join the union.

In 1981, on Blondel's invitation, Mailly began working full-time for FO, in its federal office. In time, he came to lead FO policy on economic issues, serving on the secretariat from 1989, and then was elected national secretary in 2000. In February 2004, he succeeded Blondel as general secretary of FO. Initially, Mailly's critics claimed that he relied on the support of the Trotskyist Workers' Party, although this proved not to be the case. He started by meeting the leaders of the other main national union federations, breaking with FO tradition, and campaigned alongside them in protests against a new hiring contract in 2005. Initially, he was able unite the large majority of the union, but from 2016 he was more controversial, working closely with the General Confederation of Labour in opposing the El Khomri law, then refusing to organise opposition to Emmanuel Macron, against the wishes of the majority of the union.

Mailly retired in 2018, reaching the age of 65. His final activity report only very narrowly winning the approval of a majority of members. His successor, Pascal Pavageau, published details of Mailly's salary and expenses, which proved controversially high.

Following his retirement, Mailly formed the company JCBC Conseil, to advise on social, economic and industrial matters.

Trade union offices
Preceded by Marc Blondel	General Secretary of Workers' Force; 2004–2018	Succeeded by Pascal Pavageau
