= Federation of Employees and Managers =

Trade union of France

The Federation of Employees and Managers (French: Fédération des employés et cadres, FEC) is a trade union representing white-collar workers in France.

The federation was established on 13 July 1893 as the National Federation of Employees, and was a founding element of the General Confederation of Labour (CGT) in 1895. It lost some members when the United General Confederation of Labour split away from the CGT, but they rejoined in 1935.

Under the leadership of Oreste Capocci, the union opposed the Vichy government, and was banned, but continued to organise illegally and was reconstituted on the liberation of France. In 1947, it voted to leave the CGT, objecting to the influence of the French Communist Party, and it became a founding element of Workers' Force.

By 1995, the union had 36,500 members. As of 2020, it has 11 sections:

- Agricultural Organisations
- Casinos and Gaming
- Clerks and Notaries
- Commerce
- Credit
- Insurance
- Miscellaneous
- Press, Publishing and Advertising
- Services
- Shipping Companies
- Social Organisations

== General Secretaries ==
1893: André Gély
1894: Coulon
1895: Victor Dalle
1896: Sapience
1897: Arthur Rozier
1909: Paul Aubriot
1919: Léopold Faure
1920: Georges Buisson
1929: Oreste Capocci
1950: Adolphe Sidro
1965: Marius Allègre
1974: Marc Blondel
1980: André Montagne
1984: Yves Simon
1993: Rose Boutaric
2007: Serge Legagnoa
2018: Sébastien Busiris
