= Georges Buisson =

French trade union leader

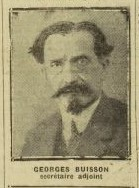
Buisson in 1936

George Louis Hubert Buisson (2 December 1878 – 31 January 1946) was a French trade union leader and Resistance activist.

== Biography ==
Born in Évreux, Buisson worked in a shop there, then moved to Rouen and in 1898 to Paris, where he worked in a haberdashery. He joined the Federation of Employees (FEC) in 1901, and also joined the French Socialist Party. However, in 1905, when it merged into the French Section of the Workers' International (SFIO), he did not join, instead contesting local elections as an independent socialist.

In 1908, Buisson was elected as assistant secretary of the FEC, becoming treasurer in 1910, and administrative secretary in 1914. It was affiliated to the General Confederation of Labour (CGT), and Buisson undertook much for the CGT, including co-ordinating the creation of the National Federation of Lighting Workers.

During World War I, Buisson served in the infantry, then he returned to trade unionism, and in 1920 became general secretary of the FEC, which came with a seat on the administrative commission of the CGT. In 1921, he became vice president of the International Federation of Employees, Technicians and Managers. He remained with the CGT when the communists split away, and from 1925 served on the National Economic Council. In 1926, he married Suzanne Lévy, a prominent figure in the SFIO, and subsequently he joined the party himself.

In 1929, Buisson stood down as general secretary of the FEC to work full-time for the CGT, in charge of propaganda, serving until 1939, when the CGT was banned. He was active in the French Resistance, as was Suzanne. She was caught by the Gestapo and later killed, while George fled to London. There, he worked with Charles de Gaulle and became a delegate to the Government of Algiers. In August 1943, he was made a CGT delegate to the Consultative Assembly, the first person to speak at it, and its vice president. Following the liberation of France, he returned to Paris, and served again in the leadership of the CGT until his death in 1946.

Trade union offices
Preceded by Léopold Faure	General Secretary of the Federation of Employees; 1920–1929	Succeeded by Oreste Capocci
