= Marc Blondel =

French trade union leader (1938–2014)

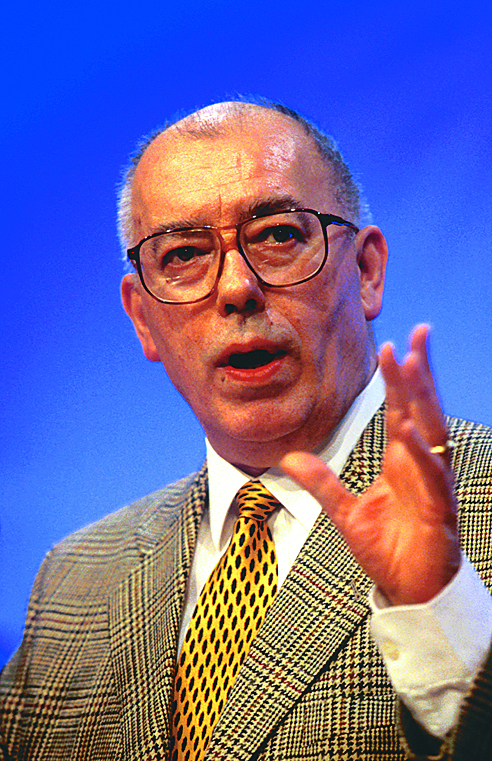
- Marc Blondel in 2000

General Secretary of Workers' Force
- In office 1989–2004
- Preceded by: André Bergeron
- Succeeded by: Jean-Claude Mailly

Personal details
- Born: 2 May 1938 Courbevoie, France
- Died: 16 March 2014 (aged 75) Paris, France

Marc Fiacre Henri Blondel (2 May 1938 – 16 March 2014) was a French trade union leader.

Born in Courbevoie, Blondel grew up with his mother in Hénin-Liétard, while his father was active in the French Resistance. After the war, the family reunited in Paris, and Blondel went to secondary school in Nanterre, where he joined the Socialist Youth. He then went to study law while taking various part-time jobs, and one of these led him to join the Trade Union Federation of PTT Workers, part of Workers' Force (FO).

Blondel campaigned for Algerian independence, and this led him to join the Autonomous Socialist Party. However, he disagreed with its merger into the Unified Socialist Party and so left political activity. Instead, he became active in the Grand Orient de France, becoming prominent in left-wing freemasonry.

In 1960, Blondel began working for ASSEDIC, where he formed a network of union branches. This success led him to become secretary of the union representing workers in social organisations in the Paris region, and from 1961, he served on the executive of the Federation of Employees and Managers (FEC), and then its national secretary in 1965. He began advocating a merger between FO, the General Confederation of Labour (CGT), and the French Democratic Confederation of Labour (CFDT). This was not popular with the FO leadership, but Blondel continued to rise in prominence, being active in May 1968 movement, and in 1974 winning election as the general secretary of the FEC.

In 1980, Blondel moved to work at the national office of FO, leading on economic issues, and in 1981 he was elected to the governing body of the International Labour Organization. In 1989, he was elected as general secretary of FO, narrowly beating Jean-Claude Pitous, and becoming the first leader of FO not to have been part of its 1948 split from the CGT. His victory was owed in part to the support of the Trotskyist Workers' Party, and this led him to face inaccurate accusations of being a Trotskyist himself.

Under Blondel's leadership, the FO adopted more radical policies, but faced falling membership. In 1995, it worked with the CGT to campaign against Alain Juppé's plan to reorganise social security. He symbolically shook hands with the CGT leader, Louis Viannet. He was consistently re-elected with large majorities, until he retired in 2004. He then became president of the National Federation of Free Thought, the Friends of Fred Zeller, and the Friends of Léon Jouhaux.

Trade union offices
Preceded by Marius Allègre	General Secretary of the Federation of Employees and Managers; 1974–1980	Succeeded by André Montagne
Preceded by André Bergeron	General Secretary of Workers' Force; 1989–2004	Succeeded by Jean-Claude Mailly
