= Book Federation =

Trade union of France

The Book Federation (French: Fédération du Livre) is a trade union representing workers in the printing industry in France.

The union was founded in September 1949 by printing industry workers who supported Workers' Force (FO). The industry was dominated by the French Federation of Book Workers, the equivalent General Confederation of Labour-affiliated union, which had closed shop agreements in many workplaces, and the Book Federation struggled to recruit members.

The union was initially led by André Bergeron, but he had a number of other roles, and it was effectively run by Pierre Magnier, who became its second leader.

== General Secretaries ==
1949: André Bergeron
1963: Pierre Magnier
1968: Gaston du Bois
1977: Roger Carpentier
2001: Patrice Sacquepee
