= Molchad (river) =

River in Belarus

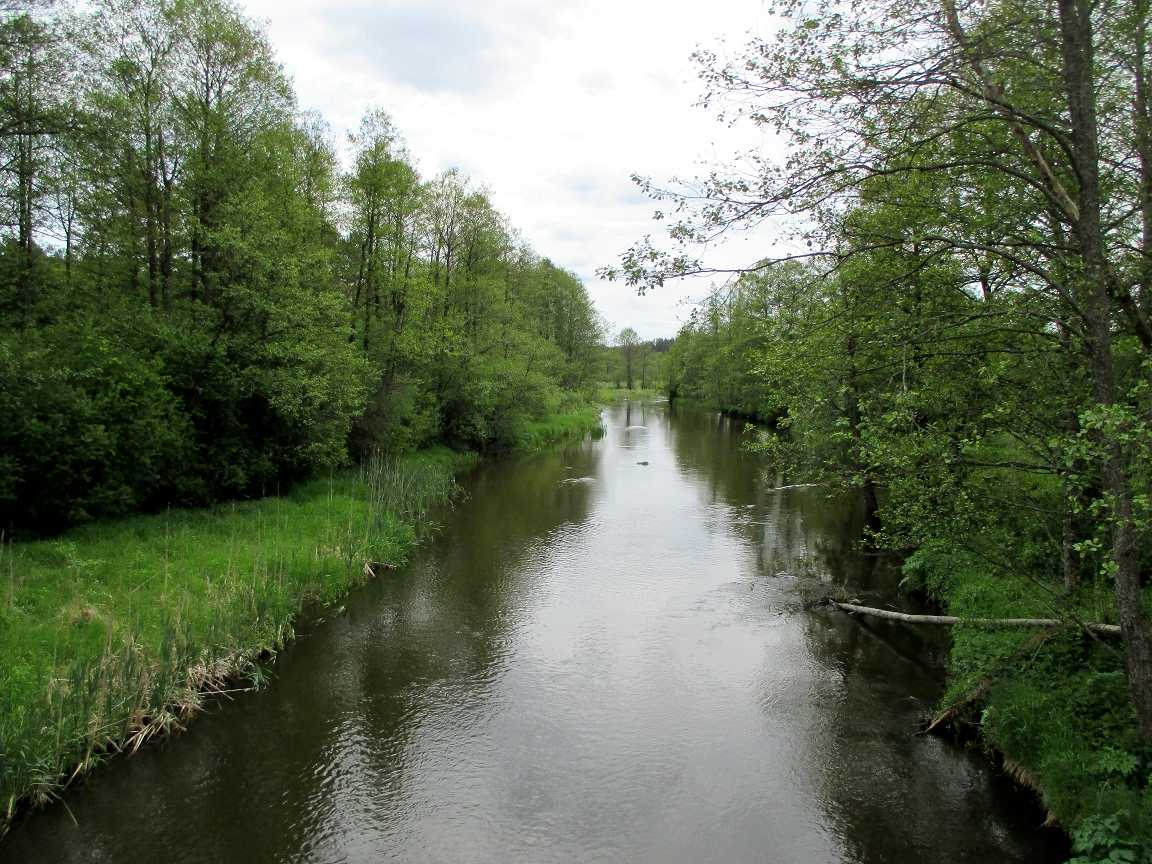

Location
- Country: Belarus

Physical characteristics
- Mouth: Neman
  - coordinates: 53°38′12″N 25°19′08″E
- Length: 98 km (61 mi)
- Basin size: 1,440 km^{2} (560 sq mi)

Basin features
- Progression: Neman→ Baltic Sea

The Molchad (Belarusian: Моўчадзь; Russian: Молчадь) is a river in Belarus, a left tributary of the Neman. The 98 km (61 mi) long river originates in Baranavichy District, Brest Region. It then flows north through Dzyatlava District in Grodno Region, passing through the localities of Molchad and Hiezhaly.

For a long time, the Molchad formed the border between Navahrudak and Slonim powiats in Nowogródek Voivodeship.
