= FO Construction =

Trade union of France

FO Construction is a trade union representing construction workers, and those in related industries, in France.

The union was established in 1948 as the Federation of Building and Wood. While the General Confederation of Labour (CGT) suffered a major split that year, forming Workers' Force (FO), most of the CGT's National Federation of Workers in the Building Industries remained loyal, and only a small minority left to form the new union, led by Louis Fréour.

Within the first couple of years, the FO's Federation of Paper and Cardboard merged into the union, then in 1956, the Ceramics Federation also joined, the union adopting the lengthy name, the National Federation of Building, Wood, Paper, Cardboard and Ceramics.

By 1995, the union claimed 15,000 members, and was named the Federation of Building, Public Works, Wood, Paper, Ceramic, Quarries and Construction Materials. It later shortened its name to "FO Construction".
