= National Federation of State Workers =

Trade union of France

The National Federation of State Workers (French: Fédération nationale des travailleurs de l'Etat, FNTE) is a trade union representing civil servants in France.

The union was founded in 1922 and affiliated to the General Confederation of Labour (CGT). Initially, it represented workers in arsenals, navy yards and similar institutions. It claimed 119,000 members in 1936, and although it was banned during World War II, it reformed after the war, and in 1946 it had 150,000 members. In the late 1940s, a minority left to form the Federation of General Administration.

Despite its name, the union does not organise all civil servants, as some departments have their own unions, but it covers the Ministry of Defence, and various government agencies. By 1994, it had 14,391 members.
