= Free Trade Union Committee =

Anti-communist labor organization

The Free Trade Union Committee (FTUC) was created by the American Federation of Labor (AFL)

== History ==
At its 1944 convention in New Orleans, the AFL passed a resolution drafted by Jay Lovestone creating the FTUC. Lovestone became its executive secretary. Its mission was to assist trade unions in foreign countries, especially to help them remain independent of Communist influence. Its original funding was one million dollars. The organization backed "free unions founded on collective bargaining in an open marketplace, and opposition to state-run unions on the Soviet model." The leadership of the AFL anticipated that Communists in each European country would have the backing of the Russian state and its propaganda in their efforts to dominate each nation's labor movement. The Americans thought Eastern Europe was probably lost to their movement, but many others needed their assistance, including Greece, Italy, and Turkey. Non-communist but statist regimes like Spain and later Argentina presented opportunities as well. Initially their organizational counterpart was the World Federation of Trade Unions, which the AFL's rival, the Congress of Industrial Organizations (CIO), joined and which, it later transpired, the Soviets financed.

The FTUC helped rebuild the shattered trade union movement in Europe and Japan. It sent food packages to destitute labor activists and union leaders. In addition to relief activities, it financed a trade school in Palermo.

The FTUC helped fund the Force Ouvrière in France in opposition to the Communist-controlled labor confederation in 1948.

David Dubinsky claimed in his memoirs that the FTUC resisted attempts by the CIA to control its operations, but the CIA's role was substantial. The CIA channeled funds to the FTUC for 20 years, beginning with efforts to influence the Italian elections in 1948. Even in meetings with their CIA counterparts, FTUC officials inflated their budgets to minimize the CIA's relative contribution. Dubinsky had misgivings throughout and the FTUC managed to maintain a certain independence and fought for less CIA control over their activities.

== See also ==
- American Institute for Free Labor Development
- American Center for International Labor Solidarity
- Carmel Offie
- International Confederation of Free Trade Unions

== Sources ==
- Anthony Carew, "The American Labor Movement in Fizzland: The Free Trade Union Committee and the CIA" in Labor History, February 1998
- Ted Morgan, A Covert Life: Jay Lovestone, Communist, Anti-communist, and Spymaster (NY: Random House, 1999)
- Robert D. Parmet, The Master of Seventh Avenue: David Dubinsky and the American Labor Movement (NY: New York University Press, 2005)
