= FO Metals =

Trade union of France

FO Metals (French: FO Metaux), is a trade union representing metalworkers in France, and those in related trades such as electrical and aerospace workers.

The union was established in April 1948, as the Confederal Federation of Metalworkers. Its founders were former members of the General Confederation of Labour-affiliated Metalworkers' Federation who objected to the influence of the French Communist Party in their union, and wished to affiliate to Workers' Force.

By 1995, the union had 25,000 members.
