= Suarce =

- Commune
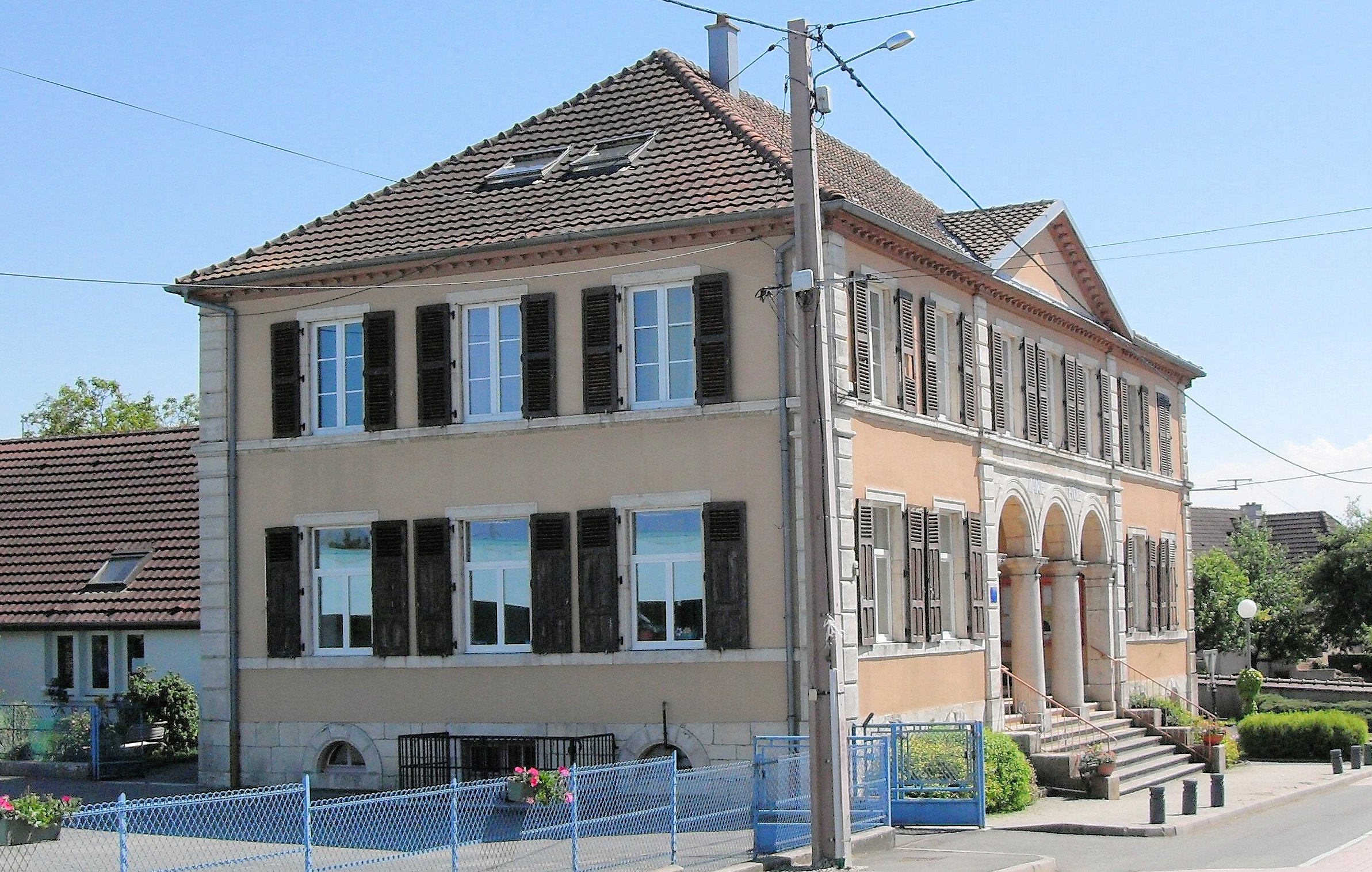
- Town hall

- Coat of arms
- Location of Suarce
- Location within France Location within Bourgogne-Franche-Comté
- Coordinates: 47°33′50″N 7°04′53″E
- Country: France
- Region: Bourgogne-Franche-Comté
- Department: Territoire de Belfort
- Arrondissement: Belfort
- Canton: Grandvillars
- Intercommunality: Sud Territoire

Government
  - Mayor (2020–2026): Patrice Dumortier
- Area^{1}: 11.81 km^{2} (4.56 sq mi)
- Highest elevation: 407 m (1,335 ft)
- Lowest elevation: 370 m (1,210 ft)
- Population (2023): 442
  - Density: 37.4/km^{2} (96.9/sq mi)
- Time zone: UTC+01:00 (CET)
  - Summer (DST): UTC+02:00 (CEST)
- INSEE/Postal code: 90095 /90100
- ^{1} French Land Register data, which excludes lakes, ponds, glaciers > 1 km^{2} (0.386 sq mi or 247 acres) and river estuaries.

Suarce (French pronunciation: [sɥaʁs]) is a commune in the Territoire de Belfort department in Bourgogne-Franche-Comté in northeastern France.

== See also ==
- Communes of the Territoire de Belfort department
