= National Federation of Education, Culture and Vocational Training =

Trade union of France

The National Federation of Education, Culture and Vocational Training (French: Fédération nationale de l'enseignement, de la culture et de la formation professionnelle, FNEC FP) is a trade union representing education and related staff in France.

In 1948, the General Confederation of Labour (CGT) suffered a major split, with many members leaving to form Workers' Force (FO). The Federation for National Education (FEN), formerly affiliated to the CGT, voted to leave, but did not join FO. However, it permitted its members to also be affiliated to any national union federation. As a result, in April, supporters of FO formed the FO Federation for National Education. Membership remained low, only 5,000 in 1950, and in 1954, FO decided to ban dual membership with the FEN, effectively ending the union's presence outside teaching colleges and technical education.

The union became the National Federation for Education and Culture (FNEC) in 1970, and grew significantly in the early 1980s, when a group of former FEN members joined, arguing that the FEN was not supporting secularism nor opposing parents interfering in state education. The union adopted its current name in 1989. By 1995, it claimed 28,000 members.

== General Secretaries ==
1948: Francis Perrin, Gilbert Walusinski and Gaston Pollet
1950: Pierre Giraud
1953: Pierre Galoni
1968: Maurice Mascrier
1983:
1986: François Chaintron
2008: Hubert Raguin
2019: Clément Poullet
