= Molchad =

Village in Brest Region, Belarus

Molchad Моўчадзь (Belarusian)
- Village
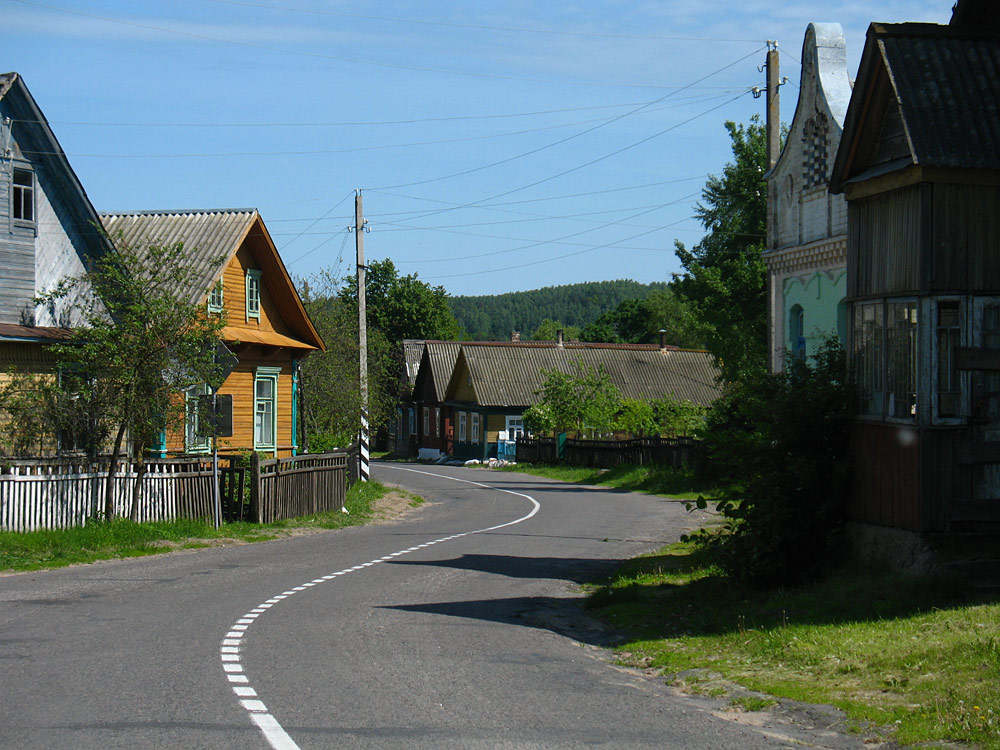
- A street in 2010

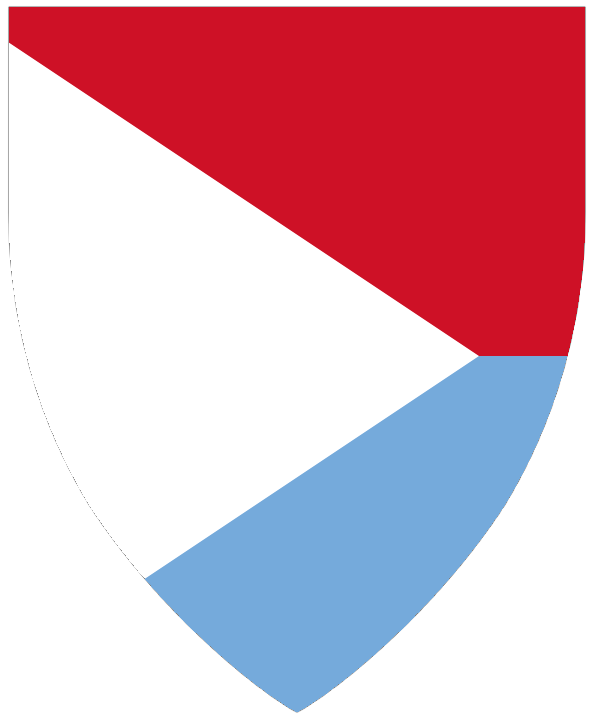
- Flag Coat of arms

- Location in Belarus
- Coordinates: 53°18.44′N 25°42.02′E
- Country: Belarus
- Region: Brest Region
- District: Baranavichy District
- First mentioned: 1486
- Elevation: 193 m (633 ft)

Population (2005)
  - Total: 950
- Time zone: UTC+3 (MSK)
- Postal code: 225340
- Area code: 375 163
- Vehicle registration: 1

Molchad or Mowchadz (Belarusian: Моўчадзь, romanized: Moŭčadź; Russian: Молчадь; Polish: Mołczadź; Yiddish: מייטשעט, romanized: Meytshet) is a village in Baranavichy District, Brest Region, Belarus. It is situated on the Molchad River and 33 kilometres (21 mi) north-west from Baranavichy. In 2005, the population of Molchad was 950 and included 330 households.

== History ==
The village of Molchad has appeared in written sources as early as 1486 with the founding of the local Holy Trinity Church, which no longer stands, listed as part of the Slonim povet of the Grand Duchy of Lithuania. During the Russo-Polish War in 1654 the village was razed by Russian invaders but later rebuilt.

=== Under the Russian Empire ===
As a result of the third partition of Poland in 1795 Molchad became part of the Russian Empire. In 1879, the village suffered a large fire which destroyed most of its buildings. In 1880, the St. Peter and Paul Church was completed. In 1884 a railway was built through the village connecting it to the nearby city of Brest. In 1886 Molchad was reported to have 2 churches, 3 synagogues, a brewery, a railway station, a school and a bazaar.

=== 20th century ===
In 1921, the Peace of Riga transferred Molchad to Poland. Following the Invasion of Poland in 1939, Molchad was incorporated into the Byelorussian SSR. Between June 1941 and July 1944, Molchad was occupied by Nazi Germany and a ghetto was established there. From June through August 1942, 3,600 Jews from Molchad and the surrounding area were massacred by the native Polish population with the support of German troops. Many Jews were buried alive.

== Demographics ==
=== Population ===
- In 1830, the population was 363 people: 183 were Jewish, 169 were middle class Christians and farmers, 6 were gentry, 2 clergy and 3 poor.
- In 1865, the population was 737.
- In 1886, the population was 479.
- In 1921, the population was 1483.
- In 1998, the population was 882.

== Gallery ==
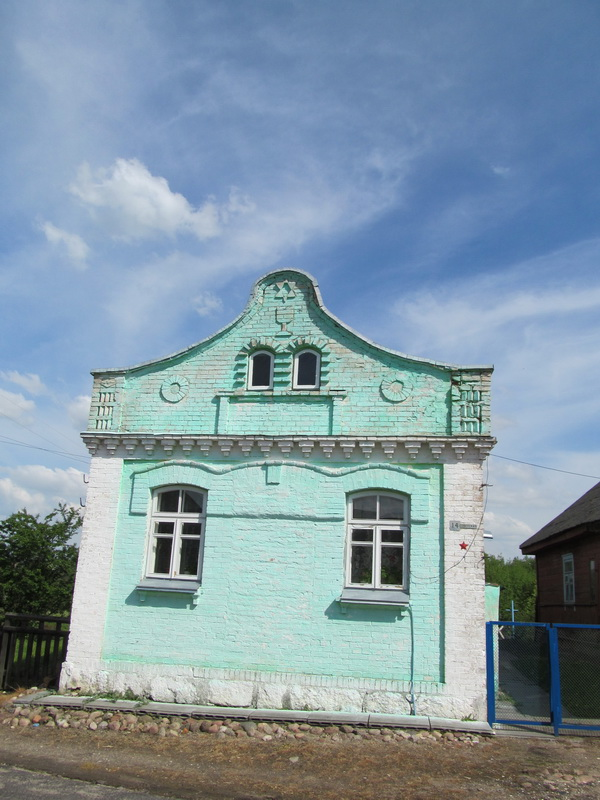
An old Jewish tavern

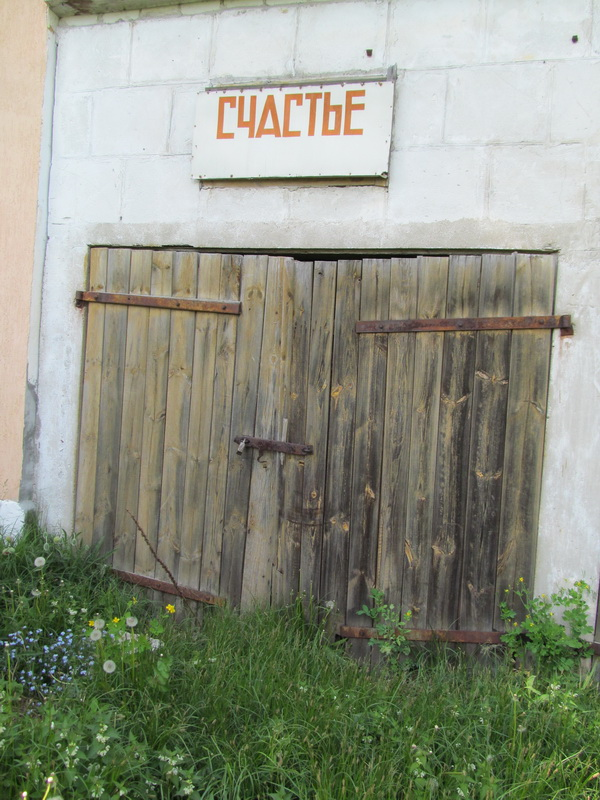
At the back of the tavern, one can find HAPPINESS

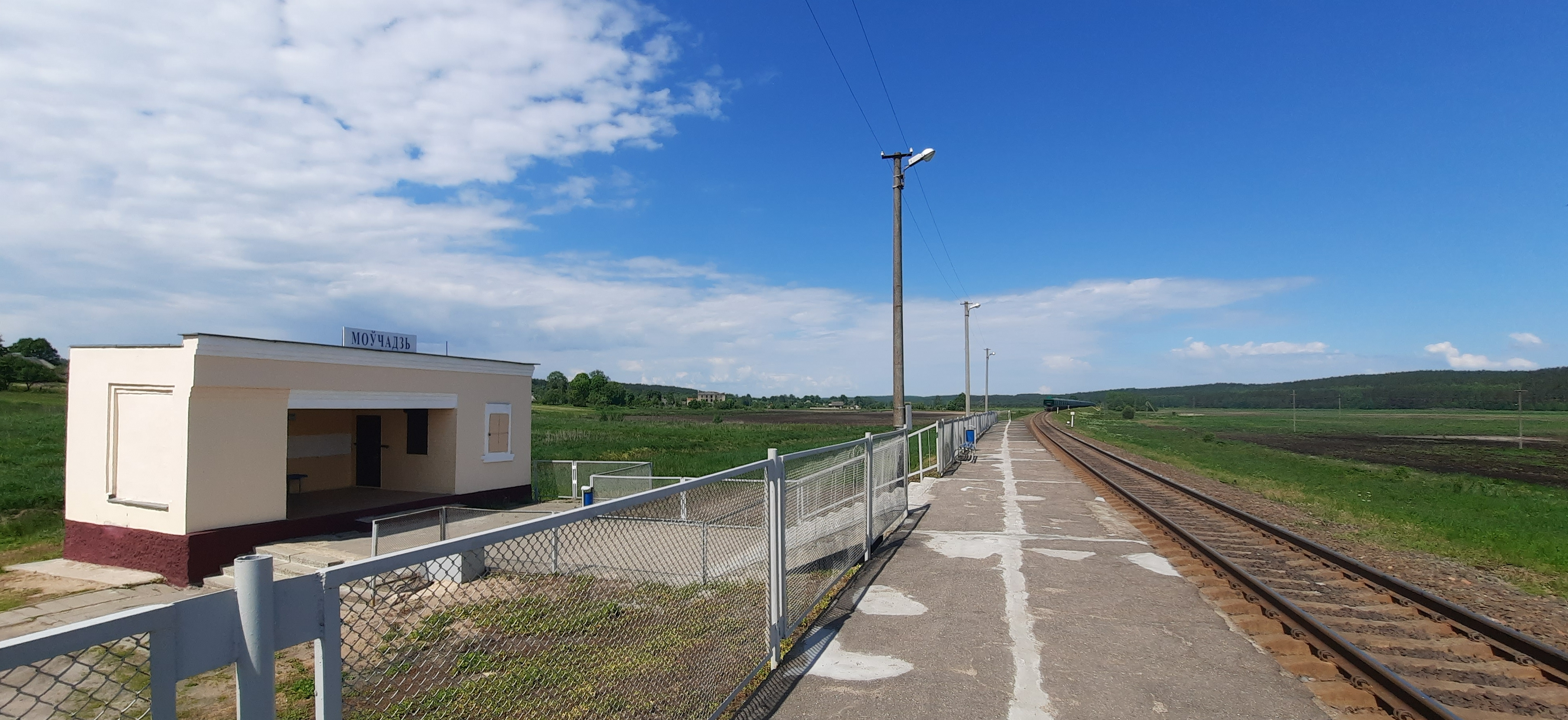
The train station, on the Baranavichy-Lida railway.
