= Finance Federation (France) =

Trade union of France

The Finance Federation (French: Fédération des finances) is a trade union representing workers at the Ministry of the Economy and Finance in France.

The federation was created in 1930, on the initiative of the General Federation of Civil Servants (FGF). It affiliated to the FGF and also to the General Confederation of Labour (CGT). It claimed 55,000 members in 1937, and although it was banned during World War II, it reformed after the war, and in 1946 had 40,000 members.

The union lost much of its membership in 1947, when the rival FO Finance Federation was created, but remained strong in the customs service. It has since grown across the department, to have the largest membership based there of any union. As of 1994, it had 14,871 members.
