= Robert Bothereau =

French labor union leader (1901–1985)

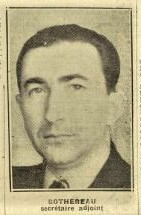
One of the eight members of the Confederation office of the CGT, elected after the Toulouse congress, March 1936

Robert Eugène Amilcar Bothereau (22 February 1901 - 31 May 1985) was a French trade union leader. He was the secretary general of Workers' Force from 1948 to 1963.

== Biography ==
Born in Baule, Bothereau worked on the family's vineyard while his father fought in World War I, then completed an apprenticeship as a car mechanic. He joined the Metalworkers' Federation, an affiliate of the General Confederation of Labour (CGT). He undertook his compulsory military service in Orleans, then afterwards remained there, working as a car mechanic. As he was employed by the government, he joined the local union of state workers, soon becoming its deputy secretary, and also serving on the committee of the Orleans trades council. He began to do much work for the departmental CGT union, and in 1929, was elected as its secretary.

CGT membership in the department grew under Bothereau, and his skills were recognised by CGT leader Léon Jouhaux. in 1933, he was appointed to the CGT executive, where he worked closely with Jouhaux, his responsibilities including labour issues, relationships with the departmental unions, and publication of La Voix du Peuple.

Bothereau was called up at the start of World War II, but remained supportive of the CGT line, denouncing the Molotov–Ribbentrop Pact, and trying to maintain activity in spite of increasing government restrictions. In 1940, René Belin led a minority of the CGT into collaboration with the Vichy government, and Bothereau met with Belin against Jouhaux's advice, but ultimately decided to side with the resistance. In 1941, he secretly relocated to northern France, jointly leading the underground northern section of the CGT with Louis Saillant and Albert Gazier, while running the workshop at a training centre in Paris.

The CGT was established legally following the liberation of France, and Bothereau returned to its executive, resigning in 1947 and working with Jouhaux to form Workers' Force (FO), established in April 1948. Jouhaux opted to become president of FO, leaving the post of general secretary open to Bothereau. The federation remained fairly small under his leadership, priding itself on its independence from political parties, and its affiliation to the International Confederation of Free Trade Unions.

Bothereau retired in 1963, serving on the general council of the Bank of France, and from 1964 to 1967 was a Conseiller d'État. He then retired to Beaugency, where he was elected to the local council as an independent, becoming deputy mayor.

Trade union offices
Preceded by New position	General Secretary of Workers' Force; 1948–1965	Succeeded by André Bergeron
