= Fédération de l'Administration Générale de l'État =

Trade union of France

The Fédération de l'Administration Générale de l'État, FAGE (lit. 'Federation of General Administration of the State') is a trade union representing civil servants in France.

The union originated as a split from the National Federation of State Workers, an affiliate of the General Confederation of Labour, by those who objected to the influence of the French Communist Party. Although only a minority joined the new union, the Federation of General Administration, it included a majority of prefectural workers. In 1948, it affiliated to Workers' Force, and became a founding affiliate of its General Federation of Public Servants. In 1953, the small National Economic Federation merged into the union.

By 2002, the union claimed 30,000 members.
