= Solidarity Center =

Non-profit organization

- Solidarity Center
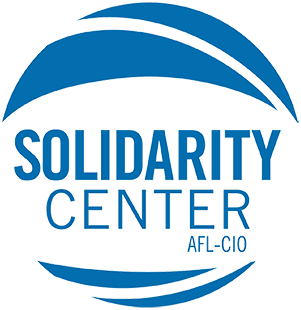
- Founded: 1997
- Headquarters: 888 16th Street NW, Suite 400, Washington, D.C. 20006; global field offices
- Location: United States
- Key people: Shawna Bader-Blau, Executive Director; Elizabeth Shuler (AFL-CIO President), Board of Trustees Chair
- Affiliations: AFL–CIO
- Website: solidaritycenter.org

The Solidarity Center is a global nonprofit organization dedicated to supporting workers worldwide. It promotes labor rights, safe workplaces, fair wages, and democratic union representation.

Its stated mission is to promote core labor rights and assist unions globally by helping workers realize their power to achieve fairness and avoid exploitation in the economy. The organization supports stable democracies through independent, democratic unions.

== History ==
The AFL-CIO established the Solidarity Center in 1997. The Solidarity Center was created through the consolidation of four labor institutes: the American Institute for Free Labor Development, the Asian-American Free Labor Institute, the African-American Labor Institute, and the Free Trade Union Institute. Harry Kamberis, a former member of the Asian-American Free Labor Institute, served as the organization's first director.

By 1998, the Solidarity Center had opened field offices in multiple countries across Africa, Asia, Latin America, and Eastern Europe. Operating in approximately 20 to 28 countries by the turn of the century, it focused on promoting core labor rights and assisting unions.

== Funding ==
More than 96 percent of its funding comes from the United States federal government, mostly through the National Endowment for Democracy. The NED distributes grants to four institutes, two associated with economic interests and two with political interests. The Solidarity Center is associated with labor. Previously, it was primarily funded by U.S. government grants, including those administered through the National Endowment for Democracy.

The Solidarity Center receives funding from private foundations as well.

== Field offices ==
As of December 2023, the Solidarity Center maintained an office in Washington, D.C. and field offices in 35 countries.
