= American Institute for Free Labor Development =

The American Institute for Free Labor Development (AIFLD) was established by the AFL–CIO in the Western Hemisphere in late 1961. It received funding from the US government, mostly through USAID (United States Agency for International Development). In the 1980s, it began receiving funds from the NED (National Endowment for Democracy), which is funded through the USAID budget of the U.S. State Department. In 1995, AIFLD was merged with three similar organizations into the American Center for International Labor Solidarity.

== American Center for International Labor Solidarity (1997) ==
In October 1995, John Sweeney succeeded Thomas R. Donahue as President of the AFL–CIO. Sweeney merged AIFLD with three other institutes to form the American Center for International Labor Solidarity. The archives of the merged center are available at the University of Maryland Special Collections and University Archives.

== See also ==
- Free Trade Union Committee
- International Confederation of Free Trade Unions
