= Jay Lovestone =

American activist (1897–1990)

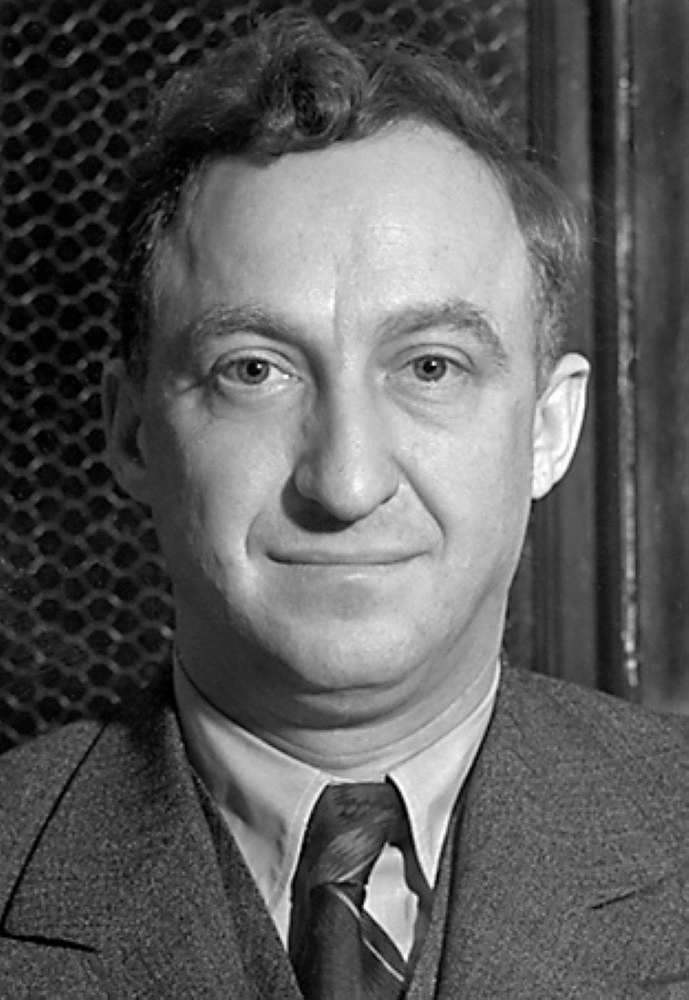
- Lovestone c. 1947

Chairman of the Communist Party USA (Note: Titled "Executive Secretary of the Workers (Communist) Party of America" until 1929.)
- In office March 1, 1927 – May 17, 1929
- Preceded by: C. E. Ruthenberg
- Succeeded by: William Z. Foster

Executive Secretary of the Communist Party of America
- In office February 22, 1922 – August 22, 1922
- Preceded by: William Weinstone
- Succeeded by: Abram Jakira

Personal details
- Born: Jacob Liebstein; December 15, 1897 Molchad, Grodno Governorate, Russian Empire
- Died: March 7, 1990 (aged 92) New York City, U.S.
- Party: Socialist (before 1919); Communist (1919–1929); Communist (Lovestoneites) (1929–1941)
- Other political affiliations: Workers (1921–1929)
- Domestic partner: Louise Page Morris
- Education: City College of New York
- Occupation: Political activist

Jay Lovestone (born Jacob Liebstein; Russian: Яков Либштейн; Yakov Libshtein; December 15, 1897 – March 7, 1990) was an American Communist activist and labor organizer. He was at various times a member of the Socialist Party of America, a leader of the Communist Party USA, leader of a small oppositionist party, and after becoming disenchanted with Stalinism became an anti-communist activist and Central Intelligence Agency (CIA) asset. Lovestone was also a foreign policy advisor to the leadership of the AFL–CIO and various unions within it.

== Biography ==
=== Background and early life ===
Lovestone was born into a Lithuanian Jewish family in a shtetl called Moǔchadz in Grodno Governorate (then part of the Russian Empire, now in Grodno Region, Belarus). His father, Barnet, had been a rabbi, but when he emigrated to America he had to settle for a job as shammes (caretaker). Barnet came first, then sent for his family the next year. Lovestone arrived with his mother, Emma, and his siblings, Morris, Esther and Sarah at Ellis Island on September 15, 1907. They originally settled on Hester Street in Manhattan's Lower East Side, but later moved to 2155 Daly Avenue in the Bronx. The family did not know their dates of birth precisely, but they assigned Jacob the date of December 15, 1897.

Young Liebstein was attracted to socialist politics from his teens. While imbibing all the ideological currents in the vibrant New York Yiddish and English radical press, he was particularly attracted to the ideas of Daniel De Leon. Although it is not known whether he ever joined de Leon's Socialist Labor Party, he was one of the 3,000 mourners who attended his funeral on May 11, 1914.

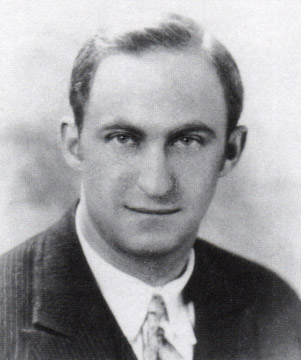
Lovestone c. 1918

Liebstein entered City College of New York in 1915. Already a member of the Socialist Party, he joined its unofficial student wing, the Intercollegiate Socialist Society. He became secretary and then president of the CCNY chapter. He also met William Weinstone and Bertram Wolfe in ISS, who would go on to become his factional allies in the Communist Party. He graduated in June 1918. In February 1919 he had his name legally changed to Jay Lovestone, the surname being a literal translation of Liebstein. (During the early 20th century such name changes were a common practice for Jewish immigrants who encountered widespread antisemitism in American society.) That year he also began studying at NYU Law School, but dropped out to pursue a career as a full-time Communist party member.

=== Communist years (1919–1929) ===
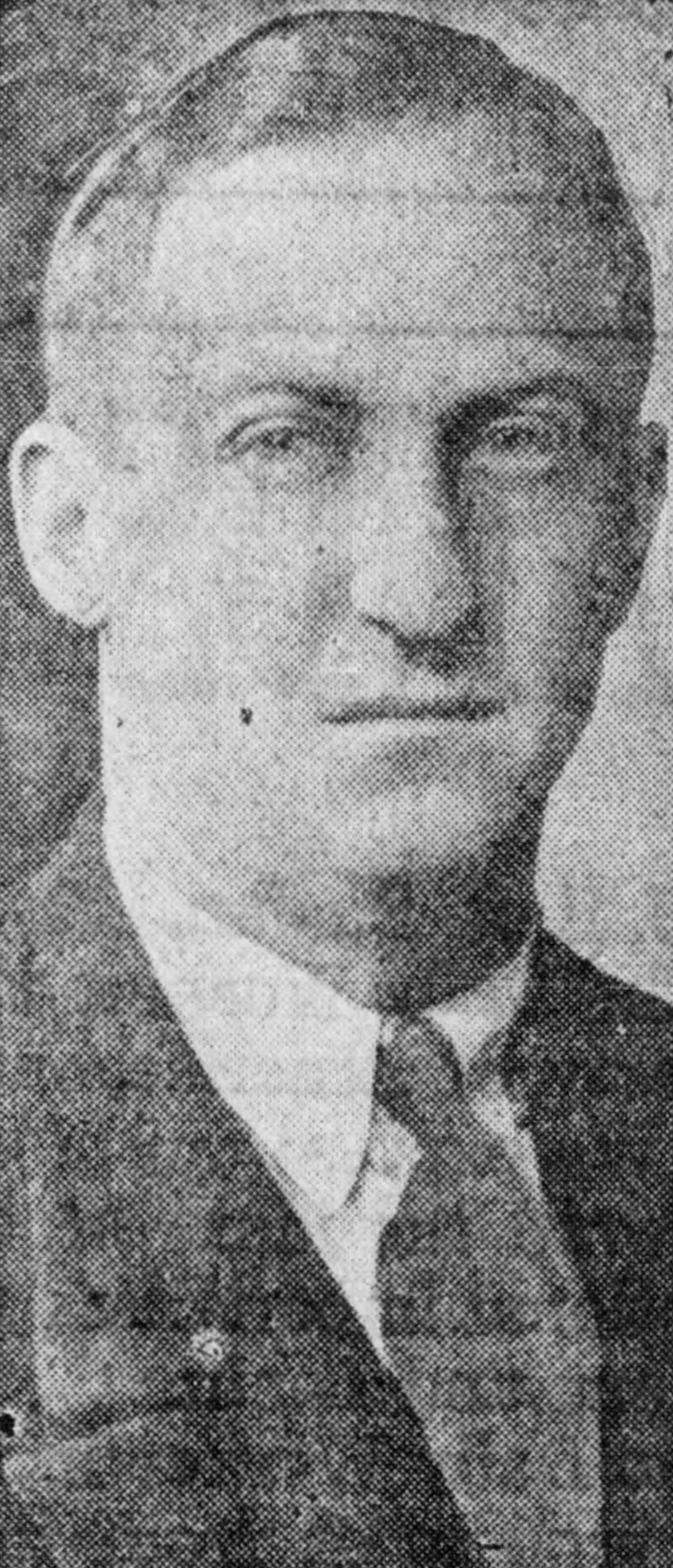
Lovestone c. 1928

His first foray into what would become the American Communist movement began in February 1919, when the left wing elements in the Socialist Party of New York began to organize themselves as a separate faction. Lovestone was on the original organizing committee, the Committee of 15, with Wolfe, John Reed and Benjamin Gitlow. That June he attended the National Conference of the Left Wing.

=== Communist opposition years (1929–1941) ===
When Stalin purged Bukharin from the Soviet Politburo in 1929, Lovestone suffered the consequences. A visiting delegation of the Comintern asked him to step down as party secretary in favor of his rival William Z. Foster. Lovestone refused and departed for the Soviet Union to argue his case. Lovestone insisted that he had the support of the vast majority of the Communist Party and should not have to step aside. Stalin responded that he "had a majority because the American Communist Party until now regarded you as the determined supporters of the Communist International. And it was only because the Party regarded you as friends of the Comintern that you had a majority in the ranks of the American Communist Party".

During the 1930s, he led an organisation known as the Lovestoneites, who were part of the Right Opposition.

=== Union and anti-Communist activities ===
Lovestone gives a speech at a union rally with David Dubinsky c. 1930s

According to Ted Morgan, in 1942, during World War II, Lovestone applied to the Office of Strategic Services (OSS), which was using allied communist networks in Europe to defeat Nazi Germany and the Axis powers. His application, however, was rejected by the OSS.

In 1944, during the height of the war, David Dubinsky arranged to place Lovestone in the AFL's Free Trade Union Committee, where he worked out of the ILGWU's headquarters. Along with Irving Brown he led the activities of the American Institute for Free Labor Development, an organization sponsored by the AFL which worked internationally, organizing free labor unions in Europe and Latin America which were not Communist-controlled.

After the creation of the Central Intelligence Agency in 1947, he cooperated closely with the new intelligence agency, feeding information about Communist labor-union activities to James Jesus Angleton, the CIA's counterintelligence chief, in order to undermine Communist influence in the international union movement and provide intelligence to the US government. He remained there until 1963 when he became director of the AFL–CIO's International Affairs Department (IAD), which quietly sent millions of dollars from the CIA to aid anti-communist activities internationally, particularly in Latin America.

Lovestone sat on the Board of Directors of the American Committee on United Europe, an organization founded in 1948 that promoted European federalism as a counterweight to communism. He was also a member of the anti-Castro organization, Citizens Committee for a Free Cuba, founded in 1963.

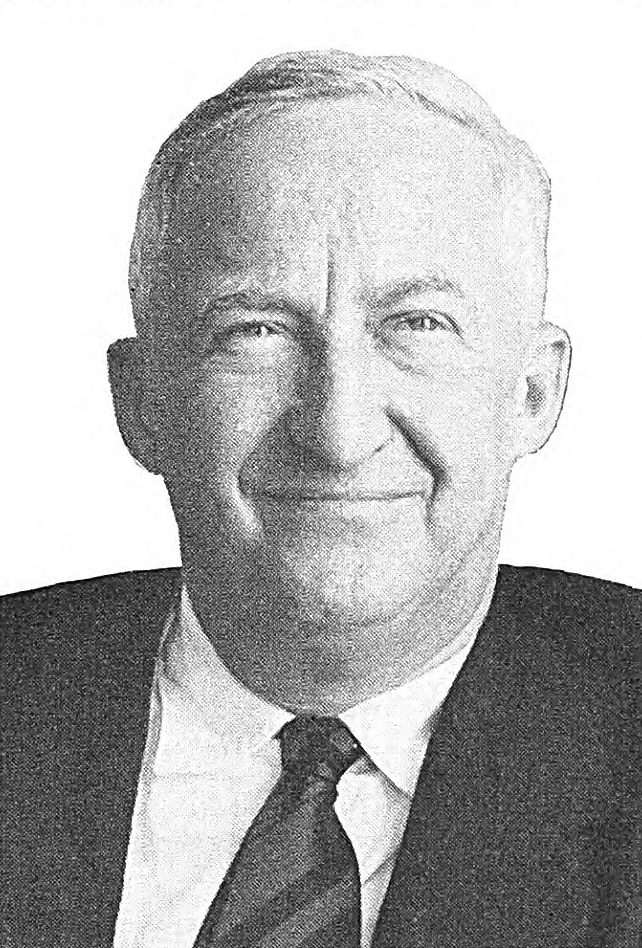
Lovestone c. 1956

In 1973, AFL–CIO president George Meany discovered that Lovestone was still in contact with Angleton of the CIA, who was conducting illegal domestic spying activities, despite being told seven years earlier to terminate this relationship. Meany chose to force Lovestone out by issuing an instruction with which he knew Lovestone would not comply. On March 6, 1974, he informed Lovestone that he wanted to close his New York office, stop publication of Free Trade Union News, and transfer Lovestone and his library and archives to Washington, D.C. When Lovestone argued he could not relocate his library of 6,000 books, he was dismissed, effective July 1. Lovestone's successor, Ernie Lee, maintained a low profile during his tenure from 1974 through 1982 and significantly scaled back the AFL–CIO's aggressive advocacy of a hawkish, anti-détente foreign policy.

Lovestone served on the Board of Directors of the Committee on the Present Danger, established in 1976.

=== Death and legacy ===
Lovestone died in Manhattan, New York on March 7, 1990, at the age of 92. Lovestone's papers, today encompassing more than 865 archival boxes, were acquired by the Hoover Institution Archives at Stanford University in 1975, where they remained sealed for 20 years. The material was opened to the public in 1995 and was a source for author Ted Morgan, who published the first full-length biography of Lovestone in 1999. An associate, Louise Page Morris, later supplemented the collection with her correspondence—according to other reports, Morris "spent 25 years as Lovestone's lover." Lovestone's Federal Bureau of Investigation file is reported to be 5,700 pages long.

== Bibliography ==
=== Communist Party years ===
- The Government — Strikebreaker: A Study of the Role of the Government in the Recent Industrial Crisis. New York: Workers Party of America, 1923.
- Blood and Steel: An Exposure of the 12-Hour Day in the Steel Industry. New York: Workers Party of America, n.d. [1923]
- What's What About Coolidge? Chicago, Workers Party of America, n.d. [c. 1923] alternate link
- The LaFollette Illusion: As Revealed in an Analysis of the Political Role of Senator Robert M. LaFollette. Chicago: Literature Department, Workers Party of America, 1924.
- American Imperialism: The Menace of the Greatest Capitalist World Power. Chicago: Literature Department, Workers Party of America, n.d. [1925]
- The Party Organization (Introduction). Chicago: Daily Worker Publishing Co., n.d. [1925]
- Our Heritage from 1776: A Working Class View of the First American Revolution. With Wolfe, Bertram D. and William F. Dunne, New York: The Workers School, n.d. [1926] alternate link
- The Labor Lieutenants of American Imperialism. New York: Daily Worker Publishing Co., 1927.
- The Coolidge Program: Capitalist Democracy and Prosperity Exposed. New York: Workers Library Publishers, 1927. (Workers library #2)
- Ruthenberg, Communist fighter and leader (Introduction). New York: Workers Library Publishers, 1927.
- 1928: The Presidential Election and the Workers. New York: Workers Library Publishers, 1928. (Workers library #4) Yiddish translation
- America Prepares the Next War. New York: Workers Library Publishers, 1928. (Workers library #10)
- Pages from Party History. New York: Workers Library Publishers, n.d. [February 1929].

=== Communist opposition years ===
- "Twelve Years of the Soviet Union," The Revolutionary Age, Vol. 1, no. 1 (November 1, 1929), pp. 7–8.
- The American Labor Movement: Its Past, Its Present, Its Future. New York: Workers Age Publishing Association, n.d. [1932].
- What Next for American Labor? New York: Communist Party of the United States (Opposition), n.d. [1934]
- Marxian classics in the light of current history. New York City, New Workers School 1934
- Soviet Foreign Policy and the World Revolution. New York: Workers Age Publishers, 1935 alternate link
- People's Front Illusion: From "Social Fascism" to the "People's Front." New York: Workers Age Publishers, n.d. [1937].
- New Frontiers for Labor. New York: Workers Age Publishers, n.d. [1938]

=== Post-radical years ===
- The Big Smile: An Analysis of the Soviet "New Look." with Matthew Woll. New York: Free Trade Union Committee, American Federation of Labor, 1955.
- Communist and Workers' Parties' manifesto adopted November–December, 1960; Testimony of Jay Lovestone, January 26, February 2, 1961. Washington, D.C.: United States Government Printing Office, 1961.

== Sources ==
- Alexander, Robert J. (1981). The Right Opposition: The Lovestoneites and the International Communist Opposition of the 1930s. Westport, CT: Greenwood Press.
- Devinatz, Victor G. (2002). Reassessing The Historical UAW: Walter Reuther's Affiliation with the Communist Party and Something of Its Meaning — A Document of Party Involvement, 1939. 'Le Travail. Archived from the original on September 17, 2006.
- Hirsch, Fred (1974). An Analysis of Our AFL-CIO Role in Latin America or Under the Covers with the CIA. San Jose, CA: F. Hirsch.
- LeBlanc, Paul, and Tim Davenport, eds. (2015). The "American Exceptionalism" of Jay Lovestone and His Comrades, 1929-1940: Dissident Marxism in the United States, Volume 1. Leiden, NL: Brill.
- Morgan, Ted (1999). A Covert Life: Jay Lovestone, Communist, Anti-Communist & Spymaster. New York: Random House. ISBN 978-0679444008.
- Wilford, Hugh (2008). The Mighty Wurlitzer: How the CIA Played America. Cambridge, MA: Harvard University Press.

Political offices
Preceded by Charles Ruthenberg	Executive Secretary of the CPUSA; 1927–1929	Succeeded by Benjamin Gitlow
Preceded by post created	Executive Secretary, Free Trade Union Committee, American Federation of Labor; 1944–1957	Succeeded by post abolished
Preceded by Michael Ross	Director of AFL-CIO International Affairs Dept. 1963–1974	Succeeded by Ernie Lee
