= FO Finances =

Trade union in France

FO Finances is a trade union representing workers at the Ministry of the Economy and Finance in France.

The union was established in 1947, as a split from the General Confederation of Labour-affiliated Finance Federation. It affiliate to Workers' Force (FO), and was known as the FO Finance Federation. It was initially strong in the treasury department, along with state mortgages, and sections of the customs service.

By 1995, the union had 15,500 members.

== General Secretaries ==
1947: Léon Colas
1952: Pierre Tribié
1954: Léon Colas
1967: Marceau Yde
1975: Charles Ravin
1984: André Roulet
1989: Jacky Lesueur
2003:
Philippe Grasset
