= Workers' Force =

French trade union federation

CGT-FO
- General Confederation of Labor – Workers' Force
- Confédération Générale du Travail – Force Ouvrière
- Founded: 1948
- Headquarters: Paris, France
- Location: France
- Members: 300,000
- Key people: Frédéric Souillot, secretary general
- Affiliations: ITUC, ETUC, TUAC
- Website: www.force-ouvriere.fr

The General Confederation of Labor – Workers' Force (French: Confédération Générale du Travail – Force Ouvrière, or simply Force Ouvrière, FO), is one of the five major union confederations in France. In terms of following, it is the third behind the CGT and the CFDT.

Force Ouvrière was founded in 1948 by former members of the General Confederation of Labor (CGT) who denounced the dominance of the French Communist Party over that federation.

FO is a member of the European Trade Union Confederation. Its leader is Frédéric Souillot, since June 2022.

== History ==
After World War II, members of the French Communist Party attained considerable influence within the CGT, controlling 21 of its 30 federations. The communists, at the time in the French government, used their positions inside the CGT to stop strikes in the name of the "battle for national production". Maurice Thorez, the leader of the PCF, made a telling declaration : "Strike is the tool of the capitalist trusts". For quite a number of union members, this attitude was a betrayal of the 1906 Charte d'Amiens, a text which upheld as its main principle the total independence of the unions from the state and any political party. Senior figures such as Robert Bothereau and the former secretary general, Léon Jouhaux, just coming back from a concentration camp, opposed this development and gathered around the paper "Résistance Ouvrière", renamed the 20 December 1945 Force Ouvrière.

In May 1947, the Communist ministers were excluded from the government led by Paul Ramadier, a Socialist, because they were incapable of quelling the ultimately victorious strike in the biggest factory in France, the Renault car plant in Boulogne-Billancourt. Tensions rose again when Moscow ask the PCF to boycott the Marshall Plan in September. The CGT split in three in November 1947 : Jouhaux and four confederal general secretary officially left the confederation and create the CGT-FO on 12^{th} April 1948. The Federation for National Education (FEN) stayed neutral and independent from the two confederations.

Along with a majority of autonomous syndicalists who believed deeply in the Amiens Charter, the rank and file of the confederation were also composed of a reformist right-wing linked with the SFIO, and a revolutionary left-wing with anarcho-syndicalist like Hébert and revolutionary syndicalists like Monatte.

In February 1958, the African branches of FO became an independent organization, Confédération Africaine des Syndicats Libres-FO.

In 1963, when André Bergeron became leader of the Confederation, the links between FO and the French Section of the Workers' International (SFIO) became distended. Indeed, if Bergeron had been an SFIO member for a short period, he was also a hardcore reformist who believed firmly in "social agreement" with the employers and the De Gaulle right-wing government. He helped create a social security offices with them, that FO presided over.

In 1968, FO was one of the Grenelle agreements signatories. Fearing an integration of the unions into the state, they were the only confederation to call for a "No" vote in the 1969 referendum, which led to the defeat and final resignation of De Gaulle from power.

The link of the reformists, inside the confederation, with the socialist movement was completely broken in 1972 with the creation of the Socialist Party, because the main syndicalist core of this party was coming from Christian syndicalism, either the CFTC or the secular CFDT. After François Mitterrand's election, FO presented itself as the only independent trade-union confederation.

In 1989, Marc Blondel was elected leader of FO, against the will of Bergeron. He wanted to preserve the independence of the confederation. Supported by a radical minority, he adopted a more combative attitude. In this, he participated in the 1995 social conflict against Alain Juppé's plans for welfare reform, and improved relations with the CGT. In consequence, FO lost the precedence of social security offices for the benefit of the Confédération Française Démocratique du Travail.

In 2003, Blondel called for a general strike against the plan of pensions reforms. Afterwards, he was replaced byJean-Claude Mailly. FO participated in the 2006 campaign against the Contrat première embauche. In April 2018, Pascal Pavageau, who presented himself as being part of the historical and traditional Workers' Force trend (independence of trade unions towards the political parties) became the new secretary general.

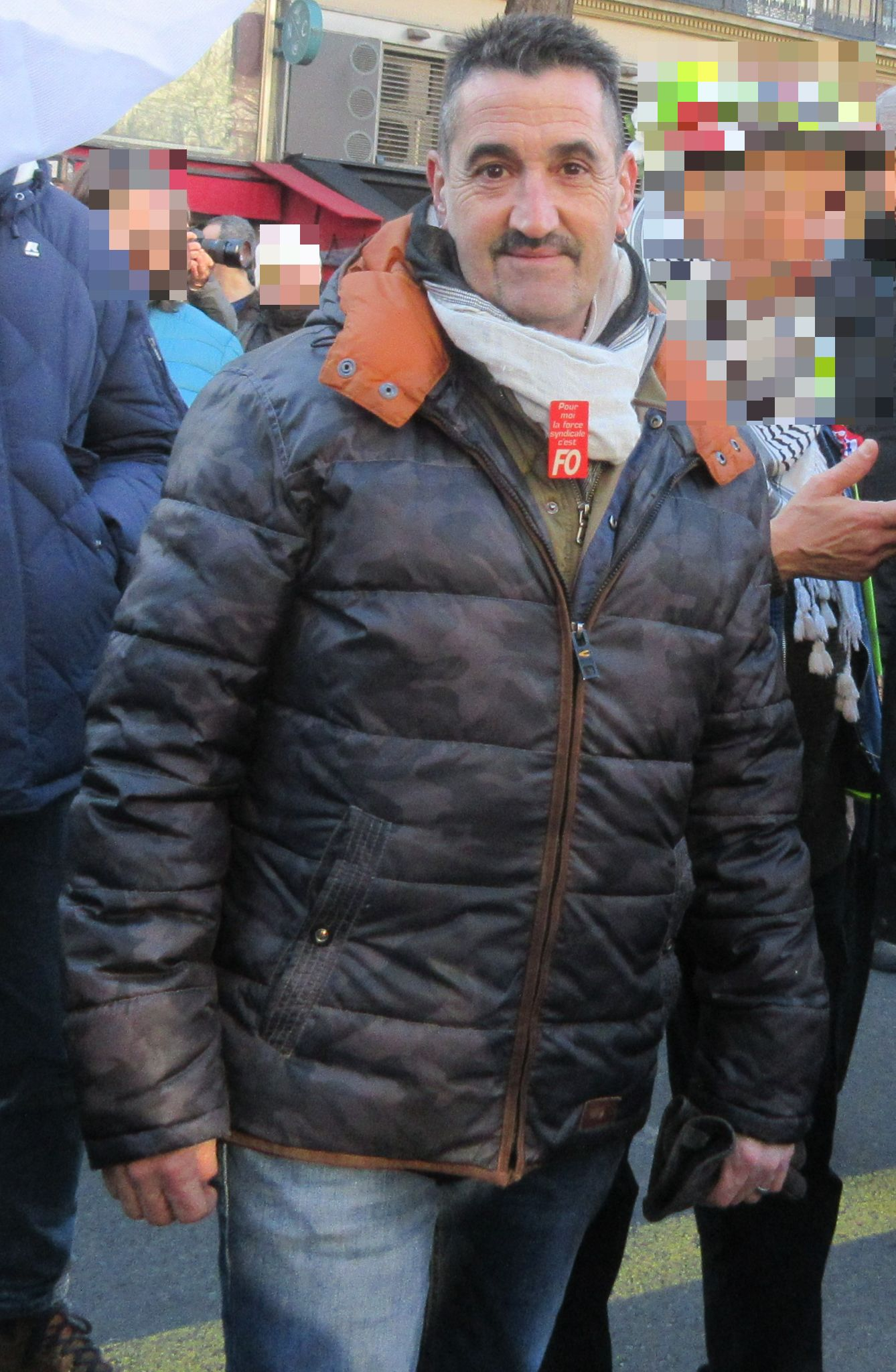
Frédéric Souillot, in 2023

=== General Secretaries ===
- Robert Bothereau (1948–1963)
- André Bergeron (1963–1989)
- Marc Blondel (1989–2004)
- Jean-Claude Mailly (2004–2018)
- Pascal Pavageau (2018)
- Yves Veyrier (2018–2022)
- Frédéric Souillot (2022–present)

== CIA involvement ==
The group's ties with the American Central Intelligence Agency (CIA) were leaked in 1967 by Thomas Braden, a former director of covert operations for the agency. In his expose on The Saturday Evening Post, Braden wrote of the CGT strike: "Into this crisis stepped [Jay] Lovestone and his assistant, Irving Brown. With funds from Dubinsky's union, they organized Force Ouvrière, a non-Communist union. When they ran out of money, they appealed to the CIA. Thus began the secret subsidy of free trade-unions which soon spread to Italy. Without that subsidy, postwar history might have gone very differently." American influence was never total, and there were disputes between FO leadership and the American representatives (for example, over French colonialism).

== Professional elections ==
FO won 15.81% of the vote in the employees' college during the 2008 professional elections. This was below FO's 18.28% result in 2002. Its highest ever result was 20.55% in 1997.

== Affiliates ==
FO organizes 15,000 unions, distributed in 103 departemental union and 26 professional federations. The following federations are affiliated with the confederation:

Federation	Abbreviation	Founded	Membership (2002)
Book Federation	FO Livre	1949	
Chemistry Federation	Fédéchimie	1948	15,000
Federation of Arts, Entertainment, Audiovisual, Press, Communication and Multimedia	Fasap		
Federation of Employees and Managers	FEC	1893	65,000
Federation of Equipment, Environment, Transport and Services			
Federation of General State Administration	FAGE		30,000
Federation of Public Service and Health Service Staff	FSPS	1948	135,000
Federation of Workers' and Travellers' Representatives			
Federation of Workers in Hairdressing, Beauty and Perfumery	FO-Coiffure		
FO Communication	FO Com	1948	50,000
FO Construction	FO Construction	1948	25,000
FO Defence	FO Défense	1948	30,000
FO Finances	FO Finances	1947	45,000
FO Metals	FO Metaux	1948	50,000
General Federation	FG-FO		
General Federation of Agriculture, Food, Tobacco and Related Services Workers	FGTA	1975	45,000
General Union of Police			
National Federation of Education, Culture and Vocational Training	FNEC FP	1948	
National Federation of Energy and Mines	FNEM	2000	
National Federation of Pharmacy			
National Federation of Social Action	FNAS	1972	
National Federation of Transport and Logistics	UNCP		
Trade Union Federation of Railway Workers	FO-Cheminots		
Union of Managers and Engineers	FO-Cadres		

The General Federation of Public Servants brings together those federations representing civil servants.

== See also ==
- Politics of France
  - Trade unions:
    - French Democratic Confederation of Labour
    - French Confederation of Christian Workers
    - General Confederation of Labour
    - French Confederation of Management - General Confederation of Executives
    - Solidaires Unitaires Démocratiques
- Mouvement des Entreprises de France
