= Federal Union of State Trade Unions =

Trade union federation

The Federal Union of State Trade Unions (French: Union fédérale des syndicats de l'État, UFSE) is a trade union federation bringing together unions representing workers in the French Civil Service.

== History ==
The federation was founded in 1909 as the National Federation of Professional Associations of the State, the Departments and the Communes, then in 1919 it became the General Federation of Civil Servants' Federations. In 1946, it was re-established as the General Union of Federations of Civil Servants, and in 2017 it adopted its current name. Since 1927, it has been affiliated to the General Confederation of Labour (CGT).

== Affiliates ==
As of 2020, five CGT federations are affiliated to the UFSE:

- Federation of Education, Research and Culture
- National Federation of Equipment and the Environment
- Finance Federation
- General Federation of National Police Trade Unions
- National Federation of State Workers

== General Secretaries ==
1909: Charles Laurent
1946: Alain Le Léap
1948: Marcel Ragon
1950: Léon Rouzaud
1956: André Berteloot
1963: Roger Loubet
1970: René Bidouze
1978: Thérèse Hirszberg
1996: Bernard Lhubert
2004: Jean-Marc Canon
2021: Céline Verzeletti
