= René Duhamel (trade unionist) =

French unionist

René Duhamel (29 March 1919 – 23 April 1996) was a French trade union leader.

Born in Paris, Duhamel was brought up by his mother, after his father died when he was six years old. He left school at the age of 17, working briefly in a shoe factory before moving to the postal sorting office. He initially had a short-term, seasonal, contract, but he led a movement against redundancies among these workers, and was successful in retaining his job.

In 1935, Duhamel joined the youth section of the French Section of the Workers' International, but he disagreed with its policy of non-intervention in the Spanish Civil War, and so joined the Workers and Peasants' Socialist Party split. After the war, he was a founder of the Unitary Socialist Party, joining its executive committee, but later left the party to focus on trade union work.

In 1939, Duhamel was enlisted into the French Army, joining the meteorological service, based initially in France, but then in Algeria. He then returned to the postal service, rising to become an inspector. He was active in the National Federation of PTT Workers, and remained loyal when it split in 1947. In 1948, he began working on secondment to the union, becoming in 1949 the founding vice-president of the International Union of Trade Unions of Postal, Telephone and Telegraph Workers, becoming president in 1950. In this role, he signed a declaration of friendship with East Germany, leading to his suspension from the postal service in 1951.

In 1957, Duhamel became deputy general secretary of his union, then in 1963, he moved to work for the General Confederation of Labour (CGT), to which it was affiliated, taking responsibility for its educational activities. He retired in 1978, but continued to represent the CGT on various national bodies.

Duhamel was made a knight of the Legion of Honour in 1981, and the same year, was finally reinstated at the postal service, becoming a deputy departmental director. He was promoted to departmental director the following year, and placed on secondment to the CGT.

Trade union offices
Preceded by Jaroslaw Kolar	President of the International Union of Trade Unions of Postal, Telephone and Telegraph Workers; 1950–1967	Succeeded by Raymond Barberis
