= Trade Union International Public Service and Allied =

Trade union in South Africa

TUI-PS&A
- Trade Union International Public Service and Allied
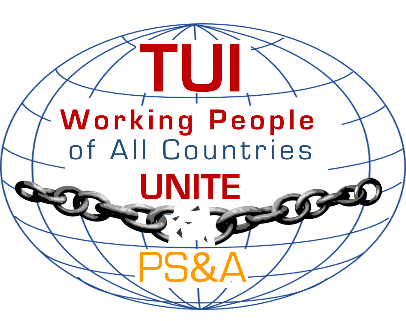
- Founded: 29 October 1949
- Headquarters: Johannesburg, Gauteng
- Location: South Africa
- Members: > 3000
- Key people: Artur Sequeira (President); Zola Saphetha (General Secretary)
- Affiliations: COSATU, WFTU, TUI-PAE, NEHAWU
- Website: tuipublicservice.org

The Trade Union International Public Service and Allied (TUI PS&A) is a section of the World Federation of Trade Unions representing public sector workers.

== History ==
The union was founded at a conference in East Berlin on 29 October 1949 as the International Union of Trade Unions of Postal, Telephone and Telegraph Workers. The name was changed to the Trade Union International of Public and Allied Employees (TUI-PS&A) in 1955 during a conference in Vienna, when it broadened its scope to include workers in the health, finance and public administration areas.

== Organization ==
The TUI-PS&A had a three level structure with the Congress being the highest organ, a directive committee meeting between congress and day-to-day activities led by the executive bureau and secretariat based in East Berlin. There were five branch commission for the different sectors of the labor movement the union represented: posts and telecommunications, bank employees, local public servants and public administration.

In 1957 the headquarters for the organization were reported to be at 0.17 Fritz-Heckert-Straße 70, East Berlin. In 1978 its address was reported as 47 Französische Straße, Postfach 1322 DDR 108, East Berlin. It was reported at the same address in 1985. Its current address is at SRTVS – Quadra 701 – Bloco O – Sala 1512 – Ed. Multiempresarial, Brasília, Federal District, Brazil. The current Head Office is in South Africa as from November 2019.

=== Congresses ===
- 1st: October 1949, East Berlin
- 2nd: 1955, Vienna
- 7th: 11–15 October 1982, Prague
- 13th: November 2019 Larnica
- 14th: November 2023 Bogota, Colombia

== Members ==
In 1955 TUI-PAE claimed 6.8 million members were represented at its Vienna congress. In 1977 it claimed 24.1 million members in 104 member organizations. In 1985 this had grown to 29 million in 104 affiliates in 44 countries, while in 2020 it stood at 20 million members in 50 unions in 34 countries.

In 1978 the following groups were known to be affiliated with the Trade Unions International of Public and Allied Employees:

- Angola - National Union of Employee of Angola
- Bangladesh - Bangladesh Electricity Workers Federation
- Bangladesh - Bangladesh Water Development Workers Federation
- Benin - National Union of Finance Employees of Dahomey
- Benin - National Union of Health Service Workers
- Benin - National Federation of Civil Servants
- Benin - National Union of Employees of Products Conditioning
- Benin - Custom Employees Union of Dahomey
- Benin - National Union of Municipal Workers
- Chile - National Association of Municipal Employees
- Chile - National Association of Civil Servants
- Congo - Fédération Syndicale des Travailleurs de l'Administration Générale et des municipalités
- Cyprus - Pancyprian Government and Military Workers Union
- Czechoslovakia - State Administration, Finance, and Foreign Trade Employees Union
- Ecuador - National Federation of Municipal Employees of Ecuador
- France - National Federation of Employees of Commerce, Credit Institutions, Insurance Establishments, Social Insurance and Allied Branches
- France - Federation of Public and Health Service Workers
- France - National Federation of State Workers
- East Germany - Union of Employees of State Organs and the Communal Economy
- Ghana - Postal and Telecommunications Workers Union of Trade Union Congress of Ghana
- Hungary - Public Employees Union
- India - All India P&T Casual Workers Union
- India - All India State Government Employees Federation
- India - All India Bank Employees Association
- India - Calcutta Corporation Mazdoor Union
- Iraq - General Union of Public and Social Service Workers
- Italy - Italian Federation of Postal and Telecommunications Workers
- Italy - Federation of Local Government and Hospital Workers
- Italy - Union of Grassroot Trade Unions
- Jordan - General Syndicate of the Public and Allied Employees of Jordan
- Madagascar - Syndicat des Medecins Diplome de l'Ecole des Medecins de Tananarive
- Nigeria - Internal Revenue Staff Association
- Peru - Bank Employees Federation of Peru
- Poland - Union of Local Economy Workers
- Romania - Union of State Administration and Peoples' Council Employees
- Soviet Union - States Institutions Workers Union
- Soviet Union - Medical Workers Union
- Sri Lanka - All Ceylon Government Clerks Union
- Sri Lanka - Public Service Workers Trade Union Federation
- Sri Lanka - Local Government and Municipal Employees' Union
- Syria - Professional Federation of Health Service Workers Union
- Syria - Professional Federation of Public Sector Unions
- Uruguay - Federation of Health Service Employees
- Uruguay - Confederation of Civil Servants
- Uruguay - Federation of Sewerage and Water Supply Workers
- Uruguay - Association of Municipal Employees and Workers
- South Yemen - Public Employees Union

== Publications ==
The TUI-PAE published a quarterly Public Services in English, French, Spanish and German. It also published Information Bulletin in English, French, Spanish, Russian and German.

== Leadership ==
=== General Secretaries ===
1949: Willi Baumgart
1958: Paul Wolff
1961: Willi Albrecht
1964: Dagobert Krause
1977: Hans Lorenz
1986: Jochen Meinl
1992: Sukomal Sen
2009: Sebastiao Soares
2015: Pierpaolo Leonardi
2019: Zola Saphetha

=== Presidents ===
1949: Jaroslaw Kolar
1950: René Duhamel
1968: Raymond Barberis
1982: Alain Pouchol
1998: Lulamile Sotaka
2015: Artur Sequeira
2019:Artur Sequeira
