= Raymond Barberis =

French trade union leader

Raymond Barberis (24 October 1922 – 11 December 2016) was a French trade union leader.

Born in Paris, Barberis grew up in Nice. He was still studying in 1944, when the liberation of France occurred, when he began working in administration for the local police department. He joined the National Federation of Public Services, and affiliate of the General Confederation of Labour (CGT), and also joined the French Communist Party. He rapidly came to prominence as a trade unionist, serving on the union's council for its police section, and then the administrative staff section. He relocated to Paris, and in 1947 became the full-time secretary, then general secretary, of the regional union of public and health staff.

In 1948, Barberis was elected to the national council of the National Federation of Public Services, then in 1949 began working at the CGT's Paris regional office. He remained there until 1963, but from 1953 to 1959 also served again as general secretary of the regional union of public and health staff. He then began working in administration for the City of Paris, but remained active in the CGT and helped found the General Union of Engineers and Managers.

In 1963, Barberis was elected as general secretary of the renamed Federation of Public Services and Health. In 1968, he was additionally elected as president of the Trade Union International of Public and Allied Employees, and from 1969 he served on the executive of the CGT. In 1978, he stood down as general secretary to work at the CGT office, leading on the public sector, nationalised industries, and propaganda, then in 1982, he became secretary to the CGT general secretary, Henri Krasucki. He left trade unionism in 1985, and became the director of a mutual insurance organisation in Paris, later serving as its president. He retired in 1991.

Trade union offices
Preceded by Henri Lartigue	General Secretary of the Federation of Public Services and Health; 1963–1978	Succeeded by Alain Pouchol
Preceded by René Duhamel	President of the Trade Union International of Public and Allied Employees; 1968–1982	Succeeded by Alain Pouchol
