= Céline Verzeletti =

French trade unionist (born 1969)

Celine Verzeletti
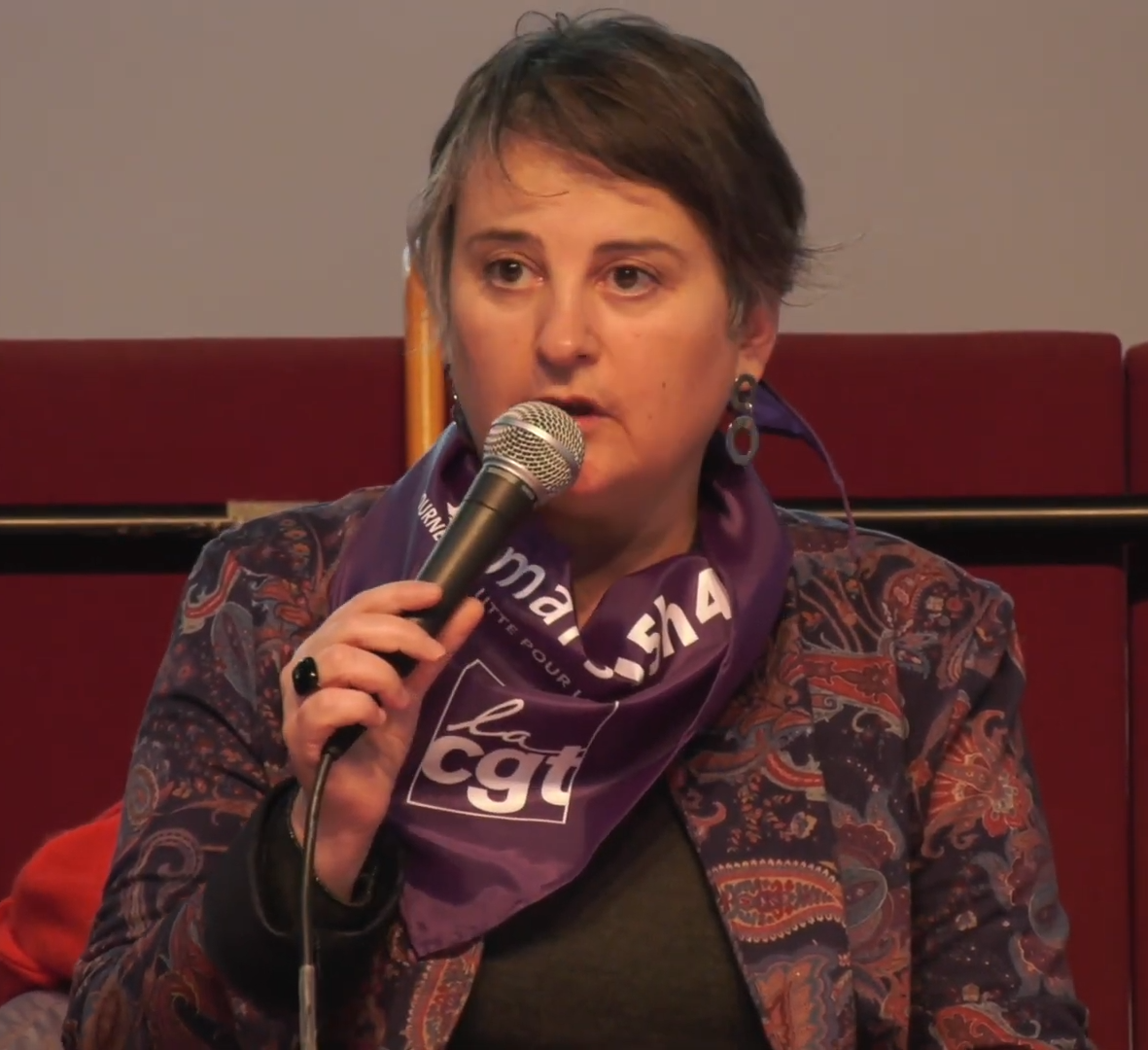
- Céline Verzeletti in 2020

General Secretary of the Federal Union of State Trade Unions
- Incumbent
- Assumed office 2021

Personal details
- Born: 16 February 1969 (age 57) Le Havre

Céline Verzeletti (born 7 February 1969) is a French trade unionist, currently member of the General Confederation of Labour (CGT).

== Biography ==
Verzeletti was born in February 1969 in Le Havre. She is the daughter of a railway worker who was a CGT activist and a teacher. She grew up in Juillannear Tarbes, in the Hautes-Pyrénées. She studied at the Marie-Curie high school in Tarbes. After a few difficult years, she passed the prison administration exam and became a prison guard. She was active in the Young Communists, then joined the French Communist Party.

From 2003 to 2012, she was general secretary of the CGT prison union. In 2015, she became a member of the CGT confederal office, where she was responsible for Equality, Trade Union Freedoms and Coordination of Struggles issues. In 2021, she became co-general secretary of the Federal Union of State Trade Unions (UFSE), a group bringing together around 50,000 union members.

She is said to be quite close to NUPES and La France Insoumise, and announces, in a personal capacity, her participation in demonstrations organized by these political organizations, such as the march against the high cost of living in 2022.

In 2023, although she was not a candidate, she was mentioned among the people likely to succeed Philippe Martinez at the head of the confederation, during the 53rd congress in Clermont-Ferrand. Philippe Martinez, for his part, wanted Marie Buisson to succeed him but against all expectations it was another female trade unionist, Sophie Binet, who was elected as the new general secretary of the CGT.

For the 2024 French legislative election, she was invested by the New Popular Front in Paris's 15th constituency, allocated to La France Insoumise according to the coalition agreements. The outgoing deputy of this constituency, Danielle Simonnet, was not reinvested by her party like four other outgoing LFI deputies, who announced that they would maintain their candidacies. Danielle Simonnet was re-elected in the second round with 74.5% of the vote, against Céline Verzeletti.
