= Clothing and Hat Federation =

Trade union of France

The Clothing and Hat Federation (French: Fédération de l'Habillement et de la Chapellerie) was a trade union representing workers in the clothing industry in France.

The union was founded in January 1948, by a group of former members of the General Confederation of Labour-affiliated Clothing Federation, who objected to the influence of the French Communist Party in that organisation. It affiliated to Workers' Force, and also to the International Garment Workers' Federation. Throughout its existence, the union was led by Hélène Parmentier.

By 1954, the union had 5,000 members. In 1962, it was merged into the Federation of Hides, Leather, and Kindred Trades, which was renamed as the General Federation of Hides and Skins and Clothing.
