= Édouard Aubert =

French trade union leader

Édouard Aubert (23 October 1908 – 6 November 1971) was a French trade union leader.

Born in Lyon, Aubert excelled in his studies, but he left school to complete an apprenticeship as a dyer, his father's trade. He then moved to the United States, to work for his older brother. However, when a strike took place, in 1927, and he supported the workers against his brother. He left his brother's company, and moved to New York, where he worked as a cabaret musician and dancer.

In 1929, Aubert returned to France, to complete his compulsory military service. He then returned to work as a dyer, to support his widowed mother, being sacked for militant activity on several occasions. Although an interest in anarchism initially led him not to join a trade union, in 1933, he joined the United General Confederation of Labour (CGTU). This led him to join the French Communist Party (PCF), and he was soon appointed as the secretary of the CGTU's textile union. He led the joint negotiations on wages in the textile industries, and once the CGTU merged into the General Confederation of Labour (CGT), he was a leading figure on the left of the union. He also organised union sporting activities.

In 1939, Aubert was elected as general secretary of his union, the National Federation of Textile Industry Workers. He was called up for service during World War II, in a tank regiment, was captured by the German Army in 1940, but managed to escape the following year. He hid in Vernaison and was active in the French Resistance, assuming the false identity of "Marius Laurenson". This enabled him to become a director of a company making belts, and provided cover for him printing materials for a Lyon-based resistance group.

Aubert was arrested in 1943, and although he escaped from the police station, he was recaptured a few days later. He was imprisoned, but led an uprising of prisoners, protesting against some being sent to Germany. As a result, he was one of twenty people sent to the Blois detention centre, where he compiled an underground newspaper. In 1944, he was sent to the Dachau concentration camp, surviving to be repatriated at the end of the war.

Back in France, Aubert was able to resume work as leader of the textile workers' union. In 1949, he was a founder of the Trade Union International of Textile and Clothing Workers, becoming its president, then vice president of its successor, the Trade Union International of Textile, Leather and Fur Workers Unions.

In 1971, Aubert became ill, and was diagnosed with cancer. He died later in the year.

Trade union offices
Preceded by Alexandre Delobelle	General Secretary of the National Federation of Textile Industry Workers; 1939–1971	Succeeded by ?
