= National Federation of Agricultural Workers =

National Federation of Agricultural Workers is the name of:

- National Federation of Agricultural Workers (France)
- National Federation of Agricultural Workers (Italy)
