= Federation of Public Service and Health Service Staff =

Trade union of France

The Federation of Public Service and Health Service Staff (French: Fédération des personnels des Services Publics et des Services de Santé, FSPS) is a trade union representing public and health service workers in France.

In 1948, the executive of the Public Services Federation voted in favour of remaining affiliated to the General Confederation of Labour (CGT). As a result, the minority, led by general secretary Raymond Bomal, left and formed a new union, affiliated to Workers' Force. It also affiliated to the Public Services International.

By 1995, the union had 80,250 members, and by 2017, this had grown to a claimed 135,000.

== General Secretaries ==
1948: Raymond Bomal
1958: Jacques Bonnore
1973: Félix Fortin
1984:
1986: René Champeau
1991: Alain Brousseau and Camille Ordronneau
2002: Jean Marie Bellot
2008: Didier Bernus
2016: Yves Kottelat
2019:
