= FNST =

FNST may stand for:

- Femoral nerve stretch test, a neurological procedure
- Fédération Nationale des Syndicats de Transports or Transport Federation, French trade union
- Friedrich-Naumann-Stiftung für die Freiheit, German foundation
