= Federation for National Education =

Trade union of France

The Federation of the National Education (Fédération de l'Education nationale or FEN) was a French federation of teaching unions.

It succeeded the General Federation of Teaching (Fédération générale de l'enseignement) founded in 1929 and affiliated to the General Confederation of Labour (Confédération générale du travail or CGT). After World War II the CGT split, and the reformist wing created Workers' Force. In 1948, the teaching federation voted to leave the CGT and become independent. A minority of members retained dual membership with the CGT, and formed a new CGT Federation of Education.

The FEN was dominated by the group called "Unity, independence and democracy" close to the Socialists. The minority groups were "Unity and action", influenced by the Communists, and "Emancipated school" close to the far left.

The FEN was nicknamed the "fortress of teachers" and advocated secular education. Its power and mobilization capacity were dreaded by the government, but it imploded due to its political divisions. At the beginning of the 1990s, faced with the growth of "Unity and action", the Socialist majority proposed that the union should affiliate to a non-CGT national union confederation. The unions dominated by "Unity and action" were ejected and founded the Fédération Syndicale Unitaire (FSU, United Trade Union Federation).

The FEN and other reformist unions of civil servants created the National Union of Autonomous Trade Unions (Union nationale des syndicats autonomes or UNSA). In 2000, the FEN became UNSA Education. However, UNSA Education today represents a minority in the teaching world and has largely been surpassed by the FSU.

== Affiliates ==
The largest affiliates were:

- National Teachers' Union (SNI)
- National union of secondary education (SNES)
- Administration and Stewardship union (A&I)
- National union of agents of national education (SNAEN)
- National Union for Higher Education (SNESup)
- National union of technical staff in higher education (SNPTES)
- National union for physical education (SNEP)
- National Union of Autonomous Action Technical Education (SNETAA)
- Union of nurses and health educators (snies)
- National trade union of technical and pedagogical advisers of popular education

== General Secretaries ==
1945: Adrien Lavergne
1956: Georges Lauré
1966: James Marangé
1974: André Henry
1981: Jacques Pommatau
1987: Yannick Simbron
1991: Guy Le Néouannic
1997: Jean-Paul Roux

== See also ==
- List of education trade unions
