= Krasucki =

Krasucki (feminine: Krasucka; plural: Krasuccy) is a Polish surname. Notable people with the surname include:

- Franciela Krasucki (born 1988), Brazilian sprinter
- Henri Krasucki (1924–2003), French trade-unionist
- Nathaniel Krasucki (Born 2009),

Kansas City Soccer Player
