= Chemistry Federation =

Trade union of France

The Chemistry Federation (French: Fédération de la Chimie, Fédéchimie) is a trade union representing workers in chemical and related industries in France.

The union was established on 24 January 1948, as the National Federation of the Chemical and Glass Industries. Its members had formerly belonged to the National Federation of Chemical Industries or the Glass Federation, both affiliated to the General Confederation of Labour, but objected to the influence of the French Communist Party in those unions. The new union affiliated to Workers' Force (FO).

In 1971, the union's general secretary, Maurice Labi, argued unsuccessfully for the union to merge with the Federation of Chemical Industries, an affiliate of the French Democratic Confederation of Labour. Defeated, Labi resigned and joined the CFDT with a few hundred supporters.

By 2002, the union claimed 15,000 members. In 2011, FO Textiles was dissolved, and the majority of its members transferred to the Chemistry Federation.
