= French Federation of Book Workers =

Trade union of France

The French Federation of Book Workers (French: Fédération française des travailleurs du livre, FFTL) was a trade union representing printing workers in France.

The union was founded in 1881 at a conference in Paris. Initially, it struggled, but under the leadership of Auguste Keufer, it became centralised and espoused reformist social democracy. In 1895, it was one of the main founding affiliates of the General Confederation of Labour (CGT). By 1920, the union claimed 20,000 members. After World War II, the union had many closed shop agreements, and few members left to join the Workers' Force-affiliated Book Federation.

By 1964, the union claimed 60,000 members. In 1967, it was admitted to the International Graphical Federation (IGF), itself linked to the International Confederation of Free Trade Unions (ICFTU). This was a unique situation, as the CGT was aligned with the French Communist Party, and its other affiliates were linked with the World Federation of Trade Unions, and it led to the IGF being suspended from the ICFTU.

In 1982, the union merged with the National Federation of Paper and Cardboard, to form the Federation of the Book-Paper-Cardboard Industry.

== General Secretaries ==
1881: Mantel
1884: Jacques Alary
1884: Auguste Keufer
1920: Claude Liochon
1944: Édouard Ehni
1963: Maurice Lefond
1967: Fernand Besnier
1971: Jacques Piot
