= Grenelle agreements =

1968 French government labor agreement

The Grenelle Agreements (French: Accords de Grenelle) or Grenelle Reports were negotiated 25 and 26 May, during the crisis of May 1968 in France by the representative of the Pompidou government, the trade unions, and the Organisation patronale française. Among the negotiators were Jacques Chirac, then the young Secretary of State of Local Affairs, and Georges Séguy, representative of the Confédération générale du travail.

The Grenelle Agreements, concluded 27 May 1968—but not signed—led to a 35% increase in the minimum wage (salaire minimum interprofessionnel garanti) and 10% increase in average real wages. It also provided for the establishment of the trade union section of business (Section syndicale d'entreprise), through the act of 27 December 1968.

Rejected by the base, the agreements did not immediately solve the social crisis and the strikes continued. But three days later on 30 May, Charles de Gaulle, back in Paris after meeting with Jacques Massu in Baden-Baden, Germany, the previous day, was confronted by an enormous Gaullist counter-demonstration on Champs-Élysées. He decided to dissolve the National Assembly and to call for elections on 30 June 1968. The triumph of the Gaullists of the UNR (293 of 378 seats) ended the political crisis.

The name Grenelle is taken from the area where the agreements were negotiated, at the Ministry of Social Affairs located on the rue de Grenelle in Paris. The hotel, built in the late 18th century, formerly the Archbishop's Palace, was actually part of the Ministry of Labour since 1905. The "Room of Agreements", named since then, is an old dining room decorated in 18th-century style has been preserved.

== See also ==
- Grenelle de l'environnement
