= FO Communication =

Trade union of France

FO Communication is a trade union representing communication workers in France, mostly working for La Poste and France Télécom.

The union was established in April 1948 as the Trade Union Federation of PTT Workers, and affiliated to Workers' Force (FO). It brought together two groups which had in 1947 split from the General Confederation of Labour-affiliated National Federation of PTT Workers: The Autonomous PTT Trade Union Federation, led by Camille Mourguès, and the Independent Federation of PTTs, led by Dominique Grimaldi.

Membership of the union grew from 26,500 in 1950, to a claimed 60,000 in 1977. By 1995, it was 30,000. In 2000, the union renamed itself as "FO Communication".

== General Secretaries ==
1948: Camille Mourguès
1956:
1969: André Fossat
1978: Claude Pitous
1982: Jacques Marçot
1993: Jacques Lemercier
2000s:
2010s: Nicolas Galepides
