= Federation of Hides, Leather, and Kindred Trades =

Trade union of France

The Federation of Hides, Leather, and Kindred Trades (French: Fédération des cuirs et peaux et parties similaires) was a trade union representing workers in various related industries, including shoemaking, in France.

The union was established on 11 April 1948, at a meeting in Paris. Its members split from the National Federation of Hides and Leather, unhappy with the influence of the French Communist Party in that union, and it affiliated to Workers' Force. It was initially led by André Derdos, who since February had been the secretary of the General Union of Hides and Skins of the Paris Region.

By 1960, the union claimed 3,500 members. In 1962, it merged with the Clothing and Hat Federation, to form the General Federation of Hides and Skins and Clothing. Despite this, membership declined, in line with job losses in the industry, and in 1978, it merged with the National Federation of Textiles, to form the Federation of Textiles, Hides and Skins and Clothing.

== General Secretaries ==
1948: André Derdos
1951: Julien Le Pape
1962: Marcel Pernette
1968: Roger Sandri
