= Public Function =

Trade union of Italy

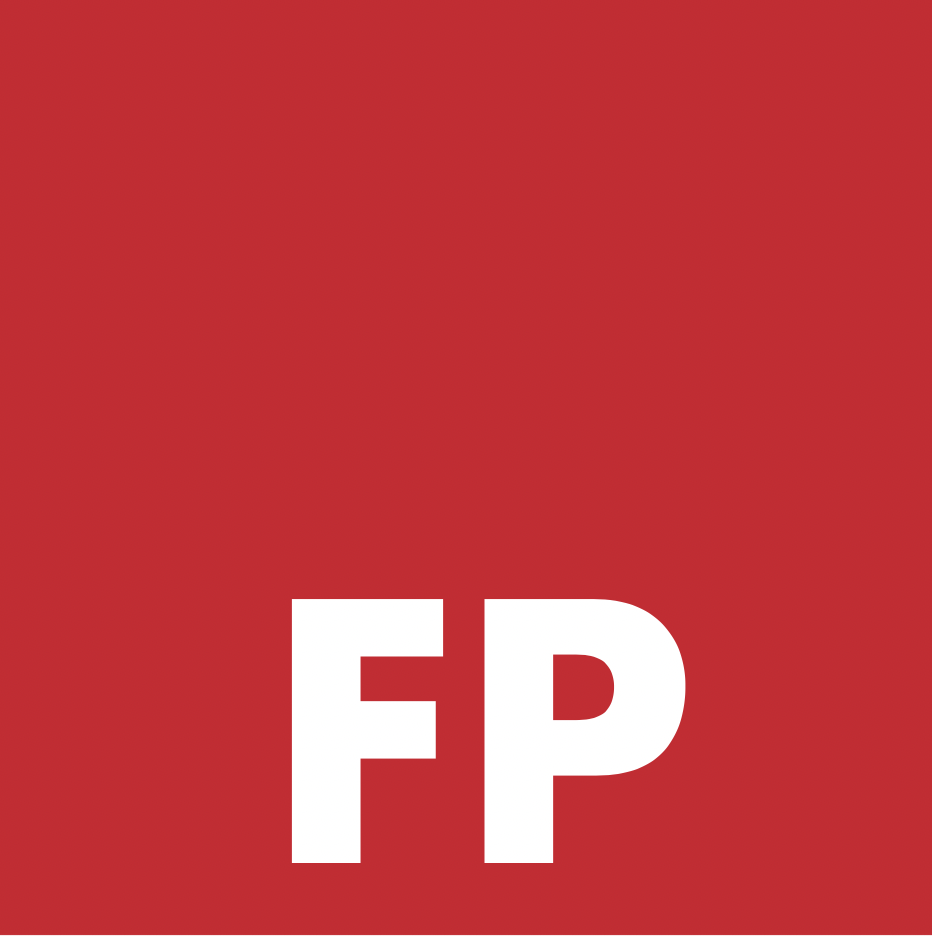
Logo of the union

Public Function (Italian: Lavoratori della Funzione Pubblica, FP) is a trade union representing public sector workers in Italy.

The union was founded in 1980, when the National State Federation merged with the National Federation of Local Authority and Healthcare Workers, and the Italian Federation of Public Sector Workers. Like all its predecessors, it affiliated to the Italian General Confederation of Labour. By 1998, the union had 348,925 members, of whom 60% worked in public administration, and the remainder in health and social services.

== General Secretaries ==
1980: Giuseppe Lampis
1981: Aldo Giunti
1988: Alfiero Grandi
1990: Giuseppe Schettino
1994: Paolo Nerozzi
2000: Laimer Armuzzi
2002: Carlo Podda
2010: Rossara Dettori
2016: Serena Sorrentino
