= Federation of Workers in the Book, Paper and Communication Industries =

Trade union of France

The Federation of Workers in the Book, Paper and Communication Industries (French: Fédération des travailleurs des industries du livre, du papier et de la communication, FILPAC) is a trade union representing workers in the printing industry in France.

The union was founded in 1982, when the French Federation of Book Workers merged with the National Federation of Paper and Cardboard, to form the Federation of the Book-Paper-Cardboard Industry. Like its predecessors, it affiliated to the General Confederation of Labour. By 1994, the union had 27,262 members, but this has fallen over time.
