= Textile, Clothing, Leather and Laundry Federation =

Trade union of France

The Textile, Clothing, Leather and Laundry Federation (French: Fédération textile habillement cuir blanchisserie, THCB) is a trade union representing workers in several related industries in France.

The union was founded in 1985, when the National Federation of Textile Industry Workers merged with the National Federation of Hides and Leather, and the Clothing Federation. The union was originally named the Textile, Leather and Clothing Federation, but changed its name in 2014, when it created a new section for laundry workers. Like its predecessors, the union is affiliated to the General Confederation of Labour (CGT).

== General Secretaries ==
1985: Christian Larose
2003: Maurad Rabhi
2023: Hassen Nassi
