= Federazione Nazionale Statali =

Trade union of Italy

The National State Federation (Italian: Federazione Nazionale Statali, FNS) was a trade union representing civil servants in Italy.

The union was founded in 1945, and affiliated to the recently formed Italian General Confederation of Labour. By 1954, it had 68,699 members. In 1980, it merged with the National Federation of Local Authority and Healthcare Workers and the Italian Federation of Public Sector Workers, to form Public Function.

== General Secretaries ==
1945: Cesare Pilia
1955: Ugo Vetere
1971: Antonio De Angelis
