= Maurice Copigneaux =

French trade union leader

Maurice Eugène Frédéric Copigneaux (15 November 1868 – 10 September 1943) was a French trade union leader.

Copigneaux lived in Paris and joined the city union for municipal workers. This was an early affiliate of the General Confederation of Labour (CGT), and Copigneaux was the union's delegate to the second CGT congress, in 1896. In 1897, he became the treasurer of the CGT. The following year, a rail strike led by the CGT failed, and the federation's general secretary, Lagailse, was removed from office. Copigneaux was chosen as his replacement.

In 1900, Copigneaux stood down as general secretary of the CGT, but he remained active in his union. In 1903, he was one of eleven founders of the National Federation of Municipal and Departmental Workers. In 1919, this was renamed as the National Federation of Public Services, and Copigneaux was elected as its general secretary, serving until 1921.

Copigneaux was a socialist, and a founder member of the French Section of the Workers' International (SFIO), becoming secretary of its Épinettes branch. He planned to stand in local elections in 1919, but this led to a dispute, and he ended up leaving the SFIO. However, from 1925 until 1929, he served on the municipal council as an independent.

Trade union offices
Preceded by J. Garcin	Treasurer of the General Confederation of Labour; 1897–1898	Succeeded by Schmitt
Preceded by Absalon Lagailse	General Secretary of the General Confederation of Labour; 1898–1900	Succeeded by Victor Renaudin
Preceded by ?	General Secretary of the National Federation of Public Services; 1919–1921	Succeeded by ?
