= Health and Social Protection Federation =

Trade union of France

The Health and Social Protection Federation (French: Fédération de la santé et de l’action sociale, Santé) is a trade union representing workers in the healthcare and social protection industries in France.

The union was founded in 1979, as a split from the Public Services Federation. It has grown steadily, having 37,150 members in 1994, and 74,725 in 2019, making it the second largest affiliate of the General Confederation of Labour.

== General Secretaries ==
1979: Yvette Bellamy
1982:
2000s: Nadine Prigent
2011: Nathalie Gamiochipi
2015: Mireille Stivala
