= Union of Employees of State Organs and the Communal Economy =

Former East German trade union (1961–1990)

The Union of Employees of State Organs and the Communal Economy (German: Gewerkschaft der Mitarbeiter der Staatsorgane und der Kommunalwirtschaft, MSK) was a trade union representing workers in state organisations, the finance and legal sector, and services provided by local government.

The union was established in 1961, when the Free German Trade Union Federation (FDGB) split up the Union of Government Administration, Healthcare and Finance. Initially, it only represented state workers, but from 1963 it also represented those working in services provided by local government. This meant that, by 1964, it had 500,000 members. In 1973, the Union of Civilian Employees of the NVA was split from the MSK.

Internationally, the union was affiliated to the Trade Union International of Public and Allied Employees.

In March 1990, the union became independent, and changed its name to the Union of Public Services. It transferred its members in the finance sector to the new Trade, Banking and Insurance Union of the DDR, and began working closely with the West German Public Services, Transport and Traffic Union (ÖTV). However, in May, the ÖTV decided to start it own, rival, unions in East Germany. In October, the union dissolved itself, asking members to transfer to the ÖTV.

== Presidents ==
1961: Walter Steingräber
1962: Arndt Helfer
1966: Heinz Bartsch
1977: Helmut Thiele
1980: Rolf Hößelbarth
1989: Joachim Wegrad
1990: Jürgen Kaiser
