= National Federation of Entertainment, Cinema, Audiovisual and Cultural Action Unions =

Trade union of France

The National Federation of Entertainment, Cinema, Audiovisual and Cultural Action Unions (French: Fédération nationale des syndicats du spectacle de l'audiovisuel et de l'action culturelle, CGT Spectacle) is a trade union representing workers in the entertainment and media sectors in France.

The federation originated in 1902 as the Musicians' Federation, organised by Gustave Charpentier, and it affiliated to the General Confederation of Labour (CGT). In 1909, it became the General Entertainment Federation, and then in 1914, the Federation of Entertainment Unions. In 1921, its left wing joined the United General Confederation of Labour split, but returned in the mid-1930s. This took membership from 8,000 to a claimed 14,000.

The union was banned during World War II, but reformed after the war, and in 1946 had 45,000 members. In 1947, the right wing of the union left to join Workers' Force.
