= Louis Viannet =

French trade unionist

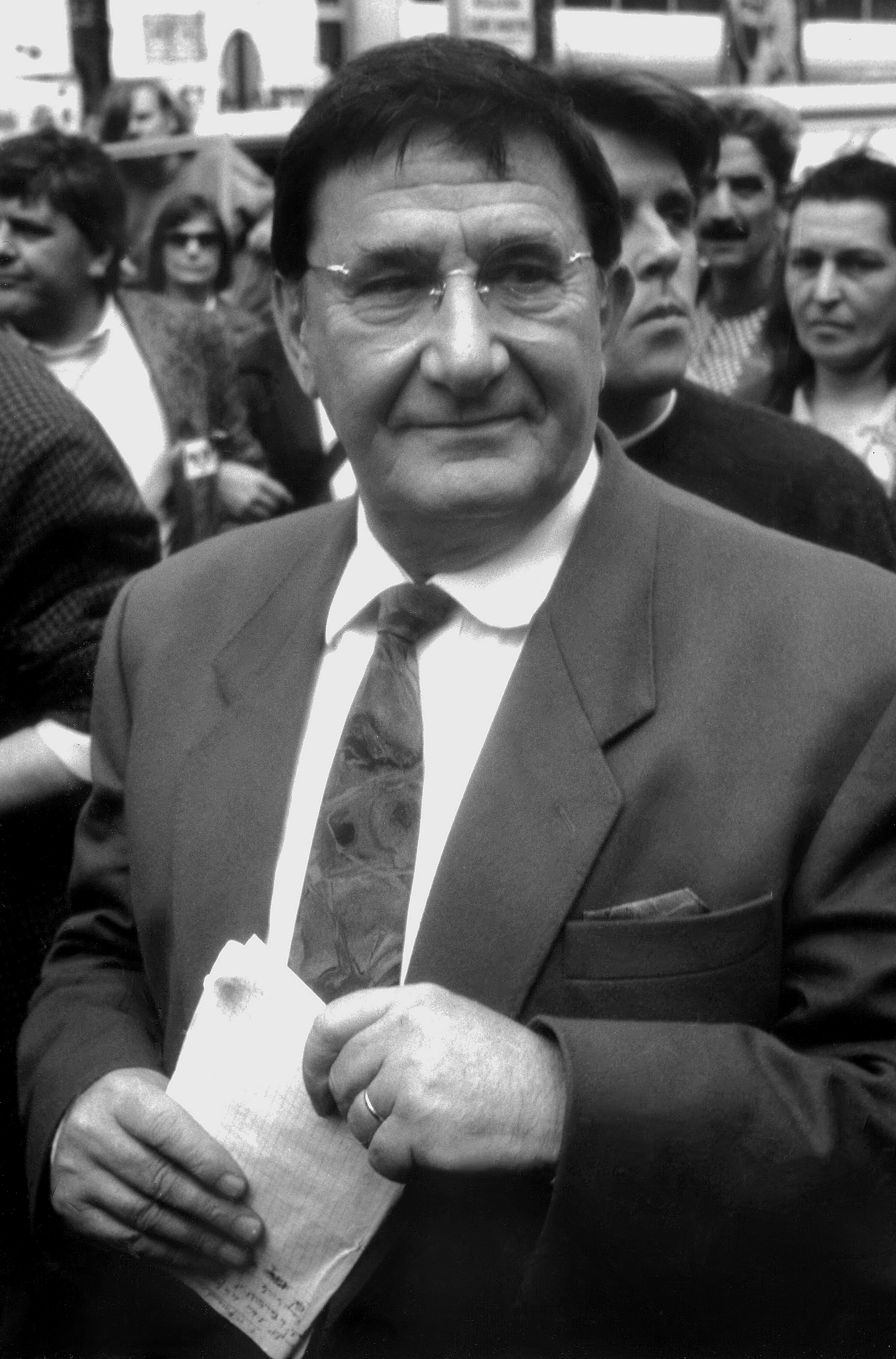
- Image of Louis Viannet

General Secretary of the General Confederation of Labour
- In office 1992–1999
- Preceded by: Henri Krasucki
- Succeeded by: Bernard Thibault

Personal details
- Born: 4 March 1933 Vienne, France
- Died: 22 October 2017 (aged 84) Annonay, France

Louis Viannet (4 March 1933 – 22 October 2017) was a French trade union leader.

Born in Vienne, Isère, Viannet began training as a controller for the Postes, Télégraphes et Téléphones (PTT). During the strikes of 1953, he was inspired to join the General Confederation of Labour (CGT). He completed his training, and his compulsory military service, then returned to work for the PTT in Lyon.

In 1962, he was elected as secretary of his local union of PTT workers, then in 1967, began working full-time for the National Federation of PTT Workers. He was elected as deputy general secretary of the union in 1972, also winning a place on the executive of the CGT, then as general secretary in 1979.

In 1982, Viannet began working full-time in the CGT office, as director of La Vie Ouvrière, the federation's weekly newspaper. He was also elected to the bureau of the French Communist Party (PCF). Within the party, he was regarded as an orthodox figure, whereas the federation's general secretary, Henri Krasucki, was seen to be becoming more moderate, and distancing himself from the PCF. In 1992, Viannet was elected to succeed Krasucki but, contrary to expectations, he continued Krasucki's approach. In 1995, the CGT left the World Federation of Trade Unions, in order to join the social democratic European Trade Union Confederation, and in 1996, he resigned from the bureau of the PCF, while still remaining on its national council.

Under Viannet's leadership, membership of the CGT increased, and it placed first in the labour court election of 1997. He stood down from his union posts in 1999. In retirement, he suffered from poor health, but spent much of his time hunting. In 2015, he intervened in the crisis in the CGT, calling on general secretary Thierry Lepaon to resign.

Trade union offices
Preceded by Georges Frischmann	General Secretary of the National Federation of PTT Workers; 1979–1982	Succeeded by Albert Leguern
Preceded by Henri Krasucki	General Secretary of the General Confederation of Labour; 1992–1999	Succeeded by Bernard Thibault
