= National Federation of Ports and Docks =

Trade union of France

The National Federation of Ports and Docks (French: Fédération nationale des ports et docks) is a trade union representing dockers in France.

The union was founded in 1901, to represent dockers, stevedores, charcoal burners, and other port employees, and it affiliated to the General Confederation of Labour (CGT). In 1935, it merged with the equivalent union from the United General Confederation of Labour at a conference in Le Havre. This took membership from 20,000 to a claimed 92,000. Although the union was banned during World War II, it reformed after the war, and in 1946 had 90,000 members.

Unlike many other CGT federations, the union did not split when Workers' Force was created in 1948, but instead remained affiliated to the CGT and the World Federation of Trade Unions. As a result, it has had high levels of membership density: between 45% and 90% in each branch.

Employment in the sector has gradually fallen, and with it, membership of the union. By 1994, the union had 13,952 members.
