= Willi Albrecht =

German trade union leader and politician

Willi Albrecht (12 September 1896 – 21 January 1969) was a German union leader and politician.

Born in Erfurt, Albrecht completed an apprenticeship as a locksmith and machine fitter. In 1917, he joined the German Metalworkers' Union (DMV). In 1918, he joined the Independent Social Democratic Party of Germany, then in 1920 moved to the Communist Party of Germany (KPD). He became the leader of the Erfurt branch of the Roter Frontkämpferbund, the KPD's paramilitary organisation.

Albrecht was arrested and detained for his political activity in 1923, and again in 1929. In 1931, he was expelled from the DMV, and he instead became leader of the Revolutionäre Gewerkschafts Opposition, the KPD-aligned union organisation, in Thuringia. From 1930, he was also a member of Erfurt City Council for the KPD.

In May 1933, Albrecht was arrested on the orders of the Nazi government, and while in detention he spent time in Lichtenburg concentration camp. He was released in April 1934, and found work as a heating engineer. He was arrested again in 1944 and sent to Buchenwald concentration camp, but survived.

At the end of World War II, Albrecht was a founder of the re-established KPD, and then of its successor, the Socialist Unity Party of Germany (SED). He was also a founder of the Free German Trade Union Federation (FDGB), serving on its executive from 1946, and as president of its Thuringia district from 1945 until 1949.

In 1946, Albrecht was elected to the Landtag of Thuringia, and from 1949 to 1950, he was the state's Minister of Labour and Social Welfare. In 1948, he was appointed to the German People's Council. In 1951, he was appointed as president of the Union of Administration, Banking and Insurance, and from 1958 he held the same position in its successor, the Union of Government Administration, Healthcare and Finance. In 1960, he moved to become general secretary of the Trade Union International of Public and Allied Employees, and from 1961 also served on the executive of the World Federation of Trade Unions. He retired in 1964 and died five years later.

Trade union offices
| Preceded by Karl Oltersdorf | President of the Union of Administration, Banking and Insurance; 1951–1958 | Succeeded by Union merged |
| Preceded by New position | President of the Union of Government Administration, Healthcare and Finance; 1958–1960 | Succeeded by Walter Steingräber |
| Preceded by Paul Wolff | General Secretary of the Trade Union International of Public and Allied Employees; 1960–1964 | Succeeded by Dagobert Krause |
