= Clothing Federation =

French trade union

The Clothing Federation (French: Fédération de l'Habillement) was a trade union representing workers in the garment industry in France.

The union was established in 1892, on the initiative of the tailors of Nîmes. It affiliated to the General Confederation of Labour (CGT) and grew in size. From the 1920s, it began working closely with the Hatters' Federation. In 1941, the leaders of the two federations led splits to form a single, pro-Vichy government union, and were expelled from the CGT. The underground majority of the union continued, and in 1946, the hatters finally merged into the Clothing Federation. In 1947. a minority of the union left and soon formed the rival Clothing and Hat Federation.

In 1985, the union merged with the National Federation of Textile Industry Workers, and the National Federation of Hides and Leather, to form the Textile, Leather and Clothing Federation.
