= National Federation of Hides and Leather =

Trade union of France

The National Federation of Hides and Leather (French: Fédération des Cuirs et Peaux) was a trade union representing workers in the leather and fur industries, including shoemakers, in France.

The first National Federation of Hides and Leather was established in 1868, but soon collapsed, and attempts in 1883 and 1891 to revive it also foundered. It was permanently established in 1893, at a congress in Paris. The union affiliated to the General Confederation of Labour (CGT).

Henri Dret served as general secretary of the union from 1904 to 1908, and again from 1915 to 1934. Charles Michels served from 1937, and maintained some underground organisation during World War II, but was executed in 1941. His close comrade, Fernand Maurice, then organised underground work, and later served as general secretary, from 1948 to 1961.

In 1948, a minority of the union left, to form the Federation of Hides, Leather, and Kindred Trades, affiliated to Workers' Force. In 1985, the union merged with the National Federation of Textile Industry Workers, and the Clothing Federation, to form the Textile, Leather and Clothing Federation.
