= National Federation of Textile Industry Workers =

Trade union of France

The National Federation of Textile Industry Workers (French: Fédération nationale ouvrière de l'industrie textile) was a trade union representing workers in the textile industry in France.

The union was founded in November 1891 by unions based in Lyon, Lille, Roubaix and Fourmies. Initially based in Lyon, in 1902 its headquarters moved to Lille. From 1903, it published a national journal, Le Travailleur du Textile. The union was long the largest affiliated to the General Confederation of Labour (CGT), with more than 100,000 members by 1920, and more than 350,000 by 1937.

In 1948, a minority of the union left to form the rival National Federation of Textiles. In 1985, the union merged with the National Federation of Hides and Leather, and the Clothing Federation, to form the Textile, Leather and Clothing Federation.

== General Secretaries ==
1903: Victor Renard
1913: Albert Inghels
1914: Victor Vandeputte
1937: Alexandre Delobelle and Victor Vandeputte
1937: Alexandre Delobelle
1939: Édouard Aubert
1971:
1981: Christian Larose
