= National Federation of Agri-Food and Forestry =

Trade union of France

The National Federation of Agri-Food and Forestry (French: Fédération nationale agroalimentaire et forestière, FNAF) is a trade union representing agricultural, forestry, and food industry workers in France.

The federation was founded in 1981, when the National Federation of Agricultural Workers (FNTA) merged with the Food Federation. The FNTA's former leader, Jacques Potavin, became general secretary of the new union. Like its predecessors, the federation affiliated to the General Confederation of Labour.

In 2008, the Tobacco and Match Workers' Federation merged into FNAF. By 2019, the union had 22,701 members.
