= Georges Séguy =

French trade unionist (1927–2016)

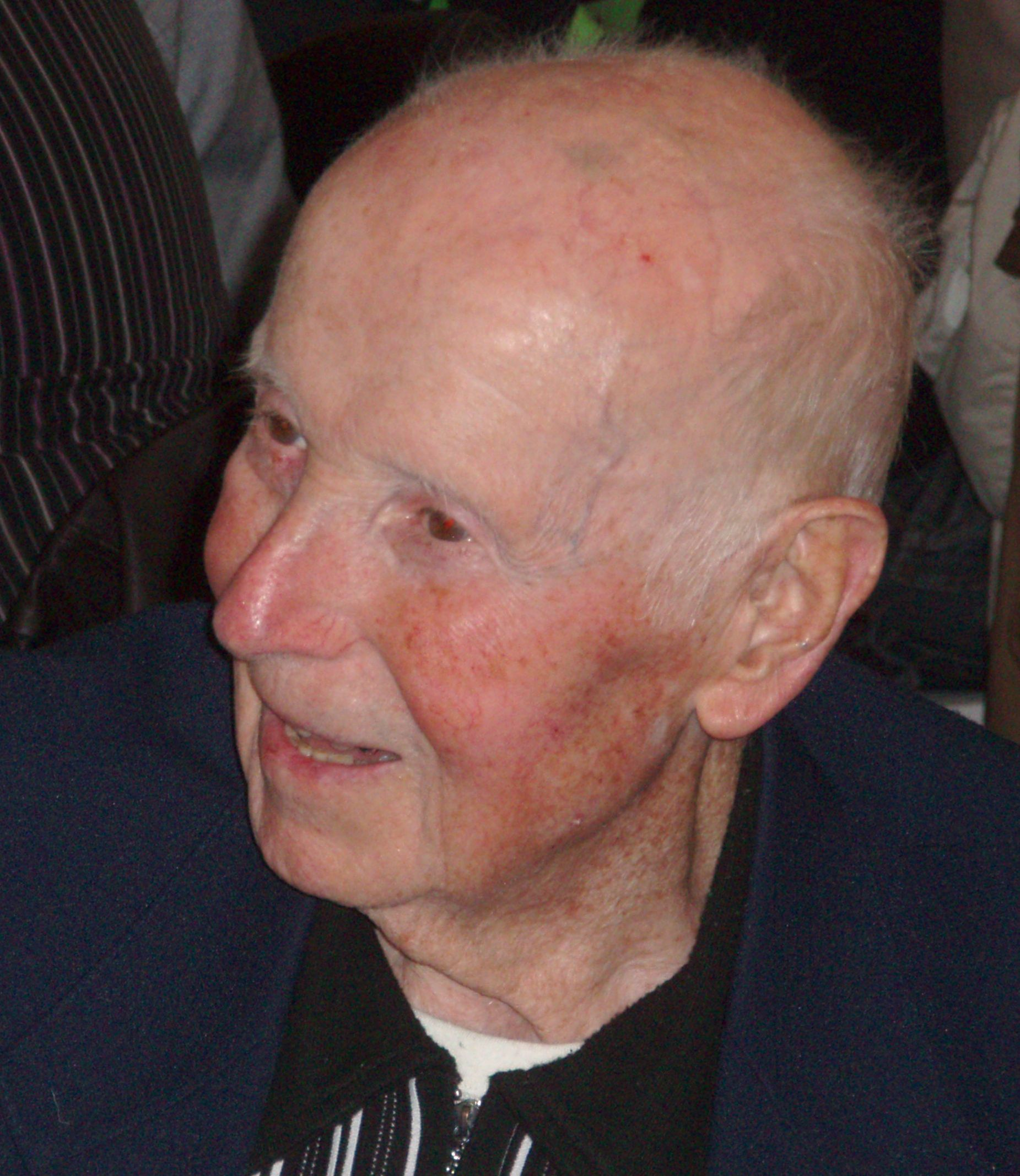
- Georges Séguy in 2013

General Secretary of the CGT
- In office 1967–1982
- Preceded by: Benoît Frachon
- Succeeded by: Henri Krasucki

Personal details
- Born: 16 March 1927 Toulouse, France
- Died: 13 August 2016 (aged 89) Montargis, France
- Occupation: Trade unionist

Georges Séguy (16 March 1927 – 13 August 2016) was a French trade union leader.

== Biography ==
Born in Toulouse, Séguy's father was a communist and trade unionist, and Pierre Semard was a family friend. In 1940, Séguy joined the illegal Communist Youth. After Semard was executed in 1942, Séguy became more involved in the resistance, keeping watch while the movement was sabotaging the railways. He found work at Henri Lion's printing works, which served the resistance, and he soon became its main contact with the underground French Communist Party (PCF), General Confederation of Labour (CGT) and National Front.

In 1944, the printing works was betrayed, and all the staff were arrested. Under torture, Lion refused to give evidence against Séguy, probably saving his life, but Séguy was sent to the Mauthausen concentration camp. While at the camp, he pretended to have skill in metalworking, and was assigned to the aviation workshop, where he undertook various acts of sabotage. He also joined the PCF while in the camp.

Séguy was released in April 1945, and found work as an electrician with the SNCF railway company. He joined a trade union, part of the Railway Workers' Federation, which in turn was an affiliate of the CGT. He soon rose to prominence in the union, being appointed to its secretariat in 1949, and continuing to serve when transferred to Paris, and then Montreuil. He also remained active in the PCF, and spent a couple of months in 1950 studying at its school. This led him, in 1954, to become a substitute member of the PCF's central committee, and its youngest full members in 1956.

In 1956, Séguy was elected as assistant general secretary of the Railway Workers' Federation, with responsibility for resources, then in 1961, he became its general secretary, also serving on the administrative committee of the CGT. Benoît Frachon, leader of the CGT, wished for Séguy to succeed him, so in 1965, he began working full-time in the CGT office, and in 1967, he was elected as the federation's general secretary.

Séguy was supportive of the May 68 movement, and used this to increase the federation's membership by 300,000. He negotiated the Grenelle agreements, but these were rejected by the federation's membership. From 1970, he served on the executive of the World Federation of Trade Unions, but he became increasingly critical of its policy in Eastern Europe, and resigned in 1977. While remaining a member of the PCF, he became increasingly unhappy with the party's strategy, and Henri Krasucki was appointed as the party's representative among the leadership of the CGT.

Séguy retired in 1982, but continued to sit on the CGT executive, and he also set up the Institute for Social History, becoming its president. He remained on the central committee of the PCF until 1994. He was heavily involved in the CGT's centenary celebrations, in 1995, and wrote occasionally on trade unionism until his death, in 2016.

In 1998, Séguy was awarded the Légion d’honneur.

Trade union offices
| Preceded by Robert Hernio | General Secretary of the Railway Workers' Federation; 1961–1965 | Succeeded by Charles Massabieaux |
| Preceded by Benoît Frachon | General Secretary of the General Confederation of Labour; 1967–1982 | Succeeded by Henri Krasucki |
