= Railway Workers' Federation =

Trade union of France

The Railway Workers' Federation (French: Fédération des Cheminots) is the largest trade union representing workers on the railways in France.

== History ==
The union was founded in 1917 as the National Federation of Railway Workers of France, the Colonies and the Protectorate Countries, and affiliated to the General Confederation of Labour (CGT). In 1921, many members left to join the United General Confederation of Labour, but they rejoined in 1935, and this took membership from 165,000 to a claimed 320,000. In 1939, union members who refused to denounce the German-Soviet pact were expelled, and in 1942, Pierre Semard, the union's former leader, was executed by the Vichy regime.

The union was banned during World War II, but reformed after the war, and in 1946 it had 394,000 members. In 1947, many on the right wing of the union left to join Workers' Force. The CGT union remained the largest on the railways, and regularly undertook industrial action in defense of pay and conditions.

By 1994, the union had 58,822 members. By 2019, this had declined slightly to 42,640.

== General Secretaries ==
1917: Marcel Bidegaray
1920: Gaston Monmousseau, Edmond Lévêque, Henri Sirolle and Lucien Midol
1920: Marcel Bidegaray
1921: Adolphe Montagne
1923: Paul Le Guen
1926: Jean Jarrigion
1935: Pierre Semard and Jean Jarrigion
1940: Roger Liaud
1944: Raymond Tournemaine and Gérard Ouradou
1948: Raymond Tournemaine
1953: Robert Hernio
1961: Georges Séguy
1965: Charles Massabieaux
1976: Georges Lanoue
1993: Bernard Thibault
2000: Didier Le Reste
2010: Gilbert Garrel
2017: Laurent Brun
