= National Federation of Textiles =

Trade union of France

The National Federation of Textiles (French: Fédération nationale des Textiles) was a trade union representing workers in the textile industry in France.

The union was founded on 15 February 1948, by former members of the National Federation of Textile Industry Workers who objected to the influence of the French Communist Party in that union. The union affiliated to Workers' Force and the International Federation of Textile Workers' Associations, and by 1954, it claimed 18,000 members.

Over time, membership of the union fell, along with employment in the industry. In 1978, it merged with the General Federation of Hides and Skins and Clothing, to form the Federation of Textiles, Hides and Skins and Clothing.

== General Secretaries ==
1948: Maurice Vanhonacker and Ernest Vigreux
1948: Ernest Vigreux
1952: Maurice Mercier and Ernest Vigreux
1963: Maurice Mercier
1972: Francis Desrousseaux
