= Bernard Thibault =

French trade unionist

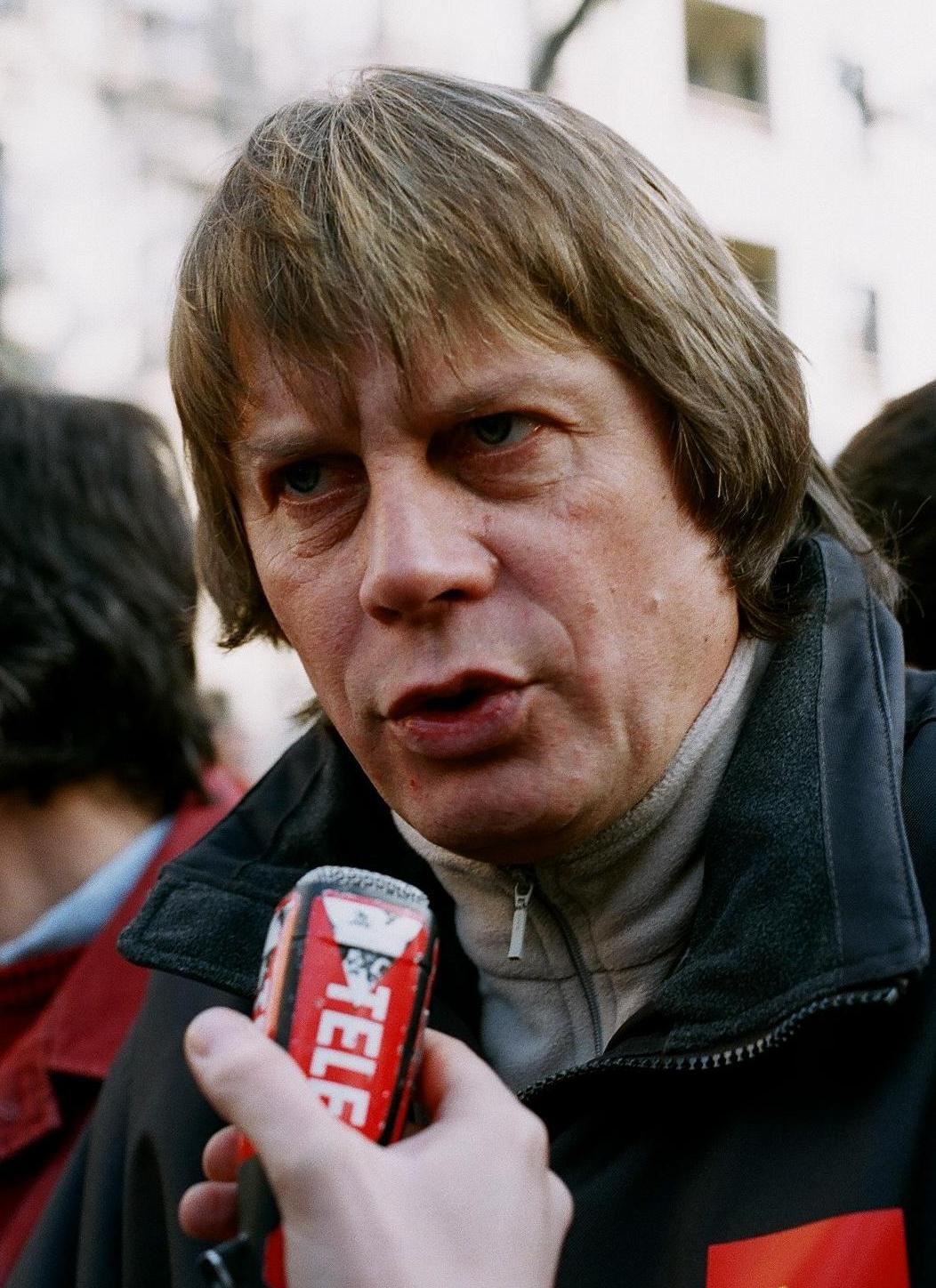
- Bernard Thibault at a demonstration
- Born: 2 January 1959 (age 67); Paris, France
- Occupation: Trade unionist
- Known for: Secretary of the CGT (1999–2013)
- Predecessor: Louis Viannet
- Successor: Thierry Lepaon

Bernard Thibault (born 2 January 1959) is a French trade unionist who was the secretary of the Confédération Générale du Travail (CGT) between 1999 and 2013, a French workers' union. He represents the moderate wing of the CGT, as opposed to the more radical wing noted in Marseille's trade union.

== Biography ==
Bernard Thibault was born on 2 January 1959, in the 6th arrondissement of Paris, from a family hailing from the Morvan area.

At the age of 15, he entered the SNCF apprenticeship centre in Noisy-le-Sec, which he left in 1976 with a qualification in general mechanics. He was then hired by the SNCF yard at Paris-la-Villette. In 1977, he joined the Confédération générale du travail, and was put in charge of the union's "Young workers commission". In 1980, he became secretary of the union in his train yard, and was later elected secretary of the CGT for all rail workers of the Eastern Paris railroad network.

During the strikes of 1986, he provided the impetus for the start of the strikes and is credited with forwarding the principle of coordinated strikes, which the unions had until then been reluctant to adopt. He promoted integrating non-unionist strikers into the decision process, which was largely left to general assemblies of workers at the local level (a practice that was repeated during the large 1995 strikes). He was at the time considered one of the main figures of the strike and a symbol of the renewal of the CGT.

In 1987, he joined the French Communist Party and, shortly thereafter, the CGT federal office for rail workers. In 1997, he was appointed to the confederal office. During the 46th Congress of the CGT in January–February 1999, he succeeded to Louis Viannet as the head of the confederation. He also resigned his national responsibilities in the Communist Party, to fight the idea that the unions were the force driving the party.

Thanks to his comparatively young age, and to the economic recovery in France at the end of the 20th century, he managed to counter the sag in CGT members. The internal tensions in the Confédération Française Démocratique du Travail brought about by the Fillon retirement law prompted members to switch unions and reinforce the CGT.

However, Thibault's efforts to push the CGT towards a more reformist stance, as witnessed for instance during the strikes of November 2007, was met with resistance within the leadership of the union, which for example did not give a voting directive to its members for the 2005 referendum on the European Constitution.

== See also ==
- New Employment Contract
- First Employment Contract
- SNCM

Trade union offices
Preceded by Georges Lanoue	General Secretary of the Railway Workers' Federation; 1993–1999	Succeeded by Didier Le Reste
Preceded by Louis Viannet	General Secretary of the General Confederation of Labour; 1999–2013	Succeeded by Thierry Lepaon
