= Sukomal Sen =

Indian politician

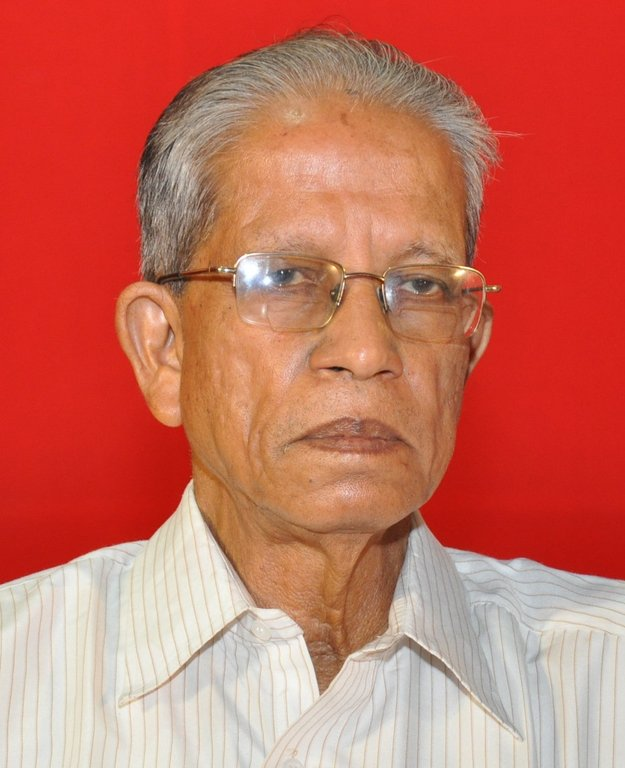
Sukomal Sen, former Rajya Sabha M.P., CPI(M) Control Commission Chairman

Sukomal Sen (14 June 1934 – 22 November 2017) was an Indian trade union and CPI(M) leader. He was the former General Secretary of the Trade Union International of Public and Allied Employees, a structure connected to the World Federation of Trade Unions. He was also the former General Secretary of the All India State Government Employees Federation. and was the Senior Vice-Chairman of the Organisation till his last breath. He was a Central Committee member of the Communist Party of India (Marxist). Sen was a Rajya Sabha member 1982–1994. He is the author of many books including :

1. Working Class of India: History of Emergence and Movement 1830-1990,
2. May Day and Eight hours' struggle in India: A political history
3. SOCIALIST REVOLUTION IN RUSSIA IN 1917 TO CAPITALIST COUNTER REVOLUTION IN 1991(In 2 Volumes) published by Aakar Books, Delhi.
4. "Bharoter sromik andoloner etihas" 1830- 2010" NBA publishers Kolkata (ভারতের শ্রমিক আন্দোলনের ইতিহাস, 1830 -2010)

Sukomal Sen died on 22 November 2017 at 10.00 AM in Kolkata. As per his last wishes his mortal remains were donated to the Medical College in Kolkata for Students' research purpose.
