= FO Textiles =

Trade union of France

The General Federation of Textiles, Leather and Hides and Clothing (French: Fédération générale des Textiles, des Cuirs et Peaux et de l'Habillement, FO Textiles) was a trade union representing workers in several related industries in France.

The union was founded in 1978, when the Federation of Hides, Leather, and Kindred Trades merged with the National Federation of Textiles. Like its predecessors, it affiliated to Workers' Force. It was led by Francis Desrousseaux, former leader of the textiles union, until the early 1990s, then by Francis Van De Rosieren. The industrial areas covered by the union were in rapid decline, and in 2011, the union was dissolved. The majority of the union's remaining affiliates transferred to the Chemistry Federation, but some working in the leather and hides industries instead transferred to FO Pharmacy.
