= Zola Saphetha =

South African trade unionist

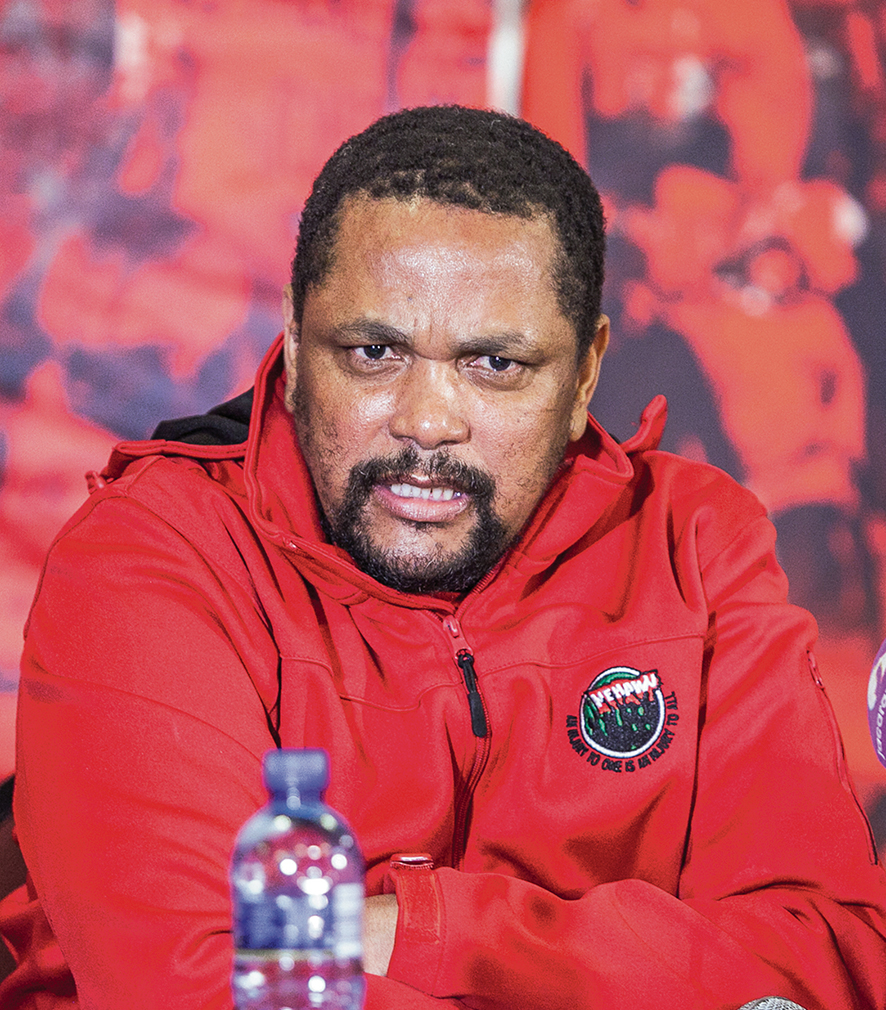
- Saphetha at NEHAWU's 12th Congress in 2021

6th General Secretary of NEHAWU
- Incumbent
- Assumed office June 2017
- Preceded by: Bereng Soke
- Deputy: Welcome Mnisi

10th General Secretary of TUI-PS&A
- Incumbent
- Assumed office 2019
- Preceded by: Pierpaolo Leonardi
- Deputy: A. Sreekumar

Personal details
- Born: 4 May 1979 (age 47) Eastern Cape, South Africa
- Party: African National Congress
- Other political affiliations: South African Communist Party
- Spouse: Ntombikayise Sibhidla-Saphetha
- Website: NEHAWU; TUI-PS&A

Zola Saphetha is a South African trade unionist. He was elected general secretary of the National Education, Health and Allied Workers' Union (NEHAWU) in 2017.

== Career ==
Born in the Eastern Cape, Saphetha joined the Congress of South African Students while at school and rose to become its provincial chair. He studied at the Port Elizabeth Technikon, where he became regional chair of the South African Students Congress, then president of the SRC, and general secretary of the South African Technikon Student Union. While active in the student movement, he helped establish the South African Union of Students. In 1990, Saphetha was elected as the African National Congress's (ANC) political commissar for Pankie Dobo, and he served on the party's regional executive for Port Elizabeth.

On leaving education, Saphetha began working at the University of Durban-Westville. He joined the National Education, Health and Allied Workers' Union (NEHAWU), becoming a shop steward and then branch chair. In 2008, he was elected as NEHAWU's regional chair for KwaZulu-Natal, and before the end of the year was also its acting provincial secretary. In 2012, he was elected as secretary on a permanent basis, then in 2014, he won election as deputy general secretary of NEHAWU.

Saphetha was elected as general secretary of NEHAWU in 2017. In this role, he threatened to withdraw union support from the ANC unless it concedes to some of the union's demands. In 2019, he was additionally elected as general secretary of the Trade Union International of Public Services and Allied Employees.

== Personal life ==
He is married to ANC politician Ntombikayise Sibhidla-Saphetha with two children.
