= Commerce, Services and Distribution Federation =

Trade union of France

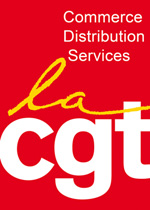

The Commerce, Services and Distribution Federation (French: Fédération des personnels du commerce de la distributions et des services) is a trade union representing service sector workers, particularly retail and distribution staff, in France.

The union was established in April 1973, at a conference in Issy-les-Moulineaux. Relevant members transferred from the Food Federation and the Employees' Federation. Like its predecessors, it affiliated to the General Confederation of Labour. In its early years, the union campaigned for a 40-hour maximum working week, increased pay, and against Sunday working.

By 1994, the union had 15,178 members, but by 2019, this had risen to 44,980.
