= National Federation of Agricultural Workers (France) =

Trade union of France

The National Federation of Agricultural Workers (French: Federation nationale des travailleurs de l'agriculture, FNTA) was a trade union representing agricultural and forestry workers in France.

An Agriculture and Horticulture Federation was formed in 1903, but ceased to operate during World War I. The National Federation of Loggers' Unions of France and the Colonies was founded in 1902, and survived the war. It regularly took part in merger discussions with the Agriculture and Horticulture Federation, but these were unsuccessful.

In April 1920, the National Federation of Loggers' Unions organised a congress in Limoges with various local agricultural unions, forming the new National Federation of Agricultural Workers (FNTA). This affiliated to the General Confederation of Labour (CGT). On founding, it had 198 local sections, and membership grew rapidly, reaching 30,000 by the end of the year. Like the CGT, the union split in the early 1920s, with the left wing forming the United Federation of Agriculture, but this rejoined in 1937, boosting union membership to 150,000.

In 1947, the Sheet Metal Workers' Federation merged into the FNTA.

In 1981, the federation merged with the Food Federation, forming the National Federation of Agri-Food and Forestry.

== General Secretaries ==
1919: Adolphe Hodée
1923:
1937: André Parsal
1945: Maurice Carroué
1971: Jack Potavin
