= National Federation of Equipment and the Environment =

Trade union of France

The National Federation of Equipment and the Environment (French: Fédération nationale de l'équipement et de l'environnement, FNEE) is a trade union representing workers in the Ministry of Ecology, the Ministry of Transport, and the Minister of Territorial Development, in France.

The union was founded in 1973 as the National Federation of Equipment, to represent staff at the Ministry of Equipment, after the National Federation of Technical and Administrative Staff was dissolved. It affiliated to the General Confederation of Labour (CGT). In 1978, the Ministry of Equipment was divided between the Ministry of the Environment and the Ministry of Transport, and the union began covering both ministries. In 1989, it adopted its current name, and by 1994, it had 18,509 members.

== General Secretaries ==
1973: René Simon
1975: Jean-Claude Boual
1991: Denis Glasson
2000: Daniel Chastanet
2002:
2010s: Philippe Garcia
