= Transport Federation =

Trade union of France

The Transport Federation (French: Fédération des transports, FNST) is a trade union representing transport workers in France.

The federation was established in 1902, and affiliated to the General Confederation of Labour (CGT). The union claimed 150,000 members in 1937. It was banned during World War II, but reformed after the war, and in 1946 it had 120,000 members. It suffered a major split in 1948, when Workers' Force was created.

The federation claims 34,500 members, spread across seven sections: urban transport, air transport, road transport, cleaning, highways, taxis, and ski lifts. It does not cover dock workers, sailors, or railway workers, who have their own unions.
