= National Federation of Local Authority and Healthcare Workers =

Trade union of Italy

The National Federation of Local Authority and Healthcare Workers (Italian: Federazione Lavorartori Enti Locali e Sanità, FLELS) was a trade union representing public sector workers in Italy.

The union was founded in 1946, as the National Federation of Local Authority Workers (FNDEL), and it affiliated to the recently formed Italian General Confederation of Labour. By 1954, it had 84,661 members.

In 1958, the union was joined by the Italian Federation of Hospital Employees and Workers in Public and Private Health Agencies, and became the National Federation of Local Authority and Hospital Workers (FNDELO). From 1975, it represented all health workers, and became the National Federation of Local Authority and Healthcare Workers.

By 1979, the union had 306,771 members, of whom 70% worked in public administration, and the remainder in healthcare. The following year, it merged with the National State Federation and the Italian Federation of Public Sector Workers, to form Public Function.

== General Secretaries ==
1946: Giuseppe De Lorenzo
1955: Giovanni Pieraccini
1957: Mario Giovannini
1970: Domenico Cini
