= Auguste Keufer =

French typesetter and syndicalist (1851–1924)

Auguste Keufer (20 April 1851, in Sainte-Marie-aux-Mines – 30 March 1924, in Paris) was a French typesetter and syndicalist. He was the first treasurer of the Confédération générale du travail (CGT)

Orphaned at an early age, Keufer experienced poverty in his youth. He trained as a typographer with the printers Haut-Rhin Jardel.

Trade union offices
Preceded by New position	Treasurer of the General Confederation of Labour; 1895–1896	Succeeded by J. Garcin
