= Federation of Education, Research and Culture =

Trade union of France

The Federation of Education, Research and Culture (French: Fédération de l'éducation de la recherche et de la culture, FERC) is a trade union representing workers in education and related industries, in France.

Until 1948, the Federation for National Education (FEN) was the affiliate of the General Confederation of Labour (CGT) representing education staff. When the FEN chose to become independent, 39% of its members voted to remain affiliated to the CGT. As a result, the FEN decided to permit dual affiliation. The affiliated which opted for dual affiliations with the CGT, plus two unions which decided to remain entirely with the CGT, then formed a CGT Federation of Education.

By 1949, the federation had 14,000 members, but in 1954, under the influence of the French Communist Party, it decided to campaign against dual affiliation, in the hope that this would encourage more teachers to fully commit to the federation. This almost caused the collapse of the federation, with its general secretary resigning, and the secretariat ceasing to meet. It was relaunched in 1959, and then grew steadily, membership peaking at 60,000 in 1979. That year, in the hope of encouraging education workers other than teachers to join, it was renamed as the "Federation of Education, Research and Culture".

Membership fell during the 1980s, in line with that of the CGT as a whole, and by 1994, it stood at 23,314. It has since stabilised, and was 25,258 in 2019.

== General Secretaries ==
1949: Jacqueline Marchand
1954: Post vacant
1959: Claude Bitteroff
1961: Paul Castel
1979: Guy Dupré
1985: Joël Hedde
1994: Christian Dubot
2010: Richard Béraud
2017: Marie Buisson
