= Public Services Federation =

Trade union of France

The Public Services Federation (French: Fédération des services publics) is a trade union representing public sector workers in France.

The union was founded on 6 December 1903 at a meeting in Bourges, held on the initiative of the General Confederation of Labour (CGT). It was initially named the National Federation of Municipal and Departmental Workers.

By 1914, the union had 33 affiliates, with a total of 14,000 members. In 1919, it became the National Federation of Public Services, representing workers employed by municipal government. It suffered a major split in 1922, when the United General Confederation of Labour (CGTU) left the CGT, but it rejoined in 1936, giving the union 180,000 members.

By 1946, the union had grown further, to 300,000 members. In 1948, the right wing of the union left to form the Federation of Public Service and Health Service Staff, affiliated to Workers' Force. In 1979, the Health and Social Protection Federation split away from the union. Membership in 1994 was down to 50,865, but it has since grown steadily, reaching 85,000 in 2019, making it the largest union affiliated to the CGT.

== General Secretaries ==
1919: Maurice Copigneaux
1921:
1925: Ernest Michaud
1937: Lucien Jayat
1945: Raymond Bomal
1948: Henri Lartigue
1963: Raymond Barberis
1978: Alain Pouchol
1995: Vincent Debeir
2002: Maïté Lassalle
2009: Baptiste Talbot
2019: Natacha Pommet
