= Philippe Martinez (trade unionist) =

French trade unionist

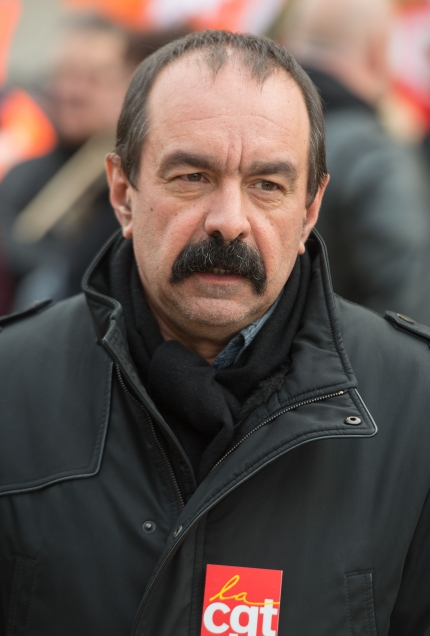
- Philippe Martinez in 2015

General Secretary of the General Confederation of Labour
- In office 3 February 2015 – 31 March 2023
- Preceded by: Thierry Lepaon
- Succeeded by: Sophie Binet

Personal details
- Born: 1 April 1961 (age 65) Suresnes, Seine, France
- Occupation: Technician in the metalworking industry

Philippe Martinez (born 1 April 1961) is a French trade unionist. He was the general secretary of the General Confederation of Labour (CGT) from 2015 to 2023.

== Biography ==
=== Early life ===
His father, born at La Plaine Saint-Denis in France, fought in the International Brigades during the Spanish Civil War in 1936. Philippe Martinez's mother comes from Santander in northern Spain.

Philippe Martinez attended school in Rueil-Malmaison, west of Paris. He engaged into politics as a high school student, first joining the Young Communist Movement and later the French Communist Party.

=== Professional career ===
A technician in the metalworking industry, he worked for the Renault factory of Boulogne-Billancourt from 1982, before he was transferred to the Center for Motor Research at Rueil-Malmaison.

A union member since 1984, he became the CGT central union delegate at Renault.

He left the French Communist Party in 2002 since he disagreed with Robert Hue who wanted to disestablish the Party's sections inside the companies.

In 2008, Martinez was elected general secretary of the Metalworkers' Federation (FTM-CGT), the third largest federation within the CGT with 60,000 members. In this respect, he negotiated with the employers within the scope of the reorganisation of the automotive industry, thus showing his ability to discuss by containing the most radical elements of his union.

In 2013, he was elected a member of the CGT executive committee.

=== General secretary of the CGT ===
Even if he was foreseen to become the general secretary of the union, Martinez was unknown to the public. Even though his team was seen as too close to the previous leading team, it was elected with 57.5 percent of the votes of the National Confederal Committee. Martinez's partner Nathalie Gamiochipi, who was appointed to call for votes against Martinez, decided to support him with the votes of the CGT Santé, the second largest federation of the CGT with 75,000 members. Martinez was elected general secretary of the CGT by the National Confederal Committee on 3 February 2015, with 93.4 percent of the vote, and was confirmed to that position by the congress of Marseille in April 2016, after he travelled across France during one year to meet the local sections of the union to strengthen his popularity.

Even though Martinez embodies the grassroots and the radical line of the union, he is open for labour relations and supportive of the traditional strategy of the union, according to newspapers Le Figaro and Libération. However, according to Les Echos, Martinez being no longer a member of the Communist Party since 2002, he has been the "first [such] general secretary of the CGT since 1946", which shows a "a further step in the detachment of both organisations", even though Martinez did not become supportive of social-democracy. Moreover, Martinez is the first technician, not worker, to lead the union.

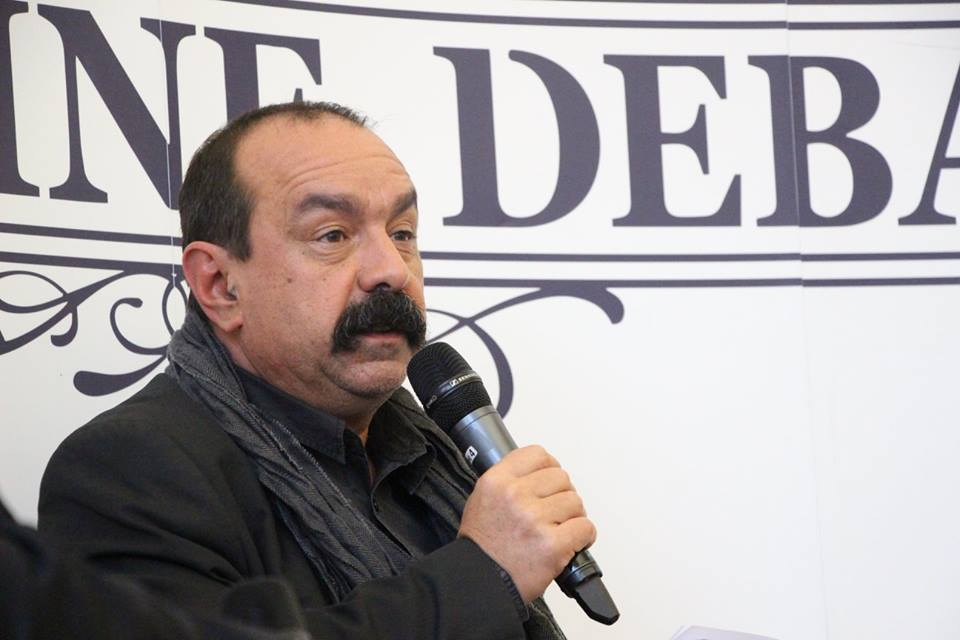
Philippe Martinez in 2017.

To take account of the growing influence of the ultra-left in the union, Martinez took on a hard line of struggle against employers and liberalism, notably against the Valls government by demanding the withdrawal of the 2016 Labour reform bill, to which the CGT became the main opponent. Demonstrations were accompanied by blockades of refineries, repetitive strikes in the transport sector, and stoppage of nuclear power plants, which threatened the smooth running of the UEFA Euro 2016 in France. The Filpac-CGT (Federation of Workers of the Book, Paper and Communications Industry), demanded that all national daily newspapers publish a column of Philippe Martinez —called La modernité, c’est le progrès social, pas la loi travail ! ("Modernity is Social Progress, not Labour Law!")—, for them to be printed out. Only the newspaper L'Humanité published the tribune, and the Filipac voted a strike to stop printing the newspapers, which aroused criticism from newspaper leaders and the national daily press union (SPQN), in the name of freedom of the press.

Faced with the internal oppositions and the decreasing importance of the CGT in the staff representatives elections, this anti-establishment opinion could enable the union to unify the militants and draw benefit from the left-wing voters' dissatisfaction toward the Socialist Party government.

Martinez was re-elected as the general secretary of the CGT during the union's 51st congress in Marseille in April 2016.

Under Martinez's chairmanship, in March 2017, the CGT became the second most important union in the private sector after the French Democratic Confederation of Labour (CFDT). However, it remained the largest union in small businesses and in the Civil Service and therefore remained the largest organisation among all wage earners.

Under Martinez's direction, the CGT organised a 36-day strike in the first semester 2018 against the government's reform plans of the SNCF.

In May 2019, Martinez was re-elected general secretary of the CGT during the 52nd congress in Dijon. He was the only candidate to his own succession and was re-elected with 90.65 percent of votes.

== Opinions ==
When he was elected the general secretary of the CGT, Martinez proposed to reduce the weekly work time to 32 hours to enable the creation of four million new jobs. He also supports a €1800 gross monthly minimum wage, a 60 years old retirement age, and opposes the payment of dividends to shareholders.

Between the two rounds of the 2017 French presidential election between Emmanuel Macron and Marine Le Pen, Martinez claimed he wanted "Macron to have the highest possible score" against the National Front candidate, thereby overstepping the original position of the GGT.

Martinez supported the welcoming of migrants several time: for instance in 2018, he claimed that it was France's "duty" to "welcome them all" and considered as "scandalous" the government's decision to distinguish economic migrants from refugees.

== Private life ==
Martinez lives with Nathalie Gamiochipi, former general secretary of the CGT Santé, the second largest federation of the CGT with 75,000 members.
