= Federation of Employees in the Postal and Telecommunications Sector =

Trade union of France

The Federation of Employees in the Postal and Telecommunications Sector (French: Fédération des salariés du secteur des activités postales et de télécommunications, FAPT) is a trade union representing communication workers in France.

The union was founded in 1919, as the National Federation of PTT Workers, and claimed 75,000 members by the end of the year, about half the total employees at Postes, Télégraphes et Téléphones. It affiliated to the General Confederation of Labour. In 1922, the left wing of the union split away, to form the United Postal Federation. This rejoined in 1935, and by the end of the following year, the union had 111,600 members.

With the exclusion of supporters of the Molotov–Ribbentrop Pact, the union became dominated by collaborators of the Vichy regime and was dissolved. In 1944, after the liberation of France, two separate groups claimed to represent the union, one led by former United Postal Federation leaders, and one with the right wing of the union, which had remained with the CGT. Ultimately, the left wing won out. Membership peaked at 150,000 in 1946, but in 1947, the right wing left and formed the Trade Union Federation of PTT Workers, which affiliated to Workers' Force.

The union had 55,722 members in 1997, and 49,346 members in 2019.

== General Secretaries ==
1919: André Dutailly
1920: Léon Digat
1926: Antoine Tournadre
1927: Paul Gibaud
1932: Émile Courrière
1934: Albert Perrot
1938: Aimé Cougnenc
1944: André Coste
1945: Fernand Piccot
1950: Georges Frischmann
1979: Louis Viannet
1982: Albert Leguern
1988: Maryse Dumas
1998: Alain Gautheron
2004: Colette Duynslaeger
2015: Christian Mathorel
