= Sophie Binet =

French trade unionist (born 1982)

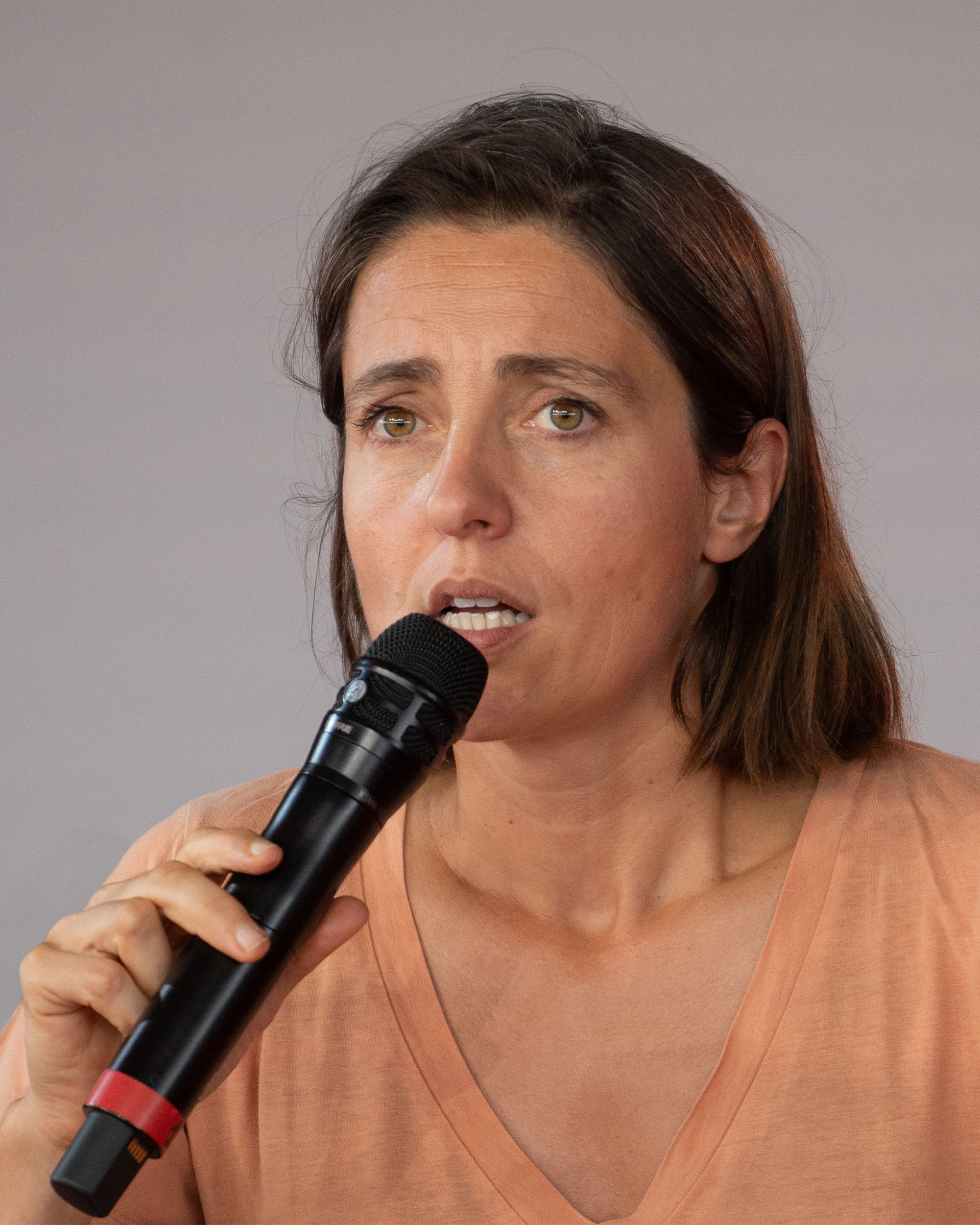
- Sophie Binet in 2023

General Secretary of the General Confederation of Labour
- Incumbent
- Assumed office 31 March 2023
- Preceded by: Philippe Martinez

Personal details
- Born: 5 January 1982 (age 44) Metz, France
- Education: University of Nantes
- Occupation: Former school administrator

Sophie Binet (French pronunciation: [sɔfi bine]; born 5 January 1982) is a French trade unionist who has served as general secretary of the General Confederation of Labour (CGT) since 2023.

== Early life and education ==
At the age of 15, Binet was active in the Young Christian Workers.

She studied philosophy at Nantes University. During her time at the university, she was active in the Union Nationale des Étudiants de France, where she became a prominent protestor in the 2006 youth protests in France.

== Career ==
=== School administration and union activism ===
Binet worked as a school administrator in Le Blanc-Mesnil. During her time as an administrator, she was highly active in the union movement, working at the CGT on environmental and gender equality issues. In 2016, she was active in organising protests against the El Khomri law. In 2018, she was elected general secretary of CGT federation representing engineers, managers and technical staff.

=== Secretary general of the CGT ===
In March 2023, she replaced Philippe Martinez at the head of the CGT. She is the first woman to lead the CGT since its creation in 1895. After her election, she indicated her priority to continue the fight against pension reform.

In December 2025, she was indicted by French authorities for public insult following comments she had made in a January 2025 radio interview. In the interview, Binet commented on billionaire Bernard Arnault's declaration that other businessmen were considering pulling their businesses out of France over a proposed tax. Binet stated that those businessmen would be "like rats leaving a sinking ship," and that their "only goal was the lust for profit."

== Personal life ==
Binet is the partner of a merchant navy officer and mother of a boy.
