= Henri Krasucki =

Polish-born French trade unionist

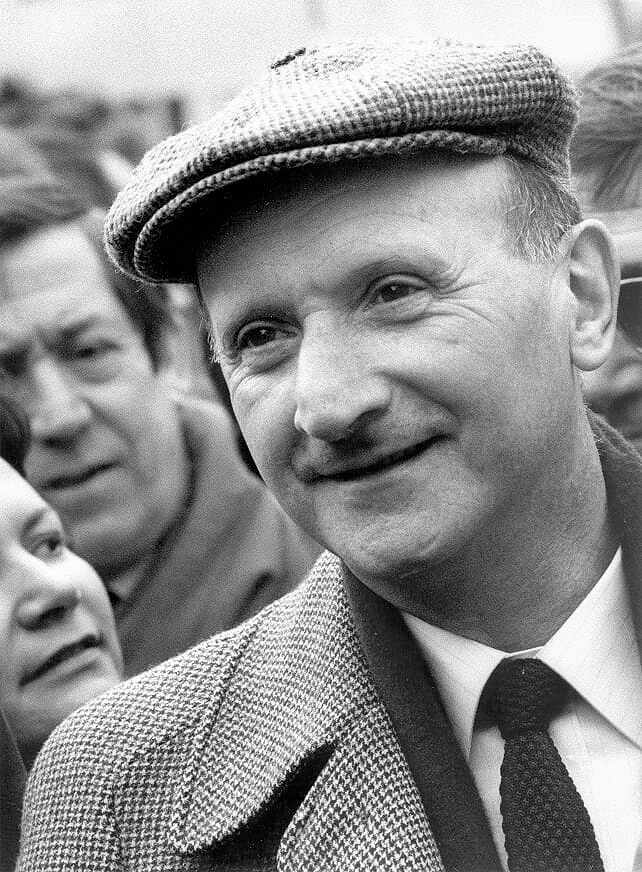

General Secretary of the CGT
- In office 1982–1992
- Preceded by: Georges Séguy
- Succeeded by: Louis Viannet

Personal details
- Born: Henoch Krasucki; 2 September 1924 Wołomin, Poland
- Died: 24 January 2003 (aged 78) Paris, France
- Occupation: Trade unionist

Henri Krasucki (2 September 1924 in Wołomin, Poland – 24 January 2003 in France) was a French trade-unionist, former secretary general of the General Confederation of Labour (CGT) from 1982 to 1992.

== Early life ==
Henri Krasucki's father, Izaak, a worker and activist, emigrated from Poland with his wife, a textile worker and communist activist, in 1926. During the German occupation, his father was arrested on charges of sabotage on 20 January 1943 and interned at Drancy internment camp, before being deported on 13 February to Birkenau concentration camp where he was gassed at his arrival.

During his youth, Henri Krasucki involved himself in cooperative movements, before entering the Renault factory where he began activism as a trade-unionist. Under the Vichy regime, he took part to the FTP-MOI Communist resistance movement composed of immigrants under the pseudonym Mésange (Bluetit). His brother was killed during an attack against a formation of the Wehrmacht. On 23 March 1943, Henri was arrested by the Gestapo who also detained his mother and other resistants. Tortured in the Fresnes prison, where he was detained for six months, Henri Krasucki didn't break under interrogation and kept silent. On 23 June 1943 he was deported from Drancy to Jawischowitz, a sub-camp of Auschwitz, and then to Buchenwald. Out of 1,002 Jews, including 160 children under the age of 18, deported from Drancy in the same train as him (n°55), only 86 survived. On 28 April 1945, Henri Krasucki returned to France, "just in time to demonstrate for the 1st of May," as he said humorously.

== Post-war ==
After the Liberation, he became a leader of the French Communist Party (PCF) although his main interest remained trade-unionism. In 1949, he was secretary of the departmental union of the CGT in the Seine, then entered in 1953 the PCF's federal bureau in the Seine. In 1956, he entered the central committee of the PCF, and then in 1961, the confederal bureau of the CGT, before becoming the director of the union's mouthpiece, La Vie ouvrière. In 1964, he became a member of the political bureau of the PCF, and was for a time one of the candidates of the CGT's leadership in 1967. However, Georges Séguy was ultimately preferred to him, and Krasucki succeeded to him in 1982, during the 41st Congress of the CGT. He kept his functions of secretary general of the CGT until 1992, when he was succeeded by Louis Viannet. During these ten years, the membership of the CGT decreased by half, to approximatively 700,000 members.

At the beginning of his mandate, Krasucki placed himself as main interlocutor with the then Socialist power, until the resignation of the Communist ministers in 1984, when Laurent Fabius succeeded to Pierre Mauroy as Prime Minister. Until the beginning of the 1980s, Krasucki defended some of the most rigid orientations of the PCF, leading him to somehow oppose himself to Georges Séguy, who was attempting, since 1978, to preserve the CGT from the consequences of the rupture of the Left-wings' Union, which had taken place in October 1977.

In 1986, Krasucki was elected as vice-president of the World Federation of Trade Unions (Fédération syndicale mondiale, FSM). Although the beginning of his leadership of the CGT witnessed a radicalization of the union, he undertook a progressive evolution towards more "negotiation" with the government at the end of his mandate and took his distances with the PCF. Thus, he condemned the Tiananmen repression in 1989.

In the 1980s, the French TV comedy sketch show Cocoricocoboy would include Le Bébête Show, puppets satirising leading politicians and personalities. Among them was a puppet with huge crab claws, representing Krasucki (as in "Krab-sucki").

France is renowned for its strikes in which almost all the workforce put down tools. On one occasion a protest march was held by consumers protesting against the strikes. Among their slogans was "Krasucki en Russie", a call for Krasucki to be exiled to Russia, then part of the Soviet Union.

Krasucki remained a member of the PCF's political bureau until 1996. He is buried at the Père Lachaise Cemetery, near the Communards' Wall where one-hundred and forty-seven Communards were executed in 1871. His memory was saluted both by Marie-George Buffet, the national secretary of the PCF, and by then President Jacques Chirac.

== Legacy ==
A roundabout in the 20th arrondissement of Paris was given the name Place Henri Krasucki in his honor on 23 June 2005. It is located at the intersection of Rue des Couronnes, Rue de la Mare, Rue Des Envierges and Rue des Cascades near Belleville. For a long time Krasucki lived just off the roundabout at 107 Rue des Couronnes.

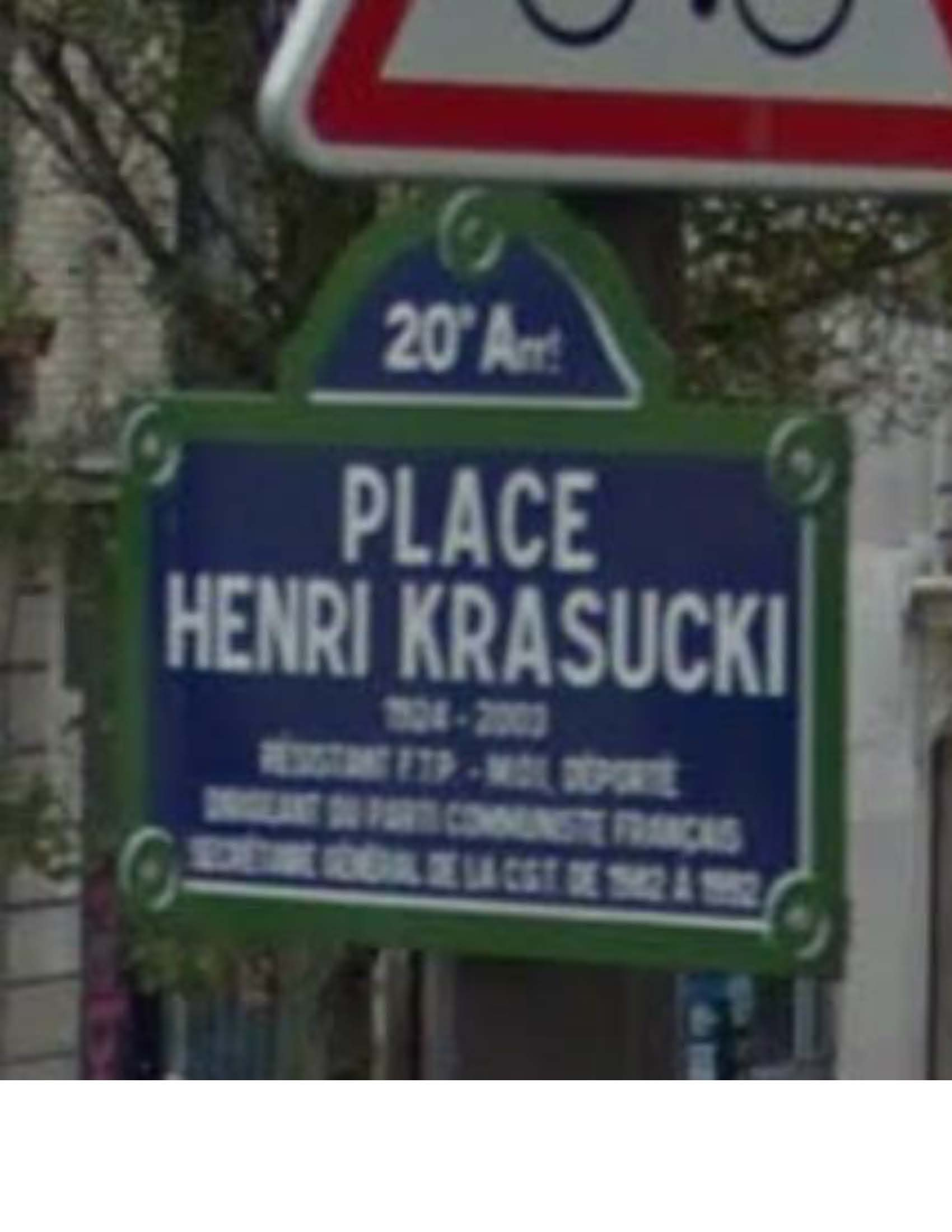
Location sign, Paris

He is portrayed by actor Adrien Jolivet in the 2009 French film The Army of Crime directed by Robert Guédiguian.

== Quotes ==
- "There is no more violent means of coercion used by employers against employees than unemployment" (« Il n’y a pas de moyen de coercition plus violent des employeurs contre les employés que le chômage. » — quoted by Stéphane Beaud & Michel Pialoux in Le Monde diplomatique, November 2001, page 2. )

== Bibliography ==
- Syndicats et lutte des classes, Éditions sociales,
- Syndicats et socialisme, Éditions sociales (1972)
- Syndicats et unité, Éditions sociales (1980).
- Un syndicat moderne? Oui- !, éditions Messidor (1987)
- Henri Krasucki (en souvenirs) by Pierre Tartakowski, éditions Aden (2003)
- La CGT. Audience et organisation by Dominique Andolfatto & Dominique Labbé, éditions La Découverte, (1997)

Trade union offices
Preceded by Georges Séguy	General Secretary of the General Confederation of Labour; 1982–1992	Succeeded by Louis Viannet
