= General Confederation of Labour (France) =

French trade union center

Confédération Générale du Travail
- General Confederation of Labour
- Founded: September 1895
- Headquarters: 263, rue de Paris, 93100 Montreuil, France
- Location: France
- Members: 640,000 (2022)
- General Secretary: Sophie Binet
- Publication: La Vie Ouvrière; Le Peuple
- Affiliations: ITUC, ETUC
- Website: www.cgt.fr

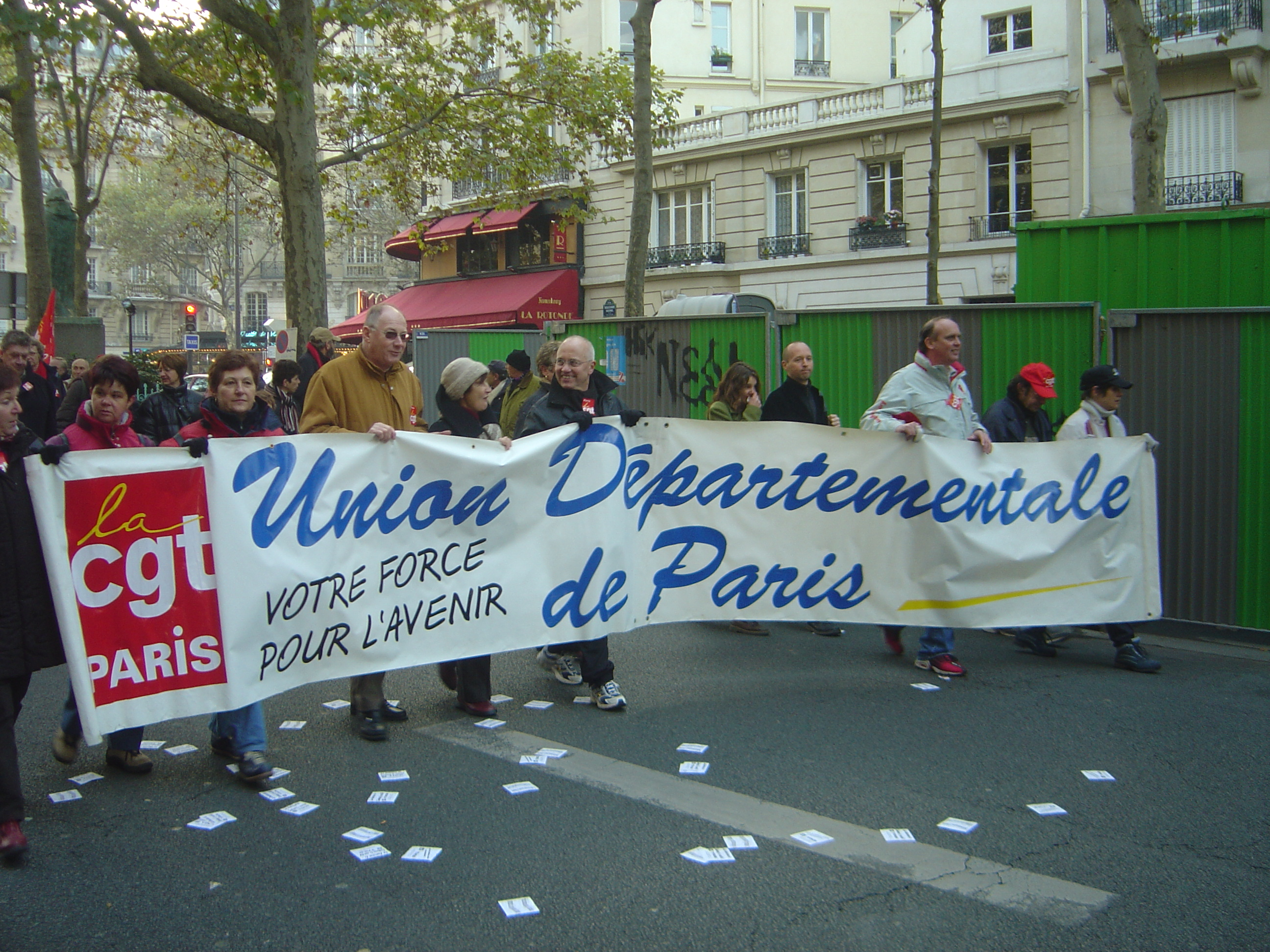
A CGT banner during a 2005 demonstration in Paris

The General Confederation of Labour (French: Confédération Générale du Travail, pronounced [kɔ̃fedeʁɑsjɔ̃ ʒeneʁal dy tʁavaj], CGT (Note: French pronunciation: [se ʒe te])) is a national trade union center, founded in 1895 in the city of Limoges. It is the first of the five major French confederations of trade unions.

It is the largest in terms of votes in the Labour Court elections (34.0% in the 2008 election), and second largest in terms of membership numbers.

Its membership decreased to 650,000 members in 1995–1996 (it had more than doubled when François Mitterrand was elected president in 1981), before increasing today to between 700,000 and 720,000 members, slightly fewer than the Confédération Française Démocratique du Travail (CFDT).

According to the historian M. Dreyfus, the direction of the CGT is slowly evolving, since the 1990s, during which it cut all organic links with the French Communist Party (PCF), in favour of a more moderate stance. The CGT is concentrating its attention, in particular since the 1995 general strikes, to trade-unionism in the private sector.

== History ==
The CGT was founded in 1895 in Limoges from the merger of the Fédération des bourses du travail (Federation of Labour Councils) and the Fédération nationale des syndicats (National Federation of Trade Unions). Auguste Keufer was amongst the founders and became the first treasurer.

At the end of Henri Krasucki's term (1982–1992), he began to distance himself from the French Communist Party (PCF). His successor, Louis Viannet, did the same, going as far as resigning from the political bureau of the party.

CGT General Secretary Phillipe Martinez announced that the union will support the week of climate action beginning on 20 September 2019.

In 2023, the CGT was involved in the interunion social movement against pension reform which organized strikes and protests in 300 towns across France, and wrote to Emmanuel Macron requesting negotiations, then, having not been received, mediation and a suspension of the 2023 French pension reform bill.

On 18 June 2024, the CGT called for a vote for the New Popular Front (NFP) in the 2024 French legislative elections. with the CGT General Secretary Sophie Binet also personally endorsing the NFP. Céline Verzeletti, a senior CGT member and General Secretary of the Federal Union of State Trade Unions, was nominated by the NFP for Paris's 15th constituency. The decision to endorse the NFP presented a turning point, since while the CGT has regularly called for a vote against the far right, in recent decades it has not called for people to vote for any specific party or bloc, due in part to the CGT's Amiens Charter — which recognizes the independence of trade unions from political parties.

== Africa ==
In 1937 CGT began organizing workers in French West Africa. The union's functioning was interrupted by its banning by the Vichy regime, but in 1943-1948 a process of reconstruction took place. The main centers of activity were Senegal, Ivory Coast, Togo and the French Soudan. CGT had an upper hand in the Muslim regions in comparison to the rival French Confederation of Christian Workers, who depended on the presence of Catholic communities for its recruitment. CGT emerged as the major trade union force amongst the 100 000 strong organized labour force in Senegal and Mauritania after the Second World War.

Within the CGT branches in the region, there was however a growing wish for independence. A leader of CGT in French West Africa, Bassirou Guèye, promoted this idea. At a meeting of the Territorial Union of Trade Unions in Senegal and Mauritania, held in Dakar 11 November – 12 November 1955, the majority of delegates voted for separation from the French CGT. A conference was held in Saint-Louis on 14 January – 15 January 1956 which formed the Confédération générale des travailleurs africains (CGTA), separating the parts of the West African CGT organizations from the French CGT. At the conference 50 out of 67 delegates had voted for separation.

In Togo, CGT had 45,100 members in 1948 (65% of organized labour). By 1952 the number had decreased to 34,000 (46% of organized labour).

CGT formed a branch in Madagascar in 1936.

== Publications ==
The CGT has two publications La Vie Ouvrière, and Le Peuple.

== Affiliated organisations ==
=== Federations ===
Affiliate	Abbreviation	Founded	Membership (2019)
Banking and Insurance Staff Unions Federation	FSBPA		
Commerce, Services and Distribution Federation		1973	44,980
Federation of Education, Research and Culture	FERC	1948	25,258
Federation of Employees in the Postal and Telecommunications Sector	FAPT	1919	49,346
Federation of Design Studios	FSE	1980	
Federation of Workers in the Book, Paper and Communication Industries	FILPAC	1982	
Finance Federation	Finances	1930	
General Federation of National Police Trade Unions		1946	
Health and Social Protection Federation	Santé	1979	74,725
Merchant Marine Officers' Federation	FOMM		
Metalworkers' Federation	FTM	1909	62,131
National Federation of Agri-Food and Forestry	FNAF	1981	22,701
National Federation of Chemical Industries	FNIC	1907	24,814
National Federation of Construction, Wood and Furniture Employees	FNSCBA	2011	
National Federation of Entertainment, Cinema, Audiovisual and Cultural Action Unions	FNSAC	1902	
National Federation of Equipment and the Environment	FNEE	1973	
National Federation of Glass and Ceramic Workers			
National Federation of Maritime Unions	FNSM	1905	
National Federation of Mines and Energy	FNME	1999	58,064
National Federation of Ports and Docks		1901	
National Federation of Staff of Social Organisations	Orgasociaux		
National Federation of State Workers	FNTE	1922	
National Union of Journalists	SNJ	1918	
Public Services Federation		1903	80,717
Railway Workers' Federation	Cheminots	1917	42,640
Temporary Staff Union	USI	1968	
Textile, Clothing, Leather and Laundry Federation	THCB	1985	
Transport Federation	FNST	1902	36,432

=== Other affiliates ===
- Federal Union of State Trade Unions (UFSE-CGT)
- General Union of Engineers, Managers and Technicians CGT (UGICT-CGT)
- Confederation of CGT retirees' union (UCR-CGT)
- Young CGT
- National Committee for the Fight and Defense of the Unemployed

=== Former federations ===
Affiliate	Abbreviation	Founded	Reason not affiliated	Year	Membership (1937)	Membership (1946)
Air, War and Navy Federation					16,000	15,000
Bridge and Road Engineers' Federation						
Clothing Federation		1892	Merged into THCB	1985	110,000	74,000
Commercial Travellers' Federation					6,000	20,000
Coopers' Federation					18,000	18,000
Designers' and Technicians' Federation			Dissolved	1945	79,000	N/A
Federation of Employees	FEC	1893	Joined FO	1947	285,000	200,000
Federation of Workers in the Wood, Furniture and Allied Industries			Merged into FNSCBA	2011		
French Federation of Book Workers	FFTL	1881	Merged into FILPAC	1982	60,000	55,000
General Administration Federation					23,000	?
Glass Federation					30,000	23,000
Hairdressers' Federation					22,000	20,000
Hatters' Federation					10,000	10,000
Jewellers', Goldsmiths' and Watchmakers' Federation					12,000	8,000
National Education Federation			Became independent	1947	101,000	150,000
National Federation of Agricultural Workers	FNTA	1920	Merged into FNAF	1981	156,000	290,000
National Federation of Ceramic, Faience, Pottery and Kindred Industries					36,000	20,000
National Federation of Construction Workers	FNTC	1920	Merged into FNSCBA	2011	540,000	700,000
National Federation of Energy	FNE	1905	Merged into FNME	1999	80,000	105,000
National Federation of Food, Hotels, Cafes and Restaurants			Merged into FNAF	1981	300,000	300,000
National Federation of Hides and Leather		1893	Merged into THCB	1985	88,000	86,000
National Federation of Miners	FNTSS	1883	Merged into FNME	1999	270,000	287,000
National Federation of Paper and Cardboard			Merged into FILPAC	1982	72,000	40,000
National Federation of Textile Industry Workers		1891	Merged into THCB	1985	360,000	270,000
Pharmaceutical Federation					47,000	19,000
Tobacco and Matchworkers' Federation		1948	Merged into FNAF	2008	14,000	12,000
Wood Federation						

== Leadership ==
=== General Secretaries ===
Year	Secretary
1895	Absalon Lagailse
1898	Maurice Copigneaux
1900	Victor Renaudin
1901	Eugène Guérard
1901	Victor Griffuelhes
1909	Louis Niel
1909	Léon Jouhaux
1945	Benoît Frachon and Léon Jouhaux
1948	Benoît Frachon and Alain Le Léap
1957	Benoît Frachon
1967	Georges Séguy
1982	Henri Krasucki
1992	Louis Viannet
1999	Bernard Thibault
2013	Thierry Lepaon
2015	Philippe Martinez
2023	Sophie Binet

== See also ==
- 1995 strikes in France
- List of trade unions
- Anarchism in France
- Politics of France
- CGT-SR
- Trade unions:
  - French Democratic Confederation of Labour
  - French Confederation of Christian Workers
  - Workers' Force
  - French Confederation of Management – General Confederation of Executives
  - Solidaires Unitaires Démocratiques
- Mouvement des Entreprises de France
