= 2005 in the United Kingdom =

Events from the year 2005 in the United Kingdom.

== Incumbents ==
- Monarch – Elizabeth II
- Prime Minister – Tony Blair (Labour)

== Events ==
=== January ===
- 1 January
  - New Year's celebrations all over the UK fall silent for two minutes as a mark of respect for those who died in the 2004 Indian Ocean tsunami.
  - The Freedom of Information Act 2000, the Environmental Information Regulations 2004 and the main provisions of the Child Trust Funds Act 2004 (introducing a Child Trust Fund with a government contribution for children that were born on or after 1 September 2002) come into force.
  - New Chip and PIN legislation comes into effect. It makes retailers liable for fraudulent transactions if they have failed to sign up to the scheme.
- 2 January – Operation Garron, the U.K. military aid effort for the victims of the 2004 Indian Ocean earthquake and tsunami, is launched.
- 5 January – Funeral of the Rt. Hon Sir Angus Ogilvy, husband of Princess Alexandra, The Hon Lady Ogilvy, takes place at St George's Chapel, Windsor Castle.
- 8 January
  - The BBC broadcasts Jerry Springer - The Opera despite receiving at least 45,000 complaints.
  - After a night of stormy weather, a ferry has run aground on Scotland's coast, with passengers remaining on board rather than evacuating in stormy weather. Extensive flooding has occurred in Carlisle as well as other locations in Britain and many homes are without power.
- 12 January – Britain's tallest self-supporting sculpture, the "B of the Bang", is unveiled in Manchester by Linford Christie.
- 13 January
  - Pictures of Prince Harry wearing a Nazi military uniform at a private "fancy dress" party are published in the newspapers.
  - Sir Mark Thatcher is fined 3,000,000 Rand (approximately £265,000), and receives a four-year suspended jail sentence after pleading guilty to supplying equipment to mercenaries for an attempted coup in Equatorial Guinea.
- 15 January – Conservative MP Robert Jackson, MP for Wantage, defects to the Labour Party.
- 20 January – Carolyn Leckie, a Member of the Scottish Parliament, is jailed for seven days for non-payment of a fine arising from a protest at Faslane nuclear base.
- 22 January – 61,000 people attended the concert in humanitarian aid of 2004 Indian Ocean tsunami victims at the Millennium Stadium in Cardiff, which raised over £1,250,000. Artists performing in the largest concert in Britain since Live Aid include Charlotte Church, Craig David, Goldie Lookin' Chain, Aled Jones, Badly Drawn Boy, Manic Street Preachers, Lulu, Eric Clapton, and Sting.
- 24 January – Hoaxer Christopher Pierson, who sent emails to relatives of people missing in the 2004 Indian Ocean tsunami from an AOL account purporting to be from the Foreign Office and claiming to confirm that the relatives were dead, is jailed for six months.
- 26 January
  - Closure due to flooding of Ellington Colliery at Ellington, Northumberland, the last remaining operational deep coal mine in North East England, and the last in the UK to extract coal from under the sea.
  - Four Britons returned to the UK after being detained at Guantanamo Bay for up to three years are released from police custody without charge.
  - Rodney Marsh, the former England national football star, is dismissed from his position as a pundit on Sky Sports because of a joke he made live on air concerning the 2004 Indian Ocean tsunami.
- 29 January – Chris Smith, the former Culture Secretary, reveals that he has been HIV positive for seventeen years.
- 31 January – A murder inquiry is launched in Belfast after 33-year-old Robert McCartney dies in hospital from injuries sustained in a pub brawl.

=== February ===
- 2 February
  - The Provisional Irish Republican Army issue a statement to the Republican newspaper An Phoblacht withdrawing from its commitment to the decommissioning of weapons and other deals related to the Northern Ireland peace process.
  - Robert Kilroy-Silk officially launches the Veritas political party, on an anti-immigration platform, after quitting the Eurosceptic UK Independence Party following a failed leadership bid.
- 6 February – Tony Blair becomes the longest-serving Labour Prime Minister, exceeding the combined record of Harold Wilson's two spells in power (1964–1970 and 1974–1976).
- 7 February – Ellen MacArthur attains the solo around the world sailing record, returning to Falmouth the following day. Although subsequently beaten, this remains a record for women (as of 2019).
- 9 February
  - Prime Minister Tony Blair issues a public apology to the eleven members of the Conlon and McGuire families who were wrongly convicted for the Guildford and Woolwich IRA pub bombings of 1974 when seven people were killed. The surviving members of the families were released in 1989 when the scientific evidence against them was discredited.
  - The British survey ship HMS Scott produces the first sonar survey of the seabed site of the 2004 Indian Ocean tsunami. Some images appear to show a landslide 100 metres high and 2 kilometres long.
- 10 February
  - The House of Commons passes the Identity Cards Bill at its third reading by 224 votes to 64, with a majority of 160. Most of the Conservative Party MPs abstain. 19 Labour MPs and 11 Conservative MPs defy the whip and vote against the bill, which now moves on to the House of Lords.
  - Clarence House announces that The Prince of Wales is to marry Camilla Parker Bowles on Friday 8 April in a civil ceremony at Windsor Castle. She will be styled "HRH The Duchess of Cornwall", and it was said if the Prince becomes King, "HRH The Princess Consort".
- 11 February – Prime Minister Tony Blair heralds what is described as the "officially unofficial" start to the general election campaign with a whistlestop tour of marginal constituencies, unveiling six election pledges.
- 14 February
  - Hare coursing: As the final Waterloo Cup event in England starts in Altcar, four anti-coursing protesters are arrested. The event is expected to attract up to 10,000 spectators over its three days.
  - London's Mayor Ken Livingstone is censured by the London Assembly for comparing a Jewish journalist for the Evening Standard to a concentration camp guard. Livingstone refuses to withdraw his comments.
- 15 February
  - Yusuf Islam, formerly known as Cat Stevens, receives substantial damages from two British newspapers, The Sun and The Sunday Times, which alleged that the United States was correct to ban him from the country. The Sun has published, and The Sunday Times will publish, acknowledgements that he is not, and never has been, involved in or supported terrorism, and that he abhors all such activities. They also highlight that Islam was recently presented with the Man for Peace award by a group of Nobel Peace Laureates.
  - The European Court of Human Rights deciding about the so-called McLibel case rules in favour of environmental campaigners Helen Steel and David Morris and their claim that their trial was unfair. The pair said their human rights were violated when their criticism of McDonald's was ruled libel. The case has taken fifteen years.
- 17 February
  - Irish police arrest four people in Cork and three in Dublin in raids concentrating on the financing of the Provisional IRA. Over £2,300,000 is seized in Cork, and £60,000 in Northern Bank notes believed to be from the £26,500,000 robbery in Belfast just before Christmas. Among the people arrested are reported to be a Sinn Féin councillor and someone working in the banking industry.
  - The BNFL nuclear plant at Sellafield, in the United Kingdom, reports that 30 kg (66 lb) of plutonium is "unaccounted for". This amount of missing plutonium would be sufficient to make seven atomic bombs. The UK Atomic Energy Authority states that the discrepancy in the record keeping is merely an auditing issue, and that there was no "real loss" of plutonium.
- 18 February
  - The UK Food Standards Agency orders the withdrawal of over 350 food products from sale following the discovery that a batch of chilli powder used to produce a batch of Worcestershire sauce subsequently used to produce processed foods was contaminated with the possibly-carcinogenic dye Sudan I.
  - The Hunting Act, the ban on hunting with dogs in England and Wales, comes into force. Opponents intend to challenge the new law and carry on hunting.
  - Mark Thatcher returns to court in Cape Town, South Africa, to answer charges about his involvement in an attempted coup in Equatorial Guinea.
  - Northern Bank robbery investigation:
    - Police Service of Northern Ireland (PSNI) recover a sum of money at a sports and social club in Belfast frequented by members of the PSNI. It is thought perhaps to be a diversion, but is being investigated.
    - A top Irish businessman and associate of the Taoiseach, Phil Flynn, steps down from a number of positions pending the outcome of a Garda Síochána investigation into Chesterton Finance, of which he is a non-executive director. He stepped down as chairman of a government body overseeing decentralisation, as well as giving up a position on the board of Vhi Healthcare and as chairman of the Bank of Scotland (Ireland).
    - A man is arrested by Gardaí near Passage West in Cork after he was discovered attempting to burn sterling banknotes.
    - Gardaí release two men who were being questioned in Dublin, as well as a Sinn Féin member in Cork. A suspected Real IRA member arrested at Heuston Station has been remanded in custody, as have four people arrested in Farran in County Cork.
    - Sinn Féin leader Gerry Adams denies any involvement on the part of his party with money laundering in the country. The Irish Government Minister for Justice, Equality and Law Reform Michael McDowell has described the IRA as a colossal crime machine laundering huge sums of money.
- 19 February – Police Service of Northern Ireland (PSNI) confirm that £50,000 in unused Northern Bank notes found at Newforge Country Club, a facility for off-duty and retired police officers, is from the Northern Bank robbery. Police still consider it a diversion.
- 21 February – The Royal Navy announces that it will allow same-sex couples to live in family quarters if they are in registered partnership.
- 23 February – Three British soldiers are found guilty of abusing Iraqi prisoners; on 25 February they are jailed for periods between five months and two years, and dismissed from the army. More British soldiers face the possibility of conviction.

=== March ===
- 1 March – The New Forest in Hampshire becomes England's twelfth national park.
- 2 March – Microsoft founder Bill Gates receives an honorary knighthood for contributions to enterprise in the UK and efforts to reduce world poverty.
- 3 March – Sinn Féin suspends seven members over their alleged involvement in the murder of Belfast man, Robert McCartney, who was killed on 30 January.
- 11 March – The Prevention of Terrorism Act receives the Royal Assent. This permits the Home Secretary to make control orders restricting the liberty of named individuals.
- 16 March – The Office for National Statistics reports that employment is at a record high of nearly 28,600,000 and that the number of unemployment benefit claimants has fallen to 813,300 – the lowest for thirty years. However, it also reveals that nearly 1,000,000 manufacturing jobs have been lost in eight years of Labour government. Critics claim that "real" job losses have been masked by an expansion of the public sector, with Shadow Chancellor Oliver Letwin describing the figures as "truly disturbing" and pointing out that 150,000 new jobs were created during the final three years of John Major's Conservative government.
- 24 March – The Constitutional Reform Act receives Royal Assent. This provides for the creation of a Supreme Court of the United Kingdom.
- 26 March
  - Doctor Who is revived as a TV series by the BBC, having been discontinued in December 1989, starring former Cracker actor Christopher Eccleston as the Doctor and pop star Billie Piper as his assistant Rose Tyler.
  - Former Prime Minister James Callaghan dies at his home in Ringmer, East Sussex, shortly before his 93rd birthday, making him the oldest ever former Prime Minister.

=== April ===
- 1 April – Sperm and egg donors in the UK will no longer have anonymity under new rules that come into force today, although the rules are not applied retrospectively.
- 4 April – The Gender Recognition Act 2004 comes into effect, allowing transsexual people to have their reassigned gender legally recognised by law.
- 5 April – The Prime Minister, Tony Blair, asks the Queen for a dissolution of Parliament for a general election on 5 May.
- 7 April
  - MG Rover, the last British-owned volume car maker, is placed into receivership.
  - Serious Organised Crime and Police Act 2005 provides for creation of the Serious Organised Crime Agency, extends and simplifies the powers of arrest of a constable, criminalises trespass at certain "protected sites" (official premises and nuclear sites), introduces restrictions on protests in the vicinity of the Houses of Parliament and amends the law on harassment.
  - Gambling Act 2005 transfers authority for licensing gambling from magistrates' courts to local authorities, creates the Gambling Commission, allows gambling companies to advertise on the broadcast media, regulates online gambling, provides for regional casinos and changes regulations for lotteries including on-product promotions.
- 9 April – The wedding of Prince Charles and Camilla Parker Bowles (who takes the title Duchess of Cornwall) in a twenty-minute ceremony at Windsor Guildhall is followed by a blessing at St George's Chapel, Windsor Castle.
- 15 April – Eight days after its going into receivership, administrators at carmaker MG Rover make redundant virtually all of the workforce, with over 6,000 job losses.
- 18 April – A body found in Théoule-sur-Mer near Cannes in France is proved to be that of Anthony Ashley-Cooper, 10th Earl of Shaftesbury, who had gone missing in November 2004.
- 21 April – Gaelic Language (Scotland) Act passed by the Scottish Parliament, the first piece of legislation in the UK to give formal recognition to the Scottish Gaelic language. It aims to secure Gaelic as an official language of Scotland, commanding "equal respect" with English, by establishing Bòrd na Gàidhlig within the framework of the government of Scotland (Royal Assent: 1 June).

=== May ===
- 3 May – The last MORI poll before the general election puts Labour five points ahead of the Conservatives on 38%, with most observers predicting a Labour victory with a significantly reduced majority.
- 4 May – Constantin Brâncuși's series of sculptures Bird in Space sells at Christie's auction house in London for the record amount of US$27,456,000.
- 5 May
  - 2005 general election: The Labour Party is returned to power for a third term, but with a greatly reduced majority of 66 seats. The Liberal Democrats win the most seats for any third party since 1923, with 62 MPs. Another new addition to Parliament is the Respect Party, who win their first MP, George Galloway; the ex-Labour MP gains the Bethnal Green and Bow seat in London from the Labour MP, Oona King.
  - A bomb explodes outside the British consulate in New York.
- 6 May – Conservative Party leader Michael Howard announces that he plans to resign "sooner rather than later" after being defeated in the general election.
- 7 May – Ulster Unionist Party leader David Trimble resigns as UUP leader after losing his seat at the general election.
- 9 May – The Sellafield nuclear plant's Thorp reprocessing facility in Cumbria is closed down due to the confirmation of a 20 tonne leak of highly radioactive uranium and plutonium fuel through a fractured pipe.
- 12 May – Malcolm Glazer gains control of Manchester United F.C. after securing a 70% share, ending more than thirty years of ownership by the Edwards family.
- 15 May – Anthony Ashley-Cooper, 11th Earl of Shaftesbury dies suddenly of a heart attack in New York City aged 27, only six months after succeeding his father.
- 17 May – George Galloway, newly elected Respect Party MP for Bethnal Green and Bow, appears before the United States Senate to defend himself against charges that he profited from Saddam Hussein's regime, launching a tirade against the Senators who had accused him and attacking the war in Iraq.
- 21 May – Arsenal become the first team to win the FA Cup on penalties, after they defeat Manchester United in a shootout that follows a nil-nil draw.
- 25 May – Liverpool F.C win their fifth European Cup, defeating A.C Milan on penalties following a 3–3 draw after extra time in Istanbul. Liverpool's victory is notable for a remarkable comeback from 0–3 down at half time to level the match.
- 27 May – Mark Hobson is sentenced to life imprisonment at Leeds Crown Court after admitting four charges of murder. On a killing spree in July last year, 35-year-old Hobson killed his girlfriend Claire Sanderson, her sister Diane Sanderson, as well as pensioners James and Joan Britton. The judge at the trial recommends that Hobson is never released from prison.
- 31 May – Bob Geldof announces plans for a concert, Live 8, similar to Live Aid, which took place in 1985, to coincide with the G8 Summit in Edinburgh this July.

=== June ===
- 1 June – Gaelic Language (Scotland) Act of the Scottish Parliament establishes Bòrd na Gàidhlig to secure the status of Scottish Gaelic as an official language of Scotland.
- 17 June – The Ugandan-born bishop of Birmingham, John Sentamu is named the new Archbishop of York. He is the first ever Black person to be appointed as an Archbishop of the Church of England.
- 23 June – Prince William of Wales graduates from the University of St Andrews.
- 24 June – The IRA apologises unreservedly to the family of fourteen-year-old Kathleen Feeney, whom they shot dead in Derry in November 1973. The IRA had previously blamed the British Army for the killing.
- 26 June – After 23 years presenting the channel 4 game show Countdown, Richard Whiteley dies aged 61 following treatment at Leeds General Infirmary.
- 28 June – In the Solent, the Queen conducts a Fleet Review of 167 naval, merchant and tall ships from the UK and 35 other nations to commemorate the bicentenary of the Battle of Trafalgar.

=== July ===
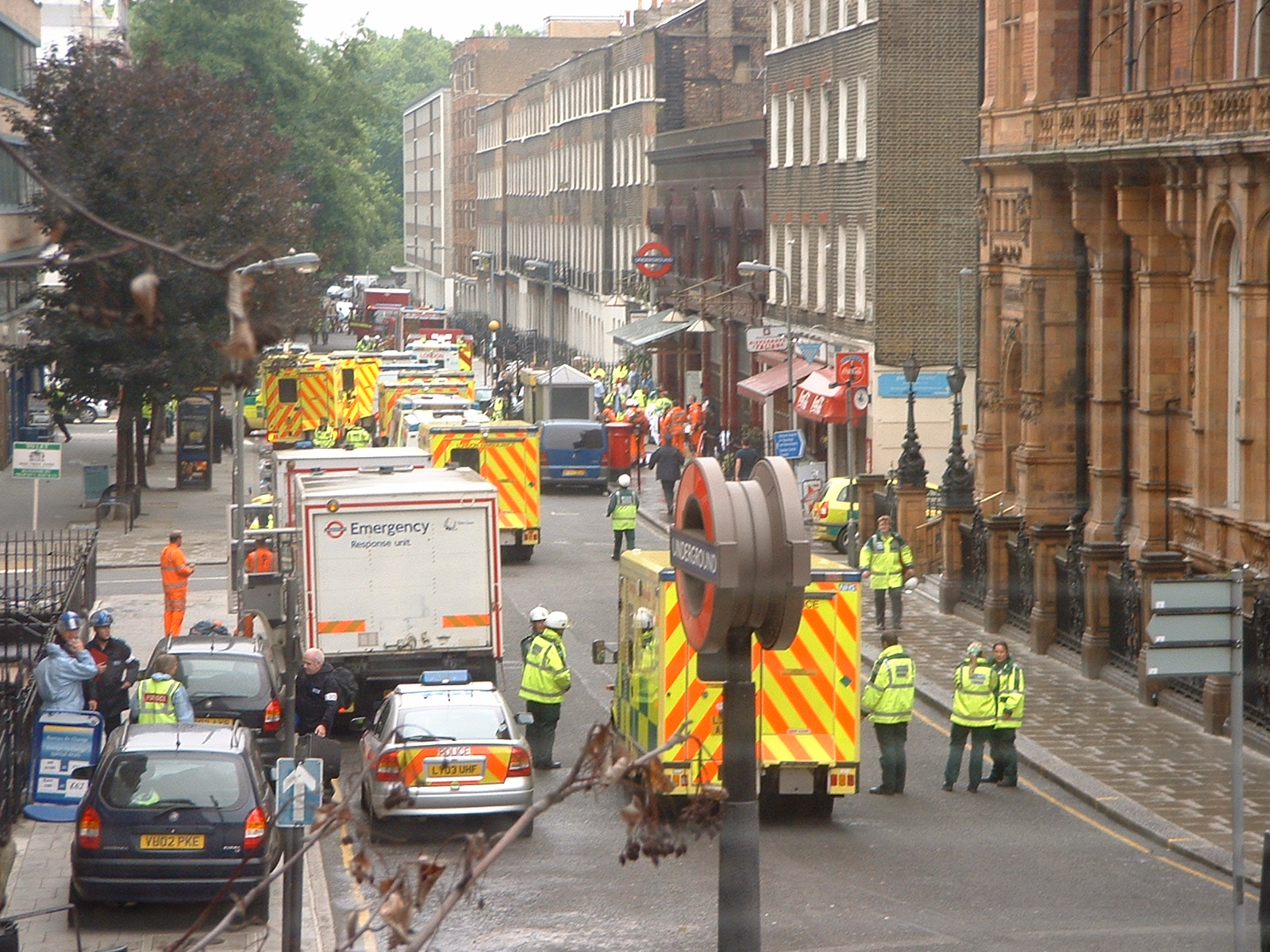
7/7: London emergency services at Russell Square

- 1 July – Tony Blair assumes the Presidency of the Council of the European Union.
- 2 July – Live 8 concerts are held.
- 5 July
  - Riots in Edinburgh by anti-capitalist and anti-G8 protesters.
  - Kenneth Regan and William Horncy are convicted at the Old Bailey of murdering millionaire Amarjit Chohan and four members of his family so they could use his freight business as a cover for importing drugs. The bodies of three victims were found washed up off Bournemouth and the Isle of Wight in the months after they disappeared from their Hounslow home in 2003.
- 6 July
  - London is chosen as the host city for the 2012 Olympic Games, beating Paris in the final round of votes 54 to 50.
  - The 31st G8 summit, hosted by the UK, begins at the Gleneagles Hotel in Perthshire.
  - Edinburgh 50,000 – The Final Push concert held in Edinburgh.
- 7 July – A series of co-ordinated terrorist bombings strike London's public transport system during the morning rush hour. Three bombs explode within fifty seconds of each other on three London Underground trains. A fourth bomb explodes on a bus an hour later in Tavistock Square. 52 civilians are killed and over 700 injured in the first Islamist terrorist attack in the UK.
- 11 July – Littlewoods sells its 119 stores across the UK to Associated British Foods in a £409,000,000 deal which will see them converted into Primark clothing stores and will mean that the Littlewoods name will vanish from high streets and shopping centres next year after 83 years, although Littlewoods will continue trading as a catalogue and an online retailer.
- 12 July – Southampton Institute of Higher Education becomes a university; on 15 August, it adopts the name Southampton Solent University.
- 14 July – A two-minute silence is held across Europe at 12:00 BST to remember the victims of the London bombings.
- 15 July – Nanjing Automobile Group of China completes a takeover of bankrupt British carmaker MG Rover, and hopes to start producing cars at Longbridge from next year, with some production also taking place in China.
- 17 July
  - The Duchess of Cornwall is granted a Royal coat of arms by the Earl Marshal of the College of Arms.
  - Former Prime Minister Edward Heath dies of pneumonia aged 89 at Arundells, his home near Salisbury, Wiltshire. On 25 July his funeral takes place at Salisbury Cathedral, where he is laid to rest.
- 18 July – Psychedelic mushrooms are criminalised.
- 21 July – Four attempted bomb attacks in London disrupt part of the capital's public transport. Small explosions occur around midday at Shepherd's Bush, Warren Street and Oval stations on London Underground, and on a bus in Bethnal Green. However, there are no injuries.
- 22 July
  - The Metropolitan Police fatally shoot Jean Charles de Menezes, mistakenly believing him to be one of the previous day's would-be suicide bombers.
  - Tower of St Edmundsbury Cathedral at Bury St Edmunds completed.
- 28 July
  - The Provisional IRA orders an end to its armed campaign, and will focus solely on democratic politics.
  - A memorial service is held for both James Callaghan and his wife Audrey at Westminster Abbey.
  - Birmingham tornado of 2005: F2 tornado hits Birmingham at about 14:40. 19 people are hurt, some seriously.
- 29 July
  - Two of the suspects of the attempted 21 July London bombings are arrested in North Kensington; the fourth suspect is arrested in Rome.
  - Killing of Richard Whelan, who is stabbed in London by a man mistakenly released from custody earlier in the day.
- 30 July – Murder of Anthony Walker, who is killed in Merseyside by two men in an unprovoked, racially motivated attack.

=== August ===
- 11 August – British Airways grounds all flights as baggage handlers, loaders and bus drivers strike in support of 800 employees sacked by flight catering company Gategourmet. The strike is also affecting other airlines, causing chaos at Heathrow Airport.
- 12 August
  - Robin Cook, Labour MP and former Foreign Secretary, collapses from a heart attack while walking down Ben Stack in Sutherland, Scotland. He is taken to a hospital in Inverness, where he is declared dead, aged 59.
  - Radical Islamic preacher Omar Bakri Mohammed is barred from returning to the UK after Home Secretary Charles Clarke cancels the indefinite leave to return Mohammed was given, after claiming asylum in 1986.
- 19 August – Former Northern Ireland Secretary Mo Mowlam dies of cancer in Canterbury, Kent, aged 55.
- 20 August – The Ricoh Arena, a 32,500-seat multi-purpose stadium in Coventry, is opened. Owned by the local council, Coventry City F.C. are its key tenants and it is also likely to be used as a concert venue. Japanese electrical goods manufacturer Ricoh purchased the stadium's naming rights in a multimillion-pound deal last year.
- 21 August – Victory over Japan Day: A service is held at London's Cenotaph to mark the sixtieth anniversary of the end of World War II. Charles, Prince of Wales is in attendance, as are survivors of the Far East campaign.

=== September ===
- 12 September – England cricket team wins The Ashes at home.
- 14 September – Secretary of State for Northern Ireland, Peter Hain, announces that the government no longer recognises loyalist paramilitary group the Ulster Volunteer Force's ceasefire, due to the UVF's on-going feud with the Loyalist Volunteer Force, and recent violence against the police.
- 26 September – Head of the Independent International Commission on Decommissioning, general John de Chastelain announces in a Belfast press conference that the arsenal of the Provisional Irish Republican Army has been "put beyond use", including guns, ammunition, mortars and explosives.
- 29 September
  - 2005 Livingston by-election: Jim Devine retains the seat for Labour; though with a reduced majority in the face of a swing of 10.2% to the SNP.
  - The High Court decides that Ian Huntley, serving life imprisonment for the Soham Murders three years ago, should serve at least forty years in prison before being considered for parole. This ruling is set to keep Huntley behind bars until at least 2042 and the age of 68.

=== October ===
- 3 October
  - The United Kingdom welcomed the decision to begin European Union accession negotiations with Croatia and Turkey.
  - Actor and comedian Ronnie Barker dies of heart failure in a hospice in Oxfordshire, aged 76.
- 5 October – Three perpetrators of the racially motivated murder of Glasgow teenager Kriss Donald, arrive in Scotland to face trial after a one-off extradition agreement negotiated with Pakistan.
- 17–18 October – National Waterfront Museum in Swansea, designed by Wilkinson Eyre, opens.
- 17 October – The Conservative Party begin voting on a new leader following the resignation of Michael Howard, who stepped down after being defeated at the general election in May.
- 18 October – The landmark Spinnaker Tower in Portsmouth opens. At 170 metres (560 ft) it is the tallest accessible structure in the UK outside London.

=== November ===
- 1 November – Charles, Prince of Wales and Camilla, Duchess of Cornwall arrive in the United States for a state visit, their first overseas visit since their marriage.
- 5 November – Britain's quadricentennial Guy Fawkes Night is celebrated, 400 years to the day of the Gunpowder Plot.
- 8 November – 2,000 people attend a memorial service for Edward Heath in Westminster Abbey.
- 9 November – The Government loses a key House of Commons vote on detaining terrorism suspects for ninety days without charge, in the report stage of the Terrorism Bill.
- 13 November – Andrew Stimpson, a 25-year-old man from Scotland, is reported as the first person proven to have been "cured" of HIV.
- 21 November – Alfred Anderson, one of the last surviving First World War veterans and the oldest man in Scotland, dies at the age of 109. He was also the last known survivor of the 1914 Christmas truce. There are now only approximately twenty surviving British veterans of the conflict, all over 100 years of age.
- 24 November
  - Pubs in England and Wales permitted to open for 24 hours for the first time.
  - The Safeway name disappears from Britain after 43 years with the rebranding of the last remaining store by its owner Morrisons, which took over the supermarket chain in March 2004.
- 25 November – The footballing world mourns George Best, the legendary former Manchester United and Northern Ireland player who dies from multiple organ failure in London following a seven-week illness at the age of 59. Best, an alcoholic for more than thirty years, had been admitted to hospital in early October suffering from an infection brought on by anti-rejection drugs that he had been taking since a liver transplant in 2002.
- 30 November – Quadruple killer Mark Hobson loses a High Court appeal against his trial judge's recommendation that he should never be released from prison.

=== December ===
- 6 December – David Cameron, 39-year-old MP for Witney in Oxfordshire, is elected as Leader of the Conservative Party, defeating David Davis.
- 9 December – The last Routemaster buses in regular service in London run, on route 159.
- 10 December – Harold Pinter wins the Nobel Prize in Literature "who in his plays uncovers the precipice under everyday prattle and forces entry into oppression's closed rooms".
- 11 December – Hertfordshire Oil Storage Terminal fire: explosions tear through Buncefield oil storage facility located near Hemel Hempstead in Hertfordshire.
- 12 December – New Conservative Party leader David Cameron's hopes of becoming the next UK Prime Minister are boosted when an Ipsos MORI opinion poll puts his party two points ahead of Labour on 37%.
- 19 December – The Civil Partnership Act 2004 comes into force, granting same-sex couples similar legal rights to those of married heterosexuals. The first civil partnership in the United Kingdom under the normal application of the new rules is registered at Belfast City Hall between Shannon Sickles and Grainne Close. The first partnerships in Scotland are registered on 20 December and in England on 21 December.
- 22 December – Tony Blair makes a surprise visit to British forces in Iraq.

=== Undated ===
- Summer – Guinness closes its Park Royal brewery in London.
- International Biosciences, a UK-based DNA testing company is founded.
- Internet access among the UK population has reached 70% (more than 40,000,000 people).

== Publications ==
- Kazuo Ishiguro's novel Never Let Me Go
- Marina Lewycka's novel A Short History of Tractors in Ukrainian
- Paul McKenna's self-help book I Can Make You Thin
- Terry Pratchett's Discworld novel Thud!
- J. K. Rowling's novel Harry Potter and the Half-Blood Prince
- Sarah Waters ' novel The Night Watch

== Births ==
- 2 January – Robbie Lee, British diver
- 4 January – Dafne Keen, British and Spanish actress
- February – Alma Deutscher, composer, pianist and violinist
- 25 February – Noah Jupe, English actor (The Night Manager, Suburbicon, Wonder, A Quiet Place)
- 26 March – Countess Luana of Orange-Nassau, Jonkvrouwe van Amsberg
- 5 April – Bleu Landau, English actor (EastEnders)
- 9 September – Daisy Waite, English-Chinese actress, model and presenter

== Deaths ==
=== January ===
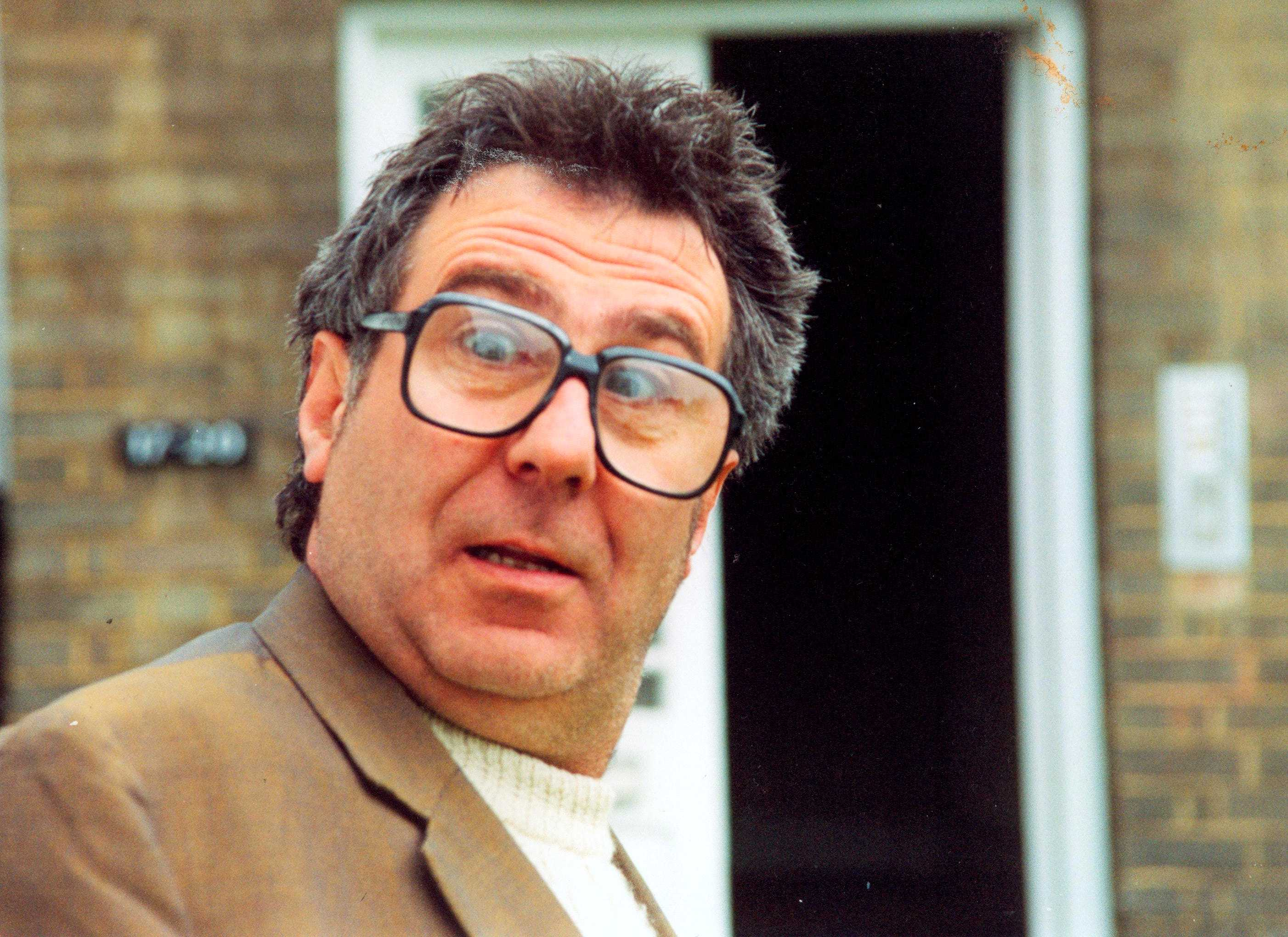
Malcolm Hardee

- 2 January
  - Bernard Barrell, composer (born 1919)
  - Cyril Fletcher, comedian (born 1913)
- 3 January
  - Edward Britton, trade unionist (born 1909)
  - Kay Williamson, linguist (born 1935)
- 4 January – Humphrey Carpenter, writer and radio broadcaster (born 1946)
- 5 January – Gabrielle Daye, actress (born 1911)
- 6 January – Nicholas Scott, politician (born 1933)
- 10 January
  - Stephen Hastings, politician (born 1921)
  - Erwin Hillier, cinematographer (born 1911 in Germany)
- 12 January – Bernard Meadows, modernist sculptor (born 1915)
- 14 January – Conroy Maddox, painter (born 1912)
- 15 January – Felix Aprahamian, music critic (born 1914)
- 17 January – George P. L. Walker, geologist (born 1926)
- 18 January
  - Gabrielle Brune, actress (born 1912)
  - Vivian H. H. Green, priest and historian (born 1915)
- 20 January – Dame Miriam Rothschild, zoologist, entomologist, and author (born 1908)
- 22 January
  - Sir William Deakin, World War II hero, historian and founder of St Antony's College, Oxford (born 1913)
  - Patsy Rowlands, actress (Carry On films) (born 1931)
- 23 January
  - Morys Bruce, 4th Baron Aberdare, peer and politician (born 1919)
  - Eddie Sinclair, Scottish snooker player (born 1937)
- 28 January – Jim Capaldi, guitarist and lead singer (Traffic) (born 1944)
- 29 January – Eric Griffiths, guitarist (The Quarrymen) (born 1940)
- 30 January
  - Susan Bradshaw, pianist (born 1931)
  - Sir Horace Law, admiral (born 1911)
- 31 January
  - Malcolm Hardee, comedian (accident) (born 1950)
  - Ivan Noble, translator and journalist (born 1967)

=== February ===
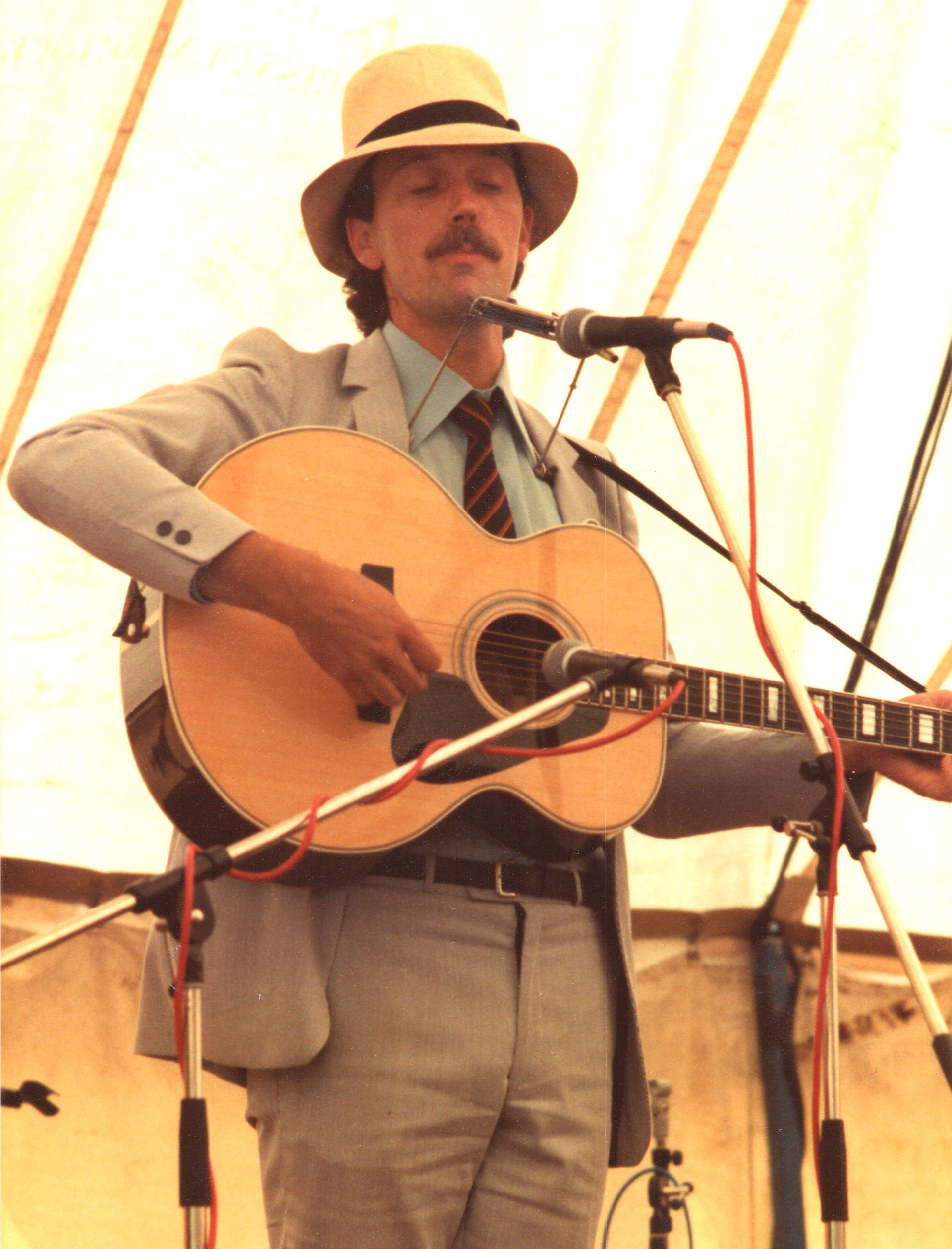
Brian Cookman

- 1 February – Richard Wolfson, musician and journalist (born 1955)
- 2 February – Sir Edward Wright, mathematician (born 1906)
- 5 February – Gerard Glaister, television producer (born 1915)
- 7 February – Penelope Aitken, socialite and political hostess (born 1910)
- 9 February – Kate Peyton, journalist (murdered in Somalia) (born 1965)
- 10 February – Dave Goodman, record producer (born 1951)
- 11 February – Stan Richards, actor (born 1930)
- 12 February
  - Archie Butterworth, racing car designer (born 1912)
  - Sir John Dacie, haematologist (born 1912)
- 13 February – Harry Baird, actor (born 1931 in British Guiana)
- 15 February
  - Richard Grunberger, historian (born 1924 in Austria)
  - David Leach, potter (born 1911)
- 16 February – Michael McCrum, academic (born 1924)
- 18 February – Brian Cookman, musician and composer (born 1946)
- 20 February – William Gordon Harris, civil engineer (born 1912)
- 24 February
  - Robin Jenkins, writer (born 1912)
  - Leonard Miall, broadcaster (born 1914)
  - Glanmor Williams, Welsh historian (born 1920)
- 25 February
  - Peter Benenson, lawyer and founder of Amnesty International (born 1921)
  - Phoebe Hesketh, poet (born 1909)
- 26 February – Max Faulkner, golfer (born 1916)
- 28 February
  - Chris Curtis, drummer (The Searchers) (born 1941)
  - Richard A. Fletcher, historian (born 1944)

=== March ===
Audrey Callaghan

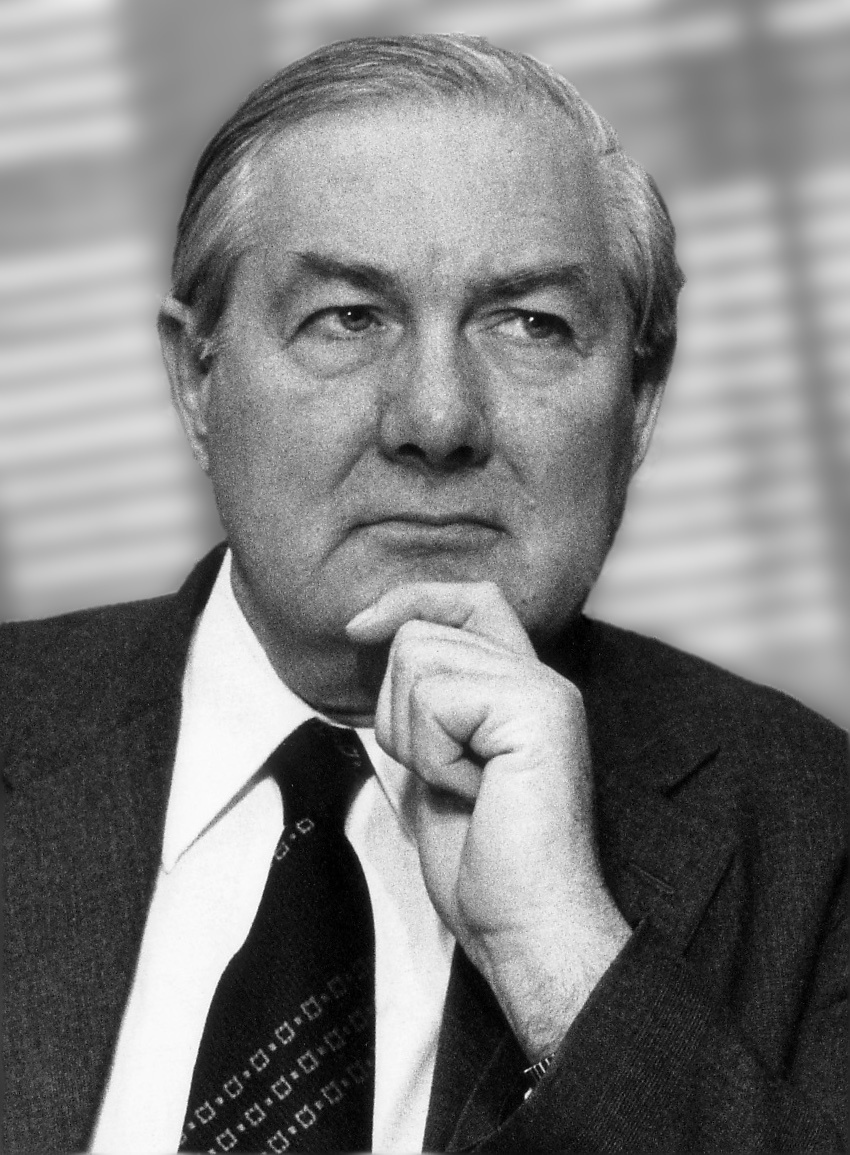
James Callaghan

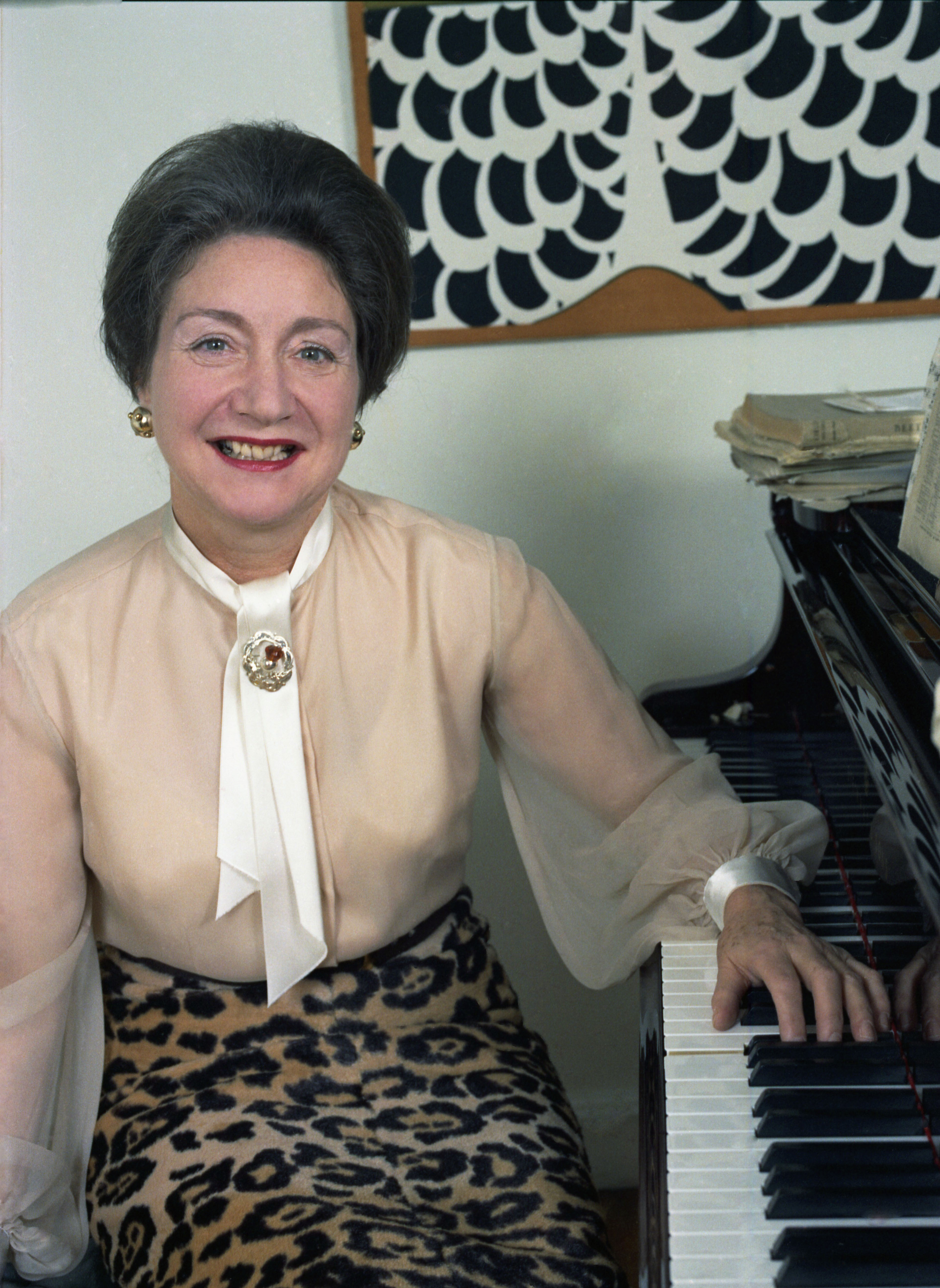
Moura Lympany

- 5 March
  - George Worsley Adamson, book illustrator (born 1913 in the United States)
  - David Sheppard, cricketer and Bishop of Liverpool (born 1929)
- 6 March – Tommy Vance, radio and television presenter (born 1940)
- 7 March – John Box, film production designer (born 1920)
- 8 March
  - Ross Benson, journalist (born 1948)
  - Alice Thomas Ellis, writer (born 1932)
- 9 March
  - Meredith Davies, orchestral conductor (born 1922)
  - Sheila Gish, actress (born 1942)
- 11 March
  - Humphrey Spender, photojournalist (born 1910)
  - Cherry Drummond, 16th Baroness Strange, peeress and photographer (born 1928)
- 14 March
  - Janet Reger, lingerie designer (born 1935)
  - Simon Webb, chess player (murdered in Sweden) (born 1955)
- 15 March
  - Audrey Callaghan, wife of former prime minister James Callaghan (born 1913)
  - Bill McGarry, English footballer and football manager (Wolves) (born 1927)
- 16 March
  - William Brown, bridge designer (born 1928)
  - Ralph Erskine, architect (born 1914)
- 17 March – Sir Jeremy Blacker, Army general (born 1939)
- 20 March
  - David Dunhill, radio announcer (born 1917)
  - Leslie Porter, businessman (born 1920)
- 21 March – Stanley Sadie, musicologist and critic (born 1930)
- 22 March – Rod Price, guitarist (Foghat) (born 1947)
- 23 March – David Kossoff, actor, father of Paul Kossoff (born 1919)
- 26 March – James Callaghan, former Prime Minister (born 1912)
- 28 March
  - Dave Freeman, scriptwriter (Benny Hill, Carry On films, etc.) (born 1922)
  - Dame Moura Lympany, classical pianist (born 1916)
- 30 March – Eric Roll, Baron Roll of Ipsden, economist, public servant and banker (born 1907 in Austria-Hungary)
- 31 March – Alan Bloom, horticulturalist (born 1906)

=== April ===
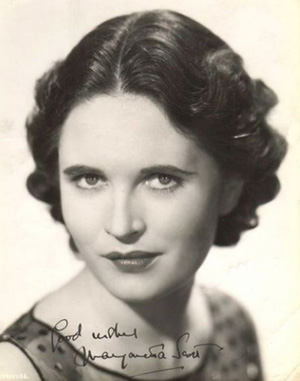
Margaretta Scott

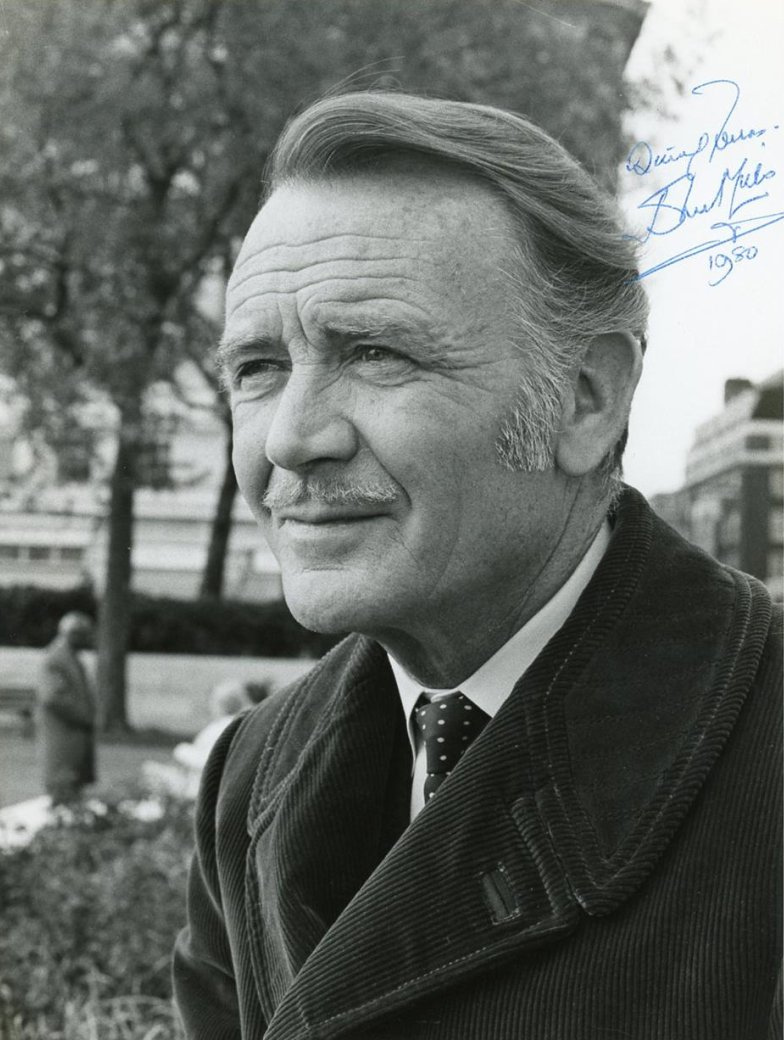
John Mills

- 2 April – Trevor Foster, rugby union player (born 1914)
- 7 April – Cliff Allison, racing driver (born 1932)
- 8 April – Douglas Northcott, mathematician (born 1916)
- 11 April
  - John Bennett, actor (born 1928)
  - John Brosnan, writer and film critic (born 1947 in Australia)
  - David Hughes, novelist (born 1930)
- 13 April
  - Simon Blumenfeld, writer (born 1907)
  - Julia Darling, novelist (born 1956)
- 15 April – Margaretta Scott, actress (born 1912)
- 16 April – Kay Walsh, actress and dancer (born 1911)
- 18 April – Donald Bruce, Baron Bruce of Donington, soldier, businessman and politician (born 1912)
- 21 April
  - Gwynfor Evans, politician, Plaid Cymru's first MP (born 1912)
  - Cyril Tawney, singer-songwriter (born 1930)
- 22 April
  - Norman Bird, actor (born 1924)
  - Sir Eduardo Paolozzi, sculptor (born 1924)
- 23 April – Sir John Mills, actor (born 1908)
- 25 April – Alexander Trotman, Baron Trotman, businessman, CEO of Ford Motor Company (1993–1998) (born 1933)
- 26 April
  - Michael Coles, actor (born 1934)
  - Gordon Campbell, Baron Campbell of Croy, politician (born 1921)
- 27 April – Stan Orme, Baron Orme, politician (born 1923)
- 28 April
  - Douglas Johnson, historian (born 1925)
  - P. D. Orton, mycologist (born 1916)
- 29 April – Johnnie Stewart, TV producer, founder of Top of the Pops (born 1917)
- 30 April – Ron Todd, trade unionist (born 1927)

=== May ===
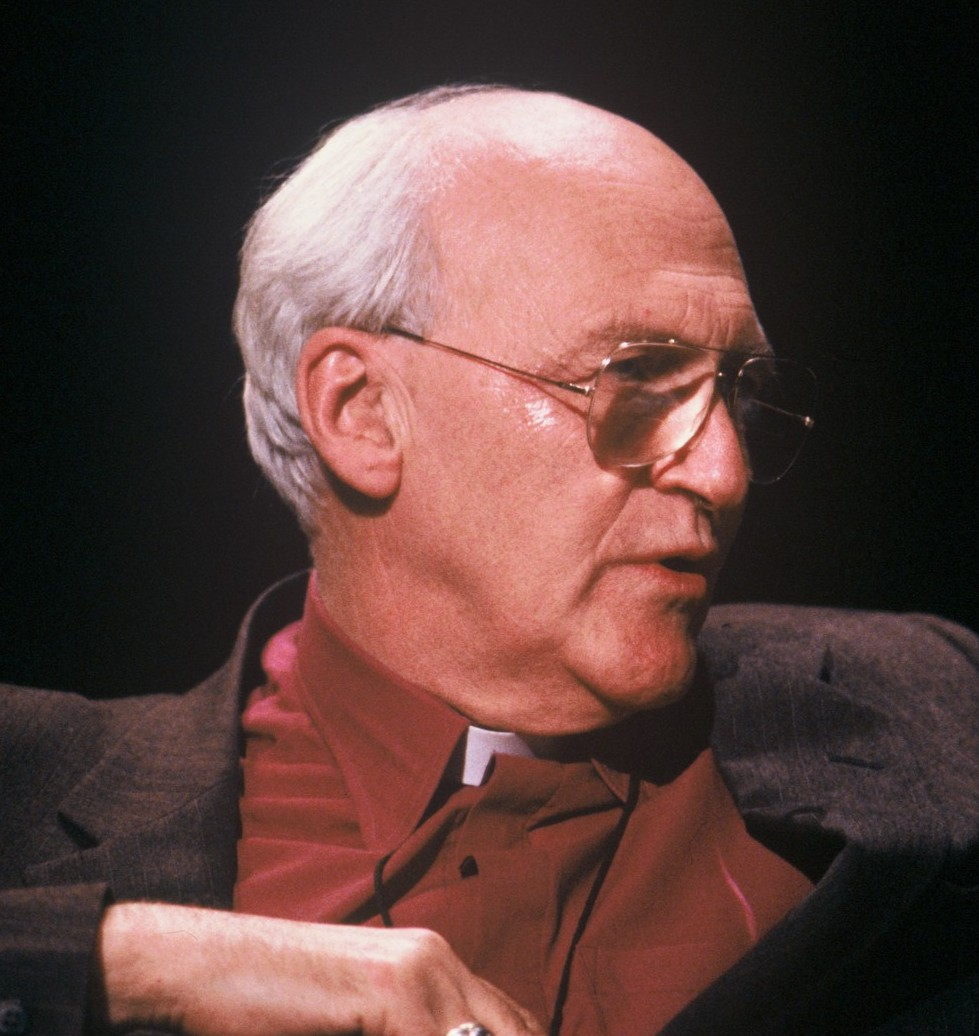
Hugh Montefiore

- 2 May – David Tyrrell, virologist (born 1925)
- 4 May – Joyce Lambert, botanist and ecologist (born 1916)
- 9 May
  - Charles Morrison, politician (born 1932)
  - Tiny Wharton, football referee (born 1927)
- 12 May – Martin Lings, Islamic scholar (born 1909)
- 13 May – Hugh Montefiore, Anglican prelate, Bishop of Birmingham (1978–1987) (born 1920)
- 14 May – Mary Treadgold, author and BBC producer (born 1910)
- 15 May – Anthony Ashley-Cooper, 11th Earl of Shaftesbury, peer (born 1977)
- 16 May
  - Rees Davies, historian (born 1938)
  - Albert "Smiler" Marshall, World War I veteran, last British cavalryman of the Western Front (born 1897)
- 18 May – Denis Wright, diplomat (born 1911)
- 20 May – Richard Q. Twiss, astronomer (born 1920 in India)
- 21 May – Bedford Jezzard, English footballer (born 1927)
- 23 May
  - Derek Ratcliffe, conservationist (born 1929)
  - Billy Smart Jr., circus performer (born 1934)
- 24 May – Ismail Merchant, film producer (born 1936 in India)
- 25 May – Robert Jankel, coachbuilder and vehicle designer (born 1938)
- 27 May – Fay Godwin, photographer (born 1931)
- 29 May
  - Patsy Calton, politician (born 1948)
  - Sir Frederick Page, aircraft designer (born 1917)
- 31 May – John Aiken, air marshal (born 1921)

=== June ===
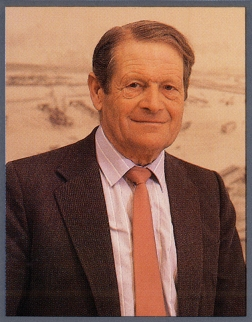
Allan Beckett

- 1 June – Geoffrey Toone, actor (born 1910 in Ireland)
- 2 June – Melita Norwood, Cold War spy (born 1912)
- 3 June – Michael Billington, actor (born 1941)
- 6 June
  - Pamela May, ballerina and ballet teacher (born 1917 in Trinidad)
  - Mary Beaumont Medd, architect (born 1907)
- 10 June – Nick Darke, playwright (born 1948)
- 11 June – Audrey Brown, Olympic athlete (born 1913)
- 13 June – Jonathan Adams, actor (born 1931)
- 14 June
  - N. J. Crisp, television writer, dramatist and novelist (born 1923)
  - Lionel Elvin, educationist (born 1905)
- 16 June
  - Gerald Davis, philatelist (born 1916)
  - Alex McAvoy, Scottish actor (born 1928)
- 17 June – James A. Whyte, Church of Scotland minister and theologian (born 1920)
- 18 June – Basil Kirchin, musician and composer (born 1927)
- 19 June – Allan Beckett, civil engineer (born 1914)
- 21 June – Geoffrey Jones, documentary maker (born 1931)
- 22 June – William Donaldson, satirist (born 1935)
- 26 June – Richard Whiteley, television presenter and journalist (born 1943)
- 27 June
  - Domino Harvey, bounty hunter (overdose) (born 1969)
  - Ray Holmes, fighter pilot and hero of the Battle of Britain (born 1914)
- 28 June – Philip Hobsbaum, teacher, poet and critic (born 1932)
- 29 June – John D. Burgess, bagpiper (born 1934)
- 30 June – Christopher Fry, playwright (born 1907)

=== July ===
Edward Heath

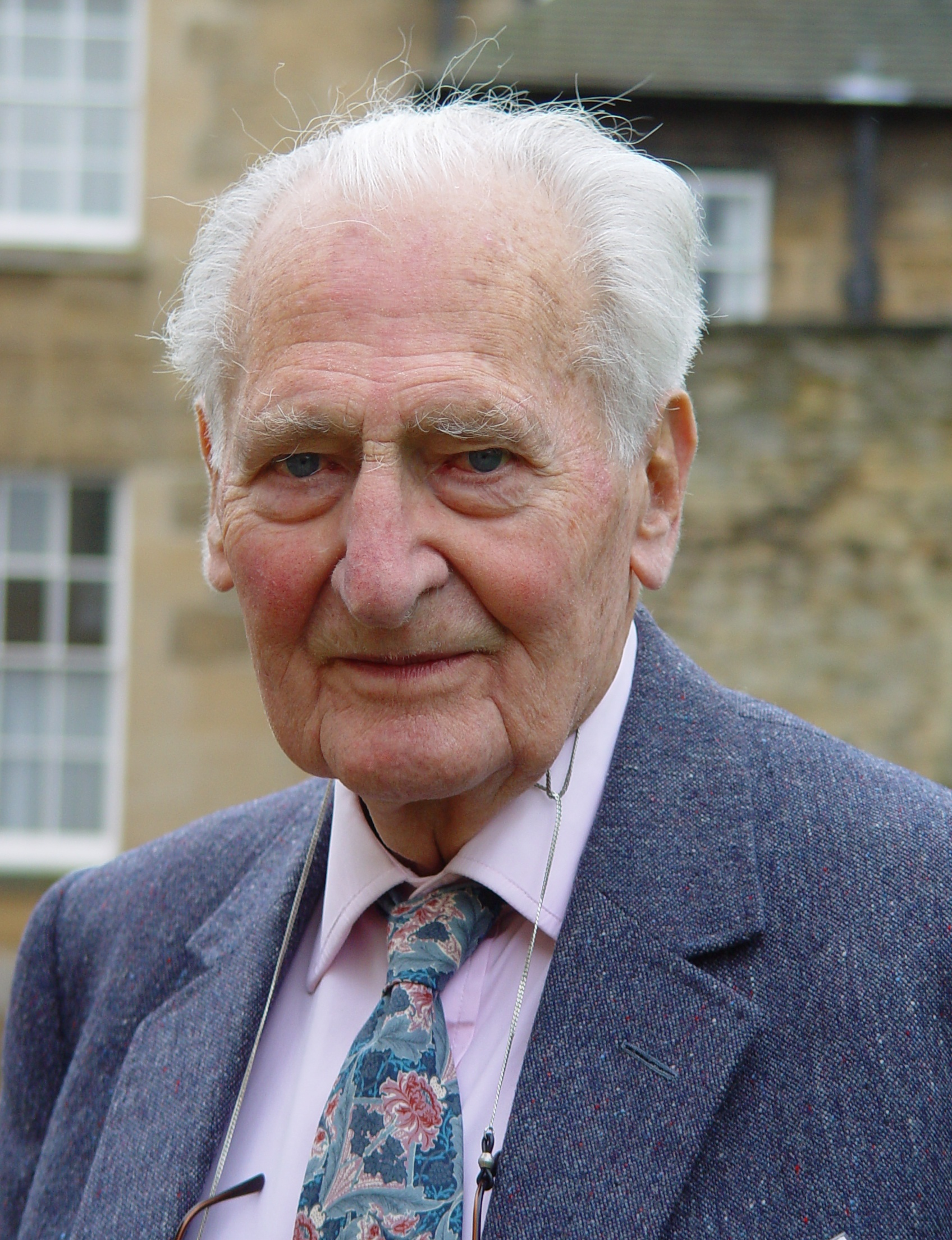
Richard Doll

- 4 July – Bryan Coleman, actor (born 1911)
- 7 July – Giles Vernon Hart, trade unionist and telephone engineer (born 1949; killed in the 7 July 2005 London bombings)
- 10 July – A. J. Quinnell, writer (born 1940)
- 11 July – Gretchen Franklin, actress (born 1911)
- 12 July
  - John King, Baron King of Wartnaby, businessman, CEO of British Airways (1981–1993) (born 1917)
  - John Thorley, Welsh rugby union and rugby league footballer (born 1927)
- 14 July – Dame Cicely Saunders, nurse, social worker, physician and writer (born 1918)
- 15 July – David Daiches, literary critic (born 1912)
- 17 July – Sir Edward Heath, former Prime Minister (born 1916)
- 19 July – John Tyndall, fascist who was involved in the formation of both the National Front and the British National Party (born 1934)
- 20 July
  - Josefina de Vasconcellos, sculptor (born 1904)
  - David Tomblin, film director (born 1930)
- 21 July
  - Long John Baldry, blues singer (born 1941)
  - Alfred Hayes, wrestler and wrestling announcer (born 1928)
  - Ian Robertson, Lord Robertson, Scottish judge (born 1912)
- 24 July
  - Sir Richard Doll, epidemiologist, first person to link cigarette smoking and lung cancer (born 1912)
  - Fraser McLuskey, Church of Scotland minister (born 1914)
- 25 July
  - Paul Britten Austin, writer and broadcaster (born 1922)
  - David Jackson, actor (born 1934)
- 26 July – Betty Astell, actress (born 1912)
- 29 July – Hermione Hammond, painter (born 1910)

=== August ===
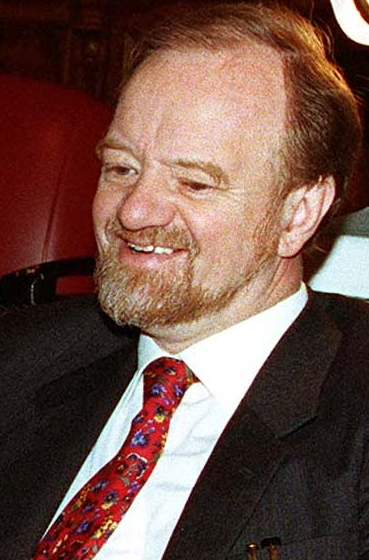
Robin Cook

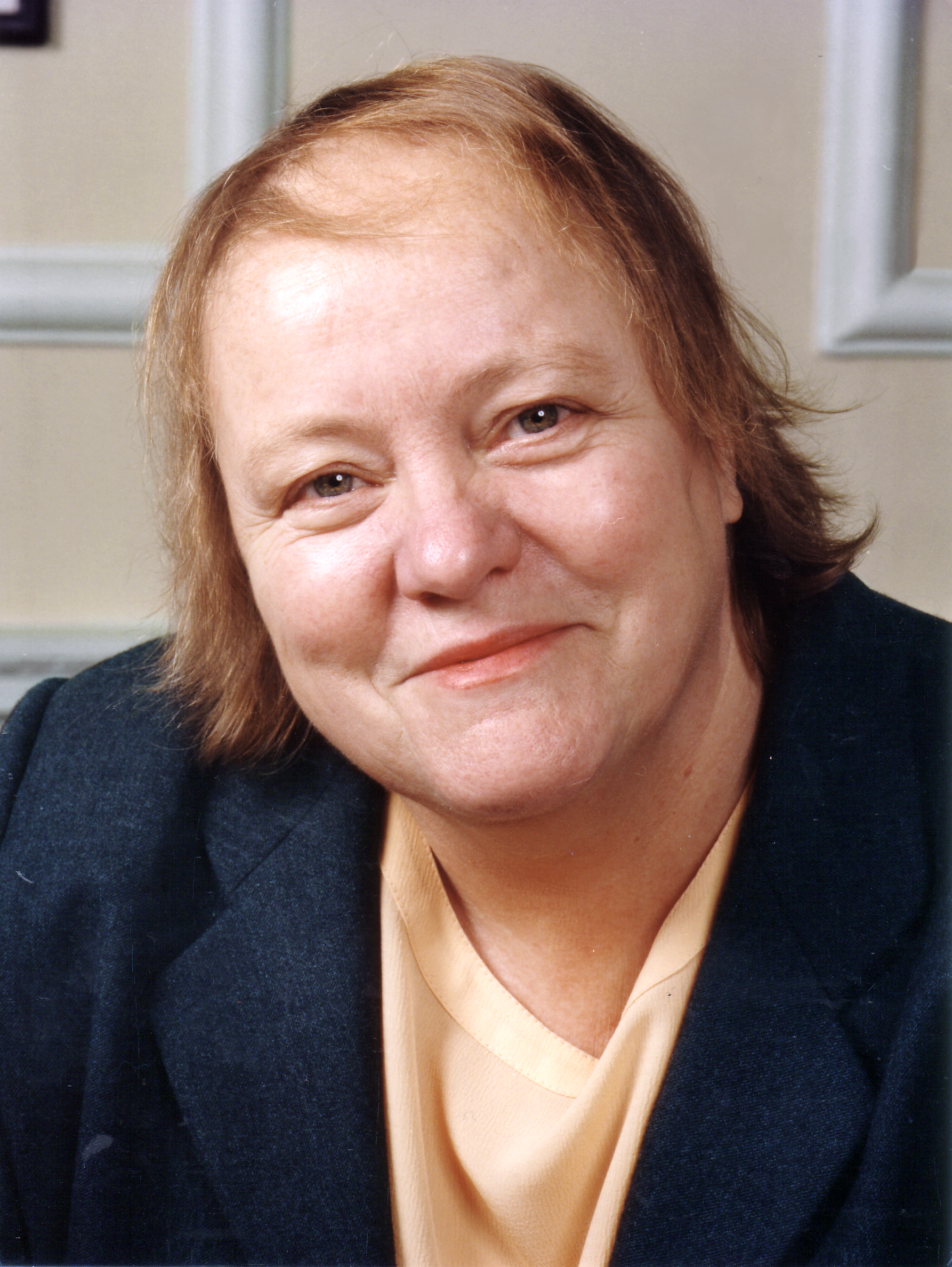
Mo Mowlam

- 1 August – Colin McEvedy, scholar, historian and author (born 1930)
- 4 August – Peter Cundy, World War II pilot (born 1916)
- 6 August
  - Robin Cook, politician, Foreign Secretary (1997–2001) (born 1946)
  - Carlo Little, drummer (born 1938)
- 11 August – James Booth, actor (Zulu) (born 1927)
- 12 August – John Loder, sound engineer and record producer (born 1946)
- 13 August – Arnold Cooke, composer (born 1906)
- 14 August – Gordon Oakes, politician (born 1931)
- 16 August
  - William Corlett, author (born 1938)
  - Derek Page, Baron Whaddon, politician (born 1927)
- 19 August – Mo Mowlam, politician, Secretary of State for Northern Ireland (1997–1999) (born 1949)
- 21 August – Polly Hill, social anthropologist of West Africa (born 1914)
- 22 August
  - Elizabeth Knight, actress (born 1944)
  - Geoffrey Lane, Baron Lane, judge and former Lord Chief Justice (born 1918)
  - Juliet Pannett, portrait painter (born 1911)
- 24 August
  - Maurice Cowling, historian (born 1926)
  - Jack Slipper, Metropolitan Police detective (born 1924)
- 25 August
  - Terence Morgan, actor (born 1921)
  - Eleanor Warren, cellist (born 1919)
- 26 August – Gerry Fitt, Baron Fitt, politician (born 1926)
- 29 August – Sybil Marshall, writer and broadcaster (born 1913)
- 31 August
  - Sir Joseph Rotblat, physicist, Nobel laureate, anti-nuclear weapons campaigner and founder of Pugwash Conferences (born 1908 in Poland)
  - H. W. F. Saggs, classicist and orientalist (born 1920)
  - Michael Sheard, actor (born 1938)

=== September ===
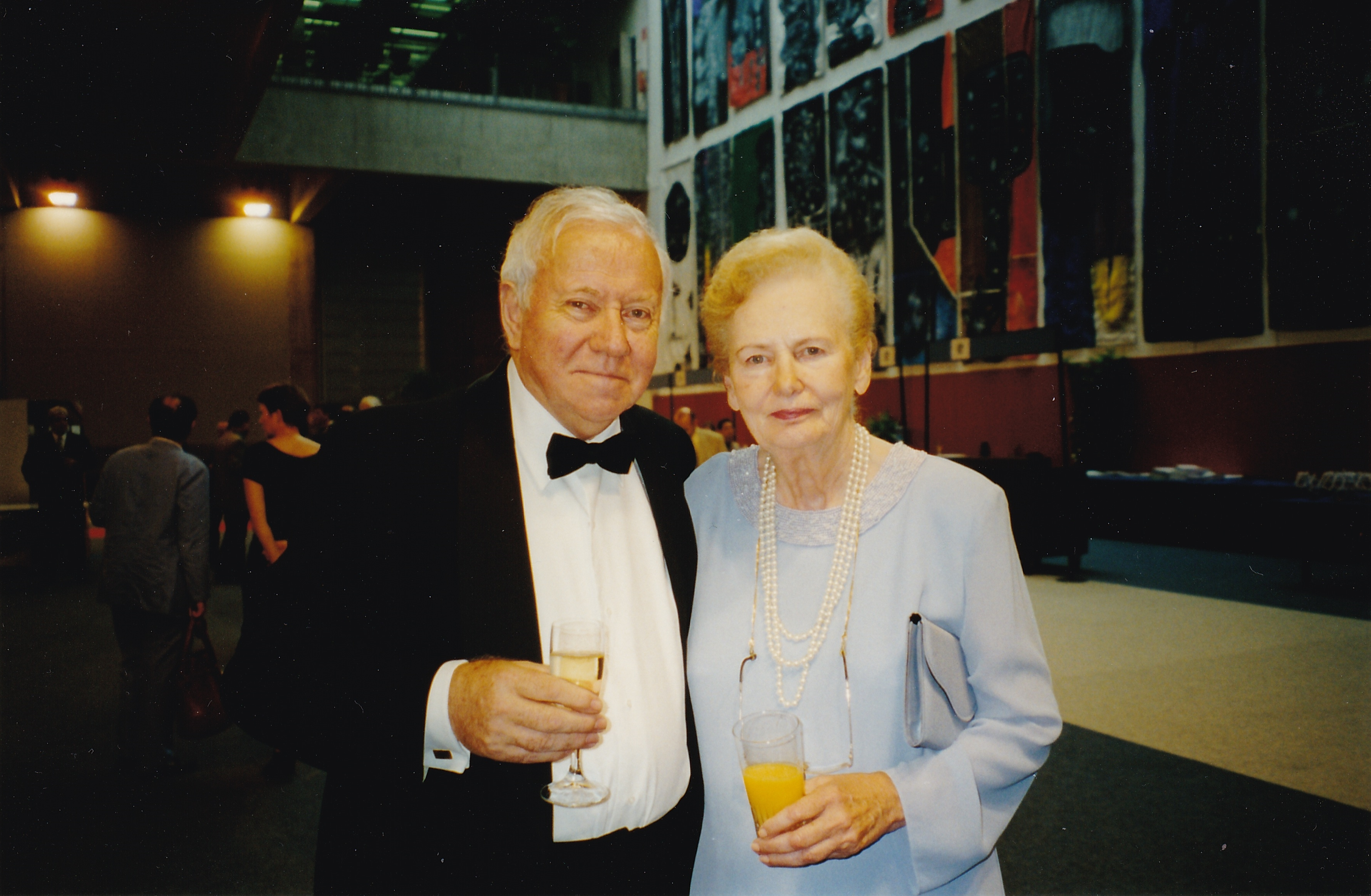
Alan Truscott with his wife Dorothy

- 3 September – R. S. R. Fitter, naturalist and author (born 1913)
- 4 September – Alan Truscott, bridge player (born 1930)
- 7 September
  - L. J. K. Setright, motoring journalist (born 1931)
  - Norman Wylie, Lord Wylie, Scottish politician (born 1923)
- 8 September
  - Noel Cantwell, former footballer and football manager (born 1932 in Ireland)
  - David Pearce, economist (born 1941)
- 10 September – Sir Hermann Bondi, mathematician and cosmologist (born 1919 in Austria)
- 12 September – Ronald Leigh-Hunt, actor (born 1920)
- 15 September – Guy Green, filmmaker and cinematographer (born 1913)
- 18 September
  - Noel Mander, organ builder (born 1912)
  - Michael Park, rally driver (accident while racing) (born 1966)
- 19 September – John Rayner, rabbi (born 1924, Germany)
- 23 September
  - Roger Brierley, actor (born 1935)
  - John Knatchbull, 7th Baron Brabourne, peer and television presenter (born 1924)
- 25 September – Lionel Kochan, historian (born 1922)
- 26 September – Helen Cresswell, children's author (born 1934)
- 27 September – Ronald Pearsall, author (born 1927)
- 29 September
  - Patrick Caulfield, painter and printmaker (born 1936)
  - Bruce Stewart, television scriptwriter (born 1925 in New Zealand)

=== October ===
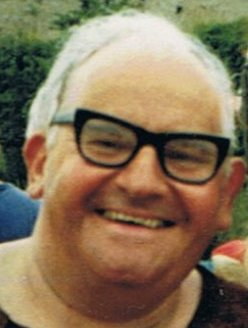
Ronnie Barker

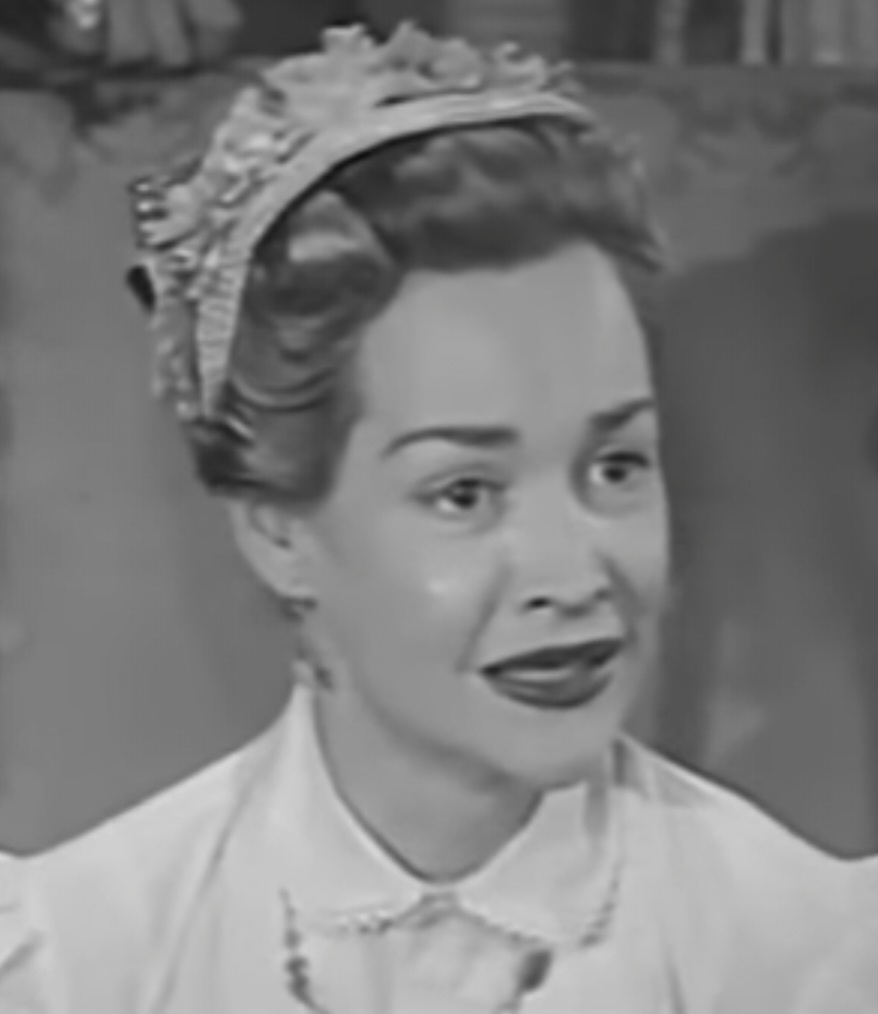
Ursula Howells

- 1 October
  - David Frederick Case, audiobook narrator (born 1932)
  - Peter Hubbard-Miles, politician (born 1927)
- 3 October – Ronnie Barker, actor and comedian (The Two Ronnies, Porridge, Open All Hours) (born 1929)
- 4 October – Mike Gibbins, drummer (Badfinger) (born 1949)
- 7 October
  - Roger A. Freeman, military aviation historian (born 1928)
  - Michael Ward (mountaineer), mountaineer and surgeon (born 1925)
- 8 October
  - Alfred Goldie, mathematician (born 1920)
  - Janet Elizabeth Macgregor, physician and cytologist (born 1920)
  - Harry Pitt, mathematician (born 1914)
- 11 October
  - Jan Holden, actress (born 1931)
  - Arthur Seldon, economist (born 1916)
- 14 October – Ian Breakwell, artist (born 1943)
- 16 October – Ursula Howells, actress (born 1922)
- 18 October
  - Johnny Haynes, former footballer (born 1934)
  - John Hollis, actor (born 1927)
- 20 October – Michael Gill, television producer (born 1923)
- 24 October – Robert Sloman, actor and screenwriter (born 1926)
- 25 October – Barbara Keogh, actress (born 1929)
- 26 October – Sir Richard Southwood, biologist (born 1931)
- 28 October – Peter Beet, doctor and railway preservationist (born 1937)
- 30 October – Horace Trevor-Cox, farmer and politician (born 1908)
- 31 October
  - William C. Marshall, racehorse trainer (born 1918)
  - Mary Wimbush, actress (born 1924)

=== November ===
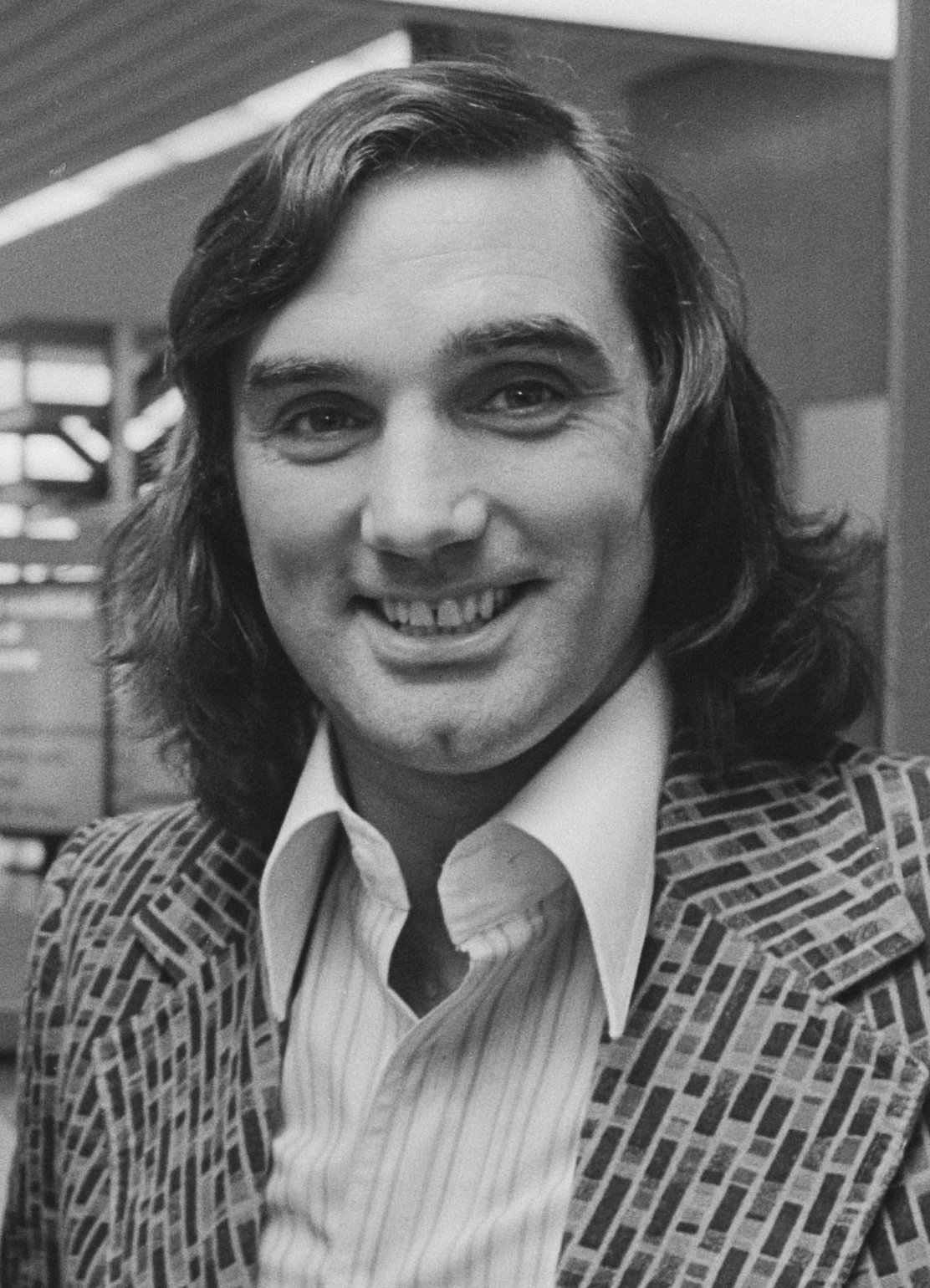
George Best

- 1 November – Mary Bennett, academic (born 1913)
- 2 November – Alfred Shaughnessy, television scriptwriter (born 1916)
- 3 November – Geoffrey Keen, film actor (born 1916)
- 5 November
  - Peter Brunt, ancient historian (born 1917)
  - John Fowles, author (born 1926)
- 6 November – Robert Alexander, Baron Alexander of Weedon, barrister, banker and politician (born 1936)
- 7 November
  - Harry Thompson, producer and writer of TV comedies (born 1960)
  - Donald Watson, wildlife artist (born 1918)
  - Steve Whatley, actor and television presenter (suicide) (born 1959)
- 8 November – Francis Cheetham, authority on alabaster (born 1928)
- 9 November – Avril Angers, actress (born 1918)
- 10 November – Ted Wragg, professor of education (born 1938)
- 11 November – Patrick Anson, 5th Earl of Lichfield, peer (born 1939)
- 16 November – Donald Watson, founder of the Vegan Society (born 1910)
- 19 November – John Timpson, journalist and radio presenter (born 1928)
- 21 November
  - Alfred Anderson, World War I veteran and last survivor of the 1914 Christmas truce (born 1896)
  - Aileen Fox, archaeologist (born 1907)
- 22 November – Bruce Hobbs, jockey and racehorse trainer (born 1920)
- 23 November – Constance Cummings, actress (born 1910 in the United States)
- 25 November
  - George Best, former footballer (born 1946)
  - Richard Burns, rally driver (born 1971)
- 26 November – David Tabor, physicist (born 1913)
- 28 November – Tony Meehan, drummer (The Shadows) (born 1943)
- 30 November – Kenneth Macksey, historian and writer (born 1923)

=== December ===
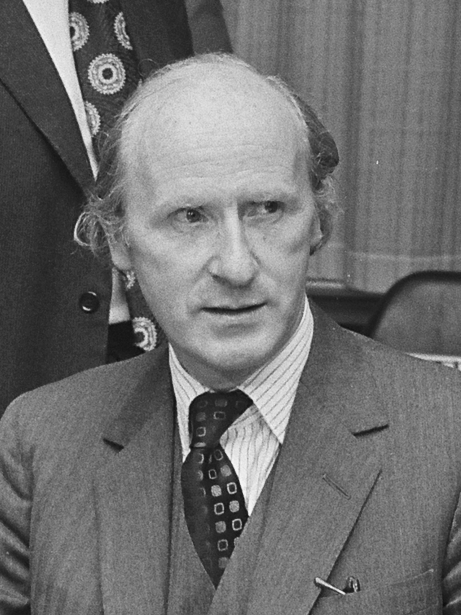
Anthony Barber

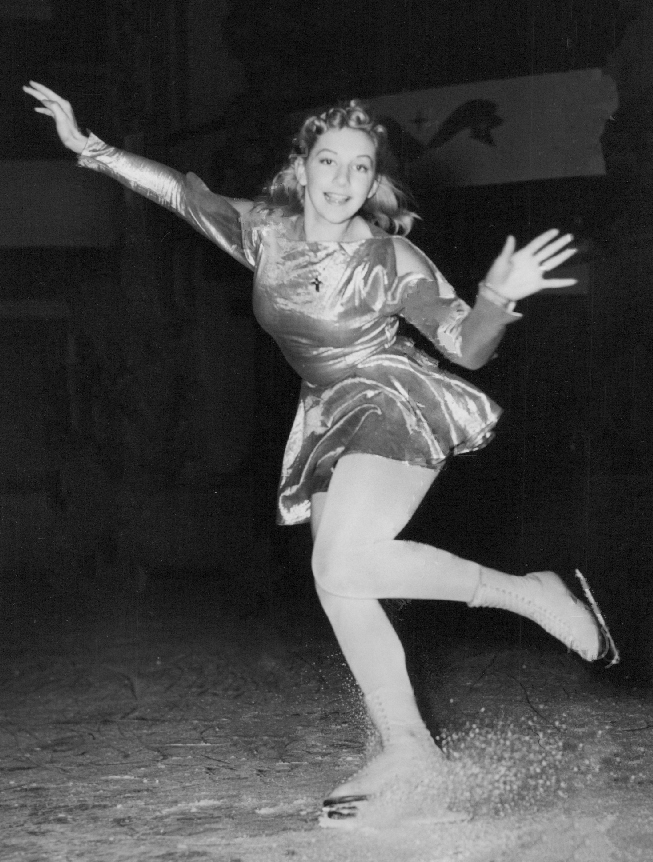
Belita Jepson-Turner

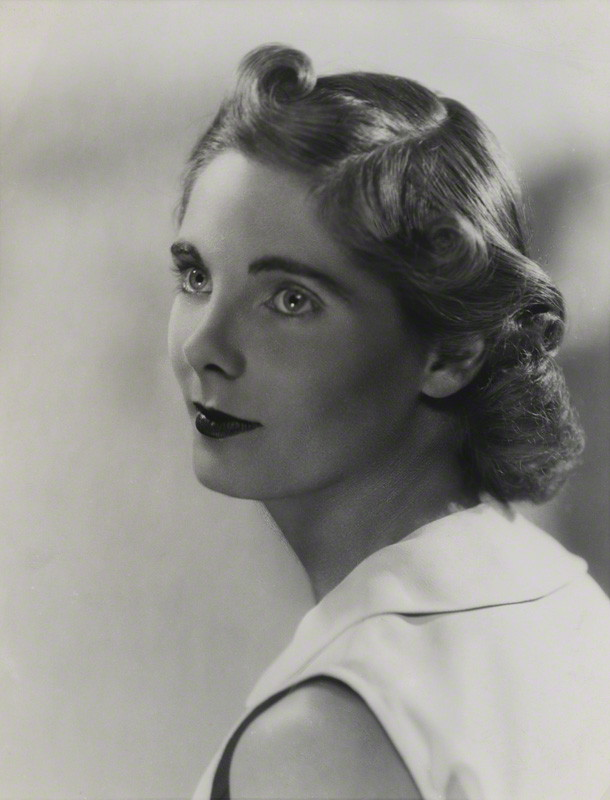
Kay Stammers

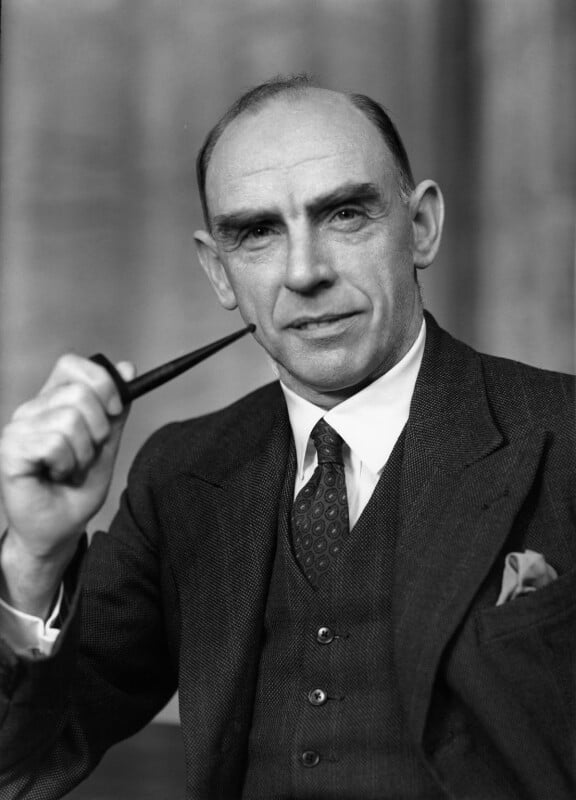
Harold Lawton

- 1 December
  - Mary Hayley Bell, actress (born 1911)
  - Ray Hanna, fighter pilot (born 1928 in New Zealand)
- 2 December
  - Lillian Browse, art dealer (born 1906)
  - Leonard Lewis, television producer and director (born 1927)
- 3 December – John Ganzoni, 2nd Baron Belstead, peer and politician (born 1932)
- 4 December – Ted Allbeury, author of espionage fiction (born 1917)
- 5 December – Claude Ambrose Rogers, mathematician (born 1920)
- 6 December – Richard Grimsdale, electrical engineer, builder of the first transistorised computer (born 1929)
- 7 December – Adrian Biddle, cinematographer (born 1952)
- 8 December – Dame Rose Heilbron, judge (born 1914)
- 11 December
  - Richard Sandbrook, environmentalist (born 1946)
  - Max Walters, botanist and academic (born 1920)
- 12 December – David Pritchard, chess player (born 1919)
- 13 December – Sir Roland Guy, Army general (born 1928)
- 14 December
  - Gordon Duncan, bagpiper (born 1964)
  - Tom Milne, film critic (born 1926)
  - Rodney William Whitaker, author (born 1931 in the United States)
- 15 December
  - Maurice Beresford, historian (born 1920)
  - John McIntyre, theologian (born 1916)
- 16 December
  - Anthony Barber, former Chancellor of the Exchequer (born 1920)
  - Kenneth Bulmer, author (born 1921)
- 17 December – Trevor Duncan, composer (born 1924)
- 18 December
  - Iris Bower, Second World War RAF nurse
  - Belita Jepson-Turner, Olympic skater and film actress (born 1923)
  - Keith Duckworth, automotive engineer (born 1933)
  - Doris Fisher, Baroness Fisher of Rednal, politician (born 1919)
- 19 December – Charles Brett, architectural historian (born 1928)
- 21 December – Hallam Tennyson, radio producer (murdered) (born 1920)
- 22 December – George Speaight, art historian (born 1914)
- 23 December – Kay Stammers, tennis player (born 1914)
- 24 December – Harold Lawton, academic and World War I veteran (born 1899)
- 25 December – John Hayes, art historian (born 1929)
- 29 December
  - Eileen Nolan, former director of the Women's Royal Army Corps (born 1920)
  - Cyril Philips, historian (born 1912)
  - Basil William Robinson, art historian (born 1912)
- 31 December
  - Maurice Dodd, cartoonist (born 1932)
  - David Trustram Eve, 2nd Baron Silsoe, peer and lawyer (born 1930)

== See also ==
- 2005 in British music
- 2005 in British television
- List of British films of 2005
- 2005 in England
