= International Federation of Chemical, Energy and General Workers' Unions =

Former global union federation (1907–1995)

- Merged into: International Federation of Chemical, Energy, Mine and General Workers' Unions
- Founded: 1907
- Dissolved: 1995
- Location: International
- Members: 6.3 million (1992)
- Affiliations: International Confederation of Free Trade Unions

The International Federation of Chemical, Energy and General Workers' Unions (ICEF) was a global union federation of trade unions.

== History ==
The secretariat was founded in August 1907, as the International Federation of General Factory Workers, but became inactive during World War I. It was re-established on 27 October 1920 at a conference in Amsterdam, and set up its headquarters at 17 Museumplein in the city. By 1935, the federation had affiliates in Belgium, Czechoslovakia, Denmark, Finland, France, Hungary, the Netherlands, Norway, Poland, Spain, Sweden, the UK, and Yugoslavia.

The federation held regular sectional conferences for the chemical industry. Following the collapse of the International Federation of Glass Workers, it added a glass industry section, with its first conference in 1938. Similarly, the International Federation of Pottery Workers dissolved before World War II, and in 1947, the federation held the first conference of its new pottery industry section. In 1954, it held a conference for the rubber industry.

In 1950, the federation was renamed as the International Federation of Industrial Organisations and General Workers' Unions (IFF), and then in 1964 it became the International Federation of Chemical and General Workers' Unions (ICF). At this time, the organisation was in competition with the International Federation of Petroleum and Chemical Workers, but that collapsed in 1976, with many of its affiliates joining the IFCGW, which renamed itself as the International Federation of Chemical, Energy and General Workers' Unions (ICEF). Membership accordingly rose from four million to 6.3 million by 1992. In 1995, the ICEF merged with the Miners' International Federation to form the International Federation of Chemical, Energy, Mine and General Workers' Unions.

== Affiliates ==
The federation rarely published a list of affiliates, but the following unions attended the federation's 1964 congress:

Union	Country
Amalgamated Engineering Union	United Kingdom
Amalgamated Society of Woodworkers	United Kingdom
Ceramic Federation	Denmark
Chemical Industry Workers' Federation	Greece
Chemical, Paper and Ceramic Union	West Germany
Chemical Workers' Union	Austria
Chemistry Federation	France
Dam, Energy, Water and Irrigation Workers' Union of Turkey	Turkey
Danish General Workers' Union	Denmark
Danish Glass Workers' Union	Denmark
Danish Women Workers' Union	Denmark
Federation of Chemistry	Italy
Finnish General Workers' Union	Finland
Finnish Glass and Porcelain Workers' Union	Finland
General Union	Belgium
Glass Bottle Blowers' Association of the United States and Canada	United States
Heating and Domestic Engineers' Union	United Kingdom
Histadrut	Israel
International Chemical Workers' Union	Canada/United States
Italian Union of Chemical and Allied Industries	Italy
Japanese Federation of Chemical and General Workers' Unions	Japan
General Union of Miscellaneous Industries	Netherlands
National Federation of Building, Wood, Paper, Cardboard and Ceramics	France
National Union of Enginemen, Firemen, Mechanics and Electrical Workers	United Kingdom
National Union of General and Municipal Workers	United Kingdom
National Union of Printing, Bookbinding and Paper Workers	United Kingdom
National Union of Sheet Metal Workers and Coppersmiths	United Kingdom
Norwegian Union of Chemical Industry Workers	Norway
Norwegian Union of Paper Industry Workers	Norway
Paper Industry Workers' Union	Finland
Swedish Factory Workers' Union	Sweden
Swedish Paper Workers' Union	Sweden
Turkish Cement and Pottery Workers' Union	Turkey
Turkish Cinema Workers' Union	Turkey
Turkish Glass and Pottery Workers' Union	Turkey
Turkish Pulp and Paper Workers' Union	Turkey
Turkish Rubber and Plastic Industry Workers' Union	Turkey
Union of Construction and Woodworkers	Austria
Union of Drugs and Chemical Industries Workers of Turkey	Turkey
Union of Shop, Distributive and Allied Workers	United Kingdom
United Glass and Ceramics Workers of North America	United States
United Papermakers and Paperworkers	United States

== Leadership ==
=== General Secretaries ===
C. Sorrensen
1920: Roel Stenhuis
1929: Klaas de Jonge
1950: L. M. van Waasdijk
1954: Menzo ter Borch
1964: Charles Levinson
1984: Michael Boggs
1994: Vic Thorpe

=== Presidents ===
1920: James O'Grady
1925: August Brey
1933: Robert Nielsen
1945: Mark Hewitson
1950: Carl F. Lindahl
1953: Jim Matthews
1964: Wilhelm Gefeller
1970: Karl Hauenschild
1983: Moss Evans
1986: Nils Kristoffersson
1989: Hermann Rappe
