= Jim Matthews (trade unionist) =

James Matthews (1903 or 1904 – 11 March 1969) was a British trade union leader, known for his anti-communism.

Born in Bristol, Matthews began working in his youth in a tinplate works. At the age of fifteen, he lost his job, and so joined the British Army as a bandboy. He was posted to the Mountain Artillery, and served for twelve years, the last nine as an artilleryman, mostly based on the Northwest Frontier of India.

On leaving the army, Matthews found work as an assistant in a mental hospital in England. While working there, he joined the National Union of General and Municipal Workers (NUGMW), and rapidly came to prominent in the union. In 1935, he began working for the union full-time as its Bristol branch secretary, and in 1942 he became a district organiser. In 1944, he became a national industrial officer, with responsibility for the engineering industry, and four years later was relocated to work in London.

Matthews was appointed as the union's representative on the Confederation of Shipbuilding and Engineering Unions (CSEU), and in 1960 served as president of the CSEU. He also became president of the International Federation of Industrial Organisations and General Workers' Unions, chaired the joint industrial council for the chemical industry, and was secretary of the National Council for Civil Air Transport.

While working with the NUGMW, Matthews became known for his opposition to communism. He claimed that much industrial action was caused by communist disruption. He was active in the Labour Party, and served on the party's National Executive Committee from 1956 until 1963, but was a vocal critic of both left-wingers such as Michael Foot, and party members he perceived as intellectuals, such as Tom Driberg. In 1961, the party criticised him for writing an article for Aims of Industry, a right-wing publication.

Matthews retired from his trade union posts in 1963, and formed a company with Eric Dawson, formerly of the Economic League, and George Shipway. The anti-communist activists described the company as fostering "team spirit in industry", and Matthews called himself a "professional peacemaker". They were hired by British Eagle and Securicor, while Matthews also served on the Inland Waterways Board.

Trade union offices
Preceded by Carl Lindahl	President of the International Federation of Industrial Organisations and General Workers' Unions; 1953–1964	Succeeded by Wilhelm Gefeller
Preceded by Frank Foulkes	President of the Confederation of Shipbuilding and Engineering Unions; 1960–1961	Succeeded by Harold Poole
