= General Dutch Union of Domestic Workers =

Dutch trade union

The General Dutch Union of Domestic Workers (Dutch: Algemene Nederlandse Bond van Huispersoneel, ANBH) was a trade union representing domestic workers in the Netherlands.

The union was founded in October 1930, and affiliated to the Dutch Confederation of Trade Unions (NVV). Membership was low, but reached 1,000 by 1940. The union's general secretary, Geertruida Van Andel, became sympathetic to the German occupation, although the union was nonetheless banned in 1942.

In 1945, the union was revived by Anke Weidema, while in 1947, it absorbed the Dutch Union of Hairdressers, renaming itself as the General Union of Private Sector Hygiene and Domestic Services. On 1 August 1954, it merged into the General Union of Miscellaneous Industries.
