= Moss Evans =

British trade union organiser (1925–2002)

Arthur Mostyn Evans (13 July 1925 – 12 January 2002) was the general secretary of the Transport and General Workers Union (TGWU), then the largest general trade union in the United Kingdom, from 1978 until 1985.

== Biography ==
Moss Evans was born in a small terraced house in the Welsh village of Cefn Coed near Merthyr Tydfil. When he was 12, his family moved to Small Heath, Birmingham, as his father had heard there was work which he was determined to find. This was towards the end of The Depression and his father, a coal miner, had been out of work for 14 years.

Evans first became involved with trade unions whilst working for the Joseph Lucas combine, where he joined the Amalgamated Engineering Union in 1940 at the age of 15. His long involvement with the Transport and General Workers Union (TGWU) started ten years later when he changed jobs, and moved to the Bakelite factory in Birmingham, where he became shop steward a year later. His rise through the organisation of the TGWU started in 1956 when he became engineering and chemical officer for the Birmingham East district.

This was followed by;

- Birmingham regional trade group secretary 1960–1966
- London Engineering National Officer 1966–1969
- National Secretary (Automotive Section) 1969–1973
- National Organiser 1973–1978
- General Secretary 1978–1985

also

- Member, Trades Union Congress General Council 1977–1985
- Councillor (Labour Party), Borough of King's Lynn and West Norfolk 1991–2001
- King's Lynn town Mayor 1996–1997

== Personal life ==
He married Laura Bigglestone in 1947; they had three sons and three daughters together. He died in Norfolk on 12 January 2002.

Trade union offices
Preceded by Jack Jones	General Secretary of the Transport and General Workers Union; 1978–1985	Succeeded by Ron Todd
Preceded by Karl Hauenschild	President of the International Federation of Chemical, Energy and General Workers' Unions; 1983–1986	Succeeded by Nils Kristoffersson
