= Roel Stenhuis =

Dutch politician

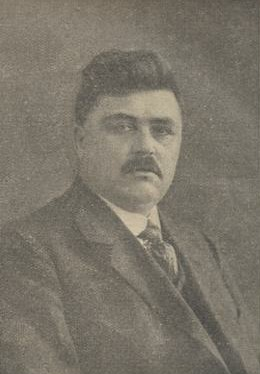
R. Stenhuis

Roelof Stenhuis (26 March 1885 – 1963) was a Dutch trade union leader and politician.

Born in Zuidbroek, he left school at the age of 15 and did a number of jobs before becoming a factory worker. He joined the youth movement of the Social Democratic Workers' Party (SDAP), and then the party itself. In 1906, Herman Gorter sent him to Limburg to try to found a miners' union there, but it was not a success. However, in Groningen, he led a successful strike of metal workers, then in 1907 became the main founder of the Dutch Union of Factory Workers, editing its newspaper De Fabrieksarbeider, and serving as general secretary until 1914, then as president.

In 1919, Stenhuis moved to become president of the Dutch Confederation of Trade Unions (NVV). Under his leadership, it committed to a socialist programme and began working closely with the SDAP. He also became president of the Workers' Youth Movement, in 1920 became secretary of the re-established International Federation of General Factory Workers, and in 1924 became president of the Institute for Workers' Education.

Stenhuis was elected to the Senate in 1923, then the House of Representatives in 1925. However, he became disenchanted with the SDAP, hoping for a more revolutionary party. In 1928, he resigned from the SDAP and all his trade union posts. He became the editor of De Vlam, pushing his political views, and held membership of various small political parties, even including the Communist Party of Holland, which he had previously opposed. Demoralised, in 1940, he joined the fascist Black Front, claiming to support its economic policy but to oppose its anti-semitism.

Due to his fascism, Stenhuis did not play a prominent role after World War II, but the Dutch Union of Factory Workers readmitted him in 1950, and in 1957 he was permitted to speak at the union's fiftieth anniversary. He died in 1963.

Trade union offices
Preceded by New position	President of the Dutch Union of Factory Workers; 1914–1921	Succeeded by Klaas de Jonge
Preceded by Jan Oudegeest	President of the Dutch Confederation of Trade Unions; 1919–1928	Succeeded by Evert Kupers
Preceded by C. Sorrensen	General Secretary of the International Federation of Factory Workers; 1920–1928	Succeeded by Klaas de Jonge
