= Wilhelm Gefeller =

German politician

Member of the Bundestag
- In office 6 October 1953 – 6 October 1957

Personal details
- Born: 27 May 1906 Essen
- Died: 25 March 1983 (aged 76)
- Party: SPD

Wilhelm Gefeller (27 May 1906 – 25 March 1983) was a German politician of the Social Democratic Party (SPD) and member of the German Bundestag.

== Life ==
Gefeller had been a member of the SPD since 1945 and was a member of the German Bundestag from 1953 to 1957.

== Literature ==
Herbst, Ludolf; Jahn, Bruno (2002). Vierhaus, Rudolf (ed.). Biographisches Handbuch der Mitglieder des Deutschen Bundestages. 1949–2002 [Biographical Handbook of the Members of the German Bundestag. 1949–2002] (in German). München: De Gruyter - De Gruyter Saur. p. 1715. ISBN 978-3-11-184511-1.

Trade union offices
Preceded by Otto Adler	President of the Chemical, Paper and Ceramic Union; 1949–1969	Succeeded by Karl Hauenschild
Preceded by Jim Matthews	President of the International Federation of Industrial Organisations and General Workers' Unions; 1964–1969	Succeeded by Karl Hauenschild
