= Menzo ter Borch =

Dutch trade unionist

Menzo ter Borch (1896–1981) was a Dutch trade unionist.

Born in Borger, ter Borch became a glassblower in 1908, working in Nieuw-Buinen, then Schiedam, and then in Nieuw-Buinen. His parents died in the Spanish flu epidemic of 1918, and he then became responsible for bringing up some of his younger siblings.

Ter Borch joined the Glass and Pottery union, and from 1921 was an unpaid member of its executive. In 1926, it merged into the Dutch Union of Factory Workers (NVvFA). He also joined the Social Democratic Workers' Party, becoming in 1923 one of its first members to win election to the Stadskanaal local council.

In 1931, ter Borch began working for the union full-time, moving to Groningen, and was also appointed to its executive. He was soon elected to the council in Groningen. At the start of World War II, he tried to leave the country, but was prevented from doing so. In 1940, he was appointed to the Groningen Provincial Council, as a replacement for F. J. Schaper, who was trying to maintain a low profile in the hope of avoiding persecution. In 1941, both councils were disbanded by the occupying Nazis, and the union was taken over by them, leading ter Borch to resign from it.

In 1941, ter Borch was arrested and placed in concentration camps until 1943, when he was unexpectedly released. He returned to working as a glassblower, to support his family, until the end of the war. The councils were then reconstituted, ter Borch again taking his seat, and he also became prominent in reconstructing the trade union movement.

Ter Borch became the chief administrator of the NVvFA in 1946, and then in 1950 became president of the renamed General Union of Miscellaneous Industries (ABC), moving to Amsterdam. In 1954, he additionally became general secretary of the International Federation of Industrial Organisations and General Workers' Unions (IFF). He retired from the leadership of the ABC in 1961, and the IFF in 1964, but remained active in the trade union movement in retirement.

Trade union offices
Preceded by Klaas de Jonge	President of the Dutch Union of Factory Workers; 1950–1961	Succeeded by Willem Liefaard
Preceded by L. M. van Waasdijk	General Secretary of the International Federation of Factory Workers; 1954–1964	Succeeded by Charles Levinson
