= Bill Morris, Baron Morris of Handsworth =

British trade union leader

The Right Honourable The Lord Morris of Handsworth OJ DL
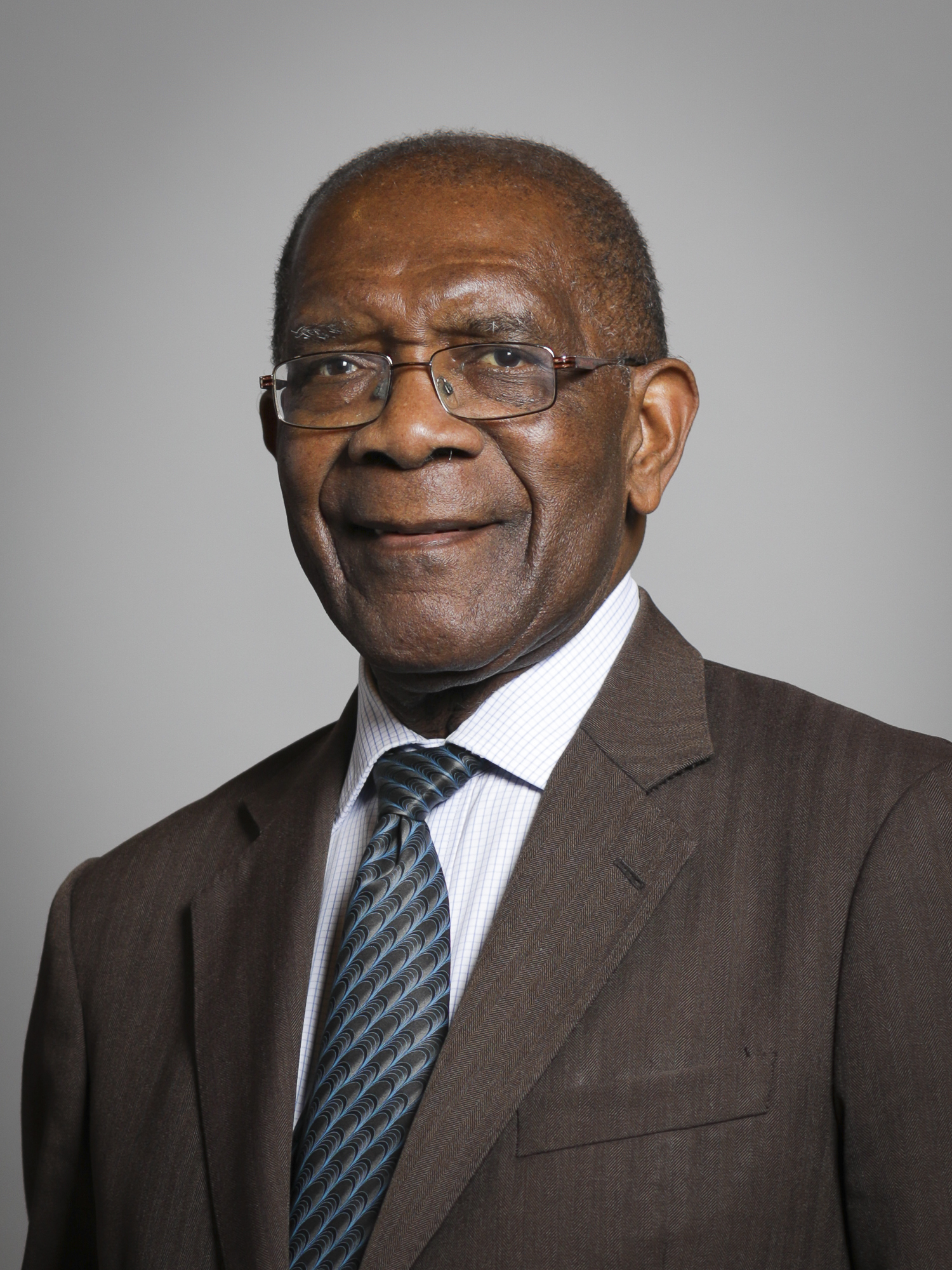

Member of the House of Lords
- Lord Temporal
- Life peerage 7 June 2006 – 21 July 2020

General Secretary of the Transport and General Workers' Union
- In office 1992–2003

Deputy General Secretary of the Transport and General Workers' Union
- In office 1986–1992

Personal details
- Born: William Manuel Morris; 19 October 1938 (age 87) Manchester Parish, Jamaica
- Occupation: legislator, appointee to various quangos
- Known for: first black leader of a British trade union

William Manuel Morris, Baron Morris of Handsworth (born 19 October 1938) is a former British trade union leader. He was General Secretary of the Transport and General Workers' Union from 1992 to 2003, and the first black leader of a major British trade union.

Morris sat in the House of Lords, under the Labour Party whip, from 2006 to 2020.

== Early life ==
Bill Morris was born in Manchester Parish, Jamaica. After the death of his father, William, a part-time policeman, his mother, Una, emigrated to England to find work settling in Handsworth, Birmingham. Morris joined her in the UK in 1954, finding work at a local car parts manufacturer, Hardy Spicer Engineering Ltd.

Morris married Minetta in 1957. His wife died in 1990. They have two sons.

== Trade union career ==
Morris joined the Transport and General Workers' Union in 1958, and became a shop steward in 1962. After serving on the TGWU General Executive Council (GEC) from 1972 to 1973, Bill Morris joined the union as a full-time official. He served as district officer of the Nottingham District from 1973 to 1976 and district secretary of the Northampton District from 1976 to 1979. In 1979, he became national secretary of the Passenger Services Trade Group, which was responsible for staff working for bus and coach companies. He was elected deputy general secretary on the 18 September 1985, working under general secretary Ron Todd.

Morris was elected general secretary when Ron Todd retired in 1992. He was re-elected in 1995, ahead of Jack Dromey. He remained in the post until his retirement on his 65th birthday, 19 October 2003, when he was succeeded as general secretary by Tony Woodley.

Morris was a member of the TUC General Council and executive committee from 1988 to 2003. He was appointed a non-executive director of the Bank of England in 1998. He was also a member of the Royal Commission on the Reform of the House of Lords from 1999 to 2000. He is a member of the Board of Governors of London South Bank University, a Trustee of the Open University Foundation, and the member of the Courts of the University of Northampton and the University of Bedfordshire. He was appointed as the first Chancellor of the University of Technology, Jamaica in 1999 and as Chancellor of Staffordshire University in 2004. He has been a member of the advisory councils of the BBC and IBA and a Commissioner of the Commission for Racial Equality. He chaired the Morris Inquiry into professional standards in the Metropolitan Police in 2004. He sits as a member of the Employment Appeal Tribunal. He is also a patron of the Refugee Council. In 1995 he refused to give union backing to 500 Liverpool dock workers who were sacked, claiming that it was an unofficial strike even though the union had failed to act on concerns relayed to the union in the lead up to the dispute, in effect leaving the dock workers to fight the cause themselves.

Morris is an independent non-executive Director of the England and Wales Cricket Board.

== House of Lords ==
Morris was awarded the Order of Jamaica in 2002 and received a knighthood in the 2003 Queen's Birthday Honours. On 11 April 2006, it was announced that Morris would take a seat in the House of Lords as a working life peer, and he was gazetted as Baron Morris of Handsworth, of Handsworth in the County of West Midlands in June 2006. He served on the Parliamentary Joint Committee on Human Rights.

In August 2014, Morris was one of 200 public figures who were signatories to a letter to The Guardian opposing Scottish independence in the run-up to September's referendum on that issue.

He retired from the House of Lords on 21 July 2020.

Trade union offices
Preceded by Alec Kitson	Deputy General Secretary of the Transport and General Workers' Union; 1986–1992	Succeeded by Jack Adams
Preceded by Ron Todd	General Secretary of the Transport and General Workers' Union; 1992–2003	Succeeded by Tony Woodley
Preceded by Rita Donaghy	President of the Trades Union Congress; 2001	Succeeded by Tony Young
Orders of precedence in the United Kingdom
Preceded by The Lord Morrow	Gentlemen; Baron Morris of Handsworth	Followed by The Lord Marland
