= Klaas de Jonge =

Dutch trade union leader

Klaas de Jonge (29 June 1887 – 19 April 1958) was a Dutch trade union leader.

Born in Hoogezand, de Jonge trained as a printer, then later worked in a factory. He joined the Dutch Union of Factory Workers (NVvFA), and also the Social Democratic Workers' Party (SDAP). In 1913, he was the first social democrat to win election to the local council, and in 1914, he became district secretary of the SDAP. That year, he began working full-time for the NVvFA, while in 1915, he won election to the council in Winschoten.

In 1917, he was elected as the secretary of the NVvFA, during a period of rapid growth for the union, then in 1921 he became its president. He was elected to the executive of the International Federation of Factory Workers in 1923, and became its general secretary in 1929. In 1928, he became vice-president of the Omroepvereniging VARA broadcasting organisation.

During World War II, de Jonge was arrested twice, being imprisoned on the first occasion, and sent to a concentration camp in Germany on the second. He was liberated at the end of the war, but spent several months recuperating in hospital before he was able to return to Amsterdam. He then returned to his trade union posts, retiring from the NVvFA in 1949, and the international in 1950.

In retirement, de Jonge suffered from poor health, and he died in 1958.

Trade union offices
Preceded by Roel Stenhuis	President of the Dutch Union of Factory Workers; 1921–1949	Succeeded by Menzo ter Borch
Preceded by Roel Stenhuis	General Secretary of the International Federation of Factory Workers; 1929–1950	Succeeded by L. M. van Waasdijk
