= Karl Hauenschild =

German trade union leader and politician

Karl Hauenschild (30 August 1920 – 28 February 2006) was a German trade union leader and politician.

Born in Hanover, Hauenschild left school early due to economic hardship. He refused to join the Hitler Youth, and so was barred from his planned career in financial administration, instead becoming a clerk at a chemical company. In 1940, he was conscripted into the Wehrmacht and fought on the Eastern Front. He was wounded, and then later captured by American troops, becoming a prisoner of war.

In May 1945, Hauenschild was released and returned to his job at the chemical company. He also joined the Social Democratic Party and a local forerunner of the Chemical, Paper and Ceramic Union (IG Chemie). From 1947, he worked full-time as a union organiser in Hanover, which also happened to be the headquarters to the co-ordination of the various zonal unions in the chemical industry. As a result, his skills were noticed, and he was given a leading role in organisation education within the union. Later, he was elected to the union's executive committee, with responsibility for organisation and administration.

In 1969, Hauenschild was elected as president of IG Chemie, in which role he took the union to the right wing of the union movement. A strong supporter of social partnership, he was criticised for conducting secretive negotiations with employers, and leading a top-down style of organisation. In 1970, he was additionally elected as president of the International Federation of Chemical, Energy and General Workers' Unions.

From 1979 to 1980, Hauenschild served as a member of the European Parliament. He retired from his union positions in 1982.

Trade union offices
Preceded by Wilhelm Gefeller	President of the Chemical, Paper and Ceramic Union; 1969–1982	Succeeded by Hermann Rappe
Preceded by Wilhelm Gefeller	President of the International Federation of Chemical, Energy and General Workers' Unions; 1970–1983	Succeeded by Moss Evans
