= International Federation of Chemical, Energy, Mine and General Workers' Unions =

1995–2012 trade union centre

- Abbreviation: ICEM
- Merged into: IndustriALL Global Union
- Formation: 1995
- Dissolved: 2012
- Merger of: International Federation of Chemical, Energy and General Workers' Unions; Miners' International Federation
- Type: Trade union centre
- Headquarters: Brussels, Belgium; Geneva, Switzerland
- Members: 20 million
- Presidents: Hans Berger; John Maitland; Senzeni Zokwana
- General secretaries: Vic Thorpe; Fred Higgs; Manfred Warda
- Affiliations: Council of Global Unions
- Website: www.icem.org

The International Federation of Chemical, Energy, Mine and General Workers' Unions (ICEM) was a global union federation of trade unions. In November 2007, ICEM represented 467 industrial trade unions in 132 countries, claiming a membership of over 20 million workers.

== History ==
The federation was founded in 1995 in Washington, DC, when the Miners' International Federation merged with the International Federation of Chemical and General Workers' Unions. In 2000, the small Universal Alliance of Diamond Workers merged into the federation, while in 2007, the World Federation of Industry Workers joined. In June 2012, affiliates of ICEM merged into the new global federation IndustriALL Global Union.

The organization represented workers employed in a wide range of industries, including energy, mining, chemicals, bioscience, pulp and paper, rubber, gems and jewellery, glass, ceramics, cement, and environmental services.

== Organization and activities ==
The headquarters of ICEM was variously based in Brussels, Belgium, and Geneva, Switzerland, where meetings of the Presidium and the executive committee were held. These governing bodies organized activities on a higher level while the regional offices organized regional conferences, workshops and solidarity actions. The Presidium oversaw the grand line of ICEM whilst the executive committee was more involved in the day-to-day routine of the organization. Every four years, starting in 1995, a worldwide congress was organized in which new committee members were elected and policies were changed. The congresses were held in the following order:

- Washington, DC, in 1995
- Durban, South Africa, in November 1999
- Stavanger, Norway, in August 2003
- Bangkok, Thailand, in November 2007.

The regional offices dealt with specific geographical areas such as Africa, Asia-Pacific, Europe, Latin America and the Caribbean and North America. The regional office of the Asia Pacific area was housed in Seoul, South Korea. This regional office was one of the most active offices of ICEM.

ICEM supported many strikes in various regions including the strike of 7 October 1998 in Russia by communists and the Federation of Independent Trade Unions of Russia during the 1998 Russian financial crisis. Affiliates of ICEM have also organized protests in South Africa. ICEM worked together with human rights and environmental activists who were in conflict with multinationals such as Rio Tinto by raising awareness and funding research.

ICEM published two quarterly bulletins called ICEM Info and ICEM Global which merged in 2002 to become ICEM Global Info.

== Research ==
Richard Croucher and Elizabeth Cotton's book Global Unions, Global Business contains a case study of the ICEM's dealings with the Anglo American mining company, in chapter eight.

The archive of ICEM is housed in the International Institute of Social History in Amsterdam and is open to the public.

== Leadership ==
=== General secretaries ===
- 1995: Vic Thorpe
- 1999: Fred Higgs
- 2007: Manfred Warda

=== Presidents ===
- 1995: Hans Berger, Germany
- 1999/2003: John Maitland, Australia
- 2005: Senzeni Zokwana, South Africa
