= General Dutch Industrial Union of the Mining Industry =

Dutch trade union

The General Dutch Industrial Union of the Mining Industry (Dutch: Algemene Nederlandse Bedrijfsbond voor de Mijnindustrie, ANBM) was a trade union representing mineworkers in the Netherlands.

The union was founded on 22 August 1909, in Heerlen, as the General Dutch Miners' Union (ANMB). It affiliated to the recently founded Dutch Confederation of Trade Unions (NVV), a social democratic organisation. While a Catholic union, the General Union of Christian Miners, already existed, many miners had become disillusioned with it, due to its role in a recent strike. By the end of the decade, the union had 700 members, more than half the number of the Catholic union.

Despite strong opposition from Catholic clergy, the union grew, its membership peaking at 5,000 in 1933. During World War II, the leadership of the union continued operations, even under Nazi control. It ceased operating only around 1944, then was revived after the war with an entirely new leadership.

After the war, the ANMB formed a loose confederation with the Dutch Catholic Miners' Union and the Dutch Protestant Miners' Union, the Industrial Union for the Mining Industry. It was also active in the Miners' International Federation. In 1951, the NVV reorganised its affiliates as industrial unions; the union started representing clerical workers in the mining industry, and accordingly renamed itself as the ANBM. Around the same time, the Catholic Church banned its believers from joining the union, and in response, the ANMBI dissolved the Industrial Union.

The workforce in the mines declined in the 1950s, particularly in the areas outside Limburg which were strongholds of the ANBM. By 1964, membership was down to 2,002, and in 1965, it was announced that all the mines would close within ten years. This motivated the union to merge into the General Union of Miscellaneous Industries (ABC) at the start of 1970. The ABC and its successor retained a mining section until the closure of the last mine, at the end of 1974.

== Presidents ==
1909: J. H. Elfers
1919: Christiaan van de Bilt
1945: ?
1950s: A. Coumans
