= Brian Cookman =

English musician & composer (1946–2005)

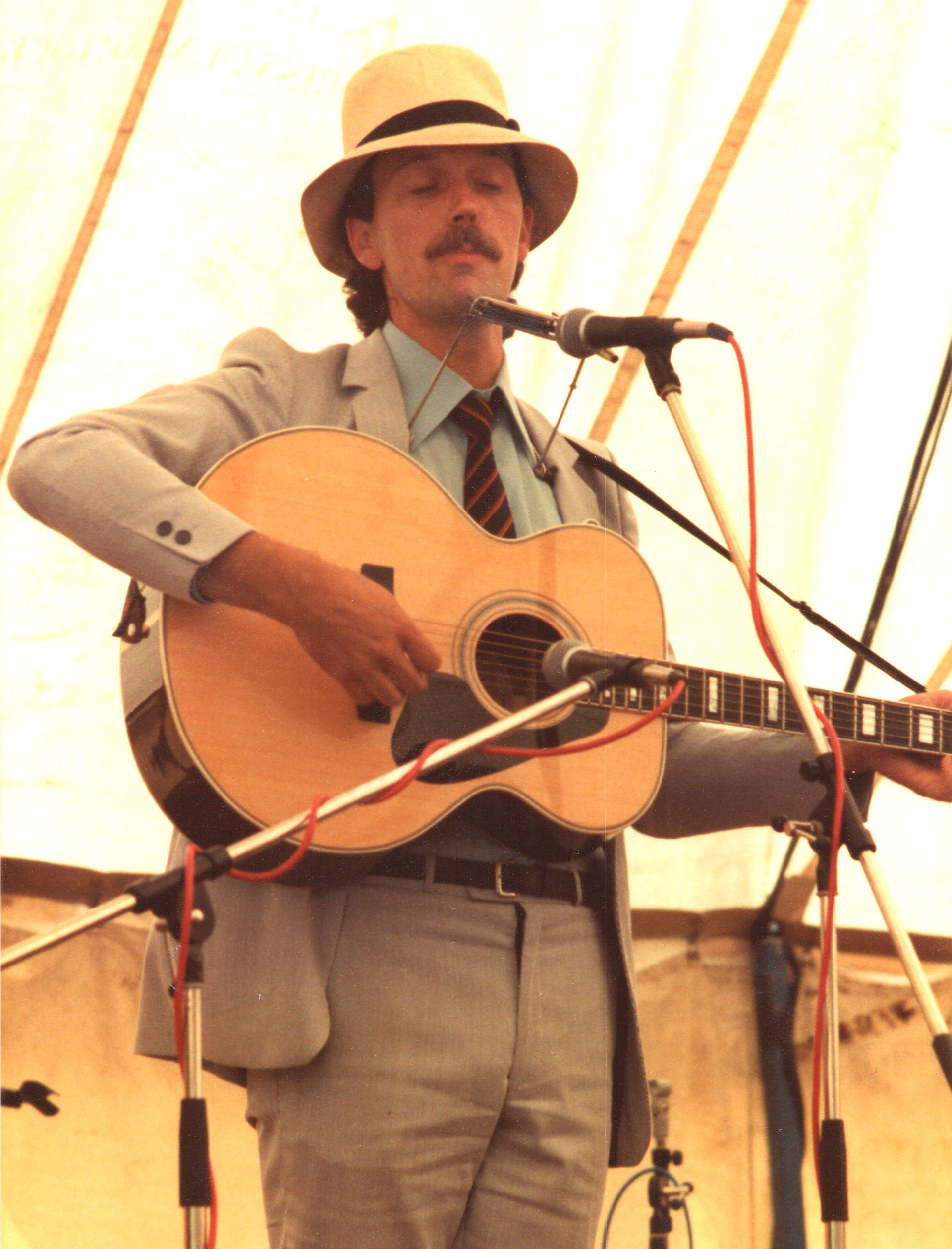
Cookman on stage at the 1982 Trowbridge Village Pump Festival

Brian Cookman (22 November 1946 – 18 February 2005) was an English musician and composer, magazine designer and artist, and tai chi practitioner. He earned a reputation as one of Britain's finest exponents of Delta blues and jug band music. He carried on a career as a magazine designer in tandem with his musical life. As one of the country's leading magazine designers, he was a pioneer of desktop publishing and also helped to launch Rolling Stone in the UK.

== Biography ==
Born Brian Christopher Cookman in India, Cookman and his parents lived there until he was seven. The family moved back to Harrow, Middlesex in 1954.

By the age of 14 he was singing and playing guitar singing, as he put it "to appalled American servicemen in a pizza restaurant in rural England for comparatively vast sums of money". While still at school Cookman showed his individuality by taking a rolled-up umbrella with him every morning.

After studying graphic design at Harrow School of Art, he went to work for the record company EMI, where he became promotions manager. He played gigs at folk clubs in the evenings. Copying Jesse Fuller, he established his harp-on-a-rack and authentic driving guitar style which was his trade mark. Joining forces with friends John Reed and Tony Knight, he formed Jug Trust (as in The National Trust) in 1962, a trio renowned for their humour, and their interpretation of rarely heard jug band music from outfits like the Memphis Jug Band, Clifford Hayes Jug Band, King David's Jug Band and Gus Cannon's Jug Stompers.

On 14 October 1972, Cookman married Lesley Penn, now the author of the Libby Sarjeant mystery series published by Headline, with whom he went on to have four children, Louise, now a professional singer; Miles, a singer-songwriter, rhythm guitarist and stand-in Jug Trust member; Phillipa, also a singer and occasional guitarist and Leo, the only pianist in the family.

After many years of playing all around UK and Europe, Cookman's songwriting began to demand a more commercial sound, so the band became Bronx Cheer and added keyboards, bass and drums. Sharing the same management as Chicken Shack, Mungo Jerry and Savoy Brown, more years on the road followed, with one album, Bronx Cheer's Greatest Hits, Volume Three, a single and an EP.

A single, "Hold on to Me", reached the charts in Eastern Europe but because of the Iron Curtain, Cookman was never able to get his royalties out of the country.

The band evolved again into The Brian Cookman Band (BCB) – including the former Chicken Shack guitarist Rob Hull – which toured with groups including Gallagher and Lyle. However, bands were becoming too expensive to maintain, so he began all over again, this time as a solo artist. Cookman kept playing until a few months before his death in 2005. He played with pianist, Lee Wilson under the name Delta Flashback. In the latter years of his life, Wilson was replaced by, Brian's son, Leo Cookman.

Cookman's set was a blend of blues from the 1920s and 1930s and, occasionally, his own material, using 6- and 12-string acoustic guitars, tiple, harmonicas and kazoo, and humour. In 2003, he was a founder member of Brook's Blues Bar and became responsible for signing many of the acts who performed at this West London venue.

Appearing many times on national TV and radio both in the UK and Europe, he played at music festivals as a performer and compere. He also had three solo albums to his credit. His songs – such as "The Hiring", "Iron Horse", "White Trash", "Helping Themselves" and "Hard Times" – have been recorded by other performers.

As well as his musical career, Cookman was one of the UK's foremost magazine designers. His music connections and design skills helped him get a job as advertisement director on Rolling Stone magazine when it was launched in the UK in 1970.

For a time Cookman was group art director for Emap, but he left to run his own design business, producing work for a large range of publications, including the Financial Times.

He continued to work in graphic design, and wrote two books: Desktop Design: Getting the Professional Look (1990) and Essential Design (1997), both of which he updated three times.

He also taught desktop publishing skills and re-designed dozens of magazines, from What Car? to the British Dental Journal.

Cookman was the only NHS-registered tai chi practitioner, with schools in Kent and Cambridgeshire, and was chairman of the Tai Chi and Chi Kung Forum for Health. He started learning it in 1981, and travelled to South Africa to teach its relaxation techniques to murderers and other violent criminals. "It was pretty scary," he said. "At first, they wouldn't talk but by the end, they were working together and shaking hands with each other."

Cookman also revived the old fertility dance of Plough Monday and the Molly Men in the 1970s. This ritual dated back hundreds of years, and was intended to ensure that crops in the Fenland would grow well. It was traditionally performed by ploughboys; the black-faced dancers, carrying brooms and wearing tattered coats bestrewn with ribbons, would dance at farms and in every village. The tradition had died out in the 1930s, but Cookman found two old Molly Men, learned the dances from them in 1977, and every year, on Plough Monday, he performed the dances in Cambridgeshire villages. His sons now carry on the tradition.

Cookman died of cancer on 18 February 2005. He was buried in a biodegradable casket and his funeral was followed by a wake in a brewery. Since his death, thanks to Sheila and John Reed, a compilation album of Bronx Cheer recordings has been released.

In 2011 Riverman-Bella Terra Music issued two of Brian's albums on 24-bit digitally remastered CDs, Grinnin' and Jack's Return Home.

== Discography ==
=== Albums ===
- I Got Them Jug Band Blues (Brian Cookman)
- Bronx Cheer's Greatest Hits Vol 3 (Bronx Cheer)
- Live at Assembly House (Brian Cookman & Rob Mason)
- The Brian Cookman Band [EP] (Brian Cookman Band)
- Delta Flashback (Brian Cookman & Lee Wilson)
- Grinnin' (Brian Cookman)
- Jack's Return Home (Brian Cookman)
