= Operation Garron =

United Kingdom relief operation after the 2004 Indian Ocean earthquake and tsunami

Operation Garron is the codename that the United Kingdom assigned to its military relief operation in the aftermath of the devastating tsunami caused by the 2004 Indian Ocean earthquake.

== Initial response ==
The first forces assigned were Royal Navy and Royal Air Force. An RAF C-17 Globemaster III transport aircraft was assigned to the region along with the RN warship HMS Chatham, which left its station patrolling in the Persian Gulf. The Royal Fleet Auxiliary vessel RFA Diligence, present in Kochi, India when the disaster struck, replenished Chatham before returning to Kochi to embark aid supplies. Royal Navy engineers were also airlifted to the area to augment the Diligence.

After the port call it returned to the disaster area, to perform relief work with Chatham around the east coast of Sri Lanka. The embarked helicopters on board the ships, including two Westland Lynx machines on board Chatham, are also participating in the relief effort. Further RAF Globemaster, Tristar and Hercules aircraft have flown in supplies. RAF personnel are operating in the city of Banda Aceh, Indonesia in assistance of RAF and international relief flights there.

== Troop offer ==
A company of a British Army Gurkha battalion stationed in Brunei and two accompanying Army Air Corps helicopters was offered to the Indonesian government in January 2005 to aid in efforts on the island of Sumatra. However, Indonesia declined the Gurkha troops, and accepted only the helicopters. It is believed the Gurkhas were turned down due to Indonesia's past confrontation with such British-led troops
