= Chemical, Paper and Ceramic Union =

The Chemical, Paper and Ceramic Union (German: IG Chemie-Papier-Keramik) was a trade union representing chemical, oil refinery, paper, rubber, ceramics, glass and plastics workers in West Germany.

While the Factory Workers' Union of Germany, dissolved by the Nazis in 1933, was seen as the forerunner of the union, IG Chemie was established on 14 October 1948.

The third largest affiliate of the German Trade Union Confederation for much of its history, the union initially struggled with Allied attempts to limit the chemicals industry in West Germany. However, from 1958 it began seeing wage increases for its members above the rate of inflation, and also saw major successes in health and safety. During the 1960s, it was seen as a radical, left-wing union, but by the 1970s, it was associated with the right wing of the union movement, and criticised for its top-down approach.

In 1991, the East German Industrial Union of Chemicals, Glass and Ceramics merged into the union. By 1996, it had 694,897 members. The following year, it merged with the Union of Mining and Energy and the Leather Union, to form IG Bergbau, Chemie, Energie.

== Presidents ==
1946: Otto Adler
1949: Wilhelm Gefeller
1969: Karl Hauenschild
1982: Hermann Rappe
1995: Hubertus Schmoldt
