= General Union of Miscellaneous Industries =

General Union of Miscellaneous Industries (Dutch: Algemene Bedrijfsgroepen Centrale, ABC) was a general union in the Netherlands, focusing on manufacturing industries.

== History ==
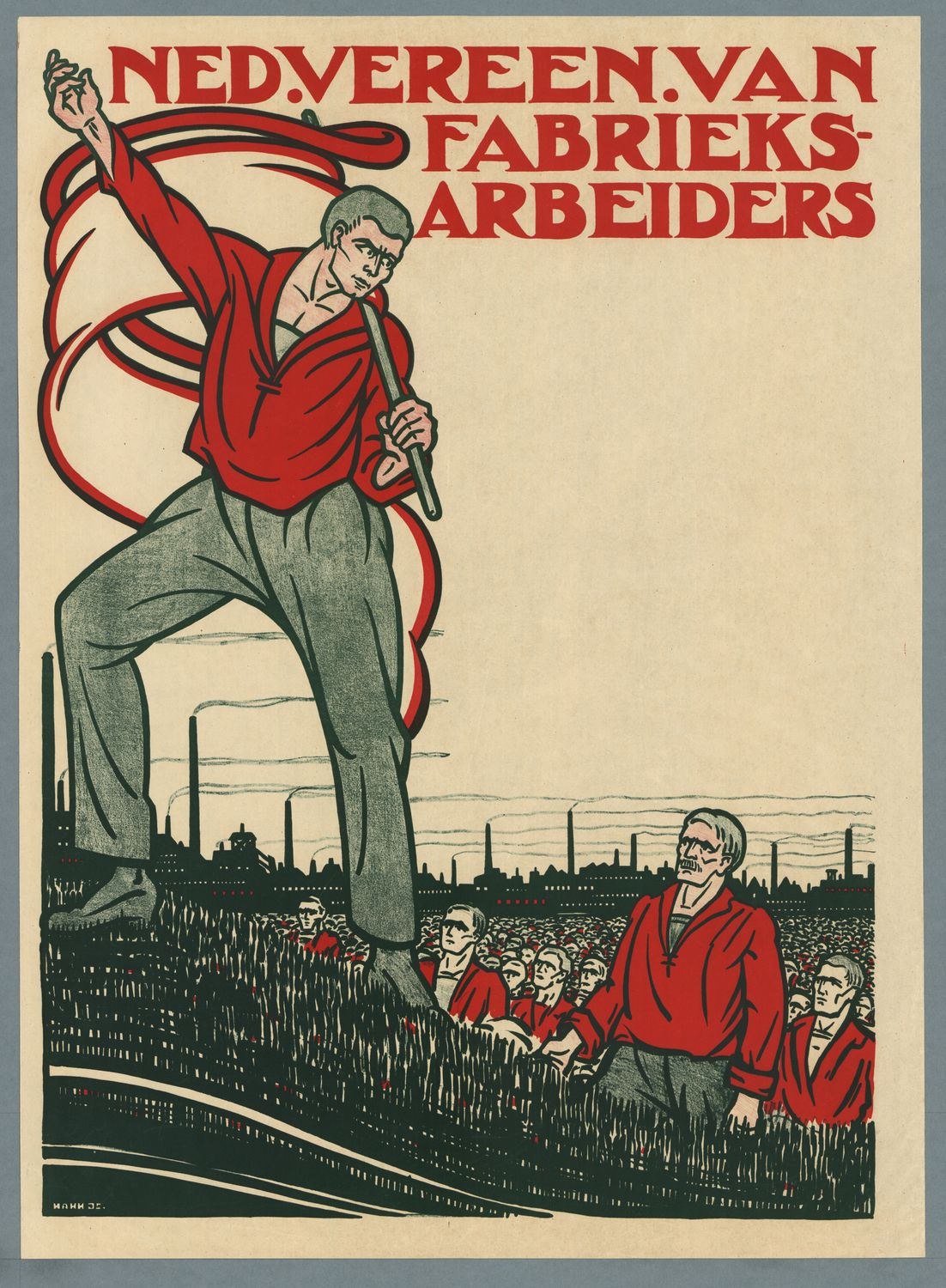
Poster for the NVvFA, designed by Albert Hahn jr., ca. 1925

The union was founded in 1907 by Roel Stenhuis, as the Dutch Union of Factory Workers (Dutch: Nederlandse Vereniging van Fabrieksarbeiders, NVvFA). It affiliated to the recently founded Dutch Confederation of Trade Unions. It initially had only 131 members, and just 386 in 1912, but it grew rapidly during World War I, and by 1919 had more than 10,000 members. In 1926, the Glass and Pottery Union merged in.

On 1 January 1950, the union renamed itself as the "General Union of Miscellaneous Industries". In 1954, the General Union of Private Sector Hygiene and Household Services merged in. The General Dutch Industrial Union of the Tobacco Industry merged in at the start of 1969, followed in 1970 by the General Dutch Industrial Union of the Mining Industry. By the end of that year, it had 51,920 members, of whom, 48% worked in the chemical industry, 18% in food production, 11% in ceramics and glass, 10% in paper and printing, 9% in personal services, and the remainder in areas including stoneworking and shoemaking.

The union merged with the General Dutch Industrial Union of the Metal and Electronic Industries and the General Industrial Union of Textiles and Clothing on the 1 January 1972, forming the Industrial Workers' Union NVV.

== Presidents ==
1907: Roel Stenhuis
1921: Klaas de Jonge
1950: Menzo ter Borch
1962: Willem Liefaard
