= International Biosciences =

UK-based DNA testing company

- Industry: Biotechnology
- Founded: 2005 in the United Kingdom
- Area served: Worldwide
- Products: Natera Panorama prenatal test; peace of mind relationship tests, ancestry and genetic predisposition tests.
- Services: DNA Testing
- Website: www.ibdna.com

International Biosciences (IBDNA), is a UK-based DNA testing company with offices in Brighton, East Sussex. The company offers a range of DNA tests including the Natera Panorama prenatal test as well as peace of mind relationship tests, ancestry and genetic predisposition testing., International Biosciences operates worldwide and has operations in Ireland, France, Germany, Spain, Italy, Canada and India.

== History ==
Founded in 2005, the company was the subject of criticism in July 2009 when it launched over-the-counter paternity tests via Pharmacies across the United Kingdom making it the first company to retail DNA kits on the high street. Josephine Quintavalle, of Comment on Reproductive Ethics, said the easy availability of the test raised deep concerns The sales initiative was very similar to that successfully employed in the US by Identigene, L.L.C. a subsidiary of Sorenson Genomics, LLC.
