= Ron Todd (trade unionist) =

- Portrait by Nick Sinclair, 1991
- Born: 11 March 1927; Walthamstow, London, England
- Died: 30 April 2005 (aged 78); Dagenham, London, England
- Occupation: Trade unionist
- Years active: 1955–1992
- Known for: Former General Secretary of the TGWU and former Vice President of the Campaign for Nuclear Disarmament
- Notable work: On His Todd, Still on His Todd, Odd Thoughts in Retirement, More Odd Thoughts, A Collection of Odd Thoughts
- Title: General Secretary of the Transport and General Workers Union
- Term: 1985–1992
- Predecessor: Moss Evans
- Successor: Bill Morris
- Political party: Labour Party
- Movement: Trade Union, Anti-Apartheid, Campaign for Nuclear Disarmament
- Opponent: George Wright Margaret Thatcher Neil Kinnock
- Spouse: Josephine Todd (née Tarrant)
- Children: 3
- Parents: George Thomas Todd (father); Emily Todd (née Pauline) (mother)

Ronald Todd (11 March 1927 – 30 April 2005) was an English Trade union leader who served as the General Secretary of the Transport and General Workers' Union (which is now Unite the Union) from 1985 until 1992. He was a member of the General Council of the Trades Union Congress, served as the Chair of the (TUC) International Committee, a member of the National Economic Development Council and president of the Trade Union Unity Trust and was an honorary vice-president of the Campaign for Nuclear Disarmament. He was a committed Internationalist, a relentless campaigner for Nuclear disarmament and an active campaigner in the Anti-Apartheid Movement, who counted Nelson Mandela as a close friend.

He was one of the most respected union officials of his generation and led the biggest trade union in the country during most of the Margaret Thatcher years, a period that could be counted as one of the most difficult ones for the trade union movement in the 20th century.

== Early life ==
Born in Walthamstow, London, Ron was the fifth child of Emily (née Pauline) and George Thomas Todd. His father was a stallholder in a local street market and his mother was a pianist who accompanied silent film. Owing to his mother's influence he grew up with a love of Victorian ballads and music hall songs and became an accomplished pianist himself. The family was Roman Catholic and Todd attended St Patrick's school, where he was an altar boy.

During the war, a German bomb that landed on the family's air-raid shelter knocked Todd out cold. When he came round, he and his mother sang for two hours before they were dug out. Todd left school at the age of 14 to sweep floors in a barber's shop; he then worked as a plumber's mate. In 1945 at the age of 18 he married Josephine Tarrant. In the same year he got a call up to the Royal Marines. He had initially favoured the Royal Navy, but he later recalled with pride that he and his father were the first father and son in the Marines to appear on the parade ground together. For a time he served alongside his father in the Marines when they were posted to Hong Kong with 42 Commando. While in the Far East he took part in the liberation of British, Australian, New Zealand and some American troops from Japanese prisoner-of-war-camps, and then guarded captured Japanese.

On demobilisation in 1947, he returned home and worked in the Labour Party (UK) for his local MP, the Prime Minister Clement Attlee. Todd became a gas fitter in Walthamstow, but then in 1955 he went to the new Ford plant to work as an engineer. During his working days on the Ford assembly line at Dagenham, his elder brother was a supervisor while Ron remained a shopfloor "spanner-and-screwdriver" man on the line before becoming deputy convenor of Ford shop stewards. He joined the Transport and General Workers' Union.

== Trade union career and politics ==
Not long after starting work at the Ford plant Todd became a shop steward and soon deputy convener of shop stewards. In 1962, he became a full-time T&G officer based at the Edmonton office and was responsible for chemical, engineering and metal groups. The General Secretary of the T&G, Jack Jones, moved Todd to the Stratford office, so that he could take charge of the interests of workers at the Dagenham plant. Todd was made Regional Secretary for London and the South-East in 1975 and responsible for half a million or more members. He became friendly with Moss Evans, then responsible for the motor industry and who succeeded Jones in 1978 as General Secretary. Evans appointed Todd as National Organiser, at the centre of the T&G high command.

Todd became a household name as the officer in charge of the Ford pay negotiations at the end of the Callaghan government in the autumn of 1978. He won a 17 per cent pay rise for workers, much greater than the Government's pay raise norm of 5 per cent. Callaghan was faced with a Commons vote of confidence in the Government's pay policy. Evans and Todd believed that they were correct to put the interests of their members before the entreaties of Labour ministers. Todd was adamant that the function of trade unions is to negotiate on behalf of their members and that it was Labour ministers by their actions who had destroyed the Labour government, and not the trade unions, in the aftermath of the Winter of Discontent, 1978–79.

Todd had assumed that National Organiser would be his last job and that he would retire at the same moment as Moss Evans, however Evans gave up due to ill-health and retired to King's Lynn in Norfolk, persuading Todd to stand for election as General Secretary.

=== General secretaryship of TGWU ===
==== First ballot (1984–1985) ====
After being elected to succeed Moss Evans as the union's seventh general secretary in 1985, following a second ballot, Todd was also named as an honorary vice-president of the Campaign for Nuclear Disarmament. In demanding such a vote he had two objectives in mind - to stymie the Daily Mail and the Daily Express from making the most of allegations of wrongdoing to drag the Transport and General Workers' name into the dirt; and to stop the George Wright faction on his own executive using the allegations against him. Todd earned a reputation for his commitment to human rights and was a vocal opponent of apartheid in South Africa.

Todd's final move before he retired was to pave the way for his successor, Bill Morris, the first black leader of a major British trade union.

== Retirement ==
On his retirement, Todd received a congratulatory telegram from the Queen Mother in her capacity as an honorary member of the union's branch at Smithfield meat market.

In 1995 he helped form the Romford & District Royal Marines Association and was its first chairman. He devoted some of his time in retirement to working with the deaf, for which he learnt sign language. He also published five books of poetry, proceeds of which he donated to charities; he was writing his poems on current affairs up to his final months.

== Death ==
On 30 April 2005 Todd died from leukaemia, from which he had been suffering for some time. He was survived by three children, one son and two daughters and five grandchildren.

Upon his death the T&G issued the following statement:

Ron Todd's passing is a sad blow for the T&G. Ron carried the trade union flame throughout the darkest days of Thatcherism, leading the T&G in very difficult years with decency, integrity and commitment. Ron always put the members' interests first, and remained rock-solid to the end in his loyalty to the enduring values of the labour movement. His passing will be mourned not just by his family and by trade unionists throughout Britain, but also in South Africa, where his campaigning lead against apartheid will always be remembered. So too will his unwavering commitment to nuclear disarmament. In saluting his memory, the T&G pledges to stay true to Ron Todd's principles.

Tributes were paid to him from leading figures across the labour movement, led by the then Prime Minister Tony Blair who said: "He was a greatly respected trade union leader and a good friend. Despite leading his union at a difficult time he was always a strong supporter of the Labour Party. I have always been grateful for the support he gave me in difficult circumstances when I was employment spokesman when we were changing the party’s position on employment law. He will be sadly missed". Tony Woodley remarked: ""Ron carried the trade union flame throughout the darkest days of Thatcherism, leading the T&G in very difficult years with decency, integrity and commitment. Ron always put the members' interests first and remained rock solid to the union in his loyalty to the enduring values of the Labour movement. His passing will be mourned not just by his family and by trade unionists throughout Britain but also in South Africa where his campaigning commitment against apartheid will always be remembered. So too will be his unwavering commitment to nuclear disarmament". Brendan Barber, the then general secretary of the TUC said: "Ron Todd was a trade unionist of total integrity, passion and commitment to fairness for working people as well as having a deep commitment to the cause of peace". Ken Livingstone the then Mayor of London remarked: "Ron Todd was one of the most decent men I have ever met in public life. He was a man of absolute integrity, a giant of the trade union movement and everyone will miss him and his advice immensely. "Ron was a great ally in the London Labour Party and it was only because of his key role over many years that London Labour had such a radical agenda when we won the GLC elections in 1981. He was both a powerful advocate of the interests of working people and a kind and generous man". While Tony Benn said: 'He was a great campaigner for peace, a very principled man and a very likable man.'

His funeral was held at Dagenham & Redbridge F.C. Victoria Road ground on 10 May 2005. There was a London Bus laid on and trade unionists with their banners lined the streets. The Romford & District Royal Marines Association and the Royal Navy Association formed a guard of honour as his coffin entered the packed-out hall. Gordon Brown, John Prescott and Tony Benn were some of the recognisable faces among the many attendees.

== Legacy ==
Unite the Union London and Eastern branch office was named in his honour, as Ron Todd House.

A street is named after him in Dagenham, Ron Todd Close.

There is an annual lecture in his memory called the Ron Todd Memorial Lecture.

A social enterprise called Community Court Yard was founded to further his principles and beliefs.

A registered charity called the Ron Todd Foundation continues to fight on the issues that were important to him, and to keep his memory alive.

=== Community Court Yard ===
Community Court Yard is a social enterprise founded by Ron Todd's family, and run by his grand daughter Bianca Todd. The organisation was founded on 7 July 2011.

=== Annual Ron Todd Memorial Lecture ===
The Ron Todd Memorial Lecture is an annual event put on by the Ron Todd Foundation in order to memorialise the work and life of Ron Todd. At the lecture the Ron Todd Awards are given out to individuals and groups that have contributed to their communities.

=== Ron Todd Foundation ===
The Ron Todd Foundation is a registered charity founded by Ron Todd's grand daughter Bianca Todd on 2 September 2016. It was created to build on the work started by Community Court Yard

Trade union offices
Preceded by Moss Evans	General Secretary of the Transport and General Workers Union; 1985–1992	Succeeded by Bill Morris
