= Miners' International Federation =

- Merged into: International Federation of Chemical, Energy, Mine and General Workers' Unions
- Founded: 1890
- Dissolved: 1995
- Headquarters: Russell Square, London (1890–1984); Belgium (1985–1995)
- Location: International
- Members: 4.2 million (1994)
- Affiliations: ICFTU

The Miners' International Federation (MIF), sometimes known as the International Federation of Miners, was a global union federation of trade unions.

== History ==
Wirtz (1962) documented that the Miners International Federation (MIF) 'had its origin in a series of four international workers' congresses which met between 1883 and 1889 in Paris and London.' The MIF was subsequently established in 1890 at a four-day event that was held in Jolimont, Belgium, which was attended by 111 representatives of miners' organizations from Austria, Belgium, France, Germany and the United Kingdom. The subsequent congresses which were held annually until 1900 were representative of the five countries that had sent delegates to the first congress.

The MIF was initially one of the largest union federations, with membership reaching 1.2 million in 1913, and this grew slightly to 1.5 million in 1931.

From the 1950s, the MIF began to campaign for common international minimum working conditions. However, with reductions in the number of miners in its heartland of Western Europe, its overall membership began to fall, and was below one million by 1976.

The union was based in London for many years, with the British National Union of Mineworkers (NUM) as its largest affiliate. In 1983, Arthur Scargill, leader of the NUM, proposed dissolving the federation and forming a new one with the World Federation of Trade Unions-affiliated Trade Unions International of Miners. This was opposed by a majority of members, but the NUM nevertheless withdrew, leaving the federation to relocate its headquarters to Brussels and struggle with a shortage of funds.

The MIF began recruiting unions in other parts of the world, and by 1994 consisted of 58 unions with 4.2 million members. In 1995, it merged with the International Federation of Chemical and General Workers' Unions to form the International Federation of Chemical, Energy, Mine and General Workers' Unions.

== Affiliates ==
In 1960, the following unions were affiliated to the federation:

Union	Country	Affiliated membership
All Japan Federation of Metal Miners' Unions	Japan	57,000
Associated Mineworkers of Southern Rhodesia	Southern Rhodesia	1,000
Confederation of Copper Workers	Chile	24,000
Cyprus Federation of Free Miners	Cyprus	1,530
Federation of Miners of Greece	Greece	30,000
Federation of Mine Workers	Tunisia	6,125
Free Italian Federation of Workers in Mining Industries	Italy	12,656
General Dutch Industrial Union of the Mining Industry	Netherlands	3,000
General Union of Spanish Workers	Spain	Unknown
Ghana Mine Workers' Union	Ghana	40,000
Indian National Mineworkers' Federation	India	150,000
Japan Coal Miners' Union	Japan	200,441
Korean Mine Workers' Federation	South Korea	28,246
Luxembourg Workers' Federation	Luxembourg	2,000
Manpower Citizens' Association	British Guiana	2,000
Miners' Federation	France	21,000
National Coal Mine Workers' Union	Japan	75,000
National Mines and Allied Workers' Union	Philippines	3,000
National Union of Mine and Quarry Workers	Italy	14,610
National Union of Mineworkers	United Kingdom	675,000
Nigerian Mineworkers' Federation	Nigeria	10,000
Northern Rhodesian African Mineworkers' Union	Northern Rhodesia	36,000
Northern Rhodesia Mine Workers' Union	Northern Rhodesia	4,500
Norwegian Union of General Workers	Norway	6,000
Suriname Mine Workers' Union	Suriname	80
Swedish Miners' Union	Sweden	14,000
Tanganyika Mine Workers' Union	Tanganyika	1,000
Union of Metal, Mining and Energy	Austria	25,000
Union of Mineworkers of Belgium	Belgium	36,000
United Mine Workers of America	United States	600,000
United Mineworkers of New Zealand	New Zealand	3,320
United Mineworkers of Sierra Leone	Sierra Leone	5,500
Union of Mining and Energy	West Germany	461,674
Union of Mining, Metallurgical and Chemical Workers	Yugoslavia	95,000

== Leadership ==
=== Secretaries ===
1890: Thomas Ashton
1921: Frank Hodges
1927: Achille Delattre
1934: Ebby Edwards
1947: Will Lawther
1957: Ernest Jones
1960: Ted Jones
1963: Dennis Edwards
1976: Peter Tait
1984: Jan Olyslaegers
1989: Peter Michalzik

=== Presidents ===
1910s: Robert Smillie
1921: Herbert Smith
1929: Joseph Dejardin
1932: Fritz Husemann
1934: Pierre Vigne
1945: Achille Delattre
1954: Heinrich Imig
1956: Nicolas Dethier
1963: Heinrich Gutermuth
1967: Walter Arendt
1969:
1971: Adolf Schmidt
1984: Anders Stendalen
