= Bollman =

Bollman or Bollmann is a surname. Notable people with the surname include:

== Bollman ==
- Charles Harvey Bollman (1868–1889), American naturalist
- Eric Bollman (1769–1821), German physician
- Harry Bollman (1902–1984), Australian rules footballer
- Jim Bollman (born 1954), American college football coach
- Nicole Bollman, South African politician
- Ryan Bollman (born 1972), American film and television actor
- Wendel Bollman (1814–1884), American civil engineer

== Bollmann ==
- Albert Bollmann (1889–1959), German footballer
- Ernst Bollmann (1899–1974), German politician
- Gerd Bollmann (1947–2017), German politician
- Gereon Bollmann (born 1953), German politician
- Hannelore Bollmann (1925–2023), German film actress
- Hendrik Bollmann (born 1982), German politician
- Horst Bollmann (1925–2014), German film and television actor
- Markus Bollmann (born 1981), German footballer

== See also ==
- Ex parte Bollman, 1807 United States Supreme Court case
- Bollman Hat Company
- Bolman (disambiguation)
- Boltzmann (disambiguation)
- Gary Ballman (1940–2004), American football player
