= Mine Workers' Union =

The Mine Workers' Union or Mineworkers' Union is the name of:

- Andhra Pradesh Mica Mine Workers Union, current trade union in India
- Canadian Mineworkers Union, former trade union
- Ghana Mine Workers' Union, current trade union
- Mine Workers' Union of Canada, former trade union
- Mineworkers Union of Namibia, current trade union
- Mine Workers' Union (South Africa), former name of current trade union
- Northern Rhodesian African Mineworkers' Union, former trade union
- United Mine Workers Union, current trade union in the United States

== See also ==
- National Union of Mineworkers (disambiguation)
