= Herne – Bochum II =

Federal electoral district of Germany

140 Herne – Bochum II
- Electoral district for the Bundestag
- Herne – Bochum II in 2025
- State: North Rhine-Westphalia
- Population: 244,400 (2019)
- Electorate: 173,939 (2021)
- Major settlements: Herne; Bochum (partial)
- Area: 93.8 km^{2}

Current electoral district
- Created: 1949
- Party: SPD
- Member: Hendrik Bollmann
- Elected: 2025

Herne – Bochum II is an electoral constituency (German: Wahlkreis) represented in the Bundestag. It elects one member via first-past-the-post voting. Under the current constituency numbering system, it is designated as constituency 140. It is located in the Ruhr region of North Rhine-Westphalia, comprising the city of Herne and the eastern part of the city of Bochum.

Herne – Bochum II was created for the inaugural 1949 federal election. From 2013 to 2025, it was represented by Michelle Müntefering of the Social Democratic Party (SPD). Since 2025 it has been represented by Hendrik Bollmann of the SPD.

== Geography ==
Herne – Bochum II is located in the Ruhr region of North Rhine-Westphalia. As of the 2021 federal election, it comprises the entirety of the independent city of Herne and the city districts (Stadtbezirke) of 3 Bochum-Nord and 4 Bochum-Ost from the independent city of Bochum.

== History ==
Herne – Bochum II was created in 1949, then known as Herne – Castrop-Rauxel. From 1980 through 1994, it was named Herne. In the 1998 election, it was named Herne – Bochum III. It acquired its current name in the 2002 election. In the 1949 election, it was North Rhine-Westphalia constituency 53 in the numbering system. From 1953 through 1961, it was number 112. From 1965 through 1976, it was number 111. From 1980 through 1998, it was number 112. From 2002 through 2009, it was number 142. In the 2013 through 2021 elections, it was number 141. From the 2025 election, it has been number 140.

Originally, the constituency comprised the independent cities of Herne and Castrop-Rauxel. From 1980 through 1994, it was coterminous with the independent city of Herne. In the 1998 election, it comprised Herne as well as the Stadtteile of Bergen and Hiltrop from the independent city of Bochum. It acquired its current borders in the 2002 election.

Election	No.	Name	Borders
1949	53	Herne – Castrop-Rauxel	Herne city; Castrop-Rauxel city
1953	112	Herne – Castrop-Rauxel	Herne city; Castrop-Rauxel city
1957	112	Herne – Castrop-Rauxel	Herne city; Castrop-Rauxel city
1961	112	Herne – Castrop-Rauxel	Herne city; Castrop-Rauxel city
1965	111	Herne – Castrop-Rauxel	Herne city; Castrop-Rauxel city
1969	111	Herne – Castrop-Rauxel	Herne city; Castrop-Rauxel city
1972	111	Herne – Castrop-Rauxel	Herne city; Castrop-Rauxel city
1976	111	Herne – Castrop-Rauxel	Herne city; Castrop-Rauxel city
1980	112	Herne	Herne city
1983	112	Herne	Herne city
1987	112	Herne	Herne city
1990	112	Herne	Herne city
1994	112	Herne	Herne city
1998	112	Herne – Bochum III	Herne city; Bochum city (only Bergen and Hiltrop Stadtteile)
2002	142	Herne – Bochum II	Herne city; Bochum city (only 3 Bochum-Nord and 4 Bochum-Ost Stadtbezirke)
2005	142	Herne – Bochum II	Herne city; Bochum city (only 3 Bochum-Nord and 4 Bochum-Ost Stadtbezirke)
2009	142	Herne – Bochum II	Herne city; Bochum city (only 3 Bochum-Nord and 4 Bochum-Ost Stadtbezirke)
2013	141	Herne – Bochum II	Herne city; Bochum city (only 3 Bochum-Nord and 4 Bochum-Ost Stadtbezirke)
2017	141	Herne – Bochum II	Herne city; Bochum city (only 3 Bochum-Nord and 4 Bochum-Ost Stadtbezirke)
2021	141	Herne – Bochum II	Herne city; Bochum city (only 3 Bochum-Nord and 4 Bochum-Ost Stadtbezirke)
2025	140	Herne – Bochum II	Herne city; Bochum city (only 3 Bochum-Nord and 4 Bochum-Ost Stadtbezirke)

== Members ==
The constituency has been held by the Social Democratic Party (SPD) during all but two Bundestag terms since its creation. It was first represented by Heinrich Imig of the SPD 1949 until 1953, when it was won by Friedrich Welskop of the Christian Democratic Union (CDU). Ulrich Berger retained it for the CDU in the 1957 election, but Herbert Kriedemann regained it for the SPD in 1961 and served until 1972. Walter Arendt succeeded him and was representative until 1980, followed by Heinz Westphal until 1990. Dieter Maaß served from 1990 to 2002, when he was succeeded by Gerd Bollmann. Michelle Müntefering was elected in 2013, and re-elected in 2017 and 2021. In 2025 Müntefering was succeeded by Hendrik Bollmann.

Election	Member	Party	%
1949	Heinrich Imig	SPD	41.7
1953	Friedrich Welskop	CDU	44.1
1957	Ulrich Berger	CDU	47.9
1961	Herbert Kriedemann	SPD	48.4
1965	Herbert Kriedemann	SPD	54.9
1969	Herbert Kriedemann	SPD	57.7
1972	Walter Arendt	SPD	66.0
1976	Walter Arendt	SPD	62.9
1980	Heinz Westphal	SPD	64.8
1983	Heinz Westphal	SPD	61.0
1987	Heinz Westphal	SPD	61.1
1990	Dieter Maaß	SPD	58.4
1994	Dieter Maaß	SPD	62.2
1998	Dieter Maaß	SPD	65.5
2002	Gerd Bollmann	SPD	61.5
2005	Gerd Bollmann	SPD	59.4
2009	Gerd Bollmann	SPD	51.7
2013	Michelle Müntefering	SPD	48.7
2017	Michelle Müntefering	SPD	41.8
2021	Michelle Müntefering	SPD	43.4
2025	Hendrik Bollmann	SPD	33.5

== Election results ==
=== 2025 election ===
Federal election (2025): Herne – Bochum II
Notes:	Blue background denotes the winner of the electorate vote. Pink background denotes a candidate elected from their party list. Yellow background denotes an electorate win by a list member, or other incumbent. A ✓ or ✗ denotes status of any incumbent, win or lose respectively.						
Party	Candidate	Votes	%	±%	Party votes	%	±%
SPD	✓ Hendrik Bollmann	43,832	33.5	▼9.9	33,909	25.9	▼12.4
CDU	Christoph Bußmann	31,032	23.7	▲4.0	29,840	22.8	▲3.7
AfD	Daniel Zerbin	28,088	21.5	▲11.7	27,453	20.9	▲11.2
Greens	Anna di Bari	11,111	8.5	▼3.2	11,719	8.9	▼3.7
Left	Patrick Gawliczek	10,878	8.3	▲4.5	12,576	9.6	▲5.5
BSW					6,076	4.6	
FDP	Moritz Ritterswürden	2,948	2.3	▼4.7	3,893	3.0	▼5.8
Tierschutzpartei					2,327	1.8	▼0.2
Volt	Christian Sontag	1,267	1.0		708	0.5	▲0.3
BD	Markus Schröder	1,159	0.9		333	0.3	
PARTEI				▼2.1	792	0.6	▼0.6
FW				▼1.2	484	0.4	▼0.3
MLPD	Peter Weispfenning	366	0.3	▲0.1	148	0.1	0.0
Team Todenhöfer					292	0.2	▼0.9
PdF					245	0.2	▲0.1
dieBasis				▼1.0	229	0.2	▼0.6
Values					78	0.1	
MERA25					61	0.0	
Pirates							▼0.5
Gesundheitsforschung							▼0.1
Humanists							▼0.1
ÖDP							▼0.1
Bündnis C							▼0.1
SGP							0.0
Informal votes		1,513			1,031		
Total valid votes		130,681			131,163		
Turnout		132,194	77.6	▲6.8			
SPD hold	Majority	12,800	9.8				

=== 2021 election ===
Federal election (2021): Herne – Bochum II
Notes:	Blue background denotes the winner of the electorate vote. Pink background denotes a candidate elected from their party list. Yellow background denotes an electorate win by a list member, or other incumbent. A ✓ or ✗ denotes status of any incumbent, win or lose respectively.						
Party	Candidate	Votes	%	±%	Party votes	%	±%
SPD	✓ Michelle Müntefering	52,792	43.4	▲1.6	46,578	38.2	▲4.0
CDU	Christoph Bußmann	24,027	19.8	▼4.4	23,164	19.0	▼4.4
Greens	Jacob Liedtke	14,262	11.7	▲6.2	15,383	12.6	▲6.8
AfD	Markus Dossenbach	11,863	9.8	▼3.6	11,882	9.8	▼3.7
FDP	Klaus Füßmann	8,455	7.0	▲0.2	10,623	8.7	▼0.4
Left	Felix Oekentorp	4,667	3.8	▼4.2	5,029	4.1	▼4.5
Tierschutzpartei					2,357	1.9	▲0.8
PARTEI	Nana Miriam Sippel	2,550	2.1		1,467	1.2	▲0.2
Team Todenhöfer					1,395	1.1	
FW	Andreas Walter	1,423	1.2		818	0.7	▲0.4
dieBasis	Sven Heiermann	1,251	1.0		927	0.8	
Pirates					582	0.5	▼0.1
Volt					273	0.2	
LIEBE					226	0.2	
Gesundheitsforschung					169	0.1	0.0
NPD					168	0.1	▼0.3
MLPD	Peter Weispfenning	220	0.2	▼0.1	124	0.1	▼0.1
V-Partei3					110	0.1	0.0
Humanists					109	0.1	0.0
LfK					106	0.1	
ÖDP					76	0.1	0.0
Bündnis C					68	0.1	
du.					67	0.1	
PdF					49	0.0	
LKR					46	0.0	
DKP					34	0.0	0.0
SGP					11	0.0	0.0
Informal votes		1,535			1,204		
Total valid votes		121,510			121,841		
Turnout		123,045	70.7	▼0.7			
SPD hold	Majority	28,765	23.6	▲6.0			

=== 2017 election ===
Federal election (2017): Herne – Bochum II
Notes:	Blue background denotes the winner of the electorate vote. Pink background denotes a candidate elected from their party list. Yellow background denotes an electorate win by a list member, or other incumbent. A ✓ or ✗ denotes status of any incumbent, win or lose respectively.						
Party	Candidate	Votes	%	±%	Party votes	%	±%
SPD	✓ Michelle Müntefering	52,672	41.9	▼6.8	43,312	34.2	▼9.6
CDU	Paul Ziemiak	30,361	24.1	▼6.2	29,629	23.4	▼4.7
AfD	Armin Wolf	16,799	13.4		17,001	13.4	▲9.5
Left	Daniel Kleibömer	10,064	8.0	▲0.4	10,860	8.6	▲0.5
FDP	Klaus-Wilhelm Füßmann	8,448	6.7	▲5.2	11,560	9.1	▲6.3
Greens	Sabine von der Beck	6,992	5.6	▼0.2	7,414	5.9	▼0.8
Tierschutzpartei					1,435	1.1	
PARTEI					1,234	1.0	▲0.6
AD-DEMOKRATEN					1,106	0.9	
Pirates					788	0.6	▼1.8
NPD					510	0.4	▼1.4
FW					321	0.3	▲0.1
MLPD	Peter Georg Weispfenning	408	0.3	0.0	201	0.2	0.0
Gesundheitsforschung					177	0.1	
BGE					159	0.1	
Volksabstimmung					135	0.1	▼0.1
V-Partei³					133	0.1	
ÖDP					131	0.1	0.0
DiB					129	0.1	
DM					122	0.1	
Die Humanisten					83	0.1	
SGP					27	0.0	0.0
DKP					23	0.0	
Informal votes		2,230			1,484		
Total valid votes		125,744			126,490		
Turnout		127,974	71.4	▲2.4			
SPD hold	Majority	22,311	17.8	▼0.5			

=== 2013 election ===
Federal election (2013): Herne – Bochum II
Notes:	Blue background denotes the winner of the electorate vote. Pink background denotes a candidate elected from their party list. Yellow background denotes an electorate win by a list member, or other incumbent. A ✓ or ✗ denotes status of any incumbent, win or lose respectively.						
Party	Candidate	Votes	%	±%	Party votes	%	±%
SPD	Michelle Müntefering	60,610	48.7	▼2.6	54,876	43.9	▲3.6
CDU	Ingrid Fischbach	37,807	30.4	▲3.5	35,149	28.1	▲5.4
Left	Markus Dowe	9,500	7.6		10,162	8.1	▼4.7
Greens	Sabine von der Beck	7,194	5.8	▼4.1	8,275	6.6	▼2.1
AfD					4,949	4.0	
Pirates	Andreas Prennig	3,779	3.0		3,078	2.5	▲0.8
NPD	Markus Schumacher	3,348	2.7	▲0.6	2,225	1.8	▲0.5
FDP	Frank Leschowski	1,894	1.5	▼5.3	3,528	2.8	▼6.3
PARTEI					480	0.4	
PRO					463	0.4	
REP					439	0.4	▼0.8
Volksabstimmung					267	0.2	▲0.1
BIG					224	0.2	
FW					217	0.2	
MLPD	Peter Georg Weispfenning	398	0.3	▼0.6	198	0.2	0.0
ÖDP					156	0.1	▲0.1
Nichtwahler					152	0.1	
RRP					89	0.1	▼0.1
Party of Reason					88	0.1	
Die Rechte					54	0.0	
PSG					40	0.0	0.0
BüSo					24	0.0	0.0
Informal votes		2,397			1,794		
Total valid votes		124,530			125,133		
Turnout		126,927	69.0	▲0.9			
SPD hold	Majority	22,803	18.3	▼6.1			

=== 2009 election ===
Federal election (2009): Herne – Bochum II
Notes:	Blue background denotes the winner of the electorate vote. Pink background denotes a candidate elected from their party list. Yellow background denotes an electorate win by a list member, or other incumbent. A ✓ or ✗ denotes status of any incumbent, win or lose respectively.						
Party	Candidate	Votes	%	±%	Party votes	%	±%
SPD	✓ Gerd Bollmann	64,331	51.3	▼8.1	50,922	40.2	▼13.7
CDU	Ingrid Fischbach	33,693	26.9	▲1.2	28,681	22.7	▲0.2
Left					16,261	12.8	▲5.1
Greens	Jörg Höhfeld	12,393	9.9	▲6.4	11,074	8.7	▲2.3
FDP	Klaus-Wilhelm Füßmann	8,545	6.8	▲4.4	11,591	9.2	▲3.7
Pirates					2,074	1.6	
REP	Bernd Blech	2,768	2.2	▲1.1	1,418	1.1	▲0.2
NPD	Markus Schumacher	2,570	2.0	▲1.0	1,563	1.2	▲0.3
Tierschutzpartei					944	0.7	▲0.1
FAMILIE					604	0.5	0.0
RENTNER					568	0.4	
RRP					236	0.2	
MLPD	Peter Georg Weispfenning	1,175	0.9	▲0.8	175	0.1	0.0
DVU					164	0.1	
Volksabstimmung					93	0.1	0.0
ÖDP					81	0.1	
Centre					60	0.0	0.0
PSG					34	0.0	0.0
BüSo					20	0.0	0.0
Informal votes		3,036			1,948		
Total valid votes		125,475			126,563		
Turnout		128,511	68.1	▼8.3			
SPD hold	Majority	30,638	24.4	▼9.0			

=== 2005 election ===
Federal election (2005): Herne – Bochum II
Notes:	Blue background denotes the winner of the electorate vote. Pink background denotes a candidate elected from their party list. Yellow background denotes an electorate win by a list member, or other incumbent. A ✓ or ✗ denotes status of any incumbent, win or lose respectively.						
Party	Candidate	Votes	%	±%	Party votes	%	±%
SPD	✓ Gerd Bollmann	85,964	59.4	▼2.1	78,062	54.0	▼3.8
CDU	Ingrid Fischbach	37,096	25.6	▼0.2	32,499	22.5	▼0.48
Left	Jürgen Klute	9,738	6.7	▲5.0	11,279	7.8	▲6.2
Greens	Christian Michalak	5,058	3.5	▼1.3	9,369	6.5	▼1.0
FDP	Klaus-Wilhelm Füßmann	3,487	2.4	▼1.8	7,852	5.4	▼0.48
REP	Wilhelm Elbracht	1,558	1.1		1,368	0.9	0.0
NPD	Bernhard Adamek	1,503	1.0		1,399	1.0	▲0.6
Tierschutzpartei					903	0.6	▲0.1
Familie					631	0.4	▲0.2
GRAUEN					563	0.4	▲0.2
MLPD	Sonja Borgwardt	268	0.2		245	0.2	
PBC					174	0.1	▼0.1
From Now on... Democracy Through Referendum					141	0.1	
Socialist Equality Party					72	0.0	
Centre					42	0.0	
BüSo					38	0.0	
Informal votes		2,348			2,383		
Total valid votes		144,672			144,637		
Turnout		147,020	76.3	▼1.6			
SPD hold	Majority	48,868	33.8				
