= Boldman =

Boldman is a surname. Notable people with the surname include:

- Ellie Boldman (born 1975), American attorney and politician
- Spencer Boldman (born 1992), American actor

== See also ==
- Bodman
- Bollman
