= Joseph Dejardin =

Belgian politician (1873–1932)

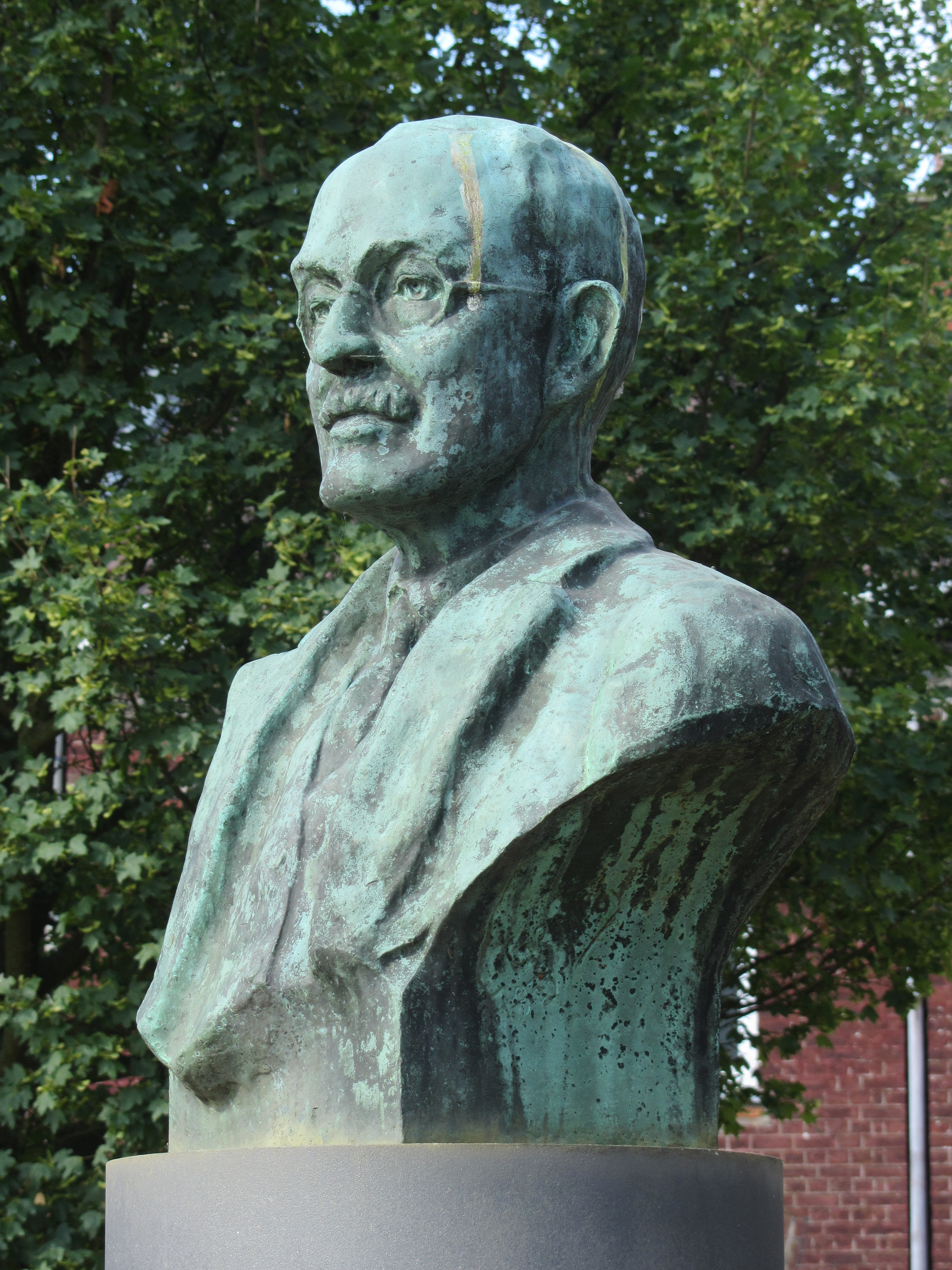
Statue of Joseph Dejardin

Joseph Dejardin (21 March 1873 – 28 October 1932) was a Belgian trade unionist and politician.

Born in Grivegnée, Dejardin worked at a coal mine from the age of eleven. He joined the Union of Mineworkers of Belgium and eventually rose to become its president. He also became the president of the Miners' International Federation.

In 1903, Dejardin was elected as a councillor in Beyne-Heusay, and he served as mayor from 1914 to 1921. In 1909, he was elected to represent the Liège for the Parti Socialiste in the Chamber of Representatives, serving until his death.

Dejardin's sister, Lucie, also became a politician.

Trade union offices
Preceded by Herbert Smith	President of the Miners' International Federation; 1929–1932	Succeeded by Fritz Husemann
