= Nicolas Dethier =

Belgian politician and trade unionist

- Born: September 29, 1888; Beyne-Heusay
- Died: February 12, 1976 (aged 87)
- Occupations: politician trade unionist

Nicolas Dethier (29 September 1888 – 12 February 1976) was a Belgian trade unionist and politician.

Born in Beyne-Heusay, Dethier left school at the age of twelve and became a coal miner. In 1906, he joined the Federation of Miners of Liege, and in 1908 he became the secretary of his local section of the union. In 1913, he became the full-time secretary of the Miners Union of the Plateau of Herve, then in 1920 he won election as assistant secretary of the newly-founded Union of Mineworkers of Belgium. In 1935, he became the secretary of the union, serving until 1958, when he became its treasurer, then in 1960 he won election as its president. In 1954, Dethier was elected as vice-president of the Miners' International Federation, then in 1956 he succeeded as president.

Dethier was also politically active, serving on his local council and as mayor. In 1954, he was elected to the general council of the Belgian Socialist Party, and from 1954 to 1961 he served as a co-opted member of the Senate.

Trade union offices
Preceded by Heinrich Imig	President of the Miners' International Federation; 1956–1963	Succeeded by Heinrich Gutermuth
