= Union of Miners of Germany =

- Verband der Bergarbeiter Deutschlands
- Successor: Industrial Union of Mining (E Germany), Union of Mining and Energy (W Germany)
- Founded: 18 August 1889
- Dissolved: 2 May 1933
- Headquarters: Biemelhauserstraße 38/40, Bochum
- Location: Germany
- Members: 467,339 (1920)
- Publication: Bergarbeiter-Zeitung (to 1928); Die Bergbau-Industrie (from 1929)
- Affiliations: ADGB, MIF

The Union of Miners of Germany (German: Verband der Bergarbeiter Deutschlands, VdBD) was a trade union representing miners in Germany.

The union was founded in 1889 at a meeting at Dorstfeld, to represent miners in the Rheinland and Westphalia. The following year, it broadened its focus to recruit miners from across Germany, and frequently changed its name. In 1895, the Saxon Miners' Association dissolved, and many of its members joined the national union, which by the 1920s had fifteen regions, and was based in Bochum.

The union was a founding affiliate of the General German Trade Union Federation in 1919, and by the following year, it had 467,339 members. Membership fell rapidly over the following decade, and by 1931 was down to 164,118. In 1929, the union renamed itself as the Union of Industrial Mining Workers of Germany.

In 1933, the union was forcibly dissolved by the Nazis. After World War II, miners formed the new Union of Mining and Energy.

== Presidents ==
1889: Fritz Bunte
1895: Heinrich Möller
1902: Hermann Sachse
1919: Fritz Husemann
