= Hendrik Bollmann =

German politician (born 1982)

Member of the Bundestag
- Assuming office 25 March 2025
- Succeeding: Michelle Müntefering
- Constituency: Herne – Bochum II

Personal details
- Born: 10 September 1982 (age 43)
- Party: Social Democratic Party
- Parent: Gerd Bollmann (father)

Hendrik Bollmann (born 10 September 1982) is a German politician who was elected as a member of the Bundestag in 2025. He has served as chairman of the Social Democratic Party in Herne since 2022.
