= Dalglish =

Daglish, Dalglish, Dalgleish or Dalgliesh is a Scottish name originating from Gaelic dail (field) + glaise (brook). It may refer to:

== People ==
- Alice Dalgliesh (1893–1979), American children's author
- Andrew Dalgleish (diplomat) (born 1975), British diplomat
- Andrew Dalgleish (spy) (1853–1888)
- Angus Dalgleish (born 1950), British researcher
- Ben Daglish (1966–2018), British composer and musician
- Chris Douglas (musician) (born 1974), musician who uses the pseudonym Dalglish
- David Dalgleish (born 1962), Australian politician
- Dick Dalgleish (1880–1955), New Zealand cricketer
- Edward R. Dalglish (1909–2001), Biblical scholar and professor
- Eric Fitch Daglish (1892–1966), British artist and author
- Grant Dalgliesh (born 1975), American game designer
- Henry Daglish (1866–1920), sixth Premier of Western Australia
- Kelly Dalglish (born 1975), British television presenter
- Kenny Dalglish (born 1951), Scottish football player and manager
- Malcolm Dalglish (born 1952), American composer
- Murray Dalglish (born 1968), Scottish musician
- Nicol Dalgleish, Church of Scotland representative in 1591
- Paul Dalglish (born 1977), Scottish football player, son of Kenny
- Richard Dalgliesh (1844–1922), British industrialist and engineer
- Robert Dalglish (politician) (1808–1880), Member of the British Parliament
- Tom Dalgliesh (born 1945), owner of Columbia Games boardgame maker
- Walter Scott Dalgleish (1834–1897), British author

== Places ==
- Daglish, Western Australia, a suburb of Perth, Western Australia
- Daglish railway station, Perth, Western Australia

== Other uses ==
- Adam Dalgliesh, a character in novels by P. D. James
  - Dalgliesh (TV series), a British television series featuring the character
- Daglish Ministry, the 7th Ministry of the Government of Western Australia
- Dalgleish Report, a study on racial segregation
- Dalgliesh-Gullane, a British built car
