= Wismut =

Wismut is a German name for bismuth. It may also refer to:

- Wismut (company), an East German uranium mining company
- Wismut Industrial Union, a trade union
- BSG Wismut Gera, a football club in Gera, Thuringia
- BSG Wismut Aue, former name of football club FC Erzgebirge Aue
