= Roan Antelope copper mine =

Copper mine in Luanshya, Copperbelt, Zambia

Roan Antelope
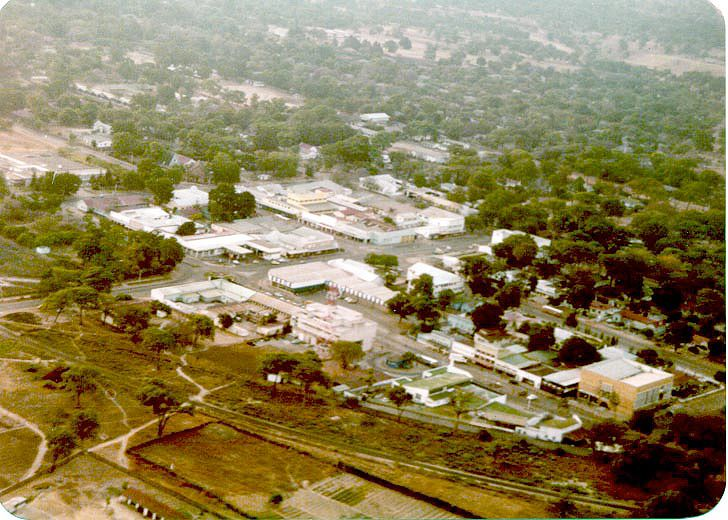
- Aerial photograph of the town centre of Luanshya, taken during the early 1990s.

- Location in Zambia
- Location: Luanshya District, Copperbelt Province, Zambia; 13.13333°S 28.4°E
- Products: Copper ore

Roan Antelope is a copper mine in Zambia. The deposits were discovered in 1902, but their full extent was not understood until 1926. The mine site was developed between 1927 and 1931, at first experiencing many deaths from malaria due to poor drainage. Production since then has experienced various slumps and booms. The mine was nationalized in 1970 and returned to private ownership in 1997. The new owners struggled to make it profitable, and it changed hands twice.

== Location ==
The Roan Antelope Copper Mine is in Luanshya District, Copperbelt Province, Zambia. The Köppen climate classification is Cwa : Monsoon-influenced humid subtropical climate. Before being drained, the mine location was a swampy area within a horseshoe bend of the Luanshya River. The Chamber of Mines Yearbook (1960) showed the Roan reserves as 3.04% copper, the poorest value in the Copperbelt. In 1967 the reserves were said to average 2.86% copper.

The mine's name is said to have been given by William Collier, a prospector and explorer, who shot and killed a roan antelope in 1902 beside the Luanshya River. When he went up to the animal he found its head was lying on a rock that contained a visible seam of copper ore. The next day he shot a rietbok nearby, and found another source of copper which became the Rietbok claim. On another expedition he found the Bwana Mkubwa claim after he shot a hippopotamus and found a copper bullet in its hide. He persuaded the local Africans to tell him where the copper had come from. These stories, given by A. Chester Beatty in a 1931 speech to the American Institute of Mining Engineers, may be taken for what they are worth.

== Exploration ==
The Rhodesia Copper Company worked the deposit between 1902 and 1907. They cut 15 trenches and four inclined shafts at Roan Antelope and another 5 trenches at the Rietbok concession. The surface ore was oxide ore, which is costly to refine. Development of Roan Antelope, Rietbok and Bwana Mkubwa was abandoned when better quality ore was discovered nearby in Katanga and the Union Minière du Haut Katanga (UMHK) began producing large volumes of copper at low prices.

There was renewed interest in Northern Rhodesian copper when prices rose in the 1920s. A. Chester Beatty, founder and owner of Selection Trust, obtained the option of taking over the Roan and Rietbok concessions until 31 March 1926. He engaged the engineer Russell J. Parker, who arrived in the area in September 1925, and inspected the former Rhodesia Copper Company workings. Parker realized that the early miners had not noticed that the quality of the ore increased with depth, and the mineralized shale bed became wider at lower levels.

Parker claimed the land between the Roan Antelope and Rietbok claims on behalf of the Bwana Mkuba Copper Mining Company, naming the new claims the "Luanshia" claims, from which the town of Luanshya takes its name. (Note: Luanshya comes from Lwa nsha, a Lamba term meaning "place of antelopes".) Parker sank two deeper center shafts, with additional cross-cuts, and his samples seemed to indicate a copper sulfide deposit. A further program of shaft sinking and drilling started around the end of April 1926 and showed there was a belt of sulfide ore about 36.5 feet (11.1 m) thick, with 3.87% copper at a depth of 500 feet (150 m). The sulphides would be much cheaper to refine than the oxides found elsewhere.

== Construction ==
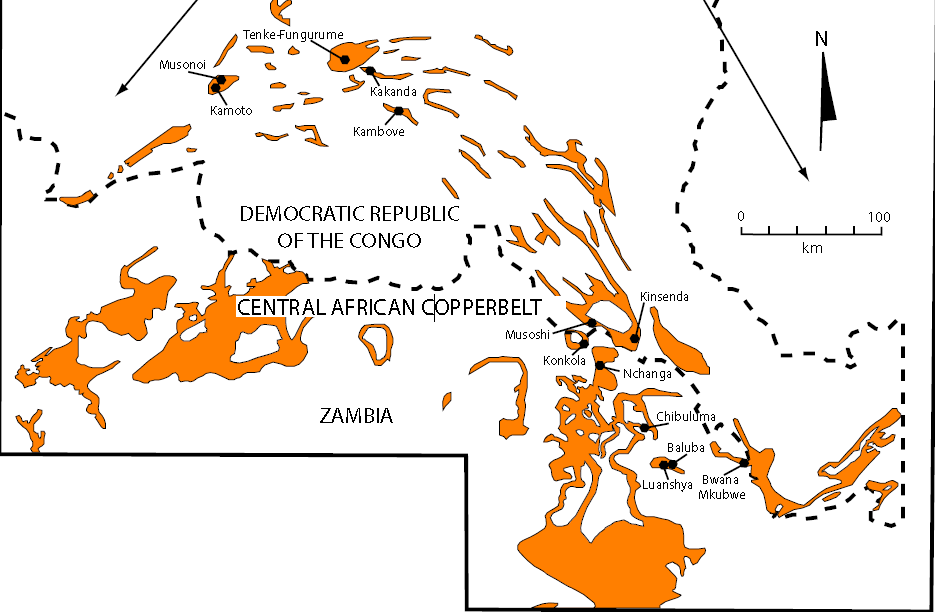
Central African Copper Belt. Luanshya in the southeast.

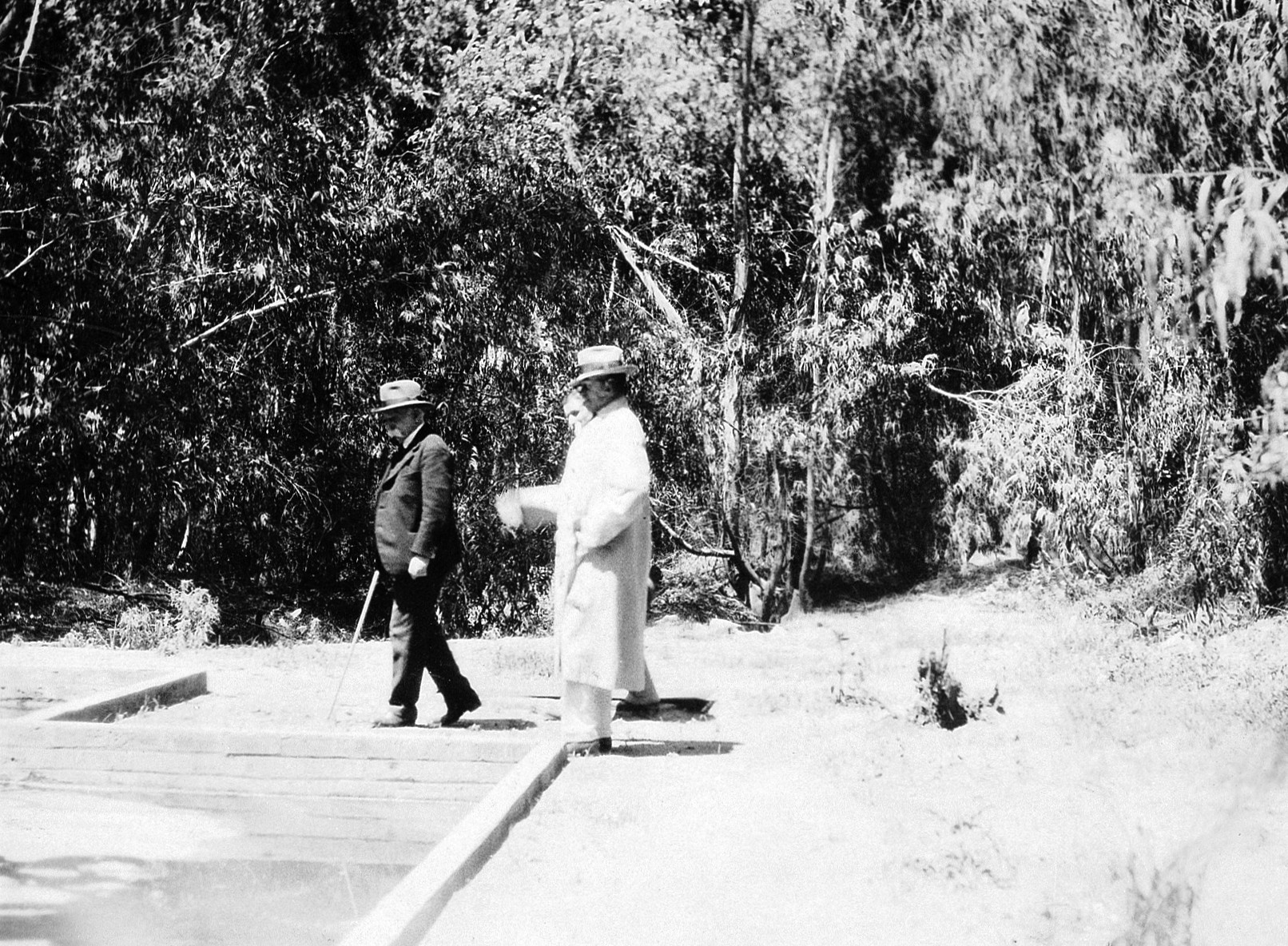
Sir William John Ritchie Simpson, Northern Rhodesia

Roan Antelope Copper Mines was incorporated under the British Corporations Act in 1927 by Selection Trust to develop the mine, a concentrator and a smelter. In 1927 there were 700 to 1,100 African workers. By 1929 there were about 4,000 African workers and 300 Europeans. Many of the Africans were migrants with experience in the mines of South Africa and Southern Rhodesia. The African laborers worked for an average of three months before leaving the site, which was very unhealthy.

The construction process created many places where pools of water could form, ideal places for malaria-carrying mosquitoes to breed. The mine experienced a high death rate between 1927 and 1930, making it hard to hire both African and European miners. The Europeans in South Africa heard of the high levels of malaria and blackwater fever, while the local Africans heard that the river and nearby land was home to a dangerous snake spirit. In 1928 a surveyor's assistant named Joseph Zgambo drowned in the Luanshya River. Word spread that the death was caused by a snake spirit living in the river. Recruitment came to a halt and many Africans left the project. In 1928 an exorcism ceremony was held to drive out the funkwe snake.

In 1929 the managers of the mining company in London arranged for the Ross Institute for Tropical Diseases to send an expedition led by William John Ritchie Simpson to find what was causing the deaths. (Note: The Ross Institute had been founded in 1926 to continue the environment-based approach to mosquito control developed by Ronald Ross. It primarily helped British businesses to resolve malaria problems.) Despite some objections to the cost of the work, a project was undertaken to drain the mine works and housing areas, and a zone .5 miles (0.80 km) around them, which was thought to be the farthest distance most mosquitoes could fly. The work included building culverts and road bridges, filling holes, draining marshes and making the channels of the Luanshya River and other streams deeper and straighter. At the same time latrines were built, garbage removed, the hospital was cleaned regularly and a laboratory was established. The result was a dramatic decline in deaths from 61.1 per 1,000 per month in the rainy season of 1929–1930 to 17.5 per 1,000 per month by 1931–1932.

The mining company did not wait for an official government survey, but started to build the planned town of Luanshya immediately. They opened five shops and started a hospital. Single African men were at first housed in mud brick rondavels with thatched roofs. After 1929 they were moved to baked brick houses with corrugated iron roofs and concrete floors, supposedly mosquito-proof, while the rondavels were assigned to African married couples. The company's compound manager and the black mine police had more authority than the government. In 1931 the manager set up a Tribal Elders Council to settle disputes according to customary law, which had the side effect of making the miners feel independent of European authority.

== Operations ==
Production began in 1931. The mine opened at the start of a copper slump. At the peak of the copper boom in 1930 the Northern Rhodesian mines employed 31,941 people. By the end of 1932 the workforce had dropped to 6,677. In late May 1935 a crowd of striking Bemba miners gathered outside the offices of the Roan Antelope copper mine. The police fired at random into the miners and their supporters. Six people were killed and 22 wounded. The governor, Hubert Winthrop Young formed a commission led by William Alison Russell to report on the reason for the disturbances. The conclusion was that it was due to a tax increase that had been announced to the miners abruptly and without explanation. The commission did not question the tax increase itself, but reformers asked what the Africans received in return for the tax.

Roan Antelope was not able to declare a dividend until 1935. Most profits were used to develop the mine, but in 1937 Roan Antelope was able to pay an 80% dividend, followed by 20% in 1938. The African Mineworkers' Trade Union (AMWU) was formed in 1949. The first serious strike was in 1952, with the union demanding wage hikes of 2s. 8d. per shift. It lasted 21 days, until management accepted arbitration, through which the workers gained solid increases in pay. The companies started a new policy of promoting Africans into low-level supervisory positions. These men had to leave the AMWU and join the Mines African Staff Association (MASA), whose members could not strike. There was a small strike at Roan in 1954. The company stopped rations, but the strikers were able to survive on food from their gardens.

The mine was reorganized under the Northern Rhodesia Company Ordinance on 1 July 1954. In 1955 and 1956 there were sustained strikes against the MASA members. The 1956 strike was ended in September when an emergency was declared and the radical union leaders were banished. In 1956 Roan Antelope paid dividends of 100%. In 1957 the Queen Elizabeth The Queen Mother visited the Roan Antelope Copper mine. She wore a white coat and a miner's helmet with lamp as she watched mining activity and shook hands with longtime miners. In 1960 production peaked at 105,000 tonnes of copper. There was a strike in 1961 for African wages closer to those of Europeans, which ended only when the African nationalist leaders put pressure on the unions. By 1964, when Zambia gained independence, Luanshya had a population of 62,000. In 1966 there was another major strike protesting the dual wage structure set up at independence.

The copper industry in Zambia was nationalized in 1970, and in 1982 Roan Antelope became part of Zambia Consolidated Copper Mines. It was privatized in 1997 and became the property of the Roan Antelope Mining Corporation of Zambia, owned by a group based in India. This company went bankrupt in late 2000. The mine was flooded in 2001 when heavy rains caused the Luanshya dam to overflow, and was officially closed. The mine was sold to a Swiss/Israeli joint venture in 2002, but this failed in 2008 and the mine's 2,500 workers were laid off. In 2009 the China Nonferrous Metal Mining Group acquired the mine, and reopened it in 2010, but faced strong competition within Zambia and globally. In 2015 the government proposed a steep increase in mineral taxes, leading to a stand-off with the mining companies and the loss of more than 10,000 mining jobs in Zambia.

== Sources ==
- Coleman, Francis L. (1971), The Northern Rhodesia Copperbelt, 1899-1962: Technological Development Up to the End of the Central African Federation, Manchester University Press, ISBN 978-0-7190-0419-3
- Filitz, John (25 April 2016), "Copper proves a rocky road for Zambia", Global Risk Insights
- Harrop, Keith, Roan Antelope Copper Mines Ltd
- Messac, Luke Michael (2016), "Dividends Of Disquiet: Popular Politics And Economic Thought In The History Of Government Medical Services In Nyasaland/malawi, 1914-1983", Publicly Accessible Penn Dissertations (Publicly Accessible Penn Dissertations. 2471), archived from the original on June 8, 2020
- "Original Names Of Zambian Towns", Zambian Observer, 17 May 2018
- Parpart, Jane L. (1983), "The Copper Industry in the Colonial Period", Labor and Capital on the African Copperbelt, Temple University Press, pp. 13–28, doi:10.2307/j.ctv6mtdm4.8, JSTOR j.ctv6mtdm4.8
- Parpart, Jane L. (October 1986), "The Household and the Mine Shaft: Gender and Class Struggles on the Zambian Copperbelt, 1926-64", Journal of Southern African Studies, 13 (1), Taylor & Francis: 36–56, doi:10.1080/03057078608708131, JSTOR 2636675
- "Roan Antelope Copper Mine, Copperbelt Province, Zambia", Mindat.org
- Schumaker, Lyn (December 2008), "Slimes and Death-Dealing Dambos: Water, Industry and the Garden City on Zambia's Copperbelt", Journal of Southern African Studies, 34 (4, The Power of Water: Landscape, Water and the State in Southern and Eastern Africa), Taylor & Francis, Ltd.: 823–840, doi:10.1080/03057070802456771, JSTOR 40283195, S2CID 144624604
- Siegel, Brian (December 1988), "Bomas, Missions and Mines: The Making of Centers on the Zambian Copperbelt", African Studies Review, 31 (3): 36–55, doi:10.2307/524073, JSTOR 524073, S2CID 146661949 – via Furman University
- Zambia / Royal: Queen Mother Visits Roan Antelope Copper Mine In Former Northern Rhodesia 1957, Reuters - Gaumont British Newsreel, 18 July 1957
