= National Union of Mineworkers =

National Union of Mineworkers may refer to:

- National Union of Mineworkers (Great Britain)
- National Union of Mineworkers (South Africa)

== See also ==
- Mine Workers' Union (disambiguation)
