= Heinrich Gutermuth =

German trade union leader

Heinrich Gutermuth (18 June 1898 – 28 June 1977) was a German trade union leader.

Born in Ilbeshausen (near Grebenhain), Gutermuth completed an apprenticeship as a blacksmith, then served in World War I. After the war, he found work as a mechanic at a coal mine in Recklinghausen. He joined the Union of Christian Miners, and from 1926 worked full-time as a union official.

The union was dissolved by the Nazis in 1933, and Gutermuth found himself unemployed, but obtained work at the Bielefelder linen factory. He was conscripted in 1939, and late in World War II was captured by Soviet troops.

After the war, Gutermuth was a founder member of IG Bergbau, a new miners' union, working as its secretary until 1953. He was then elected as the union's president, but renounced the position in favour of Heinrich Imig. He instead served as vice-president of the union, finally becoming president in 1964. Under his leadership, the union began representing other energy workers, and changed its name to "IG Bergbau und Energie". In 1963, he was elected as president of the Miners' International Federation (MIF). He retired from domestic trade unionism in 1964, but remained active with the MIF for a few more years.

Gutermuth was awarded the Great Cross of the Order of Merit of the Federal Republic of Germany.

Trade union offices
Preceded by Heinrich Imig	President of IG Bergbau; 1956–1964	Succeeded by Walter Arendt
Preceded by Nicolas Dethier	President of the Miners' International Federation; 1963–1967	Succeeded by Walter Arendt
