= William John Ritchie Simpson =

Scottish physician and specialist in tropical medicine

Sir William John Ritchie Simpson CMG
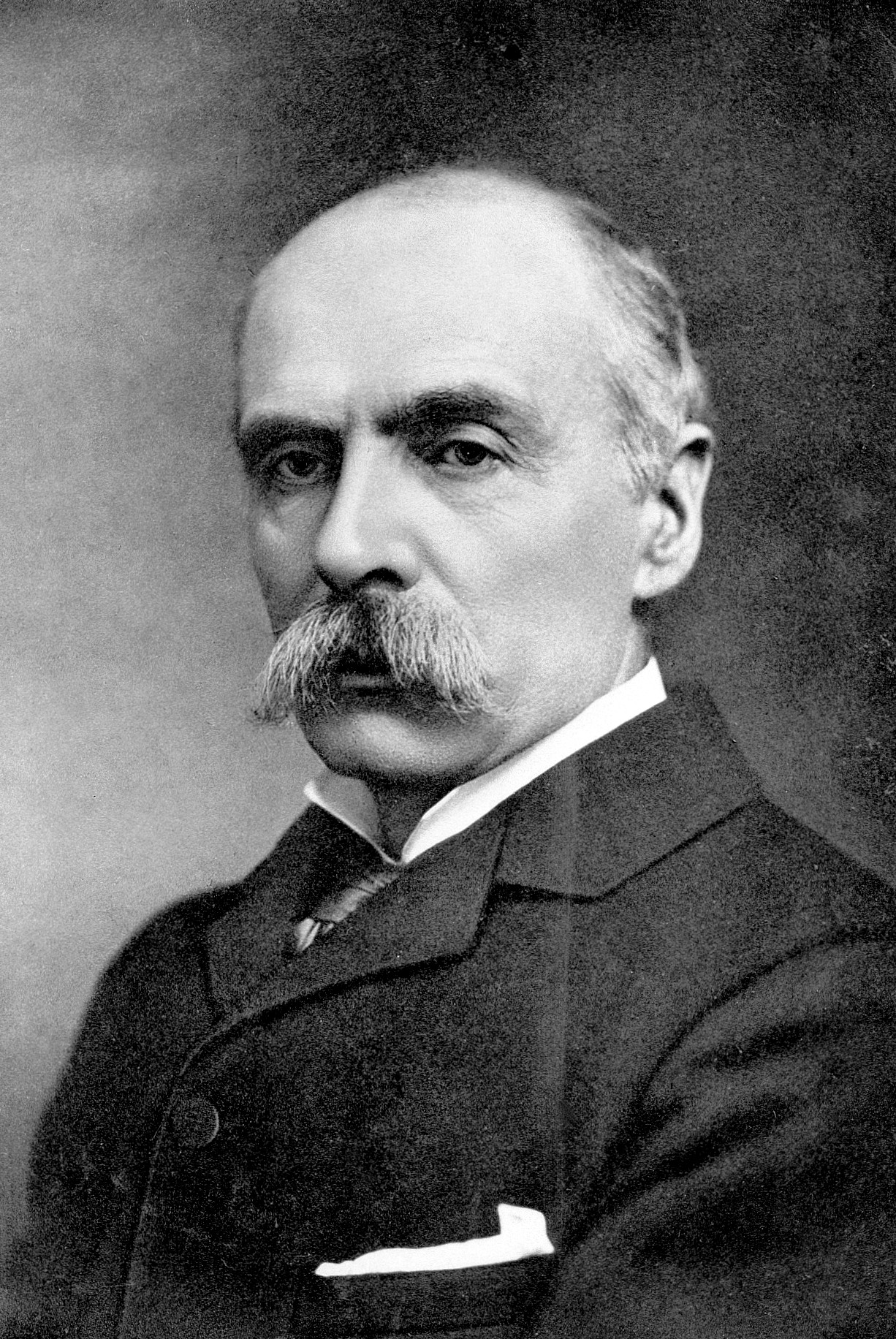
- Born: 27 April 1855; Glasgow, Scotland
- Died: 20 September 1931 (aged 76); London, England
- Occupation: Physician
- Known for: Tropical medicine

Sir William John Ritchie Simpson CMG (27 April 1855 – 20 September 1931) was a Scottish physician and specialist in tropical medicine.

== Early years ==
William John Ritchie Simpson was born in Glasgow, Scotland, the son of John Simpson. He attended school in Jersey. He was admitted to the University of Aberdeen, and graduated in 1876 as Bachelor of Medicine, Master of Surgery. He seems to have been a medical assistant in a Huddersfield practice, and around 1878 worked at the Haydock Lodge Retreat. (Note: The Haydock Lodge Asylum was a private asylum for the restoration and cure of the insane in Haydock near St Helens, Merseyside.) Simpson moved to Kent, where he was Medical Officer for a district of the Dover poor law union and a public vaccinator. Simpson also worked the Samaritan Convalescent Home in Dover. In 1800 he obtained his M.D. from Aberdeen and obtained a certificate in Sanitary Science (later Doctor of Public Health) from Cambridge.

== Physician and health officer ==
In 1880 Simpson was appointed medical officer of health for Aberdeen. In 1886 he resigned from this position so he could study at King's College London. From there he went to Kolkata, India, to become the first medical officer of health for that city. In this position, which he held until 1897, he gained experience in tropical diseases. In 1888 he married Isabella Mary Jane Jamieson. She was the daughter of George Jamieson, the minister of St Machar's Cathedral, Aberdeen. They had one son and one daughter.

== Expert in tropical medicine ==
Simpson returned to London and in 1898 became professor of hygiene and lecturer in tropical medicine at King's College. In 1899 he helped found the London School of Tropical Medicine, where he was a lecturer until 1923. For several years he also gave lectures on hygiene at the London School of Medicine for Women. Simpson became a fellow of the Society of Tropical Medicine and Hygiene in 1909. He was on the society's council from 1911 to 1917, vice-president from 1917 to 1919 and president from 1919 to 1921. He managed to have the society made a royal society.

In 1926 Simpson helped found the Ross Institute in Putney, London. The institute continued the environment-based approach to mosquito control developed by Ronald Ross. It primarily helped British businesses to resolve malaria problems. Simpson left King's College in 1927. He was the director of the Ross Institute and a physician to the associated Hospital for Tropical Diseases until his death in 1931.

== Miscellaneous appointments ==
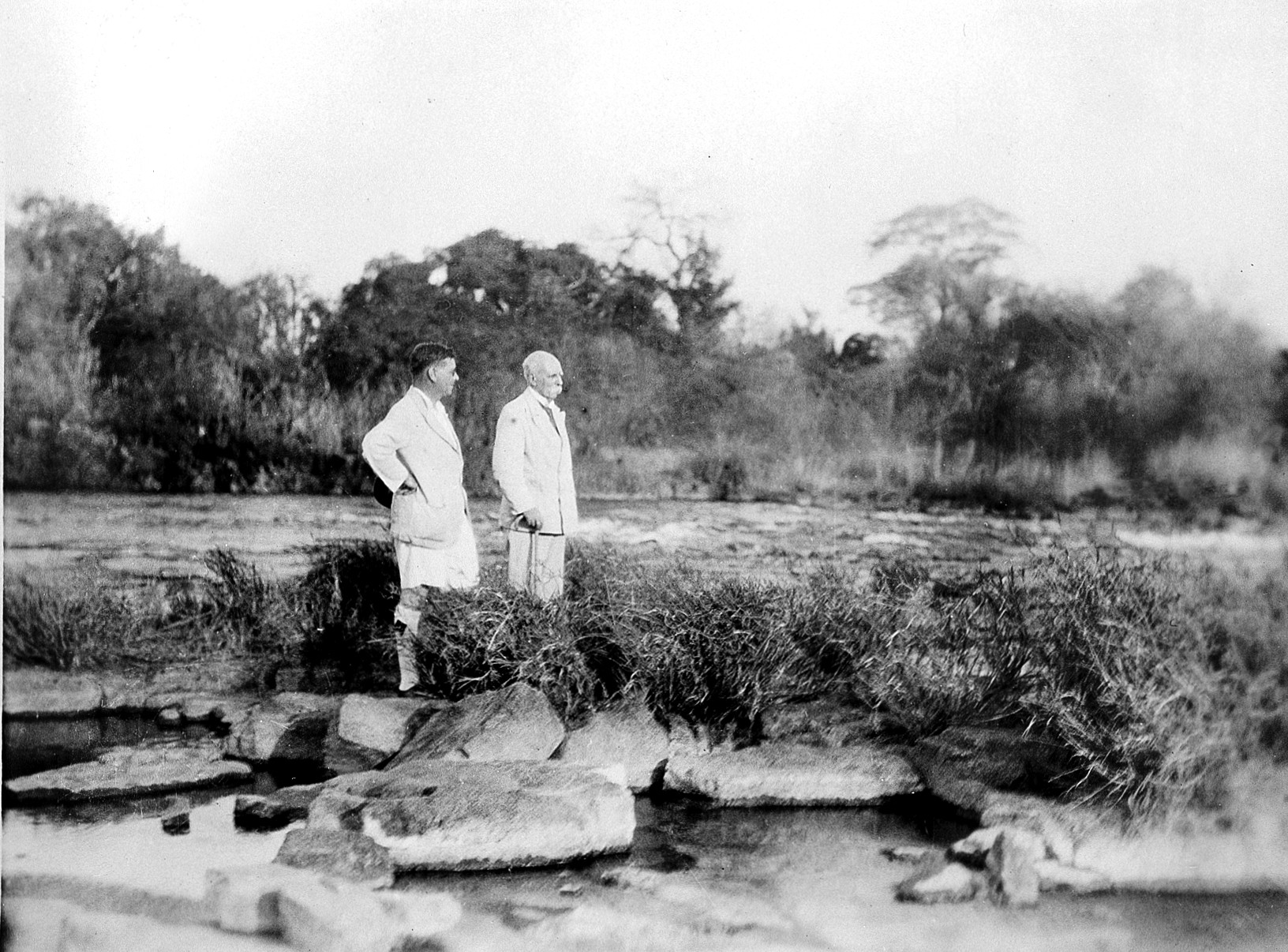
Sir William John Ritchie Simpson, Northern Rhodesia

Simpson was a member of the Naval Medical Consultative Board, the Colonial Medical and Sanitary Committee, the Yellow Fever Commission in West Africa and the Government Commission on Enteric Fever in South Africa from 1900 to 1901 during the Second Boer War. He investigated plague in Hong Kong in 1902, sanitation in Singapore in 1906 and plague and public health in West Africa in 1908. In 1913 he investigated plague and public health in East Africa, and was also a member of the commission on plague in West Africa. In 1924 he wrote a report on sanitation and plague in the mining districts of the Gold Coast. The Roan Antelope Copper Mine in Northern Rhodesia (now Zambia) experienced a high death rate during construction between 1927 and 1930. In 1929 the managers of the mining company in London arranged for the Ross Institute for Tropical Diseases to send an expedition led by Simpson to find what was causing the deaths.

== Death ==
Simpson died of pneumonia on 20 September 1931 at the Ross Institute. His biographer writes that "Simpson was a man of great industry and an inflexible purpose that sometimes led to clashes with his associates." Simpson sometimes ignored local knowledge and cultural concerns, and created resistance to his sanitary reforms through his insensitivity. He considered that the origins of plague or cholera bacilli were the bodies and homes of poor colonial workers. His solution was often to destroy large parts of colonial cities and to rebuild them according to current theories of sanitation. The poor were often forced to relocate. Whilst considered novel at the time, Simpson recommended he need for residential racial segregation between European, Asiatic and African races, notably in his 1915 report regarding conditions in Nairobi.

== Publications ==
- W. J. Simpson (1885), Dr. Simpson's report to the Local Government Board on the prevalence of diphtheria in the urban and rural sanitary districts of Shaftesbury
- W. J. Simpson (1885), Dr. Simpson's report to the Local Government Board on the prevalence of diphtheria in the urban and rural sanitary districts of Wellington, Somerset
- W. J. Simpson (1894), Cholera in Calcutta in 1894 and anti-choleraic inoculation
- W. J. Simpson (1903), Report on the causes and continuance of plague in Hongkong and suggestions as to remedial measures
- W. J. Simpson (1905), The maintenance of health in the tropics
- W. J. Simpson (1905), A treatise on plague dealing with the historical, epidemiological, clinical, therapeutic and preventive aspects of the disease
- W. J. Simpson (1908), Report on plague in the Gold Coast in 1908 by W. J Simpson
- W. J. Simpson (1908), The principles of hygiene as applied to tropical and sub-tropical climates, and the principles of personal hygiene in them as applied to Europeans

== Honors ==
- Croonian Lecturer at the Royal College of Physicians in 1907.
- Companion of the Order of St Michael and St George (C.M.G.) in 1909 for services on various missions in connection with plague and the promotion of public health in the Colonies
- Serbian Order of St. Sava in 1919 for services to Serbia during the War.
- Knight Bachelor in the 1923 Birthday Honours as a member of the Colonial Advisory Medical and Sanitary Committee

== Sources ==
- Baker, R A; Bayliss, R A (October 1987), "William John Ritchie Simpson (1855–1931): Public health and tropical medicine", Medical History, 31 (4): 450–465, doi:10.1017/S0025727300047293, PMC 1139786, PMID 3316879, S2CID 27886139
- Brown, G.H., Sir William John Ritchie Simpson, Royal College of Physicians
- "Haydock Lodge Asylum, Haydock", The National Archives
- Low, G. Carmichael (3 October 1931), "Obituary; Sir William John Ritchie Simpson, C.M.G. M.D. F.R.C.P.", Br Med J, 2 (3691): 633, doi:10.1136/bmj.2.3691.633, PMC 2315016, PMID 20776426
- Schumaker, Lyn (December 2008), "Slimes and Death-Dealing Dambos: Water, Industry and the Garden City on Zambia's Copperbelt", Journal of Southern African Studies, 34 (4, The Power of Water: Landscape, Water and the State in Southern and Eastern Africa), Taylor & Francis, Ltd.: 823–840, doi:10.1080/03057070802456771, JSTOR 40283195, S2CID 144624604
