= Adolf Schmidt =

German politician

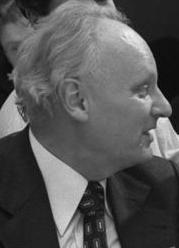
Schmidt in 1978

Adolf Schmidt (18 April 1925 – 26 November 2013) was a German trade union leader and politician.

== Biography ==
Born in Holzhausen, Homberg, Schmidt became a mechanic at a coal mine, then in 1942 was drafted into the navy as a submarine mechanic. He was taken as a prisoner of war and released at the end of the war, returning to the pit. In 1947, he joined the Union of Mining and Energy (IG BE), and immediately won election to the works council at the mine. In 1949, he joined the Social Democratic Party of Germany (SPD), and the following year he studied in Frankfurt.

In 1951, Schmidt began working full-time for IG BE, as its Munich youth secretary, then he successively ran the union's offices in Breisgau and Gießen, before in 1965 he became head of the union's Hesse-Rhineland-Palatinate district, and also won election to its executive.

In 1969, Schmidt was elected as the president of IG BE, on a platform of improving working conditions in coal mines, and preserving jobs in coal mining and at nuclear power stations. In 1971, he was additionally elected as president of the Miners' International Federation, and in 1972 he was elected as an SPD member of the Bundestag.

Schmidt stood down from his international post in 1984, as president of the IG BE in 1985, and from the Bundestag in 1987.

Trade union offices
Preceded by Walter Arendt	President of the Union of Mining and Energy; 1969–1985	Succeeded by Heinz-Werner Meyer
Preceded by ?	President of the Miners' International Federation; 1971–1984	Succeeded by Anders Stendalen
