= Dalgleish Report =

The Dalgleish Report was a governmental report produced by the Dalgleish Commission, a commission of inquiry established in 1947 to investigate industrial relations in the mining industry of Northern Rhodesia. In particular the Commission suggested possible reforms to the industrial colour bar, a system of segregation which reserved certain occupations for European mineworkers.

== History ==
It was decided to establish a commission of inquiry into the position of African mineworkers in Northern Rhodesia at a Colonial Office conference held in June 1946, attended by members of the Legislative Council. Such an inquiry was one of the recommendations of the previous Forster Commission, which investigated the violence following the 1940 Northern Rhodesian African Mineworkers' Strike. The Commission was to be chaired by Andrew Dalgleish, a British trade unionist, who had also sat on the Forster Commission. Two other independent commissioners were appointed: James Kelly, of the British National Union of Mineworkers, and H. O. Smith, a Director of Imperial Chemical Industries.

In 1952, Lawrence Katilunga of the African Mineworkers' Union explained the link between the conclusions of the Dalgleish Report and his union's negotiating stand: "The Dalgleish Report is still on the shelf and we want it taken down and implemented. Until that happens, we are going to press for more and more pay increases. In the end the companies will be compelled to let Africans operate more machines and do more skilled work. Otherwise they will simply have to pay us high wages for low-skilled work. It's up to them."
