= Bolman (disambiguation) =

Bolman is a settlement in the region of Baranja, Croatia.

Bolman may also refer to:

- Bolmån, a river in Sweden
- John Bolman (1751–1833), physician, surgeon, and political figure in Nova Scotia
- Marloes Bolman (born 1977), Dutch rower

== See also ==
- Bollman, surname
