= Pierre Vigne (trade unionist) =

French trade unionist (1885–1960s)

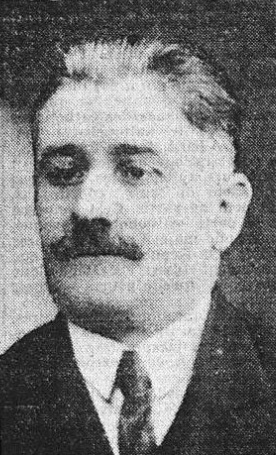
Pierre Vigne in 1936

Pierre Ferdinand Joseph Vigne (20 April 1885, Concoules – 1960s) was a French trade union leader, who came to international prominence, but collaborated with the Vichy government and fell into obscurity.

Vigne worked as a miner, and during World War I was the secretary of the local miners' union in La Grand-Combe. In 1918, he was elected as secretary of the Gard Miners' Federation, which was affiliated to the National Federation of Miners (FNTSS) and, through that, the General Confederation of Labour (CGT). In 1920, he was a delegate to the Miners' International Federation (MIF) conference, held in Geneva.

The CGT suffered a major split in 1921, with communists leaving to form the United General Confederation of Labour (CGTU). Vigne remained loyal to the federation, and an outspoken critic of the CGTU. As a result, in 1924, he was elected as president of the FNTSS. He also served on the national committee of the CGT with special responsibility for foreign workers in France. As a result, he started Prawo Ludu, a newspaper for Polish miners.

In 1934, Vigne was elected as president of the MIF. In 1936, he was appointed to the National Economic Council. He was unhappy with the CGTU rejoining the CGT, and worked with René Belin to oppose its former leaders gaining prominent positions in the merged union. He denounced the Molotov–Ribbentrop Pact, and at the start of World War II argued that the unions should be permitted to operate as they had been.

In November 1940, the old unions were dissolved, and new, legal ones were established. The following year, Vigne was appointed to the Vichy National Council. He became part of the Trade Unionist Propaganda Circle, along with Georges Dumoulin, René Mesnard and Ludovic Zoretti, with responsibility for union relations, and arguing that the legal unions should be permitted to operate more freely. He joined the National Popular Rally party.

On the Liberation of France, Vigne was barred from all trade union positions for life. He fell into obscurity and died in the 1960s.

Trade union offices
Preceded by Casimir Bartuel	President of the National Federation of Miners; 1924–1940	Succeeded by Victorin Duguet
Preceded by Fritz Husemann	President of the Miners' International Federation; 1934–1940	Succeeded by Achille Delattre
