= Michelle Müntefering =

German journalist and politician

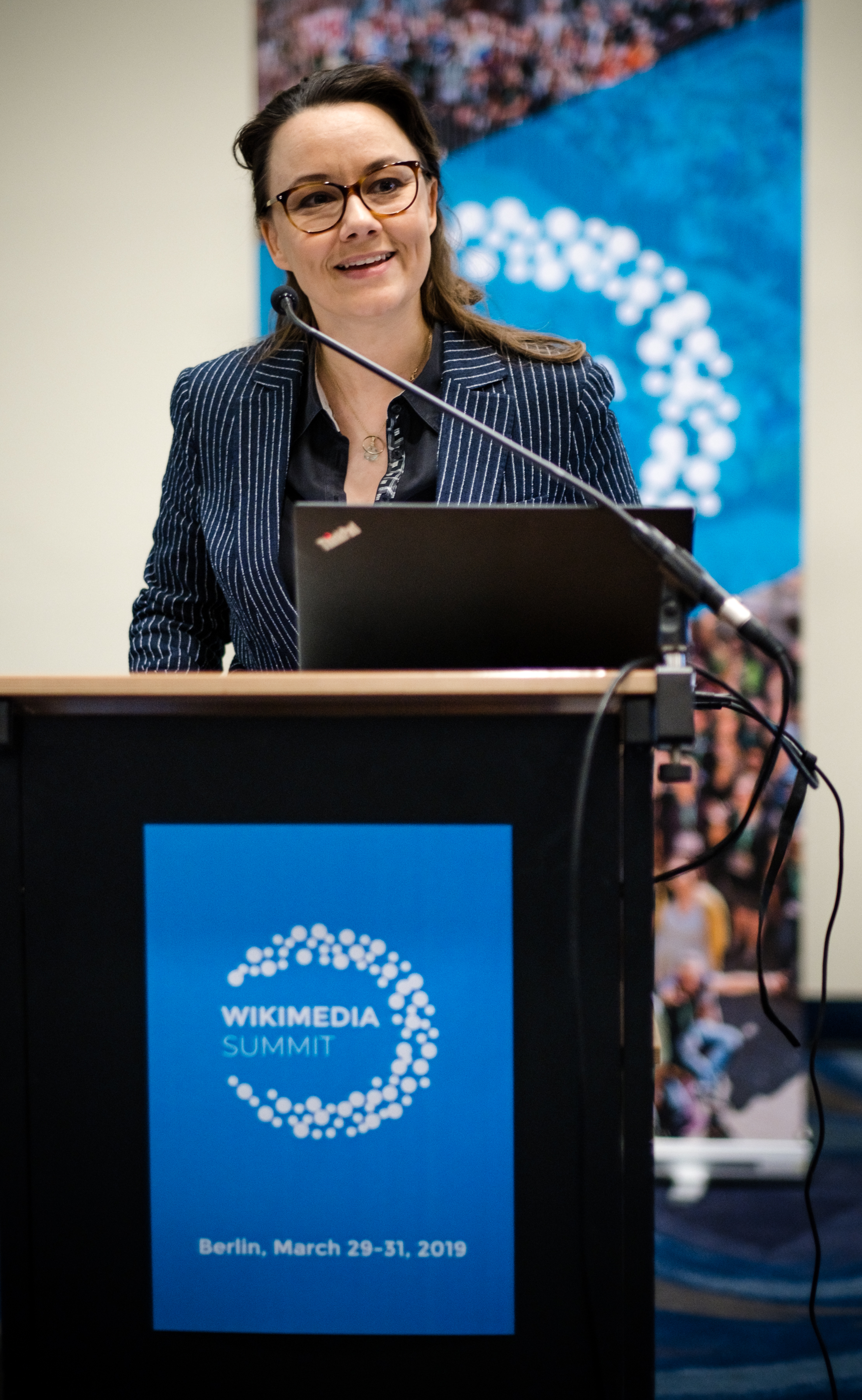
- Müntefering in 2019

Minister of State for International Cultural Policy
- In office 14 March 2018 – 8 December 2021
- Chancellor: Angela Merkel
- Preceded by: Office established
- Succeeded by: Katja Keul

Member of the Bundestag for Herne – Bochum II
- In office 22 October 2013 – 2025
- Preceded by: Gerd Bollmann

Personal details
- Born: Michelle-Jasmin Gabriele Schumann; 9 April 1980 (age 46) Herne, North Rhine-Westphalia, West Germany (now Germany)
- Citizenship: German
- Party: SPD

Michelle-Jasmin Gabriele Müntefering (née Schumann; born 9 April 1980) is a German journalist and politician of the Social Democratic Party (SPD) who has been serving as a member of the German Bundestag since the 2013, representing the Herne – Bochum II district.

Müntefering was a member of the party executive board in North Rhine-Westphalia from 2004 to 2014. In addition to her parliamentary mandate, she served as Minister of State (Parliamentary State Secretary) at the Federal Foreign Office under minister Heiko Maas in the fourth government of Chancellor Angela Merkel from 2018 until 2021.

== Education and early career ==
Müntefering was born in Herne. During her schooldays at the Hibernia School, she completed a vocational training from 1997 to 1998 as a nanny, which belonged to the concept of the school. After her graduation in 2000, she did an internship in a local editorial office and then joined a news and press agency.

From 2002 to 2007 Müntefering studied journalism with a focus on economics, graduated with a bachelor's degree and initially worked freelance in the media. In 2008 and 2009 she was a research associate to Franz Müntefering at the German Bundestag. From 2008 to 2010 she did a traineeship at Vorwärts in Berlin. From 2010 Müntefering worked as a freelance journalist.

== Political career ==
Müntefering has been a member of the German Bundestag since the 2013 federal elections. In her first term, she was a member of the Committee on Foreign Affairs as well as on its Sub-Committee on Cultural Relations and Education Policy. On the Committee on Foreign Affairs, she served as her parliamentary group’s rapporteur on relations to Turkey. From 2014 until 2015, she briefly served as rapporteur for digital consumer protection.

In addition to her committee assignments, Müntefering served as chairwoman of the German-Turkish Parliamentary Friendship Group from 2014 until 2018. She is also a member of the German-Israeli Parliamentary Friendship Group and of the German-Iranian Parliamentary Friendship Group.

In the negotiations to form a coalition government under the leadership of Chancellor Angela Merkel following the 2017 federal elections, Müntefering was part of the working group on foreign policy, led by Ursula von der Leyen, Gerd Müller and Sigmar Gabriel. Between February and March 2018, she briefly served as member of the SPD parliamentary group’s leadership under chairwoman Andrea Nahles.

After leaving government, Müntefering joined the Committee on Foreign Affairs and became the chairwoman of its Subcommittee on Foreign Cultural and Educational Policy. In 2023, she was one of the initiators – alongside Agnieszka Brugger and Marie-Agnes Strack-Zimmermann – of a cross-party group promoting a feminist foreign policy.

In April 2023, Müntefering announced her intention to resign from the German Parliament and instead run in the 2024 European elections; however, she failed to get her party's nomination. In June 2024, she announced that she would not stand in the 2025 federal elections but instead resign from active politics by the end of the parliamentary term.

== Other activities ==
=== Regulatory bodies ===
- Federal Network Agency for Electricity, Gas, Telecommunications, Post and Railway (BNetzA), Alternate Member of the Advisory Board (2013–2018)
- Landesanstalt für Medien Nordrhein-Westfalen (LfM), Member of the Media Committee (−2015)

=== Corporate boards ===
- Humboldt Forum, Ex-Officio Member of the Supervisory Board (since 2018)
- Evangelische Verbund Ruhr (EVR), Member of the Supervisory Board

=== Non-profit organizations ===
- Tarabya Cultural Academy, Member of the Advisory Board (since 2022)
- German Federal Film Board (FFA), Member of the Supervisory Board (since 2022)
- Leibniz Association, Ex-Officio Member of the Senate (since 2018)
- Centre for Feminist Foreign Policy (CFFP), Member of the Advisory Council (since 2018)
- Friedrich Ebert Foundation (FES), Member of the Board of Trustees
- American Jewish Committee in Berlin, Member of the Advisory Board
- Berliner Republik, Member of the Board of Editors
- European Council on Foreign Relations (ECFR), Member
- Friends of the Herne Synagogue, Member
- Gegen Vergessen – Für Demokratie, Member
- German Orient Foundation, President of the Board of Trustees
- German-Turkish Society (DTG), Vice President
- German-Arab Friendship Association (DAFG), Member of the Board
- Progressives Zentrum, Member of the Circle of Friends
- Amnesty International, Member
- Atlantik-Brücke, Member
- German-Israeli Association (DIG), Member
- IG Bergbau, Chemie, Energie (IG BCE), Member
- Social Association of Germany (SoVD), Member
- 2015 German Short Film Awards, Member of the Jury
- Stiftung Datenschutz, Member of the Advisory Board (2014–2016)

== Controversy ==
In 2017, when media reports revealed Turkey’s intelligence agency MIT had illegally been spying on Germans suspected of ties to Fethullah Gulen, Müntefering was found to be one of the subjects of surveillance. In the weeks leading up to the 2017 federal elections, Müntefering’s car was set on fire with a Molotov cocktail.

== Personal life ==
In December 2009, she married the then Bundestag member, former SPD chairman and former vice-chancellor Franz Müntefering. The ceremony took place at the Zollverein Coal Mine Industrial Complex. The couple lives in Herne and Berlin’s Kreuzberg district.
