= Frank Hodges (trade unionist) =

English trade union leader

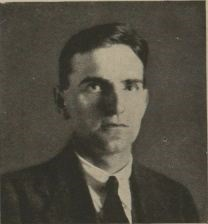
- Born: 30 April 1887; Woolaston, England
- Died: 3 June 1947 (aged 60)
- Occupations: miner, trade unionist, Member of Parliament, board member
- Known for: Leading the mining union of Great Britain through the inter-war period.
- Political party: Labour

Frank Hodges (30 April 1887 – 3 June 1947) was an English trade union leader, who became General Secretary of the Miners' Federation of Great Britain. A Member of Parliament (MP) for one year, he was Civil Lord of the Admiralty in the first Labour Government.

== Early life ==
Hodges was born in Woolaston in Gloucestershire in 1887, the son of Thomas and Louisa Hodges. The family moved to south Wales and at a young age Frank attended the Queen Street school in Abertillery.

At the age of 14 Hodges was working at the Powell Tillery Pit in Abertillery, and due to his desire to read, he came to the attention of one of the mining officials, who sponsored him to attend night school. At the age of sixteen, inspired by the preacher Evan Roberts, he became a Methodist and was soon preaching in the evenings. Like many trade unionists before him, he found his religious beliefs tied into the plight of the coal-miners, and joined the Trade Union movement. At the same time his political views led him to become a member of the Independent Labour Party.

At the age of eighteen, Hodges heard Philip Snowden addressing a crowd. He found Snowden inspirational and from that moment he saw the politician as his 'ideal'. Hodges was also shaped by the views of the Welsh syndicalist Noah Ablett, whose Plebs' League he later joined. Through his trade union links, Hodges secured a scholarship to Ruskin College, Oxford, and spent two years there from 1909. Although many of the students from Ruskin were not treated with the same equality as those at other Oxford colleges, Hodges found the life away from the coal mines to be to his liking, describing it as the great time of his life. In 1911, after the end of his studies, Hodges spent a brief time in Paris, where he stayed with the Marxist Paul Lafargue and his wife Laura Marx, only a few months before their joint suicide. Frank Hodges married Henrietta Carter at King Street Baptist Church, Abertillery, on 7 July 1911.

== Political and union career ==
After leaving Oxford, Hodges returned to work in the mines. After his time at Oxford he found the manual work as a hewer unbearable and attempted to find more intellectual work. He answered an advertisement for a job as a trade union agent, and was accepted as the Garw district representative of the South Wales Miners' Federation. Now twenty four, Hodges was in a career where he felt he could change the lives of others for the better, and started reforming his district's organisation. His work as a union agent was rewarded when in 1919 he became the Permanent Secretary of the Miners' Federation of Great Britain. In this role he negotiated terms and conditions for the mining industry with the Government which included meetings with Lloyd George.

In 1921, The South Wales Miners' Federation called for strike action after the coalowners demanded a reduction in wages from the miners. The miners rejected the terms and were locked out. The Miners' Federation called upon the aid of the Triple Alliance and a strike was called for 12 April. While preparations were taking place for the strike, the leaders of the Triple Alliance pushed the strike back to 15 April; in the interim, Hodges approached MPs independently in the hope of securing a temporary solution. When asked by the MPs if the miners would accept a wage that would not fall below the cost of living, Hodges stated that "any such offer...would receive very serious consideration". This action was seen as an act of betrayal by the miners' executive and Hodges lost the support of his own union. The Alliance fell apart and many unions withdrew their support, leaving the workers in an impossible situation as solidarity broke down; the event became known as 'Black Friday'.

In 1923, Hodges ran for political office, as Member of Parliament for Lichfield as a Labour candidate. He won the seat becoming part of the first Labour Government, under the leadership of Ramsay MacDonald and was given the office of First Lord of the Admiralty. It was during his period as a Member of Parliament that Hodges was invited to the Rhondda to play at Ton Pentre golf club in a game with the Duke of York before he became King George VI.

Once Hodges was a government minister, and seen as increasingly moderate, the Miners' Federation prepared to replace him as Secretary. Hodges resigned before he was pushed out: he was replaced by the radical Arthur Cook from the Rhondda district. The following year Hodges left his political post, and in 1926 he was appointed a member of the Central Electricity Board.

== Written works ==
- Nationalisation of the mines (1920) pub. Leonard Parsons, London (available online at openlibarary.org)
- My adventures as a labour leader (1924) pub. G Newnes

== Sources ==
- Williams, Chris (1998). "The Odyssey of Frank Hodges" (PDF). Transactions of the Honourable Society of Cymmrodorion. 5: 110–30.

Trade union offices
Preceded by John Thomas	Agent of the Garw District of the South Wales Miners' Federation; 1912 – 1919	Succeeded by Ted Williams
Preceded by William Latham and Tom Shaw	Auditor of the Trades Union Congress; 1917; With: Henry Boothman	Succeeded by A. B. Hall and Charles Hobson
Preceded by Thomas Ashton	General Secretary of the Miners' Federation of Great Britain; 1919–1924	Succeeded by A. J. Cook
Preceded by Thomas Ashton	Secretary of the Miners' International Federation; 1921–1927	Succeeded by Achille Delattre
Parliament of the United Kingdom
Preceded by Sir Courtenay Warner, 1st Baronet	Member of Parliament for Lichfield; 1923–1924	Succeeded by Roderick Roy Wilson
