= Industrial Union of Mining and Energy =

Former East German trade union (1963–1990)

The Industrial Union of Mining and Energy (German: Industriegewerkschaft Bergbau und Energie, IG Bergbau-Energie) was a trade union representing the mining, energy and water industries in East Germany.

The union was founded in 1946 as the Industrial Union of Mining, a section of the new Free German Trade Union Federation (FDGB). While most of the union was divided into districts based on location, a separate district was created for workers at Wismut, the uranium mining company, and in 1950 this was split away to form the Wismut Industrial Union.

In 1951, the FDGB created the Industrial Union of Metallurgy, to which ore miners were transferred, but the union was dissolved in 1951 and the ore miners returned to the mining union. In 1963, the Industrial Union of Energy, Post and Transport was dissolved, and energy workers were transferred to the mining union, which was renamed as the "Industrial Union of Mining and Energy". By 1964, the union had 375,000 members.)

Internationally, the union was affiliated to the Trade Union International of Miners. The union was also involved in sports associations, their names starting with "SV Aktivist".

The union's membership continued to grow, and by 1989, it had 472,039 members, with about 325,000 in mining, 87,000 in energy, and 38,000 in water. In April 1990, it became independent, and renamed itself as the Industrial Union of Mining, Energy and Water Management. It suspended its affiliation to the FDGB in May, and in October it dissolved, most of its members transferring to the West German Union of Mining and Energy, although those in water instead joined the Public Services, Transport and Traffic Union.

== Presidents ==
1946: Paul Lähne
1949: Max Fritsch
1951: Karl Honisch
1954: Fritz Leiter
1955: Werner Lucas
1977: Erhard Ullrich
1982: Günter Wolf
1990: Peter Witte
