= Heinrich Imig =

German trade unionist and politician

Heinrich Gottlieb Imig (24 February 1893 – 24 February 1956) was a German trade unionist and politician.

Born in Essen, Imig worked as a coal miner from the age of 19. He joined the Social Democratic Party, and also the Alter Verband union. He served in the military during World War I, then returned to mining. In 1920, he was elected to the works committee of his mine, and from 1929 he was the full-time union official for Bochum and Castrop-Rauxel.

In 1933, the Nazis dissolved all trade unions, and Imig found himself unemployed. He set up his own business, then during World War II was conscripted into the air raid police. After the war, he was immediately elected as town clerk of Castrop-Rauxel, and joined the new IG Bergbau union. He won election as its second president in 1949, and was also elected to the executive of the German Trade Union Confederation.

In the 1949 West German federal election, Imig won election, and he also served in the general assembly of the European Coal and Steel Community. In 1953, the position of president of IG Bergbau became available and, although Heinrich Gutermuth won, he immediately stood down in favour of Imig. The following year, Imig was also elected as president of the Miners' International Federation. He died, still in post, in 1956.

Trade union offices
Preceded by August Schmidt	President of IG Bergbau; 1953–1956	Succeeded by Heinrich Gutermuth
Preceded by Achille Delattre	President of the Miners' International Federation; 1954–1956	Succeeded by Nicolas Dethier
