= Anders Stendalen =

Swedish trade union leader (1937–2019)

Anders Stendalen (14 December 1937 – 21 January 2019) was a Swedish trade union leader.

Born in Kiruna, Stendalen began working in the mechanical workshop of LKAB, a state-owned Swedish mining company that mines iron ore at Kiruna and at Malmberget in northern Sweden. At LKAB, he joined the Swedish Miners' Union, and when he was 26, he began working full-time for the union, based in Grängesberg. In 1969, he led the union's negotiations during the Malmfälten strike.

In 1979, Stendalen was elected as the union's president. He focused on increasing its international links, working closely with the National Union of Mineworkers from South Africa, and building a friendship with Cyril Ramaphosa. In 1983, he was elected president of the Miners' International Federation.

By 1993, the mining industry in Sweden was in sharp decline, and the union's membership was down to only 5,500. Stendalen led its merger into the Swedish Metalworkers' Union, and then served as secretary of that union until his retirement in 1997.

In retirement, Stendalen was elected as president of the Cassel Foundation, which ran a concert hall in Grängesberg. He also founded the Gruvcentrum Mojsen, a mining history museum, in the town.

Trade union offices
Preceded by John Näslund	President of the Swedish Miners' Union; 1979–1994	Succeeded by Union merged
Preceded by Adolf Schmidt	President of the Miners' International Federation; 1983–1995	Succeeded by Federation merged
