= Thomas Ashton (trade unionist) =

British trade unionist

Thomas Ashton PC DL (23 March 1844 – 12 October 1927) was a British trade unionist.

Born in Openshaw, Ashton worked as a coal miner from the age of 12, and in 1865 became secretary of the Bradford and Clayton miners' lodge. This dissolved two years later, but Ashton re-established it in 1873, facing victimisation, but also being elected as checkweighman. He subsequently led the formation of the Lancashire and Cheshire Miners' Federation, and was its secretary from 1881.

Ashton next worked with Ben Pickard to establish the Miners' Federation of Great Britain, and he was appointed as its first secretary. Although he personally supported the Conservative Party, he did not attempt to influence the union's political views, which initially followed Pickard's liberalism. He also worked with Pickard to establish the Miners' International Federation, and was its secretary from 1890 until 1914.

In 1917, Ashton was appointed to the Privy Council. He retired from all his union posts in 1919.

== See also ==
- Jesse Butler, his assistant for part of his career.

Trade union offices
| Preceded by New position | Secretary of the Lancashire and Cheshire Miners' Federation; 1881–1919 | Succeeded by Post vacant |
| Preceded by New position | General Secretary of the Miners' Federation of Great Britain; 1889–1919 | Succeeded by Frank Hodges |
| Preceded by New position | Secretary of the Miners' International Federation; 1890–1921 | Succeeded by Frank Hodges |
