= Fritz Husemann =

Friedrich Ernst Husemann (19 September 1873 – 15 April 1935) was a German trade union leader and politician.

Husemann was born in Leopoldsthal (now part of Horn-Bad Meinberg) in the Principality of Lippe. In 1892, he moved to Dortmund, where he worked as a miner, and soon moved on to Bochum. He joined the Union of Miners of Germany, and became increasingly active in it after the strike of 1893.

Husemann was appointed as the secretary of the union's executive committee in 1902, and then in 1919 became the union's president. A member of the Social Democratic Party of Germany, he was also elected to the Bochum Workers' and Soldiers' Council, then served in the Prussian State Assembly from 1919. In 1924, he was elected to the Reichstag, serving until 1933.

Husemann was also active in the Miners' International Federation (MIF), serving as its vice-president, then from 1932 as its president. He was an outspoken opponent of the Nazis, and was arrested in March 1933 for this. Comrades, including those from the MIF, urged him to emigrate to the United States, but he refused to do so, and he was repeatedly arrested for his trade union and socialist activities.

In March 1935, Husemann was arrested for the fourth time, and was sent to the Papenburg-Esterwegen concentration camp. Two days after his admission, he was killed. Officially, he was shot while trying to escape, but he had previously stated that he would endure the internment stoically, and there was no evidence of any escape attempt.

Trade union offices
Preceded by Hermann Sachse	President of the Union of Miners of Germany; 1919–1933	Succeeded by Union dissolved
Preceded by Joseph Dejardin	President of the Miners' International Federation; 1932–1934	Succeeded by Pierre Vigne
