= Achille Delattre =

Belgian politician and trade unionist

Achille Delattre (24 August 1879 – 13 July 1964) was a Belgian politician and trade unionist.

Born in Pâturages, in the Hainaut Province of Belgium, Delattre became a coal miner at the age of twelve. In 1902, he founded a branch of the Belgian Miners' Federation in his village. He spent some time working as a journalist, but from 1914 worked full-time as a trade union organiser and politician.

In 1907, Delattre joined the Belgian Labour Party, winning election to the village council, then in 1921 he was elected to the Chamber of Representatives, representing Bergen. The following year, he was elected to the national executive of the Labour Party.

In 1927, Delattre was persuaded by Herbert Smith to become secretary of the Miners' International Federation (MIF), the first non-Briton to hold the post. He resigned in 1934, becoming Minister of Labour in Belgium from 1935 until 1939, then served as vice-president of the Labour Party until it was banned in 1940. He also served as Mayor of Pâturages in 1939, and again from the end of World War II.

In 1945, Delattre was elected as chair of the Union of Mineworkers of Belgium, and also as president of the MIF. That year, he was one of the former Labour Party politicians who founded the Belgian Socialist Party, and he was also made a Minister of State. He served as Minister for Fuel and Energy from 1947 to 1948, and remained a representative until 1954. He retired from his trade union posts in 1958, but remained Mayor of Pâturages until his death in 1964.

Political offices
Preceded by Edmond Rubbens	Minister of Labour; 1935–1939	Succeeded by Arthur Wauters
Preceded by Achille Van Acker	Minister of Fuel and Energy; 1947–1948	Succeeded by Post vacant
Trade union offices
Preceded by Frank Hodges	Secretary of the Miners' International Federation; 1927–1934	Succeeded by Ebby Edwards
Preceded by Pierre Vigne	President of the Miners' International Federation; 1945–1954	Succeeded by Heinrich Imig
