= Wismut Industrial Union =

Former East German trade union (1950–1990)

The Wismut Industrial Union (German: Industriegewerkschaft Wismut, IG W) was a trade union representing workers at the Wismut uranium mining company.

From 1946, workers at Wismut were represented by the Industrial Union of Mining, part of the Free German Trade Union Federation (FDGB). However, due to the secretive nature of the work they undertook, under the control of the Soviet Union, they were placed in an autonomous section. In 1950, the FDGB decided to move the workers into their own dedicated union, the "Wismut Industrial Union". It was based in Karl-Marx-Stadt, and led sports associations such as SC Karl-Marx-Stadt, and also the popular orchestra, Orchester der IG Wismut.

Membership of the union gradually declined, along with employment by the company, and by 1989, it had 65,555 members. In March 1990, it became independent, and it dissolved in October, its members transferring to the Union of Mining and Energy.

== Presidents ==
1950: Richard Leppi
1951: Heinz Raeder
1952: Werner Lucas
1955: Heinz Schönfeld
1966: Herbert Strienitz
1985: Gotthard Stark
1990: Dieter May
