= Northern Rhodesia Mine Workers' Union =

The Northern Rhodesia Mine Workers' Union (NRMU) was a trade union which existed in Northern Rhodesia between 1936 and 1964. It represented blue-collar, European workers in the copper mining industry.

== History ==
The NRMU was founded in 1936 by Charles Harris, the General Secretary of the Mine Workers' Union, as a local branch of the South African union. Frank Maybank was the general secretary of NRMU. It was soon discovered that the constitution of the South African union did not allow branches to be formed outside of the country, and the branch separated to form an independent Northern Rhodesian body. The mining companies were initially reluctant to negotiate with the new union, however the Colonial Office, concerned by the threat of a strike, instructed the mining companies to recognize the union if it could recruit over 55 percent of the European mineworkers. The union achieved recognition in September 1937.

The union established branches at Broken Hill, Roan Antelope, Mufulira, Nkana and Nchanga, however it struggled to recruit members, and by 1939 membership had fallen to 1,000 out of 2,500 eligible European mineworkers. The main priorities of the union in its early years was to increase its membership and restrict the supply of labour to the mining companies in order to strengthen the bargaining position of the miners. This second objective was threatened by the abundant supply of cheap labour from the local African population. In order to counteract this the union adopted a principle of 'equal pay for equal work', meaning that no Africans would be employed for less than an equivalent European employee. In practice, as the mining companies were not willing to pay European wages to African employees, this meant restricting the employment of African workers in jobs occupied by Europeans.

In March 1940 NRWU launched a strike, which trigged a separate protest movement amongst African workers. In 1942 Maybank was deported from Rhodesia due to his activism. He was not allowed to return to the Copperbelt until the end of the Second World War.
