= Walter Arendt =

German politician

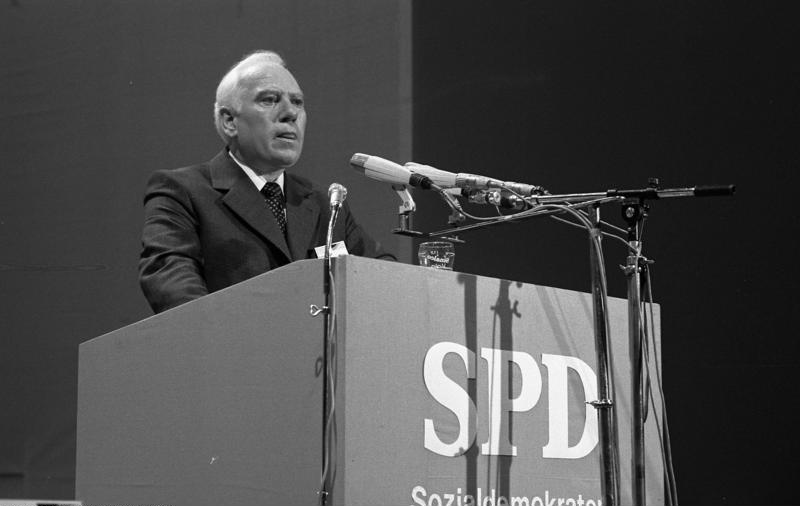
- Arendt in 1976

Federal Minister for Labour and Social Affairs Germany
- In office 22 October 1969 – 14 December 1976
- Chancellor: Willy Brandt (1969-74); Helmut Schmidt (1974-76)
- Preceded by: Hans Katzer
- Succeeded by: Herbert Ehrenberg

Deputy Chairman of the SPD Parliamentary Group in the Bundestag
- In office 14 December 1976 – 4 November 1980

Member of the Bundestag
- In office 17 October 1961 – 4 November 1980

Personal details
- Born: 17 January 1925 Heessen
- Died: 7 March 2005 (aged 80) Bornheim
- Party: SPD (1946 until his death)
- Occupation: Miner

Walter Arendt (born 17 January 1925 in Heessen; died 7 March 2005 in Bornheim) was a German politician of the Social Democratic Party (SPD).

He was Federal Minister of Labour and Social Affairs of Germany from 1969 to 1976.

Since 1946 he was member of the SPD and member of the German Bundestag from 1961 to 1980.

== Biography ==
=== Family, education and profession ===
Arendt was the son of a miner who died early from pneumoconiosis. This was one of his motives in his later strive to improve the situation of miners by enabling them to receive earlier pension.

Trade union offices
Preceded by Heinrich Gutermuth	President of the Union of Mining and Energy; 1964–1969	Succeeded by Adolf Schmidt
Preceded by Heinrich Gutermuth	President of the Miners' International Federation; 1967–1969	Succeeded by ?
