= Ghana Mine Workers' Union =

Trade union representing Ghanaian miners

The Ghana Mine Workers' Union (GMWU) is a trade union representing miners in Ghana.

In 1944, workers in the electric shop in Aboso succeeded in getting their English foreman removed, as he had been enforcing unfair working conditions. They formed the Gold Coast Employees' Union, and in November 1947 the union organised a successful strike for improved working conditions.

In 1957, the Ghana became independent, and the union renamed itself as the "Ghana Mine Workers' Union", in recognition of the country's new name, and the main industry in which it represented workers. By 1960, it had 40,000 members, and had affiliated to the Miners' International Federation and the Ghana Trades Union Congress.

Membership of the union has gradually fallen, and by 2014 it stood at 16,000. In addition to its industrial activities, it formed the Golden Pride Savings and Loans Company.

== General Secretaries ==
1950s: Daniel K. Foevie
1960s: E. Williams
1970s: R. A. Yeboah
1990s: Robert Cole
2000s: Prince William Ankrah
