= Union of Mineworkers of Belgium =

Coal miners union in Belgium

The Union of Mineworkers of Belgium (French: Centrale syndicale des travailleurs des mines de Belgique, CSTMB; Dutch: Nationale Centrale der Mijnwerkers van België, NCMB) was a trade union representing coal miners in Belgium.

== History ==
The union was established on 25 December 1889 as the National Federation of Belgian Miners, incorporating the four major regional unions, which represented Liège, The Center, the Borinage and Charleroi in its early years it focused on reducing working hours and obtaining pensions for elderly miners. Once these were achieved, it also obtained the provision of washing facilities at mines, and a ban on women or children working underground.

Membership of the union grew steadily, from 6,966 in 1899, to 39,417 in 1913. On 1 March 1919, it was reconstituted as the "Union of Mineworkers of Belgium", and its membership increased dramatically, to 123,468 by the end of the year. However, its affiliation with the Belgian Workers' Party led some miners to join the rival Revolutionary Union of Miners, a communist group, or the Union of Free Miners, a Christian trade union. The CSTMB's membership fell continuously until the 1950s, and by 1955 was only 27,500. It affiliated to the General Federation of Belgian Labour (ABVV).

In 1959, a major closure programme led the union to strike, but the ABVV opposed turning this into a general strike, and the action was lost. Closures continued, and by 1994 the union had fewer than 10,000 members remaining. It then merged into the General Union.

== Leadership ==
=== General Secretaries ===
1935: Nicolas Dethier
1958:
1962: Joseph Dedoyard
1966: Robert Balesse
1970: Position abolished?

=== Presidents ===
Joseph Dejardin
1932:
1945: Achille Delattre
1958:
1962: Nicolas Dethier
1974: Jan Olyslaegers
1988:
1990: Lucien Charlier
