= Ernst Bollmann =

German politician

Ernst Bollmann (12 February 1899 in Duisburg – 1974 in Moers) was a German politician. He was a member of the Nazi Party (NSDAP).
