= Mines African Staff Association =

The Mines African Staff Association (MASA) was a Northern Rhodesian trade union which existed between 1953 and 1967. It represented black African salaried employees in Northern Rhodesia's mining industry.

== History ==
Senior African employees first considered forming their own union in 1948, but were discouraged by government officials tasked with establishing trade union representation for black mineworkers, who considered that having multiple unions would undermine the African workers' bargaining position with the employers.

The MASA was first recognized by the companies following the major strikes of 1955, led by the rival African Mineworkers' Union (AMU). The AMU aimed to be an industrial union for all African miners in Northern Rhodesia, and regarded the MASA as a company union which divided the African workforce for the benefit of the mining companies.
