= Lawrence Katilungu =

Zambian trade unionist (1914–1961)

President of the African Mineworkers' Union
- In office March 1949 – December 1969
- Preceded by: (new office)
- Succeeded by: John Chisata

Personal details
- Born: Luwingu; February 1914 Northern Province, Northern Rhodesia
- Died: 9 November 1961 (aged 47)
- Party: Northern Rhodesian African National Congress
- Children: 7
- Occupation: teacher, miner

Lawrence Chola Katilungu (February 1914 – 9 November 1961) was a Northern Rhodesian trade union leader. Katilungu was the first President of the African Mineworkers' Union.

== Biography ==
Katilungu was born in February 1914 in the Northern Province of Northern Rhodesia, the grandson of a minor chief in the Bemba tribe. He initially worked as a mission teacher, before becoming an underground worker at the Nkana mine in 1936, later promoted to recruiting clerk. Katilungu first came to prominence in 1940 as a leader of striking African mineworkers at Nkana. In February 1948, he was elected President of the newly formed Nkana union. In March 1949 all the African miners' unions in Northern Rhodesia, including Nkana, amalgamated to form the African Mineworkers' Union, and Katilungu became president. In 1952, he led a successful strike to gain a wage increase of a half-crown per day for African workers.

Briefly a member of the Constitution Party, Katilungu was made part of the 20-member Monckton Commission, set up by the British government in 1959 to prepare the 1960 conference to review the Constitution of the Federation of Rhodesia and Nyasaland. Two of Katilungu's closest personal friends, Godwin Mbikusita Lewanika and Harry Mwaanga Nkumbula were involved in unionism and politics, and politics respectively.

== Sources ==
- Berger, Elena L. (1974). Labour, Race and Colonial Rule: The Copperbelt from 1924 to Independence. Oxford Studies in African Affairs. Oxford: Clarendon Press. ISBN 0-19-821690-4.
- Campbell, Alexander (1954), "The Heart of Africa", Longmans, Green and Company
- Shillington, Kevin (2005), "Encyclopedia of African History", Routledge ISBN 978-1-57958-245-6
