= Harry Bollman =

Australian rules footballer, born 1902

Personal information
- Full name: Harry Bollman
- Born: 15 September 1902
- Died: 19 December 1984 (aged 82)
- Original team: Yarraville (VFA)

Playing career^{1}
Years	Club	Games (Goals)
1930	Footscray	1 (0)
- ^{1} Playing statistics correct to the end of 1930.

Harry Bollman (15 September 1902 – 19 December 1984) was an Australian rules footballer who played with Footscray in the Victorian Football League (VFL).
