= Swedish Miners' Union =

Trade union in Sweden

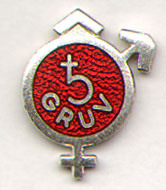
Pin button from Swedish Mine Industry Worker's Union

The Swedish Miners' Union (Swedish: Svenska Gruvindustriarbetareförbundet, Gruv) was a trade union representing workers in the mining industry in Sweden.

The union was founded at a meeting in Grängesberg on 12 October 1895. It initially had 600 members, but grew steadily. It affiliated to the Swedish Trade Union Confederation in 1900, and had 4,504 members by 1908. Membership declined rapidly following that year's general strike, but was gradually rebuilt, and reached an all-time peak of 13,337 in 1958. In the winter of 1969/1970, there was a major unofficial strike in the industry, which prompted a brief rebound in membership, but the overall trend was downwards, along with employment in the industry. By 1993, the union had only 5,600 members. The following year, it merged into the Swedish Metalworkers' Union.

== Presidents ==
1895: Karl-Erik Berg
Edward Mattsson
Vilhelm Isaksson
1960s: Nils Lindell
1970: John Näslund
1979: Anders Stendalen
