= Northern Rhodesian African Mineworkers' Union =

Northern Rhodesia trade union

A.M.U.
- Northern Rhodesian African Mineworkers' Union
- Merged into: Mineworkers' Union of Zambia
- Founded: 1949
- Dissolved: 1967
- Location: Northern Rhodesia
- Key people: Lawrence Katilungu, President; Matthew Nkoloma, General Secretary

The Northern Rhodesian African Mineworkers' Union (A.M.U.) was a trade union in Northern Rhodesia which represented black African miners in the Copperbelt. The AMU was formed in 1949, and campaigned actively to improve working conditions and wages for African miners, as well as opposing racial discrimination in hiring. The union amalgamated with several other mining unions in 1967 to form the Mineworkers' Union of Zambia.

== History ==
=== Formation ===
Trade union organisation among African mineworkers was first initiated in 1935, when workers spontaneously struck over an increase in the native tax levied on Africans living in urban areas. In 1940 following a successful strike by European mine employees, violent clashes occurred in which 17 African miners were killed and 69 injured. The Forster Commission was established to address problems in the working conditions of African miners in response to the incident. In 1945 the new British Labour government decided to encourage the establishment of African trade unions in the British African colonies, and advisors from the British Trades Union Congress were sent to Northern Rhodesia to facilitate the process of establishing the unions. In 1947 the existing union representing European miners, the Northern Rhodesia Mine Workers' Union (NRMU), suggested that the African workers join, but this was rejected by the African miners. In 1947 and 1948 unions were formed at all four major copper mines in Northern Rhodesia, and these merged to form the African Mineworkers' Union in 1949, receiving recognition from the mining companies in the same year.

=== The Industrial Colour Bar ===
The primary issue during the early years of the union was the practice of reserving skilled jobs for white employees, known as the industrial colour bar. In 1947 the British government had established the Dalgleish Commission to investigate the colour bar, and the Commission recommended the gradual replacement of European workers with Africans, initially in low-skilled occupations, but gradually filling other positions after training. The Dalgliesh Commission recommended that positions be filled with African workers only when vacant, so that no European workers were displaced. The NRMU strongly resisted any attempt to transfer jobs to the African workers, relying on a clause in their agreement with the companies that prevented jobs being filled by workers not covered by the existing contract. In 1951 the NRMU signed an agreement with the AMU that any African worker replacing a white worker must be paid and housed to the same standard as the European employee. This effectively delayed the transfer of jobs to African workers, as the employers were not prepared to fulfil this condition.

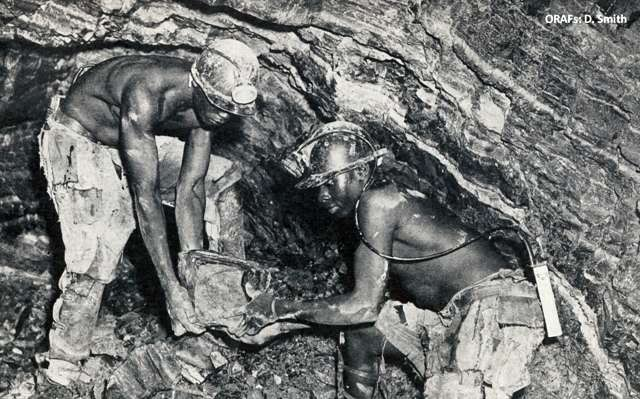
Two African miners working in an underground copper mine in Northern Rhodesia in the early 1950s.

=== Industrial Conflict ===
In 1952 the AMU launched a major strike, halting copper production for three weeks. This was followed by the provision of significantly improved wages in the Guillebaud Award of January 1953. By 1954 in excess of 75% of African miners were members of the AMU, giving them a strong bargaining position.

In the 1950s the major mining companies, with the support of the Colonial Office, began attempting to replace the skilled European mineworkers with African workers. Ronald Prain, the Chairman of the Rhodesian Selection Trust, announced they would break the industrial colour bar in 1953, and end the equal pay condition imposed by the unions. In February 1955 Anglo American also announced plans to replace white workers with Africans. In September 1955 a formal agreement was reached, with 24 job classes transferred to African workers, with further advancement of African miners to be reviewed.

The AMU continued to press for the improvement of the position of African miners, with numerous strikes throughout 1955 and 1956. Contrary to the expectations of the Northern Rhodesian Government and mining companies, the AMU sought increases in wages for all mineworkers, rather than focussing solely on further breaking down the colour bar. This was the aim of a major strike in January 1955, in which 28,885 out of 34,000 African workers took part. The strike lasted until March, costing £2,000,000 in lost production. The African miners returned to work without achieving their initial aim of an increase in wages of ten shillings and eightpence per shift, however a smaller increase was awarded some time later.

The strength and militancy of the AMU led the government and mining companies to support the establishment of a rival union for skilled African workers in 1953, the Mines African Staff Association (MASA). This was opposed by the AMU who felt that the new union was designed to undermine the AMU by depriving them of members and splitting the African workforce. In response to a series of strikes throughout the Copperbelt during 1956 the government declared a state of emergency, arresting and banishing the leaders of the AMU from the region. An inquiry, known as the Branigan Report, was established to investigate possible links between African nationalist groups and the AMU.

=== Politics ===
The AMU was active at the same time as the Northern Rhodesian African National Congress was agitating politically for improved rights for Africans, however the union's president, Lawrence Katilungu, did not support the AMU becoming involved in politics. The union declined to participate in a planned strike by the Congress in 1953 to protest the establishment of the Federation of Rhodesia and Nyasaland. The AMU was involved in a dispute with other Northern Rhodesian unions in the late 1950s when they attempted to dismiss Lawrence Katilungu from the leadership of the Northern Rhodesian Trades Union Congress (NRTUC). Katilungu responded by expelling all unions in arrears with their fees, leaving only three mining unions as affiliates of the NRTUC. The other unions responded by establishing a rival body, the Reformed Trades Union Congress (RTUC) in February 1960. The NRTUC and RTUC later merged in 1961 after Katilungu had been dismissed from the presidency of the AMU.

=== Amalgamation ===
Following national independence in 1964 the AMU changed its name to the Zambian Mineworkers' Union (ZMU). In April 1967 the ZMU amalgamated with the Mines Local Staff Association and the Mines Police Association to form the Mineworkers' Union of Zambia (MUZ). The amalgamation had the support of the government, as it brought an end to the conflict between the ZMU and the ruling party, the United National Independence Party.
