= Union of Mining and Energy =

The Union of Mining and Energy (German: IG Bergbau und Energie, IGBE) was a trade union in West Germany which existed from 1946 until 1997.

== History ==
In the early 20th-century, there were several miners' unions in Germany, the most important being the Union of Miners of Germany. All German unions were forcibly dissolved by the Nazis in 1933.

The union was founded in 1946, covering only the British Occupation Zone. From 1948, it began covering the mining industry in the whole of West Germany and adopted the name IG Bergbau. In 1960 the union added "and energy" to its name.

In 1990, the East German Wismut Industrial Union, representing uranium miners, merged into IGBE. By 1996, the union had 335,317 members, but 49% of these were not active - either retired or unemployed. In 1997, the union merged with the IG Chemie-Papier-Keramik, and Gewerkschaft Leder, to form the IG Bergbau, Chemie, Energie.

== Leadership ==
=== Presidents ===
1946: August Schmidt
1953: Heinrich Imig
1956: Heinrich Gutermuth
1964: Walter Arendt
1969: Adolf Schmidt
1985: Heinz-Werner Meyer
1990: Hans Berger

=== Vice presidents ===
1946: Willy Agatz
1948: Heinrich Imig
1953: Heinrich Gutermuth
1956: Fritz Dahlmann
1964: Heinz Oskar Vetter
1969: Karl van Bark
1971: Helmut Gelhorn
1978: Hans Alker
1984: Heinz-Werner Meyer
1985: Walter Beer
1988: Hans Berger
1990: Klaus Südhofer
