= Beyne-Heusay =

Municipality in Liège Province, Wallonia, Belgium

Beyne-Heusay Binne-Heuze (Walloon)
- Municipality
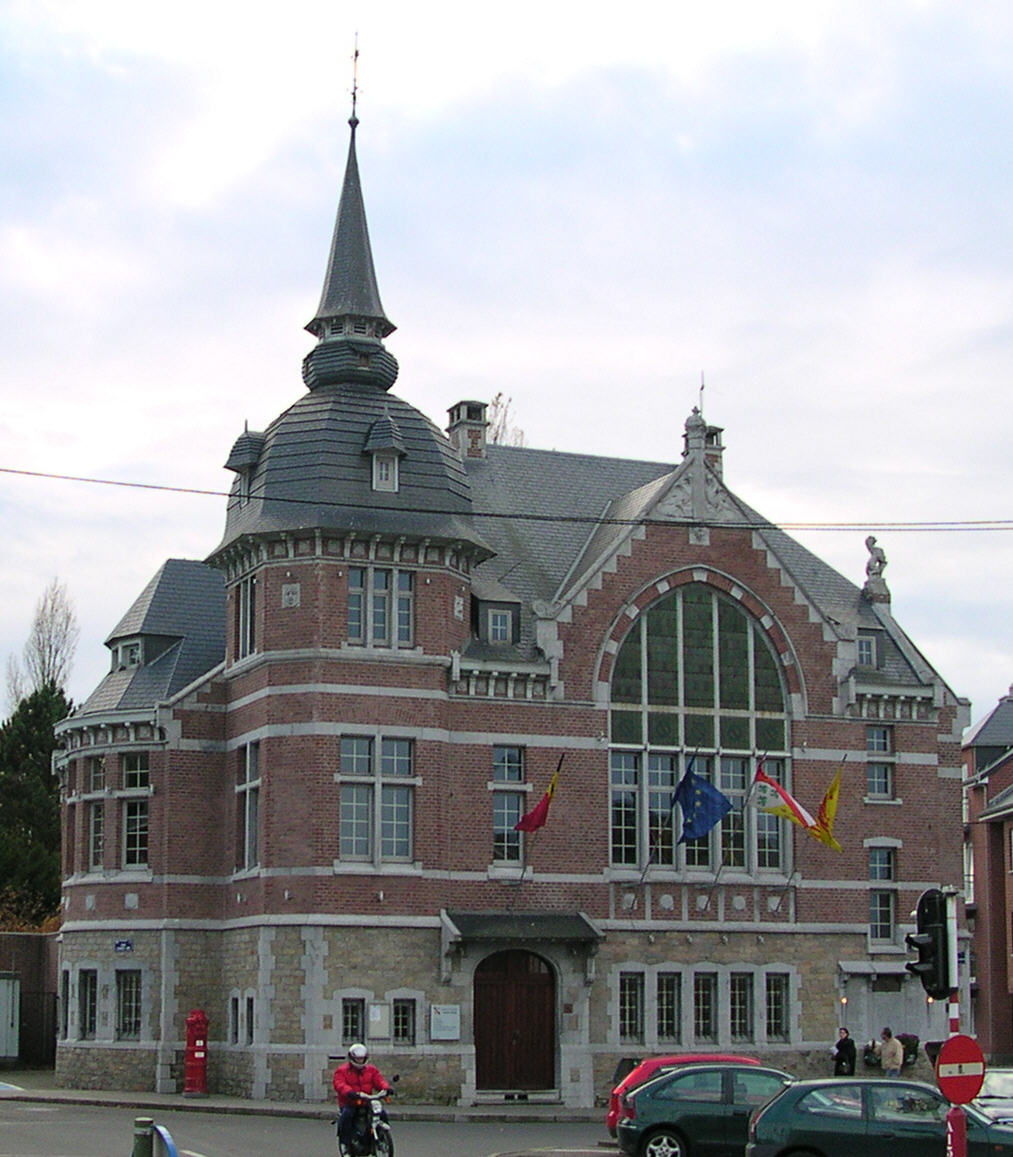
- Beyne-Heusay town hall

- Flag Coat of arms

- Location of Beyne-Heusay in Liège province
- Interactive map of Beyne-Heusay
- Location in Belgium
- Coordinates: 50°37′N 05°39′E
- Country: Belgium
- Community: French Community
- Region: Wallonia
- Province: Liège
- Arrondissement: Liège

Government
  - Mayor: Didier Henrottin (PS)
  - Governing party: PS

Area
  - Total: 7.29 km^{2} (2.81 sq mi)

Population (2018-01-01)
  - Total: 12,019
  - Density: 1,650/km^{2} (4,270/sq mi)
- Postal codes: 4610
- NIS code: 62015
- Area codes: 04
- Website: www.beyne-heusay.be

Beyne-Heusay (French pronunciation: [bɛn øzɛ]; Walloon: Binne-Heuzea) is a municipality of Wallonia located in the province of Liège, Belgium.

On January 1, 2006, Beyne-Heusay had a total population of 11,711. The total area is 7.32 km^{2} which gives a population density of 1,600 inhabitants per km^{2}.

The municipality consists of the following districts: Bellaire, Beyne-Heusay, and Queue-du-Bois.

== Twin towns – sister cities ==
Beyne-Heusay is twinned with:

- Wasquehal, France since 1979
- Clécy, France since 1980

== Image gallery ==
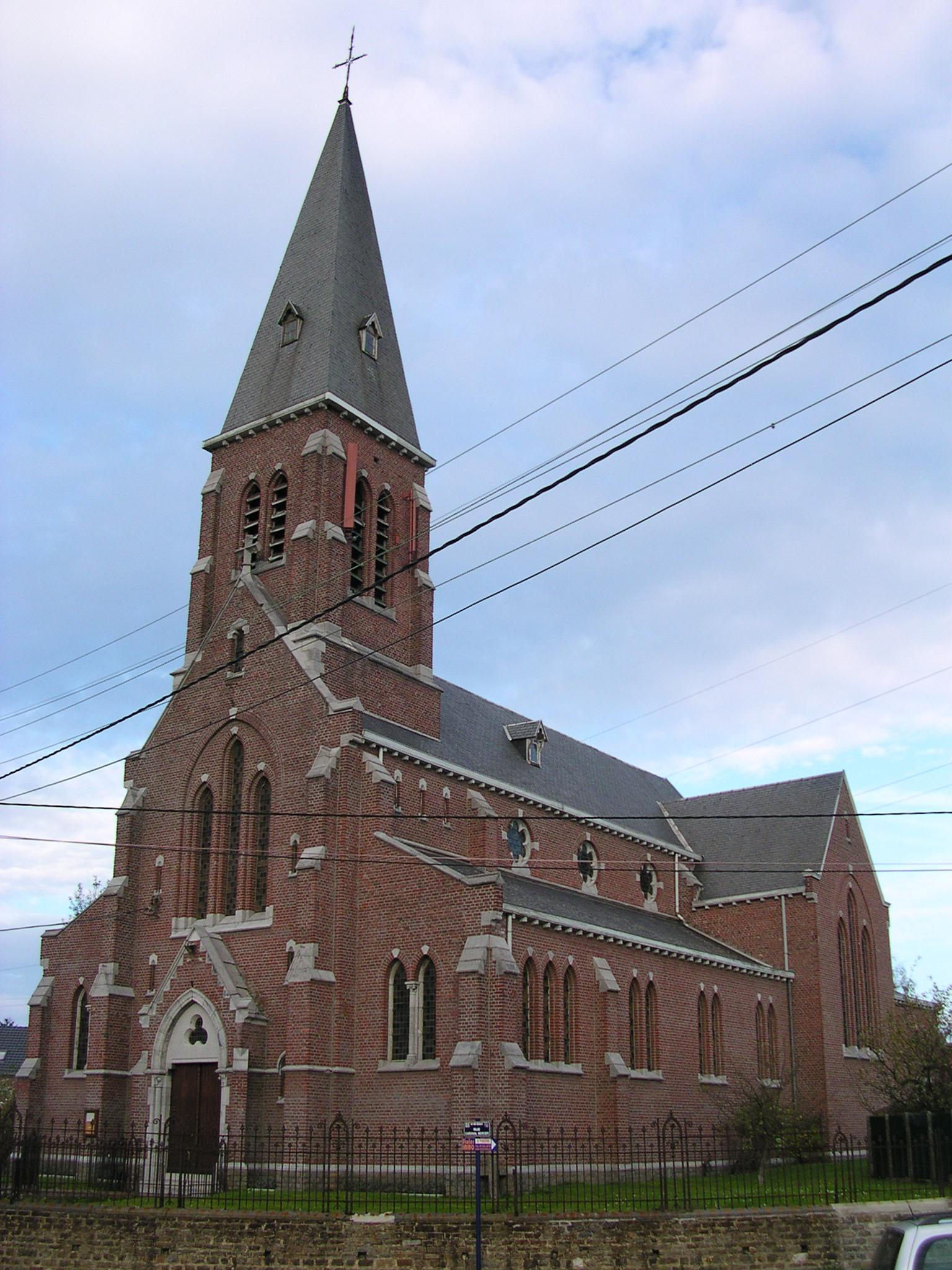

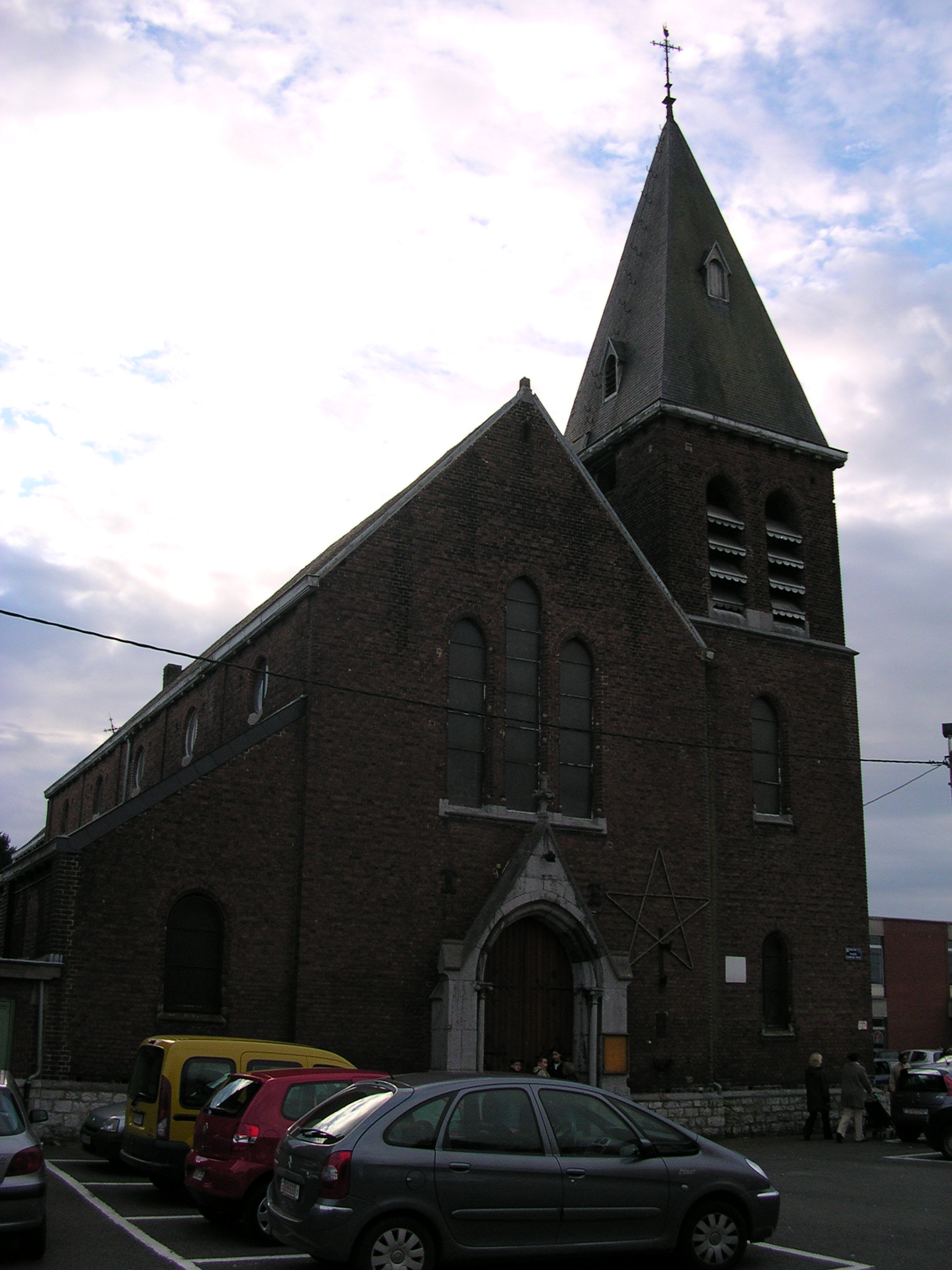

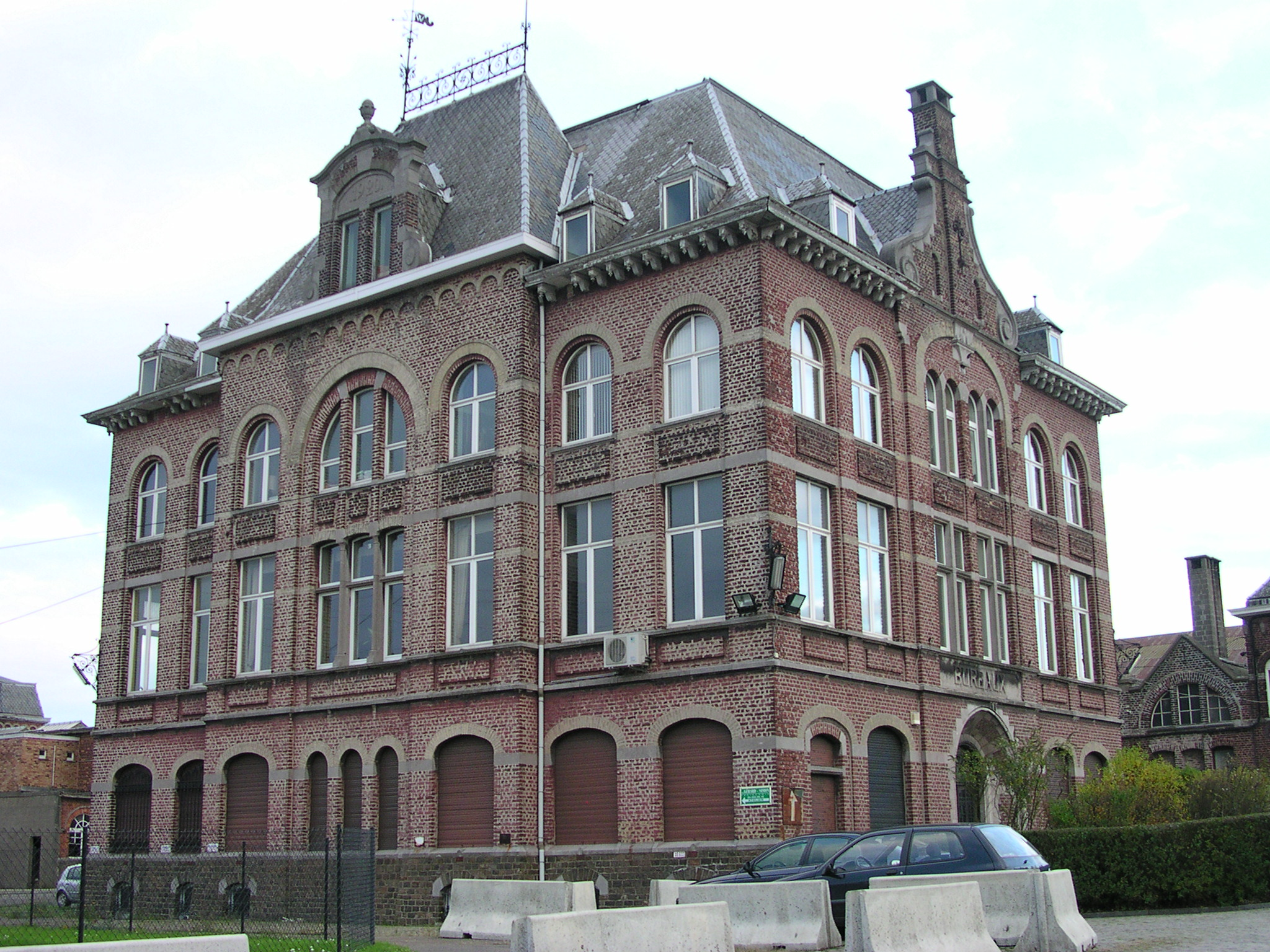
