= Gerd Bollmann =

German politician (1947–2017)

Gerd Friedrich Bollmann (September 28, 1947 in Wanne-Eickel, Herne, North Rhine-Westphalia – September 17, 2017) was a German politician. A member of the SPD, Bollman served in the Bundestag from 2002 to 2013, representing the electoral district of Herne – Bochum II.

He died on September 17, 2017, at the age of 69.
