= Trade Unions International of Energy Workers =

The Trade Unions International of Energy Workers has been the name of two Trade Union International affiliated with the World Federation of Trade Unions

- Trade Unions International of Miners, became the Trade Unions International of Miners and Energy Workers in 1983 and the Trade Unions International of Energy Workers in 1986. It merged into the Trade Union International of Energy, Metal, Chemical, Oil and Allied Industries in 1998
- Trade Union International of Energy Workers (2007) - the name the Trade Union International of Energy, Metal, Chemical, Oil and Allied Industries adopted after a restructuring in 2007
