= Henri Jourdain =

French trade unionist (1909–1988)

- Born: 1 June 1909; Ennordres, France
- Died: 14 April 1988 (aged 86)
- Organizations: United General Confederation of Labor; General Confederation of Labour; Trade Union International of Workers in the Metal Industry; World Federation of Trade Unions

Henri Jourdain (1 June 1909 – 14 April 1988) was a French trade union leader.

Born in Ennordres, France, Jourdain was orphaned at the age of nine. He moved in with a cousin and began working at the age of 13. When he was 20, he completed his compulsory military service with the Navy, where he trained as a mechanic. He then found work at the Wybot aviation factory, and joined the United General Confederation of Labour (CGTU). He became the treasurer of his union branch, and took part in the strikes of 1933.

Jourdain joined the French Communist Party in 1936. That year, the CGTU merged into the General Confederation of Labour, and Jourdain joined the Paris regional union of metallurgists, part of the Metalworkers' Federation (FTM). He was elected as the union's secretary in 1938, but in 1939 was called up to serve in the French Navy, working at the seaplane base in Etang de Berre.

With the defeat of France, Jourdain was demobilised, and returned to Paris. The FTM had been banned, but he worked with Benoît Frachon and Eugène Hénaff to maintain some underground organisation. In November 1941, he was arrested and sentenced to ten years' forced labour. He was placed in a succession of camps, and in 1945 was elected as general secretary of the liberation committee of the last one, Linz III.

Returning to France, Jourdain was immediately asked to represent the reformed FTM, and in 1946, he was appointed as the union's secretary, with responsibility for aviation. He encouraged the formation of works councils, and led various strikes. From 1947 to 1951, he also served on the Economic Council. These activities led him to prominence, and in 1949, he was elected as the first general secretary of the Trade Union International of Workers in the Metal Industry.

In 1953, Jourdain became secretary of the World Federation of Trade Unions, working closely with general secretary Louis Saillant. Based in Vienna, Jourdain travelled widely, but felt that he was making little impact, and resigned in 1957. He returned to work for the FTM, taking charge of propaganda. Early in the 1960s, he was placed in charge of economics for the French Communist Party (PCF), and won election to its central committee.

By 1973, Jourdain's health was declining, and he moved to lead a PCF commission on the party structure in large companies, but in 1975, he also left this activity. In 1983, he was awarded the Légion d'honneur.

Trade union offices
Preceded by New position	General Secretary of the Trade Union International of Workers in the Metal Industry; 1949–1955	Succeeded by Marcel Bras
