= Trade Union International of Workers in the Metal Industry =

International trade union federation

The Trade Union International of Workers in the Metal Industry was a trade union international affiliated to the World Federation of Trade Unions.

== History ==
The TUI was founded at a conference in Turin, Italy on June 2, 1949 as the Trade Union International of the Metal and Engineering Industries. (Other sources say June 21.)

In 1998 the TUI merged with the Trade Unions International of Chemical, Oil and Allied Workers and the Trade Union International of Energy Workers to found the Trade Union International of Energy, Metal, Chemical, Oil and Allied Industries at a conference in Havana. In 2007 the latter reformed as the Trade Union International of Energy Workers. The metal and mining workers then formed the Trade Union International of Workers in the Mining, the Metallurgy and the Metal Industries.

== Organization ==
The highest organ of the TUI was the International Trade Conference held every four years which elected an administrative committee and a secretariat. It also had specialized commissions on steel, shipbuilding, the automobile industry, mechanical and electro-electronic constr4uction as well as a Standing Committee on Peace and Disarmament.

In 1955 its address was reported as Seilerstaette 3, Vienna 1, Austria. It shared the address with the Trade Unions International of Miners Unions, the Trade Unions International of Transport Workers and the World Federation of Teachers Unions. By 1957 its headquarters were Janska 100, Prague 1, Czechoslovakia where it again shared the address with the TUIs of Transport Workers, Miners and Teachers By 1978 it moved to BP158 Moscow K9, Soviet Union, an address it would keep until at least 1991.

== Members ==
At the TUIs founding conference in 1949 there 62 delegates representing 16 countries and seven and half million workers. Five other countries were represented by observers. States represented included the Soviet Union, Czechoslovakia, Italy, France and the Netherlands. In 1958 it claimed 10,050,000 members in 18 countries. In 1976 the TUI included 36 organizations in 28 countries representing 20 million members. And in 1985 it claimed 58 affiliates in 42 countries representing 22 million workers.

- Austria - Left Bloc of the Union of Metal, Mining and Energy
- Benin - Syndicat Professionnel des Travaileurs de la Mechanique Generale et de la Metalurgie
- Bulgaria - Union of Workers in Engineering Industry
- Chile - Co-operation Exteriure de CUT
- Cyprus - Cyprus Mechanics and Electricians Trade Unions
- Colombia - Federación Nacional de Trabajadores del Metal
- Congo - Fédération Syndicale des Travaileurs de l'Industrie et de la Metalurgie
- Cuba - Federación Nacional de Trabajadores de Industria Basica
- Czechoslovakia - Union of Workers in the Metal Industries
- El Salvador - Sindicato de Trabajadores de la Industria Mecanica y Metalicas Basica
- France - Metalworkers' Federation, CGT
- France - National Federation of State Workers
- East Germany - Industrial Union of Metal
- Hungary - National Federation of Metal Workers
- India - National Federation of Metal and Engineering Workers of India
- India - All India Steel Workers' Federation
- Iraq - General Trade Union of Metalworkers
- Jordan - General Federation of Jordanian Trade Unions, General Federation of Metal Workers
- North Korea - Union of Metal and Engineering Workers of Korea
- Madagascar - Syndicat des Travailleurs des la Metalurgie, Bois et Batiments Fi.Se.Ma.
- Nigeria - Nigerian Steel Development Authority Workers' Union
- Peru - Federación de Trabajadores de la Industria del Metal de Peru, CGTP
- Poland - Związek Zawodowy Hutników w Polsce
- Poland - Związek Zawodowy Metalowców w Polsce
- Romania - Union des Syndicats des enterprises de l'Industrie Metallurgique et de Constructions Mechanique
- Soviet Union - Central Committee of the Metalworkers Union
- Soviet Union - Central Committee of the Engineering Workers Union
- Soviet Union - Central Committee of the Power-station Workers Union
- Soviet Union - Central Committee of the Shipbuilding Workers Union
- Sri Lanka - Industrial and General Workers Union
- Sri Lanka - Ceylon Engineering Workers Union
- Syria - Professional Federation of Mining, Light Industry and Mechanical Workers
- Uruguay - Unión Nacional de Trabajadores del Metal y Rames Afines
- Venezuela - SINATRAMETAL
- Venezuela - Sindicato Unificado de Trabajadores de la Siderugia, de las Minas, del Metal, del Automovil y de la ramas afines
- Vietnam - National Union of Metal and Engineering Workers

== Leadership ==
=== General Secretaries ===
1949: Henri Jourdain
1955: Marcel Bras
1956: Giovanni Roveda
1958: Giacomo Adduci
1964: Pierre Gensous
1966: Jean Desmaison
1969: Mauro Pacci
1973: Pierre Baghi
1981: Alain Stern
1987: Daniel Bailly
1989: Gilbert Le Bescond

=== Presidents ===
1949: Giovanni Roveda
1956: Livio Mascarello
1959: Pierre Gensous
1962:
1974: Lajos Méhes
1978: Reinhard Sommer
1989:

== See also ==
- International Metalworkers' Federation
