= Trade Unions International of Chemical, Oil and Allied Workers =

Logo of the ICPS

The Trade Unions International of Chemical, Oil and Allied Workers was a trade union international affiliated with the World Federation of Trade Unions. It was often known by its French initials, ICPS (Union Internationale des Syndicats des Industries, Chimiques, du Petroles et Similares).

== History ==
The Union was established at a conference in Budapest, Hungary in March 1950 as the Trade Unions International of Chemical and Allied Workers. It changed its name in 1954 when it expanded its scope to include oil workers. It also represented workers in the glassware, paper and ceramic industries.

In 1998 a Conference was held in Havana which merged Trade Unions International of Energy Workers (formerly known as the Trade Unions International of Miners) and Trade Union International of Metal and Engineering Workers to form the Trade Union International of Energy, Metal, Chemical, Oil and Allied Industries. This organization was reorganized again as the Trade Unions International of Energy Workers in 2007. This left the metal workers an opportunity create a new TUI the next year, Trade Union International of Workers in the Mining, the Metallurgy and the Metal Industries.

== Organization ==
The TUI was governed by an international trade conference held every four years. The Conference drew up the groups program, made policy decisions and elected an administrative committee. The latter consisted of 25 members drawn from 20 countries and met once a year. The bureau, composed of the TUI president, vice-presidents, general secretary and secretaries met to ensure the fulfillment of the administrative committees decisions and a permanent secretariat oversaw day-to-day operations. Industrial Commissions were also set up to deal with specific issues. In 1978 there commissions on oil (drilling, refining, oil pipelines, distribution), chemicals-pharmaceuticals, paper board, pulp, cellulose, rubber, glass and ceramics.

In 1955 its headquarters were reported to be in Bucharest, Romania. In 1958 its headquarters was reported to be at 17 Sztalin ter, Budapest VI, Hungary. From 1978 to 1989 it was reported to be at 1415 Budapest, sometimes given the street name Benczur ut 45. In 1991 it was reported at EM26, H 1097.

== Membership ==
In 1958 the ICPS claimed membership in 25 countries. In 1976 it claimed 7 million members in 59 affiliated unions in 37 countries. In 1985 it claimed 13 million members in 100 affiliate in 50 countries.

In 1975 the following unions were affiliated with ICPS:

- Albania - Conseil Central des Unions Professionelles
- Argentina - Federacion Argentina de Trabajadores de la Industia Quimicas y Afines
- Austria - Fraktion Gewerkschaftlicher Linksblock in der Gewerkschaft der Chemiearbeiter
- Benin - Syndicat National de Travailleurs des Industries Alimentaires et Chimiques, Hotels-Bar, Cafes-Restaurants
- Bulgaria - Syndicat des Travailleurs de l'Industrie Chimique
- Bulgaria - Syndicat des Travailleurs de l'Industrie Legare
- Chile - Sindicato Unico Nacional de Trabajadores de Quimica y Fammaceutica y Ramos Afines
- Chile - Sindicato Unico de Trabajadores del Plastico
- China - Oil Workers' Union
- China - Trade Union of Workers in Heavy Industry
- Colombia - Federación de los Trabajadores de Petrole
- Congo - Fédération des Travailleurs des Mines, Petrol, Energie et Assimiles
- Cuba - Sindicato Nacional de Trabajadores de la Industria Basicos
- Cuba - Sindicato Nacional de Trabajadores del Petrole
- Czechoslovakia - Federation of Chemical, Paper, Glass and Printing Workers
- Ecuador - Federación Nacional de Trabajadores del Petrole
- France - National Federation of Chemical Industries, CGT
- France - Fédération des Travailleurs des Industries Papetiers, CGT
- France - Fédération Nationale des Travailleurs du Verre, CGT
- France - Fédération Nationale des Travailleurs de la Ceramique
- East Germany - Industrial Union of Chemicals, Glass and Ceramics
- East Germany - Industrial Union of Printing and Paper
- Ghana - General Transport, Petroleum and Chemical Workers' Union
- Hungary - Chemical Workers' Union
- Hungary - Printing, Paper and Press Workers Unions
- Hungary - Building and Building Materials Industry Workers Union
- India - All India Pharmaceutical Employees' Union
- India - All India Chemical and Pharmaceutical Employees' Federation
- India - All India Indian Oxygen and Acetyne Employees' Federation
- India - Oil and Natural Gas Commission Karamchari Union
- India - Antibiotics Project Karamchari Sangh
- Indonesia - Oil Workers' Union (PERBUM)
- Iraq - General Trade Union of Oil Industry, Minerals and Chemical Workers
- Italy - Federazione Italiana Lavoratori Poligraficie Cartai
- Jordan - General Federation of Jordanian Trade Unions
- Kenya - Kenya Petroleum Oil Workers Union
- North Korea - Trade Union of Chemical Industry Workers
- Kuwait - Workers' and Employees' Petroleum Trade Union
- Madagascar - Union Nationale des Travailleurs du Petrole, du Livre Papier et du Artes Graphiques
- Nigeria - Gulf Oil Company (Nigeria) Employees and General Workers Union
- Peru - Federación de Trabajadores de la Industia de Plasticos y Afines
- Poland - Federation of Chemical Workers Unions
- Poland - Union des Syndicats de l'Industry du Bois (Papier Carton)
- Pakistan-All Pakistan Oil and Gas Employees Federation (APOGEF)
- Romania - Federation of Chemical Workers Unions
- Soviet Union - Oil, Chemical and Gas Workers Union
- Soviet Union - Building and Building Materials Workers Union
- Soviet Union - Timber, Paper and Wood Workers Union
- Soviet Union - Public Health Workers Union
- Sri Lanka - Lanka Petroleum Employees' Union
- Sri Lanka - Ceylon State Corporation Employees' Union
- Sudan - Federation of Petroleum Workers
- Syria - Professional Federation of Petroleum, Electricity and
- Uruguay - Federación ANCAP
- Uruguay - Federación Obrera de la Industria del Vidrio
- Venezuela - Glass Workers Federation
- Vietnam - National Union of Chemical Workers
- South Yemen - General Union of Petroleum Workers

== Publications ==
The Union published an Information Bulletin and Information Sheet.

== Leadership ==
=== General Secretaries ===
1950: Ferenc Bozsoki
1959: Georges Vanhaute
1967: Pal Forgacs
c.1980: Alain Covet

=== Presidents ===
1950: Bianchi
1950s: Luciano Lama
c.1960: Laszlo Gal
Ferenc Dajka
