= Trade Union International of Workers in Tourism and Hotels =

The Trade Union International of Workers in Tourism and Hotels (HOTOUR) is a trade union international affiliated with the World Federation of Trade Unions

== History ==
HOTOUR was founded a conference in Athens December 1–2, 2009 attended by 68 trade unionists from 17 countries. It held its third congress in Alexandria in February 2020. As of 2020, the international was led by general secretary Mamdouh Mohamady Mohamed, while its president was Janaka Adikari.

== Organization ==
The "superior authority" is the International Congress which is regularly held every five years, but periodical congresses may be called by the Executive Council. The Executive Council is elected by the Congress by secret ballot and includes the Chairmen, General Secretary, Assistant General Secretary and five vice-presidents representing the continents. It also includes the "Committee of economic control that consists of the secretary of the economics and two more members that are elected of the international congress." The Executive Secretariat is composed of the "committees of social insurance and health at work, Hygiene and Safety, the international relations". The federation's seat is at 3 Glastsonos street Omonia 106 77 Stoa Flexi 7th floor, Athens.

== Members ==
Member organizations as of 2014 include:

- Bangladesh -
- Brazil - NCST
- Brazil - CONTRATUH
- Democratic Republic of the Congo - COOSEPP
- Croatia - Socialist Workers’ Party
- Cuba - Sind. Nacion. Hotel y Turis.
- Cyprus - SYXKA PEO
- France - FSM ANTENA
- Greece - Syndicate of Employees in Catering – Tourism – Hotels of Attica
- Greece - Trade Union of Hotel Athenaeum Intercontinental
- Greece - Trade Union of Athens Metropolitan Hotel
- Greece - Trade Union of Athens Ledra Marriott Hotel
- Greece - Trade Union of Hotel Hilton
- Kenya - Hotels and Allied Workers Union
- Lebanon - Federation of Restaurant and Hotels Employees
- Lebanon - ALWAFAA
- Nigeria - National Union of Hotels and Personal Services Workers
- Palestine - GUPW
- Poland - FESAHT
- Syria -
- Vietnam - VGCL
