= Pierre Gensous =

French politician (1925–2017)

Pierre Gensous (25 July 1925 – 2 December 2017) was a French trade unionist.

Born in Mont-de-Marsan, Gensous became a metalworker, and joined his trade union. In 1945, he also joined the French Communist Party (PCF).

In 1953, Gensous was sacked for taking part in a strike, and was out of work for about a year. He finally found employment, and then in 1954 won election as general secretary of the French Metalworkers' Federation, an affiliate of the General Confederation of Labour (CGT).

From 1959 until 1962, Gensous served as president of the Trade Union International of Workers in the Metal Industry, and then in 1964, he became its general secretary. In 1965, he won election as deputy general secretary of the World Federation of Trade Unions (WFTU), and then in 1969 he was elected as its general secretary.

From 1970, Gensous served on the executive of the PCF. The CGT developed disagreements with the WFTU, and Gensous decided that his primary loyalty was to the CGT. He stood down from the WFTU in 1978, becoming head of the Centre for International Research and Co-operation, and remained on the national executive of the CGT until his retirement in 1989.

Trade union offices
Preceded by Giacomo Adduci	General Secretary of the Trade Union International of Workers in the Metal Industry; 1964–1965	Succeeded by Jean Desmaison
Preceded by Louis Saillant	General Secretary of the World Federation of Trade Unions; 1969–1978	Succeeded by Enrique Pastorino
