= Nguyễn Huy Cận =

Vietnamese politician

Nguyễn Huy Cận (born 4 April 1953) is a Vietnamese politician. He was a member of the 12th National Assembly of Vietnam, elected from Ho Chi Minh City. He was also a member of the 10th Presidium of the Vietnam General Confederation of Labour.
