= Reinhard Sommer =

German trade union leader (born 1921)

Reinhard Sommer (born 13 July 1921) is a German former trade union leader.

== Life and career ==
Born in Köppelsdorf (now part of Sonneberg), in Thuringia, Sommer completed an apprenticeship as a locksmith and machine fitter, then worked as a mechanic until 1941, when he was called up for military service. He joined the Luftwaffe, eventually becoming a Non-Commissioned Officer, but was taken prisoner. He escaped shortly before the end of the war, and returned to Thuringia, working as a locksmith.

In 1945, Sommer joined the Social Democratic Party of Germany (SPD), and a trade union which soon became part of the Industrial Union of Metal (IG Metall), itself part of the Free German Trade Union Federation (FDGB). He was elected to the FDGB council in Sonneberg, and in 1947 became its full-time secretary. He attended the Parteihochschule Karl Marx in 1950, and then worked at FDGB headquarters in Berlin.

In 1952, Sommer was appointed as vice president of IG Metall, serving until 1957, when he became the president of the FDGB organisation at the VEB Berliner Metallhütten und Halbzeugwerke company. In 1959, he became president of IG Metall's Berlin district, and then in 1961, he was elected as the president of IG Metall. Alongside this, from 1962 to 1964, he studied economics part-time at the University of Leipzig.

As leader of IG Metall, Sommer was also appointed to both the executive and the presidium of the FDGB. In 1961, he became vice president of the Trade Union International of Workers in the Metal Industry, and then in 1978, he became its president, also serving on the General Council of the World Federation of Trade Unions. From 1976, Sommer he also served in the Volkskammer, as a representative of the FDGB.

In 1988, Sommer retired as leader of IG Metall, due to poor health. However, he became the president of the FDGB's veteran's commission. He left his remaining posts in 1989.

Trade union offices
Preceded by Rolf Berger	President of the Industrial Union of Metal; 1961–1988	Succeeded by Gerhard Nennstiel
