= Liliane Marchais =

French political activist (1935–2020)

- Born: 24 August 1935; Malakoff, France
- Died: 9 April 2020 (aged 84); Bry-sur-Marne, France
- Occupation: Political Activist

Liliane Marchais (24 August 1935 – 9 April 2020) was a French communist activist.

== Biography ==
Born in Malakoff on 24 August 1935, Marchais' father was a toolmaker, and her mother was unemployed. In 1961, she married Maurice Garcia, a member of the French Communist Party, with whom she had a daughter, Annie. The couple divorced, and Liliane married Georges Marchais in 1977. They had a son, Olivier. The family lived in Champigny-sur-Marne, a suburb southeast of Paris.

The holder of a Certificat d'études primaires and a Certificat d'aptitude professionnelle, Marchais worked as a cable worker for Compagne générale de la télégraphie sans fil in her hometown of Malakoff.[6] At age 15, she joined the Union des jeunes républicains de France, which became the Mouvement Jeunes Communistes de France. In 1952, she joined the French Communist Party and the General Confederation of Labor a year later. She was an executive of the Metalworkers' Federation from 1960 to 1964, and served on the Communist Party's management in Val-de-Marne until 1996. She played an essential role in the party while her husband was the leader.

Following a stroke, Marchais left her home in Champigny-sur-Marne and moved into a care home in Bry-sur-Marne. She died of COVID-19 on 9 April 2020, at the age of 84. The Communist Party's national secretary, Fabien Roussel, announced her death via a press release. She was buried on 16 April in Champigny-sur-Marne, next to her husband.
