= Desmaison =

Desmaison is a French surname. Notable people with the surname include:

- Jean Desmaison (1931–1991), French trade union leader
- René Desmaison (1930–2007), French mountain climber
- Walter Desmaison (born 1991), French rugby union player
