= Bitossi (surname) =

Bitossi is an Italian surname. Notable people with the surname include:

- Franco Bitossi (born 1940), Italian former professional cyclist
- Gervasio Bitossi (1884–1951), Italian general during World War II
- Renato Bitossi (1899–1969), Italian trade unionist and communist activist
