= Arthur Scargill =

British trade unionist (born 1938)

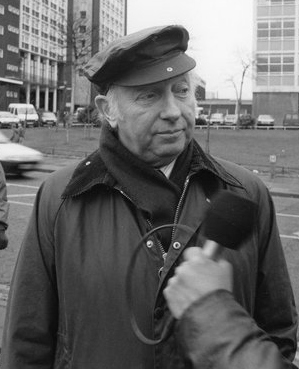
- Scargill in 1993

Deputy Leader of the Socialist Labour Party
- Incumbent
- Assumed office 2024
- Preceded by: Jim McDaid

Leader of the Socialist Labour Party
- In office 24 June 1996 – 2024
- Preceded by: Position established
- Succeeded by: Jim McDaid

President of the National Union of Mineworkers
- In office 1982–2002
- Preceded by: Joe Gormley
- Succeeded by: Ian Lavery

President of the Yorkshire Area of the National Union of Mineworkers
- In office 1974–1981
- Preceded by: Sam Bullough
- Succeeded by: Jack Taylor

Personal details
- Born: 11 January 1938 (age 88) Worsbrough Dale, West Riding of Yorkshire, England
- Party: Socialist Labour Party (since 1996)
- Other political affiliations: Labour Party (1962–1996)
- Spouse: Anne Harper (m. 1961; div. 2001)

Arthur Scargill (born 11 January 1938) is a British trade unionist who was President of the National Union of Mineworkers (NUM) from 1982 to 2002. He is best known for leading the 1984–1985 United Kingdom miners' strike, a major event in the history of the British labour movement.

Joining the NUM at the age of 19 in 1957, Scargill was one of its leading activists by the late 1960s. He led an unofficial strike in 1969, and played a key organising role during the strikes of 1972 and 1974, the latter of which played a part in the downfall of Edward Heath's Conservative government.

Thereafter Scargill led the NUM through the 1984–1985 miners' strike. It turned into a confrontation with the Conservative government of Margaret Thatcher in which the miners' union was defeated. Initially a Young Communist League member, then a Labour Party member, Scargill is now deputy leader of the Socialist Labour Party (SLP), having founded the party in 1996 and served as its leader from the party's foundation until 2024.

== Early life ==
Scargill was born in Worsbrough Dale near Barnsley, West Riding of Yorkshire. His father, Harold (died 1989), was a miner and a member of the Communist Party of Great Britain. His mother, Alice (née Pickering), was a professional cook. He did not take the Eleven-Plus exam and went to Worsbrough Dale School (now called the Elmhirst School). He left school in 1953 at fifteen years old to work as a coal miner at Woolley Colliery, where he worked for nineteen years.

== Early political and trade union activities ==
Scargill recalled how after becoming a miner, the poor working conditions and "people who should never have been working, having to work to live ... on that first day I promised myself I would try one day to get things changed". He joined the Young Communist League in 1955, becoming its Yorkshire District chair in 1956 and shortly after a member of its National Executive Committee. In 1957 he was elected NUM Yorkshire Area Youth Delegate, and attended the 6th World Festival of Youth and Students in Moscow as a representative of the Yorkshire miners. In 1958, he attended the World Federation of Trade Unions youth congress in Prague. In a 1975 interview with New Left Review Scargill said:

I was in the Young Communist League for about six or seven years and I became a member of its National Executive Committee responsible for industrial work. The secretary at this time was a very good friend of mine called Jimmy Reid, and we're still close friends. A lot of other people on the National Executive at that time went on and became very respectable Labour MPs in Parliament. Many of us started in the 1950s in the Young Communist League. So that was my initial introduction into socialism and into political militancy. My father was a Communist. My mother was strictly non-political. But my father never forced me to be involved in politics at all.

In 1961, Scargill was elected a member of the Woolley NUM Branch Committee. Scargill joined the Labour Party in 1962. He regularly attended Workers' Educational Association (WEA) classes and Co-operative Party educational programmes, and in 1962, undertook a three-year, part-time course at the University of Leeds, where he studied economics, industrial relations and social history. In 1965 he was elected branch delegate from Woolley to the Yorkshire NUM Area Council, and in 1969 was elected a member of the Yorkshire NUM Area Executive Committee. Although he never worked at Barrow Colliery in his home village, he was involved in the politics of the branch, where the membership was much more left-wing than in the conservative Woolley Colliery. In 1970, he was elected a member of the regional committee of the Co-operative Retail Services in Barnsley and a delegate to its national conference. He also represented the Barnsley Co-op at Cooperative congresses.

Scargill opposed civilian nuclear power and, during the first Wilson ministry, became highly critical of the government's energy policy. Following a Labour Party conference speech on energy policy by Richard Marsh in July 1967, Scargill said:

I can honestly say that I never heard flannel like we got from the Minister ... he said that we have nuclear power stations with us, whether we like it or not. I suggest to this Conference that we have coal mines with us ... but they did something about this problem: they closed them down. This was a complete reversal of the policy... that was promised by the Labour Government before it was put into office ... this represents a betrayal of the mining industry.

Scargill became involved in the Yorkshire Left, a group of left-wing activists involved in the Yorkshire region of the NUM, its largest region. He played an important role in the miners' strike of 1972 and was involved in the mass picket at Saltley Gate in Birmingham.

== National Union of Mineworkers ==
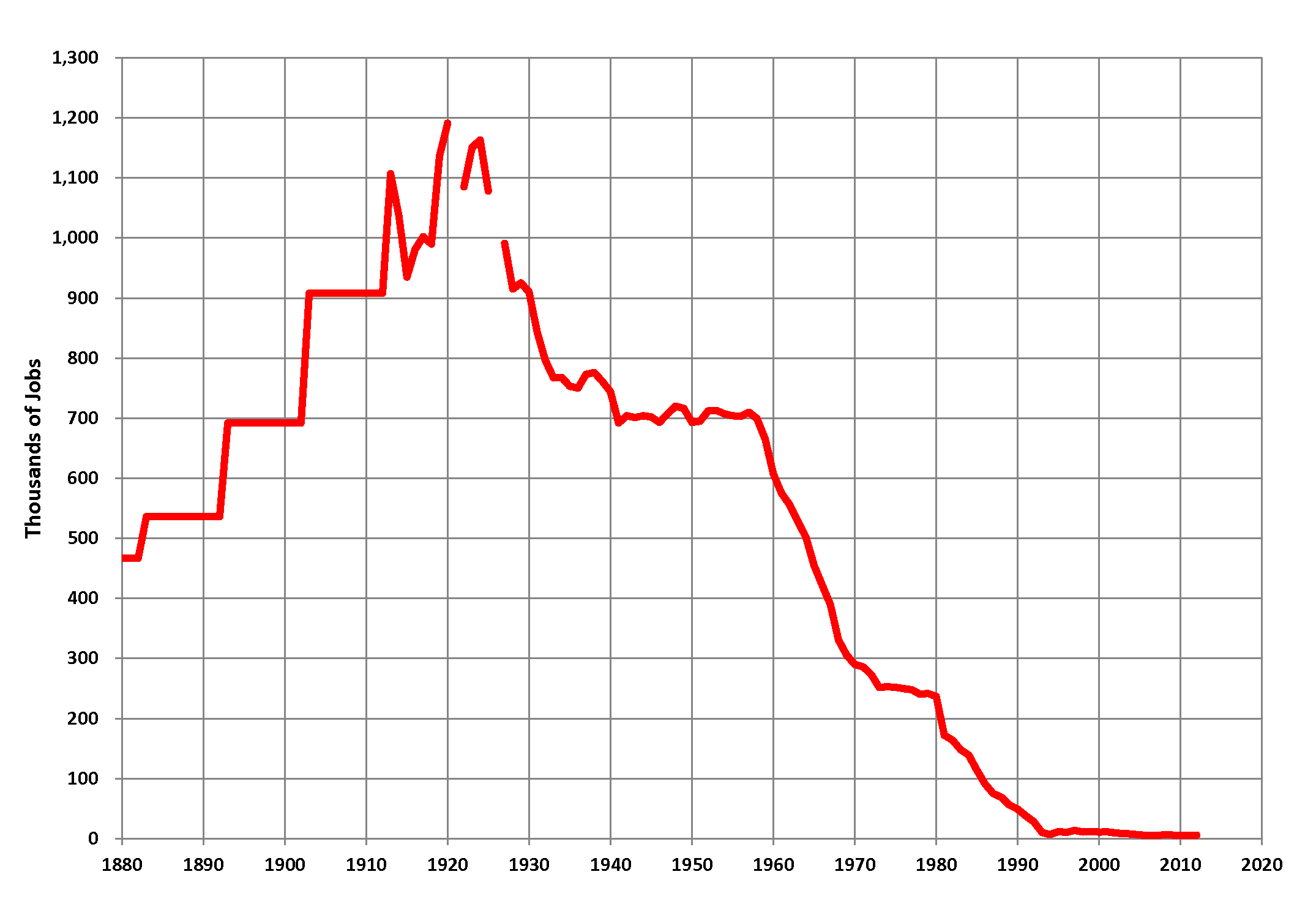
Coal mining employment in the UK, 1880–2012 (DECC data)

Scargill was a leader of the unofficial strike in 1969, which began in Yorkshire and spread across the country. He had challenged Sam Bullough, the president of the Yorkshire area NUM, to act on the working hours of surface workers, given that the union's conference had passed a resolution that their hours be shortened the previous year. When Bullough (unwell at the time) attempted to rule Scargill as "out of order", he was voted out by the area's delegates and a strike was declared across Yorkshire on the issue. Scargill saw this strike as a turning point in the union's attitude to militancy.

Scargill's major innovation was organising "flying pickets" involving hundreds or thousands of committed strikers who could be bussed to critical strike points to shut down a target. He gained fame for using the tactic to win the Battle of Saltley Gate in 1972, and made it his main tactical device in the 1984 strike. By 1984 however the police were ready and neutralised the tactic with superior force.

In 1973, Scargill was elected to the full-time post of compensation agent in the Yorkshire NUM. (The Yorkshire Left had already decided to stand him as their candidate even before the strike.) Scargill won widespread applause for his response to the disaster at Lofthouse Colliery in Outwood, West Yorkshire, at which he accompanied the rescue teams underground and was on site for six days with the relatives of the seven deceased. At the subsequent enquiry, he used notebooks of underground working from the 19th century, retrieved from the Institute of Geological Sciences in Leeds, to argue that the National Coal Board could have prevented the disaster had they acted on the information available. This performance strengthened his popularity with the Yorkshire miners.

A few months later, the president of the Yorkshire NUM died unexpectedly, and Scargill won the election for his replacement; the two posts were then combined and he held them until 1981. During this time, he earned the esteem of significant sections of the left and the British working class, who saw him as honest, hard-working and genuinely concerned with their welfare, and he was also respected for improving the administration of the compensation agent's post. In 1974, he was instrumental in organising the miners' strike that led Prime Minister Edward Heath to call a February general election.

Scargill was involved in a High Court case in 1978 that set a precedent in UK labour law, known as Roebuck v NUM (Yorkshire Area) No 2. The judge Sir Sydney Templeman held that it was unlawful that union members were disciplined by the NUM disciplinary panel, which Scargill chaired, for appearing as witnesses testifying against Scargill in a libel case.

In the 1981 election for NUM president, Scargill secured around 70% of the vote. One of the main planks of his platform was to give more power to union conferences than to executive meetings, on the grounds that the former were more democratic. This had great implications for regional relations in the NUM; the executive was described as dominated by "Gormley's rotten boroughs", since every region – even quite small ones – had one delegate, and the larger regions had only a few more (Scotland and South Wales had two delegates each, Yorkshire had three).

Scargill had, before becoming president, favoured moving the head office of the NUM out of London, which he described as a "prostituting place". A motion from the Kent area was passed by the NUM conference to move the head office to a coalfield. Scargill subsequently decided to move to Sheffield, and said that he had spoken to each member of staff to ask them to move to Sheffield. The staff at headquarters issued a press statement in January 1983 to deny this and to list twelve grievances against Scargill's treatment of his staff. The section under "staff procedures" details how Scargill monitored head office staff:

Mr. Scargill's vendetta against Head Office staff has at times descended to the most puerile and paranoic [sic] levels. The names of all incoming telephone callers are recorded on a central log. A secret record is kept of the time at which all workers arrive and leave each day. Written authorization is required for the purchase of tea and coffee. Staff members suddenly taken ill, or with long-standing medical appointments, require his personal consent to be absent from the office.

The vast majority of head-office staff took redundancy rather than move to Sheffield.

Scargill was a very vocal opponent of Thatcher's Conservative government, frequently appearing on television to attack it. On the appointment of Ian MacGregor as head of the NCB in 1983, Scargill stated, "The policies of this government are clear – to destroy the coal industry and the NUM". However, Scargill's statements in the years after becoming NUM president divided left-wing opinion with his support of the Soviet Union, most notably when he refused to support the TUC's positions on the Solidarity union in Poland or on the Soviet shooting down of the Korean Air Lines Flight 007. One branch of the NUM, at Annesley in Nottinghamshire, put forward a vote of no confidence in Scargill in autumn 1983 following his comments on these matters, but Scargill defeated this at a December meeting and won a vote of confidence instead.

=== Miners' strike ===
The government announced on 6 March 1984 its intention to close 20 coal mines, revealing as well the plan in the long-term to close over 70 pits. Scargill led the union in the 1984–1985 miners' strike. He claimed that the government had a long-term strategy to destroy the industry by closing unprofitable pits, and that it listed pits it wanted to close each year. This was denied by the government at the time, although papers released in 2014 under the thirty-year rule suggest that Scargill was right.

Miners were split between those who supported the strike and those who opposed it (see Union of Democratic Mineworkers). Scargill never balloted NUM members for a strike; this was seen as an erosion of democracy within the union, but the role of ballots in decision-making had been made very unclear after previous leader, Joe Gormley, had ignored two ballots over wage reforms, and his decisions had been upheld after appeals to court were made. The NUM had previously held three ballots on a national strike, all of which rejected the proposal: 55% voted against in January 1982, and 61% voted against in both October 1982 and March 1983. Scargill publicly ruled out allowing a national ballot on 12 April 1984.

The media characterised the strike as "Scargill's strike" and his critics accused him of looking for an excuse for industrial action since becoming union president. There was some controversy in February 1985 when Times journalist Paul Routledge engaged the Queen in discussion on the strike, and the Queen said that the strike was "all about one man", which Routledge objected to. Many politicians, including the then Labour leader Neil Kinnock, believed Scargill had made a huge mistake in calling the strike in the summer rather than in the winter. Scargill was often accompanied by his then wife Anne Harper to speak at picket lines and to media appearances; Harper was simultaneously involved in founding and leading the Women Against Pit Closures movement.

The strike ended on 3 March 1985 following an NUM vote to return to work. It was a defining moment in British industrial relations, and its defeat significantly weakened the trade union movement. It was a major political victory for Prime Minister Margaret Thatcher and the Conservative Party. The strike became a symbolic struggle, as the NUM was one of the strongest unions in the country, viewed by many, including Conservatives in power, as having brought down the Heath government in the union's 1974 strike. Unlike the strikes in the 1970s, the later strike ended with the miners' defeat and the Thatcher government was able to consolidate its fiscally conservative programme. The political power of the NUM and of most British trade unions was severely reduced.

==== Assessments ====
Some historians have provided interpretations and explanations of the defeat.

- Robert Taylor depicts Scargill as an 'industrial Napoleon' who called a strike 'at the wrong time' on the 'wrong issue', and adopted strategies and tactics that were 'impossibilist', with 'an inflexible list of extravagant non-negotiable demands' that amounted to 'reckless adventurism' that was 'a dangerous, self-defeating delusion'.
- Some scholars have concluded that Scargill's decisive tactical error was to substitute his famous flying picket for the holding of a national strike ballot. His policy alienated most of the Nottinghamshire miners, undermined his position with the leaders of the trade union movement, hurt the union's reputation in British public opinion, and led to violence along the picket line. That violence strengthened the stature of the Coal Board and the Thatcher government.
- Political journalist Andrew Marr argues that:

Many found Scargill inspiring; many others found him frankly scary. He had been a Communist and retained strong Marxist views and a penchant for denouncing anyone who disagreed with him as a traitor... Scargill had indeed been elected by a vast margin and he set about turning the NUM's once moderate executive into a reliably militant group... By adopting a position that no pits should be closed on economic grounds, even if the coal was exhausted – more investment would always find more coal, and from his point of view, the losses were irrelevant – he made sure confrontation would not be avoided. Exciting, witty Arthur Scargill brought coalmining to a close in Britain far faster than would have happened had the NUM been led by some prevaricating, dreary old-style union hack.

- In a book published by the National Coal Mining Museum for England, David John Douglass writes that Scargill's responsibility for the 1984–1985 strike is often exaggerated:

There is a prevailing view that Arthur Scargill, the NUM National President, called the strike. He did not. The strike started in Yorkshire, and he was not present at the delegate Council meeting in Barnsley. He had no means of calling a strike in Yorkshire.

In January 2014, the Prime Minister, David Cameron stated, "I think if anyone needs to make an apology for their role in the miners' strike it should be Arthur Scargill for the appalling way that he led the union." This was in the Prime Minister's rejection of Labour calls for an apology for government actions during the 1984–1985 miners' strike. His comments followed a question in the Commons from Labour MP Lisa Nandy, who said the miners and their families deserved an apology for the mine closures.

== Later years ==
Scargill, along with veteran left-wing Labour MP Tony Benn, campaigned to free strikers Russell Shankland and Dean Hancock from prison. The two men had been convicted of the killing of David Wilkie, a taxi driver, by throwing a block of concrete from a bridge onto his car. Scargill had condemned the killing at the time. Shankland's and Hancock's life sentences for murder were reduced to eight years for manslaughter on appeal. They were released from prison in November 1989.

Following the miners' strike, Scargill was elected to lifetime presidency of the NUM by an overwhelming national majority, in a controversial election in which some of the other candidates claimed that they were given very little time to prepare. He stepped down from leadership of the NUM at the end of July 2002, to become the honorary president. He was succeeded by Ian Lavery.

=== Accusations of financial impropriety ===
In 1990, Scargill was accused in a series of Daily Mirror articles and ITV's The Cook Report of mishandling money donated for the striking miners during the 1984–1985 strike, with many of the sources being those who had previously worked with him in the NUM such as Kim Howells, Jim Parker and Roger Windsor. It was alleged that, of the money donated from Libya, Scargill took £29,000 for his own bridging loan and £25,000 for his home in Yorkshire, but gave only £10,000 to the striking Nottinghamshire miners. In addition, it was alleged that he had taken £1,000,000 of cash donated by the Soviet Union for the Welsh miners and placed it in a Dublin bank account for the "International Miners' Organisation", where it stayed until a year after the strike had finished. There was much criticism of Scargill within the NUM from the Welsh and Scottish areas, who briefly considered splitting from the NUM.

An internal NUM report by Gavin Lightman QC found that Scargill had used some of the Libyan money to pay for improvements to his bungalow but not to pay off his mortgage (as had been alleged), and stated that Scargill's failure to make a full report on the Soviet money donated for the Welsh miners was "a remarkable breach of duty" and that he should pay the money back to the NUM. Scargill accepted Lightman's statement that many of his actions suffered from a lack of professional advice, which he was unwilling to be bound by.

In July 1990, the NUM executive voted unanimously to sue Scargill and general secretary Peter Heathfield. Negotiations between Scargill and the NUM took place in France. Airport staff at Leeds Bradford Airport identified Scargill attempting to travel under a false name (Arthur Fenn) wearing a disguise on 20 July, and turned him away to purchase a genuine ticket with his true identity. In September 1990, the Certification Officer brought criminal charges against Scargill and Heathfield for wilfully neglecting to perform the union's duty to keep proper accounting records. Scargill reached an agreement to repay money to the NUM shortly after this. The prosecution brought by the Certification Officer was rejected in July 1991 on the grounds that it would be inappropriate to use the material provided in confidence to Lightman's enquiry.

The South Wales area leader, Des Dutfield, moved that Scargill should stand down and face re-election, but the motion was defeated.

Film director Ken Loach subsequently made "The Arthur Legend" as part of Channel 4's Dispatches series. The documentary suggests that the claims against Scargill were untrue. The editor of the Daily Mirror at the time, Roy Greenslade, wrote an article in The Guardian in May 2002 to apologise to Scargill for the false claims about paying off the mortgage and for putting too much trust in Roger Windsor, who at the time had still not repaid the £29,500 that he had taken from the Miners' Welfare Fund and that the Lightman Report had asked that he repay.

During the media controversy, the antiperspirant Mitchum used Scargill's image, without his consent, under the slogan "Mitchum, for when you're really sweating!" Scargill complained to the Advertising Standards Authority who criticised the advertisement as "highly distasteful".

=== Legal disputes ===
In 1993, Scargill tried to use Thatcher's flagship Right to Buy scheme to buy a flat on the Barbican Estate in central London. His application was refused because the flat in the Barbican Estate's Shakespeare Tower was not Scargill's primary residence. Former Scargill loyalist Jimmy Kelly, a miner at the Edlington Main pit near Doncaster in the 1980s, said he was astonished to learn of the attempt to buy the flat. "It's so hypocritical it's unreal," he said. "It was Thatcher's legislation, actually giving council tenants the Right to Buy their own houses. I think if it had been made public before then there'd have been a huge outcry. I think people would be astounded if they knew that."

On 25 August 2010, it was reported that Scargill had been told that he no longer qualified for full membership of the NUM under union rules that he had helped draw up, but was only eligible for "life", "retired" or "honorary" membership, none of which carried voting rights. In February 2012, Scargill won £13,000 in a court action against the NUM, primarily for car expenses, and for the earlier temporary denial of membership.

Scargill admitted there was 'bad blood' between him and the NUM general secretary Chris Kitchen, who said, "I honestly do believe that Arthur, in his own world, believes that the NUM is here to afford him the lifestyle that he's become accustomed to." However, in December 2012, Scargill lost a similar case concerning rent on his flat in the Barbican, London. In 2012, the flat was valued at £1.5 million, and had 24/7 access to concierge services.

For years the NUM had been paying £34,000 annual rent for the flat on Scargill's instructions, without the knowledge of NUM members or many senior officials; Scargill claimed the NUM should continue funding his flat for the rest of his life, and thereafter for any widow who survived him. Chris Kitchen said: "I would say it's time to walk away, Mr Scargill. You've been found out. The NUM is not your personal bank account and never will be again." Kitchen says that Scargill "has had 30 years of decent living out of the union, and he's got a pension that's second to none. Had he done the humble thing and walked away with what he were entitled to, his reputation would still be intact... I've always said that if Arthur can no longer control the NUM, he'll try and destroy it. That's what I believe".

=== Socialist Labour Party and retirement ===
In 1996, Scargill founded the Socialist Labour Party after the Labour Party abandoned the original wording of Clause IV – advocating the public democratic ownership of key industries and utilities – from their constitution. He has contested two parliamentary elections. In the 1997 general election, he ran against Alan Howarth, a defector from the Conservative Party to Labour, who had been given the safe seat of Newport East to contest. In the 2001 general election, he ran against Peter Mandelson in Hartlepool. He lost on both occasions, winning 5.2% of the vote in Newport East and then 2.4% of the vote in Hartlepool. In May 2009, he was a candidate for the Socialist Labour Party for one of London's seats in the European Parliament.

After stepping down from leadership of the NUM, Scargill became active in the UK's Stalin Society saying the "ideas of Marx, Engels, Lenin and Stalin explain the real world". In an address to members in 2000, Scargill celebrated the October Revolution, saying, "I am sick and tired of listening to the so-called 'experts' today who still criticise the Soviet Union and, in particular, Stalin." Scargill criticised Poland's Solidarity calling it an "anti-socialist organisation which desires the overthrow of a socialist state", which Scargill saw as deformed but reformable.

The Guardian in February 2014 said that Scargill had become a recluse. He was not attending any of the events to commemorate the thirtieth anniversary of the 1984 strike at the NUM. Following Margaret Thatcher's death in April 2013, ITN made Scargill several offers for a five-minute interview, with the final offer reaching £16,000, but Scargill refused all the offers and did not speak to any media organisation.

Scargill still occasionally gives interviews and makes appearances. An article published in The Times in August 2015 stated that Scargill had spoken to the Bakers, Food and Allied Workers Union conference in June 2015, and that he was due to appear alongside Jeremy Corbyn at the Orgreave Truth & Justice Campaign in September 2015. He gave a rare television interview to ITV News at that time.

In 2017, Scargill spoke at an event in Cardiff setting out how British manufacturing could be rebuilt after Britain had left the European Union. He called for the cotton mills, steel plants and mines to be re-opened and that under EU rules, the government had not been able to subsidise the coal mines. He also stated regarding Brexit that "we should just invoke the first clause of Article 50 – and that means we could leave the EU tomorrow".

In July 2021, Scargill spoke at the Rebel Town Festival in Jarrow. Scargill supported the 2022 United Kingdom railway strike, joining an RMT picket line in Wakefield on 21 June 2022. Scargill's appearance on the picket line was alluded to by Prime Minister Boris Johnson the next day at Prime Minister's Questions, accusing the Labour Party of "literally holding hands with Arthur Scargill".

== Personal life ==
On 16 September 1961, Scargill married Anne Harper at Gawber Parish Church. They moved in with Scargill's father, Harold, who lived with them until his death in 1989. Their daughter Margaret was born in 1962; she later became a general practitioner and married a colliery manager. Arthur and Anne Scargill separated in 1998 and divorced in 2001.

== Elections ==
UK Parliament elections

Date of election	Constituency	Party	Votes	%
1997	Newport East	SLP	1,952	5.2
2001	Hartlepool	SLP	912	2.4

London Assembly elections (entire London city)

Date of election	Party	Votes	%	Results	Notes
2000	SLP	17,401	1.0	Not elected	Multi-members party list

Welsh Assembly elections

Year	Region	Party	Votes	%	Result
2003	South Wales East	SLP	3,695	2.2	Not elected

European Parliament elections

Year	Region	Party	Votes	%	Result	Notes
1999	London	SLP	19,632	1.7	Not-elected	Multi-member constituency; party list
2009	London	SLP	15,306	0.9	Not-elected	Multi-member constituency; party list

Trade union offices
Preceded by Sam Bullough	President of the Yorkshire Area of the National Union of Mineworkers; 1974–1981	Succeeded by Jack Taylor
Preceded by Joe Gormley	President of the National Union of Mineworkers; 1982–2002	Succeeded by Ian Lavery
Preceded by François Duteil	President of the Trade Union International of Energy Workers; 1994–1998; With: François Duteil	Succeeded by Federation merged
