= Sándor Gáspár =

Sándor Gáspár may refer to:

- Sándor Gáspár (actor)
- Sándor Gáspár (politician)
