= Jan Konieczny =

Polish trade unionist and politician (born 1932)

Jan Konieczny (born 9 September 1932) is a Polish former trade unionist and politician.

Born in Rawicz, Konieczny became a coal-miner and joined the Polish United Workers' Party (PZPR) in 1951. He also joined the Miners' Trade Union, and in 1963 was the leader of the union at the Zabrze mine. In the late 1960s, he studied at the Mining Technical School, following which he began operating a coal-cutter in the mine. From 1976 until 1985, he served in the Sejm, representing the PZPR.

Konieczny also became the national president of the Miners' Trade Union. In 1981, he was additionally elected as president of the Trade Union International of Miners. He left his positions in 1985.

Trade union offices
Preceded by Jan Les	President of the Trade Union International of Miners; 1981–1985	Succeeded by François Duteil
