= Victorin Duguet =

French miner and trade unionist (1905–1989)

Ferdinand-Victorin Duguet (28 July 1905 – 10 October 1989) was a French trade union leader.

Born in Saint-Florent-sur-Auzonnet, Duguet followed in the family tradition of coal mining. He worked in the mines at Trélys-Le Martinet from 1918 until 1929, excepting one years' military service. He joined the National Federation of Miners (FNTSS), an affiliate of the General Confederation of Labour (CGT) in 1921, then the following year, was part of the split which formed the National Federation of United Miners, an affiliate of the United General Confederation of Labour (CGTU).

Duguet joined the French Communist Party (PCF) in 1928, and the following year, became the leader of the CGTU miners' union in the Gard. He wrote regularly for both the communist press, and the mining union journal, and this propelled him to prominence. In 1935, he was elected as general secretary of the National Federation of United Miners, and negotiated a merger with the FNTSS. This was completed in December, and Duguet became the deputy leader of the merged FNTSS, leading major strikes in 1936 and 1938.

Duguet opposed the Vichy regime, and in 1943 helped form an underground FNTSS. After the liberation of France, it was legalised, and he was elected as its general secretary. From 1945 to 1948, he also served on the executive of the CGT. In 1946, he became the first president of the Charbonnages de France, although he served just one year. From 1947 to 1950, he served on the Economic Council.

In 1955, Duguet stood down from the FNTSS, to become general secretary of the Trade Union International of Miners. He served until his retirement in 1965, and died in 1989.

Trade union offices
Preceded by Cyprien Quinet	General Secretary of the United National Federation of Miners; 1935–1936	Succeeded by Union merged
Preceded by Pierre Vigne	General Secretary of the National Federation of Miners; 1944–1955	Succeeded by Henri Martel
Preceded by Henri Turrel	General Secretary of the Trade Union International of Miners; 1955–1965	Succeeded by Lucien Labrune
