= Trade Union International of Banks, Insurance and Financial Unions Employees =

Trade union international for workers in the banking and insurance sector

The Trade Union International of Banks, Insurance and Financial Unions Employees (BIFU) is a trade union international for workers in the banking and insurance sector affiliated with the World Federation of Trade Unions.

The union was founded at a conference in New Delhi February 24-5, 2011. Its General Secretary is C.H. Venkatachalam of the All India Bank Employees Association (AIBEA). In 2021, its president was Likhtarovitch Alexander.
