= Enrique Pastorino =

Uruguayan politician and trade unionist

Enrique Pastorino (6 March 1918 – January 1995) was a Uruguayan trade union leader and communist politician.

Born in Montevideo, Pastorino worked variously in the packaging industry and in agriculture, before finding work in a shoe factory. He joined the leather workers' union, becoming its general secretary in 1941, and the following year, he also joined the Communist Party of Uruguay (CPU). He was elected to the CPU's central committee in 1947, and its executive committee in 1950. The following year, he was given responsibility for leading on trade union work in the party. From 1951 to 1959, he served as a national deputy.

In 1946, Pastorino moved to work for the General Workers' Union, with responsibility for organisation, then became its general secretary in 1950. In 1961, he became the secretary of the Central Council of Workers of Uruguay, serving until 1966, when he became the secretary of the Plenario Intersindical de Trabajadores – Convención Nacional de Trabajadores. Through his trade union work, he also became active in the World Federation of Trade Unions (WFTU), becoming a vice-president in 1957, and president in 1969.

In 1973, Pastorino was awarded the International Lenin Prize. That year, he moved to Prague, due to the coup in Uruguay. He remained active in the WFTU, becoming its general secretary in 1978. He resigned from the post in 1980, without giving any explanation. In 1982, he was invited to attend the WFTU congress to be awarded a gold medal, but he did not do so, and he did not take his pension from the organisation.

Trade union offices
| Preceded by Renato Bitossi | President of the World Federation of Trade Unions; 1969–1978 | Succeeded by Sándor Gáspár |
| Preceded by Pierre Gensous | General Secretary of the World Federation of Trade Unions; 1978–1980 | Succeeded by Ibrahim Zakaria |
