= Henri Turrel =

Henri Albert Turrel (10 July 1910 – 20 August 1962) was a French trade unionist and communist activist.

== Biography ==
Born in Susville, Turrel's father died in a mine accident when Henri was just six years old. He left school at the age of twelve, to work on a farm, then at sixteen began working at the mine in La Mure.

Turrel joined the Communist Youth along with some other miners, and they built up a union branch affiliated to United National Federation of Miners, part of the United General Confederation of Labour (CGTU). In 1935, he stood for the French Communist Party in the municipal elections in Susville, and was elected, but disqualified because he was not yet 25 years old.

In 1936, the CGTU merged into the General Confederation of Labour (CGT), and Turrel was elected to the executive of its National Federation of Miners (FNTSS). He also came to prominence in the PCF, and in 1938 became its secretary for the Isère, Savoie and Hautes-Alpes region.

In August 1939, Turrel was arrested and sentenced to three months in prison for his PCF activities. During this period he was given a further sentence of two months, but was then released to serve in the military. On demobilisation, he returned to La Mure, but was not hired, and instead took work as a smith, before working full-time for the communist resistance.

From late 1940 Turrel was a liaison between difference regions of the resistance, then led propaganda efforts in the southern region. He was arrested in October 1941 and sentenced to life in prison, moving around prisons in France before being deported to Dachau.

Turrel was released at the end of World War II, and returned to La Mure once more, being appointed as the deputy secretary of the FNTSS in Isère. He stood unsuccessfully for the PCF in Parliamentary election of 1945, but his superior in the FNTSS was elected, and Turrel was promoted, then early in 1946, he was appointed as national secretary of the FNTSS.

In 1947, Turrel was appointed as manager of the central school run by the CGT, then in 1950, he was elected as the first general secretary of the Trade Union International of Miners. He moved to Vienna, but was diagnosed with lung cancer, and had to stand down in 1955. He returned to La Mure and ran a cafe until 1960, when his illness forced him to also give that up.

Trade union offices
Preceded by New position	General Secretary of the Trade Union International of Miners; 1950–1955	Succeeded by Victorin Duguet
