= Ibrahim Zakaria (trade unionist) =

Sudanese trade unionist and activist

Ibrahim Zakaria (17 March 1929 – 2 November 1993) was a Sudanese trade unionist and communist activist.

== Early life and career ==
Born in northern Sudan to a peasant family, Zakaria studied at the Atbara Technical School and found work on the country's railways. He joined a trade union, and became a leading founder of the Sudanese Workers' Trade Union Federation. In 1946, he was a founding member of the Sudanese Communist Party, serving as its first organiser, and also on the party's Colonial Committee. In 1957, Zakaria moved to Prague, to work for the World Federation of Trade Unions (WFTU), as its secretary for Africa. This was an important role, as, due to the independence movements in many countries, the WFTU hoped to gain new affiliates in Africa and see existing affiliates grow. In 1973, he played a leading role in establishing the Organisation of African Trade Union Unity. In 1980, Zakara became Acting General Secretary of the WFTU, and he was appointed to the post on a permanent basis in 1982. In this post, he represented the organisation to the United Nations and the International Labour Organization. In 1990, Zakaria moved to become president of the WFTU. He died in 1993, in Prague.

Trade union offices
Preceded by Enrique Pastorino	General Secretary of the World Federation of Trade Unions; 1982–1990	Succeeded by Alexander Zharikov
Preceded by Indrajit Gupta	President of the World Federation of Trade Unions; 1990–1993	Succeeded by Antonio Neto
