= Trade Union International of Textile-Garment-Leather =

The Trade Union International of Textile-Garment-Leather (TUI TEXGAL) is a sectoral federation affiliated to the World Federation of Trade Unions.

The federation was established on 6 March 2020, at a conference held in Cairo, organised by the General Union of Textile and Garment Workers of Egypt. Unions present at the conference were from India, Bangladesh, Pakistan, Sri Lanka, Kazakhstan, Russia, Egypt, the Democratic Republic of Congo, Sudan, Morocco, Lebanon, Palestine, Iraq, Jordan, Syria, Brazil, Argentina, Greece and Cyprus. An earlier federation, the Trade Union International of Textile, Leather and Fur Workers Unions, merged into the Trade Union International of Agroalimentary, Food, Commerce, Textile & Allied Industries in 1997.

Abdel-Fatah Ibrahim, of Egypt, was elected as the federation's first general secretary, while Ernesto Trigo of Argentina was elected as president. The federation agreed to hold an annual International Action Day on 24 April, to commemorate the victims of the Rana Plaza fire.
