= Trade Union International of Pensioners and Retired Persons =

The Trade Union International of Pensioners and Retired Persons (Spanish: Pensionistas y Jubilad@s, PyJ) is an sectoral federation affiliated to the World Federation of Trade Unions.

The international was established in 2014, and is based in Barcelona. It held its second congress in 2019 in Colombia, and planned to hold five regional conferences in 2021. As of 2020, it was led by president Dimos Koumpouris of Greece, and general secretary Quim Boix of Spain.
