= Industrial Union of Metal =

The Industrial Union of Metal (German: Industriegewerkschaft Metall, IG Metall) was a trade union representing workers in the metal and electronic industries in East Germany.

The union was founded on 13 June 1946, in the Soviet occupation zone of Germany. By the end of the month, it had 421,558 members, making it the largest component of the new Free German Trade Union Federation (FDGB). In 1951, metallurgical workers were moved into a new Industrial Union of Metallurgy, but in 1958 they returned. In recognition of this, the union was renamed the Industrial Union of Metal and Metallurgy, but the following year, it returned to its former, shorter, name.

Internationally, the union was an affiliate of the Trade Union International of Workers in the Metal Industry. The union was also involved in sports associations, initially called SV Mechanik, and later, SV Motor, as seen in SV Motor Altenburg.

The union continued to grow, and by January 1989, it had 1,819,356 members, 18.9% of all FDGB members. In December 1989, it signed a co-operation agreement with the West German IG Metall, and in April 1990, it became an independent union. However, in May, the West German union's attitude changed, and it decided instead to set up its own branches in East Germany. As a result, at the end of the year, the East German union dissolved, asking its members to join the West German union as individuals, about 900,000 doing so.

== Presidents ==
1946: Paul Peschke
1949: Fritz Philipp
1950: Emil Otto
1952: Hans Schmidt
1953: Rolf Berger
1957: Herbert Dönitz
1960: Rolf Berger
1961: Reinhard Sommer
1988: Gerhard Nennstiel
1989: Hartwig Bugiel
