= National Federation of Maritime Unions =

Trade union of France

The National Federation of Maritime Unions (French: Fédération nationale des syndicats maritimes, FNSM) is a trade union representing sailors in France.

The union was founded in 1905, and affiliated to the General Confederation of Labour (CGT). In 1921, the left wing of the union split away to join the United General Confederation of Labour (CGTU), while in 1926, another split formed The Sea Labourers union. This became the Autonomous Federation of Sea Workers, then rejoined the FNSM in 1929. Its former leader, Auguste Durand, became general secretary of the FNSM in 1931. The CGTU union rejoined the FNSM later in the decade, taking membership from 13,000 to a claimed 38,000. The union was banned during World War II, but reformed after the war, and in 1946 had 50,000 members.

In 1947, the right wing of the union split away, led by Pierre Ferri-Pisani, to join Workers' Force.

== General Secretaries ==
1931: Auguste Durand
1945: André Fressinet
1949: Augustin Gruénais
1975:
1990s: Alain Merlet
2010s: Michel Le Cavorzin
2019: Pierrick Samson
