= François Duteil =

François Duteil (born 21 June 1944) is a French trade unionist and political activist.

Born in Poilley, Manche, Duteil trained as thermal engineer, then undertook compulsory military service in the French Air Force. In 1965, he began working at the power station in Saint-Ouen-sur-Seine, joining the National Federation of Energy (FNE) trade union. The following year, he joined the French Communist Party (PCF).

Duteil rapidly came to prominence in the union movement, and by the end of 1967 was the head of the power station's union branch, served on the secretariat of the General Confederation of Labour (CGT) in Saint-Ouen and the executive committee of the CGT in Seine-Saint-Denis. During the events of May 1968, he led an occupation of the power station.

In 1971, Duteil became the head of the union's national youth section, serving on its national executive from 1972, and its federal secretariat from 1975. He moved to become the FNE's organisation secretary, then in 1979 was elected as general secretary of the union. In 1982, he was finally elected to the bureau of the CGT. In 1981, he became head of the Advisory Coordinating Committee of European Energy Unions, and in 1985, he was elected as president of the Trade Union International of Energy Workers. The same year, he was also elected to the central committee of the PCF, and from 1987, sat on the party's political bureau.

Duteil stood down as leader of the FNE in 1989, but remained head of its political and industrial sections until 1992. That year, he became director of the Vie Ouvrière magazine. He became head of the new CGT Mines-Energy Institute of Social History in 2002, continuing in this post after leaving his remaining trade union positions in 2003.

Trade union offices
Preceded by Roger Pauwels	General Secretary of the National Federation of Energy; 1979–1989	Succeeded by Denis Cohen
Preceded by Jan Konieczny	President of the Trade Union International of Energy Workers; 1985–1998; With: Arthur Scargill (1994–1998)	Succeeded by Federation merged
