= Indrajit Gupta =

Indian politician (1919–2001)

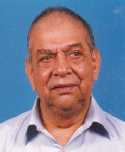

Union Minister of Home Affairs
- In office 29 June 1996 – 19 March 1998
- Prime Minister: H. D. Deve Gowda; I. K. Gujral
- Preceded by: H. D. Deve Gowda
- Succeeded by: L. K. Advani

President of World Federation of Trade Unions
- In office 1989–1990
- Preceded by: Sándor Gáspár
- Succeeded by: Ibrahim Zakaria

General Secretary of the Communist Party of India
- In office 1990–1996
- Preceded by: Chandra Rajeswara Rao
- Succeeded by: Ardhendu Bhushan Bardhan

Member of Parliament, Lok Sabha
- In office 27 November 1989 – 20 February 2001
- Preceded by: Narayan Choubey
- Succeeded by: Prabodh Panda
- Constituency: Midnapore, West Bengal
- In office 19 January 1980 – 27 November 1989
- Preceded by: Alhaj M.A.Hannan
- Succeeded by: Manoranjan Sur
- Constituency: Basirhat, West Bengal
- In office 1967–1977
- Preceded by: New Seat
- Succeeded by: Somnath Chatterjee
- Constituency: Alipore, West Bengal
- In office 1960–1967
- Preceded by: Biren Roy
- Succeeded by: Ganesh Ghosh
- Constituency: Calcutta South West

Personal details
- Born: 18 March 1919 Calcutta, Bengal Presidency, British India
- Died: 20 February 2001 (aged 81) Kolkata, West Bengal, India
- Party: Communist Party of India
- Spouse: Suraiya

Indrajit Gupta (18 March 1919 – 20 February 2001) was an Indian politician who belonged to the Communist Party of India (CPI). From 1996 to 1998, he served as Union Home Minister in the United Front governments of prime ministers H. D. Deve Gowda and I. K. Gujral. Since India's independence in 1947, the Home Ministry had banned the CPI three times, and many of its members, including Indrajit Gupta, were imprisoned or went underground for extended periods. Until he was surpassed by Atal Bihari Vajpayee in 2001, he was the longest-serving member of the Lok Sabha, (Note: Gupta was elected a record 11 times to the Lok Sabha, and was in office at his death in 2001. Vajpayee was elected to 10 terms in the Lok Sabha, also serving in the Rajya Sabha for two terms. P. M. Sayeed is the Lok Sabha MP with the longest uninterrupted tenure (36 years, 10 months and 21 days.)) having been elected eleven times. He suffered his only electoral reverse when he lost to Ashok Krishna Dutt in 1977 after the CPI supported Emergency.

== Early life ==
Gupta belonged to a Baidya family of Calcutta. His paternal grandfather, Behari Lal Gupta, ICS, was the Dewan of Baroda and his elder brother, Ranajit Gupta, ICS, was Chief Secretary of West Bengal. His father, Satish Chandra Gupta (c. 1877–7 September 1964), who belonged to the IA&AS was an Accountant General of India and retired as Secretary of the Central Legislative Assembly in 1933. After his schooling at Ballygunge Govt. High School, he went to Simla, where his father was posted, Gupta studied at St. Stephen's College, Delhi and later went to King's College, Cambridge. While studying in England he came under the influence of Rajani Palme Dutt and joined the communist movement. With a Tripos from the University of Cambridge he returned to Calcutta in 1938 to join the peasants' and workers' movement. He not only had to go to jail for his communist activities but was also sentenced to 'party jail' in 1948 for adopting a soft stand within the party. He went underground in India during 1948–50 when there was a crackdown on Communists.

== Parliamentarian ==
Gupta was elected to the Lok Sabha, the lower house of Parliament of India, for the first time in 1960, in a by-election. Thereafter, except for a short period from 1977 to 1980, he was a member till his death. In later years, as a result of his being the oldest member of the Lok Sabha he served as pro tem Speaker in 1996, 1998 and 1999. The office of pro tem Speaker is a ceremonial one mainly to conduct the swearing in of the newly elected members.

Gupta served on a number of parliamentary committees with distinction. He was chairman of the parliamentary standing committee on defence during 1995–1996 and was chairman of the committee on subordinate legislation from 1999 till his death. He was a member of the rules committee during 1990–1991, general purposes committee during 1985–1989 and from 1998 onwards; committee on defence from 1998–2000, committee on petitions during 1986–1987, business advisory committee from 1986–1987 and in 1989, library committee during 1990–1991 and the committee to review Lok Sabha Secretariat rules in 1990.

Gupta was conferred with the 'Outstanding Parliamentarian' Award in 1992. He served the Lok Sabha for 37 years till his death on 20 February 2001, and when he died President K.R. Narayanan paid a tribute, using three characteristics in his condolence message that suitably describes the man: "Gandhian simplicity, democratic outlook and deep commitment to values."

== Works ==
Capital and Labour in the Jute Industry and Self Reliance in National Defence

== Elections Contested ==
=== Lok Sabha ===
Year	Constituency	Party	Votes	%	Opponent	Opponent Party	Opponent Votes	%	Result	Margin	%
1999	Medinipur	CPI	446,545	48.60	Manoranjan Dutta	BJP	385,772	45.30	Won	60,773	3.30
1998	Medinipur	CPI	452,671	53.50	Manoranjan Dutta	BJP	177,512	20.60	Won	275,159	32.90
1996	Medinipur	CPI	488,569	56.30	Debaprasad Roy	INC	277,920	32.00	Won	210,649	24.30
1991	Medinipur	CPI	396,281	54.82	Birendra Bijoy Malladev	INC	232,758	31.70	Won	163,523	23.12
1989	Medinipur	CPI	428,260	57.15	Gouri Choubey	INC	295,940	39.49	Won	132,320	17.66
1984	Basirhat	CPI	315,444	51.90	Kamal Basu	INC	276,401	45.48	Won	39,043	6.42
1980	Basirhat	CPI	311,121	57.62	Abdul Gaffar Quazi	INC(I)	215,267	39.86	Won	95,854	17.76
1977	Dum Dum	CPI	193,986	45.97	Asoke Krishna Dutt	JP	215,766	51.13	Lost	-21,780	-5.16
1971	Alipore	CPI	173,795	49.00	Kamal Sarkar	CPI(M)	146,837	41.40	Won	26,958	7.60
1967	Alipore	CPI	121,694	32.41	P. Sarkar	INC	121,107	32.25	Won	587	0.16
1962	Calcutta South West	CPI	143,918	50.06	Ismail Ibrahim	INC	132,928	46.24	Won	10,990	3.82
1960	Calcutta South West (By-election)	CPI	71,548	52.87	A. K. Dutt	INC	58,235	43.03	Won	13,313	9.84

== Notes ==
Political offices
Preceded by H. D. Deve Gowda	Union Minister for Home Affairs of India; 1996–1998	Succeeded by Lal Krishna Advani
Trade union offices
Preceded by Sándor Gáspár	President of the World Federation of Trade Unions; 1989–1990	Succeeded by Ibrahim Zakharia
