= André Fressinet =

French Union leader

André Marius Fressinet
- Born: 29 February 1904; Dieulefit, France
- Died: 7 September 2004 (aged 100)
- Occupation: Trade union leader
- Organization(s): French Communist Party (PCF); CGT
- Known for: General secretary of the National Federation of Maritime Unions (FNSM); First general secretary of the Trade Union International of Transport, Port and Fishery Workers

André Marius Fressinet (29 February 1904 – 7 September 2004) was a French trade union leader.

== Biography ==
Born in Dieulefit, Fressinet began work at the age of 13 and joined the Union of Skins and Hides in Romans-sur-Isère, which was affiliated to the General Confederation of Labour (CGT). He also took part in demonstrations against World War I, but after the war, he completed his military service in the French Navy.

After military service, Fressinet returned to work, and joined the United General Confederation of Labour (CGTU), and the Communist Youth. In 1929, he moved to Marseille, and eventually found work in the merchant navy. He travelled regularly to East Asia, and was suspected by the French government of supporting the communist movement in French Indochina. He was sacked, but found work with other companies. In 1936, he was elected as the secretary of the sailors' section of the French Communist Party (PCF).

As a PCF member, Fressinet was arrested in 1940, but released two years later, and took part in the French resistance. He took various sectional and regional roles in the PCF, and helped reform the CGT's National Federation of Maritime Unions (FNSM). In 1945, he was elected as general secretary of the FNSM, and he was arrested during the strike of 1948. In 1949, he moved to become general secretary of the Trade Union International of Seamen and Dockers, in which role he was heavily involved in opposition to the Indochina War. He was jailed in 1950, convicted of illegally exercising a trade union mandate, and the international became inactive. Following some underground work, he moved to Gdynia in Poland and set up new headquarters there.

In 1953, the international merged with the Trade Union International of Land and Air Transport Workers, to form the Trade Union International of Transport, Port and Fishery Workers, based in Vienna. Fressinet was elected as its first general secretary, and relocated to Austria. In 1956, he moved back to Marseille, where he worked at the Ateliers du Canet, and remained active in the CGT and PCF.

Trade union offices
Preceded by Auguste Durand	General Secretary of the National Federation of Maritime Unions; 1945–1949	Succeeded by Augustin Gruénais
Preceded by New position	General Secretary of the Trade Union International of Seamen and Dockers; 1949–1953	Succeeded by Union merged
Preceded by New position	General Secretary of the Trade Union International of Transport, Port and Fishery Workers; 1953–1956	Succeeded by Rafael Avila Gonzalez
