= Stefan Ciołkowski =

Polish trade unionist and communist activist (1908–1970)

Stefan Ciołkowski (20 April 1908 – 7 June 1970) was a Polish trade unionist and communist activist.

Born in Lublin, Ciołkowski became a miner and joined the Communist Party of Poland. In 1924, he emigrated to France, where he joined the French Communist Party (PCF). He returned to Poland in 1931, then went to work at the Souvret colliery in Belgium in 1937. There, he joined the Communist Party of Belgium (PCB), and formed a mutual aid association for Poles.

On the outbreak of World War II, Ciołkowski returned to France, where he was active in the communist resistance. In October 1945, the PCF sent him to Belgium, where he served on the central committee of the PCB, with responsibility for organising the party among emigrant workers. However, at the start of 1946, he was expelled from the country, and returned to Poland. He joined the Polish Workers' Party, and was elected as its secretary in Szczecin.

Ciołkowski became prominent in the Association of Trade Unions (ZZZ), and in 1950 was appointed as the president of the new Trade Unions International of Miners, serving until about 1960. In the 1960s, he served as the ZZZ's Lublin Province chair.

Trade union offices
Preceded by New position	President of the Trade Unions International of Miners; 1950–c.1960	Succeeded by Michal Specjal
