= Ambroise Croizat =

French politician (1901–1951)

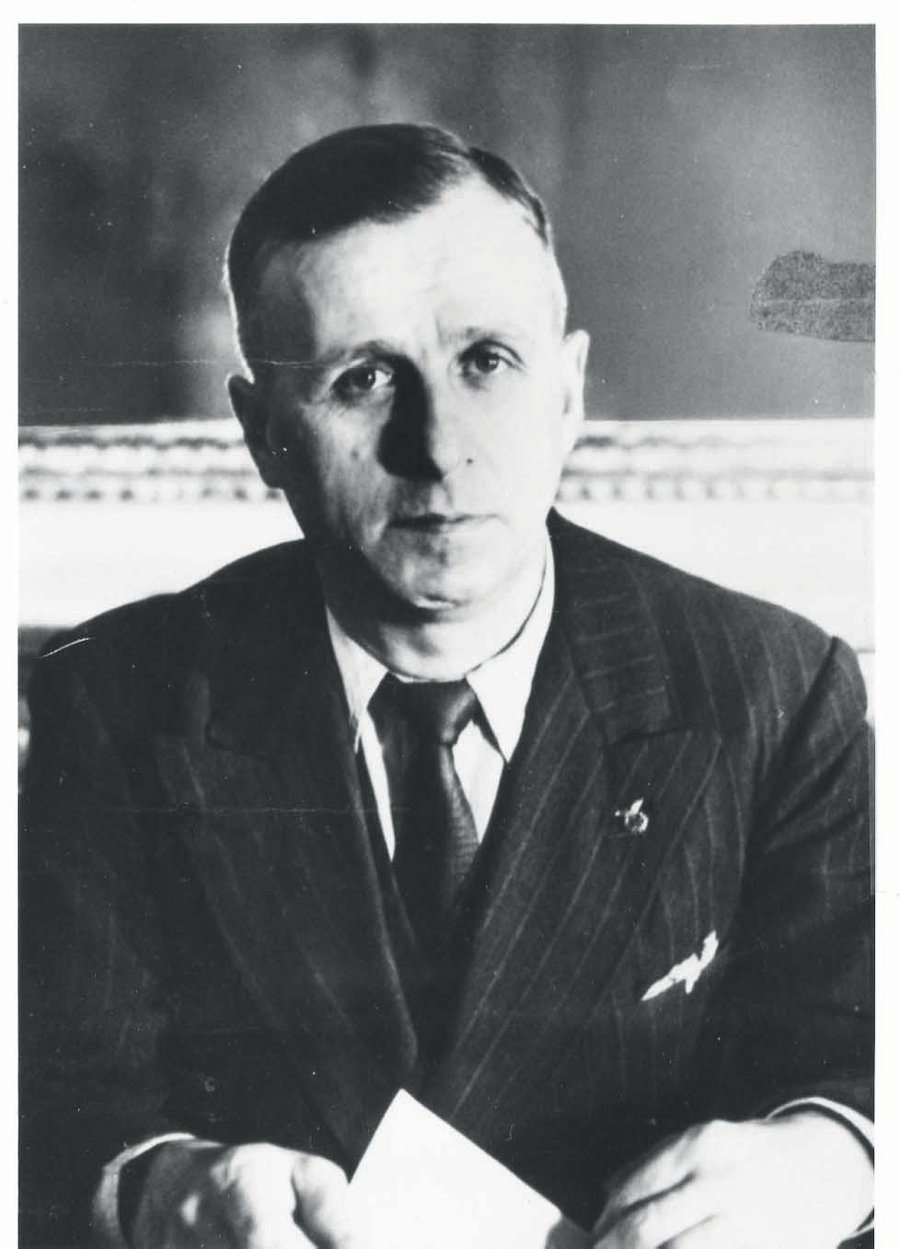
- Pictured at his Ministry of Labour office

Member of the National Assembly
- In office 6 November 1945 – 11 February 1951
- Parliamentary group: COM
- Constituency: Seine (1945-1946); Seine's 1st (1946-1951)
- In office 1 June 1936 – 9 July 1940
- Parliamentary group: COM
- Constituency: Seine

Minister of Labour
- In office 6 November 1945 – 26 January 1946
- President: Charles de Gaulle (head of the Provisional Government of the French Republic)
- Preceded by: Alexandre Parodi

Minister of Labour and Social security
- In office 26 January 1946 – 16 December 1946
- President: Félix Gouin (head of the Provisional Government of the French Republic); Georges Bidault (head of the Provisional Government of the French Republic)
- Succeeded by: Daniel Mayer
- In office 22 January 1947 – 4 May 1947
- President: Vincent Auriol
- Prime Minister: Paul Ramadier
- Succeeded by: Robert Lacoste (acting)

Personal details
- Born: 28 January 1901 Notre-Dame-de-Briançon, Savoie, France
- Died: 11 February 1951 (aged 50) Suresnes, France
- Party: PCF
- Profession: Adjuster and toolmaker

Ambroise Croizat (French pronunciation: [ɑ̃bʁwaz kʁwaza]; 28 January 1901 – 11 February 1951) was a French syndicalist and communist politician. As the minister of Labour and of Social security, he founded the French Social security system (or social safety net) and the retirement system, between 1945 and 1947. He was also the general secretary of the Fédération des travailleurs de la métallurgie CGT.

== Biography ==
=== Early life ===
His father, Antoine Croizat, was a blue-collar worker, and his mother, Louise Jeannette Piccino, was a weaver. Ambroise started working in a plant at the age of 13, when his father was drafted in 1914. As a metalworker trainee, he also followed evening classes, and became a toolmaker near Lyon.

=== Early politics ===
In 1917, Croizat joined the Young Socialist Movement, and then the Parti socialiste (French socialist party) in 1918. He began supporting the Section française de l'Internationale ouvrière (SFIO) in the Communist International. He participated in the great social movements of the metalworkers of the Lyon area. In 1920, he joined the Parti communiste, and became one of the leaders of Jeunesses communistes, a political youth organisation, from 1920 to 1928. In 1928, he was named secretary of the Fédération unitaire des métaux (French united federation of metalworkers). From 1929 – to his death in 1951 – he was a member of the central committee and of the bureau of the federated young communist movement. In 1936, he became general secretary of the Metalworkers' Federation, which then represented 20% of the total CGT members.

During the 1936 French legislative election, he was elected in the second division of the 14th district of Seine. He negotiated the Parisian metalworking convention, and, as a rapporteur, he presented the collective agreement to the Chamber.

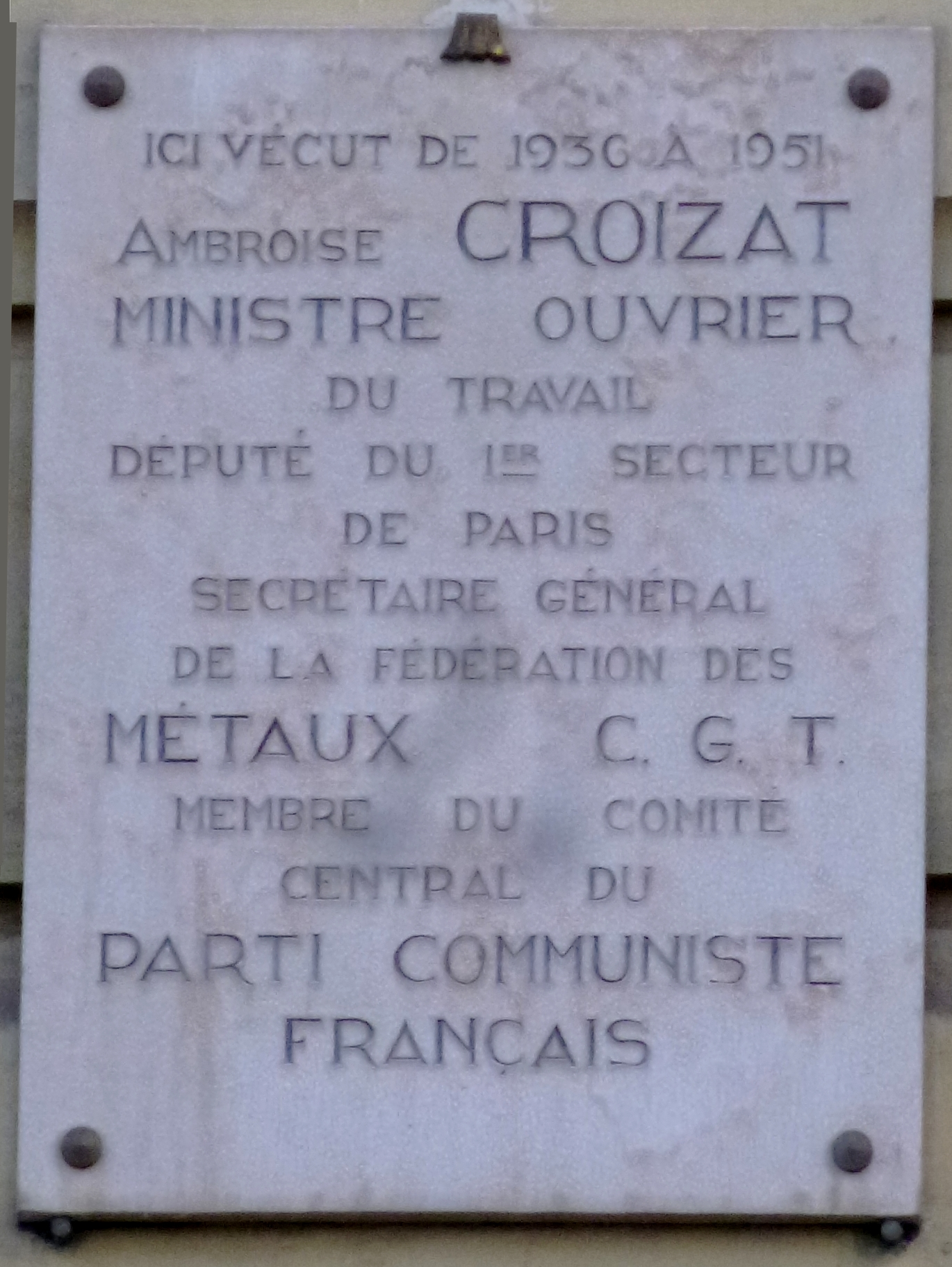
Plaque commemorating Ambroise Croizat at 79 Rue Daguerre in Paris

He was subsequently accused of "having participated in the creation and organisation of the Groupe ouvrier et paysan", and on the night of 7 October 1939, he was arrested. On 20 February 1940, he was ejected from the Legislature, and on 3 April 1940, he was sentenced to five years in prison, the loss of his civil and politic rights, and a fine of 4000 francs. After having been moved between 14 prisons, he was eventually detained during March 1941 in the bagne of Maison Carrée, near Alger. Freed on 5 February 1943, three months after Operation Torch, he was summoned by the CGT to be a member of the consultative commission of the interim government of Alger. After the Libération of France, he again served as an elected official, first in the two constitutive assemblies (voted on 21 October 1945 and 2 June 1946) and then in the National Assembly from 1946 to 1951.

Croizat served as Minister of Labour under the général de Gaulle from 21 November 1945 to 26 January 1946, and Minister of Labour and Social security from 26 January to 16 December 1946 (governments of Felix Gouin and Georges Bidault) and from 22 January to 4 May 1947 (government of Paul Ramadier, to the end of the communist participation in the government).

He participated in the foundation of the Social security system: health insurance, pension system, child benefit, and broad reform of French labour laws, through the creation of employee representative committees, occupational medicine, regulation of overtime, and a change of statute for miners.

=== Personal life ===
Croizat's first wife was Germaine Marie Girod (1902–1977). They divorced and, in 1939, he married Denise Mettetal (1912–1972), with whom he had two children (a daughter in March 1939, and a son in February 1940).

=== Death ===
In 1951, Croizat died of lung cancer. The Communist Party organized his funeral, with visitation at the Metalworkers House (now called Maison des métallos) at the CGT siege; historian Michel Étiévent later estimated that a million people attended. He was buried in Père Lachaise Cemetery.

== Contributions ==
Nicknamed the "ministre des travailleurs" (Minister of the workers), Ambroise Croizat is permanently associated with the major laws concerning Social security in France, notably the creation and administrative organisation of pension funds, and the special officials' treatment.

He also launched projects concerning employee representatives committees, staff representative's statute, collective agreements, prevention and compensation for workplace accidents, and family benefits.

== Government functions ==
- Minister of Labour under "le gouvernement de Charles de Gaulle" (2) (21 November 1945 – 26 January 1946)
- Minister of Labour and Social security under "le gouvernement de Félix Gouin" (26 January – 24 June 1946)
- Minister of Labour and Social security under "le gouvernement de Georges Bidault" (1) (24 June −16 December 1946)
- Minister of Labour and Social security under "le gouvernement de Paul Ramadier" (1) (22 January – 4 May 1947)

== Posterity ==
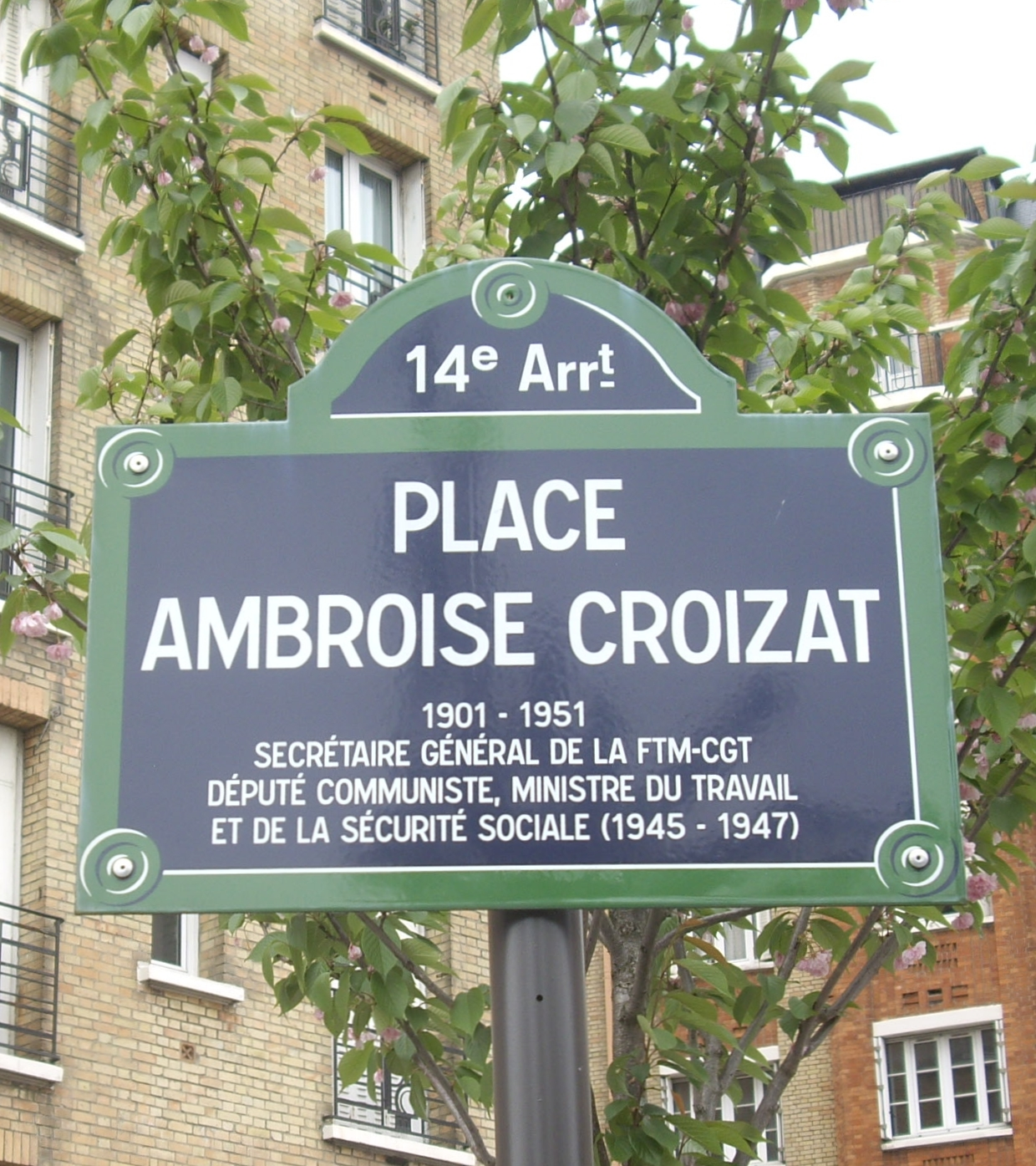
Plate on place Ambroise-Croizat, Paris, 14e arrondissement.

Multiple items have been named in Croizat's honor.

=== Streets ===
- Grand boulevard Ambroise Croizat, Venissieux (Rhône).
- City hall of Guyancourt on Ambroise Croizat street, (Yvelines).
- Ambroise Croizat street, Saint Michel de Maurienne (Savoie).
- Ambroise Croizat avenue, Saint-Martin-d'Hères (Isère).
- Ambroise Croizat crossroad, near the Cavale Blanche Hospital, Brest.
- Ambroise Croizat avenue, Lanester (Morbihan).
- Ambroise Croizat street, Saint-Denis (Seine-Saint-Denis).
- Ambroise Croizat street, Clermont-Ferrand.
- Ambroise Croizat street, Saint-Pierre-des-Corps.
- Ambroise Croizat street, Villejuif.
- Ambroise Croizat street, Varennes-Vauzelles.
- Ambroise Croizat street, Montlucon.

=== Buildings ===
- Ambroise Croizat Festival hall, Venissieux.
- Moûtiers' highschool in Tarentaise Valley, near a town close to where he was born.
- Vierzon's Ambroise Croizat retirement house.
- Angers' Ambroise Croizat university restaurant.
- Chambéry's Ambroise Croizat gymnasium.
- Imphy (Nièvre)'s Ambroise Croizat hall, part of Aperam metalwork factory.
- Saint-Michel-de-Maurienne (Savoie)'s Ambroise Croizat nursing home.
- Sainte-Tulle (Alpes de Haute Provence)'s Ambroise Croizat people's house.
- Vaulx-en-Velin (Rhône)'s Ambroise Croizat primary and secondary schools.
- Tarnos (Landes)'s Ambroise Croizat vocational school.
- Nice (Alpes-Maritimes)'s previous Social security center.
- Fontenay-sous-Bois' Ambroise Croizat retired people's house.
- Gonfreville-l'Orcher's Ambroise-Croizat space, inside the Pôle Santé.
- Grigny's Ambrosie Croizat Health center, inaugurated on 13 April 2019.

=== Other ===
- In 2015, the French Post Office (la Poste française) issued a postage stamp commemorating the funding of Social security, illustrated with Ambroise Croizat's and Pierre Laroque's portraits.
- A documentary movie on the History of Social security pays tribute to Ambroise Croizat: La Sociale, produced by Gilles Perret, released on 9 November 2016.

== Sources ==
=== Bibliography ===
- Michel Étiévent, Ambroise Croizat, ou l'invention sociale : suivi de lettres de prisons, 1939–1941, Gap, La Ravoire, 1999, 184 p.
- Michel Étiévent, Marcel Paul, Ambroise Croizat : chemins croisés d'innovation sociale, Éd. Gap, Challes-les-Eaux, 2008, 181 p. ISBN 978-2-7417-0373-0.
- Pierre Gastineau, " Ambroise Croizat ", in " Double mètre " : vie et mort d'un syndicaliste : Alfred Lemaire, 1901–1945, Publibook, Paris, 2005, p. 173-174 ISBN 2-7483-1044-6.
- " Ambroise Croizat ", in le Dictionnaire des parlementaires français (1889–1940), under the direction of Jean Jolly, PUF, 1960.
- Bernard Friot and Christine Jakse, "Une autre histoire de la Sécurité sociale: Un levier de pouvoir peu à peu confisqué aux salariés", Le Monde diplomatique, vol.62, n°41, décembre 2015, p. 3.
- Lacroix-Riz, Annie (1983). "Un ministre communiste face à la question des salaires: l'action d'Ambroise Croizat de novembre 1945 à mai 1947". Le Mouvement Social (in French) (123): 3–44. doi:10.2307/3777839. JSTOR 3777839.

=== Other releases ===
- Sécurité sociale en France
- Assurance maladie en France
- Fédération des travailleurs de la métallurgie CGT
