= Renato Bitossi =

Italian politician

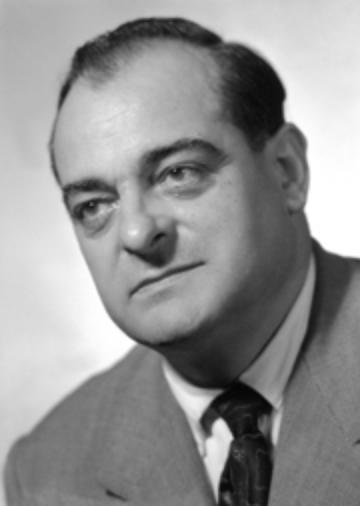
Renato Bitossi

Renato Bitossi (31 March 1899 – 5 October 1969) was an Italian trade unionist and communist activist.

Born in Florence, Bitossi became an engineering worker and joined the Italian Federation of Metallurgical Workers (FIOM). He was conscripted into the army in 1917, but was demobilised in 1919 and returned to the factory. He was elected to the local executive of the union, and was a leading figure in the factory occupations of 1920.

Bitossi was a founding member of the Communist Party of Italy (PCd'I), and was elected to the executive of its Florence branch, but in 1924 repeated attacks by Fascists led him to move to Lyon. There, he organised politically among other Italian immigrants, and was co-organiser of the PCd'I conference in the city in 1926. In 1927, he secretly moved to Milan to work for the party's executive, but he was arrested and imprisoned until 1932.

On release, Bitossi returned to communist activism, this time in Tuscany and Emilia, but he was again arrested in 1934 and confined to Ponza. He organised lectures there, and was not released until 1943. He then returned to Florence and organised armed resistance to the Fascists, and spent a brief period as deputy mayor of the city. He was also elected as chair of the city's Chamber of Labour, and to the executive of the new Italian General Confederation of Labour (CGIL).

In 1946, Bitossi was appointed as deputy secretary of CGIL, and moved to Rome; he was also elected to the central committee of the PCd'I. In 1947, he was elected as joint general secretary of CGIL, in which role he argued for centralised wage bargaining. He served as a senator from 1948 until 1968, and from 1961 was the president of the World Federation of Trade Unions.

Trade union offices
Preceded by Agostino Novella	President of the World Federation of Trade Unions; 1961–1969	Succeeded by Enrique Pastorino
