= Sándor Gáspár (politician) =

Hungarian politician (1917–2002)

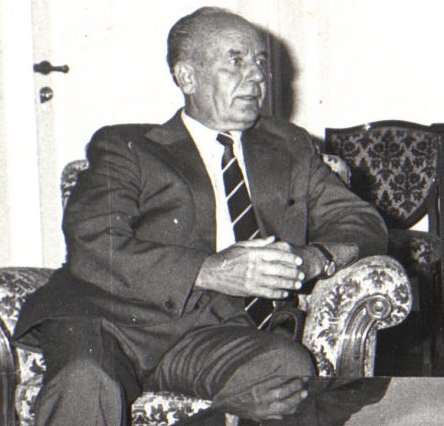
Gáspár in 1979

Sándor Gáspár (15 April 1917 – 16 April 2002) was a Hungarian communist politician and trade unionist.

Born in Pánd, Gáspár worked as a mechanic, and in 1935 joined the Metalworkers' Trade Union. The following year, he joined the Hungarian Social Democratic Party, then in 1940, the Hungarian Communist Party (MKP). In 1945, he was elected to the trade union's leadership, and as an organiser for the HCP in the sixth district of Budapest. He rapidly rose to prominence, winning election to the HCP's Central Committee in 1946, and then in 1947 winning election to Parliament. That year, he was also appointed as deputy general secretary of the metalworkers' union.

In 1948, the MKP was merged with the Social Democratic Party, to form the Hungarian Working People's Party (MDP), and he continued on the Central Committee. In 1950, he became general secretary of the metalworkers, and he spent some time studying at the Higher Party School in Moscow, in 1951/52. On his return, he was appointed as deputy general secretary of the National Council of Trade Unions (NCTU), and in 1954 he was promoted to become its president.

Gáspár was elected to the Politburo of the MDP in 1956. During the Soviet invasion of Hungary, he was loyal to János Kádár, arguing in favour of multi-party democracy, but against the workers' councils. He was one of the leading founders of the Hungarian Socialist Workers' Party (MSzMP), and remained on its central committee, and was its secretary until 1962. He was general secretary of the NCTU until 1959, and again from 1965 to 1983, then its president.

In the early 1970s, Gáspár opposed Kádár's economic reforms, becoming part of an attempt in 1972 to remove Kádár from power, although he then switched sides to support Kádár. In 1978, he was elected as president of the World Federation of Trade Unions (WFTU).

Gáspár opposed the reforms of the late 1980s, and stood down from the NCTU and the central committee of the MSzMP in 1988. The following year, he also left the WFTU, and entered retirement.

Trade union offices
Preceded by Enrique Pastorino	President of the World Federation of Trade Unions; 1978–1989	Succeeded by Indrajit Gupta
