= Trade Union International of Chemical, Energy, Metal, Oil and Allied Industries =

TUI of Chemical, Energy, Metal, Oil and Allied Industries
- Founded: 1998
- Headquarters: Montreuil, France
- Location: International
- Affiliations: WFTU

The Trade Union International of Chemical, Energy, Metal, Oil and Allied Workers (CHEMISTRY-ENERGY) is a sectoral body affiliated to the World Federation of Trade Unions (WFTU). The international federations of national trade unions are organized in specific industry sectors or occupational groups.

== History ==
The federation was founded as the Trade Union International of Energy, Metal, Chemical, Oil and Allied Industries in 1998, at a conference in Havana, by the merger of the Trade Unions International of Chemical, Oil and Allied Workers, the Trade Union International of Energy Workers and Trade Union International of Workers in the Metal Industry. It was reorganized as the new Trade Union International of Energy Workers at a conference in Mexico City in 2007. It shortened its name to the Trade Union International of Energy Workers in 2007, but has since lengthened it again.

In 2018, the international held its third congress, in Thiruvananthapuram in India. Prasanta Nandi Chowdhury of India was elected as its president, and Eric Sellini of France as its general secretary.
