= Jean Desmaison =

French trade unionist (1931–1991)

Jean Desmaison (12 October 1931 – 17 September 1991) was a French trade union leader.

Born in Limoges, Desmaison's mother died when he was three, and he was largely raised by his grandmother. He became a miller in 1951, and joined the French Confederation of Christian Workers (CFTC), in order to take part in a strike at his workplace, despite being an atheist. He then spent a year doing military service, and when he returned to work in 1954, he decided to instead join the General Confederation of Labour's affiliate, the Metalworkers' Federation.

He soon became branch secretary of the union, then in 1956 became deputy general secretary of its local section. In 1960, he joined the French Communist Party (PCF), and in 1962, he began working full-time for the union's secretariat, focusing initially on electronics workers, and then on the aviation sector.

In 1966, Desmaison was elected as general secretary of the Trade Union International of Workers in the Metal Industry, and spent three years working in Prague. He was there during the Prague Spring, and this influenced him to leave the post. He returned to work for the Metalworkers' Federation, becoming federal secretary in 1979, and winning election as general secretary in 1988. From 1989, he served on the executive of the CGT, but he retired from all his posts in 1991, after being diagnosed with cancer, and died a few days later.

Trade union offices
Preceded by Pierre Gensous	General Secretary of the Trade Union International of Workers in the Metal Industry; 1966–1969	Succeeded by Mauro Pacci
Preceded by André Sainjon	General Secretary of the Metalworkers' Federation; 1988–1991	Succeeded by Jean-Louis Fournier
