= Trade Union International of Transport Workers =

Transport workers union

The Trade Union International of Transport Workers (TUI-TRANSPORT) is a sectoral federation of workers in the transport industry, affiliated with the World Federation of Trade Unions. It was formerly known as the Trade Unions International of Transport, Port and Fishery Workers.

== History ==
The organization's roots go back to 1949 when two TUI affiliates of the WFTU were created: the Trade Unions International of Seamen and Dockers which represented seamen, inland waterways workers, fishermen and port workers, and the Trade Unions International of Land and Air Transport Workers. In March 1953, these two merged into Trade Union International of Transport, Port and Fishery Workers. It kept the latter name until at least 1978, but adopted the current name by 1985. The federation held its 14th congress in Istanbul in March 2019.

== Organization ==
TUI has a controlling congress, later called a conference, an administrative committee, a bureau and a secretariat. The union also had five branch commissions dealing with different sectors of the transportation industry: ports, civil aviation, railroads, maritime and motor transport.

The Headquarters moved many times. In 1955 its address was reported as Seilerstaette 3, Vienna 1, Austria. It shared the address with the Trade Unions International of Miners Unions. By 1957 its headquarters were in Janska 100, Prague 1, Czechoslovakia. In 1978 it was still in the same district of Prague but at Opletalova 57. By 1985 it had moved to Váci út 73,1138 Budapest, Hungary, an address it would keep until at least 1991. Its current address is at Rua Serra do Japi 31, São Paulo, Brazil.

== Membership ==
In 1978 the TUI claimed 17.5 million members in 115 unions. In 1985 it claimed 18 million members in 145 unions in 72 countries In 2004 it had 95 unions from 37 countries.

== Publications ==
The union issued a quarterly, Transport Workers of the World in English, French, Spanish and German, as well as a monthly Information Bulletin in English, French, Spanish and Russian.

== Leadership ==
=== General Secretaries ===
1953: André Fressinet
1958: Rafael Avila Gonzalez
1961: Augustin Gruenais
1970s: Debkumar Ganguli
1980s: Kulangara Chacko Mathew
1990s: Jozsef Toth
Wagner Fajardo Pereira
Ali Riza Kucukosmanoglu

=== Presidents ===
1953: Cesare Massini
1957: Alphonse Drouard
Jean Brun
Georges Lanoue
1993:
Ricardo Maldonado Olivares
