= Trade Unions International of Miners =

The Trade Unions International of Miners was a trade union international affiliated with the World Federation of Trade Unions.

== History ==
The union was founded at a Constituent Conference in Florence, Italy held July 16–19, 1949. In 1983 it expanded its scope, with unions including the British National Union of Mineworkers joining, and became the Trade Unions International of Miners and Energy Workers. In 1986 it became the Trade Unions International of Energy Workers before ceasing activities. The TUI temporarily suspended activities after the collapse of communism in Europe, but re-emerged at a conference in Havana in 1998. It joined with the Trade Union International of Metal and Engineering Workers and the Trade Unions International of Chemical, Oil and Allied Workers to form the new Trade Unions International of Energy, Mining, Chemical, Oil and Allied Industries. This organization was reformed again in 2007 adopting the name Trade Union International of Energy Workers. The metal workers then formed a new Trade Union International of Workers in the Mining, the Metallurgy and the Metal Industries

== Organization ==
The union had a controlling congress, a directing committee, a bureau and permanent secretariat. Special Commissions were also set up to deal with specific issues. In 1978 there commissions on the coal mining, other mining industries and health and safety. In 1985 there were commissions on energy, transnational corporations, peace and disarmament, as well as health and safety. In 1955 its headquarters were reported to be at Seilerstaette 3, Vienna 1, Austria. It shared the address with the Trade Unions International of Transport Workers, the World Federation of Teachers Unions and the Trade Unions International of Workers of the Metal and Mechanical Industries. By 1957 it had relocated to 100 Janská Prague 1. It again shared its address with the Transport and Metal Workers TUI. In 1978 its headquarters was reported at Kopernika 36/40 Warsaw, an address it kept to at least 1991.

== Publications ==
The Union published Miners International News in English, French and Spanish from 1956 until at least the late 1970s. In 1972 it began a quarterly, The Messenger, directed only to members of the administrative committee. The Union published a fortnightly called Miners of the World in French, Russian and Spanish. This became Bulletin (Trade Unions International of Miners and Workers in Energy) in 1984.

== Leadership ==
=== General Secretaries ===
1950: Henri Turrel
1955: Victorin Duguet
1965: Lucien Labrune
1970: Attilio Francini
1980: Alain Simon
1985: Eugeniusz Mielnicki
1980s: Mieczyslaw Jurek

=== Presidents ===
1950: Stefan Ciołkowski
1959: Michal Specjal
1972: Jan Les
1981: Jan Konieczny
1985: François Duteil
1994: François Duteil and Arthur Scargill

== See also ==
- International Federation of Chemical, Energy, Mine and General Workers' Unions
