= Louis Saillant =

French trade unionist (1910–1974)

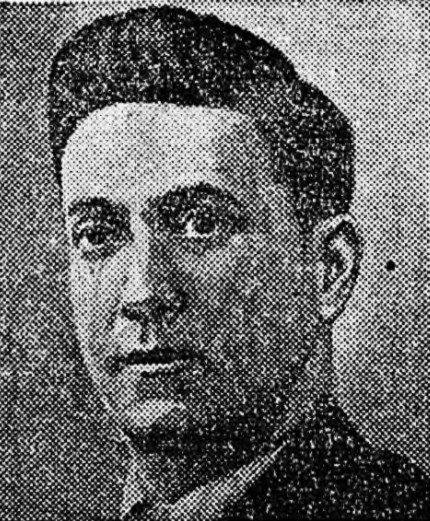
Saillant in 1944

Louis André Saillant (French pronunciation: [lwi ɑ̃dʁe sajɑ̃]; 27 November 1910 – 28 October 1974) was a French trade unionist and resistance fighter.

== Biography ==
Born in Valence, Drôme, Saillant worked as a cabinet maker. He became active in the General Confederation of Labour (CGT), becoming secretary of its Building and Woodworkers' Federation. In 1940, the Vichy government outlawed trade unions, but the CGT continued, illegally, in support of the French Resistance. Saillant was a signatory to the Manifesto of the Twelve, in which twelve leading trade unionists publicly opposed Vichy policy, and was also active in Libération-Nord.

In 1943, the CGT was a founding element of the National Council of the Resistance (CNR), and Saillant became its delegate to the CNR, taking over as chair of the resistance in 1944.

In 1945, he attended the World Trade Union Conference in London alongside many renowned trade unionists and he was elected as the general secretary of the World Federation of Trade Unions (WFTU). When the anti-communist wing split away from the CGT and formed Workers' Force (FO), he supported the generally communist majority, but thereafter devoted his time to the WFTU. In 1948, he was excluded from the French Section of the Workers' International (SFIO) for having sided with the CGT in the split.

Saillant denounced the 1968 invasion of Czechoslovakia. He resigned as leader of the WFTU shortly afterwards, blaming health problems, and was instead made honorary president of the federation. He was also president of the World Peace Movement, and won the Lenin Prize.

Military offices
Preceded by Georges Bidault	Chair of the National Council of the Resistance; 1944	Succeeded by Victory in France
Trade union offices
Preceded by New position	General Secretary of the World Federation of Trade Unions; 1945–1968	Succeeded by Pierre Gensous
