= Trade Union International of Workers in the Mining, the Metallurgy and the Metal Industries =

The Trade Union International of Workers in the Mining, the Metallurgy and the Metal Industries (TUI MMM) is a trade union international affiliated with the World Federation of Trade Unions.

== History ==
The federation was established at a conference in San Sebastian, in Basque Country, held from 19-20, May 2008. The federation claims the historical legacy of two earlier TUIs: the Trade Unions International of Workers of the Metal and Mechanical Industries which dissolved during the fall of communism in Europe, and the Trade Unions International of Energy Workers. The latter organisation was founded in 1949 as the Trade Unions International of Miners and later expanded its sectoral jurisdiction to energy. Like the Metal Workers TUI, it went dormant in the early 1990s but was revived a conference in Havana in 1998. It was reorganized again in 2007 at a conference in Mexico City adopting the TUI of Energy moniker. This left the mining and metallurgy field open and the next year the new union was founded in Spain.

As of 2020, the federation was led by president P. K. Das of India, and general secretary Francisco José Sousa e Silva.
