= National Federation of Chemical Industries =

Trade union of France

The National Federation of Chemical Industries (French: Fédération nationale des industries chimiques, FNIC) is a trade union representing workers in the chemical industry in France.

The union was founded in 1907 as the Oil and Gas Workers' Federation, as an affiliate of the General Confederation of Labour (CGT). In 1909, it was renamed as the Federation of Chemical Products. In 1921, it suffered a major split, with left-wingers forming the United Federation of Chemical Industries, but they rejoined in 1935, with their general secretary, Eduoard Finck, becoming secretary of the merged union. This took membership from 4,000 to a claimed 190,000, and although the union was banned during World War II, it reformed after the war and had 160,000 members in 1946.

By 1994, the union's membership had fallen 22,156. It has since stabilised, and was 24,814 in 2019.

== General Secretaries ==
1900s: E. Bernaud
1910s: Decouzon
1922: Loze
1928: Van den Bossche
1935: Édouard Finck
1958: Roger Pascré
1978: Jean Vincent
1991: Georges Hervo
2001: Jean Michel Petit
2015: Carlos Moreira
