= Vietnam General Confederation of Labour =

Vietnamese national trade union center

- Tổng Liên đoàn Lao động Việt Nam
- Abbreviation: VGCL
- Nickname: Công đoàn
- Founded: 28 July 1929
- Headquarters: Hanoi, Vietnam
- Location: Vietnam
- Members: ▲8.600.000+ (2025)
- Key people: Bui Van Cuong, President
- Parent organization: Vietnam Fatherland Front
- Affiliations: WFTU
- Website: www.congdoan.vn

The Vietnam General Confederation of Labour (VGCL) is the sole national trade union federation in Vietnam. It was founded 28 July 1929 as the Red Workers' General Union in North Vietnam, and extended into the entire country after the collapse of South Vietnam in 1975. It has passed through a number of different names to its present title: The Red Trade Union/Red Workers' General Union (to 1935), The Friendship Union (to 1939), The Anti-Imperial Workers' Association (to 1941), The National Salvation Workers' Association (to 1946), and two different Vietnamese versions of The Vietnam General Confederation of Labour.

The VGCL's role, as shown on the Vietnamese side of its website, includes a "responsibility to implement the party's directions and policies and to contribute to the party's development". It is under the oversight of the Communist Party: "The party oversees the way the VGCL implements the party's directions and policies."

All trade unions in Vietnam are required by law to affiliate to the VGCL, and the VGCL is one of the mass movements of the Vietnamese Fatherland Front and is practically aligned to the Communist Party of Vietnam. Bui Van Cuong, the VGCL president, is a member of the Communist Party of Vietnam Central Committee.

The VGCL is affiliated to the World Federation of Trade Unions. In 2011 VGCL President Bui Van Cuong was elected a WFTU Vice-president.

== Organization ==
The VGCL is composed of 63 local federations of labor, representing cities and provinces.

=== Affiliated unions ===
There are 20 affiliated National Industrial Unions:

- Vietnam National Union of Post and Telecom Workers
- Vietnam National Union of Petroleum and Gas Workers
- Vietnam National Education Union
- Vietnam National Union of Industrial and Commercial Workers
- Vietnam National Union of Electricity Workers
- Vietnam National Union of Railway Workers
- Vietnam National Union of Transport Workers
- Vietnam National Union of Aviation Workers
- Vietnam National Union of Maritime Workers
- Vietnam National Union of Banking Workers
- Vietnam National Union of Building Workers
- Vietnam National Union of Health Workers
- Vietnam National Union of Agricultural & Rural Development Workers
- Vietnam Public Sector Union
- Vietnam National Union of Rubber Workers
- Vietnam National Union of Coal and Mineral Workers
- Trade Union Committee of People's Police
- Trade Union Committee of National Defense

== See also ==
- History of formation and development of the Vietnam Trade Union organization Archived 29-07-2026 from the Official Website.
- Summary of the formation and development of the working class and the Vietnam Trade Union organization, a more in depth history of the formation of the Vietnamese Trade Union Organization in 6 parts available from the Official website:

Part 1 (Earliest History-1929)
Part 2 (1930-1945)
Part 3 (1946-1954)
Part 4 (1954-1975)
Part 5 (1975-1986)
Part 6 (1986-2005)
Archived on 29-07-2026: 1, 2, 3, 4, 5, 6
