= World Federation of Trade Unions =

International trade union federation

- Predecessor: IFTU
- Founded: October 3, 1945; 81 years ago
- Headquarters: Athens
- Location: Greece
- Members: 105 million (2022)
- President: Mzwandile Makwayiba
- Key people: Pambis Kyritsis (General Secretary)
- Website: wftucentral.org

The World Federation of Trade Unions (WFTU) is an international federation of trade unions established on October 3, 1945. Founded in the immediate aftermath of World War II, the organization built on the pre-war legacy of the International Federation of Trade Unions as a single structure for trade unions world-wide, following the World Trade Union Conference in London, United Kingdom.

With the emergence of the Cold War in the late 1940s, the WFTU splintered, with most trade unions from the Western-aligned countries leaving and creating the International Confederation of Free Trade Unions (ICFTU) in 1949. Throughout the Cold War, membership of the WFTU was made up predominantly of trade unions from the Soviet-aligned and non-aligned countries. However, there were notable exceptions to this, such as the Yugoslav and Chinese unions, which departed following the Tito-Stalin and Sino-Soviet splits, respectively, or the French CGT and Italian CGIL unions, who were members. With the end of the Cold War and the dissolution of the Soviet Union, the WFTU lost the largest portion of its membership and financial support. Since the start of the 2000s, the organization shifted headquarters to Athens and recruited new members, claiming to have grown from representing 48 million workers in 2005 to 105 million in 2022.

== History ==
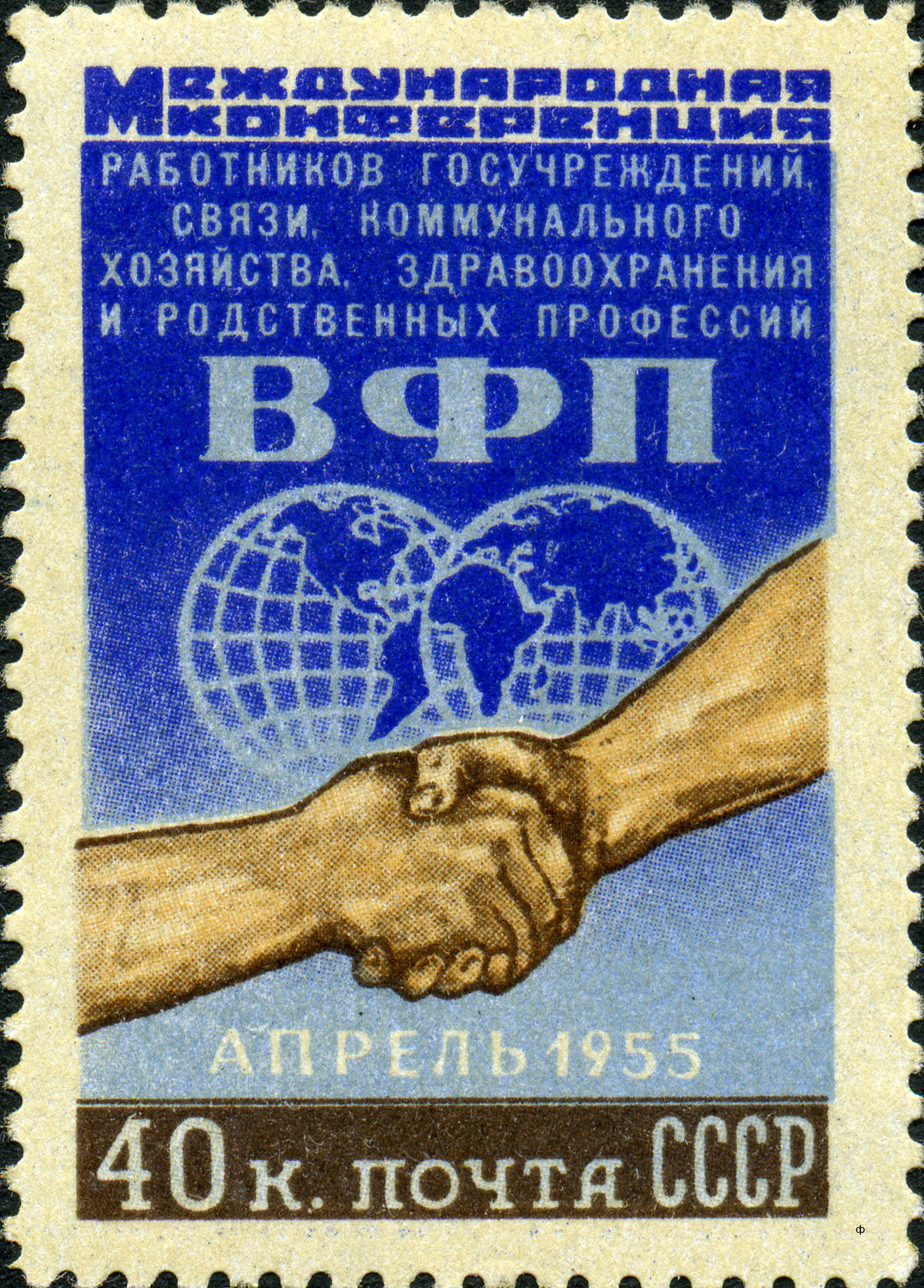
1955 USSR stamp with WFTU logo

=== Rise ===
The British Trades Union Congress (TUC) organized a World Trade Union Conference at County Hall, London from February 6–17, 1945. It was attended by 204 delegates from 53 national and international worker organizations, the majority of which with were trade union centers in the countries of the anti-Hitler coalition. Discussions in the conference, which was chaired jointly by the TUC, American Congress of Industrial Organizations (CIO) and Soviet All-Union Central Council of Trade Unions (AUCCTU), revolved around the future of the international labor movement, especially regarding what to do with the International Federation of Trade Unions (IFTU) after World War II. A resolution was adopted to convene another global conference in Paris to create an international labor federation to be called the World Federation of Trade Unions (WFTU).

Notably, the American Federation of Labor (AFL) boycotted both conferences. The AFL, led by vehemently anticommunist individuals, did not want to associate with Soviet trade unions. It was also not willing to join forces with the CIO, which broke away from the AFL in 1935 and was accused of weakening the labor movement in the US.

The WFTU's mission was to bring together trade unions across the world in a single international organization. When created, the WFTU represented the first time since 1919 that the division at international level between communist and non-communist labor movements had formally been bridged. After a number of Western trade unions left it in 1949, as a result of disputes over support for the Marshall Plan, to form the International Confederation of Free Trade Unions (ICFTU), the WFTU was made up primarily of unions affiliated with or allegedly sympathetic to communist parties. In the context of the Cold War, the WFTU was often portrayed in the West as a Soviet front organization. A number of those unions, including those from Yugoslavia and China, left later when their governments had ideological differences with the Soviet Union.

In 1952, the WFTU organised a speaking tour of the Caribbean for communist activists Billy Strachan and Ferdinand Smith.

=== Decline ===
The WFTU declined as a result of the collapse of the Soviet Union and socialist governments in Eastern Europe, in particular in Europe, with many of its former constituent unions joining the ICFTU. That fall seems to have come to an end since the congress in Havana in 2005 where a new leadership was elected with Georges Mavrikos, a Greek union activist from PAME, leading member of the Communist Party of Greece (KKE), at its head.

In January 2006 it moved headquarters from Prague, Czech Republic to Athens, Greece and reinvigorated its activity by putting focus on organizing regional federations of unions in the Third World, by organizing campaigns against imperialism, racism, poverty, environmental degradation and exploitation of workers under capitalism and in defense of full employment, social security, health protection, and trade union rights. The WFTU devotes much of its energy to organizing conferences, issuing statements and producing educational materials and courses for trade union leaders.

In recent years, the WFTU has successfully managed to recruit several trade unions of importance in Europe, amongst them the Rail Maritime Trade Union in Great Britain and the Unione Sindacale di Base in Italy. In France, the CGT National Federation of Agri-Food and Forestry has maintained its affiliation with the WFTU. The CGT National Federation of Chemical Industries sent delegates to the last congress in Athens in 2011. In 2013, two local CGT railway workers branches have taken steps to become affiliates with the WFTU.

The different offices of the WFTU across the different continents organize regular exchanges and militant visits of trade union activists from an affiliate to another in order to further discussions, foster internationalist ties, establish an international activity of its affiliates around shared objectives and campaigns, against common adversaries.

In Africa, unions of major importance such as COSATU in South Africa have affiliated with the WFTU.

As part of its efforts to advance its international agenda, the WFTU develops working partnerships with national and industrial trade unions worldwide as well as with a number of international and regional trade union organizations including the Organization of African Trade Union Unity (OATUU), the International Confederation of Arab Trade Unions (ICATU), the Permanent Congress of Trade Union Unity of Latin America (CPUSTAL), and the General Confederation of Trade Unions of Commonwealth of Independent States.

The WFTU holds consultative status with the Economic and Social Council of the United Nations, the ILO, UNESCO, FAO, and other UN agencies. It maintains permanent missions in New York, Geneva, and Rome.

WFTU poster urging solidarity with the Bolivian Workers' Center

== Affiliates ==
=== National Affiliates ===
Example of National affiliates of the WFTU include:

- General Federation of Trade Unions of Korea (North Korea)
- All-Workers Militant Front (Greece)
- "Amanat" Commonwealth of Trade Unions (Kazakhstan)
- Unione Sindacale di Base (Italy)
- Bangladesh Trade Union Centre (Bangladesh)
- Jatio Sramik Federation (Bangladesh)
- Samajtantrik Sramik Front (Bangladesh)
- Vietnam General Confederation of Labour (Vietnam)
- Confederation of Revolutionary Trade Unions of Turkey (Turkey)
- National Union of Rail, Maritime and Transport Workers (United Kingdom)
- Congress of South African Trade Unions (South Africa)
- Bolivian Workers' Center (Bolivia)
- Workers' Central Union of Cuba (Cuba)
- General Union of Palestinian Workers (GUPW) (Palestine)
- Confederación General de Trabajadores del Perú (Peru)
- General Federation of Trade Unions (Syria)
- All India Trade Union Congress (India)
- Centre of Indian Trade Unions (India)
- All India Central Council of Trade Unions (India)
- Intersindical-CSC (Spain)
- Coordinadora Obrera Sindical (Spain)
- Coordinadora Sindical de Clase (Spain)
- Frente Sindical Obrero de Canarias (Spain)
- Confederation Intersindical Galega (Spain)
- Langile Abertzaleen Batzordeak (Spain)
- Workers' House (Iran)
- Unidade Classista (Brazil)
- Central dos Trabalhadores e Trabalhadoras do Brasil (Brazil)
- United Trade Unions of Serbia "Sloga" (Serbia)
- Labor Today International (LTI) (USA)
- Union of Trade Unions of Monaco (Monaco)
- National Federation of Agri-Food and Forestry (France)
- National Federation of Chemical Industries (France)
- Union of Trade Unions of Russia (Russia)
- Congress of Indonesia Unions Alliance (Konfederasi KASBI) (Indonesia)
- Pancyprian Federation of Labour (Cyprus)
- General Confederation of the Portuguese Workers (Portugal)
- Kilusang Mayo Uno (Philippines)
- Lao Federation of Trade Unions (Laos)
- Confederación de Trabajadores del Ecuador (Ecuador)

=== Trade Union Internationals ===
During the late 1940s, the WFTU unsuccessfully tried to reach an agreement with already existing international trade secretariats. When the Union split in 1949 they were left without an organization at the level of specific industries, leading to the creation of the Trade Union International (TUI) system.

The TUI system has gone through a number of transformations in its over 60 years of existence. The following Trade Unions Internationals are constituted within the WFTU:

- World Federation of Teachers Unions – known by its French acronym FISE, this is the earliest affiliated union, founded in 1946. It maintained a degree of independence from the WFTU not exercised by the other TUIs.
- In 1949, the 2nd World Congress decided to create a series of sectoral unions, after their negotiations with already existing international trade secretariats failed. At first these were known as Trade Departments or International Federations, but they adopted the appellation "Trade Union Internationals" by the mid-1950s. The original TUIs formed in 1949 and 1950 were:
- The WFTU functioned during the Cold War largely as a unitary organization, bringing together unions from the Communist bloc and Western unions.
  - Trade Union International of Agricultural and Forestry Workers (also known as the TUI of Agricultural, Forestry and Plantation Workers)
  - Trade Unions International of Building, Wood, Building Materials and Industries
  - International Union of Trade Unions of Postal, Telephone and Telegraph Workers (also known as the TUI of Postal, Telegraph, Telephone and Radio Workers)
  - Trade Union International of Chemical and Allied Workers
  - Trade Unions International of Miners
  - Trade Union International of Food, Tobacco, Hotel and Allied Industries Workers (also known as the TUI of Food, Tobacco and Catering Workers or the TUI of Food, Tobacco and Beverage Industries, and Hotel, Cafe and Restaurant Workers)
  - Trade Union International of Metal and Engineering Workers (also known as the TUI of Workers in the Metal Industry)
  - Trade Union International of Textile and Clothing Workers
  - Trade Union International of Leather, Shoe, Fur and Leather Products
  - Trade Unions International of Seamen and Dockers
  - Trade Unions International of Land and Air Transport Workers

Over time, some of these original eleven would expand their bases, change their names or merge:

- In 1953, the TUIs of Seamen and Dockers and Land and Air Transport Workers merged to form the Trade Unions International of Transport, Port and Fishery Workers. By 1985, this union had adopted its present name, Trade Unions International of Transport Workers.
- In 1954 the TUI of Chemical and Allied Workers expanded its sectoral base and became the Trade Unions International of Chemical, Oil and Allied Workers.
- In 1955 the International Union of Trade Unions of Postal, Telephone and Telegraph Workers expanded its scope to all public employees and became the Trade Unions International of Public and Allied Employees.
- In 1958 the TUIs of Leather, Shoe, Fur and Leather Products and of Textile and Clothing Workers merged to form the Trade Union International of Textile, Leather and Fur Workers Unions.
- In 1983 the TUI of Miners expanded its scope and became the Trade Unions International of Miners and Energy Workers. In 1986 it became the Trade Unions International of Energy Workers before ceasing activities.

Other than the initial eleven, two new TUIs were formed during the course of the Cold War:

- Trade Union International of Workers in Commerce formed in 1959
- Standing Committee of Trade Unions in the Graphic Industry formed in 1961, allied with, but not formally affiliated to the WFTU.

==== Post-Cold War developments ====
After the dissolution of the Eastern bloc, the Trade Unions International of Energy Workers and the Trade Union International of Metal and Engineering Workers temporarily suspended operations. In 1998 a conference was held in Havana which merged these two organizations and the Trade Union International of Chemical, Oil and Allied Workers in a new group, Trade Union International of Energy, Metal, Chemical, Oil and Allied Industries. This organization was reorganized again as the Trade Unions International of Energy Workers in 2007. This left the metal workers an opportunity create a new TUI the next year, Trade Union International of Workers in the Mining, the Metallurgy and the Metal Industries.

In 1997 the Trade Union International of Agroalimentary, Food, Commerce, Textile & Allied Industries was formed by the merger of the Trade Union International of Agricultural, Forestry and Plantation Workers, Trade Union International of Food, Tobacco, Hotel and Allied Industries Workers, Trade Union International of Workers in Commerce, Trade Union International of Textile, Leather and Fur Workers Unions.

The Trade Union International of Workers in Tourism and Hotels was founded in 2009, the Trade Union International of Banks, Insurance and Financial Unions Employees in 2011 and the Trade Union International of Pensioners and Retired Persons in 2014. In 2020, a new Trade Union International of Textile-Garment-Leather was founded.

== Leadership ==
=== General Secretaries ===
1945: Louis Saillant (France)
1969: Pierre Gensous (France)
1978: Enrique Pastorino (Uruguay)
1982: Ibrahim Zakaria (Sudan)
1990: Alexander Zharikov (Russia)
2005: George Mavrikos (Greece)
2022: Pambis Kyritsis (Cyprus)

=== Presidents ===
1945: Walter Citrine (United Kingdom)
1946: Arthur Deakin (United Kingdom)
1949: Giuseppe Di Vittorio (Italy)
1959: Agostino Novella (Italy)
1961: Renato Bitossi (Italy)
1969: Enrique Pastorino (Uruguay)
1975: Sándor Gáspár (Hungary)
1989: Indrajit Gupta (India)
1990: Ibrahim Zakaria (Sudan)
1994: Antonio Neto (Brazil)
2000: K. L. Mahendra (India)
2005: Shaban Azouz (Ba'athist Syria)
2016: Mzwandile Makwayiba (South Africa)

List of World Trade Union Conferences
No.	Dates		Venue	
I	25 September- 9 October	1945	Paris	France
II	29 June-1 July	1949	Milan	Italy
III	10-21 October	1953	Vienna	Austria
IV	4-15 October	1957	Leipzig	German Democratic Republic
V	4-15 December	1961	Moscow	Soviet Union
VI	8-22 October	1965	Warsaw	Polish People's Republic
VII	17-26 October	1969	Budapest	Hungarian People's Republic
VIII	15-22 October	1973	Varna	People's Republic of Bulgaria
IX	16-22 April	1978	Prague	Czechoslovakia
X	10-15 February	1982	Havana	Cuba
XI	16-22 September	1986	East Berlin	German Democratic Republic
XII	13-20 November	1990	Moscow	Soviet Union
XIII	22-26 November	1994	Damascus	Ba'athist Syria
XIV	25-28 March	2000	Delhi	India
XV	1-4 December	2005	Havana	Cuba
XVI	6-10 April	2011	Athens	Greece
XVII	5-8 October	2016	Durban	South Africa
XVIII	6-8 May	2022	Rome	Italy

== See also ==
- List of federations of trade unions
- List of trade unions
- Predecessors:
  - International Federation of Trade Unions
  - Profintern
- Successor: International Confederation of Free Trade Unions
