= Metalworkers' Federation =

Trade union of France

The Metalworkers' Federation (French: Fédération des travailleurs de la métallurgie, FTM) is a trade union representing workers in the metallurgical industry in France.

The union was founded in May 1909 and brought together the Federal Union of Metallurgical Workers, the National Federation of Molders, the Federation of Mechanical Model Workers, and a small part of the Federation of Mechanical Workers. It is affiliated with the General Confederation of Labour. It was joined by the Federation of Drivers, Conductors and Mechanics in 1910, and the Federation of Tinsmiths and Boxworkers in 1912.

In 1921, about half the union's membership split away, joining the United General Confederation of Labour (CGTU). However, in 1922, it was strengthened when the Federation of Car and Aviation Workers joined. The CGTU unions rejoined in 1936, and this led to rapid growth for the union, with membership reaching 832,000 by 1937, and for the first time, the FTM became the largest trade union in France, leapfrogging the National Federation of Miners, Railway Workers' Federation, and National Federation of Textile Workers.

Much of the union was involved in the French resistance, although a minority, led by Marcel Roy, collaborated. In 1945, the union renamed itself as the Metalworkers' Federation of France and the Colonies, and by 1947, it claimed 900,000 members. However, this declined rapidly, with the Confederal Federation of Metalworkers splitting away in 1948. Membership fell to only 236,700 by 1959, and 62,504 in 1994.

== General Secretaries ==
1936: Ambroise Croizat
1945: Raymond Sémat
1947: Ambroise Croizat
1951: Jean Breteau
1976: André Sainjon
1988: Jean Desmaison
1991: Jean-Louis Fournier
1999: Daniel Sanchez
2008: Philippe Martinez
2015: Frédéric Sanchez
