= Laurent Wetzel =

French academic and politician (1950–2021)

Mayor of Sartrouville
- In office 1989–1995
- Preceded by: Auguste Chrétienne
- Succeeded by: Pierre Fond

General Councilor of the Canton of Sartrouville
- In office 1985–1998
- Preceded by: François Hilsum
- Succeeded by: Pierre Fond

Personal details
- Born: 16 January 1950 Landerneau, France
- Died: 12 October 2021 (aged 71)
- Party: CDS; DVD

Laurent Wetzel (16 January 1950 – 12 October 2021) was a French academic, politician, and essayist. A member of the Centre of Social Democrats (CDS) and the Miscellaneous right (DVD), he served as mayor of Sartrouville from 1989 to 1995 and General Councilor of the Canton of Sartrouville from 1985 to 1998.

== Biography ==
Wetzel was born to engineer Jacques Wetzel and nurse Hélène Durosoy in Landerneau on 16 January 1950. He graduated from the École normale supérieure in 1969 and earned an agrégation in history in 1973. He taught history, geography, and civics across multiple middle and secondary schools across Île-de-France from 1973 to 1986. He retired from teaching in 2011.

While a student, Wetzel joined the Progrès et Liberté party, founded by Jacques Soustelle. In 1983, he was elected to the Municipal Council of Sartrouville and joined the opposition bloc of the Union for French Democracy and the CDS, which opposed the French Communist Party in power, led by Mayor Auguszte Chrétienne. On 17 January 1985, he was acquitted of a defamation charge against the late communist politician Marcel Paul by the High Court of Versailles. In the 1985 French cantonal elections, he defeated the communist François Hilsum with 56% of the vote to become General Councilor of the Canton of Sartrouville.

Wetzel became Mayor of Sartrouville in 1989, defeating incumbent Auguste Chrétienne, who had served for 30 years. He was able to ride momentum against communist politicians in Europe after the fall of the Berlin Wall. While in office, he renamed the Nelson Mandela Municipal Hall after Félix Éboué. He condemned a ruling by a criminal court against the President of the Société coopérative d'intérêt collectif for violating an anti-racist law against housing discrimination after he refused to allocate social funds to house an Algerian immigrant. He also dealt with riots following the murder of an Algerian immigrant by a Tunisian security guard.

Wetzel was re-elected as General Councilor of the Canton of Sartrouville in 1992 with 53% of the vote. In 1993, he was defeated in the second round by Jacques Myard in the National Assembly for Yvelines's 5th constituency. In 1995, he was defeated by Rally for the Republic candidate Pierre Fond and lost his seat as mayor of Sartrouville. The First Administrative Court of Versailles cancelled the ballot at first due to an involuntary commitment against Wetzel which took place on 18 June 1995. However, the Conseil d'État later confirmed the election for Fond.

In 2013, Wetzel failed to be elected to the Board of Directors of the Association of Former Students École normale supérieure, an election which he claimed to have been fraudulent. On 1 March 2017, he co-founded the Cercle InterHallier.

Laurent Wetzel died on 12 October 2021, at the age of 71.

== Books ==
- Un internement politique sous la Ve République. Barbouzes et blouses blanches (1997)
- Ils ont tué l'histoire-géo (2012)
- Vingt intellectuels sous l'Occupation - Des résistants aux collabos (2020)

== Bibliography ==
- "Laurent Wetzel", in Hallier en roue libre, Jean-Pierre Thiollet, Neva Editions, 2022, p. 285-292. ISBN 978-2-35055-305-4
