= National Federation of Energy and Gas =

Trade union of France

The National Federation of Energy and Gas (French: Fédération Nationale de l'Energie et du Gaz) was a trade union representing workers in the gas, nuclear, and electricity industries in France.

The union was established in 1947, as the National Federation of Trade Unions of the Electric and Gas Industries, under Clément Delsol. A split from the General Confederation of Labour-aligned National Federation of Energy, it became a founding member of Workers' Force. By 1995, it claimed 17,250 members.

In 2000, the union merged with the Miners' Federation, to form the National Federation of Energy and Mines.
