= Seigle =

Seigle is a surname. Notable people with the surname include:

- Andy Seigle (born 1972), Filipino-American basketball player
- Danny Seigle (born 1976), Filipino-American basketball player and coach
- Jean-Luc Seigle (1956–2020), French novelist, playwright, and screenwriter
