= FNME =

FNME can stand for:

- Ferrovie Nord Milano Esercizio, former name of an Italian transport company
- National Federation of Mines and Energy, a French trade union
- ICAO code for Menongue Airport, in Angola
