= Bonnafé =

Bonnafé is a French surname. Notable people with the surname include:

- Claire Bonnafé (fl. 1977–1997), French writer and painter
- Jean-Laurent Bonnafé (born 1961), French businessman
