= Miners' federation =

Miners' federation may refer to several former trade unions:

- Miners' Federation (France)
- Miners' Federation of Australia
- Miners' Federation of Great Britain
  - Lancashire and Cheshire Miners' Federation
  - Midland Counties Miners' Federation
  - North Staffordshire Miners' Federation
  - Scottish Miners' Federation
  - South Wales Miners' Federation
- Miners' International Federation
- Western Federation of Miners, in the United States
