= A Secret =

- Film poster
- Directed by: Claude Miller
- Written by: Claude Miller
- Based on: Un secret by Philippe Grimbert
- Produced by: Yves Marmion
- Starring: Cécile De France; Patrick Bruel; Ludivine Sagnier; Julie Depardieu
- Cinematography: Gérard de Battista
- Edited by: Véronique Lange
- Music by: Zbigniew Preisner
- Distributed by: UGC Distribution
- Release date: 6 December 2007 (France)
- Running time: 105 minutes
- Country: France
- Language: French
- Box office: $14.4 million

A Secret (French: Un secret) is a 2007 French film directed and written by Claude Miller. The screenplay was based on the 2004 novel by Philippe Grimbert.

== Synopsis ==
The film follows Maxime Nathan and his family in France during the years before and after World War II. François Grimbert (played as a young boy by Valentin Vigourt and as an adult by Mathieu Amalric) grows up in Paris in the 1950s. He is the skinny, sickly son of two marvelously athletic parents, Tania (Cécile de France) and Maxime (Patrick Bruel). For a while, he dreams of a stronger, fitter, more charismatic older brother to compensate for his own feelings of inadequacy. Only gradually does he learn of his parents' tragic past and that he had a sibling — a half-brother named Simon, his father's first son.

Simon is the big secret, but the discovery opens the door to further revelations and deeper enigmas. François knows that his parents met sometime around the war, and he imagines their courtship and marriage in the shadow of atrocities which nobody talks about any more. Eventually he learns that his family is Jewish. His parents were each married to someone else before the Holocaust, and his father had a son, Simon. His parents' first spouses and his half-brother Simon were arrested by the Nazis and gassed at Auschwitz. His parents have never fully recovered from the trauma and eventually they both commit suicide.

== Cast ==
- Cécile De France as Tania Stirn/Grimbert
- Patrick Bruel as Maxime Nathan Grinberg/Grimbert
- Ludivine Sagnier as Hannah Grimbert
- Julie Depardieu as Louise
- Mathieu Amalric as François Grimbert (age 37)
- Eric Godon as Serge Klarsfeld
- Nathalie Boutefeu as Esther
- Yves Verhoeven as Guillaume
- Yves Jacques as Commandant Béraud
- Annie Grégorio as Léone
- Laurent Lafitte as The cop

== Awards and nominations ==
- César Awards
  - Won: Best Actress — Supporting Role (Julie Depardieu)
  - Nominated: Best Actress — Leading Role (Cécile De France)
  - Nominated: Best Actress — Supporting Role (Ludivine Sagnier)
  - Nominated: Best Cinematography (Gérard de Battista)
  - Nominated: Best Costume Design (Jacqueline Bouchard)
  - Nominated: Best Director (Claude Miller)
  - Nominated: Best Editing (Véronique Lange)
  - Nominated: Best Film
  - Nominated: Best Music Written for a Film (Zbigniew Preisner)
  - Nominated: Best Production Design (Jean-Pierre Kohut-Svelko)
  - Nominated: Best Adaptation (Nathalie Carter and Claude Miller)
- Montréal Film Festival
  - Won: Grand Prix des Amériques (tied with Ben X)

== Reception ==
On review aggregator website Rotten Tomatoes, A Secret has an approval rating of 80% based on 45 reviews, with an average rating of 7.00/10. The site's consensus reads: A "Secret is poignant, sad, and beautifully crafted, featuring fine performances that stave off a drift toward soap opera territory". On Metacritic, the film has a weighted average score of 72 out of 100 based on 15 reviews, indicating "generally favorable reviews".
