= Philippe Grimbert =

French writer and psychoanalyst

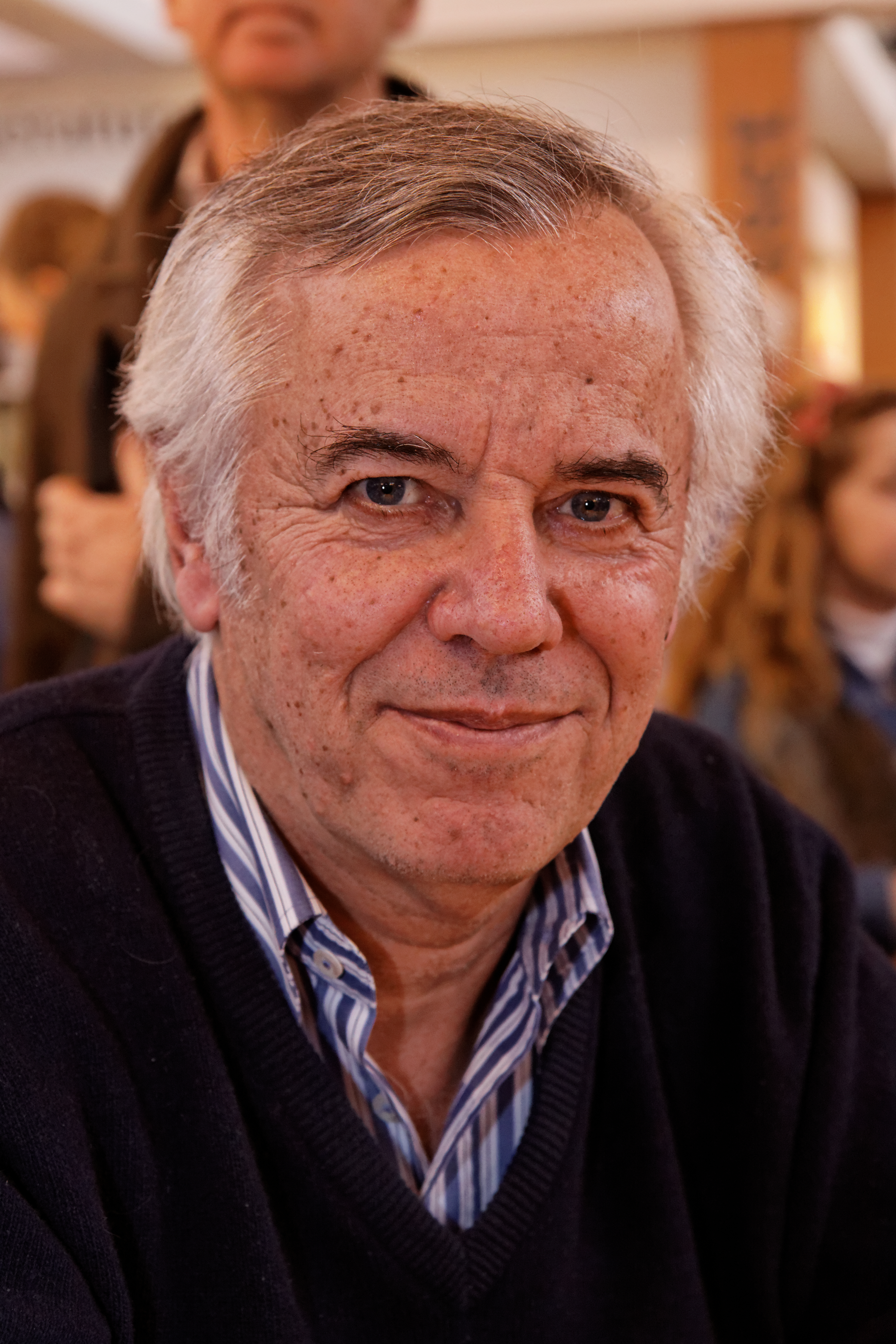
Salon Livre Paris (2012)

Philippe Grimbert (born 1948 in Paris) is a French writer and psychoanalyst.

== Biography ==
After studying psychology in 1968, Philippe Grimbert realized a Lacanian orientation analysis, before opening his own practice in Paris. He also worked in two medico-educational institutes, at Asnières and Colombes, for autistic or psychotic adolescents.

Passionate about music, dance and computer science, he published several essays, including Psychanalyse de la chanson (1996) and Pas de fumée sans Freud (1999).

La Petite Robe de Paul, published in 2001, made him known in general literature. He is the author of six novels, in particular Un secret (2004), which sold more than 1,500,000 copies and which was rewarded by the prix Goncourt des lycéens in 2004, the Grand prix des lectrices de Elle and the prix Wizo in 2005. In 2007, this novel was adapted to cinema by Claude Miller, with Patrick Bruel and Cécile de France in the lead roles.

== Works ==
=== Novels ===
- 2001: La Petite robe de Paul, Éditions Grasset, ISBN 2-246-62111-9
- 2004: Un secret, Grasset, ISBN 2-246-67011-X, Grand prix des lectrices de Elle
- 2009: La Mauvaise rencontre, Grasset, ISBN 978-2-246-75661-3
- 2011: Un garçon singulier, Grasset, ISBN 978-2-246-78496-8
- 2014: Nom de dieu !, Grasset, ISBN 978-2-246-85367-1
- 2015: Rudik, l'autre Nureyev, Paris, Plon, ISBN 9782259218498

Audio books

- 2008: A Secret, Audiolib - read by the author
- 2009: La Mauvaise rencontre, Audiolib - read by the author

=== Essays ===
- Psychanalyse de la chanson, Paris, Les Belles Lettres, Archimbaud, 1996, (L'inconscient à l'œuvre; 2). ISBN 2-251-74301-4
- Pas de fumée sans Freud : psychanalyse du fumeur, Paris, Armand Colin, 1999, (Renouveaux en psychanalyse). ISBN 2-200-25108-4
- Évitez le divan : petit manuel à l'usage de ceux qui tiennent à leurs symptômes, Paris, Hachette littératures, 2001. ISBN 2-01-235576-5
- Chantons sous la psy, Paris, Hachette Littératures, 2002. ISBN 2-01-235600-1
- Avec Freud au quotidien : essais de psychanalyse appliquée, Paris, Grasset, 2012, 316 p. OCLC 793486296

=== Others ===
- Philippe Grimbert and Claude Miller, Les Secrets d'Un secret, photos by Thierry Valletoux, preface by Amanda Sthers, Paris, Verlhac, 2007 ISBN 9782916954080 (book about the film adaptation of Claude Miller A Secret released the same year, after the eponymous novel by Philippe Grimbert.

=== Participations ===
==== Collaboration ====
- Karine Le Marchand, Devenir heureux : ces épreuves qui font notre force, with the participation of Stéphane Clerget, Philippe Grimbert and Maryse Vaillant, Paris, Calmann-Lévy, 2009

==== Prefaces ====
- 2008: Collective, Mots pour maux, collection of short stories, Éditions Gallimard
- 2009: Philippe Assoulen, Les champions juifs dans l'histoire : des sportifs face l'antisémitisme, Paris, Imago
- 2009: Helen Epstein, Écrire la vie : non-fiction, vérité et psychanalyse, translated from English (United-States) by Cécile Nelson, Paris, La Cause des livres
- 2013: Collective, Je chante avec mon bébé : 107 chansons et comptines expliquées aux parents, Au merle moqueur- 1 book and 2 CDs

== Adaptations of the work ==
=== Cinema ===
- 2007: A Secret, French film by Claude Miller, with Patrick Bruel, Cécile de France, Julie Depardieu, Ludivine Sagnier

=== Television ===
- 2011 : La Mauvaise Rencontre, French telefilm directed by Josée Dayan, with Matthieu Dessertine, Samuel Mercer, Jeanne Moreau.

=== Theatre ===
- 2009: La Petite Robe de Paul, directed by Frédéric Andrau, presented by the Théâtre de Saint-Maur, the Maison des Métallos, Théâtre de Charenton le Pont-Saint Maurice, with Fabrice Moussy, Valérie Gabriel, Andréa Brusque, Maison des Métallos, Paris

=== Bibliography and audiography ===
- Blumenfeld, Samuel (2007). "Philippe Grimbert, l'empreinte du frère". Le Monde.fr (in French). ISSN 1950-6244. LM2007.
- Laure Adler (2009). "Philippe Grimbert".
- Augustin Trapenard [in French] (2015). "Sur le divan de Philippe Grimbert".
