= Rolande Trempé =

French historian (1916–2016)

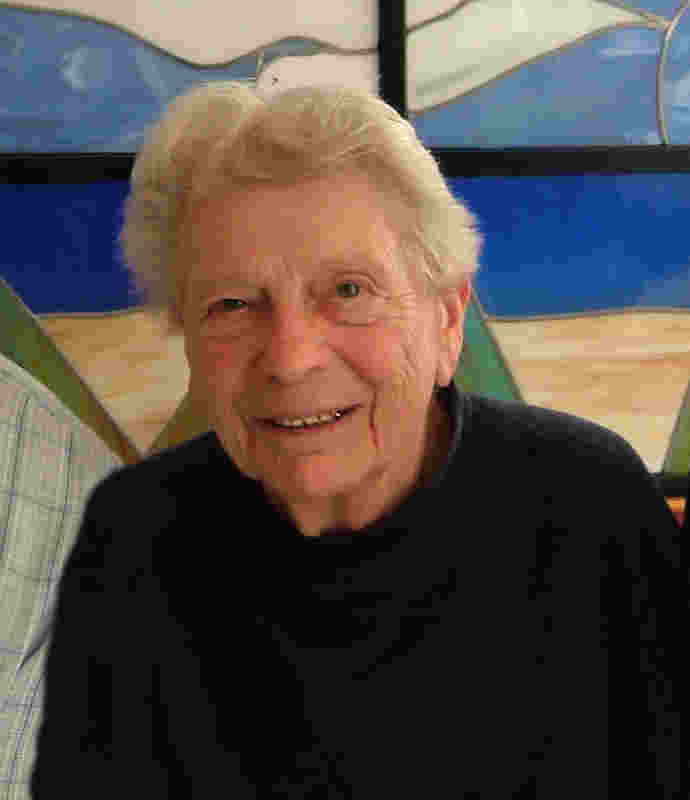
- Rolande Trempé in August 2004
- Born: 31 May 1916
- Died: 12 April 2016
- Partner: Andrée Dubos-Larouquette

Academic background
- Doctoral advisor: Jacques Godechot

Rolande Trempé (31 May 1916 – 12 April 2016) was a French Resistance fighter and historian who completed the first thesis in labour history on the miners of Carmaux. She taught throughout her life and specialised in labour history, her research interests included Jean Jaurès and the miners of Carmaux. Trempé was also a liaison officer for the French resistance and a member of the Federal Bureau of the French Communist Party.

== Early life ==
Rolande Renée Lucie Trempé was born on the 31st of May 1916 in Fontenailles. Her mother was an ironer and her father a baker and sergeant in the French army. In 1917, during the Second Battle of Verdun, her father disappeared and was never seen again.

Trempé was raised separate from her older brother by her maternal grandparents, who worked as agricultural workers, in Brie. She was recognised as a 'ward of the nation' due to the death of her father and so received a number of scholarships.

== Role in the French Communist Party ==
In 1942, in Charleville, she joined the French Communist Party and became a liaison officer and technical agent for the Francs-Tireurs et Partisans. At the time, she had little knowledge of Communism or Marxism. Her role within the French resistance consisted primarily of publishing leaflets and passing on information to various contacts, often travelling by bike. Trempé also participated in the creation of Femmes Solidaires and became the Ardennes leader of the group, hosting numerous public meetings.

She became a member of the Federal Bureau of the Communist Party, was elected to the position of municipal councillor in Ardennes and was a candidate for deputy in Ardennes in 1946. However, various members of the party disliked the fact that she overshadowed a leader and elected communist in the area. She resigned and moved to Toulouse in 1947 after various accusations and morality lawsuits for homosexuality and indiscipline amongst other things were levelled against her.

While working as an assistant at the University of Toulouse in 1968, Trempé supported the May 68 strikes and joined the student processions. The French Communist Party did not support her decision and encouraged her to surrender her card.

== Career ==
After doing well in school, she was able to continue her education and, in July 1939, obtain a certificate of aptitude for teaching in higher primary schools with a specialty in history and geography. In 1940, she became a history and geography teacher in Charleville while continuing to pursue her studies at the Sorbonne. Trempé went on to teach physical education and sports in Paris. During the summers, she took care of orphans of the Federal Union of Veterans at summer camps. Trempé had various responsibilities within this organisation and had also worked with them before the war.

In 1947, she moved to Toulouse and began to teach at a newly created school, training teachers of technical education. While living there, Trempé befriended notable labour activists such as Achille Blondeau and Marcel Pélissou. She had strong relationships with numerous other activists and went on to develop and lead training sessions on the history of the labour movement for them.

While teaching in Toulouse, she enrolled in a Diploma of Higher Studies in history under the direction of Jacques Godechot. After completing this diploma, Trempé began work on her thesis still under the supervision of Godechot. She completed this thesis, the first ever thesis in labour history on the miners of Carmaux, in 1971. She became a leading specialist on Jean Jaurès and assisted Madeleine Rebérioux, who chaired the Société d'Etudes Jaurésiennes, in creating the Jean Jaurès National Centre and Museum.

In 1961, she helped create the journal Le Mouvement social and became a member of its editorial board. During the same year, she became assistant at the Faculty of Letters in Toulouse. Trempé became an assistant at the University of Toulouse in 1964.

After retiring from university teaching in 1983, she continued her work by organising history cafes in the Hérault and the Somme and teaching educational courses at the Toulouse Labour Exchange amongst other things. In the early 2000s, she began to work with and became vice-president for the Society for Jauresian Studies.

== Death and legacy ==
Trempé died at age 99 on the 12th of April 2016 in Paris. Her funeral took place at the Père-Lachaise crematorium on 27 April. Tribute was also paid to her in July 2016 at Montpalach (Tarn-et-Garonne), the property she owned with her partner Andrée Dubos-Larouquette.

== Selected works ==
=== Books ===
- Trempé, Rolande (1971). Les Mineurs de Carmaux, 1848–1914 [The Miners of Carmaux, 1848–1914] (in French). Paris: Éditions Ouvrières.
- Trempé, Rolande (1993). Solidaires: les bourses du travail (in French). Paris. ISBN 9782209067152.

=== Articles ===
- Trempé, Rolande (2016). "Souvenirs et histoire, la traversée d'un siècle (1916–2016)" [Memories and history, crossing a century (1916–2016)]. Le Mouvement Social (in French). 255 (1): 137–159. doi:10.3917/lms.255.0137. JSTOR 26322029. S2CID 147780505.
- Trempé, Rolande (2016). "Les cigarières toulousaines en grève 1870–1875" [Women cigar makers on strike in Toulouse (1870–1875)]. Clio. Femmes, Genre, Histoire (in French). 44 (2): 281–294. JSTOR 26265053.

=== Documentaries ===
- Trempé, Rolande (1977-11-29). Un capitoul nommé Jaures : juillet 1890 – janvier 1893 [A capitoul named Jaurès: July 1890 – January 1893] (Videotape) (in French).
