= Fédération nationale des déportés et internés résistants et patriotes =

The Fédération nationale des déportés et internés résistants et patriotes (National Federation of Deported and Imprisoned Resistance Fighters and Patriots) is an organization founded by Marcel Paul and Henri Manhès in October 1945, five months after the defeat of Nazi Germany at the end of World War II. The Federation carries on the legacy of those who perished in Nazi concentration camps or were interned in prisons in occupied France and unites survivors of the camps, prisons and the French Resistance. The federation also researches and exposes the war crimes of Nazism.

Camp survivors took an oath at the scene of their suffering, vowing on behalf of the dead to ensure the future of man and his dignity. This act formed a bond between the survivors.

The Fédération nationale des déportés et internés résistants et patriotes (FNDIRP) took part in the trials against Klaus Barbie, Paul Touvier and Maurice Papon, trials for crimes against humanity.

== Federation work ==
The FNDIRP has worked in a number of areas since 1945. To ensure that the era is not forgotten, the FNDIRP produces publications, testimonials and commemorations. It supports museums and participates in the Concours national de la résistance et de la déportation, a national competition created in 1961 by the Ministry of Education to support the education of young people about war crimes and efforts of the French Resistance. The FNDIRP also supports the preservation of former concentration camps and other Nazi sites and fights Holocaust denial. It has created the Prix Marcel Paul and it publishes a newspaper called Le Patriote Résistant.

Judicial and legal activities of the FNDIRP include participation as a civil party in trials for crimes against humanity. They also take action against historical revisionists, for reparations for victims, and in support of spouses and orphans.

Internationally, the FNDIRP contributes to peace work, disarmament and economic development. They have taken part in a campaign to finance water wells, a dam and a maternity hospital in Burkina Faso. In 1996, they donated 3,500,000 French francs (about 533,572 euros) to the International Red Cross for prosthetics for Angolan land mine victims.

== Membership and leadership ==
The FNDIRP involves all the victims of Nazism and its Vichy government accomplices, members of the underground, people persecuted for race or ethnicity, exiles, patriotic resisters of the German occupation and families of the missing, murdered or massacred.

The FNDIRP was founded by Marcel Paul, a minister under Charles de Gaulle and French colonel, Henri Manhès, assistant to Jean Moulin. The honorary committee includes Juliette Gréco, Stéphane Hessel, Georges Séguy and Pierre Sudreau.
