= National Federation of Miners =

Trade union of France

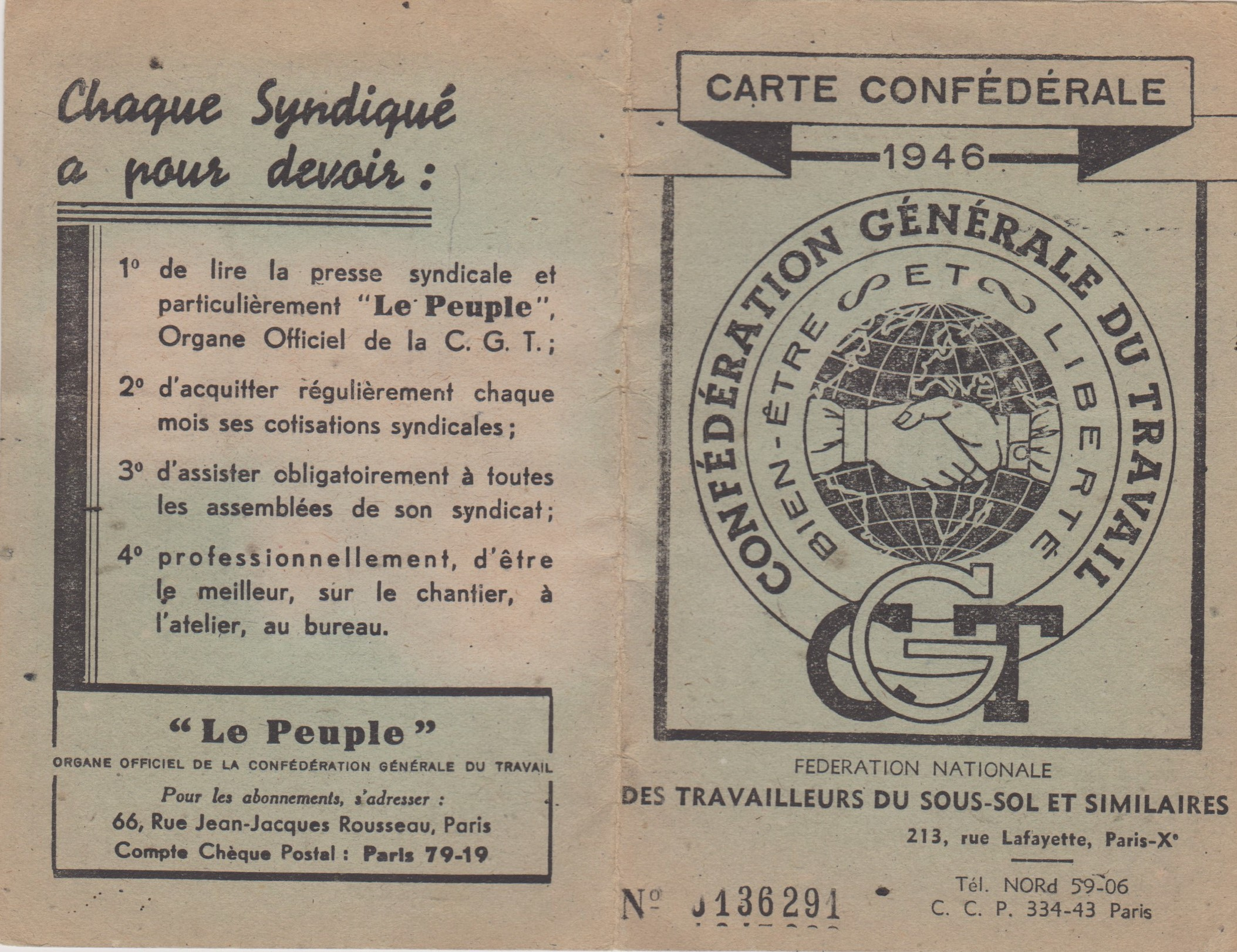
Union membership card from 1946

The National Federation of Miners (French: Fédération nationale des travailleurs du sous-sol, FNTSS-CGT) was a trade union representing miners in France.

The union traced its history to 1883, when Michel Rondet of the Union of Miners of the Loire called a conference in Saint-Étienne. This attracted eleven unions from seven regions of France, with representatives including Émile Basly from Pas-de-Calais and Jean-Baptiste Calvignac from Carmaux. The federation endured, but remained relatively small, membership peaking at 20,000 in 1891, and falling back to 12,000 in 1912. In 1906, it affiliated to the General Confederation of Labour (CGT). The National Federation of Slate Workers merged into the union in 1911, which renamed itself as the Federation of the Mining and Quarrying Industry, then in 1912 it became the National Federation of Miners and Allied Trades.

After World War I, 25,000 miners in Alsace-Lorraine transferred to the French union, and by 1920 the union membership had increased to 120,000. In 1921, part of the union joined the United General Confederation of Labor split from the CGT, reuniting in 1936. This took membership to a new high of 275,000, a membership density of more than 80%.

During World War II, many miners participated in the French resistance and there were numerous strikes, but the union's leadership, including Pierre Vigne, collaborated with the Vichy regime. After the war, all mines were nationalised, and the federation became increasingly important, with membership reaching 300,000. However, a minority, supporting the Workers' Force split from the CGT, left in 1948 to found the rival Miners' Federation.

From the 1950s, employment in the mining industry dropped rapidly, and with it, the membership of the federation. By 1963, it was down to 65,000 working members, and by 1999, only 4,000. That year, it merged with the National Federation of Energy, forming the National Federation of Mines and Energy.

== General Secretaries ==
1883: Michel Rondet
1894: Gilbert Cotte
1903: Alexandre Bexant
1910: Séraphin Cordier
1911: Casimir Bartuel
1924: Pierre Vigne
1945: Victorin Duguet
1956: Henri Martel
1959: Léon Delfosse
1968: Achille Blondeau
1980: Augustin Dufresnes
1989: Jacky Bernard
