= The Carriers Are Waiting =

- Directed by: Benoît Mariage
- Written by: Emmanuelle Bada; Benoît Mariage; Jean-Luc Seigle
- Produced by: Dominique Janne
- Starring: Benoît Poelvoorde
- Cinematography: Philippe Guilbert
- Edited by: Philippe Bourgueil
- Music by: Stéphane Huguenin; Yves Sanna
- Production company: CAB Productions
- Distributed by: Mars Distribution (France); Alternative Films (Belgium); Filmcoopi (Switzerland)
- Release dates: 14 May 1999 (Cannes Film Festival); 19 May 1999 (Belgium)
- Running time: 94 min
- Countries: France; Belgium; Switzerland
- Language: French
- Budget: $3 million
- Box office: $1.4 million

The Carriers Are Waiting (French: Les Convoyeurs Attendent) is a French-Belgian-Swiss 1999 film directed by Benoît Mariage. It was awarded the Bronze Horse prize for best film of that year by the Stockholm International Film Festival.

== Cast ==
- Benoît Poelvoorde : Roger Closset
- Morgane Simon : Louise Closset
- Bouli Lanners : Coach
- Dominique Baeyens : Madeleine Closset
- Philippe Grand'Henry : Felix
- Jean-François Devigne : Michel Closset
- Lisa Lacroix : Jocelyne
- Philippe Nahon : Overseer
- Édith Le Merdy : Edith
- Patrick Audin : Patrick
