= Achille Blondeau =

French trade unionist (1925–2019)

General Secretary of the National Federation of Miners
- In office 1968–1980
- Preceded by: Léon Delfosse
- Succeeded by: Augustin Dufresnes

Personal details
- Born: July 9, 1925 Auby, France
- Died: September 21, 2019 (aged 94) Cap-Ferret, France
- Other political affiliations: French Communist Party
- Spouse: Louisette Blondeau (1948)

Achille Blondeau (9 July 1925 – 21 September 2019) was a French Trade Unionist, miner and general secretary of the National Federation of Miners from 1968 to 1980. He took part in major strikes in 1941, 1948 and 1963. Blondeau was also a member of the French Communist Party and was arrested by the Gestapo in 1943.

== Early life ==
Blondeau was born on the 9th of July 1925 in Auby. Both his father and grandfather were both miners. His father was played numerous roles in miners unions and was elected as city councillor in 1935.

In 1937, he graduated primary school with first class honours. He received a scholarship for further study but his father refused to allow him to became an engineer when his brothers would have to be miners. Blondeau carried out seasonal agricultural work and began to play the flugelhorn in a brass band.

== Role in the French Communist Party ==
In October 1940, Blondeau joined the Communist Youth. The Gestapo arrested him and other members of the Communist Youth in January 1943 and he was incarcerated in Cuincy before being deported to Huy in Belgium. In September 1943, prisoners in Huy who had not been tried were brought back to France to face trial. Blondeau faced trial in Douai where he was acquitted. A few weeks later, he was imprisoned by German forces and did not get released until February 1944.

After his release, Blondeau resumed his work with the French Resistance and joined the Francs-Tireurs et Partisans. He helped form a three-person FTP resistance group in Raimbeaucourt which distributed leaflets and put up posters. The group also dumped gasoline that would have been used by retreating Germans, arrested a collaborator and helped arrest a group of German soldiers.

== Career ==
In 1939, at age 14, Blondeau was hired by the Aniche Mining Company. He took part in the 1941 miners strike against Nazi occupation in France. In 1948, he helped lead another major miners strike.

For a short time, Blondeau left mining to be a soldier in the French army but he returned in 1945 in order to avoid fighting in Mainland Southeast Asia. He did not support the Indochina Wars and was prosecuted for promoting disobedience amongst French soldiers. A campaign of support from the French Communist Party helped limit his punishment to a fine.

Blondeau was elected to the administrative commission of the National Federation of Miners in 1951. He was the National Federation of Miners' secretary for youth and federal treasurer from 1956 to 1958 and edited the union's newspaper Le Travailleur du sous-so. In 1968, he was elected as General Secretary, a position he held until he retired in 1980. Blondeau left the administrative commission and joined the executive commission in 1969 where he served until 1977. While in the executive commission, he exercised eleven confederate mandates.

He also took part in a major miners strikes in 1963. As General Secretary, Blondeau participated in discussions and decisions which shaped the strike and its outcome.

From 1978 to 1983, Blondeau was an administrator for Charbonnages de France. After retiring in 1980, Blondeau lead the Institute of Social History of Mines and Energy. In 1981, he was arrested in Santiago while working on behalf of the Miners' International Federation.

== Personal life ==
Blondeau met his wife, Louisette, in October 1947 through the Communist Youth. They were married in June 1948.

In 1971, Louis Viannet hosted Blondeau in Argenteuil after the tower Blondeau was in exploded. This caused the two to become close friends. Blondeau was also friends with historian Rolande Trempé.

== Death and legacy ==
Blondeau died at age 94 on the 21st of September 2019 in Cap-Ferret. In 2006, Pierre Outteryck published a biography on Blondeau titled Achille Blondeau: Mineur résistant déporté syndicaliste.

== Selected works ==
- Blondeau, Achille (2019). "Les mineurs et la grève" [Miners and the strike]. Militantisme et histoire [Activism and History] (in French). Toulouse: Presses universitaires du Midi. ISBN 978-2-85816-522-3.
- Blondeau, Achille (2005). "La CGT et la question de l'unité" [The CGT and the question of unity]. La CGT dans les années 1950 [The CGT in the 1950s] (in French). Presses universitaires de Rennes. ISBN 9782753501379.

Trade union offices
Preceded by Léon Delfosse	General Secretary of the National Federation of Miners; 1968–1980	Succeeded by Augustin Dufresnes
