= Jeanne Bourin =

French writer (1922–2003)

- Born: Jeanne Mondot; 13 January 1922; Paris
- Died: 19 March 2003 (aged 81); Le Mesnil-le-Roi
- Resting place: Le Mesnil-le-Roi
- Occupation: Writer
- Spouse: André Bourin
- Writing career
- Notable awards: – Légion d'honneur Ordre national du Mérite

Jeanne Bourin or Jeanne Mondot (13 January 1922 – 19 March 2003) was a French writer known for her historical novels.

== Life ==
Jeanne Mondot was born in Paris in 1922. She married the writer André Bourin in 1942. Catholic returned to the faith of her childhood at the age of 40, she admires medieval society which she studied extensively and depicts she in the framework of her novels.

In 1963, her book Le bonheur est une femme: roman and this was a historic fiction about the relationship between Pierre de Ronsard (Prince of Poets) and Cassandra Salviati.

Her sentimental and idealized vision of the Middle Ages, still close to the one of Régine Pernoud, earned her criticism from academics such as the medievalist Robert Fossier. She rediscovers, following Régine Pernoud, the important place given to women at that time, and especially from the eleventh to the thirteenth century. By thus going against many preconceived ideas about the Middle Ages, she honours these centuries which she qualified in her autobiographical story The Smile of the Angel (Le sourire de l'ange) as "courteous, luminous and creative".

She wrote a number of other novels and she was given several awards including the Legion of Honour.

Jeanne Bourin died in Le Mesnil-le-Roi in 2003.

== Notable works ==
- Le bonheur est une femme (1963)
- Très sage Héloïse (1966)
- Agnès Sorel, la dame de Beauté (1970)
- La Chambre des dames (1979), Grand prix des lectrices de Elle
- Le Jeu de la tentation (1981)
- Cuisine médiévale pour tables d'aujourd'hui (1983)
- Le Grand feu (1985)
- Les Amours blessées (1987)
- Les Pérégrines (1989)
- La Rose et la Mandragore (1990)
- Compagnons d’éternité (1992)
- La Garenne (1994)
- Le Sourire de l'Ange (1996)
