= Grand prix des lectrices de Elle =

- Awarded for: "the best and most imaginative prose work of the year"
- Date: May, annual
- Country: France
- Presented by: Elle
- First award: 1970
- Website: Prix Lectrices de Elle

The Grand prix des lectrices de Elle is a French literary prize awarded by readers of Elle magazine.

== History ==
Unlike other literary prizes that have professionals for their juries and selection committees, the Grand prix des lectrices de Elle is a public award, convened and selected by readers of the magazine, and aimed at giving a voice to women who love to read. At its inception in 1969 by Hélène Lazareff, it was awarded solely to novels. From 1977, two categories were recognised - literary fiction and non-fiction. From 2002, crime fiction also came to be awarded.

Until 1992, eight regional committees designated at the first instance books of the month. A national jury then took over to elect the two major prizewinners in the categories of novels and non-fiction. Currently, eight monthly juries of fifteen readers each form the grand jury of 120 readers.

The editor of the Elle magazine makes an initial selection of books, emphasising first works or young authors or new publishers, and systematically eliminating the works that have already won major literary awards such as the Prix Goncourt, Prix Femina or the Prix Médicis. After this, every month from September to April, the eight juries of fifteen readers of Elle magazine deliberate to select their finalists, which in turn will be read by all the juries to select the grand winner in May.

== Novels (from 1970) ==
- 1970: Arlette Grebel, Ce soir, Tania... - Éditions Gallimard
- 1971: Michèle Perrein, La Chineuse - Éditions Julliard
- 1972: Elvire de Brissac, Un long mois de septembre - Éditions Grasset
- 1973: Simone Schwarz-Bart, Pluie et vent sur Télumée Miracle - Éditions du Seuil
- 1974: Max Gallo, Un pas vers la mer - Éditions Robert Laffont
- 1975: Françoise Lefèvre, La Première Habitude - Jean-Jacques Pauvert
- 1976: Roger Boussinot, Vie et mort de Jean Chalosse - Robert Laffont
- 1977: Guyette Lyr, La Fuite en douce - Mercure de France
- 1978: Hortense Dufour, La Marie-Marraine - Grasset
- 1979: Jeanne Bourin, La Chambre des dames - La Table Ronde
- 1980: Marie-Thérèse Humbert, À l'autre bout de moi - Stock
- 1981: José-André Lacour, Le Rire de Caïn - La Table Ronde
- 1982: Clarisse Nicoïdski, Couvre-Feux - Ramsay
- 1983: Paul Savatier, Le Photographe - Gallimard
- 1984: Michel Ragon, Les Mouchoirs rouges de Cholet - Albin Michel
- 1985: Frédéric Rey, La Haute Saison - Flammarion
- 1986: François-Marie Banier, Balthazar, fils de famille - Gallimard
- 1987: Jack-Alain Léger, Wanderweg - Gallimard
- 1988: Kenizé Mourad, De la part de la princesse morte - Robert Laffont
- 1989: Charles Juliet, L'Année de l'éveil - Éditions P.O.L.
- 1990: Yves Beauchemin, Juliette Pomerleau - Éditions de Fallois.
- 1991: Claire Bonnafé, Le Guetteur immobile - Balland
- 1992: Nicolas Bréhal, Sonate au clair de Lune - Mercure de France
- 1993: Bernard Werber, Le Jour des fourmis - Albin Michel
- 1994: Gisèle Pineau, La Grande Drive des esprits - le Serpent à Plumes
- 1995: Paulo Coelho, L'Alchimiste (The Alchemist) - Anne Carrière
- 1996: Daniel Picouly, Le Champ de personne - Flammarion
- 1997: Élisabeth Gille, Un paysage de cendres - Seuil
- 1998: Tonino Benacquista, Saga - Gallimard
- 1999: Nancy Huston, L'Empreinte de l'ange - Actes Sud
- 2000: Catherine Cusset, Le Problème avec Jane - Gallimard.
- 2001: Éric-Emmanuel Schmitt, L'Évangile selon Pilate - Albin Michel.
- 2002: Isabelle Hausser, La Table des enfants - de Fallois
- 2003: William Boyd, À livre ouvert (Any Human Heart) - Seuil
- 2004: Philippe Claudel, Les Âmes grises - Stock.
- 2005: Philippe Grimbert, Un secret - Grasset
- 2006: Khaled Hosseini, Les Cerfs-volants de Kaboul (The Kite Runner) - Belfond
- 2007: Duong Thu Huong, Terre des oublis.
- 2008: Marie Sizun, La Femme de l'Allemand - Arléa.
- 2009: Claudie Gallay, Les Déferlantes - Éditions Rouergue.
- 2010: Véronique Ovaldé, Ce que je sais de Vera Candida - Éditions de l'Olivier.
- 2011: Kathryn Stockett, La Couleur des sentiments (The Help) - Éditions Jacqueline Chambon / Actes Sud.
- 2012: Delphine de Vigan, Rien ne s'oppose à la nuit - JC Lattès.
- 2013: Robert Goolrick, Arrive un vagabond (Heading Out to Wonderful) - Pocket.
- 2014: Laura Kasischke, Esprit d'hiver - Éditions Christian Bourgois.
- 2015: Anthony Marra for Une constellation de phénomènes vitaux - JC Lattès
- 2016: Jean-Luc Seigle for Je vous écris dans le noir - Flammarion
- 2017: Leïla Slimani for Chanson douce - Gallimard
- 2018: Anna Hope for La salle de bal - Gallimard
- 2019: (ex-aequo) Adeline Dieudonné for La vraie vie - éditions L’Iconoclaste
- 2019: (ex-aequo) Jesmyn Ward for Le Chant des revenants - éditions Belfond
- 2020: Claire Berest for Rien n'est noir - Stock
- 2021: Colum McCann for Apeirogon - Belfond

== Non-fiction (from 1977) ==
- 1992: Anne Borrel, Alain Senderens and Jean-Bernard Naudin: Proust, la cuisine retrouvée - Le Chêne
- 1993: Catherine Audard, Le Respect, de l'estime à la déférence: une question de limite - Autrement
- 1994: Alexandra Lapierre, Fanny Stevenson - Robert Laffont
- 1995: Henriette Walter, L'Aventure des langues en Occident - Robert Laffont
- 1996: Shusha Guppy, Un jardin à Téhéran - Éditions Phébus
- 1997: Serge Toubiana and Antoine de Baecque: François Truffaut - Gallimard
- 1998: Evelyne Bloch-Dano: Madame Zola - Grasset
- 1999: Laurent Greilsamer: Le Prince foudroyé, la vie de Nicolas de Staël - Fayard
- 2000: Sabine Melchior-Bonnetand, Aude de Tocqueville: Histoire de l'adultère - La Martinère
- 2001: François Bizot: Le Portail - La table Ronde.
- 2002: Wladyslaw Szpilman: Le Pianiste (The Pianist) - Robert Laffont.
- 2003: Jean-Pierre Perrin, Jours de poussière - Choses vues en Afghanistan - La Table ronde
- 2004: Fabienne Verdier, Passagère du silence - Albin Michel
- 2004: Anna Politkovskaya, Tchétchénie, le déshonneur russe (A Dirty War: A Russian Reporter in Chechnya) - Buchet/Chastel.
- 2005: Azar Nafisi, Lire Lolita à Téhéran (Reading Lolita in Tehran) - Plon
- 2006: Charles Dantzig, Dictionnaire égoïste de la littérature française - Grasset.
- 2007: Dominique Bona, Camille et Paul, la passion Claudel - Grasset.
- 2008: Wangari Maathai, Celle qui plante les arbres - Héloïse d'Ormesson.
- 2009: Jean-Paul Mari, Sans blessures apparentes - Robert Laffont
- 2010: Éric Fottorino, L'Homme qui m'aimait tout bas - Gallimard.
- 2011: Ex-aequo : Benjamin Stora with Tramor Quémeneur, Algérie 1954-1962 - Éditions Les Arènes / Anne-Marie Revol, Nos étoiles ont filé - Éditions Stock
- 2012: Helene Cooper, La Maison de Sugar Beach (The House at Sugar Beach) - Éditions Zoé.
- 2013: Rithy Panh, L’Élimination.
- 2014: Emmanuèle Bernheim, Tout s’est bien passé, Gallimard.
- 2015: Pauline Guéna and Guillaume Binet, L'Amérique des écrivains, Éditions Robert Laffont
- 2016: Marceline Loridan-Ivens for Et tu n’es pas revenu - Grasset
- 2017: Mathias Malzieu for Journal d'un vampire en pyjama - Editions Albin Michel
- 2018: Delphine Minoui for Les passeurs de livres de Daraya - Seuil
- 2019: Alex Marzano-Lesnevich for L’empreinte - éditions Sonatine
- 2020: Vanessa Springora for Consentement - Grasset
- 2021: David L. Carlson and Landis Blair for L'accident de chasse - éditions Sonatine

== Crime fiction (from 2002) ==
- 2002: Fred Vargas, Pars vite et reviens tard - Viviane Hamy.
- 2003: Harlan Coben, Ne le dis à personne (Tell No One) - Belfond
- 2004: Dennis Lehane, Shutter Island - Rivages
- 2005: Dominique Sylvain, Passage du désir - Viviane Hamy
- 2006: Mo Hayder, Tokyo - Presses de la cité.
- 2007: Arnaldur Indriðason, La Femme en vert - Graforþögn.
- 2008: Marcus Malte, Garden of Love - Zulma.
- 2009: Caryl Férey, Zulu - Gallimard
- 2010: Jesse Kellerman: Les Visages - Sonatine Éditions.
- 2011: Lisa Gardner, La Maison d'à côté - Sonatine Éditions
- 2012: Jussi Adler-Olsen, Miséricorde - Albin Michel.
- 2013: Gillian Flynn, Les Apparences (Gone Girl) - Sonatine.
- 2014: Ian Manook, Yeruldelgger - Albin Michel.
- 2015: Mechtild Borrmann, Le Violoniste - Éditions du Masque
- 2016: Jax Miller, Les Infâmes - Éditions Ombres noires
- 2017: Olivier Norek, Surtensions - Michel Lafon
- 2018: Eva Dolan, Les chemins de la haine - Éditions Liana Levi
- 2019: Franck Bouysse, Né d’aucune femme - Éditions La Manufacture des livres
- 2020: Tess Sharpe, Mon Territoire - Sonatine Éditions
- 2021: Dolores Redondo, La Face nord du cœur - Gallimard

== See also ==
- Elle magazine
