= Françoise Lefèvre =

French writer

Françoise Lefèvre (born 22 November 1942) is a French writer. She is a recipient of the Grand prix des lectrices de Elle.

== Biography ==
Françoise Lefèvre was born on 22 November 1942 in Paris. She made her debut in literature in 1974, and each of her books tells about the episodes of her life.

Les larmes de André Hardellet (1998) relates a unique encounter between the young novelist and the poet of La Cité Montgol on Place Desnouettes, south of the 15th arrondissement of Paris. On July 23, 1974, the sick and disenchanted poet met this young woman. The new friends planned a visit the next day in Vincennes, home town of Hardellet. It did not take place: the poet died during the night.

Her son Hugo Horiot, whose autism she mentioned in her book Le Petit Prince Cannibale, published an account of his condition (Asperger syndrome) in 2013: L'empereur, c'est moi.

== Works ==
- 1974: La Première Habitude, Éditions Pauvert, ISBN 2290303836, Grand prix des lectrices de Elle, 1975
- 1976: L'Or des chambres, J.-J. Pauvert, ISBN 2268042596
- 1977: Le Bout du compte, J.-J. Pauvert
- 1985: Mortel Azur, Éditions Mazarine, ISBN 2290303844
- 1990: Le Petit Prince Cannibale, Actes Sud, ISBN 978-2868695642

- Prix Goncourt des lycéens, 1990

- 1993: Blanche, c'est moi, Actes Sud, ISBN 2868699154
- 1994: La Grosse, Actes Sud, ISBN 2742727736
- 1994: Hermine, Stock
- 1995: Surtout ne me dessine pas un mouton, Stock, ISBN 2234044642
- 1997: Un soir sans raison, Éditions du Rocher, ISBN 2268026590
- 1998: Consigne des minutes heureuses, Éditions du Rocher, ISBN 2290302945
- 1998: Les Larmes d'André Hardellet, Éditions du Rocher, ISBN 2268031012
- 2000: Souliers d'automne, Éditions du Rocher, ISBN 2268037479
- 2000: En nous des choses tues, Éditions du Rocher, ISBN 2268037029
- 2001: L'Offrande, Éditions du Rocher, ISBN 2268040267
- 2003: Alma ou la chute des feuilles, Éditions du Rocher, ISBN 2268043223
- 2004: Se perdre avec les ombres, Éditions du Rocher, ISBN 2268051897, Prix Marcel Aymé, 2005
- 2008: Un album de silence, Mercure de France, ISBN 271522849X

== Prizes ==
- 1975: Grand prix des lectrices de Elle for La Première Habitude.
- 1990: Prix Goncourt des lycéens for Le Petit Prince cannibale.

== Bibliography ==
- Pierre Perrin, Les caresses de l'absence chez Françoise Lefèvre, Éditions du Rocher, 1998.
- Sabine Bourgois, Une autre que moi, K Éditions, 2004.

Prix "A la découverte d'un écrivain du Nord" 2005, bestowed by the Furet du Nord bookstore and the daily La Voix du Nord.
