= National Federation of Energy and Mines =

Trade union of France

The National Federation of Energy and Mines (French: Fédération nationale de l'énergie et des mines, FNEM) is a trade union representing workers in the energy industry, and coal miners, in France.

The union was established on 20 June 2000, when the Miners' Federation merged with the National Federation of Energy and Gas. Like its predecessors, it affiliated to Workers' Force. It was initially led by Gabriel Gaudy. It is based in Paris.
