= Le Mesnil-le-Roi =

- Commune
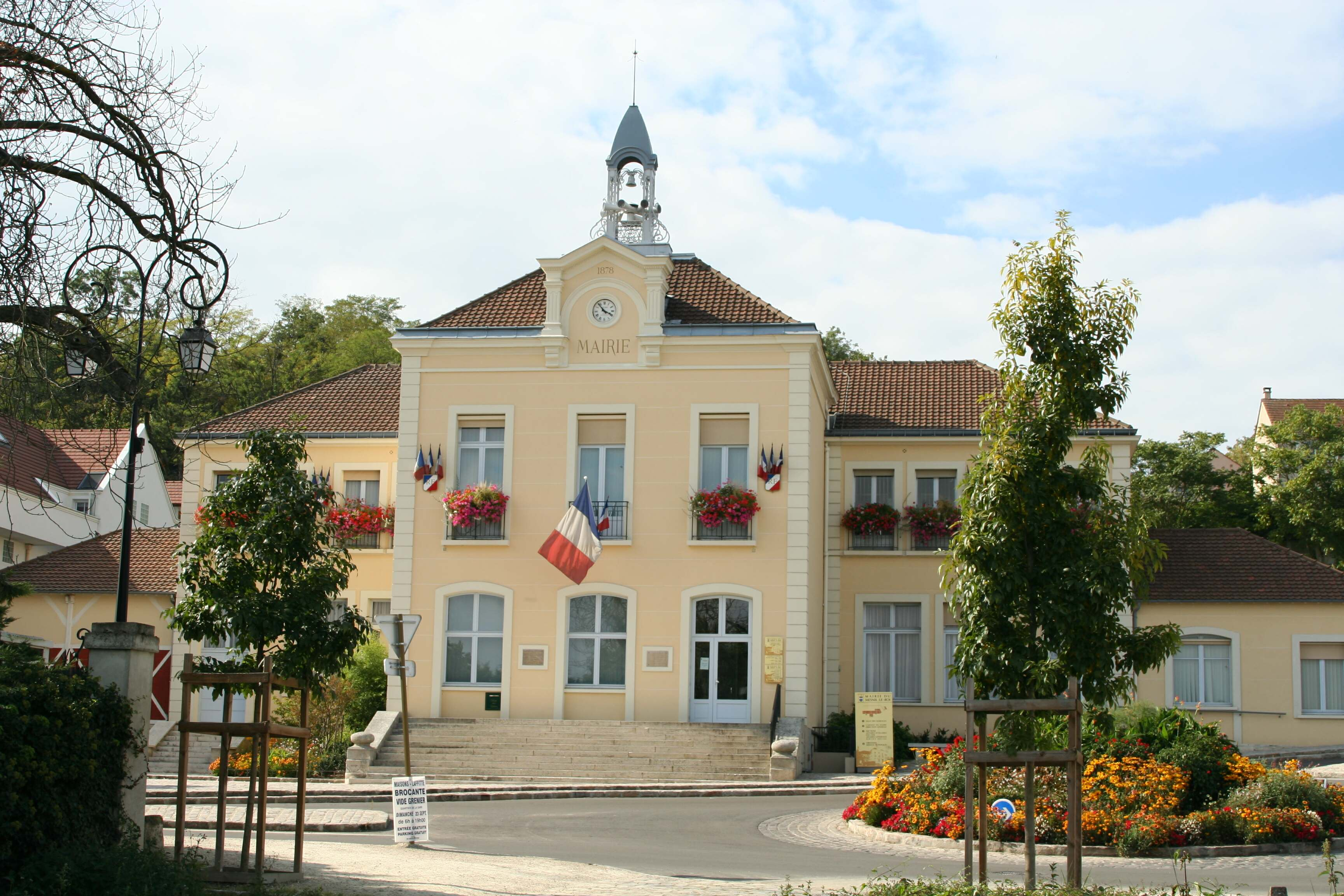
- Town hall

- Coat of arms
- Location of Le Mesnil-le-Roi
- Location within France Location within Île-de-France (region)
- Coordinates: 48°56′15″N 2°07′39″E
- Country: France
- Region: Île-de-France
- Department: Yvelines
- Arrondissement: Saint-Germain-en-Laye
- Canton: Sartrouville
- Intercommunality: CA Saint Germain Boucles Seine

Government
  - Mayor (2026–32): Aline Billet
- Area^{1}: 3.27 km^{2} (1.26 sq mi)
- Elevation: 42 m (138 ft)
- Highest elevation: 71 m (233 ft)
- Lowest elevation: 20 m (66 ft)
- Population (2023): 6,332
  - Density: 1,940/km^{2} (5,020/sq mi)
- Time zone: UTC+01:00 (CET)
  - Summer (DST): UTC+02:00 (CEST)
- INSEE/Postal code: 78396 /78600
- ^{1} French Land Register data, which excludes lakes, ponds, glaciers > 1 km^{2} (0.386 sq mi or 247 acres) and river estuaries.

Le Mesnil-le-Roi (French pronunciation: [lə menil lə ʁwa]) is a commune in the Yvelines department in the Île-de-France region in north-central France. It is about 3.5 km (2 mi) from Saint-Germain-en-Laye.

The name "Mesnil" comes from Latin: mansionilis meaning "little estate". The name "Le Mesnil-le-Roi" could be said "The King's small estate" (Francis I). On the other hand, the name of Mesnil-le-Roi in the time of the French Revolution was Le Mesnil-Carrières, "Mesnil quarries".

The inhabitants are called Mesnilois (male) and Mesniloise (female).

== Geography ==
Le Mesnil-le-Roi is situated between the Forest of Saint-Germain-en-Laye and the left bank of the River Seine. It is bordered by Maisons-Laffitte to the north, Le Pecq to the south and Saint-Germain-en-Laye to the west. To the east, the Seine separates it from Montesson. The communal land includes an equal part of an island in the Seine, the Île de la Borde.

Outside the town, conjoining with Maisons-Laffitte, the commune includes a second major estate, Carrières-sous-Bois.

The commune is crossed in its southern part by the A14 autoroute, partly underground. This autoroute crosses the Seine on a viaduct of reinforced concrete, forming two parallel bridges.

== History ==
=== Heraldry ===
Arms of Le Mesnil-le-Roi	The arms of Le Mesnil-le-Roi are blazoned : Azure, two spurs fesswise lower one contourny undersole straps one against the other intertwined in pale rowelled and buckled Or, and on a chief argent a salamander gules between two fleur-de-lis Or.

This coat of arms, adopted in 1952, derives from the La Salle family, the ancient landowners of Carrières-sous-Bois, and it was given to them by Francis I.

== Administration ==
List of successive mayors
Election date	Name
Missing results before 2001 are no longer known.
March 2008	Marc Demeure
March 2001	Marc Demeure
May 1995	Marc Demeure
March 1971	Henri-Georges Dupret-Ecuyer

== Demography ==
Historical population
Year	Pop.	±% p.a.
1968	5,473	—
1975	5,680	+0.53%
1982	5,557	−0.31%
1990	6,206	+1.39%
1999	6,207	+0.00%
2007	6,401	+0.39%
2012	6,383	−0.06%
2017	6,292	−0.29%
2023	6,332	+0.11%
Source: INSEE

== Culture ==
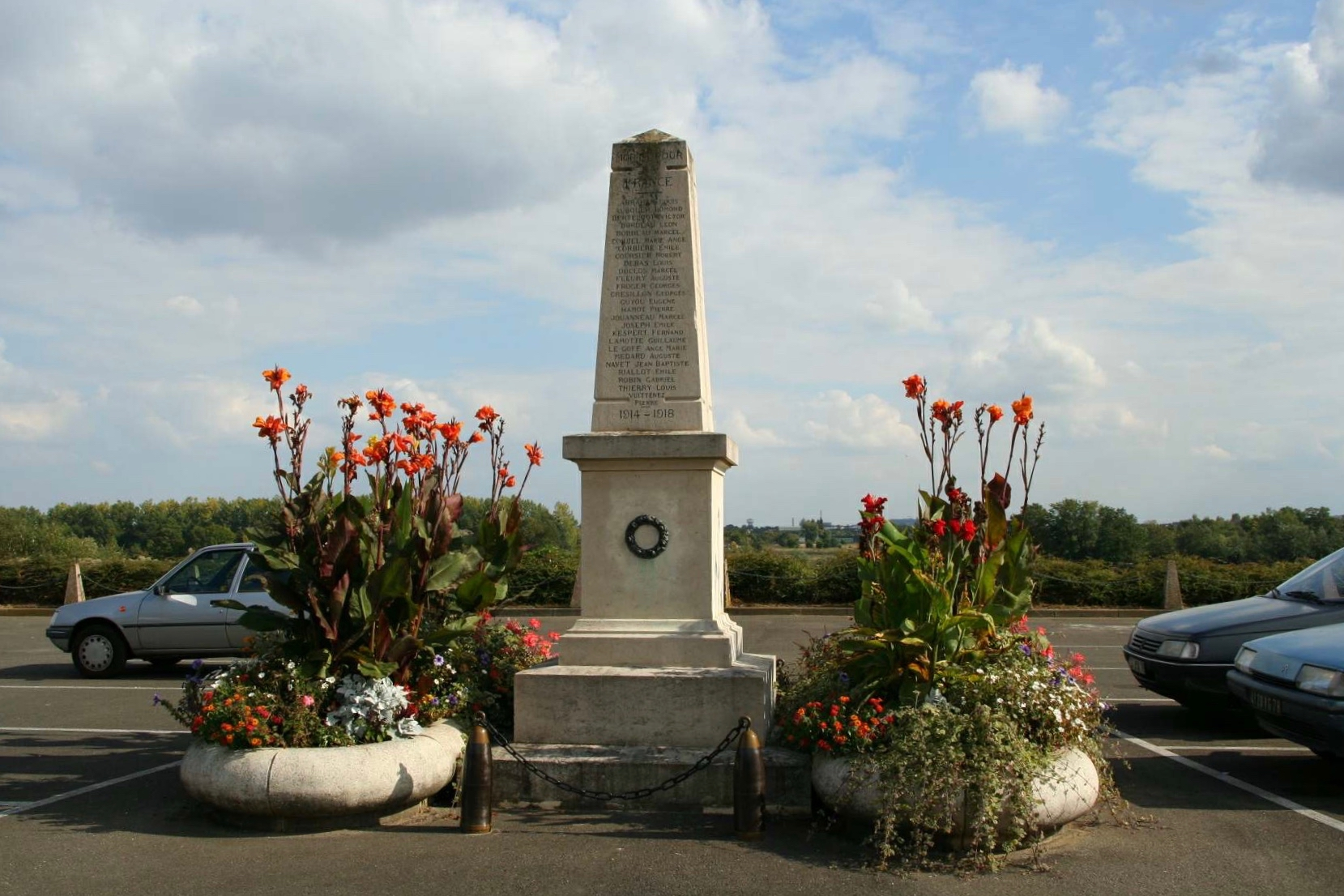
War memorial

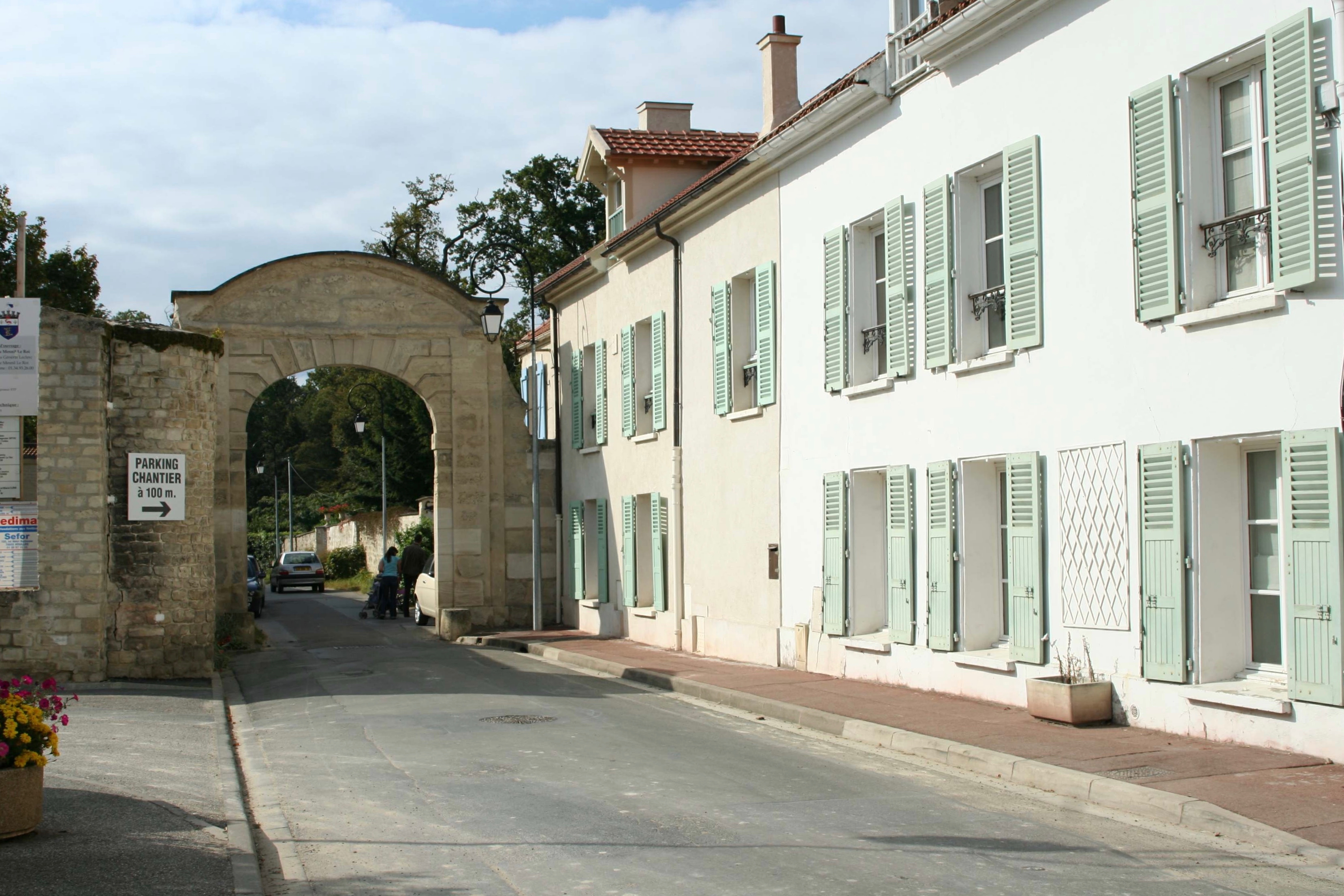
Forest Gate

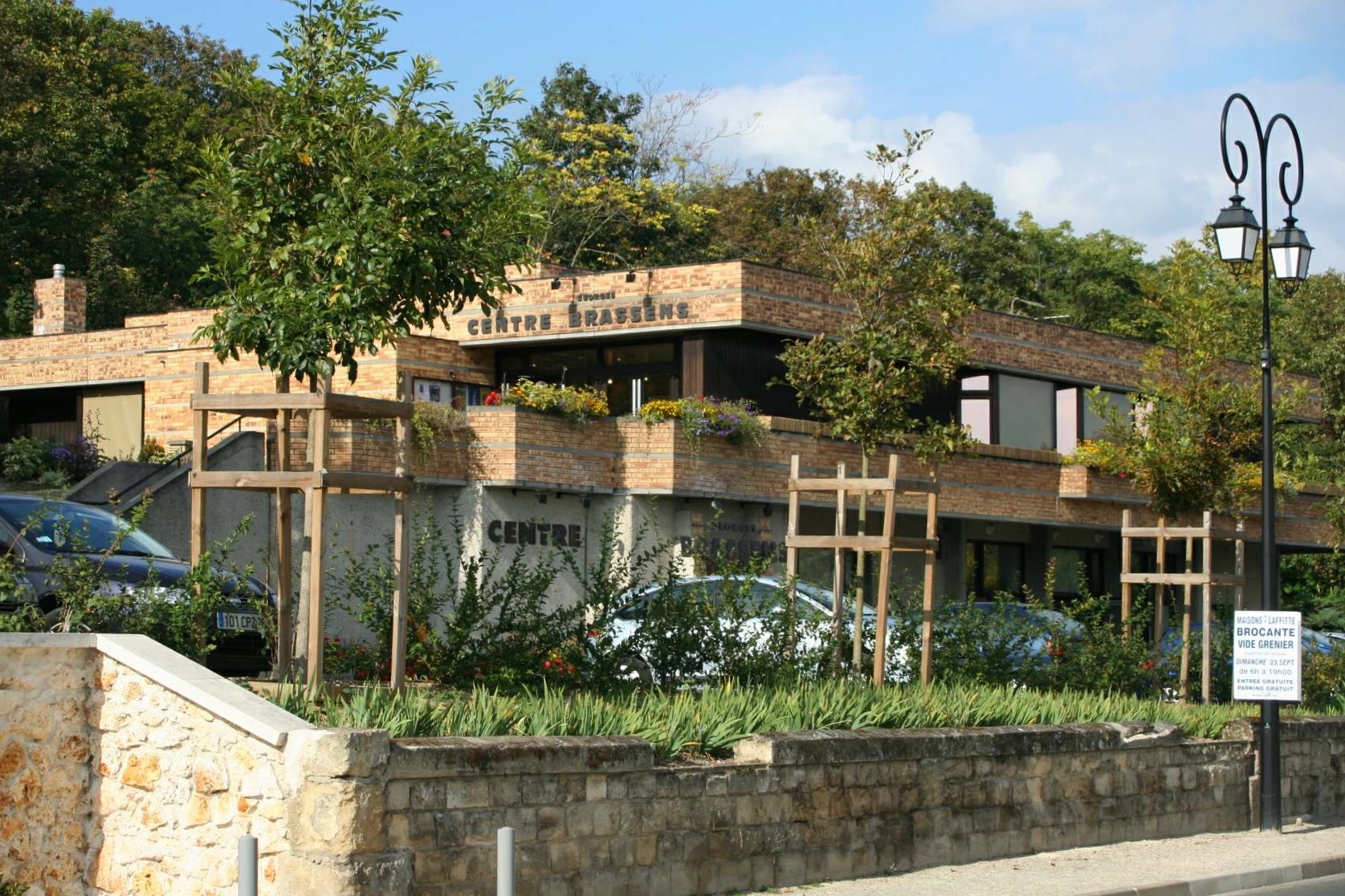
Brassens Centre

The town participates in a Concours des villes et villages fleuris ("Towns and Villages in Bloom" competition) and in 2007 won two flowers.

=== Monuments ===
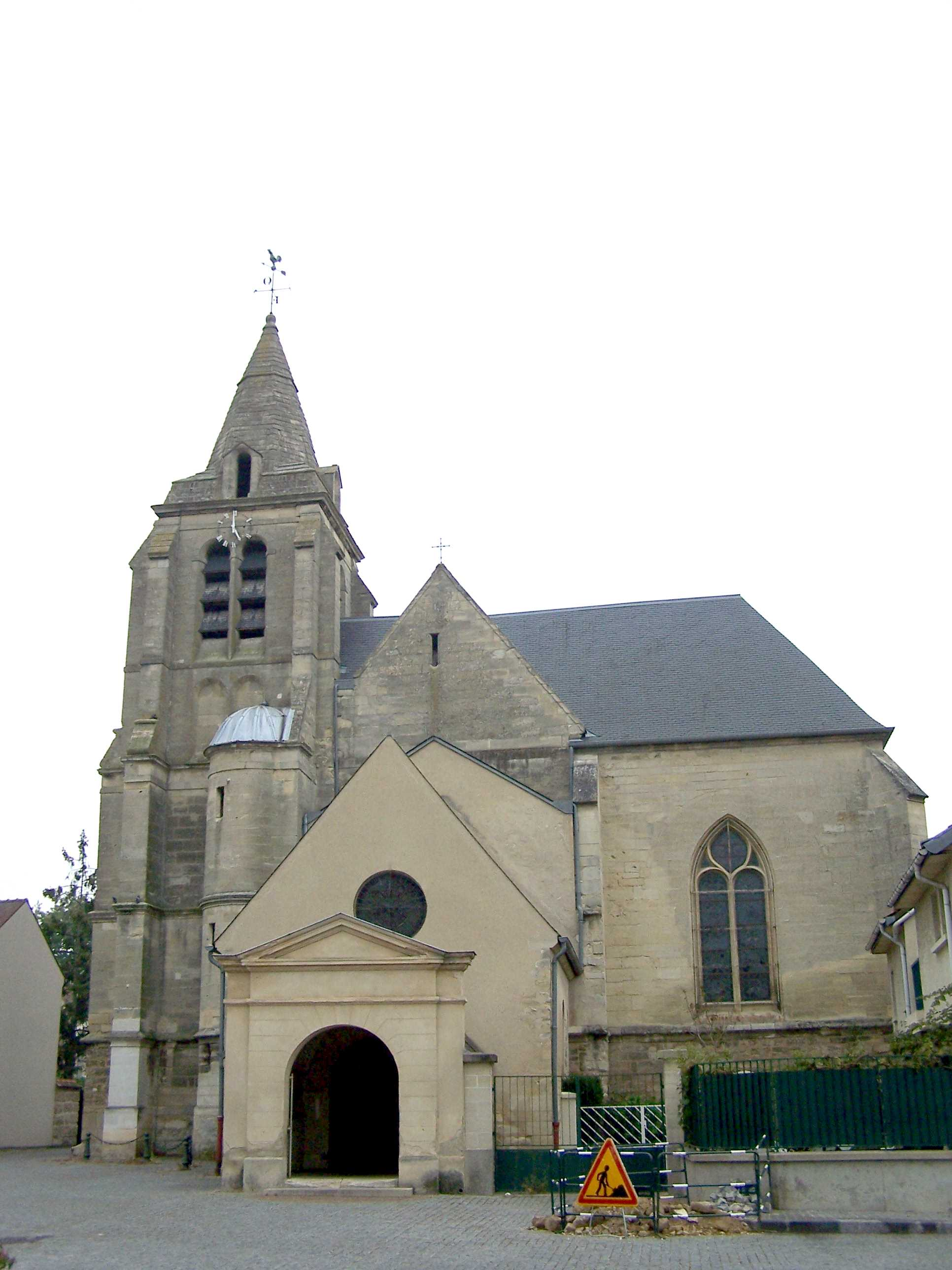
Church of St Vincent

- Church of St Vincent: Church in the Flamboyant Gothic style, consecrated on 2 August 1587
- Château du Val, 17th Century, situated on the edge of the Forest of Saint-Germain-en-Laye, built by the architect Jules Hardouin-Mansart.
- The Orangery of the Château du Mesnil, situated in a protected zone of POS ND-EBC (Non-cultivable woodland)) which has been converted to 43 private houses
- Old abandoned mineshafts (Château du Mesnil, now demolished), situated on the edge of the Orangery on the Rue de Général Leclerc
- Artificial caves (abandoned), ancient glaciers (abandoned) and ruins of canals (now abandoned) in the communal woodlands (Château du Mesnil, now demolished).

=== Twin towns ===
England: Newmarket, Suffolk

=== Famous people ===
- Émile Littré, bought a house in Mesnil-le-Roi, which he styled "Ménil-le-Roi," in 1847, and stayed there until his death in 1881; it was here that he did the bulk of his work on his great Dictionnaire de la langue française (1872; supplement 1877)
- Augustin Henry-Lepaute, watchmaker
- Jacques Fath, tailor, born in Mesnil-le-Roi in 1912
- Serge Gainsbourg, until then Lucien Ginsburg, married Élisabeth Levitsky at Mesnil-le-Roi Town Hall on 3 November 1951. He worked at this time at the Maison Champsfleur (actually an old people's home) as an assistant to young Israeli children whose parents were victims of the Holocaust.
- Jeanne Bourin, novelist and media personality
- Louis Pauwels, journalist
- Jules Rein, Politician, mayor of Mesnil-le-Roi, originator of the canton of Maisons-Laffitte – Le Mesnil-le-Roi – Houilles.

== Economy ==
- Residential community.

== See also ==
- Dennaud, Josianne (1998), Sutton, Alan (ed.), Le Mesnil-Le-Roi, Mémoire en Images, ISBN 2-84253-194-9
- Communes of the Yvelines department
