= Charles Juliet =

French poet, playwright and novelist (1934–2024)

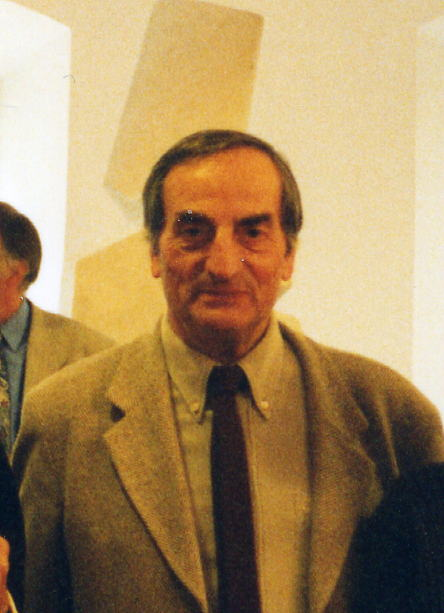
Juliet in 1999

Charles Juliet (30 September 1934 – 26 July 2024) was a French poet, playwright and novelist. He won the 2013 Prix Goncourt de la Poésie.

His works have been translated into German, Spanish, Italian, English, Polish, Japanese, Vietnamese, Turkish, Korean, and Chinese, etc...

== Biography ==
After his mother was sent to a psychiatry ward due to suicidal attempts, Juliet was brought up by a family of Swiss peasants. At age 12, he went to school in Aix-en-Provence and at 20 he went on to study in Lyon. Three years later he dropped out and took to writing.

Fifteen years later he published his first book, Fragments, with a preface by Georges Haldas. During that time he also met with other artists, namely Michel Leiris, Raoul Ubac, Bram van Velde, Pierre Soulages, and Samuel Beckett.

Juliet resided in Lyon. He died on 26 July 2024, at the age of 89.

"Lambeaux" is currently on the syllabus for the French Baccalaureate.

== Bibliography ==
- Au long de la spirale, (1975)
- Pages de pierre, (1977)
- La Plus Fragile, (1977)
- Croissances, (1978)
- Pages de journal, (1978)
- Vers la rencontre, (1980)
- Reviens à ta solitude, (1983)
- Convergences, (1984)
- La lente montée (1984)
- Lettre suit, (1985)
- La Soif, (1987)
- Tes yeux blessés, (1987)
- Entretien avec Pierre Soulages, (1987)
- Accords, (1987)
- La vie affleure, (1989)
- Tant de chemins, (1989)
- L'Année de l'éveil, (1989), Grand prix des lectrices de Elle
- Affûts, (1990)
- Dans la lumière des saisons, (1991)
- Le Don de présence, (1992)
- Bribes pour un double, (1992)
- Ce pays du silence, (1992)
- Jean Reverzy, (1992)
- L'Inattendu, (1992)
- Tu avives, (1993)
- Telluriennes, (1993)
- Cette flamme claire,(1994)
- Ce chemin, (1994)
- Carnets de Saorge, (1994)
- Entretien avec Raoul Ubac, (1994)
- Accueils - Journal 4 (1982-1988), (1994)
- Ce foyer secret, (1995)
- Césire, n°4, (1995)
- En amont, (1995)
- Giacometti, (1995)
- Failles, (1995)
- Lambeaux, (1995)
- A voix basse, (1997)
- Lueur après labour - Journal 3 (1968-1981), (1997)
- Traversée de nuit - Journal 2 (1965-1968), (1997)
- Creuser, (1998)
- La Mue, (1998)
- Ferveur, (1998)
- Fouilles, (1998)
- L'Autre Chemin, (1998)
- Rencontres avec Bram van Velde, (1998)
- La Traversée, (1999)
- Ecarte la nuit, (1999)
- Rencontres avec Samuel Beckett, (1999)
- Chez François Dilasser, (1999)
- Attente en automne, (1999)
- Galet, (2000)
- Un lourd destin, (2000)
- Ténèbres en terre froide - Journal 1 (1957-1964), (2000)
- La Vague, (2001)
- Invite le vent, (2002)
- Une joie secrète, (2002)
- Eclats (2002)
- Te rejoindre, (2002)
- L'Incessant, (2002)
- L'Autre Faim, (2003)
- Notules, (2005)
- Ces bruits du monde extérieur, (2005)
- Les Autoportraits de Jean-Michel Marchetti, (2005)
- Au pays du long nuage blanc, (2005)
- T.R.U.P.H.E.M.U.S, (2006)
- L'opulence de la nuit, (2006)
- D'une rive à l'autre, (2006)
- Un jour, (2006)
- L'absente, (2007)
- Etty Hillesum, la fille qui ne savait pas prier, (2007)
- Moisson, Choix de poèmes, (2012)
- Gratitude, Journal IX 2004-2008, (2017)
- Rencontres avec Bram Van Velde, Nouvelle Édition Augmentée, (2020)
