= François Hilsum =

French political activist (1929–2020)

- Born: 26 January 1929; Paris, France
- Died: 16 March 2020 (aged 91)
- Occupations: Political activist Journalist

François Hilsum (26 January 1929 – 16 March 2020) was a French political activist and journalist.

== Biography ==
Hilsum came from a family of communist activists. His father, René Hilsum, was a bookseller, and his mother, Marcelle Grandjux, was a painter. His brother, Gérard, was part of Undersecretary of State for Coal Auguste Lecœur's cabinet. His grandmother was a revolutionary activist and his great-uncle served as Vice-President of the Second International.

Hilsum joined the French Resistance in 1943, and became a part of the French Communist Party in April 1945.

Hilsum became a member of the national office of the Union of French Republican Youth in 1953. He joined the Union of Communist Youth in 1956. He became national secretary of the Mouvement Jeunes Communistes de France in 1967.

First a boilermaker, Hilsum was also a painter and film director. He was in charge of photography for the newspaper L'Humanité, of which he was deputy director from 1980 to 1989. He also served as editor-in-chief of L'Humanité Dimanche.

He served as General Councillor of the canton of Sartrouville from 1973 to 1985, and Vice-President of the General Council of Yvelines from 1975 to 1981.

Starting in 1992, Hilsum revived his youthful passion of journalism. From 13 to 24 July 2017, he exhibited his works at the Orangerie du Sénat in the Jardin du Luxembourg. He titled his display Arpenteur d'Imaginaires.

François Hilsum died on 16 March 2020 at the age of 91.
