= Marcel Paul =

Trade unionist, Communist politician (1900–1982)

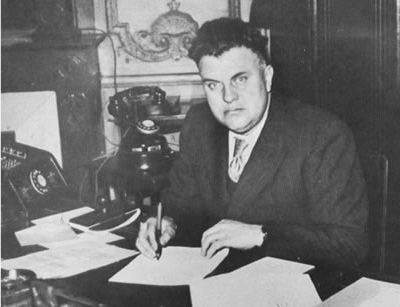

Député
- In office 1945–1948
- Constituency: Haute-Vienne

Personal details
- Born: 12 July 1900 Paris, France
- Died: 11 November 1982 (aged 82) Paris, France
- Party: French Communist Party (PCF)

Marcel Paul (French pronunciation: [maʁsɛl pɔl]; 12 July 1900 – 11 November 1982) was a French trade unionist and communist politician. He was also a Nazi concentration camp survivor and later served as a member of the French parliament.

== Biography ==
Marcel Paul was a foundling. His birthday is given as 12 July 1900, the date he was found in the 14th arrondissement in Paris. He began working at age 13, and became politically active at the age of 15 with socialist youth against the war.

He was conscripted into the navy, where he joined the sailors who refused to be a strikebreaker against striking workers at the Saint-Nazaire power station. At his discharge, he settled first at Saint-Quentin, Aisne, then Paris, where he worked as an electrician. In 1923, he left the French socialist party and in 1927, joined the French Communist Party (PCF), becoming close to Maurice Thorez, though he maintained his union ties.

He was conscripted into the army in 1939 during the Phoney War. Paul was taken prisoner by the Nazis, but managed to escape and fled to Brittany, where he established contact with the PCF and its regional leader, Auguste Havez. Paul joined Havez to form a branch of the party aiming to integrate the Resistance. In November 1940, he returned to Paris and led an insurgent group, the PCF's Organisation Spéciale ("Special Organization"), while creating connections with the trade unions. The Organisation Spécial was later renamed FTP-MOI),

Paul organized an attack against Hermann Göring, but it failed. He was denounced and arrested on 13 November 1941 and tortured by Prefecture of Police Special Brigadesmen in the police station of Saint-Denis. First held in Fontevraud-l'Abbaye, he was transferred to Blois and delivered to the Germans. He was then taken to Compiègne and subsequently deported to Auschwitz concentration camp and Buchenwald. While at Buchenwald, he took part in the April 1945 insurrection. Paul also helped save the life of many inmates, including the industrialist Marcel Dassault, who later became an important financial backer of the PCF newspaper L'Humanité. As a prominent prisoner of the Buchenwald concentration camp, Marcel Paul spoke at the liberation celebrations at the Buchenwald National Memorial in the German Democratic Republic (GDR).

After the liberation of France, he became Minister of Industrial Production of the interim government under Charles de Gaulle. He voted for nationalization of electricity and natural gas on April 8, 1946, creating Électricité de France and Gaz de France. He was deputy leader of the PCF in Haute-Vienne at the Second Constituent National Assembly and served in the French National Assembly from 1945 to 1948, when he resigned. Paul was on the Central Committee of the PCF from 1945 to 1964.

Paul was named an officer of the French Legion of Honor in April 1982. After the ceremony on 11 November 1982 at the Place de l'Étoile in Paris, Paul was taken ill and died at his home a few hours later.

== Legacy ==
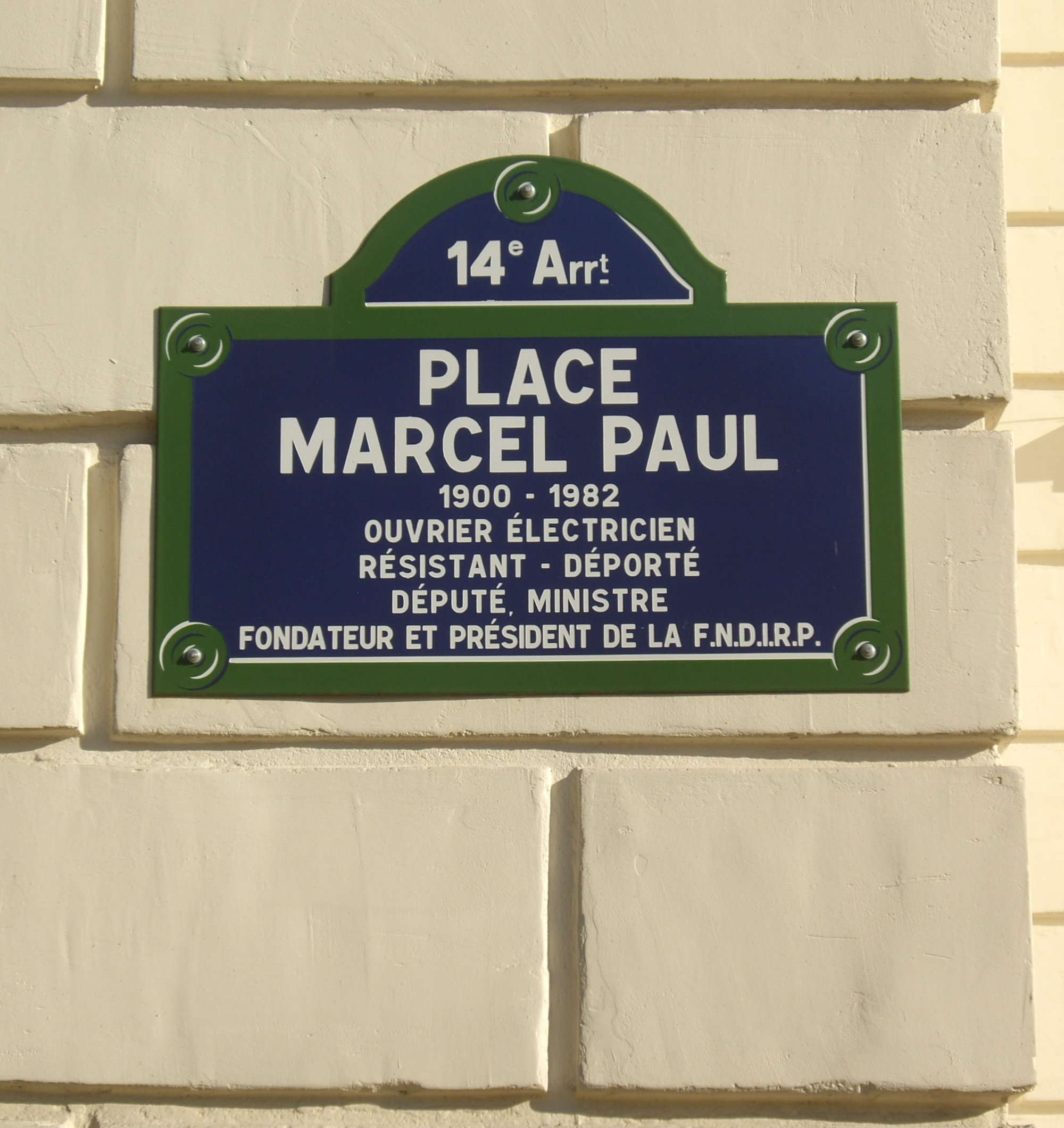
Plaque marking square named for Marcel-Paul in Paris

The great hall of the labour council in Saint-Denis bears his name, as well as a number of streets in various cities in France, including in the 14th arrondissement in Paris. Many streets, avenues, squares, halls and tramway stations bear his name. A stele paying tribute to him has been erected on the cliff top overlooking the Flamanville nuclear site (Manche). In 1992 the French Post Office issued a postage stamp in tribute to his memory.

== Post-mortem controversy ==
Two years after Paul's death, a controversy arose concerning his activities in Buchenwald. Laurent Wetzel, a CDS politician from Sartrouville, wrote an article in which he explained his refusal to support renaming a local street after Paul. He accused Paul of having cooperated with the internal management at the camp, thereby having determined the fate (the death) of a number of prisoners and he accused Paul of having given greater priority to the interests of his party. The Association Dora-Buchenwald and the Fédération nationale des déportés et internés résistants et patriotes filed a libel suit. The trial was held in Versailles and heard testimony from a number of former concentration camp prisoners. Wetzel was acquitted but the court refused to rule on the historical truth. A similar accusation had been raised against Paul in 1946.

Trade union offices
| Preceded by Lucien Barthes | General Secretary of the National Federation of Energy; 1937–1941 | Succeeded by Émile Pasquier |
| Preceded by Émile Pasquier | General Secretary of the National Federation of Energy; 1956–1963 | Succeeded by Roger Pauwels |
