= National Federation of Energy =

Trade union of France

The National Federation of Energy (French: Fédération nationale de l'énergie, FNE-CGT) was a trade union representing workers in the energy industry, in France.

The union was founded in 1905 as the National Federation of Lighting Workers, affiliated to the General Confederation of Labour (CGT), and mostly represented gas workers. In 1919, it was joined by various unions representing electrical workers, which had previously been part of the National Federation of Metalworkers, and was renamed the National Federation of Lighting and Motive Force Workers'. Following lengthy debates, the union decided not to affiliate to the Red Trade Union International.

The union split in 1939 into legal and underground wings, with the underground wing soon becoming the larger. The legal wing was largely supportive of the Vichy government until 1943, enabling a reunification in September 1944, largely on the terms of the underground wing. In 1946, the union played an important role in the campaign for the nationalisation of the electricity and gas industries. In 1947, the right wing of the union split away, to form the National Federation of Trade Unions of the Electric and Gas Industries.

In 1989, the National Union of Atomic Energy Trade Unions joined the union. In 1999, it merged with the National Federation of Miners, forming the National Federation of Mines and Energy.

== General secretaries ==
- 1905: Maurice Claverie
- 1906: Unknown
- 1919: E. Jacquot
- 1921: Charles Biot
- 1936: Charles Biot and Raoul Lèbre
- 1936: Lucien Barthes
- 1937: Marcel Paul
- 1941: Émile Pasquier
- 1942: Fernand Gambier
- 1946: Émile Pasquier
- 1956: Marcel Paul
- 1963: Roger Pauwels
- 1979: François Duteil
- 1989: Denis Cohen
