= National Federation of Mines and Energy =

Trade union of France

The National Federation of Mines and Energy (French: Fédération nationale des mines et de l'énergie, FNME) is a trade union representing workers in the energy and mining industries, in France.

The union was founded in 1999, when the National Federation of Miners merged with the National Federation of Energy. Like its predecessors, it is affiliated to the General Confederation of Labour (CGT). On formation, the union had 91,000 members, making it the largest CGT member, but this figure has fallen, as employment in the sectors has dropped. The union has three sections: gas and electric, mines, and atomic energy.

== General Secretaries ==
1999: Denis Cohen
2003: Frédéric Imbrecht
2010: Virginie Gensel
