= Jean-Luc Seigle =

French writer (1956–2020)

Jean-Luc Seigle (1956 – 5 March 2020) was a French contemporary dramatist, screenwriter and writer.

== Biography ==
In January 2015 is published his book Je vous écris dans le noir which is devoted to Pauline Dubuisson at the center of a criminal case of the 1950s. Fabienne Pascaud, in the magazine Télérama writes:

Jean-Luc Seigle chose to make out of the sombre fact a fascinating narrative in the first person and slips masterfully into the skin of his heroine

and that he

knows how to express the feminine with a troubling empathy."

== Novels ==
- 2001: La Nuit dépeuplée, Paris, Flammarion, ISBN 978-2259194464
- 2004: Le Sacre de l'enfant mort, Flammarion, ISBN 978-2259199957:
- 2006: Laura ou l'Énigme des vingt-deux lames, Paris, M. Lafon, ISBN 978-2749904757
- 2012: En vieillissant les hommes pleurent, Flammarion, ISBN 9782081257610

Grand prix RTL-Lire 2012. - Prix Octave Mirbeau 2013.

- 2015: Je vous écris dans le noir; Flammarion, ISBN 2081292408 – devoted to Pauline Dubuisson; Grand prix des lectrices de Elle

== Scripts ==
for cinema

- 1994: Pourquoi maman est dans mon lit ? by Patrick Malakian
- 1998: The Carriers Are Waiting by Benoît Mariage

for television (partial list)

- Week-end
- Le Serment de Mado
- 1995: La Veuve de l'architecte by Philippe Monnier
- 1996: Terre indigo by Jean Sagols
- 1997: Un homme digne de confiance by Philippe Monnier
- 1997: L'Ami de mon fils by Marion Sarraut
- 1999: La Vérité vraie by Fabrice Cazeneuve
- 2000: Joséphine, ange gardien by Nicolas Cuche (1 Episode)
- 2006: Laura by Jean-Teddy Filippe
- 2007: Le Réveillon des bonnes by Michel Hassan

As well as twenty others in collaboration.

== Theatre ==
- 1981: Le Songe, Festival du Marais
- 1983: L'Absent, Théâtre Marie Stuart
- 1990: Marie Ignota, Théâtre Ouvert
- 2008: La Gouvernante de Sigmaringen
- 2009: La Dernière Nuit de Mona Parker
- 2011: Médée et le Truc en plume
- 2012: Excusez-moi pour la poussière
