= Claire Bonnafé =

French writer and painter

Claire Bonnafé is a French writer and painter.

== Works ==
- 1977: Le Bruit de la mer, Éditions Balland, ISBN 2715801149
- 1990: Le Guetteur immobile, Éditions Balland, ISBN 2253059862, Grand prix des lectrices de Elle 1991
- 1997: Une lumière dans l'île, Éditions du Seuil, ISBN 2020323508

== Prizes ==
- Prix of the Société des gens de lettres for Le Bruit de la mer
- Grand prix des lectrices de Elle for Le Guetteur immobile
