= Miners' Federation (France) =

Trade union of France

The Miners' Federation (French: Fédération des Mineurs) was a trade union representing mineworkers in France.

== History ==
In 1947, the General Confederation of Labour (CGT) suffered a major split, with those on the right of the federation leaving to form the rival Workers' Force. The National Federation of Miners, a CGT affiliate, did not leave, but a minority led by assistant general secretary Noël Sinot split to form the Miners' Federation, which was constituted in 1948.

By 1960, the union claimed 21,000 members. In 1963, it worked with the French Confederation of Christian Workers to lead a major strike. Membership of the union fell in line with employment in the industry, and in 2000, the union merged with the National Federation of Energy and Gas, to form the National Federation of Energy and Mines. The new union created an affiliate, the General Union of Mines, to represent former members of the Miners' Federation.

== General Secretaries ==
1948: Noël Sinot
1961: André Augard
1968: Charles Cortot
1980: René Mertz
1993: Roland Houp
1999: Bernard Fraysse
