= National Insurance =

Tax and social benefit system in the UK, introduced in 1911

National Insurance (NI) is a form of tax charged in the United Kingdom on employees, self-employed people and employers. Payment of this tax is usually referred to as a National Insurance Contribution (NIC). National Insurance is the Government of the United Kingdom's second-biggest source of revenue.

National Insurance is connected to the welfare state in the United Kingdom, since payment of NI contributions establishes entitlement to certain state benefits for workers and their families. The benefit component includes several contributory benefits, availability and amount of which is determined by the claimant's contribution record and circumstances. Weekly income and some lump-sum benefits are provided for participants upon death, retirement, unemployment, maternity and disability. In order to obtain the benefits which are related to the contributions, a National Insurance number is necessary.

Introduced by the National Insurance Act 1911 and expanded by the Attlee ministry in 1948, the system has been subjected to numerous amendments in succeeding years. Initially, it was a contributory form of insurance against illness and unemployment, and eventually provided retirement pensions and other benefits.

Currently, workers pay contributions from the age of sixteen years until the age they become eligible for the State Pension. NI Contributions are due from employed people earning above a threshold called the Primary Threshold, the value of which is reviewed each year; earnings between the Lower Earnings Limit and the Primary Threshold are credited as if contributions had been paid. Self-employed people contribute through a percentage of net profits above a threshold, which is reviewed periodically. Contributions are collected by HM Revenue and Customs (HMRC). For employees, this is done through the PAYE (pay-as-you-earn) system along with income tax, repayments of student loans and any apprenticeship levy which the employer is liable to pay. Individuals may also make voluntary NI Contributions to fill a gap in their contributions record and thus protect their entitlement to benefits.

== History ==
=== Creation ===
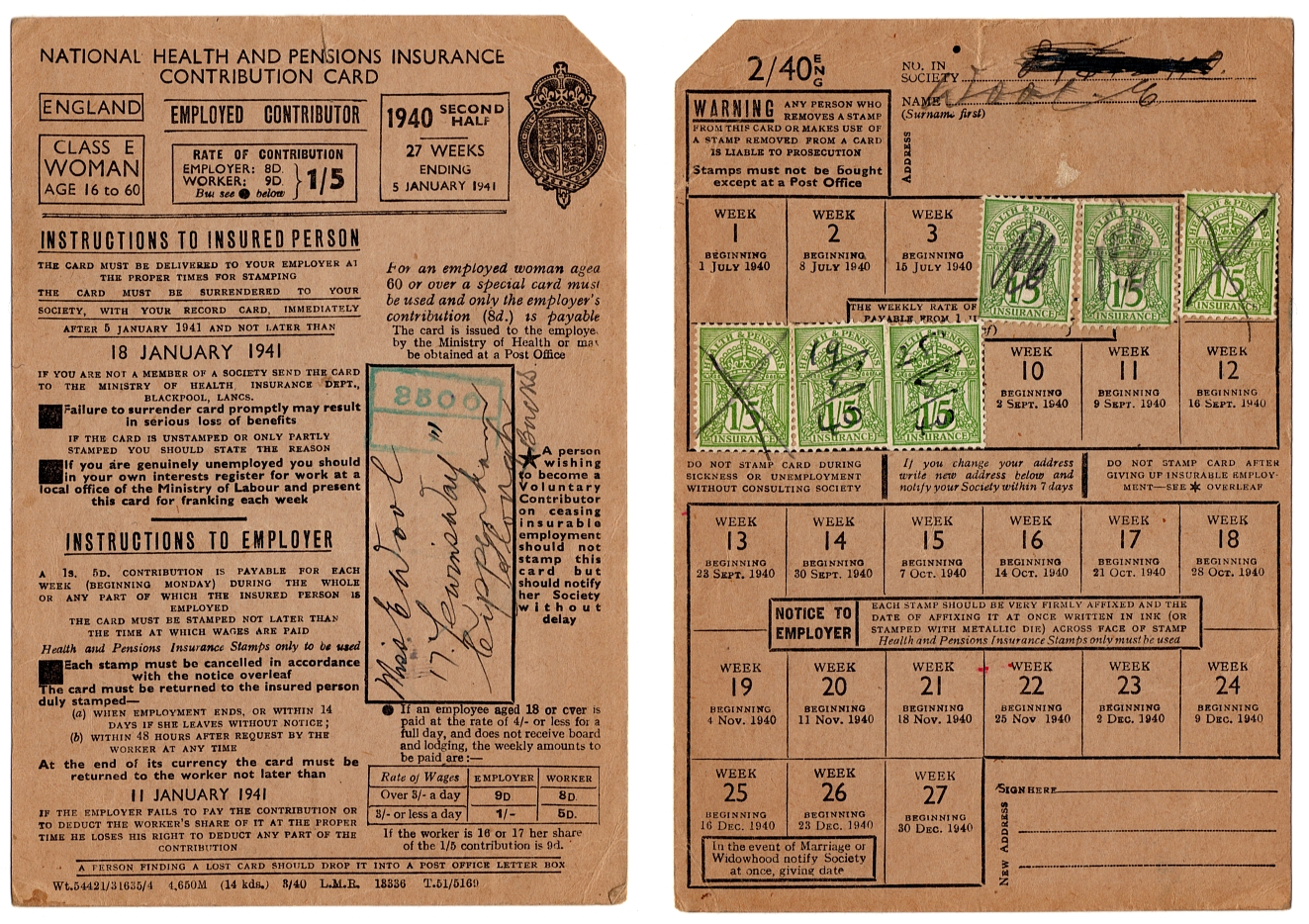
A 1940 contribution card for an employed woman

In the 1860s, proposals were made for a “State Friendly Society” linked to the Post Office. Historians Philip Corrigan and Derek Sayer identify among them an 1868 scheme by the Rev. John Young Stratton for insurance for the wage-paid classes through the Post Office.

The current system of National Insurance has its roots in the National Insurance Act 1911, which introduced the concept of benefits based on contributions paid by employed people and their employer. William Martin-Smith was issued with the First NI number A1. The chosen means of recording the contributions required the employer to buy special stamps from a Post Office and affix them to contribution cards. The cards formed proof of entitlement to benefits and were given to the employee when the employment ended, leading to the loss of a job often being referred to as being given your cards, a phrase which endures to this day although the card itself no longer exists.

Initially there were two schemes running alongside each other, one for health and pension insurance benefits (administered by "approved societies" including friendly societies and some trade unions) and the other for unemployment benefit which was administered directly by government.

=== Beveridge and post-war expansion ===
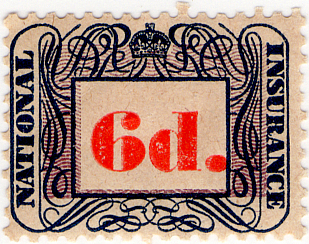
A British 1948 National Insurance stamp, once used to collect contributions to the scheme

The Beveridge Report in 1942 proposed expansion and unification of the welfare state under a scheme of what was called social insurance. In March 1943 Winston Churchill in a broadcast entitled "After the War" committed the government to a system of "national compulsory insurance for all classes for all purposes from the cradle to the grave".

Following the Second World War, the Attlee government pressed ahead with the introduction of the Welfare State, of which an expanded National Insurance scheme was a major component. As part of this process, in 1948, a single stamp was introduced which covered all the benefits of the new Welfare State. At that point, responsibility passed to the new Ministry of National Insurance; many of the former approved societies went into liquidation as a result.

=== 1975 onwards ===
Stamp cards for class 1 (employed) contributions persisted until 1975 when these contributions finally ceased to be flat-rate and became earnings related, collected along with Income Tax under the PAYE procedures. Making NI contributions is still often described by people as paying their stamp.

As the system developed, the link between individual contributions and benefits was weakened.

== Contributions ==
The contributions component of the system, "National Insurance Contributions" (NICs) are paid by employees and employers on earnings, and by employers on certain benefits-in-kind provided to employees. The self-employed contribute through a percentage of net profits above a threshold. Individuals may also make voluntary contributions, in order to fill a gap in their contributions record and thus protect their entitlement to benefits. Contributions are collected by HM Revenue and Customs (HMRC) through the PAYE system, along with Income Tax and repayments of Student Loans and Postgraduate Loans.

People in certain circumstances, such as caring for a child, caring for a severely disabled person for more than 20 hours a week or claiming unemployment or sickness benefits, can gain National Insurance credits which protects their rights to various benefits.

National Insurance is a significant contributor to UK government revenues, with contributions estimated to comprise 18% of total revenue in the 2019/2020 financial year.

=== Contribution classes ===
National insurance contributions (NICs) fall into a number of classes. Class 1, 2 and 3 NICs paid are credited to an individual's NI account, which determines eligibility for certain benefits - including the state pension. Class 1A, 1B and 4 NIC do not count towards benefit entitlements but must still be paid if due.

==== Class 1 ====
Class 1 contributions are paid by employers and their employees. In law, the employee contribution is referred to as the 'primary' contribution and the employer contribution as the 'secondary', but they are usually referred to simply as employee and employer contributions.

The employee contribution is deducted from gross wages by the employer, with no action required by the employee. The employer then adds in their own contribution and remits the total to HMRC along with income tax and other statutory deductions. Contributions for employees are calculated on a periodic basis, usually weekly or monthly depending on how the employee is paid, with no reference to earnings in previous periods. Those for company directors are calculated on an annual basis, to ensure that the correct level of NICs are collected regardless of how often the director chooses to be paid.

There are a number of milestone figures which determine the rate of NICs to be paid. These are the Lower Earnings Limit (LEL), Primary Threshold (PT), Secondary Threshold (ST) and Upper Earnings Limit (UEL). Since April 2025 the Secondary Threshold has been set well below the Primary Threshold, so employers begin paying contributions at a lower level of earnings than employees. The cash value of most of these figures normally changes each year, either in line with inflation or by some other amount decided by the Chancellor, although the Primary Threshold, Secondary Threshold and Upper Earnings Limit have been frozen in recent years. The PT is normally indexed to inflation using the CPI, while other thresholds remain indexed using the RPI.

- On earnings below the LEL, no NICs are paid and no benefit entitlement accrues.
- On earnings above the LEL, up to and including the PT, employee contributions are not paid but are credited by the government as if they were (enabling certain low-paid workers to qualify for benefits).
- On earnings up to and including the ST, employer contributions are not paid.
- On earnings above the PT (for employees) or ST (for employers), up to and including the UEL, NICs are collected at a rate which is determined by a number of factors:
  - Whether the employee has reached the age at which State Pension becomes payable
  - Whether the employee is a married woman paying reduced-rate contributions. This facility was abolished on 11 May 1977 but women who were already paying these contributions at that time were allowed to opt to continue to do so for as long as they remained married (or widowed) and in employment
  - Whether the employee is an ocean-going mariner or deep-sea fisherman.
  - In the case of the employer contribution, whether the employee is aged under 21, is an apprentice aged under 25, is an armed forces veteran in their first year of civilian employment, or works at a freeport or investment zone.
- On earnings above the UEL yet another set of rates apply, this time depending only on whether the employee has reached the age at which State Pension becomes payable or is an ocean-going mariner or deep-sea fisherman

===== Table letters =====
As indicated above, the rates at which an individual and their employer pay contributions depend on a number of factors. Consequently, there are many possible sets of employer/employee contribution rates to allow for all combinations of the various factors. HMRC allocate a letter of the alphabet, referred to as an 'NI Table Letter', to each of these sets of contribution rates. Employers are responsible for allocating the correct table letter to each employee depending on their particular circumstances.

Each tax year, HMRC publish look-up tables for each table letter to assist with manual calculation of contributions, though these days most of the calculations are done by computer systems and the tables are available only as downloads. In addition, HMRC provide an online National Insurance Calculator.

===== Class 1A =====
Class 1A contributions were introduced from 6 April 1991, and are paid by employers on the value of company cars and certain other benefits in kind provided to their employees and directors, at the standard employer contribution percentage rate for the tax year. Class 1A contributions do not provide any benefit entitlement for individuals.

===== Class 1B =====
Class 1B contributions were introduced on 6 April 1999 and are payable by employers as part of a PAYE Settlement Agreement (an arrangement whereby the employer meets the tax liabilities on certain benefits). Class 1B contributions are paid at the same rate as Class 1A contributions and do not provide any benefit entitlement for individuals.

===== Contribution rates =====
Contribution rates are set for each tax year by the government.

The general rates for the tax year 2026/27, between 6 April 2026 and 5 April 2027, are shown below. For those who qualify for the mariners rates, the employee rates are as shown below and the non-zero employer rates are 0.5% lower than those shown below.

Employees (2026/27)
Weekly earnings	Standard	Reduced (married women's election)	Over State Pension age
Up to £129 a week	n/a	n/a	n/a
£129.01 to £242 a week	0%	0%	0%
£242.01 to £967 a week	8%	1.85%	0%
Over £967 a week	2%	2%	0%

Employers (2026/27)
Weekly earnings	Standard	Under 21, apprentice under 25 or veteran	Freeport or investment zone employee
Up to £96 a week	0%	0%	0%
£96.01 to £481 a week	15%	0%	0%
£481.01 to £967 a week	15%	0%	15%
Over £967 a week	15%	15%	15%
Class 1A & 1B	15%		

The employer rate was increased from 13.8% to 15% and the Secondary Threshold was reduced from £9,100 to £5,000 a year from 6 April 2025. At the same time the Employment Allowance, which reduces the employer contributions payable by eligible employers, was increased to £10,500 a year.

==== Class 2 ====
Class 2 contributions are flat-rate weekly contributions made by self-employed people. Until 5 April 2024 they were compulsory for self-employed people with profits at or above the Small Profits Threshold. From 6 April 2024 compulsory Class 2 contributions were abolished. Self-employed people with profits at or above the Small Profits Threshold (£7,105 for 2026/27) are now treated as having paid Class 2 contributions, so the year counts towards their contribution record without any payment. Those with profits below the threshold may pay Class 2 contributions voluntarily, at £3.65 a week for 2026/27, to protect their record.

From 6 April 2026, voluntary Class 2 contributions can no longer be paid for periods spent living or working outside the UK. The only exceptions are self-employed people treated as self-employed in the UK under a social security agreement, and volunteer development workers paying the special rate.

For the most part, unlike Class 1, Class 2 contributions do not form part of a qualifying contribution record for contributions-based Jobseekers Allowance, but do count towards Employment and Support Allowance.

==== Class 3 ====
Class 3 contributions are voluntary NICs paid by people wishing to fill a gap in their contributions record which has arisen either by not working or by their earnings being too low. The rate for 2026/27 is £18.40 a week. Gaps can normally be filled for the previous six tax years. A temporary extension allowed gaps from April 2006 onwards to be filled until 5 April 2025.

Class 3 contributions only count towards State Pension and Bereavement Benefit entitlement. The main reason for paying Class 3 NICs is to ensure that a person's contribution record is preserved to provide entitlement to these benefits, though care needs to be taken not to pay unnecessarily as it is not necessary to have contributions in every year of a working life in order to qualify.

Since the removal of voluntary Class 2 for periods abroad in April 2026, Class 3 is the only voluntary route for most people living outside the UK. New applicants paying for periods abroad from 2026/27 onwards must have lived in the UK for at least 10 continuous years, or have at least 10 qualifying years on their record, replacing the previous three-year requirement.

==== Class 4 ====
Class 4 contributions are paid by self-employed people as a portion of their profits. The amount due is calculated with income tax at the end of the year, based on figures supplied on the SA100 tax return.

Contributions are based around two thresholds, the Lower Profits Limit (LPL) and the Upper Profits Limit (UPL). These have the same cash values as the Primary Threshold and Upper Earnings Limit used in Class 1 calculations (£12,570 and £50,270 for 2026/27).

- No class 4 NICs are due on profits up to and including the LPL.
- Above the LPL, up to and including the UPL, class 4 NICs are paid at 6%. The rate was 9% for many years until it was reduced to 6% from 6 April 2024.
- Above the UPL, class 4 NICs are paid at 2%.

Class 4 contributions do not form part of a qualifying contribution record for any benefits, including the State Pension. Self-employed people build entitlement through Class 2, either paid voluntarily or, since April 2024, treated as paid when profits reach the Small Profits Threshold.

==== NI credits ====
People who are unable to work for some reason may be able to claim NI credits (technically credited earnings, since 1987). These are equivalent to Class 1 NICs, though are not paid for. They are granted either to maintain a contributions record while not working, or to those applying for benefits whose contribution record is only slightly short of the requirements for those benefits. In the latter case, they cannot be used to fill "gaps" in past years in contribution records for some benefits.

== Benefits ==
The benefit component comprises a number of contributory benefits of availability and amount determined by the claimant's contribution record and circumstances. Weekly income benefits and some lump-sum benefits to participants upon death, retirement, unemployment, maternity and disability are provided.

=== Current benefits ===
Benefits for which there is a contribution condition:

- Bereavement benefit
- Employment and Support Allowance (new-style)
- Jobseeker's Allowance (new-style)
- Statutory Sick Pay
- State Pension

=== Former benefits ===
Historic benefits for which there was a contribution condition:

- Incapacity Benefit
- Invalidity Benefit
- State Earnings-Related Pension Scheme
- Unemployment Benefit
- Widowed Mother’s Allowance
- Widowed Parent's Allowance
- Widow’s Pension

== Administration ==
=== National Insurance Fund ===
The National Insurance Funds are used to pay for certain types of welfare expenditure and National Insurance payments cannot be used directly to fund general government spending. However, any surplus in the funds is invested in government securities, and so is effectively lent to the government at low rates of interest. National Insurance contributions are paid into the various National Insurance Funds after deduction of monies specifically allocated to the National Health Services (NHS). However a small percentage is transferred from the funds to the NHS from certain of the smaller sub-classes. Thus the four NHS organisations are partially funded from NI contributions but not from the NI Fund. Less than half of benefit expenditure (42.1%) now goes on contributory benefits, compared with over 65% in 1978–79 because of the growth of means-tested benefits since the late 1970s.

An actuarial evaluation of the long-term prospects for the National Insurance system is mandated every 5 years, or whenever any changes are proposed to benefits or contributions. Such evaluations are conducted by the Government Actuary's Department and the resulting reports must be presented to the UK Parliament. The most recent review was conducted as at April 2020, with the report being published two years later.

=== National Insurance number ===
To administer the National Insurance system, a National Insurance number is issued automatically to most young people shortly before their 16th birthday, where Child Benefit has been claimed for them. People coming from overseas have to apply for a NI number before they can qualify for benefits; although holding a NI number is not a prerequisite for working in the UK, a tax code cannot be operated without one. An NI number is in the format: two letters, six digits and one further letter or a space. The example used is typically QQ123456C. It is usual to pair off the digits - such separators are seen on forms used by government departments (both internal and external, notably the P45 and P60).

=== National Insurance and PAYE Service ===
National Insurance contributions for all UK residents and some non-residents are recorded using the NPS computer system (National Insurance and PAYE Service). This came into use in June and July 2009 and brought NIC and Income Tax records together on one system for the first time.

The original National Insurance Recording System (NIRS) was a more archaic system first used in 1975 without direct user access to its records. A civil servant working within the Contributions Office (NICO) would have to request paper printouts of an individual's account which could take up to two weeks to arrive. New information to be added to the account would be sent to specialised data entry operatives on paper to be input into NIRS.

NIRS/2, introduced in 1996, was a large and complex computer system which had several uses. These included individual applications to access or update an individual National Insurance account, to view employer's National Insurance schemes and a general work management application. There was some controversy regarding the NIRS/2 system from its inception when problems with the new system attracted widespread media coverage.

Due to these computer problems, Deficiency Notices (telling individuals of a possible shortfall in their contributions), which had been sent out on an annual basis prior to 1996, stopped being issued; the Inland Revenue took several years to clear the backlog. As a result, many people were unaware whether they had incomplete years of contributions towards their State Pension (including women affected by the rise in State Pension age).

== Contribution rates – employees ==
As noted above, the employee contribution was a flat rate stamp until 1975. After this, the rates have been as follows:

Year	Lower band	Upper band	Above upper band
1975–1976	N/A	5.5%	N/A
1976–1978	N/A	5.75%	N/A
1978–1979	N/A	6.5%	N/A
1979–1980	N/A	6.75%	N/A
1980–1981	N/A	7.75%	N/A
1981–1982	N/A	8.75%	N/A
1982–1989	N/A	9%	N/A
1989–1994	2%	9%	N/A
1994–1999	2%	10%	N/A
1999–2003	0%	10%	N/A
2003–2011	0%	11%	1%
2011–2022	0%	12%	2%
2022–2023	0%	12% (Note: Set at 13.25% from 6 April to 5 November 2022)	2% (Note: Set at 3.25% from 6 April to 5 November 2022)
2023–2024	0%	12% (Note: Set at 10% from 6 January to 5 April 2024)	2%
2024–present	0%	8%	2%

On 7 September 2021, the government announced an increase of NI rates by 1.25 percentage points for the 2022–23 tax year, breaking its 2019 manifesto promise. From 2023, a new health and social care levy charged at the 1.25% rate would be introduced with NI rates reverting to their previous rates. This move was reversed by new chancellor Kwasi Kwarteng effective 6 November 2022.

In the early 2000s the lower threshold for employee contributions was aligned with the standard personal allowance for Income Tax but later diverged significantly, as illustrated in the following table, before being realigned in July 2022.

For 2015–16 there was therefore up to £304.80 payable by someone who has not reached the point where they are liable for Income Tax. This rose to £352.80 for 2016–17, to £400.32 for 2017–18, to £411.12 for 2018-19 and to £464.16 for 2019–20. This fell to £360 for 2020–21. Since 6 July 2022 no employee NI has been payable on earnings below the Income Tax personal allowance.

Year	NI employee threshold	Income Tax allowance	Charge to NI only
2007-8	£5,205	£5,225	£20
2008-9	£5,465	£6,435	£970
2009-10	£5,725	£6,475	£750
2010-11	£5,725	£6,475	£750
2011-12	£7,235	£7,475	£240
2012-13	£7,599	£8,105	£505
2013-14	£7,755	£9,440	£1,685
2014-15	£7,956	£10,000	£2,036
2015-16	£8,060	£10,600	£2,540
2016-17	£8,060	£11,000	£2,940
2017-18	£8,164	£11,500	£3,336
2018-19	£8,424	£11,850	£3,426
2019-20	£8,632	£12,500	£3,868
2020-21	£9,500	£12,500	£3,000
2021-22	£9,568	£12,570	£3,002
2022-23	£9,880 (Note: Until 5 July 2022) £12,570	£12,570	£2,690 £0
2023-24 onwards	£12,570	£12,570	£0

The upper limit is currently set at the figure at which the higher rate of Income Tax becomes chargeable for a person on the standard personal allowance for Income Tax in all parts of the UK except Scotland (which can set its own level for the tax threshold, but not for the NI upper limit).

The 2019-24 government's manifesto in the 2019 general election promised to restore the parity between the NI and Income Tax thresholds by the end of their first term in office. The limits were harmonised on 6 July 2022.

The limits and rates for the following tax year are normally announced at the same time as the autumn budget made by the Chancellor of the Exchequer. Current rates are published on GOV.UK.

The calculation of contributions for employees has to be made on each pay period (for non-directors of a company). As a result and unlike Income Tax, a weekly paid employee will face a charge in any week where earnings exceed 1/52 of the annual limit. It is therefore possible for a charge to arise on someone who earns below the limit on an annual basis but who has occasional payments above the weekly limit.

A further complication is that an employee has an allowance per employer, unlike income tax where the allowance is split between employers via the person's tax code. So a person with two low paid jobs would pay less, possibly nothing, than someone who earned the same amount from one job. In addition, no deductions are allowable unlike with Income Tax. This means that NI becomes payable on a greater share of income (immediately after the threshold).

== See also ==
- H.M. Stationery Office Collection, a collection of British national insurance stamps in the British Library Philatelic Collections
- National Insurance Fund
- Beveridge Report
- Welfare spending
