= Liberty Accounts =

Online accounting and payroll software system

Athene Systems Limited
- Type: Private Limited
- Industry: Computer software
- Founded: United Kingdom (1996)
- Headquarters: Farnborough, Hampshire, United Kingdom
- Key people: Alan Wright (MD), Paul Taylor (Director), Neil Chadwick (Director)
- Website: www.libertyaccounts.com

Liberty Accounts is an integrated online accounting and payroll system designed specifically for small and medium enterprises, not-for-profit organisation and charities in the UK. Also described as a software as a service or SaaS cloud computing application, Liberty is available to business owners, treasurers and accountants.

== History ==
A second-generation online accounting system, Liberty was developed by Athene Systems Limited, along with Neil Chadwick — former Marketing Director of Easycounting.

Athene Systems Limited was founded in 1996 by Alan Wright and Paul Taylor, who realized the potential of the internet as a means of collaboration between accountants and their clients. Development work on Liberty Accounts started in 2001, with the initial launch in 2003. Neil Chadwick joined Wright and Taylor in 2006.

Since 2004/05 the system has linked directly to the HM Revenue and Customs (HMRC) portal for online filing of PAYE and P11D, as well as facilitating IR35 income and expense association with contracts and employees.

In 2009, Liberty Accounts was accredited by the Institute of Chartered Accountants in England and Wales (ICAEW).

== Technical details ==
The Liberty Accounts system uses industry-standard Oracle and Java (programming language) technologies. It delivers HTML in a cross-platform web browser environment, hosted in the UK in a secure data centre.

=== Management tools ===
Liberty Accounts offers different levels of functionality, depending on the skills and training of the user – meaning that both accountants and their clients can work on the same records, at their own level. This allows for closer and more ongoing collaboration between accountants and client businesses. According to accountant Ray Backler, "I work with my clients on a day-to-day basis using the online system and the current financial position of the business is always up-to-date, so it is obvious when additional work is required, and it's easy to make recommendations for additional revenue streams."

Accountants can set up a separate area within Liberty Accounts where they can access cross-client views and a range of reports, as well as highlight key tasks and event dates. "Global account settings can be enforced (for P11D classification, NIC classification, default VAT rates, and nominal codes for export to statutory accounts packages) from this control area, and the system can be tailored with the help of pre-packaged ‘roles’. These help members of the firm to manage their work efficiently, and make it easy for firms to control (and restrict) the menu options and structure available to clients."

=== Data and functionality ===
Secure transmission of data for online transactions is via a Thawte SSL web server certificate. The visual treatment is similar to that found in the Windows environment, featuring a typical management snapshot, lists of outstanding sales and purchase invoices and the current bank balance. "The Windows-style drop-down menus mirror desktop accounting packages...Reports are generated as PDFs almost instantly and displayed automatically. The presentation of reports and the range of report options look very much like QuickBooks, so there's instant familiarity for most accountants." Transactions — such as invoices, bank entries or journals — can be posted singly or in batches. "Liberty supports the use of foreign currencies for invoices and customer statements (and can automatically calculate and post exchange rate gains and losses) and as well as having built-in stock control and payroll, it is unusual in offering the tools required for P11D compliance (including section 336 claims)...It captures P11D-related information at a transaction level, pulls the figures together on screen and then produces an HMRC approved facsimile of the P11D form, for ‘one click’ electronic filing."

=== Value Added Tax ===
Liberty was the first online accounting provider to offer VAT functionality, including transactions such as European Union acquisitions, and production of the European Community Sales List (form VAT 101). Standard and cash accounting VAT schemes are supported, as well as flat-rate VAT (calculated on a transaction basis). According to David Harbron at the Fenchurch Group of commercial and residential property development companies: "When the UK VAT rate rose to 20% in the New Year, [I] knew that Liberty would immediately be updated to reflect the increase, and that the automatic invoices the Fenchurch Group had set up for its tenants would all go out with the correct VAT rate on."
