= Self-assessment (disambiguation) =

Self-assessment is a topic in social psychology.

Self assessment may also refer to:

- A form of educational assessment in which students make judgements about their own work
- A process in which an organization reviews its activities and results against the EFQM Excellence Model
- A system of collecting income tax in the United Kingdom
