= Torosyan v. Boehringer Ingelheim Pharmaceuticals, Inc. =

- Court: Connecticut Supreme Court
- Decided: July 4, 1995
- Citation: 662 A2d 89 (1995)

Keywords
- Contracts, just cause

Torosyan v. Boehringer Ingelheim Pharmaceuticals, Inc., 662 A2d 89 (1995) is a US labor law case, concerning the contract of employment in state law for labor rights. It represents the approach in Connecticut.

== Facts ==
Anushavan Torosyan claimed that he was unjustly terminated, because he was promised in an old staff handbook that he could be dismissed for good cause only. This was left out of the new handbook, but Torosyan had not agreed to any change.

== Judgment ==
The Supreme Court of Connecticut held the original promise was one an employee could rely upon. An employer could not unilaterally convert an employee’s status to an at-will relation simply by issuing a second handbook. It would be improper to infer the employee consented to the new terms, simply because he or she wanted to continue work. The only alternative was to resign, giving up the job security the employer originally promised.
