= P11D =

UK tax form

Form P11D (Expenses and Benefits) is a tax form filed by United Kingdom employers for each director and for each employee and sent to the tax office with which their PAYE scheme is registered. P11Ds are used to report benefits provided and expense payments made to employees by employers that are not put through the payroll. The employees are also given a copy, should they need it for a self-assessment tax return.

This is not to be confused with form P11 (Deductions Working Sheet), which is for tracking deductions made by PAYE.

A similar form P9D (Expenses payments and income from which tax cannot be deducted) used to exist for employees earning less than £8500 per year, but that was abolished in April 2016.

== Content ==
There are currently 14 sections of the P11D:

- A: Assets Transferred
- B: Payments made on behalf of the employee
- C: Credit Cards and vouchers
- D: Living Accommodation
- E: Mileage Allowances
- F: Cars and car fuel
- G: Company Vans
- H: Beneficial Loans
- I: Medical Health
- J: Qualifying relocation expenses payments and benefits
- K: Services supplied
- L: Assets placed at the employee's disposal
- M: Other items (including subscriptions and professional fees)
- N: Expenses payments made to, or on behalf of, the employee

To calculate the amount that an employee will have to pay tax on, the employer has to calculate a cash equivalent of the provided benefit/expense. Most cash equivalents are straight forward being the amount the employer pays for the provision of a service less any amount the employee reimburses to their employer. However, there are some quite complicated areas of UK benefits legislation that have to be interpreted to arrive at a cash equivalent e.g. Company cars, Beneficial loans etc.

== Filing requirements ==
Employers' obligations are to calculate these cash equivalents and report these details to employees and HMRC by 6 July following the end of a tax year (ending 5 April). It is estimated that 5 million P11Ds are submitted to HMRC annually. The most popular method of submission remains hard copies however there is a significant growing proportion that submit via the File by Internet route using XML.

There is the potential for substantial penalties to be imposed if P11D returns are not completed or are incorrectly returned. Therefore, most larger employers tend to utilise software to improve the accuracy of their data.

As of June 2026, real-time payroll reporting is set to offer an alternative to completion of a P11D form, although the process still remains available.

== See also ==
- Taxation in the United Kingdom
- UK labour law
