= Dismissal (employment) =

Involuntary termination of employment

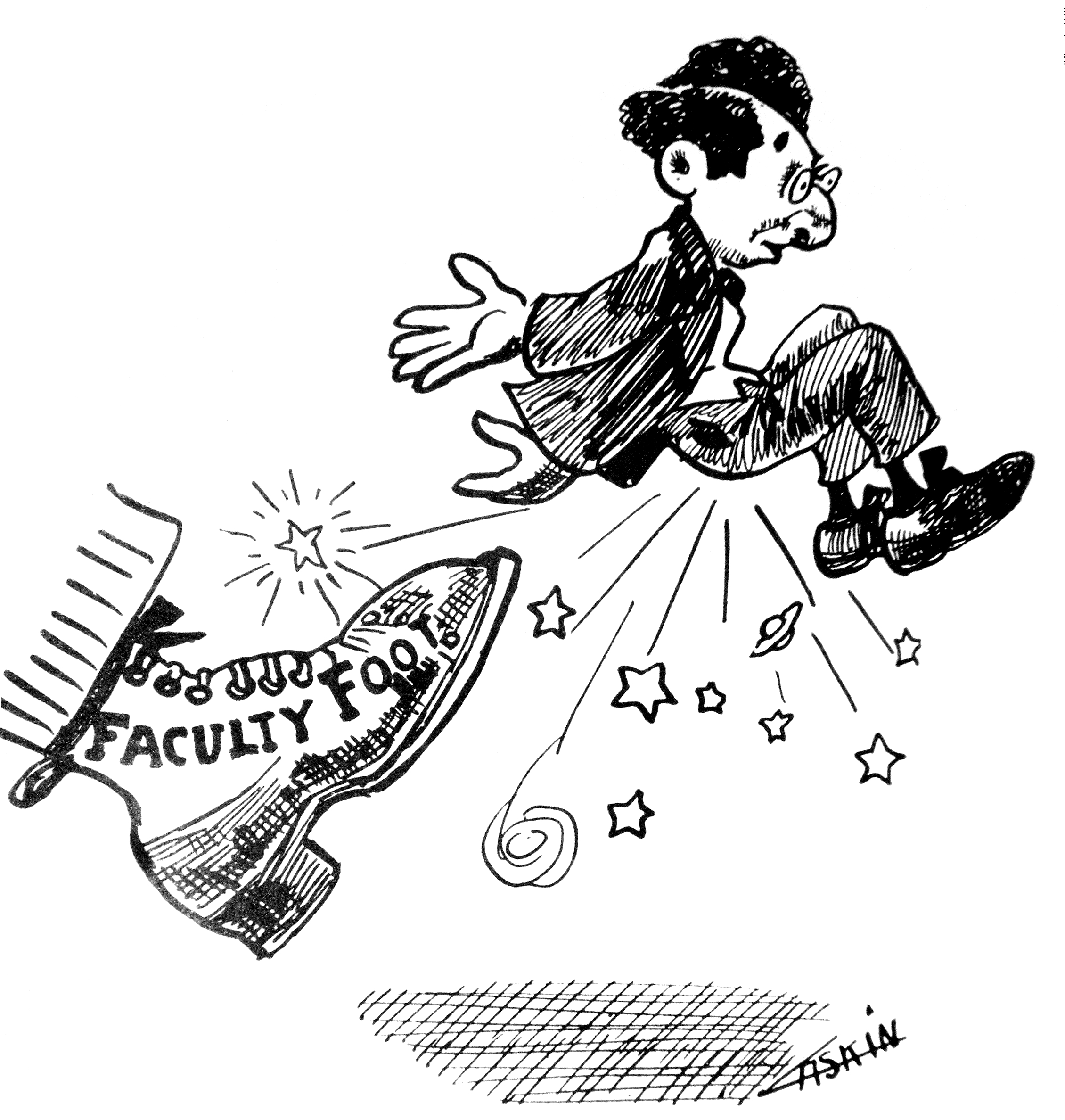
An early 20th-century illustration of a university faculty member being "given the boot", slang for a form of involuntary termination.

Dismissal (colloquially called firing, booting, or sacking) is the termination of employment by an employer against the will of the employee. Though such a decision can be made by an employer for a variety of reasons, ranging from an economic downturn to performance-related problems on the part of the employee, being fired carries stigma in some cultures.

Unlike resignation or being laid off, dismissal is often the fault of the employee. Finding new employment after dismissal can be difficult, particularly if the dismissal was due to serious misconduct or if the employee held the position for a short time. Applicants often omit dismissed positions from their resumes, creating unexplained gaps that hiring managers may interpret as a red flag.

== Usage ==
While the main formal term for ending someone's employment is "dismissal", there are a number of colloquial or euphemistic expressions for the same action.

"Firing" is a common colloquial term in the English language (particularly used in the U.S. and Canada), which may have originated in the 1910s at the National Cash Register Company. Other terms for dismissal are being "canned", "let go", "ran-off", "axed", being given walking papers, the pink slip or one's cards, (or P45 in the UK), "boned", or "shown the door". Other terms, more often used in Commonwealth countries, include "to get the boot", "to get the sack", or simply to be "sacked".

== Reasons ==
Most US states have adopted the at-will employment contract that allows the employer to dismiss employees without having to provide a justified reason for firing, although the variety of court cases that have come out of "at-will" dismissals have made such at-will contracts ambiguous. Often, an at-will termination is handled as a "layoff". Sometimes, an employee will be dismissed if an employer can find better employees than the incumbent, even if the fired employee has not technically broken any rules. This is common with probationary employees who were recently hired, but who cannot adjust to the environment of the workplace, or those who have been around for a long time, but can be replaced with a less experienced employee who can be paid a lower salary. In contrast, a dismissal in France is subjected to a just cause and a formal procedure.

Some examples include conflict of interest, where the employee has done nothing wrong, but the presence of the employee on the employer's payroll may be harmful to the employer. For example:

- A close relative (spouse, sibling, child or parent) of a member of the executive management of a company might not be able to work for a competitor where they could know trade secrets or where they themselves are part of the other company's executive management due to requirements for competition or antitrust prohibitions.
- This may be the case when two members of the same family become employed by the firm.
- In other cases, those who report wrongdoing in the workplace, known as whistleblowers, put their job at risk because they might be retaliated against.

More common reasons for firing include attendance problems, insubordination (talking back to a manager or supervisor), drinking alcoholic beverages or doing illegal drugs at work, or consuming the same substances before work and showing up to work while intoxicated or "high" (an especially serious problem in jobs where the worker drives a vehicle, boat or aircraft or operates heavy machinery) or off job-site conduct.

On occasion, employers may choose to "layoff" employees due to business concerns. This can include financial difficulties, restructuring, or cost-saving measures rather than poor performance. In the US, any mass layoff that displaces enough workers requires a 60-day notice prior to its effect according to the WARN Act. In the EU, any layoff that qualifies as a "collective redundancy" requires consultations with staff representatives and notification to public authorities.

== Additional consequences ==
Some fired employees may face additional consequences besides their dismissal. This may occur when the reason for the termination is a violation of criminal law, or if serious damages are caused to the employer as a result of the employee's actions. Such ex-employees may face criminal prosecution, a civil lawsuit, or a reporting to a database of those who have engaged in serious misconduct in such a position, so that the chances of ever obtaining a similar position with another employer are less likely (blacklisting). Some examples are a caregiver who engages in abuse, a bank teller who has stolen money from the cash drawer, or a member of law enforcement who has committed police brutality.

For the most serious violations, especially when the employer's security may be at risk from the employee in question, a guard or officer may escort a fired employee from the workplace to the parking lot upon their dismissal. Such actions are often taken by government offices or large corporations that contain sensitive materials, and where the risk exists that the terminated employee may remove some of these materials or otherwise steal trade secrets in order to retaliate against the employer or use it to the advantage of a competing enterprise.

== Discriminatory and retaliatory termination ==
In some cases, the firing of an employee is a discriminatory act. Although an employer may often claim the dismissal was for "just cause", these discriminatory acts are often because of the employee's legally protected characteristics, which vary from place to place. They may include physical or mental disability, age, race, religion, gender, HIV status or sexual orientation. Other unjust firings may result from a workplace manager or supervisor wanting to retaliate against an employee. Often, this is because the worker reported wrongdoing (often, but not always sexual harassment or other misconduct) on the part of the supervisor. Such terminations are often illegal. Many successful lawsuits have resulted from discriminatory or retaliatory termination.

Under US law, workers are entitled to workplace decisions that do not discriminate against their membership in a protected group such as national origin, but they are not entitled to overall fairness. It is legal for an American employee to be fired for things such as disagreeing with the employer or not getting along well with others, even if the employee is correct.

Under EU law, discriminatory dismissal on the grounds of sex, ethnicity, religion, age, disability and sexuality are illegal. Further protections also apply to employees who are pregnant or on parental leave. When discrimination is alleged, the burden of proof is on the employer to show a just cause of dismissal; on grounds of a disability, an employer has to prove all reasonable accommodations have been sought. Retaliation because of an employee's complaint or legal action against the employer is also illegal.

Discriminatory or retaliatory termination by a supervisor can take the form of administrative process. In this form the rules of the institution are used as the basis for termination. For example, if a place of employment has a rule that prohibits personal phone calls, receiving or making personal calls can be the grounds for termination even though it may be a common practice within the organization.

== Changes of conditions ==
Employers who wish for an employee to exit of their own accord, but do not wish to pursue firing or forced resignation, may degrade the employee's working conditions, hoping that he or she will leave "voluntarily". The employee may be moved to a different geographical location, assigned to an undesirable shift, given too few hours if part-time, demoted (or relegated to a menial task), or assigned to work in uncomfortable conditions. Other forms of manipulation may be used, such as being unfairly hostile to the employee, and punishing them for things that are deliberately overlooked with other employees. Such tactics may amount to constructive dismissal, which is illegal in some jurisdictions.

== Rehire following termination ==
Depending on the circumstances, a person whose employment has been terminated may not be eligible to be rehired by the same employer. If the decision to terminate was the employee's, the willingness of the employer to rehire is often contingent upon the relationship the employee had with the employer, the amount of notice given by the employee prior to departure, and the needs of the employer. In some cases, when an employee departed on good terms, they may be given special priority by the employer when seeking rehire.

In the United States, an employee may be terminated without prejudice, meaning the fired employee may be rehired for the same job in the future. This is usually true in the case of layoff. Conversely, a person can be terminated with prejudice, meaning an employer will not rehire the former employee for the same job in the future. This can be for many reasons: incompetence, misconduct (such as dishonesty or "zero tolerance" violations), policy violation, insubordination or "attitude" (personality clashes with peers or bosses). Termination forms ("pink slips" in the U.S. and Canada) routinely include a set of check boxes where a supervisor can indicate "with prejudice" or "without prejudice". During the Vietnam War, the CIA used this terminology with regard to its locally hired operatives. In the case of severe misconduct, it is alleged that the CIA would assassinate them or "terminate with extreme prejudice".

== See also ==
- Employee exit management
- Job security
- Labour market flexibility
- Termination of employment in Argentina
- Turnover
- Dropping out
