= Honest Burgers =

UK burger restaurant chain

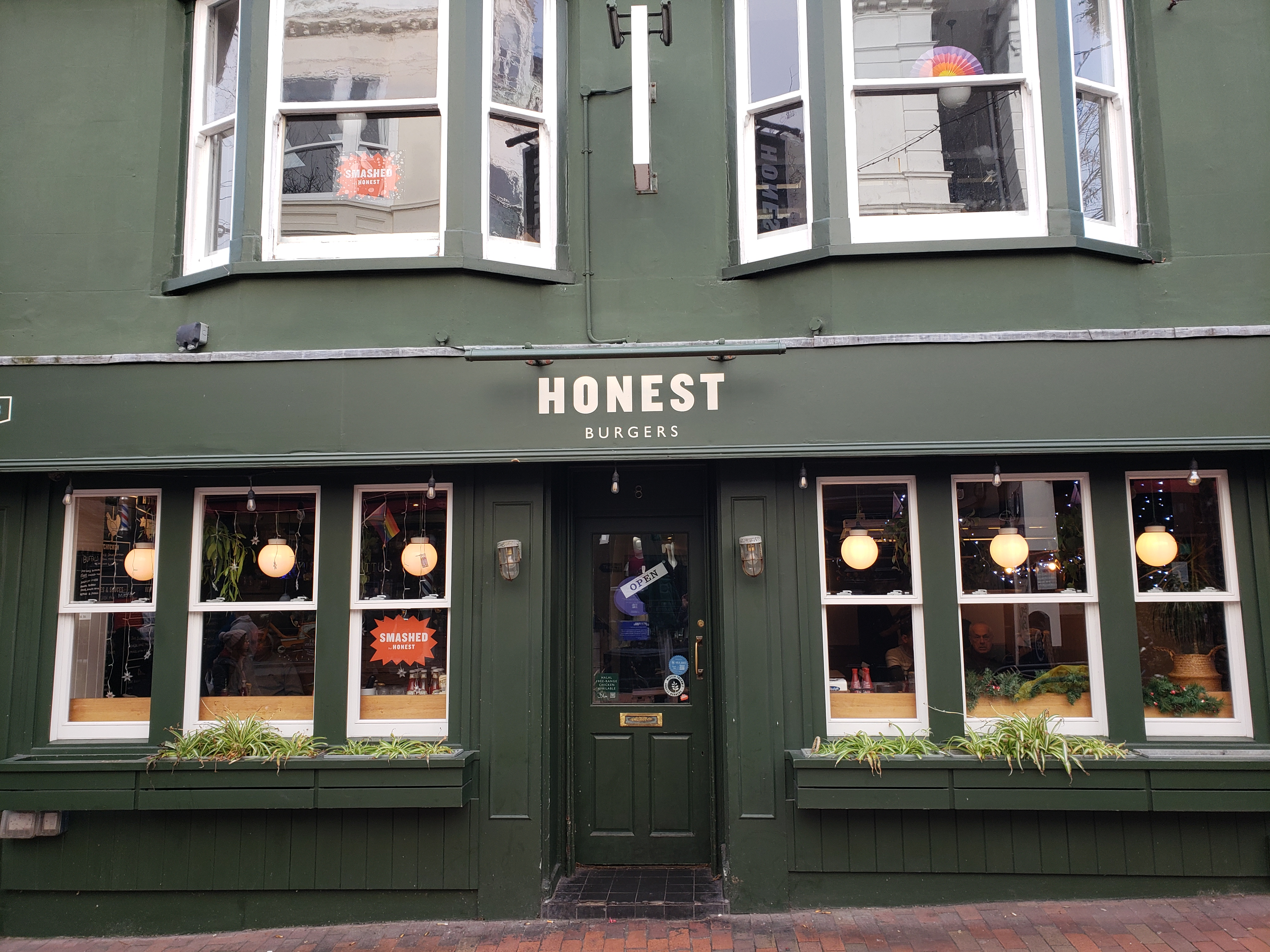
Honest Burgers, Brighton in 2022

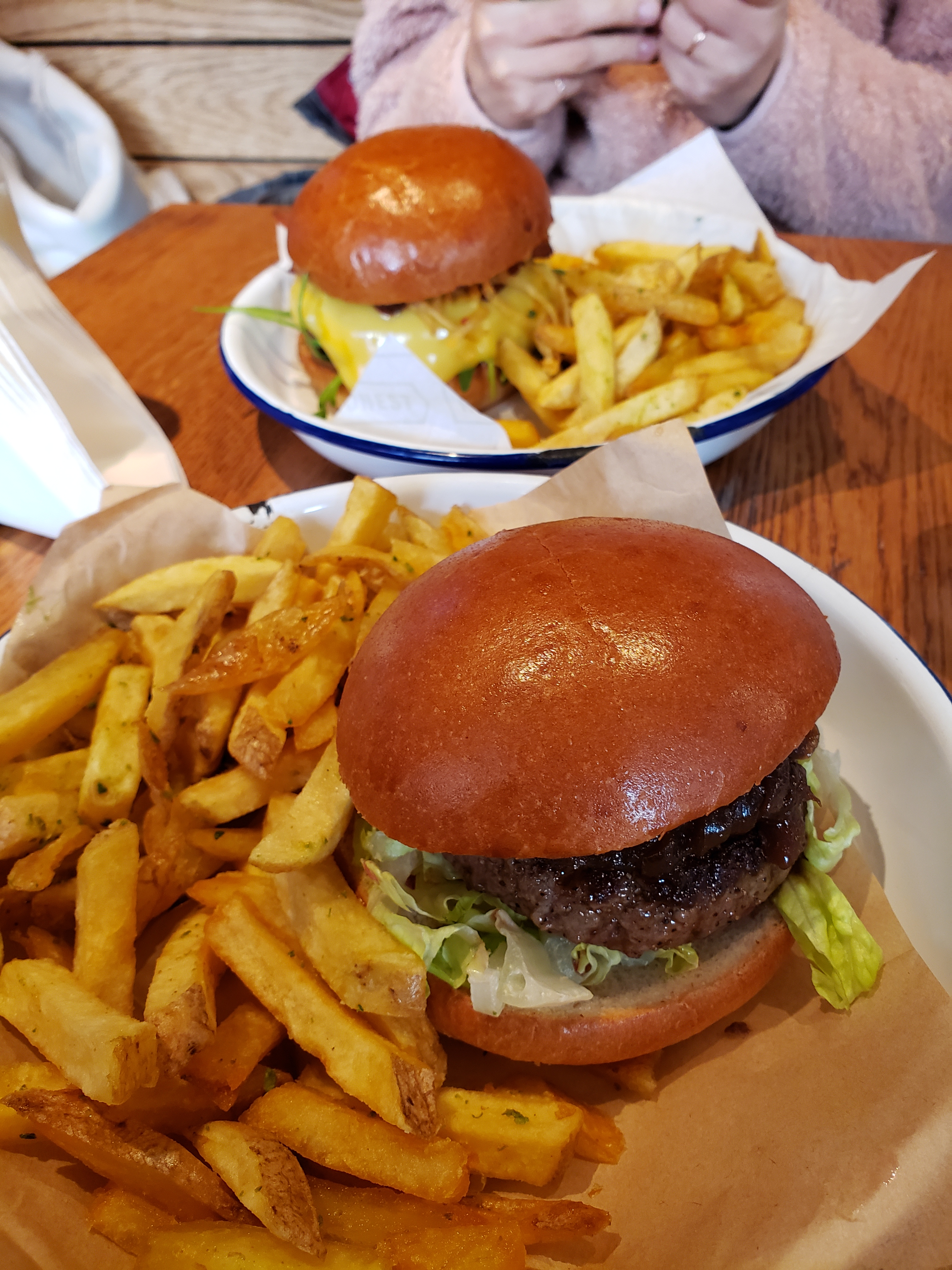
Beef Burger and Vegan Xmas Burger, 2022

Honest Burgers is a British casual dining chain, mainly in London, but with branches as far away as Cardiff, Liverpool and Manchester. As of June 2024, they have 39 restaurants.

The company was founded in 2009 by Tom Barton and Phillip Eeles.

In February 2023, the company threatened to fire and rehire staff if they did not accept the loss of paid breaks.

In December 2023, the company was in a legal dispute with HMRC after a request for an extension on a tax bill was ignored. Subsequently, the company was handed a winding up petition, which was withdrawn after the company paid its tax bill.
