= Robertson v British Gas Corp =

- Court: Court of Appeal of England and Wales
- Citation: [1983] ICR 351

Keywords
- Employment contract

Robertson v British Gas Corp [1983] ICR 351 is a UK labour law case concerning the contract of employment. It held that by withdrawing a bonus that was fixed by collective agreement, an employer had broken individual employment contracts. The bonus provisions were apt for incorporation into individual contracts and thus required the employees' consent to be withdrawn.

== Facts ==
A bonus scheme for British Gas employees was fixed by collective agreement. The employer said it was terminating bonuses and withdrawing from the collective agreement. Employees claimed for arrears in the lost bonus entitlements.

== Judgment ==
Kerr LJ upheld the claim for three reasons. First, the bonus scheme was part of the individual contracts of employment because it was an important part of wages. Second, if the collective agreement was varied it had no effect on individual contracts. ‘This was another way of saying that the terms of the individual contracts are in part to be found in the agreed collective agreements as exist from time to time…’ Third, the approach to treating an employer’s statement as merely evidence of the contract’s terms, seen in System Floors (U.K.) Ltd v Daniel was approved.

== See also ==
- UK labour law
- Employment contract in English law
- Autoclenz Ltd v Belcher [2011] UKSC 41
