= Group Certificate =

Group Certificate may refer to:

- Group Certificate (Ireland) a school examination offered from 1947 to 1991
- Group Certificate (Australia) a certificate of pay-as-you-go tax
