= Tax code (PAYE) =

In the UK, every person paid under the PAYE scheme is allocated a tax code by HM Revenue and Customs. This is usually in the form of a number followed by a letter suffix, though other 'non-standard' codes are also used. This code describes to employers how much tax to deduct from an employee. The code is either provided by the taxpayer to their employer from their P45, or more normally, by HMRC direct to their employer. Although holding an NI number is not a prerequisite for working in the UK, a tax code cannot be operated without one.

Tax codes are usually adjusted once a year to take into account any changes made in the National Budget, but can be altered more often to reflect an employee's circumstances. Tax codes can be changed if someone has paid too much or too little tax the previous tax year, if an employee receives state benefits, or has non-PAYE income (for example, self-employed earnings). Changes in a tax code are to ensure the employee has paid the correct amount of tax by the end of each tax year.

Tax codes are transferred between periods of employment by form P45 (Note: A P45 is only relevant to the tax year in which it was issued - it should only be used for new employments within the same tax year), which is generated when a person leaves a job. If a P45 is mislaid or not supplied at the end of a period of employment, a P46 can be filled out in order to determine which tax code is applicable to a person. Between submitting a P46 and receiving the correct tax code from HM Revenue and Customs, an employer can apply the emergency tax code on a week 1 basis. In this case, tax will be calculated as if the employee is working in the first week of the tax year, and all previous earnings are ignored.

At the end of each tax year employers are required to send out a P60 which documents the total earnings and tax a person has paid within that tax year. However, this only applies if the employee was still in employment (or on the payroll) on 5. April (the last day of the tax year).

== Tax free Personal allowances ==
Tax codes followed by the letter L represent the size of tax free personal allowance on earnings. This is the total amount of money, per year, one can earn tax free. The number attached to them represents tax free earnings divided by 10. In the tax year 2021/2022 the standard tax free allowance on income was £12 570, which means the standard code, and the emergency tax code was 1257L. Until 2016, persons over 65 and 75 had an increased personal allowance.

Tax free Personal allowances can only be taken once across earnings. A second job or a job with a pension is taxed at a basic rate of 20%, or the tax allowance can be split across both sources of income.

Non-standard codes are used when usual tax free allowances do not apply. Where no allowances exist, or if no code can be operated for any reason, code BR is used to tax at basic rate (20%); code D0 is used to tax at higher rate (40%) and code D1 is used to tax at the additional rate (45%). If no tax is to be collected, code NT is used.

If tax has to be collected on an income above PAYE earnings, a K code is used. This works as equivalent to a negative tax allowance. Alternatively, the employee may have a reduced personal allowance for the following tax year.
