= Termination of employment in Argentina =

In Argentina, termination of employment occurs when an employer ends an employee's contract, either with or without a specific reason. As the requirements to proceed with a termination of employment and the consequences of the decision are regulated by each piece of legislation, there are differences depending on the country whose legislation is to be applied. This article refers exclusively to termination of employees who, having worked in Argentina, are governed by the laws of that country.

In Argentina, the dismissal of workers is governed by the Labor Contract Law (LCL), established by Law 20744 in 1974, with later updates and additional rules. In 1976, Decree 390/76 was issued, which approved an ordered text reflecting these reforms, which is why it is sometimes referred to as Law 20744 (o.t. decree 390/76).

== Employment stability ==
=== Concept and classification ===
Employment stability is the right of the employee to keep their employment as long as there is no just cause for termination. Legal systems aimed at protecting stability can be classified as follows:

- Stability or absolute stability: if there is no just cause, the termination is considered null and void, the employer's obligations subsist, including the payment of salaries, and the reinstatement to employment is ordered. Failure to reinstate the employee generates consequences that vary according to the chosen model:
  - The employer must reinstate the terminated employee. If they fail to do so, they may face penalties.
  - If the employer does not reinstate the employee, the employee is only entitled to compensation.
- Improper or relative stability: the worker terminated without cause is entitled to a severance payment which, depending on the legislation, may be:
  - Tariffed, it is calculated on the basis of objective data (in general, length of service and remuneration).
  - Non-tariffed, the judge fixes it according to the damage caused by the termination. In this case, the personal circumstances of the employee, such as dependent family, difficulty in obtaining new employment, age, etc. are relevant.

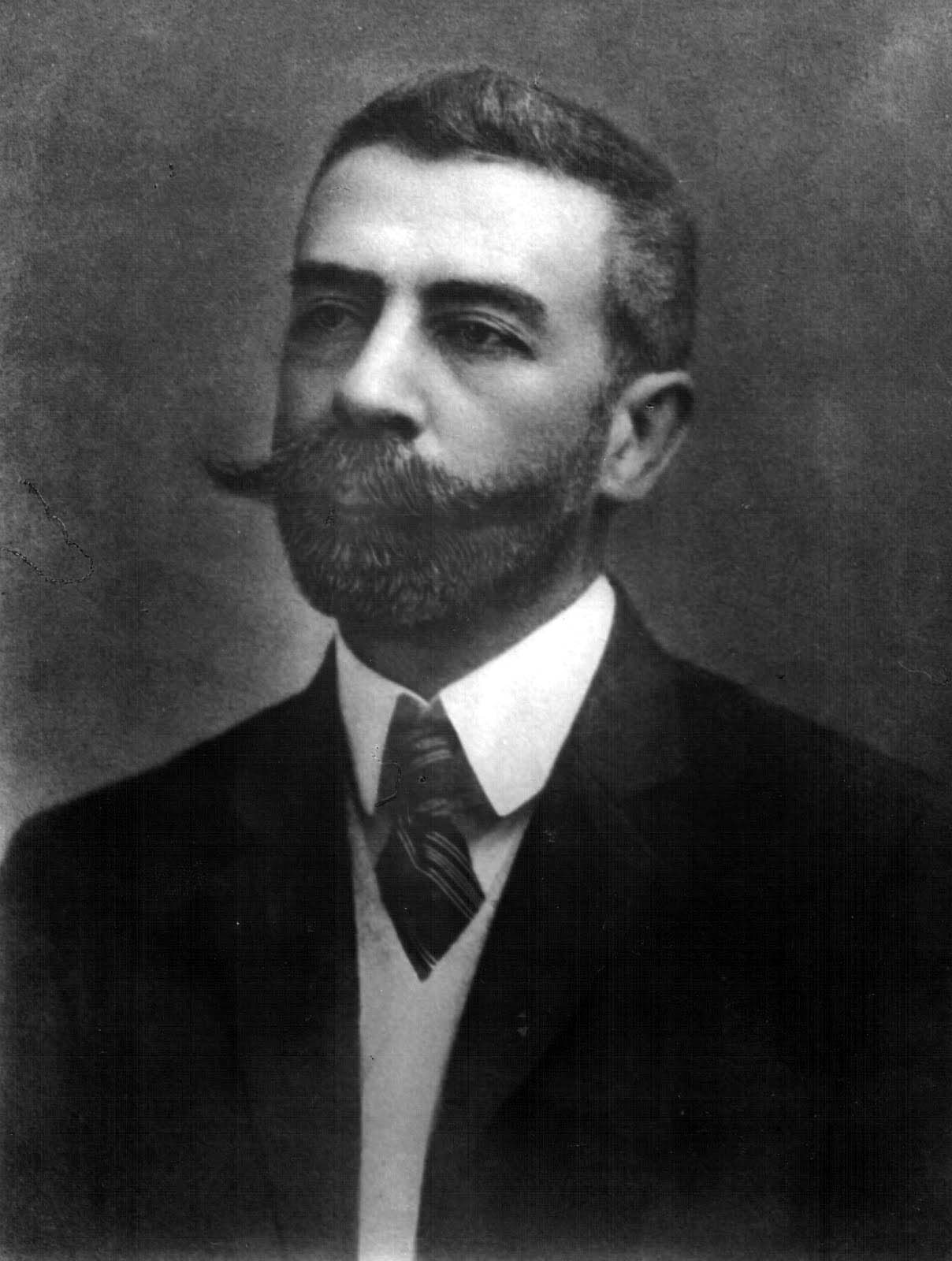
Joaquín Víctor González (1863–1923) author in 1904 of the first draft of the Labor Code in Argentina, which was not approved.

=== Legal regime in Argentina ===
The 1957 reform of the Argentine Constitution introduced Article 14 bis, giving employees the right to protection against unfair dismissal. Before 1957, protective laws already existed, but the reform strengthened these laws and gave judges more power to enforce them, even allowing judges to overturn dismissals in extreme cases.

In Argentina, bank and insurance employees once had a system of absolute job stability, allowing them to keep earning their salaries until retirement unless they were fired for a valid reason. However, the country's Supreme Court later declared this system unconstitutional, and it was repealed.

Most employees in Argentina now have a system of relative stability, introduced by Law 11729 in 1932. This means they only receive compensation if dismissed. The exception is union representatives, who still have absolute job stability, discussed in another section.

=== Stability due to union activity ===
Staff delegates, internal commissions and similar bodies exercising their functions in the workplace, as well as employees who, due to occupying elective or representative positions in trade union associations with trade union status, in bodies requiring trade union representation, or in political positions in the public authorities, cease to render services for a period of one year as from the end of their term of office (articles 50 and 51 of Law 23551), are entitled to union stability.

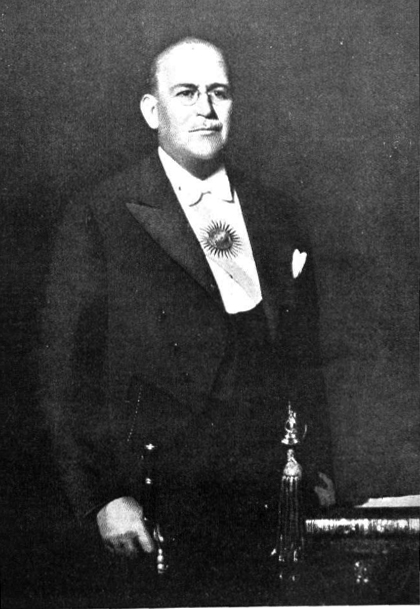
Agustín P. Justo, under whose presidency Law 11729 was passed in 1932, establishing for the first time in the country severance payments for termination.

The same benefit is valid for six months for those who apply for a union representation position. Employees with union stability can only be terminated if just cause is invoked and there is prior judicial authorization. If the termination does not meet these conditions, the affected party may sue for reinstatement in their position, plus the salaries paid during the judicial process.

If the reinstatement is decided, the judge may impose fines on the employer who does not comply with the final decision. The employee, except in the case of a non-elected candidate, may choose to consider the labor relationship terminated by virtue of the employer's decision, placing them in a situation of indirect dismissal, in which case they will be entitled to receive, in addition to severance pay, a sum equivalent to the amount of the remunerations that would have corresponded to them during the remaining term of office and the subsequent year of stability. If the employee is a non-elected candidate, they shall be entitled to receive, in addition to the indemnities and the remunerations attributable to the period of stability not yet exhausted, the amount of one more year's remunerations (art. 52 Law 23551).

== Regime of the Labor Contract Law ==
=== Scope of application ===
The LCL applies to all employees with the exception of:

a) those dependent on the Municipal, Provincial or National Public Administration, except when they are included therein or in the regime of collective bargaining agreements by express act.

b) domestic workers.

c) agricultural workers (article 3 LCL).

There are also special statutes referring to workers in certain activities for which the application of the LCL will be conditioned to the application of its provisions being compatible with the nature and modalities of the activity in question and with the specific legal regime to which it is subject (art. 3 LCL).

=== Probationary period ===
Employment contracts are typically considered probationary for the first three months, except for seasonal or fixed-term contracts.

During the probationary period, the employer can end the employment without a reason and without paying compensation, but they must give advance notice. The probationary period doesn’t apply if the employer had already hired the worker before using a probationary period. It also doesn’t apply if the employer failed to officially record the employee at the start of their employment. In these situations, the employer is considered to have waived the probationary period (Art. 92 bis LCL). Some specific laws with different rules on probationary periods are discussed below.

=== Employment contracts term ===
The employment contract shall be understood to be entered into for an indefinite term, unless its term results from the following circumstances:

a) The duration of the term has been expressly fixed in writing.

b) The, reasonably assessed, nature of the tasks or the activity, justifies it.

The formalization of successive fixed-term contracts, which exceeds the requirements set forth in paragraph b) of this article, converts the contract into an indefinite-term contract (article 90 LCL). The burden of proof that the contract is for a fixed term is on the employer (article 92 LCL). The fixed-term employment contract will last until the expiration of the agreed term, and may not be entered into for more than five years (article 93 LCL).

=== Conversion of a fixed-term contract into an indefinite-term contract ===
The parties must give notice of the termination of the contract more than one month and less than two months prior to the expiration of the agreed term, except in those cases in which the contract is for a fixed term and its duration is less than one month. If the latter fails to do so, it will be understood that it accepts the conversion of the contract to an indefinite term, unless an express act of renewal for a term equal to or different from that originally foreseen, and without prejudice to the provisions of article 90, second part, of this law (art. 94 LCL).

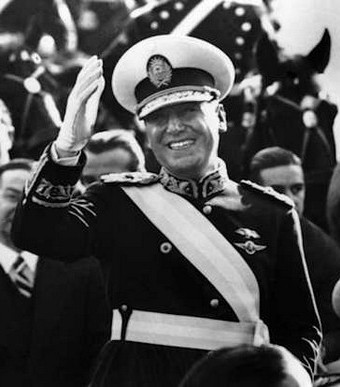
As Secretary of Labor, Juan Domingo Perón, promoted Decree-Law 33302/1945 of December 20, 1945, doubling severance payments.

=== Computation of seniority in employment ===
For all purposes of the law, seniority in employment shall be considered taken into account:

a) the time worked since the beginning of the relationship;

b) that which corresponds to the successive term contracts entered into by the parties;

c) the time of previous service, when the employee, having left the job for any reason, returns to work for the same employer (art. 18 LCL).

d) the notice period when it has been granted (art. 19 LCL).

e) the probationary period (art. 92 bis LCL).

f) the days in which they did not work due to legal or conventional leave, or because they were affected by an incurable illness or work-related accident, or for other causes not attributable to the employee (art. 152 LCL).

g) the period during which the employee does not perform work because they have been called to perform compulsory military service, by ordinary call-up, mobilization or special summons (art. 214 LCL).

h) the period during which the employee does not perform work due to holding elective office at the national, provincial or municipal level (art. 215 LCL).

i) the period during which the employee does not perform tasks due to occupying elective or representative positions in professional associations of workers with union status or in organizations or commissions that require union representation at the national, provincial or municipal level (art. 217 LCL).

j) the period of maternity leave (art. 177 LCL).

=== Retired worker. Referral ===
Regarding the retired worker who returns to work for the same employer, see art. 253 LCL.

=== Notice of termination ===
==== Concept ====
It is the advance notice given by one of the parties to the employment contract to the other that it is going to terminate the employment contract. It is intended to avoid or, at least, mitigate the damage caused to one of the parties by the untimely termination of the employment contract decided by the other party. The notice can only be withdrawn by mutual agreement and must be in writing. During the notice period, the obligations arising from the employment contract subsist (art. 238 LCL). When the termination is due to a justified cause, neither the obligation to give prior notice nor the obligation to pay the substitutive indemnity apply.

==== Notice periods ====
In the case of an employment contract for an indefinite term, when the parties do not fix a longer term, notice must be given with the following anticipation:

a) by the employee, fifteen days;

b) by the employer, fifteen days when the employee is in a probationary period; one month when the employee has been employed for a period not exceeding five years and two months when the employee has been employed for more than five years (article 231 LCL).

The terms will run from the day following the day of the notice (art. 233 LCL).

In fixed-term contracts, the parties must give notice of termination of the contract not less than one month nor more than two months prior to the expiration of the agreed term, except in those cases in which the contract is for a fixed term and its duration is less than one month. If the latter fails to do so, it will be understood that it accepts the conversion of the contract as an indefinite term, unless an express act of renewal for a term equal to or different from that originally foreseen (Art. 94 LCL).

==== Notice and suspension of rendering of services ====
The notice given to the employee while the rendering of services is suspended due to any of the causes entitled to the payment of wages by the employee, will have no effect, unless it has been expressly granted to begin to run from the moment in which the cause of suspension of the rendering of services ceases.

When the notice is given during a suspension of the rendering of services that does not accrue wages in favor of the employee, the notice will be valid but from the time of the notice and until the end of its term the relevant remunerations will accrue. If the suspension of the employment contract or of the rendering of services is supervening the notification of the notice, the term of the notice will be suspended until the reasons that originated it cease to exist (art. 239 LCL).

==== Compensation for failure to give notice ====
The party that omits to give notice or gives insufficient notice must pay to the other party a substitute indemnity equivalent to the remuneration that would correspond to the employee during those periods (Art. 232 LCL). This rule binds both the employee and the employer. When the termination of the employment contract ordered by the employer occurs without prior notice and on a date that does not coincide with the last day of the month, the substitutive indemnity due to the employee will be integrated with an amount equal to the wages for the days missing until the last day of the month in which the dismissal took place. The integration of the month of dismissal will not be applicable when the termination occurs during the probationary period established in article 92 bis (art. 233 LCL).

==== Employee's rights during the notice period granted by the employer ====
During the period of notice, the employee will have the right, without reduction of salary, to take a leave of absence of two hours per day within the legal working day, being able to opt for the first two or the last two hours of the working day. The worker may also choose to accumulate the hours of leave in one or more full working days (art. 237 LCL). When the notice has been given by the employer, the employee may consider the employment contract terminated before the expiration of the term, without the right to remuneration for the missing period of notice, but will retain the right to receive the indemnity that corresponds to them by virtue of the termination. This manifestation must be made in one of the forms provided for the resignation from employment (art. 236 LCL).

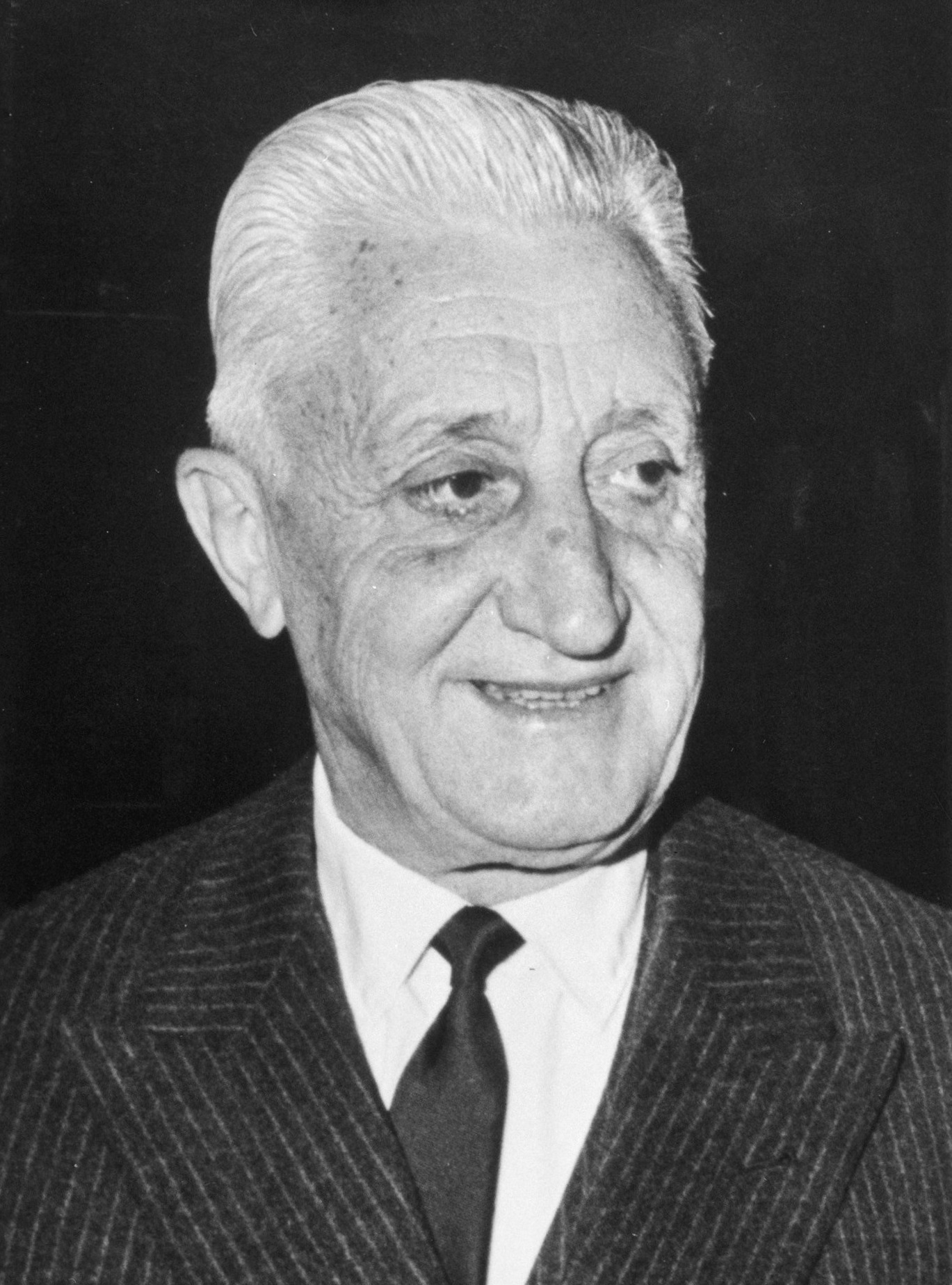
Under the presidency of Arturo Umberto Illia, Law 16881 was passed on May 19, 1966, which increased severance payments, but was later repealed by Juan Carlos Onganía.

=== Termination by the employer or the employee for just cause ===
One of the parties may denounce the employment contract in case of non-observance by the other party of the obligations resulting therefrom which constitute an injury and which, due to its seriousness, does not allow the continuation of the relationship. The assessment shall be made prudentially by the judges, taking into consideration the nature of the relationship resulting from an employment contract, according to the provisions of this law, and the modalities and personal circumstances in each case (art. 242 LCL). When the employee terminates the employment contract invoking just cause, it is also said that they "places themself in a situation of dismissal" or that it is an "indirect dismissal". The word "injury" used in the article does not have the meaning of "insult" that is given to it in criminal law and in common parlance, but rather that of moral or material damage to the interests of the other party.

As will be seen in the following points, the situation of injury can be arrived at in two ways: a single fact whose seriousness justifies the breach or a fact that by itself would not authorize it but when appreciated together with other breaches justifies the breach.

==== Requirements to be met by the fault invoked by the employer for termination ====
For termination to be justified, the measure must be:

a) proportionate to the fault or non-compliance of the worker (arts. 67 and 242 LCL).

The misconduct committed by the employee must be so serious that, reasonably appreciated, it does not allow the continuity of the contract;

b) contemporaneous with the employer's knowledge of the alleged fault. The period of time that elapses between this knowledge and the communication of the termination must not exceed that reasonably necessary according to the circumstances of the case to gather the elements of judgment and make the decision. This lapse of time is very variable: sometimes the knowledge of the fault is immediate and sometimes the investigation to verify the facts and responsibilities takes some time.

c) does not violate the principle of double jeopardy.

If the employer has already sanctioned the employee (for example, by suspending them), they cannot later terminate them for the same fact. It does not violate this principle to take into account the sanctions already applied to determine the consequences of a new misconduct.

==== Communication of the cause and invariability ====
Both the termination for just cause by the employer and the termination of the employment contract based on just cause by the employee must be communicated in writing, with a sufficiently clear expression of the reasons on which the termination of the contract is based. In the event of a lawsuit filed by the interested party, the modification of the grounds for termination set forth in the aforementioned communications will not be admitted (art. 243 LCL).

==== Some causes of direct termination ====
As the judge is the one who must assess the justification for termination, the casuistry on the subject is very varied and each situation has its own particular circumstances, notwithstanding the fact that some general principles can be extracted from the judgment to help in the interpretation. Unexcused absences from work or lack of punctuality are grounds for termination, but judges require that they be of a certain frequency or extent and that they have not been tolerated, i.e. that there have been sanctions, and that the employee's seniority in the job is also relevant.

If, to terminate the contract, abandonment of work by the employee is invoked, the prior constitution in default is indispensable, by means of an intimation made in a reliable manner to return to work, for the term imposed by the modalities that result in each case (art. 244 LCL).

If it is alleged that the employee committed a crime (for example, theft), the termination can only be considered justified if the employer then files a criminal complaint and obtains a conviction. In this case, the labor judge cannot issue a sentence until there is a definitive resolution in the criminal proceeding.

Suspensions based on disciplinary reasons or due to lack or reduction of work not attributable to the employer, may not exceed thirty days in one year (article 220 LCL) and if they are due to force majeure duly proven, seventy-five days in one year (article 221 LCL), in both cases counted from the first suspension, regardless of the reason thereof. Any suspension ordered by the employer of those provided for in articles 219, 220 and 221 which exceeds the terms established or as a whole and whatever the reason for it, of ninety days in a year, starting from the first suspension and not accepted by the employee, will entitle the latter to consider themselves terminated (article 222 LCL). The employee may consider the employment contract terminated if, as a result of the transfer of the establishment, they suffers a loss which, assessed in accordance with the criteria of article 242, justifies the act of denunciation. For this purpose, special consideration will be given to cases in which, by reason of the transfer, the purpose of the operation is changed, the functions, position or employment is altered, or if there is a separation between different sections, dependencies or branches of the company, in such a way that the employer's patrimonial liability is diminished (article 226 LCL).

In some cases, to consider the employee's decision to be justified, judges require them to previously request the employer in a documented manner to comply with the obligation they are claiming. Such are the cases of termination based on a refusal to give them tasks, to recognize their actual date of entry or their actual salary, to pay them the remuneration, etc.

==== Indemnity for seniority or termination ====
In cases of termination without just cause, the employee is entitled to an indemnity of one month's salary for each year of service or fraction of more than three months, based on the best monthly, normal and customary remuneration earned during the last year or during the time of rendering of services, whichever is less. Such basis may not exceed the equivalent of three times the monthly amount of the sum resulting from the average of all the remunerations provided for in the collective bargaining agreement applicable to the employee. Such amount shall be fixed and calculated by the Ministry of Labor, Employment and Social Security. For workers paid on commission or with variable remunerations and for those excluded from the collective bargaining agreement, the limit will be that of the agreement applicable to the establishment where the employee renders services or to the most favorable agreement, in the event that there is more than one. The amount of the indemnity may in no case be less than one month's salary calculated on the basis of the system established in the first paragraph (art. 245 LCL). When the employee is considered to be terminated with just cause, they will be entitled to severance payments for seniority, lack of prior notice and integration of the month of termination (art. 246 LCL). The Argentine Supreme Court of Justice in its decision of September 14, 2004 in the case "Vizzoti, Carlos Alberto v. AMSA S.A. s/ despido" declared the unconstitutionality of the limit to the base salary provided in article 245 of the LCL and provided that the calculation base could not be less than 67% of the employee's actual remuneration.

==== Deduction of severance payments received for previous terminations ====
If the employee has been reinstated by the same employer, the severance payments of articles 245, 246, 247, 247, 250, 251, 253 and 254 will be deducted from the severance payments of articles 245, 246, 247, 250, 251, 253 and 254 for the same concept for previous terminations. In such cases, the amount of the indemnities to be deducted will be updated taking into account the variation resulting from the official wage index of the industrial laborer of the Federal Capital from the date of the original payment until the new indemnity amount; in no case may the resulting indemnity be less than that which would have corresponded to the worker if his period of service had been only the last one and regardless of the periods prior to the reinstatement (article 255 LCL).

==== Termination for economic reasons ====
In cases of termination due to force majeure or due to lack or reduction of work not attributable to the employer and duly justified, the employee shall be entitled to receive a severance payment equivalent to half of that provided for in Article 245 of this Law. In such cases termination shall begin with the least senior personnel within each specialty. In the case of personnel hired in the same six-month period, dismissal shall begin with the one who has the least family responsibilities, even if this alters the order of seniority (Article 247 LCL). The courts interpret these rules in such a restrictive manner that in practice this reduction of severance pay does not apply.

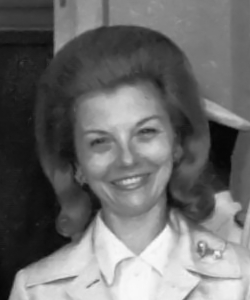
María Estela Martínez (1931), under whose presidency Law 20744 was enacted on September 20, 1974, approving the Labor Contract Law.

==== Termination due to the employee's retirement ====
When the employee meets the necessary requirements to obtain one of the benefits provided for in Law 24241 (retirement or pension), the employer may require the employee to initiate the pertinent procedures by issuing the certificates of services and other documentation necessary for such purposes. From that moment on, the employer must maintain the employment relationship until the worker obtains the benefit and for a maximum term of one year. Once the benefit has been granted, or upon expiration of such term, the employment contract will be terminated without any obligation for the employer to pay the indemnity for seniority provided for in the laws or professional statutes. The notice referred to in the first paragraph of this article shall imply the notification of the notice established by the present law or similar provisions contained in other statutes, which term shall be deemed to be included within the term during which the employer must maintain the employment relationship (art. 252 LCL).

==== Case of a retired worker ====
In the event that the worker who is the holder of a social security benefit under any regime should return to work as an employee, without this implying a violation of the legislation in force, the employer may terminate the contract by invoking this situation, with the obligation to give prior notice and pay the compensation based on the seniority provided for in Article 245 of this law or, if applicable, the provisions of Article 247. In this case, only the time of service after termination will be counted as seniority (Article 253 LCL).

=== Situation of employees according to the type of contracting method ===
==== Termination before expiration in fixed-term contracts ====
In fixed-term contracts, termination without just cause before the expiration of the term of the contract will entitle the employee, in addition to the corresponding indemnities, to compensation for damages and prejudices fixed on the basis of the damages and prejudices justified by the person alleging them or those which, in the absence of proof, are prudentially determined by the judge or court, for the sole reason of the early termination of the contract. If the time remaining to fulfill the term of the contract is equal to or greater than that corresponding to the notice period, the recognition of the indemnity for damages will replace that corresponding to the omission of the latter, if the amount recognized is also equal to or greater than the wages of the same (art. 95 LCL).

==== Seasonal employment ====
The seasonal contract or seasonal employment contract is a contract which, in principle, is for an indefinite period of time even if the provision of services is discontinuous, inasmuch as the employee constitutes a normal element of the company whose tasks are periodically necessary and are coordinated with a need that occurs in certain periods of the year foreseen with a certain fixity.

The LCL states that there will be a seasonal employment contract when the relationship between the parties, originated by activities inherent to the normal course of business of the company or operation, is performed only at certain times of the year and is subject to be repeated in each cycle due to the nature of the activity (article 96 LCL). The employee acquires the rights that this law assigns to permanent employees of continuous service, as from his hiring in the first season, if this also responds to the permanent needs of the company or operation carried out, with the modality provided in this chapter (article 97 LCL). The termination without cause of the worker, pending the foreseen or foreseeable terms of the cycle or season in which they were rendering services, will give rise to the payment of the compensations established in article 95, first paragraph, of this law (art. 96 LCL).

==== Temporary employment contract ====
Whatever its denomination, a temporary employment contract will be deemed to exist when the employee's activity is performed under the dependence of an employer for the satisfaction of specific results, considered by the latter, in relation to extraordinary services determined in advance or extraordinary and transitory requirements of the company, operation or establishment, whenever a certain term for the termination of the contract cannot be foreseen. It will also be understood that such type of relationship exists when the relationship begins and ends with the performance of the work, the execution of the act or the rendering of the service for which the employee was hired. The employer who claims that the contract is of this type shall be responsible for proving his assertion (art. 99 LCL). The benefits under this law shall apply to temporary employees, as long as they are compatible with the nature of the relationship and meet the requirements to which the acquisition of the right to such benefits is conditioned (art. 100 LCT).

=== Terminations with aggravated severance payments ===
==== Termination for maternity reasons ====
Women have maternity leave during the forty-five days prior to childbirth and up to forty-five days after childbirth. The interested party may choose to have her pre-birth leave reduced, which in such case shall not be less than thirty (30) days; the remainder of the total leave period shall be accumulated to the post-birth rest period. In case of pre-term birth, the entire period of leave not taken before the birth shall be accumulated to the subsequent rest period, to complete the ninety days. The worker must give reliable notice of her pregnancy to the employer, with the presentation of a medical certificate stating the presumed date of delivery, or request its verification by the employer (art. 177 LCL). When the employee is terminated within seven and a half months before or after the date of delivery, provided that she has complied with her obligation to notify and prove the fact of pregnancy and, if applicable, the childbirth, it is presumed, unless there is evidence to the contrary, that the termination is due to maternity or pregnancy. Under such conditions, it will give rise to the payment of an indemnity equal to that provided for in article 182 of this law (art. 178 LCL).

==== Termination for cause of marriage ====
It is considered that the termination responds to the aforementioned cause when it was ordered without a cause being invoked by the employer, or when the cause invoked was not proven, and the termination took place within the three months prior to or six months after the marriage and provided that the employer had been duly notified of it, and this notification could not be made before or after the periods indicated (arts. 180 and 181 LCL).

The majority of case law considers that this rule does not apply to male employees.

In the event of non-compliance with this prohibition, the employer will pay an indemnity equivalent to one year's remuneration, which will be added to the indemnity established in Article 245 (Article 182 LCL).

==== Termination of a non-registered employee or with deficient registration ====
Inexistent registration is when the worker has not been registered in the labor books or before the social security agencies, and deficient registration is when the worker is registered with a date of entry later than the actual date, with a remuneration lower than the actual remuneration received by the employee, or when both cases occur simultaneously. To help detect and combat these practices that lead to the evasion of the payment of mandatory social security contributions on remunerations and hinder the exercise of employees' rights, it was established that if the employee is terminated without just cause in such situation, they will be entitled to receive an additional indemnity equivalent to the amount of the indemnities for termination (articles 8, 9, 10 and 15 of Law 24013 and article 1 of Law 25323).

== Special statutes ==
=== Employees who are also governed by the Labor Contract Law ===
Only the points in which the particular statute modifies the general termination regime of the LCL are included.

==== Rental housing and condominium building managers ====
These are people who work in buildings divided by floors or units, also called concierge. After sixty days of work, in the event of termination without just cause, they are entitled to three months' notice and a seniority indemnity of one month's salary for each year of service or fraction thereof (art. 6* law 12981).

==== Professional journalists ====
These are persons who work for journalistic companies in the various tasks involved in journalism. They are entitled to one month's notice of termination if they have been employed for less than three years and two months' notice if they have been employed for more than three years. If the employer does not give notice, he must pay a substitute indemnity equal to twice the notice. In case of termination without cause, the employer must pay: 1) an indemnity of one month's salary for each year of service or fraction of more than three months, with a minimum equivalent to two months' salary and 2) an additional indemnity equivalent to six months' salary (art. 43 of Law 12908).

==== Administrative employees of newspaper companies ====
These include those who perform administrative tasks in journalistic companies. In case of termination without cause the employer must pay an indemnity of one month's salary for each year of service and six months' salary for notice (art. 33 decree-law 12839/46 and art. 2* law 13502).

==== Construction workers ====
They are also known as bricklayers. They are excluded from the termination and notice of termination indemnity regime. Instead, in the event of termination, whatever the cause, they receive an unemployment fund which is integrated by the employer with a percentage of the remunerations paid (Law 22250). The Supreme Court of Justice declared that its purpose is to cover the risk of loss of employment, whatever the cause, given the versatility of the construction activity and that it complies with the constitutional right to protection against arbitrary termination. On the contrary, Juan Carlos Fernández Madrid affirms that this regime "does not strictly imply protection against arbitrary termination since it is an accumulative fund that is formed by the employer to be delivered at the moment of termination — whatever the cause — and therefore does not constitute a deterrent to arbitrary termination".

==== Practitioners of the healing arts in private establishments ====
These are physicians and other professionals in the art of healing who work in private health care establishments. They can only be terminated with just cause by the employer after the corresponding summary proceedings have been held (art. 6 decree-law 22212/45).

==== Teachers in private educational establishments ====
They are those who teach in private schools. They can only be terminated with just cause by the employer after the corresponding summary proceedings have been conducted by the competent official authority (art. 13 law 13047).

=== Workers excluded from the labor contract law ===
==== Domestic worker ====
These are people who work in family homes in domestic tasks and are governed by Law 26844. The personnel without retirement are those who work for an employer and reside in the domicile where they do so and personnel with retirement are those who work for an employer but do not reside in the place where they do so. There is a trial period of thirty days for non-retired personnel and fifteen days for retired personnel, during which the employee may be terminated without severance pay. After this period, if the employer decides to terminate without cause, it must give ten days' notice if the employee's seniority is less than one year and thirty days' notice if it is more, or pay an indemnity equivalent to the salaries of that period. In addition, it must pay an indemnity of one month's salary per year of seniority or fraction of more than three months, based on the best monthly, normal and customary remuneration earned in the last year or during the time of service if this is less.

==== Agricultural worker ====
These are people who work in rural areas. In case of termination without just cause, they must receive an indemnity equivalent to one month's salary for each year of service or fraction of more than three months, and the calculation basis may not exceed the amount of three salaries according to the average of the remunerations established by the National Commission of Agrarian Work. The total indemnity cannot be less than two salaries according to the worker's actual remuneration. To this amount is added an amount according to this scale: 20% when the seniority is less than ten years, 15% when it is between ten and twenty years and 10% when it is more than twenty years (art. 76 law 22248).

== Civil indemnities ==
The indemnities provided for in the LCL are tariffed, i.e., their amount compensates all the damages derived from the termination of the employment contract. However, there are certain cases of termination in which the employer's conduct at the time of the termination constitutes by itself a wrongful act that generates additional damages to those derived from the termination. In such cases, the judges have considered that, in addition to the indemnities of the LCL, the payment of an indemnity based on the Civil Code was appropriate.

The employer's unlawful act may be prior to the termination (for example, the case of the employer who carried out the sexual harassment that the employee invoked to consider themself terminated) or simultaneous with the termination (the case in which the employer falsely invoked that the employee had committed a criminal offense) or after the termination (case in which after the termination the employer placed a notice on the company's bulletin board informing that the termination had been ordered because the employee had taken money from the company).

== See also ==
- Employment contract

== Bibliography ==
- Vázquez Vialard, Antonio Luis J. (1982). Tratado del derecho del trabajo (6 tomos) (in Spanish). Buenos Aires: Editorial Astrea. ISBN 950-008-033-8.
- López, Justo; Centeno, Norberto; Fernández Madrid, Juan Carlos (1978). Ley de Contrato de Trabajo comentada (in Spanish). Buenos Aires: de Contabilidad Moderna.
- Poclava Lafuente, Juan Carlos; et al. (1996). Ley de contrato de Trabajo (in Spanish). Buenos Aires: Manuales de Jurisprudencia La Ley S.A. ISBN 950-527-163-8.
- Álvarez Chávez, Víctor Hugo (1985). El despido (in Spanish). Buenos Aires: Manuales de Jurisprudencia La Ley S.A. ISBN 950-527-023-2.
- Ackerman, Mario E.; Ramírez Bosco, Luis; Sala Franco, Tomás; Raso Delgue, Juan (2014). Tratado de Derecho del Trabajo (in Spanish) (2nd ed.). Buenos Aires: Rubinzal-Culzoni Editores. ISBN 978-987-30-0442-1.
- Fernández Madrid, Juan Carlos (2007). Tratado práctico de Derecho del Trabajo (in Spanish) (3rd ed.). Buenos Aires: La Ley. ISBN 978-987-03-1099-0.
- de la Fuente, Horacio (1976). Principios jurídicos del derecho a la estabilidad (in Spanish). Buenos Aires: Zavalía.
- de Diego, Julián A. (2011). Tratado del despido y otras formas d extinción (in Spanish) (1st ed.). Buenos Aires: La Ley. ISBN 978-987-03-2030-2.
