= P60 =

Tax reference code

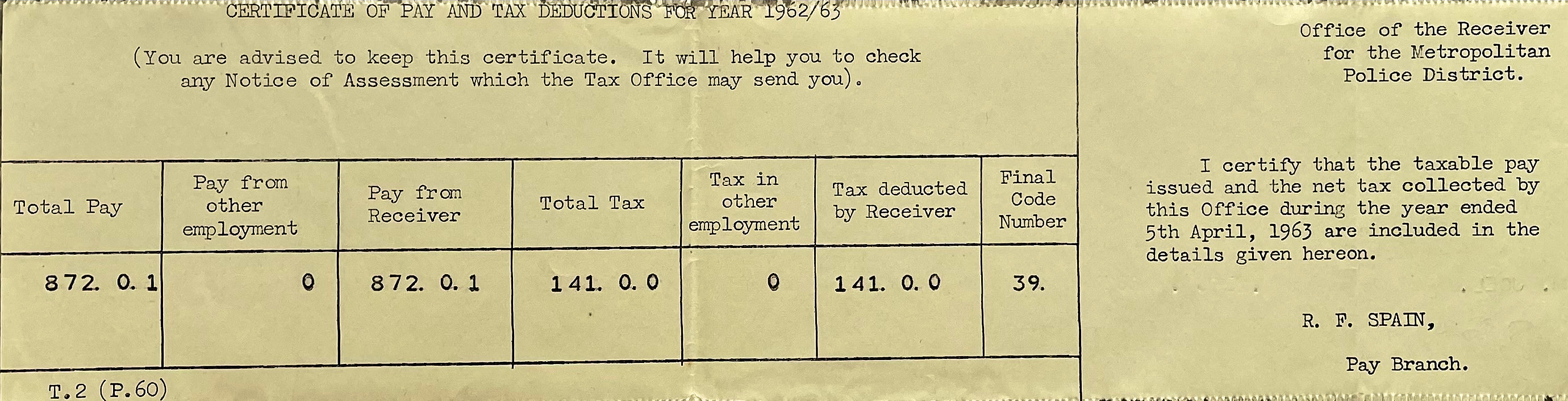
A P60 End of Year Certificate

In the United Kingdom, a P60 (End of Year Certificate) is a statement issued to taxpayers at the end of a tax year. It is important a taxpayer does not destroy the P60 forms issued to them, as they form a vital part of the proof that tax has been paid. They were also issued in Ireland until the 2018 tax year.

== Ireland ==
In Ireland, P60s were abolished from 1 January 2019.

In 2018 and previous years, it detailed a taxpayer's taxable income and deductions made by PAYE, PRSI (Pay Related Social Insurance), health levy, and Universal Social Charge (which replaced the income levy that had started in 2009) for that year. If the taxpayer's liability to tax for any year needed to be reviewed, they would need to send one part of the Form P60 to their Revenue Office. If they needed to claim a Social Welfare benefit, they would send the second part to the Department of Social Protection as evidence that they had paid PRSI contributions.

For employers, the P60 documents for their employees accompanied other documents sent in an end-of-year package which included the P35 document. The employers then passed on the P60 to their employees.

Proprietary company directors also filled in a "Form 11" or a "Form 12 Directors" at end of year.

== United Kingdom ==
In the UK, the P60 form has been issued since 1944 by employers to each of their employees to detail the employees' taxable income and deductions made by PAYE (both for income tax and National Insurance contributions) for that year.

Historically, it was the third part of a triplicate form, the front two parts being P14 (End of Year Summary). P14 part 1 was sent to the Contributions Office, P14 part 2 was retained by the tax office with which the PAYE scheme is registered, however P60 (never referred to as P14 part 3) continues to be issued to the taxpayer. Parts 1 and 2 of the P14 were rendered redundant by RTI at the beginning of the 2013/2014 tax year.

The P60 has to be given to employees (and by the Department for Work and Pensions to those claiming taxable benefits such as Jobseeker's Allowance) by 31 May. However, this only applies if the employee was still in employment (or on the payroll) on 5 April (the last day of the tax year). (Note: If the employee leaves before 5 April, they should keep their final payslip as evidence of income received and tax deducted during that employment)

== See also ==
- Taxation in the United Kingdom
- United Kingdom employment law
- Form W-2, the equivalent for US workers paid wages or salary
- Form 1099, the equivalent for US workers paid on a freelance basis
- P45
- T4, the equivalent for Income taxes in Canada
