= System Floors (UK) Ltd v Daniel =

- Court: Employment Appeal Tribunal
- Citation: [1982] ICR 54

Court membership
- Judge sitting: Browne-Wilkinson J

Keywords
- Contract of employment, terms

System Floors (UK) Ltd v Daniel [1982] ICR 54 is a UK labour law case, concerning the construction of terms in a contract of employment.

== Facts ==
Written particulars mistakenly stated Mr Daniel started a week earlier than he in fact did. He claimed unfair dismissal, and the employer argued he did not satisfy the qualifying period for his claim.

The Tribunal found that the employer was bound by the statement made in the contract.

== Judgment ==
Browne-Wilkinson J overturned the Tribunal, and held that Mr Daniel did not satisfy the statutory qualifying period for unfair dismissal, and the mistaken statement of the employment contract did not estop the employer. He quoted Turriff Construction Ltd v Bryant (1967) ITR 292, where Lord Parker said ‘It is of course quite clear that the statement made pursuant to s.4 of the Act of 1963 is not a contract. It is not even conclusive evidence of the terms of a contract.’ This was followed in Parkes Classic Confectionery Ltd v Ashcroft (1973) 8 ITR 43, where the Divisional Court overruled an Industrial Tribunal holding that a contract had been varied, the employer failed to serve particulars and the employer was not entitled to rely on the varied contract. The contract was still variable, despite failure to serve particulars. The effect of a written statement would therefore be persuasive evidence of the contract to a court, but it would not be binding.

It provides very strong prima facie evidence of what were the terms of the contract between the parties, but does not constitute a written contract between the parties. nor are the statements of the terms finally conclusive: at most, they place a heavy burden on the employer to show that the actual terms of contract are different from those which he has set out in the statutory statement... ...In the absence of an acknowledgement by the parties that the statement is itself a contract and that the terms are correct (such as that contained in the Mercer case), the statutory statement does not itself constitute a contract in writing.

== See also ==
- UK labour law
- Robertson v British Gas Corp [1983] ICR 351, confirmed the statement is just evidence.
- Kampelmann v Landschaftsverband Westfalen-Lippe (1998) C-253/96, [1998] IRLR 333 takes the same approach.
