= Tax returns in the United Kingdom =

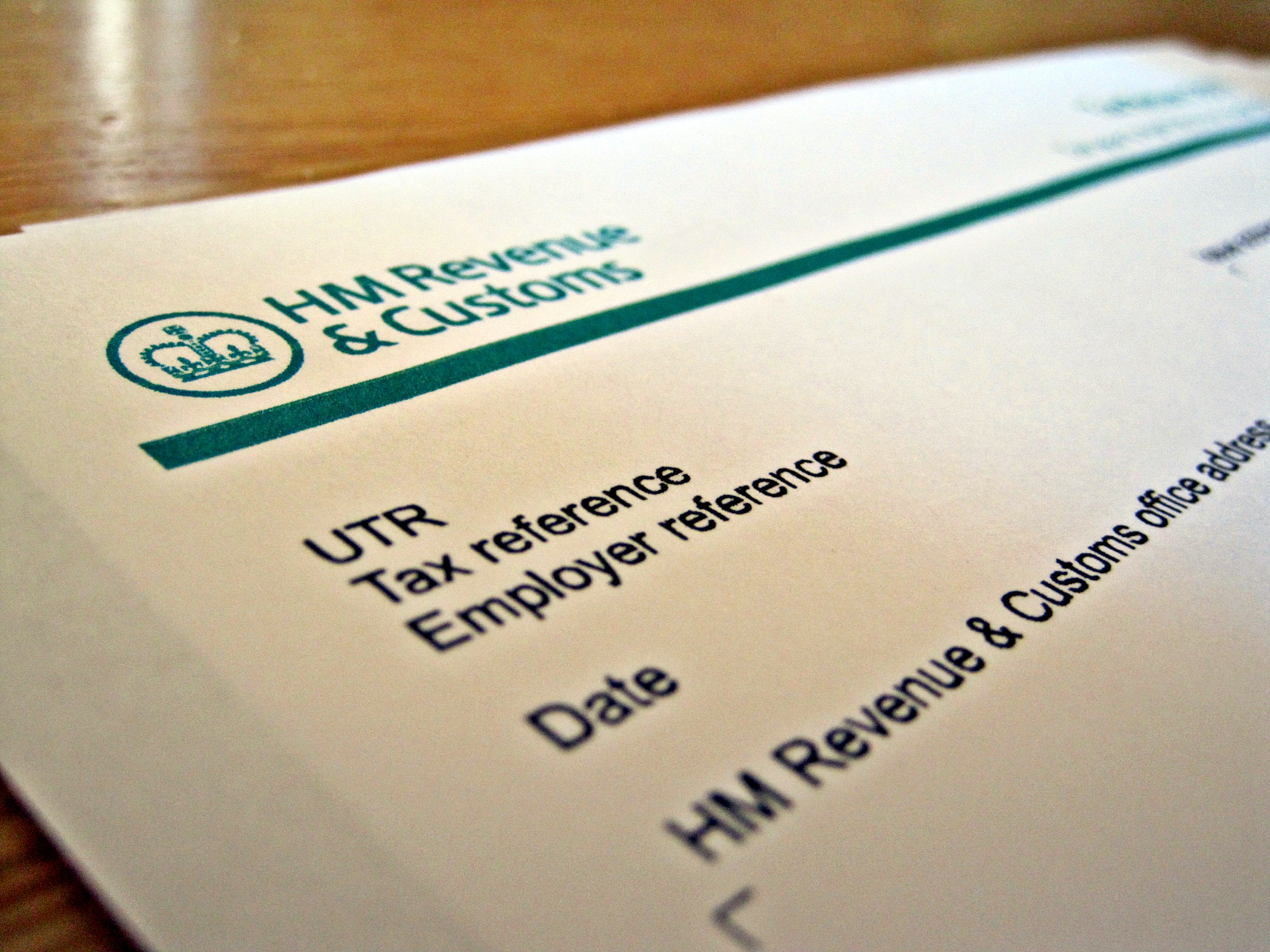
A Self Assessment (SA100) tax return

In the United Kingdom, a tax return is a document that must be filed with HM Revenue & Customs declaring liability for taxation. Different bodies must file different returns with respect to various forms of taxation. The main returns currently in use are:

- SA100 for individuals paying income tax
- SA800 for partnerships
- SA900 for trusts and estates of deceased persons
- CT600 for companies paying corporation tax
- VAT100 for value added tax

== Income tax self-assessment ==
Most employees paying tax under the PAYE system are not required to file a tax return, because the PAYE system operates to withhold the correct amount of tax from their wages or salaries. However, some taxpayers, including employees, may have income that has not been taxed at source and needs to be declared to HMRC, usually by submitting a self assessment tax return.

Legally, a tax payer is obliged to submit a tax return when HMRC request one by sending a notice to file a tax return, either because the tax payer has registered for self assessment voluntarily or because HMRC believe one to be required - HMRC can request a tax return from anyone for any reason.

Under UK tax legislation, taxpayers are obliged to notify HMRC when they have a liability to tax no later than nine months after the end of the tax year in which they became liable. Depending on the circumstances and the tax owed, they may do this by registering for self assessment and completing a tax return by 31 January.

Whilst there is no legal obligation to register for self assessment for income tax purposes when there is no liability for tax, HMRC guidance states that a tax return is required for the following reasons, some of which are not statutory:

- the self-employed including someone in a partnership
- controlling company director, but not a director of a non-profit organisation or anyone not receiving any payments or benefits
- a minister of any religion
- a name or member of Lloyd's
- income from savings and investments of £10,000 or more
- income from untaxed savings and investments of £2,500 or more
- income from property of £10,000 or more before deducting allowable expenses or £2,500 or more after deducting allowable expenses
- employment income on PAYE above £100,000
- anyone living or working abroad or is not domiciled in the UK
- having Capital Gains Tax to pay
- anyone who owes tax and it cannot be collected through the tax code. For instance when the taxable Basic State Pension, combined with other untaxed income, is greater than the Personal allowance
- anyone who has benefits in kind or out of pocket expenses which may be taxed as an employer does not have a dispensation
- parents who earn over £50,000 and need to repay Child benefit#United Kingdom

The standard form in use is the SA100, complete with additional sheets for particular sources of income. A short tax return, form SA200, is available for those with incomes below £30,000. HMRC selects those who can complete a SA200.

The tax year runs from 6 April to 5 April. Tax returns must be completed by 31 January following the end of the relevant tax year for those who complete the tax return online and by 31 October following the end of the tax year for those who file by a paper return.

Once registered, taxpayers can submit their tax return online directly via the HMRC website, or from online platforms.

== Partnerships ==
A partnership, including one in which all partners are companies, files form SA800. The partnership itself does not normally pay income tax, capital gains tax or corporation tax, but is required to provide a Partnership Statement to each partner reporting that partner's share of income and gains. Individual partners are also required to file self-assessment tax returns; although a partnership is not considered a separate legal entity like a limited company it is still a form of taxable business income.

== Trusts and estates ==
A trustee, including trustees of certain pension schemes, must file form SA900 by 31 January following the end of the relevant tax year for those who complete the tax return online and by 31 October following the end of the tax year for those who file by a paper return. A personal representative administering the estate of a deceased person must file a form SA900 if the affairs of the estate are complex. Whether or not a tax return is required, each beneficiary's share of taxable income is reported to the beneficiary on form R185.

== Corporation tax self-assessment ==
A company must file a return, using form CT600, and assess its liability to tax, normally within 12 months of the end of its accounting year.

== PAYE deductions ==
Before the advent of Real Time Information (RTI), at the end of the tax year, employers operating PAYE schemes had to report to HMRC their employees, the total that had been paid to them, the amounts of income tax and national insurance contributions (NICs) that had been deducted from those payments, and the amount of employer's NICs due. This was done on form P35.

Since 2014, this form has been obsolete and employers have been required to report this information electronically in real time.

== See also ==
- Tax return (Australia)
- Tax return (Canada)
- Tax return (United States)
