= P45 (tax) =

Tax reference code

In the United Kingdom, and formerly in Ireland, a P45 is the reference code of a document titled Details of employee leaving work. The term is used in British and Irish slang as a metonym for termination of employment. The equivalent slang term in the United States is "pink slip".

A P45 is issued by the employer when an employee leaves work.

A P45 is also issued by a pension provider when one claims their pension savings held with the pension provider. When one takes out their entire pension fund as a lump sum, a part of this amount will be considered taxable earnings, and this will need to be reported to HMRC. In such cases, one receives a P45 from the pension provider for their record. This can also be passed on to a new employer if the person continues to work.

== In the United Kingdom ==
In the UK, the front section, Part 1, is given by the old employer to HM Revenue and Customs, who then record the pay and tax details on to the individual's taxpayer record. Part 1A is to be retained by the employee, Part 2 retained by the new employer, and Part 3 taken by the new employer and sent to their tax office. The P45 contains details of earnings and tax paid during the tax year (tax paid in previous years is detailed on the P60 for that year).

A P45 is a document issued by UK employers when an employee leaves a job. It records the employee’s earnings and tax paid during the current tax year. Copies are provided to HMRC, the employee, and the new employer or job centre. The form is valid only for the tax year in which it is issued.

The "P" code refers to documents in the PAYE series, in the same way that self-assessment documents are prefixed "SA" (e.g., SA100 – Individual tax return) and tax credits paperwork is prefixed "TC" (e.g., TC600 – Tax credits application).

== In the Republic of Ireland ==
In the Republic of Ireland, P45 was also used as a reference to a form used by the Revenue Commissioners with the same function. The administrative procedures in this area were similar; however, the form itself was different in design from the UK version. The form was eliminated from 1 January 2019, having been replaced by a real-time reporting of tax details to Revenue.

== In popular culture ==
On 27 June 2007, the day of his resignation as Prime Minister, Tony Blair jokingly remarked during his final Prime Minister's Questions about receiving his P45:

I received the following communication by urgent letter yesterday:

"Details of employee leaving work: Surname Blair. First name T"—

"It actually says 'Mr., Mrs., Miss or other'"—

"This form is important to you. Take good care of it. P45."

— Tony Blair, Official Report (Hansard)

On 4 October 2017, at the annual Conservative Party conference in Manchester, Prime Minister Theresa May was handed a P45 form by prankster Simon Brodkin as a stunt claiming to be from then-Foreign Secretary Boris Johnson. Brodkin was arrested, but no charges were brought.

== See also ==
- Taxation in the United Kingdom
- United Kingdom labour law
- P60
