= Termination of employment =

End of an existing relationship between an employee and their employer

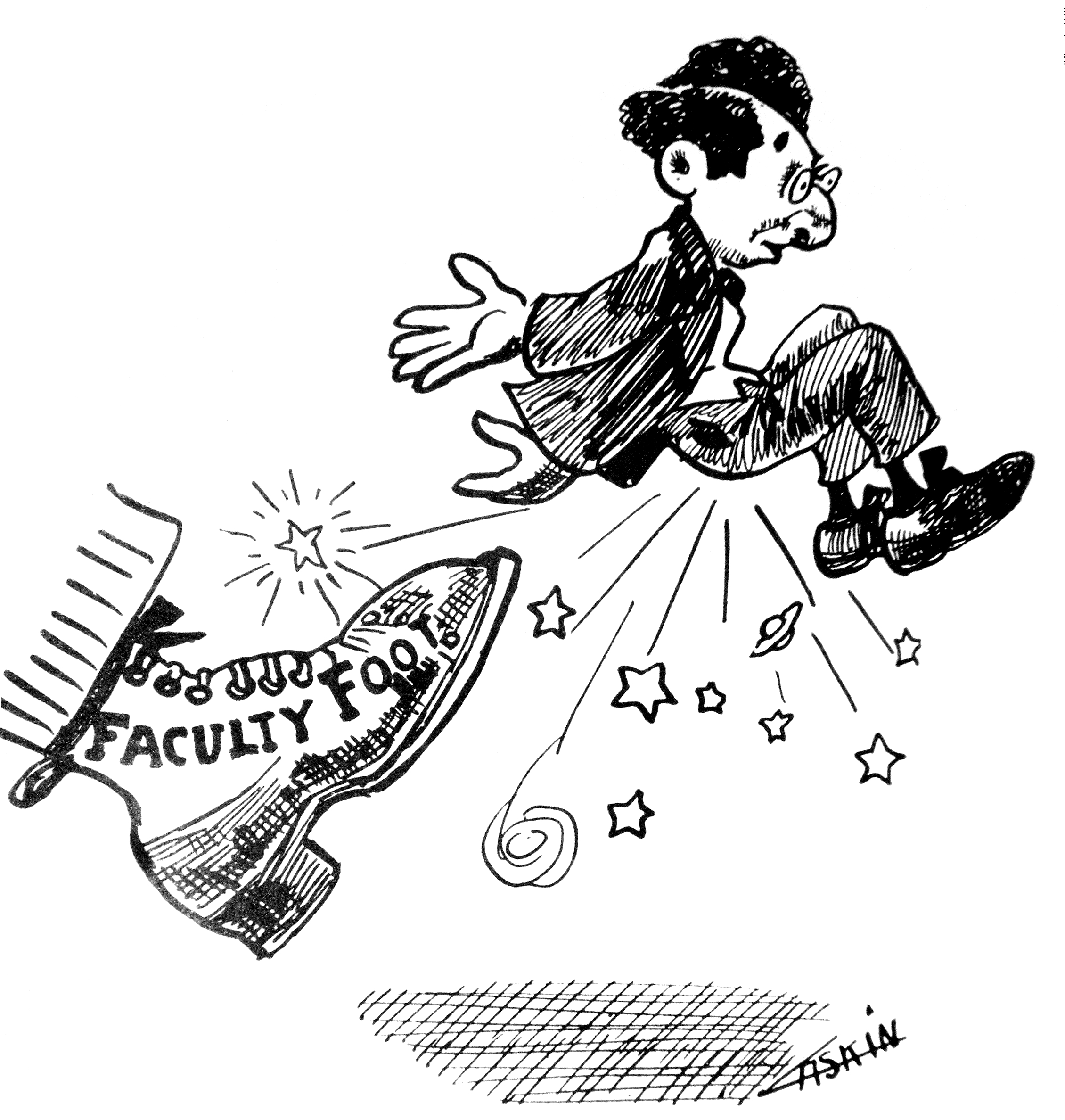
An early 20th-century illustration of a university faculty member being "given the boot", slang for a form of involuntary termination

Termination is an employee's departure from a job and the end of their time with an employer. Termination may be voluntary on the employee's part (resignation), or it may be at the hands of the employer, often in the form of dismissal (firing or sacking) or a layoff. Dismissal or firing is usually thought to be the employee's fault, whereas a layoff is generally done for business reasons (for instance, a business slowdown or an economic downturn) outside the employee's performance.

Firing carries a stigma in many cultures and may hinder the jobseeker's chances of finding new employment, particularly if they have been terminated from a previous job. Jobseekers sometimes do not mention jobs from which they were fired on their resumes. Accordingly, unexplained gaps in employment, and refusal or failure to contact previous employers are often regarded as "red flags".

== Dismissal ==
Dismissal is when the employer chooses to require the employee to leave, usually for the reason that is the employee's fault. The most common colloquial terms for dismissal in the United States are "getting fired" or "getting canned" whereas in the United Kingdom the terms "getting the sack" or "getting sacked" are also used.

== Layoff ==
A less severe form of involuntary termination is often referred to as a layoff (also redundancy or being made redundant in British English). A layoff is usually not strictly related to personal performance but instead due to economic cycles or the company's need to restructure itself, the firm itself going out of business, or a change in the function of the employer (for example, a certain type of product or service is no longer offered by the company, and therefore jobs related to that product or service are no longer needed). One type of layoff is the aggressive layoff; in such a situation, the employee is laid off but not replaced as the job is eliminated.

In an economy based on at-will employment, such as that of the United States, a large proportion of workers may be laid off at some time in their life, and often for reasons unrelated to performance or ethics. Employment termination can also result from a probational period, in which both the employee and the employer agree that the employer is allowed to lay off the employee if the probational period is not satisfied.

Often, layoffs occur as a result of "downsizing", "reduction in force" or "redundancy". These are not technically classified as firings; laid-off employees' positions are terminated and not refilled because either the company wishes to reduce its size or operations or lacks the economic stability to retain the position. In some cases, a laid-off employee may eventually be offered their old position again by their respective company, though by this time, they may have found a new job.

Some companies resort to attrition (voluntary redundancy) as a means to reduce their workforce. Under such a plan, no employees are forced to leave their jobs. However, those who do depart voluntarily are not replaced. Additionally, employees may resign in exchange for a fixed amount of money, frequently a few years of their salary. Such plans have been carried out by the United States Federal Government under President Bill Clinton during the 1990s, and by the Ford Motor Company in 2005.

However, "layoff" may be specifically addressed and defined differently in the contract articles in the case of unionised work.

== Terminating Employees for Economic - Related Reasons ==
Key policy issues associated with terminating employees for economic-related reasons across 190 countries from World Bank Doing Business Data in the 2013-2017 period. (Most countries allow the termination of workers for economic reasons, but out of 190 countries, only Bolivia, Venezuela, Tonga, and Oman do not.)

=== Procedural requirements ===
ILO Termination of Employment Convention No. 158 requires if employers contemplate terminating a contract for economic reasons, they must promptly provide the employee representative with relevant information (termination reasons; number and types of employees may be affected; expected termination period)

In 93/186 countries (50%), employers must inform a third party before ending a contract with one worker. The third-party differs in each country, such as the Ministry of Labor and Social Affairs (Afghanistan; Bahrain); the Chief Labor Administrator (Bhutan); the Labor Inspectorate (Chile); the recognized trade union or if it does not exist, employers notify Chief Labor Officer (Guyana); a labor officer and union (Kenya); the union representative and the public regional representative for employment (Morocco).

In 32/186 countries (17%), approval of termination from a third party is compulsory. For instance, approval from the Industrial Relations Dispute Settlement Board (Indonesia), the Conciliation and Arbitration Labor Board (Mexico), the Commissioner of Labor (Sri Lanka), and the Ministry of Labor (Suriname); only approval from the Works Council in case exceptional protected employee or Integration Office if disabled one or Labor Inspectorate if one on maternity/parental leave (Germany); the General Labor Inspectorate or, in adding the labor ministry in case of collective dismissals (Angola).

Reforms of notification and approval procedures happened in five countries to make them more rigid:

	Third-party notification if one worker is dismissed?	Third- party approval if one worker is dismissed?	Third-party notification if nine workers are dismissed?	Third- party approval if nine workers are dismissed?	Third-party notification if one worker is dismissed?	Third- party approval if one worker is dismissed?	Third-party notification if nine workers are dismissed?	Third- party approval if nine workers are dismissed?
	2017				2013			
Azerbaijan	Yes	No	Yes	No	No	No	No	No
Barbados	No	No	Yes	No	No	No	No	No
Kiribati	Yes	No	Yes	No	Yes	Yes	Yes	Yes
Morocco	Yes	Yes	Yes	Yes	No	No	Yes	Yes
Singapore	No	No	Yes	No	No	No	No	No

=== Retraining and/or reassignment obligation ===
The ILO Recommendation No. 166 emphasizes employers’ obligation to retrain or reassign their workforce before terminating a redundant worker, and this provision is specified in labor law of many high income countries like Finland, France, Germany, Greece, Italy, Portugal, and Sweden; in case law of Netherlands; under the Fair Work Act 2009 (Australia); not obligation but employers in the United Kingdom do have to consider suitable alternative employment; in many developing countries and emerging market economies (ex. Kazakhstan; Pakistan; Sierra Leone; Vietnam).

=== Priority rules ===
According to ILO Recommendation No. 166, employers who select employees being terminated must comply with the criteria and order of priority specifically established in national laws or collective agreements.

For example, the groups are not layoff: “pregnant employees, female employees on maternity leave, male or female employees on maternity leave, single male or female employees taking care of their children under three years old or staff personally caring for relatives with severe disabilities; employees on leave, including annual leave, maternity leave, parental leave, sick leave, unpaid leave or other leave, or in other cases of absence for legitimate reasons. Elected union officials are also a traditionally protected group; their dismissal normally requires the consent of the higher union authority”.

in Botswana, Gambia, Kenya, Malta, Mexico, Nigeria, Panama, and Sierra Leone, employees with less seniority will be terminated first.

ILO Recommendation No. 166 ^{2} prioritizes rehiring workers being terminated for economic reasons. In 2017, labour law imposed reemployment obligations in 69/186 countries (37), covering 31% of high-income and 63% of low-income countries. Priority provisions for rehiring dismissed employees are usually valid for 6 months (in Croatia, Gambia, the Netherlands, Serbia, Togo, and Turkey) to 12 months (in Cyprus with eight months; Djibouti, Lebanon, FYR Macedonia, and Peru within one year). Korea provides the lengthiest period of three years.

Reforms: between 2013 and 2017, 13 countries reformed rules of retraining, reassignment and priority. Most countries have liberalized some rules.

	Retraining or reassignment obligation before redundancy	Priority rules for redundancies	Priority rules for reemployment	Retraining or reassignment obligation before redundancy	Priority rules for redundancies	Priority rules for reemployment
	2017			2013		
The Bahamas	No	No	Yes	No	No	No
Bahrain	No	Yes	No	No	No	No
Cabo Verde	No	Yes	No	Yes	Yes	Yes
Croatia	No	Yes	Yes	Yes	Yes	Yes
Dominica	No	No	Yes	No	Yes	No
Kazakhstan	No	No	No	Yes	No	No
Mauritius	No	Yes	No	No	No	No
Montenegro	Yes	No	No	Yes	Yes	Yes
Pakistan	No	Yes	Yes	Yes	Yes	Yes
Portugal	Yes	No	No	Yes	Yes	Yes
Romania	No	Yes	Yes	Yes	Yes	Yes
Sri Lanka	No	No	No	No	Yes	No
Trinidad and Tobago	No	No	No	No	Yes	No

=== Notice period ===
Advance notice of future layoffs facilitates workers' job search. There are many existing versions of the regulation of notice periods worldwide.

In 2017, 73 countries had a conditional length of notice period; 89 countries had a fixed period without regard to job tenure; 25 countries did not have like in Denmark, Greece, New Zealand, Uruguay, Guinea-Bissau, El Salvador, Guatemala, Indonesia, Mexico, Peru, and Serbia).

The most generous notice period is in Sweden (33 weeks), the Gambia and Luxembourg (26 weeks) for an employee with at least ten years of tenure.

Some countries set minimum job tenure for an employee to receive the notice (e.g. in Greece and Lesotho: there is no notice for novices in their first 12-month trial period; In Ireland, two week notice period for employees working 104 weeks continuously.

Some countries differentiate the notice period based on professional criteria (ex. In Lao PDR 30 days for manual workers, 45 days for skilled workers; In Austria, two weeks for blue-collar workers, white-collar workers have different notice periods depending on their different tenure; the same in Madagascar, the notice period varies for laborers as it also depends on the length of employment and occupational group.

Some countries use social criteria to establish the advance notice period. For example, in Lithuania, two months is typical, but four months for an employee under 18 years old/ disabled/has full pension in less than five years/ raising children under 14 years old. In Croatia, the two-week notice is applied if the worker is over 50 years old, and one month for 55 years old.

As suggested by The ILO Termination of Employment Recommendation No. 166, an employee should be provided some days off to seek a new job during their notice period but still benefit from paid leave of absence. Poland is an example, and a worker has two or three days absent from work to find another job.

== Unfair Termination of Employment ==
=== General overview ===
Unfair termination of employment refers to the dismissal of an employee without a valid legal reason, usually not applicable in cases of redundancy, incompetence, or misconduct. According to Michael Salamon, author of Industrial Relations: Theory and Practice (2000), employers hold the legal authority to enforce workplace rules and expect employees to follow societal and job-related norms, avoiding from misconduct. However, some workplaces unjustly apply these rules, leading to excessive legal control over employees.

=== The Law of Unfair Termination ===
There is not a single worldwide legal framework that governs unfair termination across all countries. Employment laws, including those related to unfair termination, vary significantly from one country to another. Each country has its legal framework and regulations concerning employment relationships, which may include provisions about dismissal and termination.

For example, The Employment Rights Act 1996 (ERA 1996) is the United Kingdom (UK) employment legislation that governs the rights and responsibilities of employers and employees in the context of employment relationships within the UK. The ERA 1996 outlines various aspects of employment law, including unfair termination, redundancy, employment contracts, and minimum notice periods, among other matters. These regulations and protections apply to individuals working in the UK or to UK-based employers.

However, international labor standards and guidelines are set forth by organizations such as ILO, known as "ILO Convention No. 158 - Termination of Employment Convention, 1982." These international standards provide overarching principles and recommendations for labor rights and practices but do not constitute binding laws for individual countries.

=== The example of unfair termination: Tanzania ===
In Tanzania, around 700 ex-mineworkers from the Bulyanhulu underground gold mining site won an unfair dismissal case in July 2010. They were terminated because of participating in a strike in 2007 following failed wage negotiations. The mine temporarily halted production and fired 1,300 striking employees, claiming they had left illegally. Some were rehired, while others sought legal assistance.

Another example of unfair termination in Tanzania involved the Sun Flag Textile Factory. The company employs 2,100 workers who work 24/7. In February 2008, around 350 workers were unfairly terminated for protesting lower wages from the factory, against government recommendations. Subsequently, about a hundred workers were reemployed at different production sites.

== Terminating in a safe, legal, and humane manner ==
An inadequately handled termination of employment can lead to legal conflicts or accusations of wrongful termination. Examples of wrongful termination include an employer firing an employee for filing or pursuing a workers' compensation claim after a workplace injury, discriminatory termination based upon membership within a protected class, or terminating workers for refusing to commit illegal acts. Some experts suggest organizations should have a well-defined termination policy and a direct and brief termination meeting to minimize undesired outcomes, such as departing employees displaying aggression and causing disturbances within workgroups. Most employees anticipate receiving the reason for their termination, although it is usually not mandated by law. Therefore, managers must communicate the rationale of the termination to the employee without repeating prior issues, using clichés, or trying to present termination in a favorable light that can offend.

There are four effective and efficient steps for terminating employee in a safe, legal, and humane manner:

1. Pre-termination decision-making:
  - Document the reasons for termination promptly: Create a memo or report detailing the decision rationale and attaching relevant documents like performance reviews, witness statements, and disciplinary notices. This record is not shared with the employee but ensures a credible, comprehensive, and immediate account of the termination's grounds for potential legal use.
  - Investigate before terminating: Employers should diligently investigate potential job separations. Engage with all parties involved impartially and document their accounts
  - Consider alternatives (e.g., performance improvement plans, gradual disciplinary measures, final chance arrangements, voluntary resignations).
  - Subject the decision to scrutiny by higher-level management and/or HR professionals.
  - Contemplate the possibility of extending a severance package in return for a release of liability.
2. Preparing the termination meeting or exit interview:
  - Schedule the meeting: While there is some debate in the literature, many experts recommend scheduling terminations for early in the day and early in the week.
  - Coordinate with the IT department to deactivate network access at the time of the termination.
  - Prepare a meeting place by booking a room that private and separated from other employees.
3. Conducting the meeting:
  - Keep the meeting duration in 15 minutes or less.
  - Using clear and straightforward language, such as "We have decided to terminate your employment, and today will be your final day" Is recommended. Formulating the statement in the past tense helps to prevent disputes, negotiations, or requests for reconsideration.
  - Articulate the termination reason in concise and using general terms, refraining from delving into specifics or revisiting past issues that could lead in potential termination-related disputes.
  - Avoid debate: If the employee did not accept the reason of termination, it is advisable to decline further discussion during the meeting to avoid debate but offer solution by scheduling other discussion.
  - Demonstrate comfort with emotional expressions but avoid excessive responses and using clichés.
4. Finalizing the process:
  - Offer a concise explanation of post-termination compensation and available services (e.g., continued benefits, severance pay, job placement assistance).
  - Retrieve company assets (e.g., keys, laptops, corporate credit cards) from the departing employee.
  - Maintain discretion regarding the specifics of the termination meeting.

== Termination by mutual agreement ==
Some terminations result from a mutual agreement between the employer and the employee. When this happens, it is sometimes debatable if the termination was indeed mutual. In many of these cases, it was initially the employer's wish for the employee to depart, but the employer offered the mutual termination agreement to soften the firing (as in a forced resignation). But there are also times when a termination date is agreed upon before the employment starts (as in an employment contract).

Some types of termination by the mutual agreement include:

- The end of an employment contract for a specified period (such as an internship)
- Mandatory retirement. Some occupations, such as commercial airline pilots, face mandatory retirement at a certain age.
- Forced resignation

=== Changes of conditions ===
Firms that wish for an employee to exit of their own accord but do not wish to pursue firing or forced resignation may degrade the employee's working conditions, hoping that they will leave "voluntarily".

The employee may be moved to a different geographical location, assigned to an undesirable shift, given too few hours if part-time, demoted (or relegated to a menial task), or assigned to work in uncomfortable conditions. Other forms of manipulation may be used, such as being unfairly hostile to the employee and punishing them for things other employees deliberately overlook.

Often, these tactics are done so the employer will not have to fill out termination papers in jurisdictions without at-will employment. In addition, with a few exceptions, employees who voluntarily leave generally cannot collect unemployment benefits.

Such tactics may amount to constructive dismissal, which is illegal in some jurisdictions.

== Pink slip ==
Pink slip refers to the American practice, by a human resources department, of including a discharge notice in an employee's pay envelope to notify the worker of their involuntary termination of employment or layoff.

The "pink slip" has become a metonym for the termination of employment in general. According to an article in The New York Times, the editors of the Random House Dictionary have dated the term to at least as early as 1910.

The phrase may have originated in vaudeville. When the United Booking Office (established in 1906) would issue a cancellation notice to an act, the notice was on a pink slip. Another possible etymology is that many applications (including termination papers) are done in triplicate form, with each copy on a different color of paper, one of which is typically pink.

In the UK and, until 1 January 2019 in Ireland, the equivalent of a pink slip is a P45; in Belgium the equivalent is known as a C4.

== Rehire following termination ==
In certain situations, an individual who has been terminated or left from their job may have the opportunity to be reemployed by the same employer. In some cases, when an employee departs on good terms, such as pursuing a specific career goal, going to graduate school or pregnancy, they might be given special priority by the employer when seeking to rehire. Conversely, an employer is not likely to rehire a former employee who was terminated for cause, for example as a result of workplace violation, discriminatory, misconduct, insubordination, and ethics violations.

"Boomerang" is the term for workers who depart from an organization but are subsequently rehired by the same organization. Reemployment could be a good option because boomerangs tend to have longer tenure and lower absenteeism rates than other recruitment sources. Breaugh (2008) added that rehiring former employees, categorized as "targeted recruitment", usually produces candidates with a higher likelihood of receiving and accepting job offers, better job performance, and longer organizational retention compared to candidates from "untargeted recruitment". In terms of loyalty, boomerangs may have better loyalty as they voluntarily choose to return, having experience with their former and subsequent employers and making an informed decision to return.

There are three main types of employee rehiring; rehiring retirees, rehiring female employees who left voluntarily due to having children or caring for other family members, and rehiring as a natural outcome of the evolving concept of multi-faceted careers.

A notable example of a successful "rehire following termination" is Steve Jobs, a co-founded Apple Computers Inc. He initially left the company after being removed as CEO, spending eleven years building successful ventures outside of Apple. He returned to Apple in 1996 when the company was facing financial challenges. His comeback is considered one of the top ten most successful corporate turnarounds, leading to the introduction of innovative products and profitability.

== Final pay after Termination - Practices in New Zealand ==
=== 1. Definition ===
Final pay, which is also refers to termination pay, is a financial package provided by employers to employees when their employment is terminated under specific circumstances.

=== 2. When to pay ===
If an employee terminates on notice, their final pay should be given on the agree-upon pay day mentioned in their employment contract. If there is no agreed date, the final pay should be available after the last working day.

If the employer and employee mutually decide to end the employment immediately with a payment in lieu notice, they can set a different date for the final pay. However, it is advisable for this payment to align with the actual last day of employment.

If an employee does not receive all the components of their final pay which are owing, they may have a claim for unpaid wages or holiday pay or other breach of their employment agreement.

=== 3. Purpose of Final pay ===
In general, final pay package is typical meant to pay employees for any remaining wages and benefits happen since the last pay day to their last working day. It serves to provide financial support to employees during the transition period, ensure compliance with legal requirements, and in some cases, protect both parties from potential legal disputes.

=== 4. Components of Final pay ===
Final pay packages usually come in a lump sum and consist of various components based on company policies and employment agreements, but typically must include:

4.1 Wages and salary for all the hours worked since the last pay until the last working day of employment.

4.2 Any leave entitlements owed to employee, including:

- Unused annual holidays, which is calculated at the rate of the greater of whichever is higher: the regular weekly pays or average weekly earnings. Additionally, the employee is also entitled to receive 8% of their total earnings since their last anniversary date for annual holidays (which may include payments for annual holidays, public holidays, and alternative holidays).
- Public holidays (when applicable). Public holidays will be paid if it falls within the duration created by adding their remaining annual holidays to the end of their employment and occurs on a day that aligns with their regular work schedule if they were still employed, and that day was not public holiday. If the employee qualifies for payment on a public holiday, then the duration covered by annual holidays is prolonged by one day for each eligible public holiday. This extended period may include additional public holidays that should also be considered for compensation.
- Accrued but unused alternative holidays of their prior work on public holidays. Alternative holidays do not affect the termination date and are not treated as calculation pay for public holidays as aforementioned.

4.3 Non-reimbursed expenses or allowance from employee’s work travel or working overtime before end of employment.

4.4 Any deductions or forfeiture related to financial loss or damage that employer had to suffer due to employee’s failure to fulfill their duty. Deductions or forfeiture from employee’s final pay require written consent or a specific clause in the employment agreement. Employers should notice employee beforehand about any deductions or forfeiture if applicable.

4.5 Any other allowances, bonuses that stated in the employment agreement.

Final pay package may or may not include:

4.6 Sick leave and bereavement leave: There is no legal requirement to provide payment for unused sick or bereavement leave when an employee leaves their job. It is on hand of employer to pay entirety, a portion or not to pay.

4.7 Severance pay: is a special allowance/bonus, which is offered to terminated employees in special contexts, such as redundancy, downsizing, or lay off. Severance pay is not mandatory; however, employers usually offer severance package as a gesture of goodwill and competitive advantage. Severance pay is paid, if any, based on employee’s years of service and contribution to the company. It may also include continuation of benefits and other perks (health insurance, outplacement assistant, etc.).

The primary purpose of severance pay is to provide financial support to employees during the transition period following their termination. It helps employees bridge the gap until they secure new employment and helps employers comply with employment laws and regulations and to mitigate potential legal disputes and claims.

In some special situations, employers and employees may decide to end the employment relationship through mutual agreement as a best solution to resolve their differences. In this case, severance pay is understood as an exchange for the employee giving up the right to take legal actions against the employer. This financial settlement is referred to as “exit packages” or “golden handshakes” and is legalized in a “record of settlement” signed by both parties and endorsed by a mediator. It helps ensuring a smooth transition while protecting the interests of both parties.

Death is also considered as a special type of termination and should be also entitled to severance package. It is provided to family or beneficiaries of employee who died while employed to help them overcome the difficult time of losing the breadwinner.

== See also ==
- Employee offboarding
- Labour law
- Letter of resignation
- Termination of Employment Convention, 1982
- Turnover (employment)
- Wrongful termination
