= Pay-as-you-earn tax =

Income tax system

A pay-as-you-earn tax (PAYE), or pay-as-you-go (PAYG) is a withholding of taxes on income payments to employees. Amounts withheld are treated as advance payments of income tax due. They are refundable to the extent they exceed tax as determined on tax returns. PAYE may include withholding the employee portion of insurance contributions or similar social benefit taxes. In most countries, they are determined by employers but subject to government review. PAYE is deducted from each paycheck by the employer and must be remitted promptly to the government. Most countries refer to income tax withholding by other terms, including pay-as-you-go tax.

== United Kingdom ==
=== Origins ===
Devised by Sir Paul Chambers, PAYE was introduced into the UK in 1944, following trials in 1940–1941. As with many of the United Kingdom's institutional arrangements, the way in which the state collects income tax through PAYE owes much of its form and structure to the peculiarities of the era in which it was devised. The financial strain that the Second World War placed upon the country meant that the Treasury needed to collect more tax from many more people. This posed significant challenges to the government and to the many workers and employers who had previously never come into contact with the tax system.

=== Nature ===
PAYE is applied to wages and salaries, as well as sick pay, maternity pay, directors' fees and pensions (but not the state pension, although it remains taxable). Each person has a tax code which is used to reflect any allowances, along with other taxable income (including the state pension). This means that the PAYE system typically results in the correct amount of tax being paid on all the taxable income of a taxpayer, making a tax return unnecessary. However, if the taxpayer's affairs are complicated, a tax return may be required to determine the amount of tax payable or refundable.

=== Reporting ===
The employer is responsible for sending the Income Tax on to HMRC each month, along with various other employment taxes. The amounts deducted from each payment to individual employees must be reported using an electronic submission on or before the day payment is made.

== Ireland ==
PAYE in Ireland includes deduction of income tax and PRSI (Pay Related Social Insurance) by employers from payments to employees. The amount is determined by employers based on a Certificate of Tax Credits and Standard Rate (Certificate) provided by Ireland Revenue (Revenue).

PAYE applies to earnings of all kinds arising from your employment, including bonuses, overtime and non-cash payments known as "benefits in kind" such as the use of a company car.

=== Forms and reporting ===
Employees must apply to Revenue for the certificate by submitting Form 12A to Revenue. A certificate is issued at the beginning of each tax year based on the employee's personal circumstances. At the end of each tax year, the employer must give the employee a certificate of Pay, Tax and PRSI deducted during the year, Form P60.

A Form P45 is a certificate given by an employer to an employee on cessation of employment. This form certifies the employee's pay, tax and PRSI contributions from the start of the tax year to date of cessation and also certifies that the deductions have been made in accordance with the instructions given by Revenue.

If the PAYE is not the same as tax that would be due for the year, the employee must file Form 12, an annual tax return.

== New Zealand ==
PAYE is deducted by employers from employees' salary or wages in New Zealand, and paid to the Inland Revenue Department (IRD) on their behalf. It includes income tax and ACC earners' levy. PAYE is calculated by employers based on tax codes provided by the employee and tables provided by the IRD. Employees may calculate their expected tax and tax code using the PAYE calculator.

=== Forms and reporting ===
Employees must provide their employer with a completed IR330 Tax code declaration form, advising their employer of their IRD number (which is one's identification number with the IRD) and the appropriate tax code for which to deduct in tax, and if required, student loan repayments. If an employer does not receive a correctly completed IR330, the employer may deduct tax at the "no-notification rate" of 45%.

Employers use either the IR340 (weekly/fortnightly) or IR341 (four-weekly/monthly) PAYE deduction tables to determine the appropriate amounts to deduct from an employee's wages. Every month, an employer must file a complete Employer monthly schedule with the IRD, stating the income and deductions of each employee. Tax withheld must be paid to the IRD monthly or semi-monthly, accompanied (or sent separately in the case of electronic payment) with a completed IR345 Employer deductions form.

== Australia ==
The Australian Taxation Office (ATO) administers a pay-as-you-go tax (PAYG) withholding system. Introduced in 1999, it merged 11 previous payment and reporting systems, one of which was a "PAYE" system for employee income, from which the name "PAYG" distinguishes. Employers must calculate the amount of income tax to withhold based on ATO tables, based on employee declarations. These arrangements cover payments from employment as well as under the Prescribed Payments system and the Reportable Payments system. The PAYG system involves regular payments made by employers and other payers, for example, superannuation funds. It is used to collect by instalments income tax, HELP repayments, Medicare and other payments. PAYG amounts to be withheld are determined based on the Australian Taxation Office (ATO) PAYG schedules. Discrepancies and deduction amounts are declared in the annual income tax return and will be part of the refund that follows after annual assessment or reduce the tax debt that may be payable after assessment.

For an employee's primary job, the withholding tax rate is lower because of the existence of a tax-free threshold in Australia. All other work has tax withheld based on a rate that excludes the tax-free threshold.

=== PAYG summaries ===
Each employee who receives PAYG-type payments during a financial year would receive a PAYG payment summary from their employer at the end of the financial year - commonly known as the Group Certificate. The PAYG payment summary will include:

- the employee's details including the Tax File Number (TFN)
- the gross income earned by the employee from that payer
- the total PAYG amount withheld by the payer
- the payer's Australian Business Number or withholding payer number (WPN).

The information on the PAYG payment summary is needed to enable the employee to complete his or her income tax return.

The payer must send to the ATO a copy of the PAYG payment summaries as well as an annual PAYG summary. This may be sent to the ATO electronically using Standard Business Reporting enabled software, or it may be sent as a hard copy by mail. The total of the wages paid reported on the PAYG summary and the total amount withheld must agree with the totals as reported by the payer to the ATO on the Business Activity Statements (BASs) for the year. The ATO will use the information on the PAYG payment summary to match with the employee, using the employee's TFN.

== Barbados ==
The PAYE tax system was introduced in Barbados in 1957 which allowed employees to have their income tax be paid on the behalf of their employers by deducting the amount from their wage/salary. Every employer who has employees earning more than $481 per week or $2,083 per month is required to register as an employer with the Barbados Revenue Authority (BRA) in either 12 month or 52 weekly installments.

=== Forms and reporting ===
PAYE can be calculated via a provided PAYE Tax Calculator form on the BRA website. Employers must receive the employees' 13 digit Tax Identification Number (TIN) and register them via a provided A47: 001 Employee Declaration Form along with a A47.004 PAYE Tax Deduction Remittance Form where after they must pay the employees' taxes to the Revenue Commissioner on or before the 15th of the month following the month in which it was deducted. There is also a provided Tax Tables Booklet that assists employers with instructions on how to correctly calculate and pay an employee's income tax.

== Similar systems ==
Several other countries operate systems similar to PAYE that may be referred to as withholding tax or deduction of tax at source. See the articles listed below.

=== Canada ===
Canada requires tax deduction at source on payments of compensation by employers. The deduction is required for federal and provincial income taxes, Canada Pension Plan contributions, and Employment Insurance.

=== France ===
Initially set to start in 2018, France introduced a pay-as-you-earn scheme for the collection of its state income tax (impôt sur le revenu) in January 2019. To accommodate the progressivity of the French tax system, which considers the total income and composition of the household to set the tax rate of individuals, while preserving the privacy of employees to their employers, the administration only transmits to companies the individual tax rate to retain on their employees' paychecks, along with other payroll withholding, such as social security contributions.

=== Morocco ===
Employers are required to withhold income tax on salary paid to employees. The tax must be paid to the government during the month following the withholding.

=== Germany ===
In Germany employers are required to pay salary tax (Lohnsteuer) for their employees which is an advance payment on the income tax. The employer is liable for the salary tax, but the employee has to pay it. In most situations it is not mandatory to file taxes as the salary tax can cover the whole income tax. Unemployment aid, short time work aid or other sources of income like a business or a rental object require people in Germany to file taxes.

=== United States ===
Withholding of income, Social Security and Medicare taxes is required in the United States. The plan was developed by Beardsley Ruml, Bernard Baruch, and Milton Friedman in 1942. The government forgave taxes due March 15, 1942, for tax year 1941, and started withholding from paychecks. Income tax withholding applies to federal and state income taxes. In addition, certain states impose other levies required to be withheld.

In the United States, the term "pay-as-you-earn" and PAYE typically refer to income-based repayment of loans, not taxation. However, an IRS article published March 29, 2022, updates and reviews the policy as pay-as-you-go, or else you may be penalized for not paying estimated taxes if you owe more than $1,000 after taxes are withheld.
