= Bammert v. Don's Super Valu, Inc. =

Bammert v. Don's SuperValu, Inc.
- Court: Wisconsin Supreme Court
- Full case name: Karen R. Bammert, Plaintiff-Appellant-Petitioner, v. Don's SuperValu, Inc., Defendant-Respondent.
- Decided: July 3, 2002
- Citation: 646 N.W.2d 365; 2002 WI 85; 254 Wis.2d 347

Case history
- Prior actions: Plaintiff filed claim with Equal Rights Division of Department of Workforce Development (dismissed); appealed to Labor and Industry Review commission (upheld)
- Appealed from: Wisconsin Court of Appeals (606 N.W.2d 620, 1999)

Court membership
- Judges sitting: Shirley S. Abrahamson, William A. Bablitch, John P. Wilcox, Ann Walsh Bradley, N. Patrick Crooks, David T. Prosser, Diane S. Sykes

Case opinions
- Majority: Sykes
- Dissent: Bablitch, joined by Abrahamson, Bradley

Keywords
- At-will employment; Retaliatory termination

In Bammert v. Don's Super Valu, Inc., 646 N.W.2d 365 (Wis. 2002), the Wisconsin Supreme Court was faced with "a single question of first-impression: can the public policy exception to the employment-at-will doctrine be invoked when an at-will employee is fired in retaliation for the actions of his or her non-employee spouse?" The court answered this question in the negative.

The judge in the case was Diane S. Sykes.

== Background ==
=== Facts ===
Karen Bammert worked as an assistant manager at Don's Super Valu in Menomonie, Wisconsin for 26 years.

On June 7, 1997, her husband, a police officer, assisted in the arrest of Don Williams' wife on a drunk driving charge.

On August 28, 1997, Mrs. Bammert was fired.

=== Complaint ===
The employee sued for wrongful discharge, alleging that the dismissal was retaliatory and invoking the public policy exception to the employment-at-will doctrine.

=== Dismissal ===
The employer filed a motion to dismiss, and the Circuit Court of Dunn County, Wisconsin dismissed the complaint for failure to state a claim, concluding that the employment-at-will doctrine's public policy exception, announced by the Wisconsin Supreme Court in Brockmeyer v. Dun & Bradstreet (Wis. 1983), did not apply. The Wisconsin Court of Appeals affirmed the dismissal upon appeal.

== Appeal to State Supreme Court ==
The employee filed a petition for review, which the supreme court accepted.

== Opinion of the court ==
The state supreme court held that the public policy exception to the employment-at-will doctrine could not be invoked when an at-will employee was fired in retaliation for the actions of his or her non-employee spouse. The case was properly dismissed for failure to state a claim.

=== Reasoning ===
Wisconsin's public-policy exception to the employment-at-will doctrine is narrow. First, the court reiterated the state's public policy exception to the employment at will doctrine : ordinarily, an employer may discharge an at-will employee " 'for good cause, for no cause, or even for cause morally wrong, without being thereby guilty of wrongdoing"; however, a suit for wrongful discharge is available "when the discharge is contrary to a fundamental and well-defined public policy as evidenced by existing law." It also reiterated the Brockmeyer court's characterization of the narrowness of this exception: public policy did not entail a "broad implied duty of good faith [termination]", since such a duty "would unduly restrict an employer's discretion in managing the work force" and " 'subject each discharge to judicial incursions into the amorphous concept of bad faith.' " Rather, the public policy exception is 'narrow," i.e. applicable only where the discharge "clearly contravenes the public welfare and gravely violates paramount requirements of public interest." And since the action is predicated on "the breach of an implied provision that an employer will not discharge an employee for refusing to perform an act that violates a clear mandate of public policy," in sounds in contract not tort.

Out of concern to avoid vagueness in application of the term "public policy" in evaluating discharge claims, the court explained that:

- "Courts should proceed cautiously when making public policy determinations. No employer should be subject to suit merely because a discharged employee's conduct was praiseworthy or because the public may have derived some benefit from it." (quoting Brockmeyer)
- "Employers will be held liable for those terminations that effectuate an unlawful end," as "evidenced by a constitutional or statutory provision". ("To say that the employer could be prosecuted for criminal involvement as a result of the activities would be little solace for the discharged employee.") (quoting Brockmeyer)
  - The Bammert court wrote: "a plaintiff must identify a constitutional, statutory, or administrative provision that clearly articulates a fundamental and well-defined public policy", i.e. justify that the public policy is "sufficiently fundamental and well-defined" by reference to the content of the provision. To shift the burden to the employer to show just cause for the termination, the plaintiff must identify a public policy sufficient to trigger the exception, and demonstrate that the termination violated that public policy.

Discharges for others' actions not actionable. According to the court, Bammert adduced two public policies through two statutes:

- the statutory prohibition on drunk driving, implicating a public policy which requires the "diligent pursuit and punishment of drunk drivers"
- the preamble to the Family Code, which describes its goals to include "the preservation of the family society, the state, morality, and indeed, all civilization"; which requires "the vigorous promotion of the institution of marriage".

However, noting that "Discharges for conduct outside of the employment relationship by someone other than the discharged employee are not actionable under present law," the Court did not find these grounds sufficient to "enlarge" the public-policy exception, to apply in an instance where Bammert "was not fired for her participation" but "for her husband's participation in the enforcement of" the drunk driving laws.

No actions to vindicate others' public policy interests. Furthermore, "when the exception has been applied, the public policy at issue has always been vindicated by the employee himself or herself, within the context of the employment relationship. In contrast, Bammert's claim identifies a public policy completely unrelated to her employment, being enforced by someone else, who is employed elsewhere. That the "someone else" is her husband makes her discharge obviously retaliatory, and reminds us of the sometimes harsh reality of employment-at-will, but it does not provide acceptable grounds for expansion of the public policy exception beyond its present boundaries."

Line-drawing would be impossible to do in a principled way. "Public policy comes in many variations, is implicated in many contexts, and is carried out by many people, both publicly and privately. Once expanded in the manner argued here, the public policy exception would no longer be subject to any discernable limiting principles. It would arguably apply to retaliatory discharges based upon the conduct of any non-employee relative, for the fulfillment of or refusal to violate public policy in a wide variety of ways and in a manner completely unconnected to the employment relationship. The public policy exception cannot be stretched that far and still be recognizable under Brockmeyer's limited formulation."

== Dissent ==
Bammert was fired in retaliation for Bammert's husband's actions as a police officer. This is an unacceptable influence on how police officers do their jobs. Extending the at-will employment policy to police officers aligns with precedent and with the public interest for vigorous enforcement of the law free from undue influence.

== Pedagogical use ==
It is the first case in Employment Law: Cases and Materials, under Part I: Background / Chapter 1: Work and Law / Section B: Legal Intervention. Subsequent to the case there are seven notes.

- Note 1 explains "at will" employment, with reference to Horace Gray Wood, Law of Master and Servant § 134, at 273 (1877):

With us the rule is inflexible, that a general or indefinite hiring is prima facie a hiring at will, and if the servant seeks to make it out a yearly hiring, the burden is upon him to establish it by proof. ... [I]t is an indefinite hiring and is determinable at the will of either party.

- Note 3 invites the reader to distinguish Fortunato v. Office of Stephen M. Silston, D.D.S.
