= Severance package =

Pay and benefits an employee receives from their employer upon dismissal or layoff

A severance package is pay and benefits that employees may be entitled to receive when they leave employment at a company unwilfully. In addition to their remaining regular pay, it may include some of the following:

- Any additional payment based on months of service
- Payment for unused accrued PTO vacation time, holiday pay or sick leave unless the employee is picked up by the new buyer wherein all benefits become the responsibility of the new employer.
- COBRA insurance, or healthcare benefits through a certain period of time.
- A payment in lieu of a required notice period.
- Retirement accounts
- Stock options
- Commission payments
- Assistance in searching for new work, such as access to employment services or help in producing a résumé.

Packages are most typically offered for employees who are laid off or retire. Severance pay was instituted to help protect the newly unemployed. Sometimes, they may be offered for those who either resign, regardless of the circumstances, or are fired. Policies for severance packages are often found in a company's employee handbook. Severance contracts often stipulate that employees will not sue the employer for wrongful dismissal or attempt to collect on unemployment benefits, and that if they do so, they must return the severance money.

Larger severance packages were found to reduce labour market flexibility.

== United States ==
In the United States, there is no requirement in the Fair Labor Standards Act (FLSA) for severance pay. Instead it is a matter of agreement between employers and employees.

Severance agreements, among other things, could prevent an employee from working for a competitor and waive any right to pursue a legal claim against the former employer. Also, an employee may be giving up the right to seek unemployment compensation. An employment attorney may be contacted to assist in the evaluation and review of a severance agreement. The payments in some cases will continue only until the former employee has found another job. Employers sometimes offer a low severance package in hopes that employees will sign quickly without negotiating. Before agreeing to anything, the employee or their attorney can evaluate whether the severance pay is fair based on your role, length of employment, and the circumstances surrounding your termination.

Severance agreements cannot contain clauses that prevent employees from speaking to an attorney to get advice about whether they should accept the offer, or speak to an attorney after they sign. The offer also cannot require that the employee commit a crime, such as failing to appear subject to court subpoena for proceedings related to the company.

It can, however, prevent the filing of a lawsuit against the company for wrongful termination, discrimination, sexual harassment, etc.

Severance packages are often negotiable, and employees can hire a lawyer to review the package (typically for a fee), and potentially negotiate. However, employees are never entitled to any severance package upon termination or lay-offs.

Severance packages vary by country depending on government regulation. For instance, under the Age Discrimination in Employment Act (ADEA), employees over the age of forty (40) are entitled to 21 days to review and sign their severance offer. If an employer requires an employee over 40 to review and sign a severance offer in less than the compliant 21 days, they must allow employees more time to review.

In February 2010, a ruling in the Western District of Michigan held that severance pay is not subject to FICA taxes, but it was overturned by the Supreme Court in March 2014.

=== Puerto Rico ===
Employers are required to pay severance pay after an employee working in Puerto Rico is terminated. Employees are not permitted to waive this payment. Severance pay is not required if the employee was terminated with "just cause".

Just cause is satisfied in any of the following situations: the employee had a pattern of improper or disorderly conduct; the employee worked inefficiently, belatedly, negligently, poorly; the employee repeatedly violated the employer's reasonable and written rules; the employer had a full, temporary, or partial closing of operations; the employer had technological or reorganization changes, changes in the nature of the product made, and changes in services rendered; or the employer reduced the number of employees because of an actual or expected decrease in production, sales, or profits.

An employee with less than five years of employment with the employer must receive a severance payment equal to two months of salary, plus an additional one week of salary for each year of employment. An employee with more than five years but less than fifteen years of employment must receive a severance payment equal to three months of salary, plus an additional two weeks of salary for each year of employment. An employee with more than fifteen years of service must receive a severance payment equal to six months of salary, plus an additional three weeks of salary for each year of employment.

== Canada ==
The amount of severance pay an employee is owed when dismissed without misconduct varies between common law (judge-made law) and employment law.

=== Under employment law ===
In Ontario, the amount of severance pay under the employment law is given in Ontario by Employment Standards Act (ESA). The amount of severance pay under the employment law in Ontario may be calculated using the tool from Ontario Government.

No payment to terminated employees is required under certain circumstances, such as when the employee has been fired for wilful misconduct or other serious problems, if the job is temporary, if they work in construction or other specified industries, or if the worker was terminated during a strike or lockout. For most employees who lose their jobs through no fault of their own, the terms specified in the statute are the minimum requirements within the province, and they may be exceeded voluntarily, by contract requirements, or through common law rights.

=== Under common law ===
Common law provides above-minimal entitlements, using a well-recognized set of factors from Bardal v Globe and Mail Ltd. (the "Bardal Factors"). Bardal Factors include:

- the length of service of the servant,
- the age of the servant,
- the character of the employment (more senior, longer time needed to reach the similar seniority, job function)
- the availability of similar employment, having regard to the experience, training and qualifications of the servant (the likelihood of getting a similar job in the future).

There is a severance pay calculator based on common law "Bardal Factors" that predicts the amount of severance pay owed as determined by the court. The goal is to provide enough notice or pay in lieu for the employee to find comparable employment. Unlike statutory minimum notice, the courts will award much more than 8 weeks if warranted by the circumstances, with over 24 months' worth of pay in damages possible. Other factors considered may include:

- Inducement: If you were convinced to leave a previous job for one which quickly let you go, you may be able to get extra compensation, especially if your previous position was very stable and you were not looking for a new job.
- Bad faith: If you were fired in a particularly cruel manner, harassed or lied to by your employer, extra compensation may be required. Also see Wallace v United Grain Growers Ltd.
- Duty to mitigate: You must show that you are actively looking for another job.
- Wilful misconduct by the employee: This is more than simply not doing a good job, but involves being deliberately and recklessly negligent or disobedient.

The biggest factor in determining severance is re-employability. If someone is in a field or market where they will have great difficulty finding work, the court will provide more severance. The reason being that the primary purpose of severance is to provide the wrongfully dismissed employee the opportunity to secure other employment within the period provided. (See also Canada section in wrongful dismissal for related litigation cases in Canada.)

==== Dismissal with cause and termination without cause ====
In Canadian common law, there is a basic distinction as to dismissals. There are two basic types of dismissals, or terminations: dismissal with cause (just cause) and termination without cause. An example of cause would be an employee's behavior which constitutes a fundamental breach of the terms of the employment contract. Where cause exists, the employer can dismiss the employee without providing any notice. If no cause exists yet the employer dismisses without providing lawful notice, then the dismissal is a wrongful dismissal.

==== Litigation for wrongful dismissal ====
There is a time limit of two years from the date of termination for suing the employer in Ontario. This litigation follows civil procedure in Ontario. Before starting a court case, there are other options, such as, negotiation, mediation, and arbitration.

Typically in a civil lawsuit, in 2019, it can cost $1,500–$5,000 to initiate an action and have a lawyer deliver a Statement of Claim. Responding to the opposing side's documents and conducting examinations for discovery will likely involve another $3,500–$5,000. The preparation and presentation of your case at trial is likely to add another $5,000—$15,000 to your legal costs. These legal expenses are income tax deductible.

There are free Legal information and referral services offered on a confidential basis funded from government (The Access to Justice Fund) for all areas of law in major cities, such as, Ottawa Legal Information Centre.

== United Kingdom ==
In the United Kingdom Labour Law provides for Redundancy Pay. The maximum amount of statutory redundancy pay is £17,130.

== Italy ==
In Italy, severance pay (Trattamento di Fine Rapporto, TFR) is provided in all cases of termination of the employment relationship, for whatever reason: individual and collective dismissal, resignation, etc. The law recognizes subordinate workers the right to receive severance pay, pursuant to article 2120 of the civil code.

== The Netherlands ==
Dutch law provides that a "transition allowance" (transitievergoeding) is due to the employee within one month of the end of employment if the employment was terminated by the employer and not the employee, including if the employer chose to not renew a temporary work contract, save if the termination was due to a grave fault by the employee or if the employee reached the retirement age. The amount of compensation is normally equal to one third of one month's taxable compensation per year of employment, which includes a prorated amount equal to all the bonuses paid out in the preceding three years. This sum cannot exceed the greater of €94000 or one year's gross salary. This payment is subject to normal income taxes.

== Luxembourg ==
Severance pay in Luxembourg upon termination of a work contract becomes due after five years' service with a single employer, provided the employee is not entitled to an old-age pension and the termination is due to redundancy, unfair dismissal, or covered in a collective labor agreement. The statutory amount of pay depends on years of service and the notice provided of the pending termination, but all severance pay is generally exempt from income tax.

== China ==
=== Mainland China ===
The severance payment in Mainland China shall be based on the number of years the employee has worked for the employer at the rate of one month salary for each full year worked. Any period of no less than six months but less than one year shall be counted as one year. The severance payment payable to an employee for any period of less than six months shall be one half of his/her monthly salary.

If the monthly salary of an employee is higher than 3 times local average monthly salary where the employer is located, the rate for the severance payment to be paid shall be 3 times local average monthly salary and shall be for no more than 12 years.

Where any employee obtains lump-sum compensation income (including economic compensation, living allowances and other subsidies granted by an employer) from the employer's termination of labor relationship with him/her, the part of the income which is no more than three times the average wage amount of employees in the local area in the previous year shall be exempt from individual income tax.

The fraction of the compensation that exceeds 3 times the local annual average salary shall be taxed as individual income tax as follows: For those employees receiving a lump sum compensation, the lump sum can be considered as receiving monthly salaries in one time, and shall be allocated to a certain period in average amount. This average amount will be calculated dividing the lump sum by the service years with the current employer, and will be taxed as monthly salaries. For the number of service years with the current employer, the actual number of years should be considered. If the number of years is more than 12, only 12 will be considered.

=== Hong Kong ===
In Hong Kong, an employee employed under a continuous contract for not less than 24 months is eligible for severance payment if:

- he is dismissed by reason of redundancy;
- his fixed term employment contract expires without being renewed due to redundancy; or
- he is laid off

== Poland ==
In Poland severance is regulated in the Act on Collective Redundancies and may be due to the employee if:

- the employee is dismissed under the group redundancy procedure (collective dismissals), or
- dismissal is individual but made exclusively for reasons other than the employee's conduct and performance, provided the employer employs at least 20 employees.

Severance amounts to:

- 1-month salary for employees with seniority of less than 2 years (with given employer);
- 2-months salary for employees with seniority of 2 – 8 year (with given employer);
- 3-months salary for employees with seniority of more than 8 years (with given employer).

Maximum severance is limited with a 15 x statutory minimum salary.

== United Arab Emirates ==
Under Federal Decree-Law No. 33 of 2021, which regulates labour relations in the private sector, a full-time foreign worker covered by the law is entitled to end-of-service gratuity after completing at least one year of continuous service. End-of-service benefits for UAE nationals are governed by pension and social-security legislation.

For an eligible foreign worker, gratuity is based on the basic wage. It is calculated using 21 days of basic wage for each of the first five years and 30 days of basic wage for each year after that. After the first full year, any part of a later year is paid proportionately. Unpaid absence is not counted as service, and total gratuity cannot exceed the worker's wage for two years. The employer must pay wages and other employment entitlements within 14 days after the contract expires.

Separate employment regulations apply in Abu Dhabi Global Market. For gratuity calculations, the daily basic wage is calculated by dividing the annual basic wage by 365, and the basic wage used must be at least 50% of the employee's total annual wages. The federal two-year gratuity cap does not apply.

== See also ==
- Compromise agreement
- Golden handshake
- Golden parachute
- Layoff
- Voluntary redundancy
- Wrongful dismissal
- Unfair dismissal
- Just cause
- Unemployment benefits
