= Unfair dismissal in Namibia =

Namibian labour legislation on unfair dismissal

Unfair dismissal in Namibia is defined by the Namibian Labour Act of 2007. The burden of the proof that a dismissal was fair lies with the employer.

A termination of employment is regarded an unfair dismissal when the employer dismisses the employee for the following reasons as set out in the Labour Act of 2007:

- Without a valid and fair reason;
- with following procedures set out in section 34 if the reason for dismissal arise from section 34 (1) or subject to any code of good practise in section 137, a fair procedure in any other case[5].
- Because the employee discloses information that the employee is entitled or required to disclose to another person;
- When an employee fails or refuses to do anything that an employer must not lawfully permit or

require an employee to do;

- The employee exercises any right conferred by this Act or the terms of the Employment contract or collective agreement;
- The employee belongs, or has belonged, to a trade union;
- The employee takes part in the formation of a trade union
- The employee participates in the lawful activities of a trade union such as:
  - outside of working hours;
  - within working hours if permitted by the employer;
- It is unfair to dismiss an employee because of such employee’s sex, race, color, ethnic origin, religion, creed or social or economic status, political opinion or marital status.

Disputes between the Employer and Employee may be referred to the Commissioner or any district labour office. Complaints that used to go to the district labour court in the past now go to arbitration. The main powers of the Labour Commissioner are:

- to register disputes from employees and employers
- to prevent disputes from arising through conciliation or advising to the parties involve;
- to attempt, through conciliation, to resolve disputes referred to his/her office;
- to arbitrate, wherever applicable, a dispute that has been referred to his/her office if the dispute remains unresolved after conciliation

== See also ==
- Unfair dismissal
- Wrongful dismissal
