= Fortunato v. Office of Stephen M. Silston, D.D.S. =

- Court: Connecticut Superior Court
- Decided: June 23, 2004

Fortunato v. Office of Stephen M. Silston, D.D.S., 48 Conn. Supp. 636, 856 A.2d 530 (2004), is a United States employment law case, concerning wrongful termination.

== Facts ==
An employee filed a wrongful discharge suit, claiming that her employer, a dentist, terminated her after he learned that her daughter was thinking about filing a medical malpractice action against him.

She alleged that her termination fell under the public-policy exception to the at-will employment doctrine, in that it violated public policy underlying her right to free association, her daughter's right to open access to the courts, and the Connecticut Unfair Trade Practices Act (CUTPA), Conn. Gen. Stat. § 42-110b(a).

== Judgment ==
The court noted that "This employment termination matter raises an issue apparently new to Connecticut. It is alleged that an individual's exercise of a protected right has led to an employer's retaliatory termination of an employee in violation of public policy."

The court held that (1) the employer's conduct did not violate the employee's right to freely associate with her daughter; (2) employer-employee relationships did not fall within the definition of "trade" or "commerce" for the purposes of an action under the CUTPA; but (3) discharging an employee because a close relative was contemplating legal action against the employee's employer affected the relative's right of access to the courts and violated the public policy that Conn. Const. art. I, § 10 promoted, and the employee stated a valid claim for recovery under that theory.

== See also ==
- US labor law
