= Cantor Fitzgernald International v Horkulak =

2004 UK labour law case

Horkulak v Cantor Fitzgerald International
- Court: Court of Appeal of England and Wales
- Decided: 14 October 2004
- Citations: [2004] EWCA Civ 1287, [2005] ICR 402

Case opinions
- Potter LJ, Carnworth LJ and Bodey J

Keywords
- Bonus, wrongful dismissal

Horkulak v Cantor Fitzgerald International [2004] EWCA Civ 1287 is a UK labour law case holding that a discretionary bonus may form part of the damages for wrongful dismissal, if the sum of bonuses is predictable.

== Facts ==
Mr Horkulak traded derivatives on a 3 year fixed contract paying £250k with an annual discretionary bonus. He claimed constructive and wrongful dismissal after an episode of bullying and abuse. The employer did not pay him the bonus, and he claimed this should be included in the figure for compensation.

== Judgment ==
The Court of Appeal held the discretion in awarding a bonus had to be exercised honestly and in good faith, not capriciously, arbitrarily or unreasonably. Because Mr Harkuluk was constructively and wrongfully dismissed as a result of bullying and abuse, the bonus was a part of damages and the court could predict what would be given. The discretionary factor did not take the bonus out of the scope for damages. Damages were however reduced from £900k slightly given the failure to mitigate.

== See also ==
- UK labour law
- Unfair dismissal
