= Tottenham Green Under Fives' Centre v Marshall (No 2) =

Tottenham Green Under Fives’ Centre v Marshall (No 2)
- Court: Employment Appeal Tribunal
- Citation: [1991] ICR 320

Case opinions
- Potter LJ, Carnworth LJ and Bodey J

Keywords
- Bonus, wrongful dismissal

Tottenham Green Under Fives’ Centre v Marshall (No 2) [1991] ICR 320 is a UK labour law case concerning a genuine occupational requirement for a children's nursery.

== Facts ==
Five of seven staff at the centre, N15 4GZ, were white and one black person was leaving. The Centre advertised for an Afro-Caribbean and Mr Marshall, a white man, was turned down for an interview. The children were 84% black. The Centre argued their advertisement was covered by RRA 1976 s 5(2)(d) and argued that a black person would be better at maintaining a cultural link, dealing with parents and speaking and reading sometimes in dialect, as well as looking after their skin and health, including plaiting hair.

The Tribunal held the only criterion on which Mr Marshall would not be as effective would be reading and speaking, but this had been the ‘least emphasised’ of the centre's justifications ‘in the nature of a desirable extra and no more’.

== Judgment ==
The Employment Appeal Tribunal allowed the appeal, holding that the Tribunal were not allowed to disregard a factor relied on as a genuine occupational qualification defence, unless it was so trivial that it was de minimis, or that it was ‘a sham or a smokescreen’. That was not the case here, and the justification was ‘relatively unimportant but not trivial’.

The holding was that the job requirement was legitimate, which is an exception to the general rule that employers can't discriminate based on race.

== See also ==
- UK labour law
- Unfair dismissal
