= Brockmeyer =

Brockmeyer is a surname. Notable people with the surname include:

- Henry Clay Brockmeyer (1826–1906), German-American politician
- Oscar Brockmeyer (1883–1954), American soccer player
- Win Brockmeyer (1907–1980), American football coach

== See also ==
- Brockmeyer v. Dun & Bradstreet, legal case in Wisconsin
