= Barber v Somerset CC =

- Court: House of Lords
- Citations: [2004] 13, [2004] ICR 457

Keywords
- Wrongful dismissal

Barber v Somerset CC [2004] UKHL 13 is a UK labour law case, concerning wrongful dismissal.

== Facts ==
Heard along with the Hatton case, Mr Barber was a maths teacher at East Bridgwater Community School (previously Sydenham Comprehensive School) who had to take on more work given funding cuts, and was working between 61 and 70 hours a week. He was head of department but then had to become the ‘Mathematical Area of Experience Co-ordinator’. He took off three weeks, and returned. The employer was unsympathetic. His work worsened and then Mr Barber had a mental collapse in November 1996, and took early retirement at 52 in March 1997.

First Instance awarded £101,000 in general and special damages.

== Judgment ==
Lord Hope and Lord Rodger gave short opinions. Lord Walker held that Mr Barber should receive £72,547 for the employer's breach of duty by failing to take steps to ensure his health was sound following his three-week break. The school managers should have reassessed Mr Barber's workload for the sake of his health.

Lord Bingham, Lord Steyn concurred with Lord Walker.
