= Port of London Authority v Payne =

British labour law case

- Court: Court of Appeal of England and Wales
- Citations: [1993] EWCA Civ 26, [1994] IRLR 9

Keywords
- Unfair dismissal

Port of London Authority v Payne [1993] EWCA Civ 26 is a UK labour law case, concerning unfair dismissal and the remedy of reinstatement.

== Facts ==
The Port of London Authority attempted to dismiss trade union officials. In July 1989 they wished to reduce workers at Tilbury. Dockworkers were dismissed and 17 were shop stewards. They claimed the dismissals were actually motivated by their being union officials. An industrial tribunal found the complaints to be justified. It ordered re-engagement under the Employment Protection (Consolidation) Act 1978 section 69 for 12 applicants, and gave compensation to the others. The Port of London Authority did not comply with the orders. Under section 75A a new tribunal found that on the balance of probabilities it was practicable to comply with the order, and so made a special award of compensation.

The EAT upheld the Port of London Authority's appeal against the re-engagement order.

== Judgment ==
The Court of Appeal denied reinstatement because the employer had shown there were no vacancies and it would be disruptive to ask others to take voluntary redundancy. The Tribunal had failed to give due weight to the employer's commercial judgment about that practicability, unless the employer was to be disbelieved.

Neill LJ said the following.

The employer does not have to show that reinstatement or reengagement was impossible. It is a matter of what is practicable in the circumstances of the employer’s business at the relevant time.
