= Honda Canada Inc v Keays =

Canadian Supreme Court employment law case

- Supreme Court of Canada

Hearing: 20 February 2008 Judgment: 27 June 2008
- Full case name: Honda Canada Inc. operating as Honda of Canada Mfg. v. Kevin Keays
- Citations: 2008 SCC 39, [2008] 2 SCR 362
- Docket No.: 31739
- Prior history: APPEAL and CROSS‑APPEAL from Keays v. Honda Canada Inc., 2006 CanLII 33191 (29 September 2006), Court of Appeal (Ontario, Canada), reversing in part Keays v. Honda Canada Inc., 2005 CanLII 8730 (17 March 2005), Superior Court of Justice (Ontario, Canada)
- Ruling: Appeal allowed in part, Justices LeBel and Fish dissenting in part. Cross‑appeal dismissed.

Holding
- No presumptions about the role that an employee's managerial level plays should be adopted in determining reasonable notice on termination of employment. Damages resulting from the manner of dismissal will be available if they result from the circumstances described in Wallace v. United Grain Growers Ltd., and such damages should be awarded through an award that reflects actual damages rather than by extending the notice period.

Court membership
- Chief Justice: Beverley McLachlin; Puisne Justices: Michel Bastarache, Ian Binnie, Louis LeBel, Marie Deschamps, Morris Fish, Rosalie Abella, Louise Charron, Marshall Rothstein

Reasons given
- Majority: Bastarache, joined by McLachlin, Binnie, Deschamps, Abella, Charron, and Rothstein
- Concur/dissent: LeBel, joined by Fish

Honda Canada Inc v Keays [2008] 2 S.C.R. 362, 2008 SCC 39 is a leading case of the Supreme Court of Canada that has had significant impact in Canadian employment law, in that it reformed the manner in which damages are to be awarded in cases of wrongful dismissal and it declared that such awards were not affected by the type of position an employee may have had.

== Background ==
=== Widespread use of the "Wallace bump" ===
In Wallace v United Grain Growers Ltd, the Supreme Court held that bad faith on the part of an employer in how it handled the termination of an employee was another factor that is properly compensated for by an addition to the period of reasonable notice. Such an increase came to be known as the "Wallace bump," and claims that included it became so frequent that the courts began to criticize the practice. In Yanez v. Canac Kitchens, Echlin J declared:

[39] It has been long accepted that employers should be discouraged from asserting "soft" cases of just cause. Indeed, there are sanctions against counsel and their clients who assert cause and then abandon it at the outset of trial.

[40] The time has now come to express this Court's disapproval of routine assertions of "Wallace damage" claims which are not justified by the facts.

[41] Such claims seriously impede the potential consensual resolution of disputes which could otherwise be settled well short of trial. Additionally, the assertion and defence of specious "Wallace claims" can consume large amounts of valuable court time; can increase the costs to all concerned; and can generally drive the parties apart.

[42] While these comments are not, in any way, intended to discourage meritorious "Wallace damage claims", thought must be given in future cases to appropriate deterrents against plaintiffs who assert "Wallace claims" which are clearly without merit and should not have been advanced. Sanctions could include a diminution of either the costs award or the amount awarded for such dismissal claims. Unmeritorious "Wallace claims" for bad faith firings ought not to be an apparently automatic inclusion in every plaintiff's prayer for relief.

[43] I make no reduction in the amount awarded to this plaintiff in this instance, nor do I reduce the amount granted for costs. However, in future cases, clearly unmeritorious claims for "Wallace damages", having little or no foundation on the evidence, may well face sanctions.

=== The case at hand ===
Keays was hired in 1986 by Honda of Canada Manufacturing in Alliston, Ontario, to work first on the assembly line and later in data entry. In 1997 he was diagnosed as having chronic fatigue syndrome, upon which he ceased work and received disability insurance benefits until 1998, when the insurance company determined that he could return to work full‑time. Keays continued to absent himself, and was placed in Honda's disability program, wherein absence was allowed with proof it was related to a disability.

Subsequent absence proved to be of longer duration than indicated in notes from his doctor(s). In 2000 Honda asked Keays to meet with an occupational medicine specialist to determine how his disability could be accommodated. Before a meeting could be arranged, Keays retained counsel out of concern that he would ultimately be terminated. His counsel sent a letter outlining his concerns and offering to work toward resolution. Honda did not respond.

In its meeting with Keays, Honda expressed concern over deficiencies in the notes from Keays' doctor(s), and advised in such matters they deal with associates directly and not with third-party advocates. The next day, Keays told Honda that, on the advice of counsel, he would not meet with the specialist without explanation of the purpose, methodology, and parameters of the consultation. Keays did not come to work for a week following this incident. On his return, he was given a written warning that failure to meet with the specialist would result in his termination. He refused to do so, and Honda terminated his employment. Keays subsequently sued Honda for wrongful dismissal.

== The courts below ==
=== At first instance ===
The Ontario Superior Court of Justice ruled in favour of Keays. Justice John McIsaac concluded that Honda bore the burden to show just cause for termination and that it had failed to carry that burden. Specifically, he ruled:

- Keays was entitled to 15 months' notice, which was increased to 24 months because of Honda's bad faith in the manner of the termination.
- Because the notice period was increased, it was not necessary to award additional damages for the infliction of nervous shock or emotional distress.
- While the court did not have jurisdiction to consider a tort based on a breach of rights under the Human Rights Code, such complaints could constitute "independent actionable wrongs" such as to trigger an award of punitive damages.
- Since Keays did not plead aggravated damages, (Note: as defined in Wallace) his claim for lost disability benefits based on his total disability caused by the wrongful termination was denied.
- Because of Honda's "litany of acts of discrimination and harassment in relation to his attempts to resolve his accommodation difficulties", $500,000 in punitive damages was awarded to Keays.
- Keays was awarded costs on a substantial indemnity basis, adding a 25 percent premium, which together totalled $610,000.

=== In the Court of Appeal ===
The Court of Appeal for Ontario dismissed the appeal, but reduced the amount of punitive damages to $100,000.

- Justice Stephen T. Goudge, writing for the court regarding the availability of punitive damages, (Note: citing McKinley v. BC Tel, 2001 SCC 38, [2001] 2 SCR 161 (28 June 2001)) held that acts of discrimination in breach of human rights legislation may serve as a separate actionable wrong so as to give rise to a punitive damages award in a wrongful dismissal case. He rejected Honda's argument that the Code offers a complete remedial scheme that permits punitive damages only in the event of prosecution with the written consent of the Attorney General and only to a maximum fine of $25,000.
- Justice Marc Rosenberg, writing for a 2–1 majority, held that punitive damages must be reduced, because the trial judge had relied on findings of fact not supported by the evidence and because the award failed to accord with the fundamental principle of proportionality.

=== National debate ===
Keays granted the largest award of punitive damages in a wrongful dismissal case in Canadian judicial history, and it created considerable discussion as to whether it was a harbinger of things to come. It was also argued that the Court of Appeal ruling could be used in support of expanded damage awards at arbitration and before human rights tribunals.

=== Leave to appeal ===
In March 2007, leave to appeal was granted with costs in any event of the cause by the Supreme Court of Canada:

- Honda appealed with respect to the finding of wrongful dismissal, the award of damages and cost premium.
- Keays cross-appealed with respect to the reduction in punitive damages, as well as arguing that a separate tort of discrimination should be recognized.

== At the Supreme Court ==
The appeal was allowed in part, and the cross-appeal was dismissed. The damages for conduct in dismissal and punitive damages awards were set aside. At other levels, costs should be at a partial indemnity scale and the cost premium set aside.

Before analyzing the case, Justice Michel Bastarache observed that the trial judge made several "palpable and overriding errors", which made it necessary to review the record in some detail. The case also presented an opportunity "to clarify and redefine some aspects of the law of damages in the context of employment", and more specifically:

1. What factors should be considered when allocating compensatory damages in lieu of notice for wrongful dismissal.
2. The basis for and calculation of damages for conduct in dismissal.
3. The need to avoid overlap of damages for conduct in dismissal and punitive damage awards.

=== Damages in the context of employment ===
Justice Bastarache held that:

- Reasonable notice is determined by the character of the employment, the length of service, the age of the employee and the availability of similar employment, having regard to experience, training and qualifications. (Note: Bardal v. Globe & Mail Ltd. (1960), 24 DLR (2d) 140, adopted in Machtinger v. HOJ Industries Ltd., 1992 CanLII 102, [1992] 1 SCR 986 (30 April 1992))
- The particular circumstances of the individual should be the concern of the courts in determining the appropriate period of reasonable notice. Traditional presumptions about the role that managerial level plays in reasonable notice can always be rebutted by evidence.
- Damages are confined to the loss suffered as a result of the employer’s failure to give proper notice and that no damages are available to the employee for the actual loss of his or her job and/or pain and distress that may have been suffered as a consequence of being terminated. (Note: Addis v Gramophone Co Ltd [1909] UKHL 1, [1909] AC 488 (26 July 1909), affirmed in Peso Silver Mines Ltd. (N.P.L.) v. Cropper, 1966 CanLII 75, [1966] SCR 673 (20 June 1966) and Vorvis v. Insurance Corporation of British Columbia, 1989 CanLII 93, [1989] 1 SCR 1085 (4 May 1989))
- It was no longer necessary that there be an independent actionable wrong before damages for mental distress can be awarded for breach of contract, and therefore there is only one rule by which compensatory damages for breach of contract should be assessed. (Note: Fidler v. Sun Life Assurance Co. of Canada, 2006 SCC 30 at par. 49 and 54, [2006] 2 SCR 3 (29 June 2006), based on Hadley v Baxendale, (1854) 9 Ex 341, 156 ER 145)
- Damages resulting from the manner of dismissal must then be available only if they result from the circumstances described in Wallace, namely where the employer engages in conduct during the course of dismissal that is "unfair or is in bad faith by being, for example, untruthful, misleading or unduly insensitive."
- Fidler makes it unnecessary to pursue an extended analysis of the scope of any implied duty of good faith in an employment contract.
- Damages attributable to conduct in the manner of dismissal are always to be awarded under the Hadley principle. Moreover, in cases where damages are awarded, no extension of the notice period is to be used to determine the proper amount to be paid. The amount is to be fixed according to the same principles and in the same way as in all other cases dealing with moral damages.

=== Majority in the appeal ===
In the case at hand:

- Punitive damages were not well justified, as there was no basis for the judge’s decision on the facts. (Note: according to the criteria in Whiten v. Pilot Insurance Co., 2002 SCC 18, [2002] 1 SCR 595 (22 February 2002))
- There was no breach of human rights legislation serving as an actionable wrong. Creating a disability program such as the one in place at Honda cannot be equated with a malicious intent to discriminate against persons with a particular affliction.
- By extension, discrimination is precluded as an independent cause of action, as a plaintiff is precluded from pursuing a common law remedy when human rights legislation contains a comprehensive enforcement scheme for violations of its substantive terms. (Note: as held in Seneca College v. Bhadauria, 1981 CanLII 29, [1981] 2 SCR 181 (22 June 1981))
- Honda's conduct was not sufficiently egregious or outrageous to warrant an award of punitive damages.
- The premium assessed on costs was set aside, under the rule adopted in Walker v. Ritchie.

=== Dissent in the appeal ===
While agreeing with the majority with respect to setting aside the punitive damages and cost premium, Justice Louis LeBel believed that the award of additional ("Wallace") damages should stand, as there was ample evidence to support the trial judge's conclusion that Honda acted in bad faith.

== Impact ==
Keays has attracted considerable debate and controversy:

- Concern has been expressed that the majority opinion misconstrued Honda's actions, as the facts tend to suggest that Honda was trying to intimidate Keays, implying that he was either mistaken or dishonest about his condition (as noted in the dissent).
- By incorporating Baxendale into Canadian employment law, the court rescinded a century's worth of case law that recognized the special significance of the employment contract.
- Employees have lost their bargaining power during severance negotiations, as any claim for bad-faith damages must be advanced in the context of litigation, and employees must also prove the detrimental effects of any damages claimed.
- Keays also demonstrates that the Supreme Court of Canada is prepared to intervene and "right a ship" that it believes has drifted off course.
- The court's decision means the focus remains on whether an employer has acted candidly, reasonably, and honestly in the manner of dismissal. There is no new or higher threshold for establishing bad faith conduct.
- The judgment is clear in that, as long as causation is proven, the employer must compensate the employee for the harm he has suffered.
- In order to ensure that employers treat people fairly at the time of dismissal, Keays damages must be made available to employees who have mitigated their losses by securing other work during the notice period. Accordingly, under other SCC case law, damages for bad faith are not subject to mitigation.
- It is argued that the court was incorrect in its acceptance of a Baxendale framework for awarding damages for all reasonably foreseeable losses arising from a breach of contract—rather, damages for mental distress in the manner of dismissal should be justified by reference to the employer's obligation of good faith in the manner of dismissal.
- Most lawyers consider Wallace not to be dead, but to have evolved, and others point out that Keays damages may result in higher monetary awards in certain circumstances.

=== Determination of "bad faith" by employers ===
Subsequent jurisprudence has identified several key areas where an employer's conduct will constitute bad faith that will attract Wallace damages:

1. Making false accusations,
2. Damaging the employee's prospects of finding another job,
3. Misrepresenting the reasons for termination,
4. Firing the employee to ensure deprivation of a benefit, and
5. Firing the employee in front of coworkers.

=== Award of Wallace damages after Keays ===
While the effect of Keays was to ensure that Wallace damages be reserved for special cases and not be handed out as a matter of course, post-Keays cases are revealing significant trends:

1. Employees have been suing—successfully in many cases—for an extension of the notice period as Wallace damages even after Keays.
2. Courts seem to be ignoring Keays and basing Wallace damages on the employer's bad faith conduct alone without looking at evidence of the actual mental distress the conduct actually inflicted on the employee.
3. There is evidence that Wallace damages are increasing in value.
4. Wallace damages are being applied to other kinds of losses the employee actually suffers as a result of the employer's conduct, but there is resistance in the appellate courts as to whether they are appropriate.

== See also ==
- List of Supreme Court of Canada cases (McLachlin Court)
