= British Home Stores Ltd v Burchell =

- Court: Employment Appeal Tribunal
- Citations: [1980] ICR 303, [1978] IRLR 379

Keywords
- Unfair dismissal

British Home Stores Ltd v Burchell [1980] ICR 303 is a UK labour law case, concerning unfair dismissal.

== Facts ==
Miss Burchell got her job back at British Home Stores Ltd, and did not appear to contest the appeal by the employer against a tribunal decision about her dismissal.

== Judgment ==
Arnold J said the following.

The case is one of an increasingly familiar sort in this tribunal, in which there has been a suspicion or belief of the employee's misconduct entertained by the employers; it is on that ground that dismissal has taken place; and the tribunal then goes over that to review the situation as it was at the date of dismissal. The central point of appeal is what is the nature and proper extent of that review. We have had cited to us, we believe, really all the cases which deal with this particular aspect in the recent history of this tribunal over the past three or four years; and the conclusions to be drawn from the cases we think are quite plain. What the tribunal have to decide every time is, broadly expressed, whether the employer who discharged the employee on the ground of the misconduct in question (usually, though not necessarily, dishonest conduct) entertained a reasonable suspicion amounting to a belief in the guilt of the employee of that misconduct at that time. That is really stating shortly and compendiously what is in fact more than one element. First of all, there must be established by the employer the fact of that belief; that the employer did believe it. Secondly, that the employer had in his mind reasonable grounds upon which to sustain that belief. And thirdly, we think, that the employer, at the stage at which he formed that belief on those grounds, at any rate at the final stage at which he formed that belief on those grounds, had carried out as much investigation into the matter as was reasonable in all the circumstances of the case. It is the employer who manages to discharge the onus of demonstrating those three matters, we think, who must not be examined further.

[...]

...the tribunal has to consider whether there was a genuine belief on the part of the employer that the employee was guilty of the alleged misconduct, whether that belief was reasonably founded as a result of the employer carrying out a reasonable investigation, and whether a reasonable employer would have dismissed the employee for that misconduct.
