= Wrongful dismissal in the United Kingdom =

Law of employment rights in the UK

In United Kingdom law, the concept of wrongful dismissal refers exclusively to dismissal contrary to the contract of employment, which effectively means premature termination, either due to insufficient notice or lack of grounds. Although wrongful dismissal is usually associated with lack of notice sometimes it can also be caused by arbitrary dismissal where no notice was required but certain grounds were specified in the contract as being the only ones available but none existed.

== Definitions ==
Wrongful dismissal does not terminate the contract of employment – it is a repudiatory breach, i.e. one entitling the employee to consider themselves no longer bound to employment on the basis of the employer no longer considering itself bound to employ the employee. The employer's repudiatory breach (wrongful dismissal) forces the employee to accept it, as they are prevented from earning from the employer and required to mitigate by working for someone else, thus terminating the contract.

This does not follow contract law and is an invention by judges, disliked by others, designed to reflect the reality of employment, using the dual fictions that because the right to wages depends on the obligation to work, there is no right to wages if the employer tells the employee not to work (forgetting that the employer is not able to terminate the obligation to work other than in accordance with the contract), and that the employee has accepted the repudiation by not working for the employer even though they are willing and able. Otherwise, the employee would be entitled to stay at home at the employer's request, yet sue for unpaid wages as a debt.

An employer is only entitled to dismiss an employee without notice under any of three circumstances:

- in the first month,
- if the contract says so, or
- if the employee conducts themselves so as to undermine the trust and confidence of the employer, such that the employer should no longer be required to retain the employee in their employment.

The last example, trust and confidence, is commonly known as "gross misconduct", but employment law only distinguishes between misconduct that justifies dismissal and misconduct that does not. Conduct entitling the employer to terminate the contract is conduct indicating the employee no longer considers themselves bound by it and so is technically accepting the termination caused by the employee. Gross misconduct is in reality a vague list of offences that could most easily justify summary dismissal for a first offence.

Dismissal for a reason contrary to statute or contrary to a statutory procedure is described as "unfair dismissal"; however, not all wrongful dismissals are unfair dismissals. Dismissal by forcing somebody to resign through serious breach of contract is known as constructive dismissal, and constructive dismissal is usually a wrongful dismissal due to lack of notice.

=== Employer loses restrictive covenants ===
If an employer dismisses an employee without legally required notice then the employee is usually not bound by restrictive covenants. (Note: Increasingly, however, courts treat pay in lieu of notice as curing lack of notice.) This means the employer of a senior employee privy to company secrets should be careful not to unjustifiably summarily dismiss them, put them on garden leave or pay them in lieu of notice without a contractual provision allowing it, or even miscalculate their notice period a day too short.

Sometimes an employer can restore such covenants in a compromise agreement by paying the employee a nominal sum. The employer cannot circumvent the risk of a summary dismissal turning out to have been unlawful by giving notice, as that would imply the employee's breach of contract was insufficient to justify summary dismissal.

=== Notice period ===
The notice period will usually be in the written agreement; otherwise, there are statutory minimums, but a court can imply a reasonable period and often will if it thinks the employee has been treated poorly – for example, one week can turn into a month, and one month can turn into three months. The statutory minimums are one week for one month to two years' service, then one extra week per year of service, from two to 12 years, up to a maximum of 12 weeks. The minimums will also override contractual provisions if insufficient.

Common law notice, used by courts where the contract is silent, depends on the work, seniority, length of service and payment intervals, but not on what the employer can afford; senior specialists can be given six or even up to twelve months.

=== Right to work ===
The employee is always entitled to be paid during their employment and the required notice period; they are often also entitled to work. Requiring the employee to spend the time in leisure (i.e. at home, on vacation, etc.) in order to "get them out of the way" can be considered illegal, even though it may be usually considered a benefit to the employee.

If an employer wants an exiting employee out of the way and does not have the contractual right to put them on garden leave, or pay them in lieu of notice, then the only options are to encourage the use of holiday and offer a compromise agreement to waive their right to sue, in return for the intentional breach of contract. Sometimes the breach turns the termination payment into compensation rather than wages, making it tax-free, so the employee may be only too happy to go along with the ruse.

=== Remedies ===
In a tribunal for wrongful dismissal, the remedy would be compensation; in court, the remedy would be damages, but rarely an injunction. An injunction could be awarded to enforce a contractual disciplinary procedure, but because compensation is usually an adequate remedy for premature termination, an injunction is generally not available to keep a job going, even in a redundancy situation where the selection process has been circumvented.

Action for wrongful dismissal can be brought within 6 years following the breach of an employment contract.

=== Compensation ===
==== Losses ====
For the notice period the employer must pay wages (including any anticipated pay rise) and benefits except holiday; for wrongful dismissal, it is only possible to claim for lost earnings and damage to reputation, not for the manner of dismissal.

==== Benefits ====
Benefits include:

- pension,
- commission accrued and owed,
- bonus,
- overtime,
- accrued holiday on unpaid sick leave,
- income protection benefit and personal use of company car (usually running cost or hire car).

Share options will often be excluded by small print.

==== Bonuses ====
To avoid arguments about whether bonuses would have been earned, it may make sense to compromise by paying the usual sort of overtime or bonus the employee would have gotten if working. Courts are astute to employers trying to avoid paying commission due to contrived circumstances such as having dismissed an employee before pay day. The employer is under a duty to act in good faith, not to exercise discretion spitefully or in bad faith and not to act perversely, irrationally or capriciously.

==== Deductions ====
The deductions that can be made from compensation are:

- replacement earnings or what the employee should have earned had he bothered to try (failure to mitigate),
- social security actually received or which could have been had the employee applied, and
- compensation already awarded for unfair dismissal under the same heading.

==== Mitigation ====
Because it is a contract claim, the employee has a duty to mitigate their loss by seeking employment as soon as possible, for as high a wage as possible; therefore, the tribunal or court would deduct earnings from a new job, during the correct notice period from compensation due. However, if the employer attempts to do this unilaterally, it may simply trigger a claim that would not otherwise have happened, had it turned a blind eye to the employee making a couple of weeks' wages out of the situation. Due to the disproportionate cost of employment litigations, it is usually sensible for an employer to err on the side of generosity, trying to ensure the parting of ways is amicable rather than showing off how many loopholes can be found.

Pensions cannot be deducted. It is possible for a contract to be worded so as to make the pay in lieu of notice a debt, to which the employee is entitled even if they get a new job the next day.

== Risks ==
=== Breaches of contract ===
Wrongful dismissal is the lesser type of unlawful dismissal, costing only what it would have done to keep the employee during the notice period. However, it can be slightly dangerous for the employer due to the potential loss of restrictive covenants, and due to the employee being able to start alleging all sorts of breaches of contract, to try to use up the £25,000 breach of contract allowance in a tribunal. If the employee takes the employer to court instead, there is no limit and the case could end with significantly high costs.

==== Examples ====
Breaches of contract by the employer serious enough to create a wrongful dismissal are also a constructive dismissal; wrongful dismissals not caused by insufficient notice would have been caused by another breach, such as of the duty not to destroy the mutual bond of trust, and have included failure to inform of pension rights.

The employer has no duty to act what would normally be called in good faith, but must not act in bad faith or insufficiently in good faith such that it breaks the mutual bond of trust. The obligation is usually not to do anything bad as opposed to doing something good.

==== Losses ====
The employee could allege extra breaches of contract and losses including:

- loss of earnings and psychiatrist fees for psychiatric injury caused by wrongful dismissal,
- loss of earnings for the time it would have taken to follow the correct disciplinary procedure,
- loss of earnings for unpaid sick leave caused by bullying,
- loss of earnings caused by demotion,
- loss of earnings caused by stigma of association with a corrupt employer affecting many employees (as opposed to an incident of dishonesty),
- redundancy pay lost due to being terminated just before they would have qualified for two years' service, and
- loss of health insurance.

== Defences ==
Successful defences have been:

- the employer discovers that the employee was in such serious breach, that they could have been summarily dismissed,
- the contract allowed dismissal without disciplinary procedure, as long as notice was given or paid in lieu.

== Relation to unfair dismissal ==
A wrongful dismissal can be a fair or unfair dismissal, just as an unfair dismissal may or may not be a wrongful dismissal in terms of whether the correct notice was given.

If the employee had two years service, they could claim unfair dismissal if there was something wrong with the decision to dismiss as opposed to the length of notice. If the wrongfulness was the lack of grounds then is it likely to also be an unfair dismissal.

The unfair dismissal claim would, if the employee is well advised, be in respect of the post-termination period and sue in court for wrongful dismissal in respect of the notice period, thus stretching out the statutory limits by making the unfair dismissal limit only start running from a later date to allow perhaps more loss of earnings and ignoring the breach of contract limit by using the court instead of tribunal to deal with wrongful dismissal. The burden of proving double recovery is on the employer and tribunal awards for unfair dismissal can be vague as to what and when they are for.

== Relation to constructive dismissal ==
A wrongful dismissal can be actual or constructive, but a constructive dismissal is almost certain to be a wrongful one, since the correct notice will not have been given if the dismissal was caused by a resignation, itself caused by the employer's serious breach of contract. An employee who was constructively dismissed, as well as possibly having a claim for breach of the duty not to destroy the bond of mutual trust, will usually have a claim for wrongful dismissal. As only economic loss can be claimed for breach of contract, the main loss will be earnings due to the lost notice period, as opposed to any disgruntlement about the manner or reason for dismissal, so the constructive nature of the dismissal tends to disappear into the claim for lost notice period.

== See also ==
- Constructive dismissal
- Unfair dismissal
