= Voluntary redundancy =

Financial incentive

Voluntary redundancy (VR) or voluntary severance, also known as golden boot compensation, is a financial incentive offered by an organisation to encourage employees to voluntarily resign, typically in downsizing or restructuring situations. The purpose is to avoid compulsory redundancies or layoffs.

== Reasons ==
A voluntary redundancy programme is not always driven by short term revenue goals. It can also be motivated by the strategic choice to change the age structure within the company. People who accept voluntary redundancy may at times return to the company after changes in the company's prospects, strategic vision, or economic climate and, in doing so, may bring new ideas.

== Examples ==
LM Ericsson implemented a VR programme in the spring of 2006. It offered the programme to 17,000 employees in Sweden between the ages of 35 and 50. Those who voluntarily left were given between 12 and 16 months of severance, 50,000 kronor, and a course in entrepreneurship coupled with job placement services. The goal was to have a maximum of 1,000 employees volunteer for the programme.

Delta Air Lines, in the aftermath of its bankruptcy filing, offered a programme that included limited flight benefits for a set period after voluntary resignation. In light of rising fuel prices, it turned back to a VR programme. The particulars of that severance package are unknown.

== See also ==
- Compromise agreement
- Golden parachute
- Layoff
- Restructuring
- Severance package
