= Compromise agreement =

In the United Kingdom, a compromise agreement is a specific type of contract, regulated by statute, between an employer and its employee (or ex-employee) under which the employee receives consideration, often a negotiated financial sum, in exchange for agreeing that he or she will have no further claim against the employer as a result of any breach of a statutory obligation by the employer.

Except when ACAS have been involved and arranged a COT3 settlement, COT3 being the name of the form used, compromise agreements are the only means whereby an employee can waive statutory claims such as unfair dismissal, discrimination or entitlements to a redundancy payment. The agreement will only be valid where (i) it is in writing and (ii) the employee has received independent legal advice from a relevant adviser who has professional indemnity insurance. An employee cannot compromise potential future claims, though claims that have already arisen, unknown to the employee, can be waived. The Employment Rights Act 1996 provides at Section 203 for the conditions relating to the validity of Compromise Agreements. The Equality Act 2010 also regulates the conditions for the validity of Compromise Agreements, but a possible drafting error may have affected the scope of Compromise Agreements to settle discrimination complaints.

In practice, a compromise agreement will also contain a waiver of any claim for breach of contract as well as statutory claims, though such a waiver does not need to satisfy the same requirements in order to be valid, as a claim for breach of contract is a common-law claim.

Each agreement should be tailored to meet the facts and circumstances of the case. It is therefore difficult to adopt a one size fits all approach to drafting of a compromise agreement, although this approach might be used if appropriate in more generic cases. The detail and existence of a compromise agreement should remain confidential from third parties.

The advantage for the employer is that they are able to draw a line under an employee's departure or complaint and are protected from future claims. The advantage for the employee is the consideration, such as a financial sum, received in return is provided for by a legally-binding contract. In addition to confidentiality clauses, a Compromise Agreement may also include an agreed reference. A breach of the compromise agreement and any financial loss that breach may incur for the other party, can result in legal action in a court of law.

In January 2013, the UK Government proposed a number of changes. These included renaming compromise agreements as "settlement agreements".

== See also ==
- Layoff
- Severance package
- Voluntary redundancy
