= Lori Barth =

American songwriter

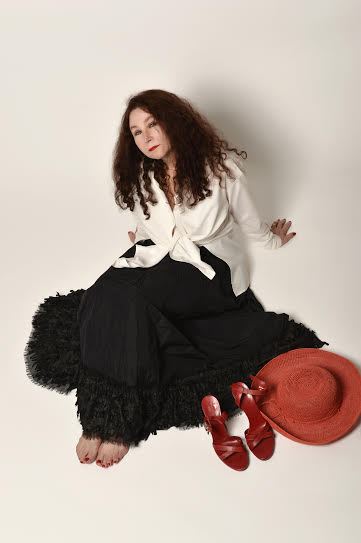
- Occupations: Songwriter, producer, singer, music journalist, guitarist

Lori Barth is an American songwriter who has written many popular songs, as well as a recording artist, record producer, journalist, and the senior editor of The Score for The Society of Composers & Lyricists.

== Early life ==
Lori Barth was born in Los Angeles, California and raised in the San Fernando Valley. She studied music and wrote songs at a young age. At age 16, she had a monthly column for Movie Teen Illustrated. After graduating from California State University, Northridge with a degree in history and journalism, she became the Assistant Fashion Editor at California Apparel News.

== Career ==
Barth switched careers, pursuing music full-time as a writer, performer and guitar teacher. As the latter, she coached Barbra Streisand for A Star is Born, Amy Irving for Honeysuckle Rose, Christina Applegate, Beau Bridges, Allison Sudol, and David Navarro from The Red Hot Chili Peppers. Barth had her own music school for over thirteen years with folk artist Bud Dashiell.

After closing the school, she became the editor for the quarterly journal of The Society of Composers and Lyricists called The Score. She earned two Deems Taylor awards for her work with The Score. She also has served on the board of directors for The Society of Composers.

As a songwriter, Barth co-wrote the theme song to Joyeux Noël entitled "I'm Dreaming of Home" with composer Phillip Rhombi. It has been performed at many international events including the 2008 Musique & Cinema Festival in Auxerre, France with a 100 voice choir. It was also chosen for the 90th commemoration of the Canadian Battle of Battle of Vimy Ridge.

=== Hit Songs ===
Barth has several worldwide, platinum-selling songs including "Mi Cuerpo Pride Mas", "Arena Y Sol" sung by Mi Mundo, "Left of Center" sung by Dewi Pechler, and "I'm Dreaming of Home" the theme song to the film Joyeux Noel and "Gonna Get It Right" by Nikkole.

She has also written songs for Keb' Mo', A.J. Croce, Girlfriend, Sarah Geronimo, Mark Bautista and Claire de la Fuente, and contributing songs featured on the television show Brothers & Sisters, Smallville, and HBO and Lifetime Movies.

== Discography ==
Album	Artist	Role
I'm Dreaming of Home	Soundtrack Joyeux Noel	Lyricist
Gonna Get It Right	Nikkole Hall	Songwriter
The Other Team	Sweet California	Songwriter
Utopia	Brooks feat. Hope	Songwriter/Vocal Producer
Addicted To The NIght	Brooks & Fort feat. Adam Shenk	Songwriter/Vocal Producer
Mi Cuerpo Pide Mas	Marta Sanchez	Songwriter
Puppet Show Mr. Joe	Starmarie	Songwriter
Made In The U.S.A./Fun In The Sun/Shake It Off	Twinkle and Friends	Producer & Songwriter
Dancing On The Roof	Jason Farol	Songwriter
Christmas Girl	Sarah Geronimo	Songwriter
Till I Get it Right	Mark Winkler	Composer
Twinkle Time: Twinkle Theme, Best Friends, We Gotta Be A Team...	Twinkle and Friends	Producer & Songwriter
Aire	Luz Rios	Composer
Have Mercy	Amia Dane	Guitar, producer, programming, Synthesizer
I'll Be the One	Mark Bautista	Composer
Noel! Voices of Christmas	Various Artists	Poetry, Text
Obsession	Rachelle Ann Go	Composer, English Translations
Becoming	Sarah Geronimo	Composer, English Translations
Mandi Seekings	Mandi Seekings	Composer
Dream On	Mark Bautista	Composer
Lo Mejor de Marta Sanchez	Marta Sanchez	Composer
Lo Mejor de Marta Sanchez (Universal 2)	Marta Sanchez	Composer
Serie Top 10	Marta Sanchez	Composer
The History of Popstars	Various Artists	Composer
Garden of Earthly Delights: The Best of Mark Winkler	Mark Winkler	Composer
In Concert From Bucharest	Damian	Composer
Sensuel	Lori Barth	Composer, guitar, guitar (acoustic, Primary Artist, Vocals
Steppin Across the U.S.A., Vol. 1	Various Artists	Composer
Balla Habibi, Vol. 2	Various Artists	Composer
Mejores Anos De Nuestra Vida: Greatest Hits	Marta Sanchez	Composer
Sandstorm	Mera	Composer
Brazilicious	Ana Gazzola	Composer
One Step Closer	Marta Sanchez	Composer
Portraits of Innocence	Sandy Ross	Choir/Chorus
Shall We Dance?	Baila	Composer
Bumpin' in the Basement	Bob Leatherbarrow	Art Conception, Producer
Serie Millenium 21	Marta Sanchez	Composer
Ven a Mover Tu Cuerpo	Dulce Material	Composer
City Lights	Mark Winkler	Composer
Common Ground	David Tyler Martin	Songwriter
Style	Vanna Vanna	Composer
Momma, Where's My Daddy?	Keb' Mo'	Composer
Mas Pa'rriba	Banda MR-7	Composer
Vamos a Bailar [Polygram]	Various Artists	Composer
Macarena Dance	Various Artists	Composer
Mi Mundo	Marta Sanchez	Composer
Tales From Hollywood	Mark Winkler	Composer
A Modern Art/lowercase	Claire Martin	Songwriter
Buddha's Ear/Right Where You Are	Terry Wolman	Songwriter
I Want More of You	Andrea Holdclaw	Composer
Mi Cuerpo Pide Mas	Marta Sanchez	Songwriter
Silent Songs About Things That Don't Happen	Christoffer Hoyer	Composer
The Deedee Foster E.P.	Dee-Dee Foster	Composer
