= Brockmeyer v. Dun & Bradstreet =

- Court: Wisconsin Supreme Court
- Full case name: Charles J. Brockmeyer, Plaintiff-Respondent and Cross-Appellant-Petitioner, v. Dun & Bradstreet, a foreign corporation with registered agent being C.T. Corporation System, Defendant-Appellant and Cross-Respondent.
- Decided: July 1, 1983
- Citation: 113 Wis.2d 561; 335 N.W.2d 834

Case history
- Appealed from: Wisconsin Court of Appeals (109 Wis.2d 44, 1982)

Court membership
- Judges sitting: Bruce F. Beilfuss, Nathan S. Heffernan, Roland B. Day, Shirley S. Abrahamson, William G. Callow, Donald W. Steinmetz, Louis J. Ceci

Case opinions
- Decision by: Steinmetz
- Concur/dissent: Day, Callow, Ceci

Keywords
- At-will employment

Brockmeyer v. Dun & Bradstreet 113 Wis. 2d 561, 335 N.W.2d 834 (Wis. 1983), was a case in which the Wisconsin Supreme Court first identified that Wisconsin has some judicial exceptions to the employment at will doctrine.

== Facts ==
Charles J. Brockmeyer was employed at investment firm Dun & Bradstreet as a district manager of credit services, though he lacked a formal employment contract. After the employer settled a sex discrimination suit filed by the employee's former secretary, with whom he allegedly had an affair, the employer fired the employee. The court held that it was appropriate to create a public policy exception to the employment-at-will doctrine, as the termination had clearly violated a well-defined public policy, as evidenced by existing law. While the employer's actions may have constituted bad faith, they did not contravene the policies of any statute or constitutional provision. As the employee failed to prove that his discharge violated fundamental public policy, the decision for the employer was appropriate.

== Holding ==
The court affirmed the decision of the lower court in favor of the employer.

== Citations ==
The case is cited in Bammert v. Don's Super Valu, Inc.
