= Human resource policies =

Human resource policies are continuing guidelines on the approach of which an organization intends to adopt in managing its people. They represent specific guidelines to HR managers on various matters concerning employment and state the intent of the organization on different aspects of Human Resource management such as recruitment, promotion, compensation, training, selections etc. They therefore serve as a reference point when human resources management practices are being developed or when decisions are being made about an organization's workforce.

A good HR policy provides generalized guidance on the approach adopted by the organization, and therefore its employees, concerning various aspects of employment. A procedure spells out precisely what action should be taken in line with the policies.

Each organization has a different set of circumstances and so develops an individual set of human resource policies. The location an organization operates in will also dictate the content of their policies.

== Purposes ==
The establishment of policies can help an organization demonstrate, both internally and externally, that it meets requirements for diversity, ethics and training as well as its commitments in relation to regulation and corporate governance of its employees. For example, in order to dismiss an employee in accordance with employment law requirements, amongst other considerations, it will normally be necessary to meet provisions within employment contracts and collective bargaining agreements. The establishment of an HR Policy which sets out obligations, standards of behavior, and documents disciplinary procedures, is now the standard approach to meeting these obligations. HR policies provide frameworks within which consistent decisions are made and promote equity in the way in which people are treated.

HR policies can also be very effective at supporting and building the desired organizational culture. For example, recruitment and retention policies might outline the way the organization values a flexible workforce, compensation policies might support this by offering a 48/52 pay option where employees can take an extra four weeks holidays per year and receive less pay across the year.

In actuality, policies and procedures serve a number of purposes:

1. They provide clear communication between the organization and their employees regarding their condition of employment.
2. They form a basis for treating all employees fairly and equally.
3. They are a set of guidelines for supervisors and managers.
4. They create a basis for developing the employee handbook.
5. They establish a basis for regularly reviewing possible changes affecting employees.
6. They form a context for supervisor training programs and employee orientation programs.

In developing HR policies, there should be clear and consistent statement of the organization's policies regarding all conditions of employment and procedures for their equal and fair implementation. In order to fulfill this objective, policies and procedures should be:

- Clear and specific, but provide enough flexibility to meet changing conditions.
- Comply with all appropriate law and regulation.
- Consistent amongst one another and reflect an overall true and fair view approach to all employees.

HR policies are developed by making decisions and taking actions on the day-to-day problems of the organization. The process of developing HR policies involves the assessment of the following factors:

1. Identify the purpose and objectives which the organization wishes to attain regarding its Human Resources department.
2. Analysis of all the factors under which the organization's HR policy will be operating.
3. Examining the possible alternatives in each area which the HR policy statement is necessary.
4. Implementation of the policy through the development of a procedure to support the policy.
5. Communication of the policy and procedures adapted to the entire organization.
6. Auditing the policy so as to reveal the necessary areas requiring change.
7. Continuous revaluation and revision of policy to meet the current needs of the organization.

== Formulation ==
Human resource management consists of deliberate organizational activities designed to improve employee productivity and administration through such means as recruitment, compensation, performance, evaluation, training, record keeping and compliance. HR policies should be developed for key HR management functions covering eight commonly accepted responsibilities:

1. Labor management relations
2. Employment practices and placement
3. Workplace diversity
4. Health, safety and security
5. Human resources information systems
6. Human resource research
7. Training and development

The following steps should be taken when formulating or revising policies:

1. Gain understanding of the corporate culture and its shared values
2. Analyze existing policies: both written and unwritten existing policies.
3. Analyze external influences: HR policies are subject to the influence of many legislation, regulations and authorities, thus the codes of practice issued by the professional institutions should also be consulted.
4. Assess any areas where new policies are needed or existing policies are inadequate.
5. Check with managers, preferably starting with the organization's leadership team, on their views about HR policies and where they think could be improved.
6. Seek the view of employees about the HR policies, especially to the extent for which they are inherently fair and equitable and are implemented fairly and consistently.
7. Seek the view of the union's representatives.
8. Analyze the information retained in the previous steps and prepare the draft policies.
9. Consult, discuss and agree on policies with management and union representatives.

In order to write the first draft of the policies as step 7 have stated, the following content should be included:

- Policy name
- Effective date of the policy and the date of any revisions
- Approval status - At this stage, the status should be 'DRAFT'
- References - list other policies or documents related to this policy
- Purpose of the policy - what is it intended to promote or achieve
- Main policy statement
- Definition of any key concepts or terms mentioned in the policy need to be defined
- Eligibility or scope - Any stakeholders are covered by the policy
- How to deal with potential exceptions
- Positions in the organizations responsible for implementing and monitoring the policy
- Procedures for carrying out the policy - preferably written in numbered steps

== Types ==
HR policies could be classified on the basis of sources or description.

=== On the basis of source ===
On the basis of their source, human resource policies could be classified into

1. Originated Policies - These are the policies usually established by the senior managers in order to guide their subordinates.
2. Implicit Policies - These are the policies which are not formally expressed; they are inferred from the behavior of managers. They are also known as Implied Policies.
3. Imposed Policies - Policies are sometimes imposed on the business by external agencies such as government, trade associations and trade unions.
4. Appealed Policies - Appealed policies arise because the particular case is not covered by the earlier policies. In order to know how to handle some situations, subordinates may request or appeal for the formulation of specific policies.

=== On the basis of description ===
On the basis of description, policies may be general or specific.

1. General Policies - These policies do not relate to any specific issue in particular. General policies are formulated by an organization's leadership team. This kind of policies is called 'general' because they do not relate to any specific issue in particular.
2. Specific Policies - These policies are related to specific issues like staffing, compensation, collective bargaining etc. Specific policies must confirm to the pattern laid down by the general policies.

== Advantages ==
The following advantages are achieved by setting up HR policies:

1. They help managers at various levels of decision making to make decisions without consulting their superiors. Subordinates are more willing to accept responsibility because policies indicate what is expected of them and they can quote a written policy to justify their actions.
2. They ensure long term welfare of employees and makes for a good employer-employee relationship as favoritism and discrimination are reduced. Well-established policies ensure uniform and consistent treatment of all employees throughout the organization.
3. They lay down the guidelines pursued in the organization and thereby minimizes the personal bias of managers.
4. They ensure prompt action for taking decisions because the policies serve as standards to be followed. They prevent the wastage of time and energy involved in repeated analyses for solving problems of a similar nature.
5. They establish consistency in the application of the policies over a period of time so that each one in the organization gets a fair and just treatment. Employees know what action to expect in circumstances covered by the policies. Policies set patterns of behavior and permit employees to work more confidently.

== Influential factors ==
The following factors will influence the HR policies of an organization:

=== Laws of the country ===
The various labour laws and legislation pertaining to labour have to be taken into consideration. Policies should conform with the laws of the country, state, and/or province otherwise they are bound to cause problems for the organization.

=== Social values and customs ===
Social values and customs have to be respected in order to maintain consistency of behavior throughout the organization. The values and customs of all communities should be taken into account when framing policies.

=== Management philosophy and values ===
Management philosophy and values influence its action on matters concerning employees. Therefore, without a clear, broad philosophy and set values, it would be difficult for employees to understand management.

=== Financial impact ===
HR policies may affect productivity and an organization's overall finances if they create unnecessary burdens or red tape for the organization's workforce. Organizations may also want to consider how realistic it is to enforce a policy fairly or keep it up-to-date as these have the potential to create issues amongst employees.
