= Layoff =

Involuntary termination of employment of an employee due to business concerns

A layoff or downsizing is the temporary suspension or permanent termination of employment of an employee or, more commonly, a group of employees (collective layoff) for business reasons, such as personnel management or downsizing an organization. Originally, layoff referred exclusively to a temporary interruption in work, or employment but this has evolved to a permanent elimination of a position in both British and US English, requiring the addition of "temporary" to specify the original meaning of the word. A layoff is not to be confused with wrongful termination.

Laid off workers or displaced workers are workers who have lost or left their jobs because their employer has closed or moved, there was insufficient work for them to do, or their position or shift was abolished (Borbely, 2011). Downsizing in a company is defined to involve the reduction of employees in a workforce. Downsizing in companies became a popular practice in the 1980s and early 1990s, since it was seen as a way to deliver better shareholder value by helping reduce the costs of employers (downsizing, 2015). Research on downsizing in the US, UK, and Japan suggests that downsizing is being regarded by management as one of the preferred routes to help declining organizations, cutting unnecessary costs, and improve organizational performance. A layoff usually occurs as a cost-cutting measure. A study of 391 downsizing announcements of the S&P 100 firms for the period 1990–2006 found that layoff announcements resulted in a substantial increase in the companies’ stock prices and that the gain was larger when the company had prior layoffs. The authors suggested that the stock price manipulation alone creates a sufficient motivation for publicly traded corporations to adopt the practice of regular layoffs.

== Terminology ==
Euphemisms are often used to "soften the blow" in the process of firing and being fired. The term "layoff" originally meant a temporary interruption in work (and usually pay). The term became a euphemism for permanent termination of employment and now usually requires the addition of "temporary" to refer to the original meaning. A number of other euphemisms have been coined for "(permanent) layoff", including "downsizing", "excess reduction", "rightsizing", "leveraging synergies", "delayering", "smartsizing", "redeployment", "workforce reduction", "workforce optimization", "simplification", "force shaping", "recussion", "manage out people", "resource action", and "reduction in force" (also called "RIF", especially in the US government employment sector). "Mass layoff" is defined by the United States Department of Labor as 50 or more workers laid off from the same company around the same time. "Attrition" implies that positions will be eliminated as workers quit or retire. "Early retirement" means workers may quit now yet still remain eligible for their retirement benefits later.

"Redundancy" is a specific legal term in UK labour law with a definition in section 139 of the Employment Rights Act 1996: see Redundancy in United Kingdom law.

When an employer is faced with work of a particular type ceasing or diminishing at a particular location, it may be perceived as obfuscation. Firings imply misconduct or failure while layoffs imply economic forces beyond the employer's and employees' control, especially in the face of a recession.

== Common abbreviations for reduction in force ==
- RIF – A generic reduction in force, of undetermined method. Often pronounced like the word riff rather than spelled out. Sometimes used as a verb, as in "the employees were pretty heavily riffed".
- eRIF – Layoff notice by email.
- IRIF – Involuntary reduction in force – The employee(s) did not voluntarily choose to leave the company. This usually implies that the method of reduction involved either layoffs, firings, or both, but would not usually imply resignations or retirements. If the employee is fired rather than laid off, the term "with cause" may be appended to indicate that the separation was due to this employee's performance and/or behavior, rather than being financially motivated.
- VRIF – Voluntary reduction in force – The employee(s) did play a role in choosing to leave the company, most likely through resignation or retirement. In some instances, a company may exert pressure on an employee to make this choice, perhaps by implying that a layoff or termination would otherwise be imminent, or by offering an attractive severance or early retirement package. Conversely, the company is not obliged to accept an employee's decision and may not accept every employee who volunteers for a VRIF.
- WFR – Work force reduction.

== In the public sector ==
Following the 2008 financial crisis and the Great Recession, the public sector has seen significantly smaller job growth in employment versus the private sector, and layoffs have been used to ensure sustainability. As the public sector declines, the demand for services from the private sector declines as well. Layoffs in the public sector have put limitations on the growth rate of the private sector, inevitably burdening the entire flow of markets.

== Unemployment compensation ==
Risks of being laid off vary depending on the workplace and country a person is working in. Unemployment compensation in any country or workplace typically has two main factors. The first factor of unemployment compensation depends on the distribution of unemployment benefits in a workplace outlined in an employee handbook. The second factor is the risk of inequality being conditioned upon the political regime type in the country an employee is working in. The amount of compensation will usually depend on what level the employee holds in the company.

Packages may also vary if the employee is laid off, or voluntarily quits in the face of a layoff (VRIF). The method of separation may have an effect on a former employee's ability to collect whatever form of unemployment compensation might be available in their jurisdiction. In multiple U.S. states, workers who are laid off can file an unemployment claim and receive compensation. Depending on local or state laws, workers who leave voluntarily are generally ineligible to collect unemployment benefits, as are those who are fired for gross misconduct. Also, lay-offs due to a firm's moving production overseas may entitle one to increased re-training benefits. Some companies in the United States utilize Supplemental Unemployment Benefits. Since they were first introduced by organized labor and the Department of Labor in the early 1950s, and first issued in a Revenue Ruling by the IRS in 1956, SUB-Pay Plans have enabled employers to supplement the receipt of state unemployment insurance benefits for employees that experience an involuntary layoff. By establishing severance payments as SUB-Pay benefits, the payments are not considered wages for FICA, FUTA, and SUI tax purposes, and employee FICA tax. To qualify for SUB-Pay benefits, the participant must be eligible for state unemployment insurance benefits and the separation benefit must be paid on a periodic basis. There have also been increasing concerns about the organizational effectiveness of the post-downsized 'anorexic organization'. The benefits, which organizations claim to be seeking from downsizing, center on savings in labor costs, speedier decision making, better communication, reduced product development time, enhanced involvement of employees and greater responsiveness to customers (De Meuse et al. 1997, p. 168). However, some writers draw attention to the 'obsessive' pursuit of downsizing to the point of self-starvation marked by excessive cost-cutting, organ failure and extreme pathological fear of becoming inefficient. Hence 'trimming' and 'tightening belts' are the order of the day.

== Effects ==
Traditionally, layoffs directly affect the employee. However, the employee terminated is not alone in this. Layoffs affect the workplace environment and the economy as well as the employee. Layoffs have a widespread effect and the three main components of layoff effects are in the workplace, to the employee, and effects to the economy. One framework to examine the effects on the macro level is PSB, which examines the stakeholders perspective in global downsizing. This framework examines the global perspective of positive and negative stakeholders behavior during downsizing.

=== Effects of layoffs in the workplace ===
Layoffs have remained the greatest way for a company to cut costs. Although from the employer's perspective a layoff is beneficial for the business, layoffs create an uncertainty in the workplace environment and lowers other employees' job security as well as creates an apprehension and fear of termination for the remaining employees, and subsequently lowers overall motivation in the workplace environment. According to Healing the Wounds: Overcoming the Trauma of Layoffs and Revitalizing Downsized Organizations, in the post-layoff environment, there is a need for empathy, tangibility, self-knowledge, and relentlessly seeking customers among the surviving employees. The remaining employees may have feelings of survivors guilt. In order to diminish negative effects of layoffs, Wayne Cascio suggests alternative approaches to layoff and downsizing as "Responsible restructuring" approach. Optimism is critical for rebuilding the workplace environment because employees look to their leaders for stability and predictability. No matter the position in an organization, employees will look for job security.

=== Effects of layoffs to the employee ===
Employees (or former employees in this case) can be affected in several ways. When an employee is laid off temporarily, their general trust in long-term work may decrease, reducing expectations upon rehire. After an employee withstands a layoff, the effects can trickle into future employment and attitudes. Any case of layoffs may leave the former employee less inclined to trust future employers, which can lead to behavioral conflicts among co-workers and management. Layoffs can erode confidence, making employees feel insecure about their job performance and career prospects. Despite new employers not being responsible for a prior circumstances, job performance may still be affected by prior layoffs. Many companies work to make layoffs as minimally burdensome to the employee. At times employers may layoff multiple people at once to soften the impact.

- Denial stage is the first stage in the emotional reaction to change or layoffs, in which an employee denies that an organization change or layoff will occur.
- Anger stage is the second stage of the emotional reaction to downsizing, in which an employee becomes angry at the organization.
- Fear stage is the third emotional stage following an announcement of layoff, in which employees worry about how they will survive financially.
- Acceptance stage is the fourth and final stage of the emotional reaction to downsizing, in which employees accept that layoffs will occur and are ready to take steps to secure their future.

=== Effects of layoffs in the American economy ===
Layoffs create lower job security overall, and an increased competitiveness for available and opening positions. Layoffs have generally two major effects on the economy and stockholders. The way layoffs affect the economy varies from the industry that is doing the layoffs and the size of the layoff. If an industry that employs a majority of a region (freight in the northeast for example) suffers and has to lay employees off, there will be mass unemployment in an economically rich area. This can have leave ripple effects nationwide. Unemployment is the biggest effect on the economy that can come from layoffs.

== Around the world ==
In francophone Belgium, the term Procédure Renault has become a synonym for the consultation process leading to mass redundancies, due to a controversial mass layoff and resultant legislation in the late 1990s.

When an employee has been laid off in Australia their employer has to give them redundancy pay, which is also known as severance pay. The only time that a redundancy payment doesn't have to be paid is if an employee is casual, working for a small business or has worked for a business for less than twelve months. The redundancy compensation payment for employees depends on the length of time an employee has worked for an employer which excludes unpaid leave. If an employer can't afford the redundancy payment they are supposed to give their employee, once making them redundant, or they find their employee another job that is suitable for the employee. An employer is able to apply for a reduction in the amount of money they have to pay the employee they have made redundant. An employer can do this by applying to the Fair Work Commission for a redundancy payment reduction.

A layoff is also known as a retrenchment in (South African English). In the UK, permanent termination due to elimination of a position is usually called redundancy. Certain countries (such as Belgium, Netherlands, Portugal, Spain, Italy, France and Germany), distinguish between leaving the company of one's own free will, in which case the person is not entitled to unemployment benefits, but may receive a onetime payment and leaving a company as part of a reduction in labour force size, in which case the person is entitled to them. A RIF reduces the number of positions, rather than laying off specific people, and is usually accompanied by internal redeployment.

== Mass layoff ==
=== United States ===
The Worker Adjustment and Retraining Notification Act (WARN) requires an employer "to provide at least 60 calendar days advance written notice of a plant closing and mass layoff affecting 50 or more employees".

=== China ===
During the 1990s, China experienced a wave of mass layoffs associated with the restructuring of the its state-owned enterprises. This process became widely known as "xiagang" (下岗), referring to workers who were removed from their posts, often without the immediate formal termination of their employment relationships.

China's legal system focuses heavily on advance process and worker participation. Congress passed China's Employment Contracts Act in 2007 to provide a specific mass layoff procedure aimed at ensuring transparency, consultation, and regulatory oversight before any mass layoffs proceed. It requires an employer to explain current business conditions to the labor union or all employees at least 30 days in advance, prepare a layoff plan with a list of all employees to be laid off, the timeline, specific layoff process, and legally required severance, and solicit labor union or employee opinions. The plan must then be submitted and approved by the local labor regulator, with the employer required to incorporate any labor regulator recommendations into a revised plan. In addition to rulemaking and recommendation authority, the congressional act delegates authority to labor regulators to order employers to cease and correct violations, and labor unions are empowered to require employers reconsider any layoffs that violate applicable laws, regulations, or collective bargaining contracts.

== See also ==
- Bureau of Labor Statistics
- Bullshit Jobs
- Compromise agreement
- Displaced workers
- Furlough
- Global labor arbitrage
- Offshoring
- Outsourcing
- Pseudowork
- Replacement migration
- Restructuring
- Retraining
- Retrenchment
- Severance package
- Termination of employment
- Trade Adjustment Assistance
- Unemployment
- Voluntary redundancy
- WARN Act
- Work sharing
