= Wallace v United Grain Growers Ltd =

- Supreme Court of Canada

Hearing: 22 May 1997 Judgment: 30 October 1997
- Full case name: Jack Wallace v United Grain Growers Limited
- Citations: 1997 CanLII 332 (SCC), [1997] 3 SCR 701
- Docket No.: 24986
- Prior history: APPEAL and CROSS‑APPEAL from Wallace v. United Grain Growers Ltd., 1995 CanLII 6262 (8 September 1995), Court of Appeal (Manitoba, Canada), allowing the appeal and cross‑appeal from Wallace v. United Grain Growers Ltd., 1993 CanLII 4411 (7 July 1993), Court of Queen's Bench (Manitoba, Canada)
- Ruling: Appeal allowed in part, La Forest, L'Heureux‑Dubé and McLachlin JJ. dissenting in part. Cross‑appeal dismissed.

Holding
- An undischarged bankrupt has capacity to sue for wrongful dismissal, as such damages constitute wages that are exempt from vesting in a trustee in bankruptcy under the Bankruptcy Act. Bad faith conduct in the manner of dismissal is another factor that is properly compensated for by an addition to what may be considered reasonable notice.

Court membership
- Chief Justice: Antonio Lamer; Puisne Justices: Gérard La Forest, Claire L'Heureux-Dubé, John Sopinka, Charles Gonthier, Peter Cory, Beverley McLachlin, Frank Iacobucci, John C. Major

Reasons given
- Majority: Iacobucci J, joined by Lamer CJ and Sopinka, Gonthier, Cory and Major JJ
- Concur/dissent: McLachlin J, joined by La Forest and L'Heureux-Dubé JJ

Laws applied
- Bankruptcy Act
- Superseded by
- Honda Canada Inc v Keays

Wallace v United Grain Growers Ltd, 1997 CanLII 332, [1997] 3 SCR 701 is a leading decision of the Supreme Court of Canada in the area of Canadian employment law, particularly in determining damages arising from claims concerning wrongful dismissal.

== Background ==
In 1972, Public Press (a subsidiary of United Grain Growers) (Note: subsequently amalgamated with UGG in the late 1970s, Public Press was sold to a third party in 1991) expanded its activities in commercial printing through acquisition of a web press, and hired Wallace, who had experience in selling such products. As Wallace was 46, he sought and received assurances that he would be treated fairly and have a guarantee of security in employment until at least his 65th birthday.

Wallace was the company's top salesperson throughout his employment, which was terminated in 1986 without explanation. In a letter issued after termination, UGG claimed that "the main reason for his termination was his inability to perform his duties satisfactorily." The termination and allegation caused great emotional distress for Wallace, and he was unable to find similar employment elsewhere. Prior to his termination, Wallace had filed for bankruptcy in 1985, from which he was discharged in 1988.

He sued UGG for wrongful dismissal, claiming:

- loss of income, including salary and commissions which would have been earned during the unexpired term of a fixed-term contract, or alternatively,
- such amounts that would have been earned under a period of reasonable notice, plus
- damages for mental distress or aggravated damages, punitive or exemplary damages and special damages.

In its defense, UGG asserted:

- the dismissal was for cause (which was withdrawn on the opening day of the trial),
- the employment was not for a fixed term, and
- the claim with respect to mental distress was barred under Manitoba law relating to limitation of actions, as the description of its nature was inserted as an amendment made out of time.

== The courts below ==
=== Court of Queen's Bench ===
At the initial hearing, Lockwood J held that, as Wallace was an undischarged bankrupt, he had no capacity to commence an action on his own. His appeal to the Manitoba Court of Appeal was stayed pending completion of the trial, which was resumed subject to the outcome of the appeal on the bankruptcy issue.

In his resulting judgment, Lockwood J found that, subject to the above:

- the contract was not in the nature of a fixed term, as such a variation in company policy required the approval of the general manager, the president or the head of human resources
- in this case, a reasonable notice period for Wallace would be 24 months, with damages calculated accordingly,
- claims for mental distress were made both in contract and in tort,
- the restatement of the claim for mental distress was not made out of time, as it was a clarification made in consequence of Vorvis, and
- UGG's conduct was not sufficiently reprehensible to warrant an award of punitive damages.

Accordingly, he awarded damages of $157,700 for wrongful dismissal and $15,000 as aggravated damages for mental distress.

=== Manitoba Court of Appeal ===
The Court allowed an appeal and cross-appeal. In his ruling Scott CJM held that:

- Wallace had capacity to sue in the matter, not on the basis that wages are exempt from property that vests in the trustee under Canadian bankruptcy law, (Note: the authorities against Wallace's position were considered to be more convincing, holding that an action for wrongful dismissal is for damages for breach of contract, not for promised remuneration) but on the principle that property acquired after the date of bankruptcy does not automatically vest in the trustee in such a way as to prevent the bankrupt from maintaining an action. (Note: relying on Cohen v. Mitchell, (1890), 25 QBD 262)
- 15 months was a more reasonable period of notice, as 24 months was indicative of an element of aggravated damages having crept into the trial judge's determination, and
- aggravated damages did not apply. as Vorvis held that any damages beyond compensation for breach of contract for failure to give reasonable notice "must be founded on a separately actionable course of conduct."

Wallace appealed the ruling to the Supreme Court of Canada as to whether:

1. a fixed-term contract existed,
2. the Court of Appeal erred in overturning the award for aggravated damages,
3. the appellant can sue in either contract or tort for "bad faith discharge",
4. the appellant was entitled to punitive damages, and
5. the Court of Appeal erred in reducing the appellant's reasonable notice damages from 24 to 15 months.

UGG cross-appealed as to whether an undischarged bankrupt had capacity to sue in this matter.

== At the Supreme Court of Canada ==
In a 6–3 decision, the appeal was allowed. The Court unanimously dismissed the cross-appeal.

=== Cross-appeal ===
In contrast to the facts in Cohen, Wallace did not become involved in any good-faith transactions for value with a third party after his assignment in bankruptcy. (Note: a proposition endorsed in Re Pascoe, [1944] 1 Ch 219 (CA)) Iacobucci J described damages arising from wrongful dismissal as forming part of the wages exemption under the Bankruptcy Act, stating:

65. As I see the matter, the underlying nature of the damages awarded in a wrongful dismissal action is clearly akin to the "wages" referred to in s. 68(1). In the absence of just cause, an employer remains free to dismiss an employee at any time provided that reasonable notice of the termination is given. In providing the employee with reasonable notice, the employer has two options: either to require the employee to continue working for the duration of that period or to give the employee pay in lieu of notice.... There can be no doubt that if the employer opted to require the employee to continue working during the notice period, his or her earnings during this time would constitute wages or salary under s. 68(1) of the Act. The only difference between these earnings and pay in lieu of notice is that the employee receives a lump sum payment instead of having that sum spread out over the course of the notice period. The nature of those funds remains the same and thus s. 68(1) will also apply in these circumstances.

=== Majority ruling in the appeal ===
In the appeal, Iacobucci J declared:

- the courts below did not err in holding that a fixed-term contract did not exist,
- where the manner of dismissal has caused mental distress but falls short of an independent actionable wrong, the trial judge has discretion to extend the period of reasonable notice to which an employee is entitled,
- an employee cannot sue in either tort or contract for "bad faith discharge", as the law does not recognize any requirement for good faith or fair dealing,
- there is no foundation for an award of punitive damages, as UGG did not engage in sufficiently "harsh, vindictive, reprehensible and malicious" conduct for that to arise, and
- the trial judge's award of 24 months was reasonable, as bad faith conduct in the manner of dismissal is another factor that is properly compensated for by an addition to the notice period.

In expanding on the last point, he stated:

98. The obligation of good faith and fair dealing is incapable of precise definition. However, at a minimum, I believe that in the course of dismissal employers ought to be candid, reasonable, honest and forthright with their employees and should refrain from engaging in conduct that is unfair or is in bad faith by being, for example, untruthful, misleading or unduly insensitive....

=== Dissent in the appeal ===
While agreeing with the majority in most respects, McLachlin J (as she then was) differed on two points:

1. An award of damages for wrongful dismissal should be confined to factors relevant to the prospect of finding replacement employment. It follows that the notice period upon which such damages are based should only be increased for manner of dismissal if this impacts on the employee's prospects of re-employment.
2. The law has evolved to permit recognition of an implied duty of good faith in termination of the employment.

As a result, in addition to restoring damages for reasonable notice to 24 months, she would have also restored the award for aggravated damages. She explained her reasoning thus:

119. I prefer the second approach for the following reasons. First, this solution seems to me more consistent with the nature of the action for wrongful dismissal. Second, this approach, unlike the alternative, honours the principle that damages must be grounded in a cause of action. Third, this approach seems to me more consistent with the authorities, notably Vorvis v. Insurance Corporation of British Columbia... Fourth, this approach will better aid certainty and predictability in the law governing damages for termination of employment. Finally, there are other equally effective ways to remedy wrongs related to the manner of dismissal which do not affect the prospect of finding replacement work.

== Impact ==
The increase in reasonable notice that was suggested by the SCC came to be known as the "Wallace bump," and claims that included it became so frequent that the courts began to criticize the practice. It was subsequently restricted by the Court in Honda Canada Inc. v. Keays (Note: Honda Canada Inc. v. Keays, 2008 SCC 39 at par. 49–61, [2008] 2 SCR 362 (27 June 2008), as a consequence of Fidler v. Sun Life Assurance Co. of Canada, 2006 SCC 30, [2006] 2 SCR 3 (29 June 2006), which applied principles first expressed in Hadley v Baxendale, (1854) 9 Ex 341, 156 ER 145) to the following circumstances:

- where damages are awarded for the conduct of the termination, they should not be awarded by extending the notice period,
- all damages arising out of the manner of dismissal should be recoverable if they arise from the circumstances set out in Wallace, but
- the damages awarded must reflect the actual damages sustained and not be an arbitrary extension of the notice period,
- damages for mental distress will be available, as long as they arise naturally from the contract breach and the manner of dismissal, and
- an independent actionable wrong will not give rise to punitive damages, as they will only arise where conduct is harsh, vindictive, reprehensible, malicious and extreme in nature.

Most lawyers consider Wallace not to be dead, but to have evolved, and others point out that Keays damages may result in higher monetary awards in certain circumstances.

Subsequent jurisprudence has identified several key areas where an employer's conduct will constitute bad faith that will attract Wallace damages:

1. Making false accusations,
2. Damaging the employee's prospects of finding another job,
3. Misrepresenting the reasons for termination,
4. Firing the employee to ensure deprivation of a benefit, and
5. Firing the employee in front of coworkers.

== Sources ==
- Anne Côté (Fall 2008). "Honda Canada v. Keays at the SCC: Re-thinking compensation for the manner of dismissal" (PDF). Field LLP.
- Nancy M. Shapiro; Aaron Hart (April 2010). "Vorvis, Wallace and Keays: Is Wallace dead?" (PDF). Koskie Minsky LLP. Archived from the original (PDF) on 2013-12-04.
