= Employee handbook =

Handbook relating to the company and job given by the employer to the employee

An employee handbook, sometimes also known as an employee manual, staff handbook, or company policy manual, is a book given to employees by an employer.

The employee handbook can be used to bring together employment and job-related information which employees need to know. It typically has three types of content:

1. Cultural: A welcome statement, the company's mission or purpose, company values, and more.
2. General Information: holiday arrangements, company perks, policies not required by law, policy summaries, and more.
3. Case-Specific: company policies, rules, disciplinary and grievance procedures, and other information modeled after employment laws or regulations.

The employee handbook, if one exists, is almost always a part of a company's onboarding or induction process for new staff. A written employee handbook gives clear advice to employees and creates a culture where issues are dealt with fairly and consistently.

== Content ==
While it often varies from business to business, specific areas that an employee handbook may address include:

- A welcome statement, which may also briefly describe the company's history, reasons for its success and how the employee can contribute to future successes.
- Cultural information, such as a mission, vision, or purpose statement, information about organizational values, historical information about the company, and/or a statement about a business' goals and objectives.
- Orientation procedures. This usually involves providing a human resources manager or other designated employee completed income tax withholding forms, providing proof of identity and eligibility for employment (in accordance with the U.S. Immigration Reform and Control Act of 1986), proof of a completed drug test (by a designated medical center) and other required forms.
- Definitions of full- and part-time employment, and benefits each classification receives. In addition, this area also describes timekeeping procedures (such as defining a "work week"). This area may also include information about daily breaks (for lunch and rest).
- Information about employee pay and benefits (such as vacation and insurance). Usually, new employees are awarded some benefits, plus additional rewards (such as enrollment in a 401(k) retirement account program, additional vacation and pay raises) after having worked for a company for a certain period of time. These are spelled out in this section.
- Guidelines and procedures for travel and expenses (T&E).
- Information about different types of leave, including holidays, paid time off (PTO), sick time, personal leave, military leave, bereavement, and voting leave. If the employer is covered by the U.S. Family and Medical Leave Act of 1993 - generally 50 or more employees - a handbook usually contains information about FMLA and often includes specific policies for parental and medical leave.
- Expectations about conduct and discipline policies. These sections include conduct policies for such areas as sexual harassment, alcohol and drug use, and attendance; plus, grounds for dismissal (i.e., getting fired, laid off) and due process. This area may also include information about filing grievances with supervisors and/or co-workers, and communicating work-related issues with supervisors and/or company managers.
- Guidelines for employee performance reviews (such as how and when they are conducted).
- Policies for promotion, transfers, or demotion to a certain position.
- Rules concerning mail; use of the telephone, company equipment, Internet and e-mail; and employee use of motor vehicles for job assignments.
- Procedures on handling on-the-job accidents, such as those that result in injury.
- How an employee may voluntarily terminate his/her job (through retirement or resignation), and exit interviews.
- A requirement that employees keep certain business information confidential. This area usually includes information about releasing employee records and information, as well as who may retrieve and inspect the information.

Revisions to an employee handbook vary from company to company. At many larger companies, a revised handbook comes out annually or at other regular intervals. It is recommended that handbooks be updated regularly as laws and regulations change.

== Acknowledgement of receipt form ==
New employees are often required to sign an acknowledgement form stating they have received, read and understand the information within the employee handbook and accept its terms.

Acknowledgement forms typically have additional content:

- A disclaimer that the handbook is not a contract or other employment agreement.
- A statement that the handbook may change over time with or without notice and the employee agrees to these changes. This is an attempt by employers to protect themselves from liability if a policy changes and the employee is not explicitly notified about the change.
- In the US, at-will employers will also typically state the fact that employment is at-will and the employment relationship may be terminated at any time for any reason with or without cause.

Failure of an employee to sign the acknowledgement form within a timely manner may prevent them from being hired or may result in termination.

== Culture-first employee handbooks ==
In 2009, Netflix publicly released a presentation entitled Netflix Culture: Freedom & Responsibility that described their movement away from a company culture based on command and control and towards one centered around freedom and responsibility. The presentation went viral and as of March 2018 had over 17 million views.

Because the presentation also discusses other common company policies, it is often referred to as Netflix's employee handbook. It has been very influential, with many companies copying their "unlimited" vacation policy and their simple "Act in Netflix’s best interests" expenses policy.

Alongside the Valve Handbook for New Employees and the Zappos Culture Book, the presentation has influenced many companies to create culture-first employee handbooks that highlight their company culture instead of or before policies that would be found in a traditional employee handbook. Even the policies are rewritten in a much different way than tradition would dictate, or include informal summaries or introductions in plain language.

== Need for employee handbook ==
Federal and state laws and the growing number of cases of employee-related litigation against management strongly suggests that a written statement of company policy is a business necessity for firms of any size.

For example, the United States Equal Employment Opportunity Commission reported that in 2005, companies paid out more than $378 million in discrimination non-litigated settlements. In 2014, the EEOC received a total of 88,778 discrimination charges filed against private businesses.

Other examples of litigation against a company stemming from employee actions are the release of a customer's private information and, of course, the actions of one employee against another; sexual harassment being one type of offensive employee conduct.

That said, some legal counsels recommend very small companies (less than 10 or 15 employees) to not have a handbook at all because most very small companies find it difficult to dedicate time or resources to maintaining an up-to-date employee handbook. It may be less risky for very small companies to not have documented policies at all rather than having misleading, out-of-date, or incomplete policies. However, others have maintained that there are benefits to small organizations, such as some NGOs, to maintain a quality policy manual for staff.

One of the most important aspects of any employee handbook is that the handbook is kept current as laws change. If a company chooses to publish its handbook in multiple languages, each version should be updated concurrently.

Employee handbooks play an important role in business operations by helping employers communicate workplace policies and procedures. They also provide employees with information about organizational expectations, workplace rules, and employment practices.

Employee handbooks should be reviewed by an attorney for consistency and compliance with current federal and state or provincial laws. As an example, many US states have specific laws that go above and beyond federal laws. Because of this, a New Mexico employee handbook should not be used in California. In the US, California is the state with the highest number of regulations that go above and beyond federal law. Companies operating there usually have special content for California employees. Other states that will typically require special content are New York, Massachusetts, Illinois, Connecticut, Washington DC, and Texas.

In the United Kingdom, the employee handbook may also form part of an employee's terms and conditions of employment. If five or more people are employed, it is a requirement of the Health and Safety at Work Act to have a written statement of the company's health and safety policy.

== See also ==
- Corporate Governance
- Human Resource Policies
