= Wrongful dismissal =

Termination of employment in breach of contract or relevant legal provisions

In law, wrongful dismissal, also called wrongful termination or wrongful discharge, is a situation in which an employee's contract of employment has been terminated by the employer, where the termination breaches one or more terms of the contract of employment, or a statute provision or rule in employment law. Laws governing wrongful dismissal vary according to the terms of the employment contract, as well as under the laws and public policies of the jurisdiction.

A related concept is constructive dismissal in which an employee feels no choice but to resign from employment for reasons that result from the employer's violation of the employee's legal rights.

== Forms ==
Being terminated for any of the items listed below may constitute wrongful termination:

- Discrimination: The employer cannot terminate employment because the employee is a certain race, nationality, religion, sex, age, or (in some jurisdictions) sexual orientation.
- Retaliation: An employer cannot fire an employee because the employee filed a claim of discrimination or is participating in an investigation for discrimination. In the US, this "retaliation" is forbidden under civil rights law.
- Reporting a violation of law to government authorities: also known as a whistleblower law, an employee who falls under whistleblower protections may not lawfully be fired for reporting an employer's legal violation or for similar activity that is protected by the law.
- Employee's refusal to commit an illegal act: An employer is not permitted to fire an employee because the employee refuses to commit an act that is illegal.
- Employer is not following the company's own termination procedures: In some cases, an employee handbook, company policy, or collective bargaining agreement outlines the procedure that must be followed before an employee is terminated. If the employer fires an employee without following required procedure, the employee may have a claim for wrongful termination.

The absence of a formal contract of employment does not preclude wrongful dismissal in jurisdictions in which a de facto contract is taken to exist by virtue of the employment relationship. Terms of such a contract may include obligations and rights outlined in an employee handbook.

Many jurisdictions provide tribunals or courts that hear actions for wrongful dismissal. Although available remedies are dependent upon the type of claim and the laws of the jurisdiction, potential remedies for a proved wrongful dismissal include:

- reinstatement of the dismissed employee;
- monetary compensation for the wrongfully dismissed.

== Probationary employees ==
One way to avoid potential liability for wrongful dismissal with newer employees is to institute an employment probation period after which a new employee is automatically terminated unless there is sufficient justification not to do so. The dismissed employee may still assert a claim, but proof will be more difficult, as the employer may have broad discretion with retaining such a temporary employee.

== United States ==
In the United States, there is no single "wrongful termination" law. Rather, there are several state and federal laws and court decisions that define this concept.

In all U.S. states except Montana, workers are considered by default to be at-will employees, meaning that they may be fired at any time without cause.

Some employees have contracts of employment that limit their employers' ability to terminate them without cause. Other employees may be members of unions and benefit from a collective bargaining agreement that defines disciplinary proceedings and limits when an employee may be terminated. Employees who work for government agencies normally benefit from civil service protections that restrict termination. Those employees, if terminated, may attempt to bring wrongful termination claims under the terms of the contract or agreement, or civil service law.

=== Termination of at-will employment ===
Although at-will employees are protected from termination by civil rights laws and other laws that prohibit retaliatory termination, in the absence of a contract of employment or collective bargaining agreement, or civil service protections extended to government workers, they have few protections from being fired.

In some situations an at-will employee may be able to claim wrongful termination. Three leading grounds for claiming wrongful termination are:

1. Implied contract: In some situations a court might find an implied contract of employment that restricts the employer's ability to terminate an employee without cause. For example, the terms of an employee manual may support an employee's claim that the employer must follow a defined disciplinary process prior to termination.
2. Public policy: In many states it is possible to argue that the employer's reasons for terminating an employee, although not in violation of a statute, violated the state's public policy such that a wrongful termination claim should be allowed. For example, a court might allow a claim by an employee who was fired for refusing to take an action that was in violation of the law, for reporting a violation of the law to an enforcement agency, or for otherwise exercising the employee's rights under the law.
3. Covenant of good faith and fair dealing: In what is in many senses an extension of public policy doctrine, some states allow an at-will employee to pursue a wrongful termination claim if the cause for the termination is deemed to reflect bad faith on the part of the employer. For example, a state might apply this doctrine to allow a claim against an employer that terminated an employee a week before that employee's pension benefits vested, for no reason other than to avoid paying the employee a pension.

=== Termination in violation of the law ===
In the United States, termination of employment is not legal if it is based on the worker's membership in a group protected from discrimination by law. It is unlawful for an employer to terminate an employee based upon factors including employee's race, religion, national origin, sex, disability, medical condition, pregnancy, or age (over 40), pursuant to U.S. federal laws such as Title VII of the Civil Rights Act of 1964, the Americans with Disabilities Act of 1990 and the Age Discrimination in Employment Act of 1967.

Many states also have civil rights laws that protect workers from discrimination. For example, those forms of discrimination are prohibited by the California’s Fair Employment and Housing Act (FEHA).

Many laws also prohibit termination, even of at-will employees. For example, whistleblower laws may protect an employee who reports a legal or safety violation by the employer to an appropriate oversight agency. Most states prohibit employers from firing employees in retaliation for filing a workers' compensation claim, or making a wage complaint over unpaid wages.

== Canada ==
In Canada, wrongful dismissal is based on two conditions: whether the worker was dismissed fairly, and whether the worker was adequately compensated.

When no written contract exists on how to end the employment relationship, the law implies that the relationship cannot end without "notice". Notice is advance warning an employer must provide an employee that their employment will be terminated. It is measured in units of time. There are two kinds of notice:

- Working notice
- Pay in lieu of notice

If an adjudicator determines a dismissal was unjust, the employer may be ordered to reinstate the employee with or without compensation for lost wages, pay compensation for lost wages without reinstating the employee, or do anything that is equitable to remedy any consequences of the dismissal.

=== Working notice ===
Working notice is legal in Canada. Therefore, if the employee is provided a reasonable amount of working notice, the employer owes the employee no additional money.

=== Pay in lieu of notice ===
Pay in lieu of notice, sometimes referred to as termination pay, is the amount of money the employer must pay the employee if the employer seeks to immediately terminate the employee without working notice.

=== Statutory notice and common law "reasonable notice" ===
Notice is measured in two different ways: statutory notice and common law "reasonable notice". Employees may be entitled to either statutory or reasonable notice, which ever is greater, but at the very minimum, must receive statutory notice. Provincial legislation such as Ontario's Employment Standards Act, delineates statutory notice by way of a formula.

Common law reasonable notice refers to the notice period that an employer must give to an employee when terminating their employment without cause. This period is designed to provide the employee with sufficient time to secure new employment and mitigate the impact of the job loss on their livelihood.

The common law dictates how much reasonable notice an employee is entitled to. In this regard, the length of reasonable notice depends on a number of factors, best described by McRuer CJHC in the 1960 Ontario decision of Bardal v Globe & Mail:

There could be no catalogue laid down as to what was reasonable notice in particular classes of cases. The reasonableness of the notice must be decided with reference to each particular case, having regard to the character of the employment, the length of the service of the servant, the age of the servant and the availability of similar employment, having regard to the experience, training and qualifications of the servant.

As the so-called "Bardal Factors" feature in hundreds of cases, predictive modeling is now possible. Notwithstanding the above, the courts are open to creative interpretations of reasonable notice. For example, if an employee was persuaded to leave a job to come to another (i.e. inducement), the courts may take that into account in calculating the employee's length of service and thus drastically increase the notice period.

The Supreme Court of Canada has significantly expanded the scope of wrongful dismissal in Canadian jurisprudence:

- Wallace v United Grain Growers Ltd holds that extra damages will be recoverable when an employer handles a termination in circumstances that constitute bad faith;
- Honda Canada Inc v Keays incorporated Hadley v Baxendale into Canadian employment law, as well as holding that awards are not affected by the type of position an employee may have had;
- Seneca College v Bhadauria holds that human rights violations do not constitute independent actionable wrongs in wrongful dismissal cases, and they must be pursued through the separate schemes provided under human rights legislation.
- Wilson v Atomic Energy of Canada Ltd provides that, where a jurisdiction provides a remedy for terminations arising from unjust dismissal, it cannot be displaced through severance packages (with connected releases) provided by an employer.

An employer is entitled to dismiss an employee according to the terms of the employment contract. There are oral employment contracts, and written employment contracts, and combinations of oral and written employment contracts. In Canadian common law, there is a basic distinction as to dismissals. There are two basic types of dismissals, or terminations: dismissal with cause and termination without cause. An example of cause would be an employee's behavior which constitutes a fundamental breach of the terms of the employment contract. Where cause exists, the employer can dismiss the employee without providing any notice. If no cause exists yet the employer dismisses without providing lawful notice, then the dismissal is a wrongful dismissal. A wrongful dismissal will allow the employee to claim monetary damages in an amount that compensates the employee for the wages, commissions, bonuses, profit sharing and other such emoluments the employee would have earned or received during the lawful notice period, minus earnings from new employment obtained during the lawful notice period. In Canadian employment law, in those jurisdictions where a remedy for unjust dismissal is not available, it has long been the rule that reinstatement is not a remedy available to either the employer or the employee—damages must be paid instead.

Although Canadian employment law provides some of the above remedies, each (provincial) jurisdiction may treat employment law differently. It is important to determine which jurisdiction the employment occurs in or is regulated by, then seek appropriate legal advice relevant to that jurisdiction and its particular employment laws.

== United Kingdom ==
In United Kingdom law, the concept of wrongful dismissal refers exclusively to dismissal contrary to the contract of employment, which effectively means premature termination, either due to insufficient notice or lack of grounds. Although wrongful dismissal is usually associated with lack of notice sometimes it can also be caused by arbitrary dismissal where no notice was required but certain grounds were specified in the contract as being the only ones available but none existed.

== See also ==
- Constructive dismissal
- Unfair dismissal
- Severance package
