= Seneca College v Bhadauria =

- Supreme Court of Canada

Hearing: May 12–13, 1981 Judgment: June 22, 1981
- Citations: [1981] 2 SCR 181
- Ruling: Appeal allowed.

Court membership
- Chief Justice: Bora Laskin; Puisne Justices: Ronald Martland, Roland Ritchie, Brian Dickson, Jean Beetz, Willard Estey, William McIntyre, Julien Chouinard, Antonio Lamer

Reasons given
- Unanimous reasons by: Laskin CJ
- Martland and Ritchie JJ took no part in the consideration or decision of the case.

Seneca College v Bhadauria, [1981] 2 SCR 181 is a leading decision of the Supreme Court of Canada on civil rights and tort law. The Court ruled that there can be no common law tort of discrimination.

== Background ==
Bhadauria, an East Indian woman, was qualified to teach in Ontario and had seven years experience. She had applied ten times to Seneca College but was never granted an interview. Bhadauria claimed that she was not interviewed because of her ethnicity.

She argued that the college had violated the common law tort of discrimination. The Court of Appeal for Ontario accepted the existence of such a tort. Since Bhadauria could show that such a right existed and that it had been violated by the practices of the college she would be entitled to remedy.

== Decision of the Supreme Court of Canada ==
The Court allowed the appeal. It held that there was no tort of discrimination in Canadian common law. The court reasoned that a tort of discrimination was unnecessary since Bhadauria already had access to the human rights regime.

Furthermore, because the Canadian Charter of Rights and Freedoms had not yet come into effect in 1981, Bhadauria could not bring a section 15 equality rights claim. At that time, the only legal avenue available to her was to sue in tort for racial discrimination in hiring, in hopes of achieving a more meaningful remedy. The outcome of the case effectively closed off civil recourse for victims of racism and other forms of discrimination, and it reduced defendants’ potential liability, as human rights tribunals were limited in their remedial powers compared to the courts.
