= Unfair dismissal =

Factor in employment relations

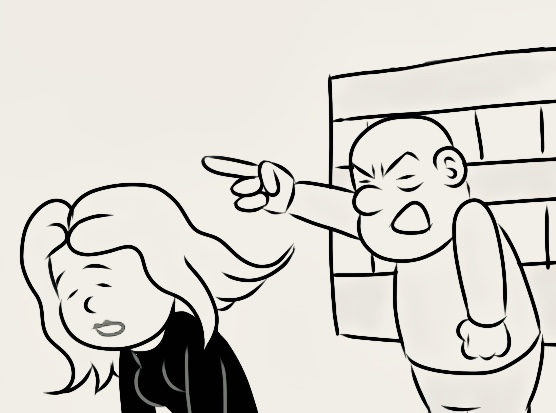
Layoff Cartoon

In labour law, unfair dismissal is an act of employment termination made without good reason or contrary to the country's specific legislation.

== Situation per country ==
=== Australia ===
Australia has long-standing protection for employees in relation to dismissal. Most of that protection was however confined in one of two ways. An employer could not dismiss an employee for a prohibited reason, most typically membership of a union. An individual however could not challenge their own dismissal as being unfair and instead had to rely upon a union challenging the fairness of the dismissal. This remedy however was generally only available in the state tribunals. A similar definition existed at the Commonwealth level, however it was considerably limited by the requirement under the Constitution to establish an inter-state dispute. The ability for an individual to seek relief from unfair dismissal was first established in a statutory scheme in South Australia in 1972, followed thereafter by Western Australia, Queensland, New South Wales and Victoria in the early 1990s.

Protection from unfair dismissal at the Commonwealth level was enhanced in 1984 by the Commonwealth Conciliation and Arbitration Commission with its ruling in the Termination, Change and Redundancy Case, that awards should contain a provision that dismissal "shall not be harsh, unjust or unreasonable" and subsequent awards following it were upheld by the High Court of Australia. The Parliament of Australia later extended the reach of protection from unfair dismissal with the passage of the Industrial Relations Reform Act 1993, which was based on the external affairs power and the ILO Termination of Employment Convention, 1982.

In current Australian law, unfair dismissal occurs where the Fair Work Commission, acting under section 385 of the Fair Work Act 2009, determines that:

1. a person has been dismissed;
2. the dismissal was harsh, unjust or unreasonable;
3. it was not consistent with the Small Business Fair Dismissal Code; and
4. it was not a case of genuine redundancy.

If the Fair Work Commission determines that a dismissal was unfair, the Commission must decide whether to order reinstatement or compensation. The commission is required to first consider whether reinstatement is appropriate and can only order compensation (capped at 6 months pay) if it is satisfied that reinstatement is inappropriate.

=== Canada ===
Labour law in Canada falls within both federal and provincial jurisdiction, depending on the sector affected. Complaints relating to unjust dismissal (French: congédiement injuste) (where "the employee has been dismissed and considers the dismissal to be unjust," which in certain cases also includes constructive dismissal) can be made under the Canada Labour Code, as well as similar provisions in effect in Quebec and Nova Scotia, all of which were introduced in the late 1970s.

Under the federal Code, non-unionized employees with more than twelve months of continuous employment, other than managers, have the ability to file complaints for unjust dismissal within 90 days of being so dismissed. In making the complaint, the employee has the right to "make a request in writing to the employer to provide a written statement giving the reasons for the dismissal," which must be supplied within 15 days of the request. Complaints are initially investigated by an inspector, who will then work towards a settlement within a reasonable time, failing which the Minister of Labour may refer the matter to an adjudicator in cases other than where "that person has been laid off because of lack of work or because of the discontinuance of a function" or "a procedure for redress has been provided elsewhere in or under this or any other Act of Parliament." Where the dismissal is determined to be unjust, the adjudicator has broad remedial authority, including ordering the payment of compensation and reinstatement to employment.

While many employers have attempted to contract out of these provisions through the payment of a severance package together with a signed release from pursuing any claims under the Code, the Supreme Court of Canada ruled in 2016 that the Code's provisions effectively ousted such common law remedies.

=== France ===
Unfair dismissal became part of French labour law in 1973, but certain other protections had been previously instituted as far back as 1892.

The Labour Code (French: Code du travail) governs the procedure under which dismissal (French: licenciement) (Note: the term congédiement is used in Canada, where licenciement only refers to a layoff) may occur, as well as specifying the grounds under which it is valid or not. Dismissal may occur on grounds of personal performance (French: motif personnel) or economic reasons (French: motif économique).

Where the employer believes that there is a valid reason (French: cause réelle et sérieuse) for dismissal on personal grounds, it must give five working days' notice to the employee that a meeting with him must take place, and a decision to dismiss (exercised in writing, sent by registered mail) can only be made not less than two days afterwards.

Where dismissal occurs on economic grounds, the employee has the right to be notified of the employer's obligation during the following 12 months to inform him of any position that becomes available that calls for his qualifications. Failure to give prior notice, as well as failure to advise of any open position, will be causes for unfair dismissal.

An employee may challenge a dismissal by making a complaint to the Labour Court (French: Conseil de prud'hommes).

Where an employee has at least two years' service, the employer faces several claims:

- Failure to follow procedural requirements may result in compensation of one month's pay being awarded to the employee.
- Where unfair dismissal (French: licenciement sans cause réelle et sérieuse) has been determined to have occurred, the Court may order reinstatement of employment (French: réintegration). If either party refuses to accept that remedy, compensation of not less than six months' pay will be awarded instead The employer will also be ordered to repay any unemployment benefits the employee may have received, to a maximum of six months' paid.

Where unfair dismissal occurs because of the failure to observe the notification obligations for recall rights, the court may award:

- where the employee has at least two years' service and the workforce consists of at least 11 workers, a minimum of two months' pay
- in all other cases, an amount in line with the existence and extent of any detriment the employee faced.

Where an employee has less than two years' service, or where the workforce has fewer than 11 employees, recall rights are not available, as well as the normal remedies for unfair dismissal. The remedy of one month's pay is still available in cases involving failure to follow procedural requirements, and an appropriate amount of compensation may still be ordered in cases where dismissal was improperly executed (French: licenciement abusif).

Where an employee has had at least one year's service, the employer also faces a separate claim for severance pay (French: indemnité de licenciement). The amount is equal to 20% of the base monthly pay times the number of years' service up to 10 years, plus 2/15 of base monthly pay times the number of years' service greater than 10 years.

=== Namibia ===
Unfair dismissal in Namibia is defined by the Labour Act, 2007, under which the employer has the burden of the proof that a dismissal was fair. Explicitly listed as cases or unfair dismissal are those due to discrimination in terms of race, religion, political opinion, marital or socio-economic status, as well as dismissals that arise from trade union activities. Any termination of employment that does not give any valid and fair reason is automatically assumed unfair.

=== Poland ===
Rules and grounds of employment termination in Poland are regulated in the Labor Code of Poland.

Unjustified dismissal of an employee includes:

- failure to comply with the appropriate form of termination notice,
- failure to inform the employee of the legal remedies available to him in this situation,
- shortening the notice period,
- dismissing a person covered by special protection against dismissal,
- dismissing without justified reason.

Each employee has a right to file an appeal against termination to the Court. Available remedies are:

- reinstatement to work under the previous conditions or
- on the compensation to be paid by the former employer.

The amount of compensation depends on since then, the employee has been unemployed for a long time. The employee is entitled to compensation in the amount of remuneration for the period from 2 weeks to 3 months, not lower than he would receive if he worked during the notice period. If the employee has returned to work, the employer will have to pay him compensation for the period of unemployment. As in the above case, it amounts to the sum of remuneration for the period from 2 weeks to 3 months, not lower than he would have earned while working on notice. The amount of compensation of the protected persons is especially due for the entire period of unemployment – these are pregnant women, trade union members, persons in the protected period due to age.

=== United Kingdom ===
After the release of the Donovan Report in 1968, the British Parliament passed the Industrial Relations Act 1971 which introduced the concept of unfair dismissal into UK law and its enforcement by the National Industrial Relations Court. The Trade Union and Labour Relations Act 1974 abolished the court and replaced it with a network of industrial tribunals (later renamed employment tribunals). The scheme is currently governed by Part X of the Employment Rights Act 1996.

Employees have the right not to be unfairly dismissed (with the exception of a number of exclusions). Following discussions with an employer, an employee can agree not to pursue a claim for unfair dismissal if they reach a settlement agreement (historically a compromise agreement). For a settlement agreement to be binding the employee must have taken advice as to the effect of the agreement from a relevant independent adviser, that is a qualified lawyer; a Trade Union certified and authorised officer, official, employee or member; or a certified advice centre worker.

In 2011, Aikens LJ summarized the jurisprudence on what constitutes an unfair dismissal:

1. The reason for the dismissal of an employee is a set of facts known to an employer, or it may be a set of beliefs held by him, which causes him to dismiss an employee.
2. An employer cannot rely on facts of which he did not know at the time of the dismissal of an employee to establish that the "real reason" for dismissing the employee was one of those set out in the statute or was of a kind that justified the dismissal of the employee holding the position he did.
3. Once the employer has established before a tribunal that the "real reason" for dismissing the employee is one within s. 98(1)(b), i.e. that it was a "valid reason", the Employment Tribunal has to decide whether the dismissal was fair or unfair. That requires, first and foremost, the application of the statutory test set out in s. 98(4)(a).
4. In applying that sub-section, the tribunal must decide on the reasonableness of the employer's decision to dismiss for the "real reason". That involves a consideration, at least in misconduct cases, of three aspects of the employer's conduct. First, did the employer carry out an investigation into the matter that was reasonable in the circumstances of the case; secondly, did the employer believe that the employee was guilty of the misconduct complained of and, thirdly, did the employer have reasonable grounds for that belief. If the answer to each of those questions is "yes", the tribunal must then decide on the reasonableness of the response of the employer.
5. In doing the exercise set out above, the tribunal must consider, by the objective standards of the hypothetical reasonable employer, rather than by reference to its own subjective views, whether the employer has acted within a "band or range of reasonable responses" to the particular misconduct found of the particular employee. If it has, then the employer's decision to dismiss will be reasonable. But that is not the same thing as saying that a decision of an employer to dismiss will only be regarded as unreasonable if it is shown to be perverse.
6. The tribunal must not simply consider whether they think that the dismissal was fair and thereby substitute their decision as to what was the right course to adopt for that of the employer. It must determine whether the decision of the employer to dismiss the employee fell within the band of reasonable responses which "a reasonable employer might have adopted".
7. A tribunal may not substitute its own evaluation of a witness for that of the employer at the time of its investigation and dismissal, save in exceptional circumstances.
8. A tribunal must focus its attention on the fairness of the conduct of the employer at the time of the investigation and dismissal (or any appeal process) and not on whether in fact the employee has suffered an injustice.

== See also ==
- Wrongful dismissal
