= Fixed-term employment contract =

Type of employment contract

A fixed-term contract is a contractual relationship between an employee and an employer which lasts for a specified period that is determined in advance. These contracts are usually regulated by countries' labor laws, to ensure that employers still fulfill basic labour rights regardless of a contract's form, particularly unjust dismissal. Generally, fixed-term contracts will automatically be deemed to have created a permanent contract, subject to the employer's right to terminate employment on reasonable notice for a good reason. Among European nations, the incidence of fixed-term contracts ranges from 6% in the UK to 23% in Spain, with Germany, Italy and France between 13% and 16%.

== By country ==
Due to the potential job insecurity that multiple fixed-term contracts may cause, employment laws in many countries limit the circumstances and the way these contracts may be used. In countries where labour law is more restrictive (compensation/indemnity for dismissal), the differentiation between fixed-term and permanent contracts tends to be clearly set out in law. Where employment legislation is less protective for the employee there tends to be a lesser degree of differentiation between fixed and permanent contracts.

=== Belgium ===
There are two possibilities to contract successive fixed-term contracts:

1. Successive employment contracts with a maximum term of two years: a maximum of four successive fixed-term employment contracts, where the minimum duration of each contract is three months and the total duration of all the successive contracts is not longer than two years.
2. Successive employment contracts with a maximum term of three years: with the prior authorisation of the Belgian Federal Public Service Employment, Labour and Social Dialogue, successive fixed-term contracts can be concluded with a minimum duration of six months if the total duration of all the successive contracts do not exceed three years.

=== France ===
The maximum term is twenty four months and may be extended once only.

=== Germany ===
Fixed-term contracts may not be extended more than three times with a maximum total period of two years.

=== Ghana ===
The Labour Act 2003 recognises fixed term contracts, but many labour disputes addressed by Ghana's National Labour Commission have related to issues around their implementation, termination, or renewal.

=== India ===
India has allowed fixed term employment since 2015. Fixed-term employees are entitled to wage and benefits on par with permanent employees.

=== Luxembourg ===
In Luxembourg, the standard maximum length of a contrat de travail à durée déterminée (CDD) is twenty-four months, with up to two renewals allowed. Researchers and students can employed for a maximum of sixty months on a CDD, with no restriction as to the number of renewals allowed. A waiting period of a minimum of one-third of the length of the contract is required for a CDD to be considered a new contract (and not a renewal) and to restart the maximum allowed duration of employment.

=== Saudi Arabia ===
Although both indefinite and fixed-term contracts exist in the country, foreign workers in Saudi Arabia must have a fixed-term contract; if the contract does not specify an end date, then the term automatically ends when the employee's work permit expires.

=== United Kingdom ===
Any employee on a fixed-term contract for four or more years will automatically become a permanent employee, unless the employer can show there is a good business reason not to allow this.

== See also ==
- Permanent employment
- Part-time
- Temporary work
