= Legal working age =

Minimum age required by law for a minor to work

Parties to the International Labour Organization's 1973 Minimum Age Convention 16 15 14

The legal working age is the minimum age required by law in each country or jurisdiction for a person to be allowed to work. Activities that are dangerous, harmful to the health or that may affect the morals or well-being of minors fall into this category.

== Africa ==
Country	Legal Working Age
Kenya	13: (Easy Work); 16: (Restricted working hours and the type of work); 18: (Unrestricted)
Nigeria	12: Light work with family 15: Up to industrial work 16: Unrestricted
South Africa	15: (Restricted working hours and the type of work); 18: (Unrestricted)
Egypt	14: (Restricted working hours and the type of work); 16: (Unrestricted)
Morocco	16: (easy work); 19: (Unrestricted)

== Americas ==
Country	State / region / province	Legal Working Age	Notes
Anguilla		12	
Antigua and Barbuda		14: (Restricted working hours); 18: (Unrestricted)	
Argentina		It is forbidden to employ workers under 18 years of age for arduous, unhealthy, or hazardous work. 14: The working week for young workers between 14 and 16 years of age should not be more than 3 hours per day and 15 hours per week, only in the mother's, father's or legal guardian's company. 16: Young workers aged over 16 but under 18, have the right to work during normal business hours 18: Unrestricted	
Aruba		14	
Bahamas		14: (Employment during school hours is prohibited; Night work is prohibited; Industrial work is prohibited; Conditions in respect of young persons: in a school day, for not more than three hours, in a school week, for not more than twenty-four hours, in a non-school day, for not more than eight hours, in a non-school week, for not more than forty hours.); 16: (Unrestricted)	
Barbados		16: (Employment during school hours is prohibited; Night work is prohibited; Industrial work is prohibited); 18: (Unrestricted)	
Belize		14	
Bermuda		13	
Bolivia		10: Independent work (e.g. street selling) with parent permission and government supervision 12: Contract work (for a boss) with parent permission and government supervision; no more than 6 hours per day, not during school hours, and if it does not interfere with schooling	
Brazil		In Brazil, any work for minors under 16 years of age is forbidden, except for apprentices, who can start working at 14 years old. Until the age of 18, it is strictly prohibited for the teenagers to work at night or in dangerous or unhealthy conditions. 14: Only apprentices can start working. It is forbidden to work in any other job. 16: Teenagers are allowed to work in any job, but they are prohibited to work at night or in dangerous or unhealthy conditions. 18: Unrestricted.	
British Virgin Islands		16	
Canada	Federal	Employment standards largely fall under provincial jurisdiction in Canada, with only around 7% of workers being subject to the Canada Labour Code. This includes workers in select federally regulated industries, like banking or telecommunications, as well as the federal public service. As such, the overwhelming majority of minor workers in Canada are under provincial protection. For the small segment of young workers in federally regulated industries, Section 10 of the Canada Labour Standards Regulations is the governing regime. It prohibits the employment of any minors subject to compulsory education under provincial law. An absolute bar on working in underground mines, handling explosives, or nuclear energy work also applies. Finally, there are general restrictions on employment that is likely to be "injurious to their health or to endanger their safety", and on working between 11PM and 6AM.	
Canada	Alberta	13: A permit from Employment Standards is generally needed. May not work more than 2 hours on a school day and 8 hours on a non-school day. May not work between 9:00 p.m. and 6:00 a.m. Parental consent is required.; 15: Can work in most fields, but special rules apply for workers in restaurants, bars, retail stores, gas stations, hotels and motels. No working from midnight to 6:00 a.m.; 18: Unrestricted	Regulatory Source: Occupational Health and Safety (OHS) legislation
Canada	British Columbia	12: May perform non-harmful work for family-owned businesses. May also work as camp assistant, assistant coach, referee or umpire.; 14: May perform "light work", such as cleaning, dishwashing, and stocking shelves. Parental consent is required and workers under 15 face further restrictions. Including not being able work more than 4 hours during a school day or 7 hours when school is not in session.; 16: Can work in most fields. Employment in hazardous industries is restricted.; 18: Unrestricted	Regulatory Source: Employment Standards Act
Canada	Manitoba	13: Can work with a permit from Employment Standards. No working from 11:00 p.m. to 6:00 a.m. Can not work more than 20 hours in a school week.; 16: Can work in most fields, but may not perform dangerous work. No working from 11:00 p.m. to 6:00 a.m.; 18: Unrestricted	Regulatory Source: The Employment Standards Code The Worker Recruitment and Protection Act
Canada	New Brunswick	None: New Brunswick does not have a minimum working age, but employers may not employ individuals under 16 in employment that is "unwholesome or harmful" to their health, welfare or moral or physical development. Additionally, some industry specific restrictions apply on workers under 14 (see below). Workers under 16 can work a maximum of 3 hours on a school day and a maximum 6 hours on a non-school day. Can not work from 10:00 p.m. to 6:00 a.m.; 14: Can work in industrial undertakings, forestry, construction, hotels and restaurants, automotive servicing, theatre and dance halls, shooting ranges, and as an elevator operator, but the "unwholesome or harmful" rule still applies. Hours restrictions still apply.; 16: Unrestricted	Regulatory Source: Employment Standards Act
Canada	Newfoundland and Labrador	14: Can generally work with written permission from parents. No dangerous work is permitted. Can not work more than 3 hours on a school days and 8 hours on a non-school day. May not work between 10 p.m. and 7 a.m.; 16: Unrestricted	Regulatory Source: The Labour Standards Act
Canada	Northwest Territories	None: There is no minimum work age is the Northwest territories but employment that is detrimental to the health, education or moral character of the children is not permitted. Children are not permitted to work between 11:00 p.m. to 6:00 a.m. without the approval of a Labour Standards Officer; 18: Unrestricted; 19: Serving or selling alcoholic beverages	Regulatory Source: Labour Standards Office
Canada	Nova Scotia	None: Nova Scotia does not have a minimum work age but dangerous work is not permitted for individuals under 16. Individuals under 14 can not work more than 3 hours on a school day or 8 hours on a non-school day. No working between 10 p.m. and 6 a.m. is permitted for workers under the age of 14.; 14: Can generally work like an adult but no dangerous work is permitted. And no work in mining, manufacturing, construction, forestry, garages and automobile service stations, hotels, pool rooms, billiard rooms, bowling alleys, or theatres is permitted.; 16: Unrestricted	Regulatory Source: Labour Standards Code General Labour Standards Code Regulations
Canada	Nunavut	None: There is no minimum age of work in Nunavut but employment may not be detrimental to the health, education or moral character of children. Children are not permitted to work between 11:00 p.m. to 6:00 a.m. without the approval of a Labour Standards Officer; 18: Unrestricted; 19: Serving or selling alcoholic beverages	Regulatory Source: Labour Standards Office
Canada	Ontario	14: Minimum work age for all industrial establishments not covered below, including offices, stores, arenas, and restaurant servicing areas. Note, since the minimum work age is set through occupational health regulations and not a de jure requirement, there is no minimum work age for work that happens outside a workplace, such as babysitting.; 15: Minimum work age for most "factories", including manufacturing and assembly plants, repair shops, restaurant kitchens, automotive service garages, grocery stores, laundries, and warehouses.; 16: Minimum work age for construction, mining plants or surface mines (but in not in their working face), and logging operations.; 18: Minimum age for work in an underground mine, the working face of surface mine, window cleaning, or on an offshore oil and gas rig.	Regulatory Source: Occupational Health and Safety Act
Canada	Prince Edward Island	None: There is no minimum age of work in Prince Edward Island, but no employer may employ a person under 16 in employment that is likely to be harmful to their health or safety, or moral or physical development. No employee under the age of 16 may work more than 3 hours on a school day or 8 hours on a non-school day (A weekly maximum of 40 hours also applies). No worker under the age of 16 may work between 11 p.m. and 7 a.m.; 16: Unrestricted	Regulatory Source: Youth Employment Act Employment Standards Act
Canada	Quebec	14: The general minimum age of work, though certain jobs such as babysitting and newspaper delivery are exempt with parental consent. Employees subject to compulsory education (through the age of 16) may not work more than 17 hours per week, including a maximum of 10 hours from Monday to Friday, and generally cannot work between 11PM and 6AM. Furthermore, as a general rule no person under 18 may be asked to do work that exceeds their abilities, or which might adversely affect their health or development.; 18: Unrestricted.	Regulatory Source: Employment Standards Act
Canada	Saskatchewan	14: May work with written permission of a parent or guardian. Cannot work after 10 p.m. on a day before a school day; Cannot work more than 16 hours during a week. Must have a certificate from the Young Worker Readiness Certificate Course.; 16: Minimum working age without parental permission. Minimum age to work in construction, pulp mills, sawmills or woodworking, smelters, foundries, refineries, metal processing or fabricating, a confined space, meat, fish or poultry processing, forestry or logging, oil drilling or servicing rigs, as an operator of powered mobile equipment, crane or hoist, where exposure to a chemical or biological substance is likely to endanger health or safety and power line construction or maintenance.; 18: Unrestricted. Minimum age to work in mining, as a radiation worker, an asbestos process, a silica process and any job requiring an atmosphere-supplying respirator; 19: Minimum age to sell, handle or serve alcohol.	Regulatory Source: The Labour Standards Act The Occupational Health and Safety Act The Alcohol and Gaming Regulation Act
Canada	Yukon	12: May work with parental consent as a delivery person for small items for retain stores, as a clerk or messenger in an office or retail store, as a delivery person for newspapers and flyers, and in the restaurant and food services industry. But the employment must not be injurious to the life, health, education, or welfare of the worker. A worker under 16 may not work more than 2 hours on a school day, or 8 hours on a non-school day, and may not work between 9 p.m. and 6:00 a.m.; 16: May work in most fields, but not in forestry, sawmills and pulp mills, underground mines, occupations involving the removal of asbestos, and in dangerous enclosed spaces. Generally cannot work from 12:01 a.m. to 6:00 a.m.; 18: Unrestricted	Regulatory Source: Employment Standards Act YOUNG WORKER PROTECTION ACT
Caribbean Netherlands		15	
Cayman Islands		15	
Chile		18: Unrestricted	
Costa Rica		16: By default	
Cuba		18: Unrestricted	
Curaçao		15	
Dominica		12: No person shall take into his employment or employ in any occupation whatsoever any child; but a child may be employed in the domestic work or agricultural work of a light nature at home by the parents or guardian of the child. 18: (Unrestricted)	
Dominican Republic		18: Unrestricted	
El Salvador		18: Unrestricted; Children below the age 14 are not allowed to enter the workforce. Minors between the ages of 14 and 18 may work with permission from the Ministry of Labor if their employment is indispensable to either themselves or their family.	
Greenland		15	
Grenada		16	
Guadeloupe		16	
Guatemala		18: Unrestricted	
Haiti		16: By default 18: Unrestricted	
Honduras		18: Unrestricted	
Jamaica		16: By default	
Martinique		16	
Mexico		15: Restricted working hours and the type of work 18: Unrestricted	
Montserrat		14	
Nicaragua		18: Unrestricted	
Panama		18: Unrestricted	
Peru		18: Unrestricted	
Puerto Rico		16: By default	
Saint Barthélemy		13	
Saint Kitts and Nevis		16	
Saint Lucia		15	
Saint Martin		16	
Saint Pierre and Miquelon		14	
Saint Vincent and the Grenadines		14	
Sint Maarten		16	
Trinidad and Tobago		16: By default	
Turks and Caicos Islands		Children younger than age 16 may be employed with the written consent of a parent or guardian.	
United States		12 in Illinois, 14 in North Dakota and Nevada Otherwise many at 16 and a few at 18.: Federal legal working age legislation / This list was incomplete.; Minimum Age Standards for nonagricultural Employment: None: deliver newspapers; perform in radio, television, movie, or theatrical productions; work in businesses owned by their parents (except in mining, manufacturing or hazardous jobs); and perform babysitting or perform minor chores around a private home.; 14: Minimum age for employment in specified occupations outside of school hours for limited periods of time each day and each week.; 16: Basic minimum age for employment. At 16 years of age, youth may be employed for unlimited hours in any occupation other than one declared to be hazardous by the Secretary of Labor.; 18: Minimum age for employment in nonagricultural occupations declared hazardous by the Secretary of Labor.; Occupation Standards: 14 Minimum age to work (in/as): Office and clerical Work; Work of an intellectual or artistically creative nature; Cooking (except for: cooking over an open flame, and using equipment such as rotisseries, broilers, pressurized equipment including fryolators, and cooking devices that operate at extremely high temperatures such as "Neico broilers." ); Cashiering, selling, modelling, art work, work in advertising departments, windows trimming and comparative shopping; Price marking, assembling orders, packing and shelving; Delivery work (only by foot, bicycle, and public transportation); Cleanup work; Kitchen work (and other work involved in preparing and serving food and beverages); Cleaning kitchen equipment; Cleaning vegetables and fruits, and wrapping, sealing, labeling, weighing pricing and stocking of items including vegetables, fruits and meat; Loading and unloading from motor vehicles; Lifeguard (But not at a natural environment such as an ocean side beach, lake, pond, river, quarry, or pier); Work in connection with cars and trucks; 16 Unrestricted for Nonagricultural Employment Minimum age to work (in/as): Manufactoring occupation; Mining occopation; Any occupation found and declared to be hazardous by the secretary of labour; Occupations involved with the operating, tending, setting up, adjusting, cleaning, oiling or repairing of hoisting apparatus; Workperformed in or about boiler or engine rooms or in connection with the maintenance or repair of the establishment, machines, or equipment; Occupations involved with the operating, tending, setting up, adjusting, cleaning, oiling or repairing or of any power-driven machinery; The operation of motor vehicles or service as helpers on such vehicles; Outside windows washing that involves working from window sills; All work requiring the use of ladders, scaffolds or their substitutes; Baking and most cooking activities; Work in freezers and meat coolers and all work in the processing of meat for sale; Loading or unloading of goods or property onto or from motor vehicles, railroad cars and conveyors; Catching and cooping of oultry in preparation for transport or for market; Public messinger service; 18 Minimum age to work (in/as): Manufacturing and storing of explosives; Motor-vehicle driving and outside helper on a motor vehicle; Coal mining; Occupations in forest fire fighting, forest fire prevention, timber tract operations, forestry service, logging, and sawmilling; Using Power-driven woodworking machines; Exposure to radioactive substances; Power-driven hoisting apparatus, including forklifts; Power-driven metal-forming, punching, and shearing machines; Mining, other than coal mining; Operating power-driven meat processing equipment, including meat slicers and other food slicers, in retail establishments (such as grocery stores, restaurants kitchens and delis) and wholesale establishments, and most occupations in meat and poultry slaughtering, packing, processing, orrendering; Power-driven bakery machines including vertical dough or batter mixers; Power-driven balers, compactors, and paper pro cessing machines; Manufacturing bricks, tile, and kindred products; Power-driven circular saws, bandsaws, chain saws, guillotine shears, wood chippers, and abrasive cutting discs; Wrecking, demolition, and shipbreaking operations; Roofing operations and all work on or about a roof; Excavation operations; Hours-Time Standards: 14: Fourteen- and 15-Year-Olds may not be employed before 7 a.m. or after 7 p.m. except from June 1 through Labor Day when the evening hour is extended to 9 p.m. (time is based on local standards; i.e., whether the locality has adopted daylight saving time); More than 3 hours a day on a school day, including Fridays; More than 8 hours a day on a nonschool day; More than 18 hours a week during a school weeks; More than 40 hours a week during nonschool weeks.; 16: Unrestricted (State-law may extend restrictions for 16 and 17 year old) State laws: Alabama–Hawaii: Federal state / Permission needed / Legal Working Age / Legislation; Alabama / Audited article of limited subject matter / Additional working restrictions: None: (21 years of age to serve alcoholic beverages for the consumption on premises (19 if licensee is RVP certified); 18 years of age to work in that part of an establishment where alcoholic beverages are sold or served for consumption on premises; 14/15 year olds may not work in an establishment where alcoholic beverages are sold, served, or dispensed for consumption on premises.) Working hours: 14: During the Months when Public Schools are in Session: No more than 3 hours after school; No more than 8 hours on a non-school day; No more than 6 days per week; No more than 18 hours per week; Not before 7 am or after 7 pm each day; Not during school hours. During the Summer Months: No more than 8 hours a day; No more than 6 days per week; No more than 40 hours per week; Not before 7 am or after 9 pm each day.; 16: During the Months when Public Schools are in Session: Minors 16-17-18 years old, who are enrolled in public or private school, may not work after 10 pm or before 5 am on any night preceding a school day. During the Summer Months: No hour restrictions during summer break. / ALABAMA CHILD LABOR LAWS; AL 25-8-32; AL 25-8-63; Alaska / Audited article of limited subject matter / Additional working restrictions: None: For: Newspaper sales and delivery. Babysitting, handiwork and domestic employment in or about private homes. Occupations in the entertainment industry, with an approved work permit from the Alaska Wage and Hour Administration.; 14: No dangerous or hard work; Maximum 9 hours per day (school + working); Working is prohibited from 5:00 a.m. to 9:00 p.m.; Maximum 23 working hours per week; During school vacations, work hours will be limited to 40 hours per week between the hours of 5:00 a.m. and 9:00 p.m.; 16: All minors 16 and under must have a work permit on file with the department. If the employer has a restaurant designation and is licensed to sell alcohol, then all minors 17 years of age must also have an approved work permit; 18: Unrestricted; 19: Selling tobacco or tobacco products; 21: Selling, stocking or serving alcoholic beverages.; Working hours: See federal law / Alaska Child Labor Law; Arizona / Unknown-Class article / Additional working restrictions: See federal law (some additional restrictions by state law) Working hours: 14: Maximum of 8 hours per day and 40 hours per week during the non-school day period; During the school day can only work 3 hours per day and 18 hours per school week; Arizona law further limits employment of children under the age of 16 making it unlawful for a child under the age of 16 to work between the hours of 9:30 p.m. and 6 a.m. If the child is working in door-to-door sales or deliveries, they may not work between the hours of 7 p.m. and 6 a.m.; 16: Unrestricted / A.R.S. 23–230; Arkansas / Audited article of limited subject matter / The following working restrictions do not apply for minors age 16 and 17 under following provisions: 1. He/she has graduate of any high school, vocational school, or technical school 2. He/she is married or is a parent.; Additional Working Restrictions: Under 14 No child under the age of fourteen years shall be employed or permitted to work in any remunerative occupation in this state, except that during school vacation, children under fourteen years may be employed by their parents or guardians in occupations owned or controlled by them.; 16 No child under sixteen years shall be employed or permitted to work in any occupation dangerous to the life and limb, or injurious to the health and morals of the child, or in any saloon, resort, or bar where intoxicating liquors of any kind are sold or dispensed.; No child under the age of sixteen years shall be employed, permitted, or suffered to work in any capacity: In, about, or in connection with any processes in which dangerous or poisonous acids or gases or other chemicals are used; In soldering; In occupations causing dust in injurious quantities; In scaffolding; In heavy work in the building trades; In any tunnel or excavation; In any mine, coal breaker, coke oven, or quarry; or; In any pool or billiard room.; 18 Unrestricted.; Working hours: 14: may not work: more than six days in any week; more than forty-eight hours in any week; more than eight hours in any day; before 6:00 a.m. or after 7:00 p.m., except that on nights preceding nonschool days, they may work until 9:00 p.m.; 16: May not work: more than six (6) days in any week; more than fifty-four (54) hours in any week; more than ten (10) consecutive hours in any day; more than ten (10) hours in a twenty-four-hour period; or before 6:00 a.m. or after 11:00 p.m., except that children ages sixteen (16) and seventeen (17) years may be employed until 12:00 midnight on nights preceding nonschool days.; 18: Unrestricted / Arkansas's child labor law: 11-6-101; 11-6-102; 11-6-103; 11-6-104; 11-6-105; 11-6-106; 11-6-107; 11-6-108; 11-6-109; 11-6-110; 11-6-111; 11-6-112; 11-6-113; 11-6-114; 11-6-115; 11-6-116; California / Audited article of limited subject matter / Additional working restrictions: 12 Minimum age to work: in connection with the occupation of selling or distributing newspapers, magazines, periodicals or circulars.; 16 Minimum age to work: in any type of mechanical work or any work in a gasoline service establishment; with Dispensing gas or oil, as Courtesy service and for Car cleaning, washing, and polishing; In an establishment that sells alcoholic beverages for consumption off the premises if supervised by someone over the age of 21.; 18 Minimum age to: perform an act in a premises where alcohol is served; serve alcohol in a bona fide public eating establishment if the person is no employed as a bartender and the service is in that part of the establishment used for the sale and service of food; To sell lottery tickets if supervised by someone over the age of 21.; 21 Minimum age to: sell or serve alcoholic beverages unrestricted; sell lottery tickets unrestricted.; Working hours: 12: School in session: May be employed only during school holidays and vacations (usually construed to include weekends). May never be employed on any schoolday, either before or after school. School not in session: 8 hours per day; 40 hours per week Spread of hours: 7 a.m. – 7 p.m., except that from June 1 through Labor Day, until 9 p.m.; 14: (Must have completed 7th grade to work while school in session) School in session: 3 hours per schoolday outside of school hours; 18 hours per week School not in session: 8 hours per day; 40 hours per week Spread of hours: 7 a.m. – 7 p.m., except that from June 1 through Labor Day, until 9 p.m; 16: (Must have completed 7th grade to work while school in session) School in session: 4 hours per day on any schoolday; 48 hours per week School not in session: 8 hours per day; 48 hours per week Spread of hours: 5 a.m. – 10 p.m. However, until 12:30 a.m. on any evening preceding a nonschoolday.; 18: Unrestricted / CALIFORNIA CHILD LABOR LAWS; Colorado / Unknown-Class article / Additional working restrictions: 9: Minimum age to: Delivery of handbills and advertising; Shoe shining; Gardening and care of lawns involving no power-driven lawn equipment; Cleaning of walks involving no power-driven snow-removal equipment; Casual work usual to the home of the employer and not specifically prohibited; Caddying on golf courses; Occupations similar to the above.; 12: Minimum age to: Sale and delivery of periodicals; Door-to-door selling and delivery of merchandise; Baby-sitting; Gardening and care of lawns, and cleaningof walks; contact the Division regarding use of power-driven equipment; Non-hazardous agricultural work; Occupations similar to the above.; 14: Minimum age to: on-hazardous occupations in manufacturing; Public messenger service and errands by foot, bicycle and public transportation; Operation of automatic enclosed freight and passenger elevators.; Janitorial and custodial service; Office work and clerical work; Warehousing and storage, including unloading and loading of vehicles; Non-hazardous construction and non-hazardous repair work; Occupations in retail food service; Certain gasoline service occupations; Occupations in retail stores; Occupations in restaurants, hotels, motels, or other public accommodations; Occupations related to parks or recreation; Occupations similar to the above.; 16: Minimum age to: The occupations listed above and the operation of a motor vehicle if the minor is licensed to operate the motor vehicle for such use pursuant.; 18: Minimum age to: Sell, or serve alcoholic beverages if supervised by someone 21 years of age or older.; 21: Minimum age to: Sell, or server alcoholic beverages (unrestricted).; Work hour restriction: General Restriction: No employer shall be permitted to work a minor more than forty hours in a week or more than eight hours in any twenty-four-hour period.; Schoolday Restriction: On school days, during school hours, no minor under the age of sixteen shall be permitted employment except as provided by a school release permit. After school hours no minor under the age of sixteen shall be permitted to work in excess of six hours unless the next day is not a school day.; Nighttime Restriction: Except for babysitters, no minor under the age of sixteen shall be permitted to work between the hours of nine-thirty p.m. and five a.m., unless the next day is not a school day. An exception to this rule is a minor employed as an actor, model, or performer. / Colorado Youth Employment Opportunity Act (C.R.S. 8–12-101 et seq.); Connecticut / Unknown-Class article / Additional working restrictions: 14: Minimum age to work (in/as): Agriculture; Street trades (newspaper delivery, shoe shining, baby-sitting, etc.); Hospitals (no food service or laundry); Convalescent homes (no food service or laundry); Hotels and motels (no food service or laundry); Banks; Insurance companies; Professional offices (lawyers, CPAs, etc.); Municipalities (library attendants, recreation departments, etc.); Golf caddies; Acting; Household chores for private homeowners (yard work, etc.); Licensed summer camps; Mercantile/solicitation; 15: Minimum age to work (in/as): Mercantile establishment as a bagger, cashier, or stock clerk (this also includes the sale of alcohol in grocery stores); 16: Unrestricted; 18: Minimum age to: Sell, or serve alcoholic beverages. Sell tobacco products.; Work hour restriction: 14: May not be employed: During school hours; Before 7 a.m. or after 7 p.m., except from July 1 to Labor Day, when evening hours are extended to 9 p.m.; More than 3 hours per day on school days or 8 hours on non-school days; More than 18 hours a week in school weeks or 40 hours in non-school weeks.; 16: Depending on industry.; 18: Unrestricted / Employment of Minors Act; Delaware / Audited article of limited subject matter / Additional working restrictions: 18: Selling tobacco products.; 19: Serving alcoholic beverages in restaurants.; 21: Sell alcoholic beverages and to work as a barkeeper.; Work hour restriction: 14: Before 7:00 a.m. or after 7:00 p.m.- except from June 1 through Labor Day when the evening hour shall be extended to 9:00 p.m.; More than four hours per day on school days; More than eight hours per day on non-school days; More than eighteen (18) hours in any week when school is in session for 5 days; More than six (6) days in any week; More than forty (40) hours per week when school is not in session.; 16: May not work more than twelve hours in a combination of school and work hours per day. Must have at least eight consecutive hours of non-work, non-school time in each 24-hour period. May not work more than five hours continuously without a non-work period of at least 30 consecutive minutes.; 18: Unrestricted / Delaware Child Labor Law; Florida / Unknown-Class article / Additional working restrictions: None: Minors who work for their parents in occupations not declared hazardous in the Florida legislature; Newspaper delivery (10 years old); Minors in the entertainment industry registered with Child Labor; Compliance; 14: Minimum working age; 16: For the handling certain dangerous animals; Conducting door-to-door sales of products as employment (some exceptions); Spray painting; 18: Unrestricted. Sell alcoholic beverages (as such as beer, and wine) and to work as a barkeeper. Sell tobacco products.; 21: Sell alcoholic beverages (Spirits).; Work hour restriction: 14: May work up to 15 hours per week. Not before 7 a.m. or after 7 p.m. and for no more than 3 hours a day on school days, when a school day follows. May work up to 8 hours on Friday, Saturday, Sunday, and on nonschool days, when school days do not follow, until 9 p.m.; 16: May work up to 30 hours per week. Not before 6:30 a.m. or later than 11 p.m. and for no more than 8 hours a day when school is scheduled the following day. On days when school does not follow, there are no hour restrictions.; 18: Unrestricted / The State of Florida and the Federal Fair Labor Standards Act (FLSA); Georgia (U.S. state) / Under 16: Over 16: / Additional working restrictions: Under 12: No minor under 12 years of age shall be employed or permitted to work in any gainful occupation at any time, provided that this Code section shall not be construed to apply to employment of a minor in agriculture, domestic service in private homes, or any specific employment permitted by this chapter or to employment by a parent or a person standing in the place of a parent.; Other restrictions are similar to the federal laws. Work hour restriction: 14: 4 hours on a school day; 8 hours on a nonschool day; 40 hours during a nonschool week; Not work before 6 a.m.; Not work after 9 p.m.; 16: Unrestricted / GDOL Child Labor Act; Hawaii / Audited article of limited subject matter / Additional working restrictions: None (18 years of age to sell alcoholic beverages and to work as a barkeeper) Work hour restrictions: 14: Not more than 3 hours per day on a school day, and 8 hours per day on a non-school day. During a school week, not more than 18 hours per week. During a non-school week, not more than 40 hours per week. On school days and the day before a school day: Between 7:00 a.m. and 7:00 p.m. On non-school days and the day before a non-school day: Between 6:00 a.m. and 9:00 p.m. Not more than 6 consecutive days, and 5 consecutive hours without at least a 30-minute rest or meal period.; 16: Unrestricted; Work hour restrictions: 14 Not more than 3 hours per day on a school day, and 8 hours per day on a non-school day. During a school week, not more than 18 hours per week. During a non-school week, not more than 40 hours per week. On school days and the day before a school day: Between 7:00 a.m. and 7:00 p.m. On non-school days and the day before a non-school day: Between 6:00 a.m. and 9:00 p.m. Not more than 6 consecutive days, and 5 consecutive hours without at least a 30-minute rest or meal period.; 16 Unrestricted / Hawaii Child Labor Law; State laws: Idaho–Massachusetts: Federal state / Permission needed / Legal Working Age / Legislation; Idaho / Unknown-Class article / Additional working restrictions: None (19 years of age to handle sales of alcohol or to serve it in a restaurants) Work hour restrictions: 14: No person under the age of sixteen years shall be employed or suffered or permitted to work at any gainful occupation more than fifty-four hours in any one week, nor more than nine hours in any one day; nor before the hour of six o'clock in the morning nor after the hour of nine o'clock in the evening.; 16: Unrestricted / Idaho Statutes 44-1301, 44-1302, 44-1303 and 44-1304; Indiana / Audited article of limited subject matter / Additional working restrictions: None (18 years of age to sell tobacco products; 19 years of age can "ring-up" the sale of alcoholic beverages in the course of their employment at a drug or grocery store if there is at least one other employee on the licensed premise who is twenty-one years of age or older) Work hour restrictions: 14: Restricted to: 3 hours per school day; 8 hours per non-school day; 18 hours per school week; 40 hours per non-school week; No work before 7:00 a.m. or after 7:00 p.m. (except 9:00 p.m. June 1 through Labor Day); 16: Restricted to: 8 hours per school day; 9 hours per day not followed by a school day; 30 hours per week; 40 hours per school week; 48 hours per non-school week; No more than 6 working days per week; No work before 6:00 a.m.; Work until 10:00 p.m. on nights followed by a school day; Work until 12:00 a.m. on nights not followed by a school day.; 17: 16's Restrictions apply but working: Until 10:00 p.m. on nights followed by a school day; Until 11:30 p.m. on nights followed by a school day; Until 1:00 a.m. on nights followed by a school day, but not on consecutive nights and not more than two school nights per week is permitted.; 18: Unrestricted / Indiana Child Labor Law; 905 IAC 1-15.3-1; IC 7.1-5-7-13; IC 35-46-1-11.7; Iowa / Under 16: 16 and over: / Additional working restrictions: None (16 years of age to sell liquor, wine, or beer in original unopened containers for off-premises consumption (grocery stores, convenience stores, liquor stores, etc.); 18 years of age to sell and dispense liquor, wine, or beer for on-premises consumption (restaurants, bars, clubs, etc.); 21 years of age to deliver liquor, wine, or beer in original unopened containers to a home or other designated location for personal use (licensees and permittees authorized to sell liquor, wine, or beer for off-premises consumption)) Work hour restrictions: 14: Permitted: outside school hours, between 7 a.m. and 7 p.m., from the day after Labor Day (in September) through May 31, and no more than four hours per day, Monday through Friday, or eight hours per day on Saturdays, Sundays and holidays. No more than a total of 28 hours per week is allowed. From June 1 through Labor Day, a minor may work up to eight hours per day between 7 a.m. and 9 p.m., but not more than 40 hours per week.; 16: Unrestricted / Iowa Code sections §123.46A, §123.47, §123.49(2)(f); 185-4.25 Iowa Administrative Code; Iowa Child Labor Law; Kansas / Under 16: 16 and over: / Additional working restrictions: None (18 years of age to work as a server in a restaurant serving alcohol, and to sell 3.2 ABV beer; 21 years of age Unrestricted) Work hour restrictions: None (see federal law) / Fair Labor Standards Act; Kentucky / Unknown-Class article / Additional working restrictions: Minors under the age of 18 are prohibited from working in/as: Occupations in or about Plants or Establishments Manufacturing or Storing Explosives or Articles Containing Explosive Components; Motor-vehicle Driver and outside helper on a motor vehicle; Coal Mine Occupations; Logging or Sawmill Operations; Operation of Power-Driven Woodworking machines; Exposure to Radioactive Substances; Power-driven hoisting apparatus, including forklifts; Operation of Power-Driven Metal Forming, punching, and shearing machines; Mining, other than coal mining; Operation of Power-driven bakery machines including vertical dough or batter mixers; Manufacturing bricks, tile, and kindred products; Wrecking, demolition, and shipbreaking operations; Roofing operations and all work on or about a roof; In, about or in connection with any establishment where alcoholic liquors are distilled, rectified, compounded, brewed, manufactured, bottled, sold for consumption or dispensed unless permitted by the rules and regulations of the Alcoholic Beverage Control Board (except they may be employed in places where the sale of alcoholic beverages by the package is merely incidental to the main business actually conducted); Pool or Billiard Room. Work hour restrictions: 14: May not work (more than): before 7:00 a.m. and after 7:00 p.m. (9:00 p.m. June 1 through Labor Day); 3 Hours per day on a school day; 8 Hours per day on a nonschool day; 18 Hours per week (if school is in session) and 8 Hours per day 40 Hours per Week (if school is not in session); 16: May not work (more than): before 6:00 a.m. and after 10:30 p.m. preceding aschool day/1:00 a.m. preceding a nonschool day;6 Hours per day on a school day; 8 Hours per day on a nonschool day; 30 Hours per week (if school is in session); No restrictions if school is not in session.; 18: Unrestricted / KRS 339.230; 803 KAR 1:100; KRS 339.210; Louisiana / Audited article of limited subject matter / Additional working restrictions: None (18 years of age to work as a server in a restaurant that sells alcohol or as a bartender. Age is not a factor in working for any business for which selling alcohol is not their primary purpose as long as that business holds an off-premises license, meaning alcohol cannot be consumed on the property.) Work hour restrictions: 12: Permitted if: The minor's parent or legal guardian is an owner or partner in the business in which the minor is to be employed. The minor works only under the direct supervision of the parent or legal guardian who owns or is a part ner in the business. All of the protections afforded to minors fourteen and fifteen years of age shall be afforded to minors twelve and thirteen years of age.; 14: Minors age 14 to 15 may be employed only after school hours and during nonschool days, but only under highly regulated circumstances. Prohibitions: more than six hours in any day; more than 24 hours in any week; between the hours of 11 p.m. and 6 a.m.; Restrictions for commercial motion picture, film or video productions, or modeling: Prohibited: before 7 a.m. for studio production, 6 a.m. for location productions; for minors under six years of age, after 7 p.m. for minors six years of age to 15 years of age, 8 p.m. on any day prior to a day during which school is in session or 10 p.m. on any day prior to a day during which school is not in session, as defined by the local superintendent for the school district in which the minor resides; Minors under six years of age shall not work more than six hours per day; minors six years of age to 15 years of age shall not work more than eight hours per day; Minors shall receive a 12-hour rest break at the end of each work day, before the commencement of the next day of work; Minors shall not be employed more than six consecutive days in any one week, nor more than 36 hours per week for minors under six years of age, nor more than 48 hours per week for minors six years of age to 15 years of age; 16: Minors age 16 may not work between the hours of 11:00 p.m. and 5:00 a.m. on any day before a day school is in session.; 17: Minors age 17 may not work between the hours of midnight and 5:00 a.m. on any day before a day when school is in session. These restrictions do not apply to minors who have graduated from high school. / La. R.S. 23:151 et seq.and La. Admin. Code tit. 40, sec. VII. 103-303; Maine / Under 16: 16 and over: / Additional working restrictions: None (17 years of age to work as a server in a restaurant that serves alcohol or as a bartender and handle, transport, and sell beer, wine, and spirits. The presence of a supervisor over the age of 21 is required) Work hour restrictions: 14: No more than 6 days in a row; Cannot work before 7:00 a.m.; Not after 7:00 p.m. during school year; Cannot work after 9:00 p.m. during summer vacation.; When School is not in Session: No more than 8 hours in any one day (weekend, holiday, vacation or workshop); Not more than 40 hours in a week (school must be out entire week).; When School is in Session: No more than 3 hours on a school day, including Friday; Not more than 18 hours in a week that school is in session one or more days; 16: No more than 6 days in a row; Cannot work before 7:00 a.m. on a school day; Cannot work before 5:00 a.m. on a non-school day; Cannot work after 10:15 p.m. the night before a school day; Can work up to midnight when there is no school the next day.; When School is not in Session: No more than 10 hours in any one day (weekend, holiday, vacation, or workshop); No more than 50 hours in a week.; When School is in Session: No more than 6 hours on a school day; No more than 10 hours on any holiday, vacation, or workshop day; On last day of school week may work up to 8 hours; No more than 24 hours in a week except may work 50 hours any week that approved school calendar is less than 3 days or during the first and last week of school calendar.; 18: Unrestricted / Maine Law Governing the Employment of Minors; Maryland / Audited article of limited subject matter / Additional working restrictions: None (18 years of age to work as a server in a restaurant that sells alcohol and to sell wine and beer in retail stores) Work hour restrictions: 14: Not before 7:00 a.m. or after 8:00 p.m.; Minors may work until 9:00 p.m. from Memorial Day to Labor Day.; When School is not in Session: Not more than 8 hours a day; work more than 40 hours in any week.; When School is in Session: Not more than 4 hours a day; work more than 23 hours in any week.; 16: May spend no more than 12 hours in a combination of school hours and work hours each day; Must be allowed at least 8 consecutive hours of non-work, non-school time in each 24 hour period.; 18: Unrestricted / Labor and Employment Article, Title 3, Subtitle 2, Annotated Code of Maryland; Massachusetts / Audited article of limited subject matter / Additional working restrictions: None: Children may work at any age on a farm owned or operated by their parents.; 9: Children as young as 9 may deliver newspapers with a special badge and written consent of a parent or guardian.; 10: Minors age 10 and 11 may engage in limited seasonal work with special permission from the federal Secretary of Labor.; 12: Minors 12 or older may sell certain articles for sale in public places, although selling door-to-door is prohibited until the age of 16. Minors age 12 and 13 may work on farms with their parents or at other farms if they have the written consent of their parents.; 16: Unrestricted (see federal law); 18: To work as a bartender or in a restaurant serving alcohol, and may handle, transport, and sell beer, wine, and spirits in a retail store.; Work hour restrictions: 14: 14-15-year-old minors may not be employed: During school hours EXCEPT as provided in approved work experience and career exploration programs; Between 7:00 p.m. and 7:00 a.m. EXCEPT from July 1 through Labor Day, when they may work until 9:00 p.m; More than 3 hours per day during school weeks, not more than 8 hours per day during weeks when school is not in session; More than 18 hours per school week EXCEPT in approved work experience and career exploration programs, in which case, they may work 23 hours; More than 40 hours per week when school is not in session; More than 6 days per week.; 16: 16-17-year-old minors may not be employed: Between 10:00 p.m. and 6:00 a.m. with exceptions: When an establishment stops serving customers at 10:00 p.m., the minor may work until 10:15 p.m.; On nights not preceding a regularly scheduled school day they may work until 11:30 p.m.; In restaurants and race tracks, they may work until 12:00 a.m. on nights not preceding a regularly scheduled school day.; More than 9 hours per day; More than 48 hours in a week; or; More than 6 days per week.; 18: Unrestricted / M.G.L. c. 149, § 104.; State laws: Michigan–New Mexico: Federal state / Permission needed / Legal Working Age / Legislation; Michigan / Audited article of limited subject matter / Additional working restrictions: Minors may not work: Contact with hazardous substances, chemicals, explosives, or radioactive substances.; Driving and working as an outside helper (pizza delivery etc.); Jobs in the logging and sawmill industry.; Jobs using woodworking machinery.; Brazing, welding, soldering or heat treating for those less than 16 years of age.; Work on construction sites, excavation sites, bridges, streets or highways.; Slaughtering, butchering, cutting meat or using meat slicers, cleavers or boning knives.; Occupations involving power driven equipment, tools, saws or machinery (bakery machines, paper product machines, and metal-forming, punching and shearing machines).; (A licensee shall not allow any person who is less than 18 years of age to sell or serve alcoholic liquor.) Special requirements: 11: 11-year-olds and those older may work as golf caddies, athletic event referees and bridge caddies, under specific conditions.; 13: 13-year-olds and those older may work as corn detasselers and at trap shooting events.; Work hour restrictions: A minor may not work more than six days per week.; Minors are limited to working no more than 10 hours in a day, with a weekly average of 8 hours per day.; Combined hours of school and work cannot exceed 48 hours in a work week.; Special hours apply to workers in agricultural processing. An information sheet is available from the Wage & Hour Division.; 14: 14- and 15-year-olds may not work: After 9:00 p.m. or before 7:00 a.m. 14- and 15-year-olds may not work during school hours.; 16: 16- and 17-year-olds may not work: Before 6:00 a.m. or after 10:30 p.m., Sunday through Thursday.; Before 6:00 a.m. or after 11:30 p.m. Fridays and Saturdays, during school vacation periods, and during periods when a minor is not regularly enrolled in school.; Approval may be granted for 16- and 17-year-olds to work beyond the starting and ending times specified in the Youth Employment Standards Act. Approvals may be obtained from the Wage & Hour Division / YOUTH EMPLOYMENT STANDARDS ACT (Michigan) - Act 90 of 1978; MCL 436.1707 (6) of the Liquor Control Code states; Minnesota / Unknown-Class article / Additional working restrictions: Minors are prohibited from working in the following capacities: Serving liquor.; Working with hazardous materials such as explosives.; Operating power-driven machinery, including motor vehicles.; On or about construction sites.; Work hour restrictions: 14: Minors under 16 may not work: Before 7 a.m. or after 9 p.m. with the exception of a newspaper carrier.; For more than 40 hours a week or more than eight hours per 24-hour period, except in agricultural operations.; During school hours on school days without an employment certificate issued by the appropriate school officials.; 16: Minors over 16 but under 18 may not work: Later than 11 p.m. on evenings before school days or before 5 a.m. on school days. With written permission from a parent or guardian, these hours may be expanded to 11:30 p.m. and 4:30 a.m / Minnesota Rules 5200.0910 and 5200.0920; Minnesota Child Labor Standards Act; Mississippi / Unknown-Class article / Additional working restrictions: Minors under the age of 17 are not permitted to operate vehicles used for transportation purposes.; (18: To serve alcoholic beverages in Restaurants; 21: To work as a bartender or to handle alcohol in a liquor store.) Work hour restrictions: 14: Only between the hours of 6 a.m. and 7 p.m.; 16: Prohibited from working more than 8 hours in a day and 44 hours in a week.; Marriage: Child labor laws in the State of Mississippi do not apply to minor workers who are married before they reach the age of 18. / Fair Labor Standards Act; Title 67 Chapter 1 - Local Option Alcoholic Beverage Control; Missouri / Under 16 during the regular school term: 16 and over: / Additional working restrictions: Minors under 16 may not work in/as: Any power driven machinery, except lawn and garden machinery used in domestic service at or around a private residence, provided that, there shall be an agreement between an occupant of the private residence and the child, and by no other person, firm or corporation, other than a parent, legal custodian or guardian of the child, for the performance of such work.; The oiling, cleaning, maintenance, or washing of machinery.; Any ladders, scaffolding, or their substitute.; Any mine or quarry except in offices or at other nonhazardous employment.; Stone cutting or polishing except those found in jewelry type business.; Any plant manufacturing, processing, storing, or transporting Type A and B explosives, ammunition, or like materials, or in an establishment in which sales of Type A and B explosive materials make up fifty percent or more of gross sales.; The operation of any motor vehicle.; Any blast furnace, rolling mill, foundry, forging shop, or in any establishment where heating of metals is carried on or where cold rolling, stamping, shearing, punching, of metal stock is carried on.; Saw mills, cooperage stock mills, or where woodworking machinery is used.; The operation of freight elevators, hoisting machines or cranes, or on or about any manlifts.; Occupations involving exposure to ionizing or nonionizing radiation or any radioactive substance.; Any occupation involving exposure to any toxic or hazardous chemicals.; Any capacity in or about a motel, resort, hotel, where sleeping accommodations are furnished except in offices or locations physically separated from the sleeping accommodations.; Any place or establishment in which intoxicating alcoholic liquors or beverages are manufactured, bottled, stored, or sold for consumption on or off the premises, except in establishments where at least fifty percent of the gross sales consist of goods, merchandise, or commodities other than alcoholic beverages.; No child under sixteen years of age shall be employed or permitted to work in any street occupation connected with peddling, begging, door-to-door selling or any activity pursued on or about any public street or public place. This prohibition does not apply to any public school or church or charitable fund-raising activity, or distribution of literature relating to a registered political candidate.; Any other occupation or place of employment dangerous to the life, limb, health, or morals of children under the age of sixteen.; Work hour restrictions: A child shall not be employed, permitted or suffered to work at any gainful employment for more than three hours per day in any school day, more than eight hours in any nonschool day, more than six days or forty hours in any week. Normal work hours shall not begin before seven o'clock in the morning nor extend to after 9:00 p.m., except as provided in subsection 2 of this section. The provisions of this subsection may be waived by the director, in full or in part, depending upon the nature of the employment. Such waiver shall be provided in writing to the employer by the director.; On all evenings from Labor Day to June first, a child shall not be employed, permitted or suffered to work at any gainful employment after 7:00 p.m. nor after 9:00 p.m. from June first to Labor Day; except that a child who has passed his or her fourteenth birthday but is under sixteen years of age may be employed at a regional fair from June first to Labor Day, if such child does not work after 10:30 p.m., is supervised by an adult, parental consent is given and the provisions of this subsection are complied with. The regional fair exception shall not apply to those entities covered by the Fair Labor Standards Act. The provisions of this subsection do not apply to children who have been permanently excused from school pursuant to the provisions of chapter 167. The provisions of this subsection may be waived by the director, in full or in part, depending upon the nature of the employment. Such waiver shall be provided in writing to the employer by the director. / RSMo 1939 § 9622, A.L. 1957 p. 525 § 6, A.L. 1989 H.B. 461, A.L. 1997 S.B. 220; L. 1989 H.B. 461, A.L. 2002 S.B. 923, et al.; RSMo 1939 § 9621, A.L. 1957 p. 525 § 5, A.L. 1971 S.B. 171, A.L. 1995 H.B. 300 & 95 merged with H.B. 414, A.L. 1998 H.B. 1748, A.L. 1999 S.B. 234, A.L. 2002 S.B. 923, et al.; Montana / Unknown-Class article / Additional working restrictions: None (18 years of age to work as a server in a restaurant that sells alcohol and to sell alcohol in retail stores) Work hour restrictions: 14: May not work during school hours, except as provided for in Work Experience and Career Exploration Programs approved by the department or the office of public instruction.; Working is permitted from 7 a.m. to 7 p.m., except that the minor may be employed until 9 p.m. during the periods outside the school year (June 1 through Labor Day, depending on local standards).; Maximum 3 hours on a school day.; Maximum 18 hours in a school week.; Maximum 8 hours on a non-school day.; Maximum 40 hours in a non-school week.; 16: Unrestricted / Child Labor Standards Act TITLE 41. MINORS - CHAPTER 2. CHILD LABOR; Montana Code Annotated, TITLE 16: ALCOHOL AND TOBACCO; Nebraska / Under 16 during the regular school term: 16 and over: / Additional working restrictions: None (19 years of age to work as a server in a restaurant that sells alcohol and to sell alcohol in retail stores) Work hour restrictions: None (See federal law) / Neb. Rev. Stat. §§48-301 to 48-313; Nebraska Liquor Control Commission; Nevada / Unknown-Class article / Additional working restrictions: Minors under 16 may not work: The preparation of any composition in which dangerous or poisonous acids are used.; The manufacture of paints, colors or white lead.; Dipping, drying or packing matches.; The manufacture of goods for immoral purposes.; Any mine, coal breaker, quarry, smelter, ore reduction works, laundry, tobacco warehouse, cigar factory or other factory where tobacco is manufactured or prepared.; Any distillery, brewery or any other establishment where malt or alcoholic liquors are manufactured, packed, wrapped or bottled.; Any glass furnace, smelter, the outside erection and repair of electric wires, the running or management of elevators, lifts or hoisting machines, or oiling hazardous or dangerous machinery in motion.; Switch tending, gate tending, or track repairing.; No child under the age of 16 years shall be employed or permitted or suffered to work as a brakeman, fireman, engineer, motorman or conductor upon any railroad in or about establishments where nitroglycerin, dynamite, dualin, guncotton, gunpowder or other high or dangerous explosives are manufactured, compounded or stored.; No child under the age of 16 years shall be employed or permitted or suffered to work in any other employment declared by the Labor Commissioner to be dangerous to the lives or limbs, or injurious to the health or morals, of children under the age of 16 years.; Minors under 18 may not work: In begging, receiving alms, or in any mendicant occupation.; In any indecent or immoral exhibition or practice.; In any practice or exhibition dangerous or injurious to life, limb, health or morals.; As a messenger for delivering letters, telegrams, packages or bundles to any house of prostitution or assignation.; In any public dance hall within this State where alcoholic beverages are dispensed.; In any area of a casino where there is gaming or where the sale of alcoholic beverages is the primary commercial activity unless the minor is in the casino area to provide entertainment pursuant to an employment contract.; (The minimum age to serve or sell alcohol in a grocery store or convenience mart is 16 as long as the minor is supervised by someone over the age of 21; The minimum age to work as a bartender or in a restaurant that sells alcohol is 21.) Work hour restrictions: 14: Maximum 48 hours in 1 week, and 8 hours in 1 day.; 16: Unrestricted / CHAPTER 609 - EMPLOYMENT OF MINORS: NRS 609.190 Employing or permitting child under 16 years of age to work in certain occupations prohibited.; NRS 609.210 Employing or exhibiting minor in certain injurious, immoral or dangerous activities: Criminal penalty.; NRS 609.240 Maximum hours of employment of child under 16 years of age.; CHAPTER 202 - CRIMES AGAINST PUBLIC HEALTH AND SAFETY; NRS 202.020 Purchase, consumption or possession of alcoholic beverage by minor.; NRS 202.057 Using person who is less than 18 years of age to distribute material that includes offer for alcoholic beverages.; New Hampshire / Under 16 16 and over: (But written permission of parents is needed) / Additional working restrictions: None (17 years of age to work as a server in a restaurant that sells alcohol and to sell alcohol in retail stores) Work hour restrictions: 12: Minors aged 12–15 years may not work: (additionally to the federal legal working age legislations); During school-hours.; Before 7 a.m. or after 9 p.m.; More than 3 hours per day, and maximum 23 hours per school week.; More than 8 hours per day, and maximum 48 hours per school week.; 16: Minors aged 16 and 17 years may not work: (Enrolled in school); More than 6 consecutive days, nor more than 30 hours peer week during the school calendar week.; More than 6 consecutive days, nor more than 48 hours peer week during the school vacation weeks or summer vacation.; More than 10 hours per day in manufactoring, nor more than 10-1/4 hours per day in manual or mechanical labor, nor more than 8 hours per night, if working at night.; 16: Minors aged 16 and 17 years may not work: (Not enrolled in school); In manufactoring more than 10 hours per day, nor more than 48 hours per week.; In manual or mechanical labor, more than 10-1/4 hours per day, nor more than 54 hours per week.; Night work is restricted to no more than 8 hours by shift and 48 hours per week. / TITLE XXIII LABOR CHAPTER 276-A YOUTH EMPLOYMENT LAW: Section 276-A:4; Section 276-A:11; Section 276-A:13; Section 276-A:5; Section 276-A:12; CHAPTER Lab 1000 YOUTH EMPLOYMENT; New Jersey; New Mexico; State laws: New York–South Dakota: Federal state / Permission needed / Legal Working Age / Legislation; New York / Under 18: Over 18: / Additional working restrictions: (18 years of age to work as a bartender, serve alcohol in a restaurant, and work in a liquor store if supervised by someone over 21.): Minors under 18 may not work: At construction work, including wrecking, demolition, roofing, or excavating operations and the painting or exterior cleaning of a building structure from an elevated surface.; Involving the operation of circular saws, band saws, and guillotine shears.; In or about a slaughtering and meat-packing establishment, or rendering plant.; Involving the operation of power-driven woodworking, metal-forming, metal-punching, metal-shearing, bakery and paper products machines.; Involving the operation of power-driven hoisting apparatus, the manufacture of brick, tile, and like products and exposure to radioactive substances or ionizing radiation, or exposure to silica or other harmful dust.; Like logging occupations and occupations in the operation of any sawmill, lath mill, shingle mill, or cooperage-stock mill.; In mining or in connection with a mine or quarry.; As a helper on a motor vehicle.; In the care or operation of a freight or passenger elevator, except that minor over 16 may operate automatic, push-button control elevators.; In manufacturing, packing, or storing of explosives, or in the use or delivery of explosives.; Operating or using any emery, tripoli, rouge, corundum, stone, silicon carbide, or any abrasive, or emery polishing or buffing wheel, where articles of the baser metals or iridium are manufactured.; Adjusting belts to machinery or cleaning, oiling, or wiping machinery; Packing paints, dry colors, or red or white leads.; Preparing any composition in which dangerous or poisonous acids are used.; Operating steam boilers subject to section 204 of the Labor Law.; In penal or correctional institutions, if the job relates to the custody or care of prisoners or inmates.; These rules do not apply to: Workers younger than 18 who are apprentices individually registered in DOL registered apprenticeship programs.; Student-learners enrolled in recognized cooperative vocational training programs.; Trainees in approved on-the-job training programs.; Workers 16 or 17 years old who have completed training as a student learner or trainee in an approved on-the-job training program.; Workers 16 or 17 years old who have completed a training program given by a public school or a non-profit institution that includes DOL approved safety instruction.; Minors under 16 may not work: Any factory work, except in delivery and clerical employment in an enclosed office of a factory or in dry cleaning stores, shoe repair shops, and similar service stores.; Operating or assisting in operating any machinery unless all moving parts other than keys, levers, or handles are so guarded as to prevent any part of the person or clothing for the operator from touching them.; Painting or exterior cleaning in connection with the maintenance of a building or structure.; Operating washing, grinding, cutting, slicing, pressing, or mixing machinery.; Work at institutions in the Department of Mental Health.; Industrial homework.; Places of entertainment as a rope or wirewalker or gymnast, unless protected by the use of safety devices or protective equipment that comply with the Federal Occupational Safety and Health Act.; Peddling; drug traffic; or any practice, exhibition, or place dangerous or injurious to life, limb, or morals.; Dangerous farm jobs.; Work hour restrictions: 14: Minors aged 14 and 15 may maximum work: When school is in Session: 3 hours on school days; 18 hours per week; 6 days per week; from: 7 am to 7 pm.; When school is not in Session: 8 hours per day; 40 hours per week; 6 days per week; from: 7 am to 9 pm.; 16: Minors aged 16 and 17 may maximum work: When school is in Session: 4 hours on days preceding school days; 28 hours per week; 6 days per week; from: 6 am to 10 pm.; When school is not in Session: 8 hours per day; 48 hours per week; 6 days per week; from: 6 am to Midnight; Farm work: Minors aged 12 or 13 may maximum work: 4 hours per day; from: 7 am to 7 pm June 21 to Labor Day/ 9 am to 4 pm Day after Labor Day to June 20; Minors aged 14 or older are unrestricted.; Newspaper carriers: Minors aged 11 to 18 may maximum work: 4 Hours on school days 5 Hours on other days; from: 5 am to 7 pm or 30 minutes prior to Sunset, whichever is later.; Street trades: Minors aged 14 to 18 may maximum work: 4 Hours on school days 5 Hours on other days; from: 6 am to 7 pm. / New York child labour law: PART 186 CHILD PERFORMERS - (Statutory authority: Labor Law §154-a); Subpart 186-3; Subpart 186-4; Subpart 186-5; Subpart 186-6; Subpart 186-7; Subpart 186-9; Subpart 186-10; NEW YORK STATE LIQUOR AUTHORITY; North Carolina / Unknown-Class article / Additional working restrictions: Under 16: No child under 16 years of age shall be employed or permitted to work in, or about, or in connection with any mill, factory, cannery, workshop, manufacturing or mercantile establishment, laundry, bakery, office, hotel, restaurant, barber shop, boot-black stand, public stable, garage, place of amusement, brick yard, lumber yard, or any messenger or delivery service.; Newspaper and magazine carrier: Newspaper and magazine carrier boys, operating on fixed routes, are not classified as being employed in street trades. Boys under 16 and over 14 may be employed as carrier boys, under regular employment certificates, between 5:00 a.m. and 8:00 p.m., but the hours of work and the hours in school shall not exceed eight hours in any one day. These hours are fixed by Sec. 5033, C. S., as amended by Ch. 125, Public Laws of 1931, which further limits the hours of work for carrier boys to four hours per day and 24 hours per week.; Neighborhood Magazine Sales: Nothing in the above rulings shall be construed to prohibit a boy under 14 years of age from selling and delivering magazines and periodicals in the vicinity of his home and under the supervision of his parents.; Street Trades: are defined as selling merchandise, such as newspapers, magazines, peanuts, etc., or working as itinerant boot-blacks, etc., on the streets. Girls under 16 years of age will not be permitted to engage in any form of street trades. Boys 12 and 13 years of age may engage in various forms of street trades during the time school.; Place of Amusement: The employment of any child under the age of 14 years in a place of amusement is illegal.; Work hour restrictions: Under 16: Minors under the age of 16 may maximum work: 8 hours per day.; 48 hours per week.; No child under 16 years of age (except newspaper carrier boys) may be employed or permitted to work before 6:00 o'clock in the morning or after 7:00 o'clock in the evening.; 16: Unrestricted / RULES AND REGULATIONS OF THE DEPARTMENT OF LABOR RELATIVE TO THE EMPLOYMENT OF CHILDREN UNDER SIXTEEN YEARS OF AGE STANDARDS OF THE DEPARTMENT OF LABOR FOR GRADING INDUSTRIAL PLANTS; North Dakota / Under 16: Over 16: / Additional working restrictions: Under 16: No child under 16 years of age shall be employed or permitted to work in, as or about, or in connection with: Employment involving the use of any power driven machinery.; Construction work other than cleaning, errandrunning, moving, stacking, loading, or unloading materials by hand.; Lumbering or logging operations and Sawmills or planing mills.; Manufacture, disposition, or use of explosives.; Operation of any steam boiler, steam machinery, or steam generating apparatus, operation or assisting in the operation of laundry machinery and operating or assisting in the operation of passenger or freight elevators; Preparing any composition in which dangerous or poisonous acids are used; Work in a mine or quarry.; Manufacture of goods for immoral purposes.; Any other employment not herein specifically enumerated that may be considered dangerous to life or limb or in which health may be injured or morals depraved.; Occupations which involve working on an elevated surface, with or without the use of safety equipment, including ladders and scaffolds in which the work is performed higher than six feet off of the ground.; Security positions or occupations that require the use of a firearm or other weapon.; Door-to-door sales of any kind.; Occupations involving the loading, handling, mixing, applying, or working around or near any fertilizers, herbicides, fungicides, pesticides, insecticides, or any other chemicals, toxins, or heavy metals.; Occupations in or in connection with medical or other dangerous wastes.; Occupations which involve the handling or storage of blood, blood products, body fluids, and body tissues.; Cooking, baking, grilling, or frying.; Warehouse or storage work.; Trucking or commercial driving.; Additionally, any employment which would compel the person to remain standing constantly is prohibited.; Over 16: Unrestricted.; (21 to work as a bartender or to sell alcohol in a liquor store; 19 to serve alcohol in a restaurant if supervised by someone 21 or older) Work hour restrictions: Under 16: Minors under the age of 16 may maximum work: 3 hours on a school day.; 18 hours in a school week.; 8 hours on a non-school day.; 40 hours in a non-school week.; Labor Days: May 31 7:00 am–7:00 pm; June 1 7:00 am–9:00 pm.; Over 16: Unrestricted. / N.D.C.C. Chapter 34-07: Child Labor 34-07-01 - 34-07-21; NORTH DAKOTA CENTURY CODE: TITLE 5 ALCOHOLIC BEVERAGES: CHAPTER 5-01; Ohio / Under 18: Over 18: / Additional working restrictions: Under 18: No child under 18 years of age shall be employed or permitted to work in, as or about, or in connection with: Occupations involving slaughtering, meat-packing, processing or rendering.; Power-driven bakery machines, paper products machines, metal forming, punching and shearing machines, woodworking machines and hoisting apparatus.; Occupations involved in the manufacture of brick, tile and kindred products.; Occupations involved in the manufacture of chemicals.; Manufacturing or storage occupations involving explosives.; Occupations involving exposure to radioactive substances and to ionizing radiations.; Occupations involved in the operation of power-driven circular saws, band saws and guillotine shears.; Coal mines.; Occupations in connection with mining, other than coal.; Logging and sawmilling.; Motor vehicle occupations.; Maritime and longshoreman occupations.; Railroads.; Excavation operations.; Roofing operations.; Wrecking, demolition, and shipbreaking.; (21 years of age to work as a bartender; 19 years of age to work as a server in a restaurant that sells alcohol; 18 is the minimum age to work in a liquor store or transport alcohol) Work hour restrictions: Under 16: No person under 16 shall be employed: During school hours except where specifically permitted.; Before 7 a.m. or after 9 p.m. from June 1 to September 1 or during any school holiday of 5 school days or more; or after 7 p.m. at any other time.; For more than 3 hours a day in any school day; For more than 18 hours in any school week.; For more than 8 hours in any day when school is not in session.; For more than 40 hours in any week that school is not in session nor during school hours, unless employment is incidental to bona fide programs of vocational cooperative training, work-study, or other work-oriented programs with the purpose of educating students, and the program meets standards established by the state board of education.; Under 18: No person 16 or 17 who is required to attend school shall be employed: Before 7 a.m. on any day that school is in session or 6 a.m. if the person was not employed after 8 p.m. the previous night.; After 11 p.m. on any night preceding a day that school is in session. / Ohio Revised Code - Title [41] XLI LABOR AND INDUSTRY Chapter 4109: EMPLOYMENT OF MINORS; Ohio Revised Code - Title [43] XLIII LIQUOR Chapter 4301: LIQUOR CONTROL LAW; Oklahoma / Under 18: Over 18: / Additional working restrictions: None (18 to work as a bartender, to transport alcohol, or to work as a server in a restaurant that sells alcohol) / Oklahoma Statute 37-537: Intoxicating Liquors; Oregon / Unknown-Class article / Additional working restrictions: Under 18: No child under 18 years of age shall be employed or permitted to work in, as or about, or in connection with: Contact with/operating power-driven food slicers, grinders and choppers (includes cleaning, even if unassembled); Motor vehicle driving, including motor vehicle outside helpers, (except under limited circumstances for minors 17 years of age); Operating, repairing and cleaning bakery machines; Lumber mill, logging and sawmilling occupations; Tasks performed in connection with active forest fires; Operating balers, metal strap banders and compactors; Operating power-driven hand drills; sanders; woodworkingmachines; Excavating and working in trenches over 4’ in depth; Roofing and related occupations; Operating power-driven hoisting apparatus and lifts; Manufacturing, storing and using explosives; Operating power-driven metal forming, punching and shearing machines; Occupations in connection with power-driven meat processing machinery; Meat and poultry slaughtering; packing, processing or rendering; Contact with circular, chain, band saws and guillotine shears; Operating commercial mixers; Using power nail/impact guns, wire stitchers and fasteners; All mining occupations; Operating power-driven paper products machines; Wrecking, demolition, and ship-breaking operations; Manufacturing brick, tile and kindred products; Messenger services between 10:00 pm and 5:00 am; Under 16: No child under 16 years of age shall be employed or permitted to work in, as or about, or in connection with: Manufacturing/processing occupations; Work in locations where power-driven machinery is used; Work in workshops or warehouses; Work in or on boats or commercial docks; Lifeguard/swim occupations except for trained/certified 15 year-olds; Work around constructions sites and equipment; Using pressure washers; Cooking with open flame grill, manual fryer, broiler, or surface or oil more than 100 degrees; Using pizza, bakery or convection ovens; Work in connection with golf carts; Using ladders, scaffolds or substitutes; Outside window cleaning above ground; Work in grain elevators; Work in gravel or sand plants or bunkers; Land clearing; Lumber loading; Washing, loading or unloading trucks (other than personal, non-powered tools/items); Contact with power mowers/cutters/blowers; Sign waving, unless in front of business; Employment in commercial laundries; Welding or soldering work; Occupations in connection with mechanical amusements; Surveying; Wood cutting/sawing; Office work only in auto wrecking yards, junk dealer, waterworks, lumbering, motor vehicle (transportation) operations; (18 to perform any work that involves selling or handling alcohol) Work hour restrictions: Under 16: Minors under the age of 16 may maximum work: 3 hours on a school day.; 18 hours in a school week.; 8 hours on a non-school day.; 40 hours in a non-school week.; Only between the hours of 7 a.m. and 7 p.m. Working is not allowed during school hours.; Over 16: Minors over the age of 16 may maximum work: 44 hours per week. / WH-218 (Rev. 12/30/13); 2013 Oregon Revised Statutes § 471.565; Pennsylvania / Under 18: Over 18: / Additional working restrictions: Prohibited Occupations for all Minors in Entertainment: Any acrobatic act that is hazardous to the minor's safety or well-being.; Use of/or exposure to dangerous weapons or pyrotechnical devises.; Activities that have a high level of inherent danger including activities involving speed, height, a high level of physical exertion and highly specialized gear or spectacular stunts.; An act that constitutes sexual abuse or sexual exploitation of minors.; Boxing, sparring or wrestling, except for a bona fide athletic or recognized amateur competition or activity or non-contact portrayal.; Assisting performers in animal act, conducting an animal into a ring or on stage, or riding an animal when the animal exceeds half the weight of the child performer.; Prohibited Occupations for all Minors: Brickmaker; Crane-, elevator operator; Electrical worker; Excavator; Explosives manufacturing; Forest firefighting, Forest service, Mill worker; Meat processing; Motion picture projectionist; Motor vehicles (Exception for occasional driving for licensed 17 year olds with state approved driver education course, if vehicle does not exceed 6,000 pounds and has restraining device, driving is during daylight, within 30 mile radius of employer, and limited to 2 trips per day away from employer location.); Paint, Acids and Poison manufacturer; Roofer; Woodworking (Using power-driven woodworking machines, including supervising/controlling operation of machines, feeding/assisting with feeding materials into machines; setting up, adjusting, repairing, oiling or cleaning power-driven woodworking machines, off-bearing from circular saws and guillotine-action veneer clippers.* Exception, 16-17 year olds may place material on moving chain/hopper for automatic feeding.); Spray coater; Welder; Wrecking and/or demolition worker; All minors are also prohibited from working: In establishments where alcoholic beverages are produced, sold or dispensed (Except in part of establishment where alcohol is not served, or hotels, clubs, or restaurants where alcohol is served and the establishment has a Sunday sales license issued by the Liquor Control Board, and minor is serving food, clearing tables and/or related duties, but minor may not serve or dispense alcohol. Performing arts students engaged in uncompensated exhibitions may perform at a licensed establishment, under proper supervision in accordance with the Liquor Code.); On boats (Pilot, fireman or engineer on any boat or vessel.); On machinery (Including repairing, cleaning or oiling machinery in motion and operating or assisting in the operation of the following: emery wheels, metal plate bending, forming, punching, hammering, bending, rolling and shearing machines, punch presses, wire-stitching, stapling machines, circular saws, band saws, guillotine shears, chain saws, reciprocating saws, wood chippers, and abrasive cutting discs.; On baking machinery (Operating, assisting, setting up, adjusting, repairing, oiling or cleaning dough/batter mixer, bread dividing, rounding or molding machine, dough brake, dough sheeter, bread slicer/wrapper machine or cake cutting band saw, and setting up/adjusting cookie or cracker machine. Except for 16 and 17 year olds setting up, adjusting, repairing, oiling and cleaning lightweight, small capacity, portable counter-top power-driven food mixers comparable to models intended for household use. Except for 16 and 17 year olds operating pizza-dough rollers constructed with safeguards to prevent fingers, hands, clothing from being caught on the in–running point of rollers, which have completely enclosed gears, and have microswitches that disengage machinery if the backs/sides of rollers removed. Exception does not apply to setting up, adjusting, repairing, oiling or cleaning of pizza-dough rollers.); In metal industries; In mines (Dangerous occupations in or around any mine, including all work performed in any underground working, open-pit, or surface part of any coal-mining plant, that contribute to the extraction, grading, cleaning or other handling of coal. Exceptions for 16-17 year olds: slate/refuse picking at picking table/chute in a tipple or breaker at a coal mine, work in office or repair/maintenance shops on the surface. For other mines all occupations prohibited, except may work in above-ground office, warehouse, supply house, change house, laboratory, repair/maintenance shops, in living quarters, outside mine in surveying, repair/maintenance of roads, general clean-up, track crew work for sections of railroad track when mining activities not being performed, work in or about surface placer mining operations other than place dredging operations and hydraulic placer mining operations. At metal mills other than in mercury-recovery mills or mills using cyanide process may operate jigs, sludge tables flotation cells, drier-filters, may perform hand-sorting at picking table/belt, general clean up. Exception, 14 and 15 year old minors may work in office and perform clerical duties.; In quarries (Most occupations, including drilling, shot firing or assisting in loading or tamping holes, face cleaning, attaching blocks to chains for cable hoisting, assisting/operating steam, air or electric shovels.); In the printing and paper industry; Around radioactive substances; On railroads and railways; On rivets (Heating and passing rivets, except for 16 and 17 year old minors 10 feet or less from ground or on a scaffold equipped with guardrails and board); In tanneries; Additional Prohibited Occupations for Minors Under 16: Amusement park ride attendant, operator, or dispatcher.; Baker and Cook; Boiler or engine room worker; Chicken catcher (Catching and cooping of poultry in preparation for transport or for market); Construction worker; Hoisting apparatus; Industrial homework; Lifeguard; Public messenger; Stzrike or lockouts (Prohibited to work in an establishment where a strike or lockout is in progress, unless the minor was legally certified to work in an establishment prior to the declaration of a strike or lockout.); Switchboard operator; Tobacco stripper or sorter; Transporting (Transportation of persons/property by rail, highway, air, water, pipeline, or other means.); Window cleaner; Youth peddling (Selling goods and services and promotional activities, except at the employer's place of business.); Minors Under 16 are also Prohibited from Working: In establishments where alcoholic beverages are produced, sold or dispensed (Except for continuing-care retirement homes, ski resorts, bowling alleys, golf courses, amusement parks and other similar recreational establishments where alcoholic beverages are served as long as the minor is not handling or serving alcohol, and not working in an area where alcohol is served or stored. Performing Arts students engaged in uncompensated exhibitions may perform at a licensed establishment, under proper supervision in accordance with the Liquor Code.); On coal dredges; In freezer or meat coolers; On highways; In manufacturing (Any manufacturing or mechanical process); On machinery; In pattern making shops; In the printing industry; For public utilities (In any capacity, except office work such as filing, typing and the cleaning and dusting of an office.); On scaffolding; On trucks, railcars, and conveyors; In tunnels; In warehousing and storage.; Work hour restrictions: Minors aged 14 or 15 may maximum work: 3 hours on a school day.; 18 hours in a school week. (26 hours if work is performed on Saturday and Sunday); 8 hours on a non-school day.; 40 hours in a non-school week.; Minors under 16 must have a written statement by the minor's parent or guardian acknowledging the duties and hours of employment and granting permission to work.; Minors aged 16 or 17 may maximum work: 8 hours on a school day.; 28 hours in a school week. (36 hours if work is performed on Saturday and Sunday); 10 hours on a non-school day.; 48 hours in a non-school week. / Child Labor Act; §§ 5(b)(4)(iv), 5(k), 34 Pa. Code § 11.1); (b)(4)(v); (b)(4)(i); (b)(4)(ii); § 4 (a)(1); § 4(a)(4); 34 Pa.; Code § 11.1; Code § 11.32, 29 CFR § 570.58; Code §§ 11.31, 11.35, 11.38; Code § 11.66, 29 CFR § 570.68; Code § 11.45; Code § 11.63; 29 CFR § 570.67; Code § 11.58; Code § 11.33; Code § 11.46; 29 CFR § 570.55; Code § 11.64, 29 CFR § 570.33; Code § 11.46; 29 CFR § 570.65; Code §§ 11.51. 11.55; Code § 11.49, 29 CFR § 570.59; Code §§ 11.34, 11.46, 29 CFR § 570.59; Code § 11.56; Code § 11.53; Code § 11.59; 29 CFR § 570.53; Code § 11.37; Code § 11.62; 29 CFR § 570.57; Code §§ 47.221 et seq; Code § 11.52; Code § 11.40; Code § 11.84; 43 P.S. § 491-3(f)); Code § 11.60; 29 CFR; § 570.64; § 570.54; § 570.52; § 570.65; § 570.62; 34 Pa. Code § 11.47; § 570.60; § 570.34; § 570.63; §§ 570.33(h)(l)(d)(h)(n)(1)(4)(c)(m)(g), 570.34(c)(l); § 570.34(l); Rhode Island / Under 16: Over 16: / Additional working restrictions: Under 16: Any manufacturing or mining job.; Processing occupations such as filleting of fish, dressing poultry, cracking nuts or laundering.; Occupations with duties in workplaces where goods are manufactured, mined or processed.; Operating or tending of hoisting apparatus or of any power-driven machinery (other than office machines and machines in retail, food service and establishments).; Occupations in connection with: a) Transportation of persons or property by rail, highway, air, on water, pipeline or other means; b) Warehousing and Storage; c) Communications and Public Utilities; d) Construction (including repair)+; Dispensing gasoline or other fuel; Docks, private or public; Parking lot attendants; Car washes either hand or machine; Occupations in billiard or poolrooms; Any work in a tunnel; All work using ladders or scaffolds; Work in freezers or meat coolers; (18: To serve, sell or handle alcohol) Work hour restrictions: Under 16: 14-15 may not be employed: During school hours.; Before 6:00 am or after 7:00 pm, except during school vacations when work is permitted until 9:00 pm; More than eight hours per day.; More than 40 hours per week.; Under 18: 16-17 may not be employed: More than 48 hours per week.; More than nine hours a day.; Before 6 am or AFTER 11:30 pm.; Without an 8-hour respite between the end of a shift on one day and the start of work the next day. / CHAPTER FIVE - CHILDREN ENTERING THE WORKPLACE AND EMPLOYMENT RIGHTS OF CHILDREN; § 86; § 87; § 91; § 96 (Serving, selling and handling alcohol); South Carolina / Unknown-Class article / Additional working restrictions: Minors under the age of 14: May generally not work. Exceptions: Minors under age 14 may work in any aspect of show business, such as acting or performing in a theatrical, television, radio, or film production.; Minors ages 12 and 13 may work during non-school sessions in non-hazardous farm jobs with written parental consent.; At any age, minors may work in any business or establishment solely owned and operated by the parent of the minor.; Minors under the age of 16: Minors ages 14 and 15 may work in office, clerical and sales jobs. They also may work in a number of jobs in retail, food service and gasoline service establishments, such as: Cashiering, price marking and tagging (by hand or machine); Assembling orders, packing and shelving.; Bagging and carrying out orders.; Serving foods and beverages.; Cleanup work.; Car washing and polishing; Operating gas pumps and performing other courtesy services; Cleaning vegetables and fruits and wrapping, sealing, labeling, weighing, pricing and stocking goods.; Delivery and errand work by foot, bicycle or public transportation.; Minors under the age of 18: May work unrestricted, exceptions: Manufacturing or storing explosives; Driving a motor vehicle and being an outside helper; Coal mining; Logging and sawmilling; Power-driven woodworking machines; Exposure to radioactive substances and to ionizing radiations; Power-driven hoisting apparatus; Power-driven metal-forming, punching and shearing machines; Mining, other than coal mining; Meat packing or processing; Power-driven bakery machines; Power-driven paper products machines; Manufacturing brick, tile, and related products; Power-driven circular saws, band saws and guillotine shears; Wrecking, demolition, and ship-breaking operations; Roofing operations; Excavation operations; Selling, serving or waitressing alcohol: In order to work as a bartender in any facility that sells open containers of alcohol, a person must be at least twenty-one years of age.; In order to work as a server, waiter or waitress and serve open containers of alcohol, a person must be at least eighteen years of age.; In order to work in any capacity in a retail liquor store, wholesale liquor business, or a distillery, a person must be at least twenty-one years of age.; Work hour restrictions: Under 16: Minors ages 14 and 15 may not work: During school hours.; Before 7 a.m. or after 7 p.m. (9 p.m. during the period of summer break of the school district in which the minor resides).; More than 18 hours during school weeks.; More than 3 hours on school days.; More than 40 hours in non-school weeks.; More than 8 hours on non-school days.; Under 18: Minors ages 16 and 17 - Unrestricted. / South Carolina Child Labor Statute: §41-13-20; 17 Hazardous Occupations Orders of the Fair Labor Standards Act; S.C. Code Ann. Sections: 20-7-370; 61-5-20(6); 61-13-340; South Dakota / Unknown-Class article / Additional working restrictions: Under 14: Minors under the age of 14 may only work in or as: Child actors; Jobs pumping gas or detasselling hybrid seed corn; Employment by parents; Employment necessary for the child's support or employment using agricultural equipment.; Under 16: Minors aged 14 or 15 may not work under following conditions: In any occupation dangerous to life, health or morals.; Under 18 Minors aged 16 or 17 - Unrestricted.; (Federal laws create requirements that are more stringent in many cases!): Selling, serving or waitressing alcohol: The age differs by license.; Off License: Malt Beverage License; Off-Sale, Malt Beverage License under 50% malt beverage sales: In order to sell beer in a grocery store, a person must be at least eighteen years of age.; Off-Sale, Malt Beverage License over 50% malt beverage sales: In order to sell, stock or handle sealed beer in a grocery store a person must be at least twenty-one years of age. (If the sale of alcoholic beverages constitutes more than fifty percent of the gross business transacted by the establishment); On/Off-Sale: Malt Beverage License; On/Off-Sale, Malt Beverage License-50% Alcohol Sales: The sale of malt beverages constitutes less than fifty percent of the gross business transacted by that establishment, an employee who is 18 years of age or older may sell, serve or dispense malt beverages as long as the licensee or an employee who is at least 21 years of age is on the premise. No one under the age of 21 may tend bar or draw or mix alcoholic beverages.; On/Off Sale, Malt Beverage License over 50% Alcohol Sales: If the gross business from the sale of malt beverages is over 50%, an employee selling the malt beverages must be at least 21 years of age.; On-Sale: Liquor License; On-Sale Liquor License under 50% Alcohol Sales: If less than 50% of the gross business is from the sale of alcohol, an employee age 18 or older may sell, serve or dispense alcoholic beverages as long as the licensee or an employee over the age of 21 is on the premise. No one under the age of 21 may tend bar or draw or mix alcoholic beverages.; On-Sale Liquor License over 50% Alcohol Sales: If the gross business from the sale of alcohol is over 50%, an employee selling the alcohol must be at least 21 years of age.; Package Liquor License; Package Liquor License under 50% Alcohol Sales: If less than 50% of the gross business is from the sale of alcohol, an employee age 18 or older may sell alcoholic beverages.; Package Liquor License over 50% Alcohol Sales: Sales of alcoholic beverages may only be made by a person who is at least 21 years of age.; On-Off Sale: Wine License; On-Off Sale Wine License under 50% Alcohol Sales: If less than 50% of the gross business is from the sale of wine, an employee age 18 or older may sell, serve or dispense the wine as long as the licensee or an employee over the age of 21 is on the premise. No one under the age of 21 may tend bar or draw or mix alcoholic beverages.; On/Off-Sale Wine License over 50% Alcohol Sales: If gross business from the sale of wine is over 50%, an employee selling the wine must be at least 21 years of age.; Work hour restrictions: Under 14: Minors under the age of 14 may not work: During school hours.; Later than 7 p.m.; Under 14: Minors under the age of 16 may not work: For more than four hours per school day or 20 hours per school week.; For more than eight hours per non-school day or 40 hours per non-school week.; Later than 10 p.m. on a school night.; Under 18: Minors aged 16 or 17 - Unrestricted.; (Federal laws create requirements that are more stringent in many cases!) / South Dakota Code (Child Labor); 60-12 (subsections 1-14); South Dakota Codes Title 35 - ALCOHOLIC BEVERAGES Chapter 04 - Sale Of Beverages; §35-4-79.1; §35-4-79; §35-4-79.3; §35-4-79; State laws: Tennessee–Wyoming, Puerto Rico: Federal state / Permission needed / Legal Working Age / Legislation; Tennessee / Under 18: Over 18: / Additional working restrictions: None - see federal laws. Work hour restrictions: Under 16: Minors aged 14 or 15 may not work: During school hours.; Between 7:00 p.m. and 7:00 a.m., if the next day is a school day.; Between 9:00 p.m. and 6:00 a.m..; More than 18 hours a week during a school week.; More than 8 hours a day on non-school days; or; More than 40 hours a week during non-school weeks.; Under 18: Minors aged 16 and 17 may not work: During those hours when the minor is required to attend classes.; Between the hours of 10:00 p.m. and 6:00 a.m., Sunday through Thursday evenings preceding a school day, except with parental or guardian consent. Then the minor may work until midnight no more than three nights Sunday through Thursday. Forms shall remain valid until the end of the school year in which it is submitted or until termination of employment, whichever shall occur first. / Tennessee Child Labor Act; Tennessee Alcoholic Beverage Act; Texas; Utah; Vermont; Virginia; Washington; West Virginia; Wisconsin; Wyoming; Puerto Rico	

== Asia ==
Country	Legal Working Age
China	Under 16: Article 61 states that an organization or individual may recruit a minor under the age of 16 if prescribed by the State. 16: Workers over 16 years old and under 18 years old are not allowed to work at commercial entertainment places, bars, internet service places and any other locations where activities are held that are not appropriate for minors. They are not to work in excessively harmful, heavy or toxic labor environments or any other dangerous operations. They are prohibited from working in any work that endangers their physical and mental health. The consent of parents or other guardians of the minor are required when they are participating in performances, program production and other activities. 18: (Unrestricted)
Hong Kong	13: Subject to restrictions and required to complete Form 3 secondary education. 15: Subject to restrictions for employment in industrial undertakings.
India	14: Restricted working hours and the type of work 21: (Unrestricted)
Indonesia	13: Minimum Employment age. 15: Restricted working hours and the type of work. 18: (Unrestricted)
Iran	15: Minimum employment age 18: Hard Work; 21: (Unrestricted)
Israel	14: Minimum employment age 15: Restricted working hours and the type of work 18: (Unrestricted)
Japan	Both sexes: Under 12: Film production and theatrical performance 12: Light work Under 15: Cannot work during school hours Male: 15: Restricted occupations and hours of activity 18: (Unrestricted) Female: 15: With broad restrictions for working hours and the type of work 18: May only participate in underground work if engaged in work specified by ordinance performed underground 20: (Unrestricted); Chapter 6, Articles 56–62
South Korea	Male: 15: Restricted working hours 19: (Unrestricted) Female: 15: Restricted working hours and the type of work. 18: Some limitations for work in overtly unhealthy conditions. 19: (Unrestricted); Articles 64 and 70–72 of the labour law implement the minimum age.
Macau	14: Work during summer holidays. 16: Subject to approval of Labour Affairs Bureau after consultation of Education and Youth Affairs Bureau, or after completion of compulsory education.
Malaysia	13: Light work (with restrictions). 15: Employment permitted (with restrictions); 18: (Unrestricted)
North Korea	16: By default
Philippines	15: (Restricted working hours and the type of work); 18: (Unrestricted)
Singapore	13: Generally, a child must be at least 13 years of age before they can start working. The minimum legal age for working in Singapore is governed by the Employment Act and the Employment (Children and Young Persons) Regulations, and is enforced by the Ministry of Manpower. 15: Young persons above 15 may work in an industrial environment. However, the employer must inform the Commissioner of Labour within 30 days of their employment, and submit a medical certificate certifying their fitness for work. 16: Generally speaking, a person who is above the age of 16 is not a child or a young person, and is considered an adult worker (Unrestricted).
Taiwan	15: A worker aged fifteen years old, shall be considered as a child worker. 16: No child worker and no worker aged sixteen or seventeen years old shall be permitted to do work that is potentially dangerous or hazardous in nature. 18: (Unrestricted)
Vietnam	15: By default
Thailand	15 (with registration to Labour Inspection Officer until 18)
Turkey	13: (Part-time employment; restricted to easy work); 15: (Unrestricted)
United Arab Emirates	15 (with some restrictions) 18 (unrestricted)
Yemen	14: Light work with restricted hours. 15: Industrial work. 18: (Unrestricted)

== Europe ==
Country	Legal Working Age
Albania	14: (Easy work performed at school holidays); 16: (Unrestricted)
Andorra	14: (Easy work performed at school holidays; Maximum 6 hours per day, with minimum 1 hours break; Minimum 2 following days of rest per week); 16: (Maximum 8 hours per day, with minimum 1 hours break; Minimum 2 following days of rest per week); 18: (Unrestricted)
Armenia	16: (Unrestricted; No person under the age of 16 is allowed to work in Armenia)
Austria	14: (With many restrictions within a family setting); 15: (With minor restrictions assuming compulsory school years have been finished); 18: Unrestricted
Belarus	14: Easy work with the permission from parents or legal guardians 16: Limited working hours up to 35 hours per week 18: Unrestricted
Belgium	15: (Must have completed 2 years of secondary education; restricted to light work); 16: (only light work); 18: Unrestricted
Bosnia and Herzegovina	15: (Restricted to light work; Restricted working hours); 18: (Unrestricted)
Bulgaria	13: (Only for jobs as film actor or model; Strictly regulated); 15: (Strictly regulated); 16 (Minimum working age; Some occupations prohibited); 18: (Unrestricted)
Croatia	15: (Restricted by the Labour laws); 18: (Unrestricted)
Cyprus	15: (Restricted by the Labour laws); 18: (Unrestricted)
Czech Republic	14: (Only under special circumstances); 15: (Restricted occupations and working hours); 18: (Unrestricted)
Denmark	None: (Only for activities in the cultural or artistic field. However, a police authorization must be obtained for these activities in advance.); 13: (Children 13–15 years of age may only perform light work, that is not in the vicinity of machinery. The working time may be on school days and up to 2 hours on other days up to 7 hours. In school-free weeks, the maximum working time must not exceed 35 hours per week.); 15: (Young people up to 18 years may not work in the following areas: with dangerous tools and equipment within hazardous work processes. The working time may not be between 18:00 und 6:00 on weekdays between 14:00 and 6:00 on holidays or Sundays. The maximum weekly working time must not exceed 40 hours.); 18: (Unrestricted)
Estonia	13: A Person aged 13 may work under restrictions and parental permission. 15: Minimum Employment age. Minors under the age of 18 are restricted with working hours and certain occupations. 18: Unrestricted.
Finland	14: Someone aged 14 may practise "light work". 15: Minimum Employment age. Minors under the age of 18 are restricted with working hours and certain occupations. 18: Unrestricted.
France	14: (only for light work, regulated by Code du travail; No working at night; Strict time limitation; Parental permission is needed); 16: (No working at night; Strict time limitation; Parental permission is needed); 18: (Unrestricted)
Germany	13: (with parental permission; and only easy work for example: paper round); 15: (Part-time work with less than 8 hours per day and maximum 40 hours per week; No work on weekends, statutory holidays and at night time or in an imperiling environment). Further restrictions for work break and minimum vacation days. 18: Unrestricted
Hungary	16: (The Hungarian Labour Code allows for the employment of people over 16 years old. Young workers apply a two-year period of protection: at the time of their working time must not exceed 8 hours. per day and forty hours per week. If you work a minimum of 4.5 hrs., They are entitled to 30 minutes. break, nor can they be employed on a night shift.); 18: (Unrestricted)
Iceland	13: (Only safe and easy work. Subject to restrictions on working time related to mandatory schooling.); 16: (Employers have a duty to protect young workers from working in difficult and dangerous conditions in some sectors also apply to restrictions on working time.); 18: (Unrestricted)
Ireland	14: (People aged under 16 years are not allowed to work full-time (full-time). The work of persons between the ages of 14 and 15 years must be obliged to comply with conditions: • perform light work during the holidays - a person must necessarily have then at least 21 days off work • work as part of the approved apprenticeship or training program. • work in the film, when cultural undertakings, in advertising, or in connection with sporting events.); 16: (People aged 16 and 17 years old can only work the hours between 6:00 and 22:00.); 18: (Unrestricted.)
Italy	15: (Restricted working hours and the type of work.); 18: (Unrestricted)
Latvia	15: (People between 15 and 18 years of age may work no more than 7 hours a day and 35 hours per week (including time learning - if they learn). There must they stay at work after hours or work at night. It is also prohibited to employ minors under conditions which may threaten their health, safety and morals. Workers under 18 years of age are entitled to a month's leave, in their case does not apply or trial periods.); 18: (Unrestricted)
Liechtenstein	14: (For light it is possible to hire 14-year-olds - but not longer than 9 hours per week during the school year and 15 hours a week during the holidays.); 15: (People aged over 15 but under 18 may work no more than 40 hours per week.); 18: (Unrestricted)
Lithuania	14: (Under certain conditions it is also possible to employ people aged over 14 years old but under 16 years of age. They have the right to perform easy work - during the school year for no more than two hours during the day and 12 hours a week during the holidays - 7 hours a day and 35 hours per week.); 16: (Persons who have completed 16 years but have not reached the age of majority have no right to work more than 8 hours per day and 36 hours per week.); 18: (Unrestricted)
Luxembourg	16
Malta	16: (Until they reach adulthood under the special protection of the law - are entitled to work up to 8 hours per day and 40 per week (included in is also a time of learning and training). Young worker has no right to do the work between the hours of 22 and 6 am.); 18: (Unrestricted)
Netherlands	13: (The minimum age of employment under the supervision and with no guarantee of a minimum wage.); 15: (The right to the minimum wage.); 16: (Persons over 16 years but less than 18 years, has most of the rights and obligations as workers age. However, you will not be able to work in harmful conditions - including noise, cramped quarters and with toxic substances.); 18: (Unrestricted)
Norway	13: (People aged over 13 but under 15 years of age may be employed only for light work that does not endanger the health, development, and does not interfere with learning.); 15: (Restricted working hours and the type of work.); 18: (Unrestricted)
Poland	None: (Cultural and artistic field); 15: (Light work only); 18: (Unrestricted)
Portugal	16: (Restricted working hours and the type of work.); 18: (Unrestricted)
Romania	15: (Restricted) 16: (Unrestricted)
Russia	None: (Artistic field only. Must have parental permission. Restricted working hours and shortened working week, must not interfere with school education or violate public morality) 14: (Light work only. Must have parental permission. Restricted working hours and shortened working week, must not interfere with school education); 16: (Light work only. Full school education required. Restricted working hours); 18: Unrestricted
Serbia	16: By default
Spain	None: Artistic activities with parental permission and a specific authorization of the labor department. 16: Parental permission is required. 18: Unrestricted
Sweden	None: (Only artistic field and some light risk free jobs. Must have parent permission. Restricted working hours and shortened working week.) 13: (Light work only. Must have parent permission. Restricted working hours and shortened working week.); 16: (Light work only. Restricted working hours); 18: (Unrestricted)
Switzerland	Age 13: (Must have parental permission; only easy work): During school weeks: Maximum 4 hours per day; and 9 hours per week.; During non-school weeks: Maximum 8 hours per day; and 40 hours per week.; Age 15: (Must have parental permission): Maximum 9 hours per day; and 45–50 hours per week. Working maximum until 8 p.m.; Age 16: Minimum age to serve someone in restaurants, café or hotels. Minimum age to work in a circus or cinema.: Working maximum until 10 p.m.; Age 18: Unrestricted (and the minimum age to work in: Bars, Discos, Dancinghalls and Nightclubs)
United Kingdom	None: (Artistic fields such as television, theatre and modelling) Age 14: Part-time Age 16: Full-time

== Oceania ==
Country	Legal Working Age	Further notes
Australia	Varies by state and territory. 13 (Queensland & Victoria; 11 when delivering newspapers, none for entertainment industries) 15 (Western Australia; most jobs, variations and restrictions apply for family businesses, entertainers/models, and newspaper delivery); No minimum working age (New South Wales, South Australia, Tasmania, Australian Capital Territory)	
New Zealand	14: Babysitting; 15: Limited vehicle work and hazardous workplaces (logging, construction, heavy lifting, dangerous goods); 16: Unrestricted working hours 20: Unrestricted	While there is no minimum age of work in New Zealand, there are multiple minimum ages of work for jobs with higher risk.
Papua New Guinea	16	

== See also ==
- Age of candidacy
- Child labour
- Critique of work
- Index of youth rights-related articles
- Minimum Age Convention, 1973
- School leaving age
- Student work
- Youth suffrage
- Youth rights
