= Student work =

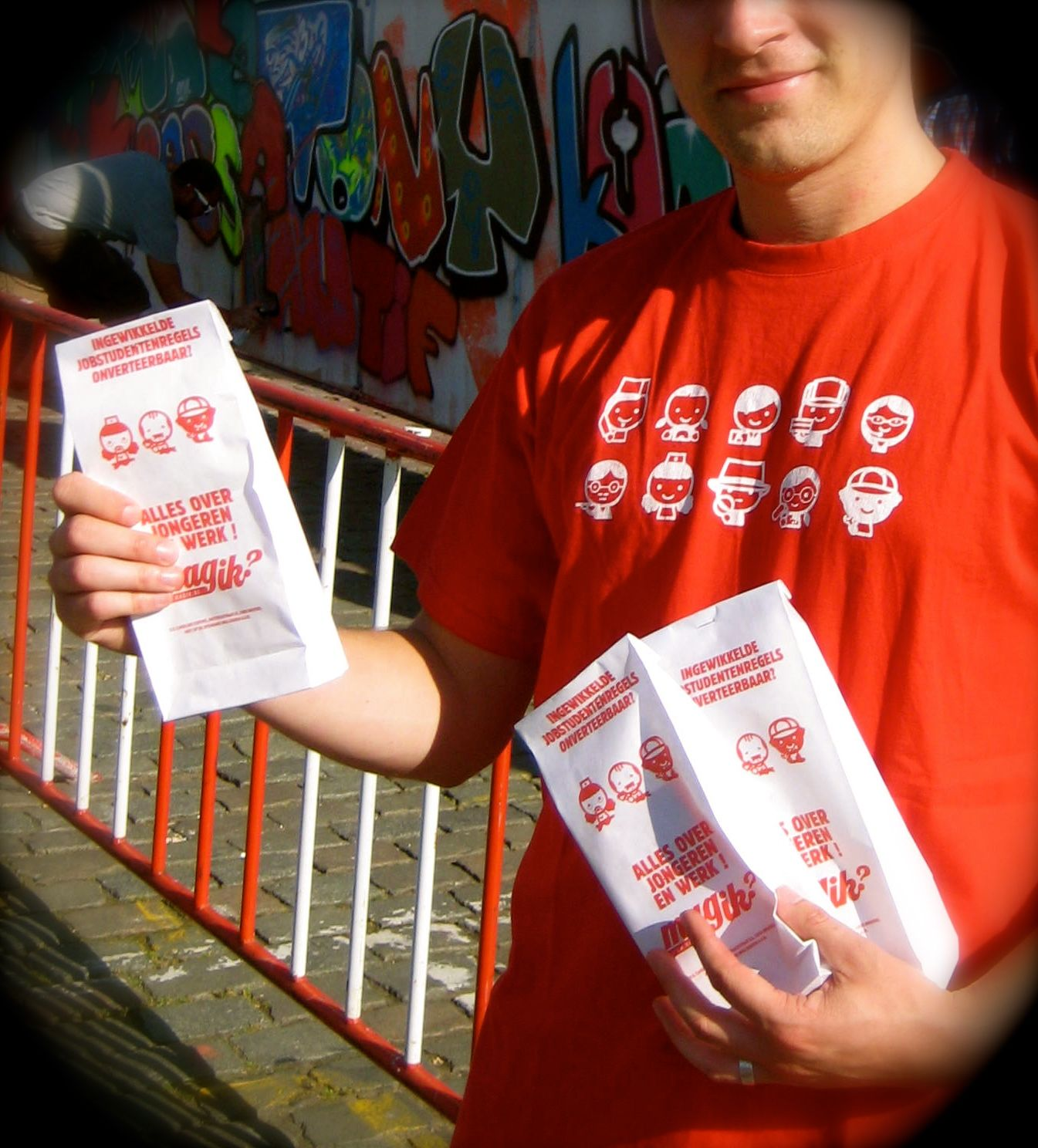
A campaigner in Belgium handing out information about student employment to young people in 2012

Student work, student job or holiday job is work that is done for payment by pupils or students during their school holidays or during their academic year.

Often this involves simple work. Sometimes it is just earning some extra pocket-money; others use it for additional funds while studying. For example, in Belgium, as a Dutch speaker, people choose a holiday job in Wallonia to improve their language skills, or as an economics student, they try to get a holiday job in the banking sector to gain experience.

Many countries have laws that restrict child labour and prohibit work done by people under age. However, there are normally exceptions that allow for a student jobs with limitations such as hours worked or age restriction during the teenage and adolescence years. Younger people may also have a reduced minimum wage level.

== Practice by country ==
=== Belgium ===
In Belgium, vacation work is prohibited for those under 15. Since 2003, student workers also have a legal status that offers them minimal social protection. For example, a special student contract must be drawn up.

As of 1 January 2012, the regulations on student employment changed as a result of the law of 28 July 2011 and the Royal Decree of 12 September 2011.

The following changes came into effect from then on:

- The number of days of student work per year is increased from 46 to 50 days per year,

=== The Netherlands ===
In the Netherlands, the trade union has a special department for holiday workers. In the Netherlands, holiday work is allowed from the age of 14, but at a young(er) age, one has special rights and one is not allowed to do dangerous work.

=== Austria ===
In Austria, there are three forms of summer employment. Summer interns complete a mandatory internship, which is stipulated in the curriculum or study regulations to complement their training. The holiday worker works during the holiday period purely to earn income, without further educational background. The volunteer works voluntarily and without pay in a company in preparation for future professional activity.

== See also ==
- Federal Public Service Employment
- Internship
- Apprenticeships
