= Federal Public Service Employment =

The FPS Employment, Labour and Social Dialogue (Dutch: FOD Werkgelegenheid, Arbeid en Sociaal Overleg, French: SPF Emploi, Travail et Concertation sociale, German: FÖD Beschäftigung, Arbeit und Soziale Konzertierung), more commonly referred to as the FPS Employment or the FPS Labour, is a Federal Public Service of Belgium. It was created by Royal Order on 3 February 2002, as part of the plans of the Verhofstadt I Government to modernise the federal administration. It is responsible for managing labour relations, ensuring the protection and promotion of occupational well-being, and participating in the development of social legislation.

The FPS Employment, Labour and Social Dialogue is responsible to the Federal Minister of Employment.

== Organisation ==
The FPS Employment, Labour and Social Dialogue is organised into six Directorates-General:

- The Directorate General for Collective Labour Relations
- The Directorate General for Individual Labour Relations
- The Directorate General for Supervision of Social Legislation
- The Directorate General for Humanisation of Labour
- The Directorate General for Supervision of Occupational Well-being
- The Directorate General for Employment and Labour Market
