= Independent contracting in the United States =

An independent contractor is a person, business, or corporation that provides goods or services under a written contract or a verbal agreement. Unlike employees, independent contractors do not work regularly for an employer but work as required, when they may be subject to law of agency. Independent contractors are usually paid on a freelance basis. Contractors often work through a limited company or franchise, which they themselves own, or may work through an umbrella company.

In the United States, any company or organization engaged in a trade or business that pays more than $600 to an independent contractor in one year is required to report this to the Internal Revenue Service (IRS) as well as to the contractor, using Form 1099-NEC. This form includes the money paid, contractor's name, social security number, address, phone number, and an indicator about the existence of foreign bank accounts; independent contractors do not have income taxes withheld like employees. The form has also led to use of the phrase "1099 workers" or "the 1099 economy" to refer to the independent contractors themselves.

== Versus employee ==
The distinction between independent contractor and employee is an important one in the United States, as the costs for business owners to maintain employees are significantly higher than the costs associated with hiring independent contractors, due to federal and state requirements for employers to pay FICA (Social Security and Medicare taxes) and unemployment taxes on received income for employees. Likewise, employees are protected from being fired without cause, and if fired or let go for other reasons are entitled to unemployment benefits, whereas independent contractors have neither protection nor entitlement. Employees are also entitled to receive overtime pay for work performed over the 40-hour-per-week standard, whereas independent contractors may work any number of hours (including far above this standard) with no change in pay.

In the early 1990s, the IRS methodically began to look for employers who were misclassifying employees as independent contractors, and has since obtained billions of dollars in Social Security back taxes. Recently, worker classification initiatives have been a top priority for the IRS, the Department of Labor, and state agencies. In 2011, the IRS and the Department of Labor entered into a memorandum of understanding in an effort to jointly increase worker misclassification audits.

The United States Supreme Court has offered the following guidelines to distinguish employees from independent contractors:

1. The extent to which services are integral to the employer's business. Greater integration favors an employee-employer relationship.
2. The permanence of the relationship. More established relationships favor employee status.
3. The amount of investment in equipment. When a worker makes a significant investment in the equipment they use in working for someone else, this suggests an independent contractor relationship.
4. The degree of control by the principal. More control favors employee-employer status.
5. The amount of financial risk. More opportunity for profit or loss favors an independent contractor relationship.
6. The amount of initiative, judgment or foresight in open-market competition with others required for the success of the claimed independent enterprise. Entrepreneurial and distinctive work favors an independent contractor relationship.

The IRS, for federal income tax, applies a "right to control test" which considers the nature of the working relationship. They highlight three general aspects of the employment arrangement:

1. financial control
2. behavioral control
3. relationship between the parties

In general, their criteria parallel those of the Supreme Court in sentiment. They include guidelines such as the amount of instruction, training, integration, use of assistants, length of professional relationship, regularity of work, location of work, payment schedule, source of funds for business expenditures, right to quit, and financial risk more typically seen with each work category. In their framework, independent contractors retain control over schedule and hours worked, jobs accepted, and performance monitoring. They also can have a major investment in equipment, furnish their own supplies, provide their own insurance, repairs, and other expenses related to their business. They may also perform a unique service that is not in the normal course of business of the employer. This contrasts with employees, who usually work at the schedule required by the employer, and whose performance the employer directly supervises. Independent contractors can also work for multiple firms, and offer their services to the general public.

The distinction between independent contractors and employees is not always clear, and continues to evolve. For example, some independent contractors may work for a number of different organizations throughout the year, while others retain independent contractor status although they work for the same organization the entire year. Other companies, for example in the freight transport industry, specify the schedule for the independent contractor, require purchase of vehicles from the company and prohibit work for other companies.

In July 2015, the U.S. Department of Labor issued new guidelines on the misclassification of employees as independent contractors. "A worker who is economically dependent on an employer is suffered or permitted to work by the employer. Thus, applying the economic realities test in view of the expansive definition of "employ" under the Act, most workers are employees under the Fair Labor Standards Act."

... the economic realities of the relationship, and not the label an employer gives it, are determinative. Thus, an agreement between an employer and a worker designating or labeling the worker as an independent contractor is not indicative of the economic realities of the working relationship and is not relevant to the analysis of the worker's status.

== Specific occupations ==
Examples of occupations where independent contractor arrangements are typical:

- Accountant
- Actor
- Adjunct professor
- Architect
- Artist
- Athlete
- Auctioneer
- Author
- Barber or hair stylist
- Bookkeeper
- Boxer
- Caddie
- Cheerleader
- Consultant
- Courier
- Court reporter
- Dry cleaner
- Engineer
- Entertainer
- Fashion model
- Freelance photographer
- Gardener
- General contractor
- General practitioner
- Hairdresser
- IT professional
- Interpreter or translator
- Juror
- Lawn-care worker
- Lawyer
- Lifeguard
- Market stall
- Mason
- Massage therapist
- Medical doctor
- MMA Fighter
- Musician
- Nurse
- Newspaper carrier
- Paid speaker
- Personal trainer
- Pornographic film actor
- PGA golfer
- Swimming pool service technician
- Private investigator
- Private military company
- Prostitute
- Radio presenter (in radio jargon referred to as a "swing jock")
- Security guard
- Internet sysop
- Office clerk
- Producer (film)
- Professional wrestler
- Professional athlete
- Real-estate agent
- Sales representative
- Snow removal
- Sports official
- Stockbroker
- Stripper / Exotic dancer
- Talent agent
- Tattoo artist
- Taxi driver or limousine driver
- Technical writer
- Telephone and live-chat psychic
- Tradesman
- Truck driver/operator
- Tutor
- User experience consultant
- User interface designer
- Writer

== Advantages and disadvantages ==
Independent contracting has both benefits and drawbacks to contractors.

=== Advantages ===
- Since they are rarely tied to an employer, they are free to set their own rules of business, limited only by bargaining power.
- Since they usually develop a large network of clients, the loss of one or two often has a negligible effect.
- Many people simply like the idea of "being your own boss." Aside from materialistic benefits, many people simply enjoy not having to answer to a supervisor.
- As an artist/author of any tangible artwork, such as paintings, sculptures, photographs, or written works, a person is entitled to exclusive copyright ownership if they created the work as an independent contractor. If the person created such works while in the employ of another person or corporation, the rights belong to the employer (under most standard employment contracts).

Firms in the sharing economy such as Uber can gain substantial advantages via the misclassification of employees as independent contractors.

=== Disadvantages ===
- In the United States, an Internal Revenue Service computer algorithm matches individuals with Form 1099s to the company that pays them. If an independent contractor reports more than $10,000 of earnings, or majority of income from a single source, the IRS is likely to question the independence of the worker, and investigate the company that issued the Form 1099.
- Employer misclassification of employees as independent contractors either inadvertently or to avoid taxation and regulation, is widespread. Additionally, contractorization has been used as an indirect form of union-busting.
- An independent contractor can itself be a business with employees; however, in most cases in the United States independent contractors operate as a sole proprietorship or single-member limited liability company. This means the independent contractor, as a business owner, incurs its own expenses to provide the contracted service, must acquire its own equipment to perform the service, and is responsible for business filings such as income tax returns.
- Independent contractors are responsible for their own self-employment tax, which consists of both halves of the FICA tax amount. An employee only pays the employee portion of the FICA tax. Self-employment taxes are not withheld from the earnings of independent contractors who are required to voluntarily declare and pay estimated earnings taxes to the IRS, which can lead to a trap for contractors who run into financial difficulty and become tempted to put off making the required estimated tax payments.
- There are several monetary incentives that are guaranteed to employees in the United States, but not independent contractors. Examples include worker's compensation and unemployment insurance; but independent contractors are allowed to make Individual Retirement Account contributions.
- In many jurisdictions, occupational safety and health regulations are less comprehensive for independent contractors.

== Independent contracting in tort ==
The employer of an independent contractor is generally not held vicariously liable for the tortious acts and omissions of the contractor, because the control and supervision found in an employer–employee or principal–agent relationship is lacking. However, vicarious liability will be imposed in some circumstances:

1. where the contractor injures an invitee to the real property of the employer,
2. the contractor is involved in an ultra-hazardous activity (one likely to cause substantial injury, such as blasting with explosives), or
3. the employer is estopped from denying liability because he has held out the independent contractor as if he were simply an employee or agent.
4. the employer is involved in an operation subject to obligations imposed by a public authority

== Alternatives ==
Due to the higher expense of maintaining employees, many employers needing to transition from independent contractors to employees may find the switch difficult. There is a transitional status for employees as an alternative to independent contracting known as being a statutory employee. Statutory employees are less expensive to hire than classic employees because the employer does not have to pay unemployment tax. But they are more expensive than independent contractors because Social Security and Medicare taxes must be paid on wages. Similarly to independent contractors, statutory employees can deduct their trade or business expenses from their W2 earnings.

=== Dependent contractor ===
A growing number of workers do not neatly fit the government's categorizations of independent contractors and statutory employees, and are increasingly being classified as dependent contractors. Some of these contingent workforce—independent contractors, temporary workers, and part-time workers, who work when and for how long they want, such as those who work for such companies as Uber, Handybook, Inc., and CrowdFlower—have filed lawsuits that argue that companies that substantially control workers' work and behaviors while working (such as at Handybook, Inc.: when to knock on customers' doors vs. ring the doorbells, and how to use the customers' bathrooms) should be covered by minimum-wage and overtime rules under the Fair Labor Standards Act, as well as receive other traditional employee protections. Wilma Liebman, former chairperson of the National Labor Relations Board, has observed that Canada and Germany have such protections in place for contingent workers. And UK Prime Minister David Cameron has appointed an overseer for freelance workers in that country, to determine how the government should support freelance workers.

== See also ==
- Capital gains tax in the United States
- Contingent workforce
- Corporate tax in the United States
- E-lancing
- Federal Insurance Contributions Act tax
- Freelance marketplace
- General contractor
- Independent test organization
- Inside contracting
- Internal Revenue Service
- Misclassification of employees as independent contractors
- National Independent Contractors Association
- Outsourcing
- Payroll taxes in the United States
- Performance bond
- Real estate trends
- Subcontractor
- Gig worker
- Tax Day
- Tax evasion in the United States
- Tax preparation
- Taxation in the United States
