= Independent contractor (disambiguation) =

An Independent contractor is a type of worker.

Independent contractor may also refer to:

- Contingent work – Non-permanent type of employment
- Freelancer – Self-employed worker with no committed employer
- General contractor – Construction manager
- Gig worker – Independent on-demand temporary workers
- Self-employment – State of working for oneself
- Sole proprietorship – Business legally synonymous with its owner

== See also ==
- Independent contracting in the United States
- Independent Contractors Australia
- Independent contractor-employee distinction – Situation in which a person registered as self-employed or a temp is legally an employee
- Independent contractor-employee distinction in the United States – Misclassification of independent contractors
- National Independent Contractors Association
