= Association of Independent Professionals and the Self-Employed =

- Abbreviation: IPSE
- Predecessor: Professional Contractors Group (PCG)
- Formation: 1999
- Type: Not-for-profit membership association
- Legal status: Company limited by guarantee
- Headquarters: London, United Kingdom
- Board Chair: Robert Light
- Chief Executive: Vicks Rodwell
- Website: ipse.co.uk
- Remarks: Registered in England and Wales, no. 03770926

The Association of Independent Professionals and the Self-Employed (IPSE), also known as The Self-Employed Association, is a British not-for-profit membership organisation representing freelancers, independent contractors, sole traders and other self-employed professionals across the United Kingdom. It is UK's only not-for-profit membership association dedicated exclusively to the self-employed.

Founded in 1999 as the Professional Contractors Group (PCG), a protest organisation formed in direct response to the introduction of the IR35 tax legislation. IPSE has since broadened its scope to represent the full spectrum of the UK's self-employed population, estimated at 4.3 million people. The organisation campaigns on behalf of the self-employed before Parliament and government, publishes independent research on self-employment and freelancing and provides its members with insurance cover, tax and legal helplines, template contracts and professional community.

It is a company limited by guarantee, owned and run by its members. In September 2014 the PCG changed its name to IPSE

== Issues on which IPSE (formerly PCG) has campaigned ==
- IR35: PCG challenged this legislation with a Judicial Review and continues to lobby for its replacement. In November 2010 Chris Bryce, then Chairman of PCG, took up a seat on the consultative committee of the small business taxation group of the Office of Tax Simplification.
- S660A: PCG took the first test case (Arctic Systems) on this issue - the admissibility of husband-and-wife businesses for tax purposes - through the courts and won. It continues to lobby government against changes aimed at restoring HMRC’s interpretation of the statute.
- Managed Service Company legislation: PCG campaigned to ensure that the legislation was not unfairly applied to companies outside the intended target.
- IR591: In his Pre-Budget Report of 2003, Gordon Brown announced plans for a new tax measure aimed at freelance contractors, but did not publish any details for consultation. PCG lobbied the government extensively and launched a public campaign: the resulting measure, a 19% corporation tax rate for firms with profits of less than £50,000 and the abolition of the zero starting rate introduced a couple of years previously, was the "least worst" of all possible outcomes.
- Agency Regulations: in 2002 the government introduced a set of regulations covering all workers who acquire work via recruitment agencies. PCG negotiated successfully to secure an opt-out from the regulations for contractors.
- Software patents: although not an IT specific organisation, PCG responded to the concern expressed by its members in IT at the proposed directive on the patentability of computer-implemented inventions, commonly referred to as the software patents directive. As the UK's IT bodies were all in favour of software patents, PCG campaigned against the directive. The European Parliament rejected the directive on 6 July 2005.
- Work permits: from 2000, the IT contracting market became depressed, yet the government still listed IT as an area in which skills shortage existed and therefore gave prioritised entry to the UK for IT workers from overseas. Lobbying by PCG led to IT being removed from the skills shortage list in 2002.
- Offshoring: PCG has undertaken the first empirical study of the effects of offshoring (whereby a company's IT services, for instance, are performed by a service provider in another country), which suggests that the cost benefits promised on paper often fail to materialise in practice. PCG is campaigning on this issue because the UK's IT bodies do not see it as a problem, although it is increasingly also becoming an issue in other sectors represented by PCG.
- Abuse of the intra-company transfer rules by major corporations in the UK. The PCG alleged that some companies are misusing the immigration rules that allow company employees to enter the UK. A campaign website (www.ictabuse.org.uk) has been set up to explain the allegations in detail.
- Encouraging the use of Freelance workers within industry. PCG run a campaign to promote the use of freelance workers called Britain's Brain Gain.

=== Organisation and structure ===
IPSE is a company limited by guarantee, governed by a board of directors responsible for the organisation's strategic direction. The board must be composed of a majority of directors elected by the membership. Directors serve a maximum of two consecutive three-year terms and may be either appointed by the board or elected by members The board must be composed of a majority of directors elected by the membership. The election of directors, and the rules for the election, are set by the current board of directors who can veto the candidacy of any member for any reason. The chief executive officer is a director by virtue of their appointment to the office of CEO.

IPSE's staff are accountable to the board of directors.

IPSE's executive team manages day-to-day operations and is accountable to the board. The organisation employs approximately 51–100 staff

=== Member Services ===
IPSE offers its members a range of services as part of its membership package. These include

- Tax and legal helplines
- Insurance cover against disputes with His Majesty's Revenue and Customs
- Access to members-only discussion forums
- Standard template contracts
- Extensive guidance documents on IR35, S660A, agency regulations and how to go about setting up as a freelance contractor

IPSE runs a number of schemes for the benefit of its members.

==== Membership Categories ====
IPSE offers five membership categories, each designed to reflect a different form of self-employment.

- Director - IPSE's flagship tier, targeted at contractors and consultants operating via a limited company or Personal Service Company (PSC). Includes full tax investigation cover of up to £100,000 in legal fees, IR35 contract review, income protection, and access to specialist IR35 guidance and helplines.
- Freelancer - designed for sole traders and freelancers. Provides illness and injury cover, jury service cover, contract failure protection, and tax and VAT investigation cover of up to £50,000 in legal fees and £250 per day loss of earnings (up to £750).
- Umbrella - introduced in 2023 for contractors working via umbrella companies. Provides run-off IR35 enquiry cover for historic contracts, protection against umbrella company default, jury service cover, and tax investigation cover.
- Kickstart - includes all Community benefits, plus access to the IPSE Incubator (a 12-month structured programme for those launching a self-employed business) and illness and injury income protection cover.
- Community - an entry-level tier providing access to IPSE's knowledge resources, template contracts, tax and legal helplines, co-working spaces via a partnership with AndCo, the member directory, and IPSE's online community. Open to anyone interested in self-employment, including those who are not yet trading.

All membership tiers include access to IPSE's tax and legal helplines, template contracts, member directory, co-working, and IPSE events. IPSE also provides 1-2-1 Success Sessions matching members with experienced practitioners for advice on business development, finance, and other topics.

=== Campaigns and policy positions ===
==== IR35 and off-payroll working ====
IR35 has remained IPSE's primary policy concern since the organisation's foundation. IPSE has consistently called for the 2017 and 2021 off-payroll working reforms to be repealed, arguing that shifting the responsibility for determining IR35 status from contractors to end clients has caused widespread market disruption, led to blanket bans on outside-IR35 engagement, and forced contractors into umbrella company arrangements.

IPSE has proposed alternatives to IR35, including a form of Engager's National Insurance and the creation of a new company structure - a Freelancer Limited Company (FLC) - that would provide certainty about employment and tax status for both contractors and clients.

IPSE has engaged with all major UK political parties on IR35. It published a General Election 2024 manifesto for the self-employed, met with Reform UK MPs regarding that party's manifesto pledge to scrap IR35, and has held quarterly meetings with the Small Business Minister and Downing Street advisers.

==== Employment status ====
IPSE has long advocated for a statutory definition of self-employment, arguing that the absence of a clear legal definition creates uncertainty and fuels disputes between contractors and HMRC. IPSE proposed the adoption of a Self-Employment Matrix as a tool to accurately categorise and define self-employment and submitted written proposals to the Labour Party's National Policy Forum in this regard.

==== Umbrella company regulation ====
IPSE has campaigned for stronger regulation of the umbrella company market, citing risks to contractors from non-compliant operators and disguised remuneration schemes. IPSE submitted written evidence to the government's 2021 call for evidence on the umbrella market and facilitated a virtual meeting between umbrella company workers and HMRC to provide direct member testimony to policymakers.

==== Self-employed parental pay ====
IPSE has campaigned for equivalent maternity, paternity, and adoption leave support for the self-employed, noting that self-employed individuals are not entitled to statutory parental pay and face significant income disruption when starting a family.

==== Late payment ====
IPSE has campaigned for reform of late payment rules to protect freelancers and small businesses from clients delaying payment for services rendered.

=== Research and publications ===
IPSE publishes independent research on self-employment and the freelance labour market, which it uses to inform its advocacy work and provide market intelligence to members, policymakers, and the media.

==== Freelancer Confidence Index ====
IPSE's Freelancer Confidence Index (FCI) is a quarterly survey tracking business confidence, day rates, capacity utilisation, and economic outlook among UK freelancers. The FCI has been published continuously since 2014, making it one of the longest-running datasets on the UK freelance sector.

Key findings from recent editions include: freelancer business confidence falling for four successive quarters to Q3 2024, with 88 per cent of freelancers reporting they do not feel supported by the UK government average day rates standing at £576 in Q3 2024 following a significant drop to £457 in Q2 2024 and government tax policy consistently cited as the single largest negative factor on freelancers' businesses.

==== IR35 Spotlight ====
The IR35 Spotlight is an annual report tracking the impact of the off-payroll working reforms on the contractor market. The 2024 report, based on a survey of over 1,300 contractors found that one in ten contractors were out of work attributable to IR35, and that nearly a quarter planned to seek contracts abroad. The findings were covered by the Financial Times and The Daily Telegraph and were cited by backbench MPs in parliamentary debate.

The 2025 report found that the proportion of engagements determined as outside IR35 had fallen to 70 per cent, compared to 80 per cent in both 2024 and 2023, indicating continued market tightening for outside-IR35 roles.

==== Self-Employed Landscape Report ====
IPSE's annual Self-Employed Landscape Report tracks the size and composition of the UK's self-employed population. The 2021 edition reported that the number of solo self-employed workers had fallen by five per cent to 4.1 million, following a 15 per cent increase in Universal Credit claims by self-employed workers between 2020 and 2021.

==== Other research ====
IPSE has also published research and campaign reports on disabled self-employment, mental and physical wellbeing in self-employment, parental pay for the self-employed, late payment culture, and training and skills access.
