= Statutory employee =

Contractor status under American common law

A statutory employee is an independent contractor under American common law who is treated as an employee, by statute, for purposes of tax withholdings. For a standard independent contractor, an employer cannot withhold taxes. Statutory employees are also permitted to deduct work-related expenses on IRS Schedule C instead of Schedule A in the United States tax system. As a result, they are allowed a greater tax deduction for business expenses than standard employees, as Schedule C expenses are not subject to the 2% adjusted gross income threshold as seen with Schedule A.

== Criteria ==
For an individual to be considered a statutory employee, all of the following conditions must apply:

1. Services must be personally performed by the individual.
2. The individual does not have substantial investment in the equipment and property used to perform the services.
3. The services are performed on a continuing basis for the same payer.

Some examples of persons who may be considered statutory employees are as follows:

1. A driver distributing non-dairy beverages, meat, vegetable, fruit, or baked goods; or who picks up laundry, if he acts as an agent or is paid by commission.
2. A life insurance agent whose main business is life insurance and annuity for one company.
3. Someone who works from home on materials an employer supplies, that must be returned and for which the employer gives work specifications.
4. A traveling salesperson who turns in orders from wholesalers, retailers, contractors, hotels, or restaurants, either for resale or business use. Work performed must be the principal business activity of the employee.

== Advantages over standard employee ==
Statutory employees occupy an intermediate position between employees and independent contractors from the perspective of the employer. Statutory employees are less expensive to hire than regular employees because the employer does not have to pay unemployment taxes. However, such employees are more expensive to hire than independent contractors because Social Security and Medicare taxes must be paid on wages in the form of FICA tax. Statutory employees pay FICA tax through their employer, and so do not pay self-employment tax; despite this, they must report expenses, income and wage.

Similar to independent contractors, statutory employees may deduct business expense from W-2 earnings.

== See also ==
- Independent contractor-employee distinction in the United States
- Subcontractor
- Taxation in the United States
- Payroll taxes in the United States
- Federal Insurance Contributions Act tax
- Corporate tax in the United States
- Internal Revenue Service
- Tax evasion in the United States
- Performance bond
- General contractor
- Contingent workforce
- Inside contracting
- Independent test organization
- Freelance marketplace
