= Subcontractor =

Person or business performing part of another's contract

A subcontractor is a person or business which undertakes to perform part or all of the obligations of another's contract, and a subcontract is a contract which assigns part of an existing contract to a subcontractor.

A general contractor, prime contractor or main contractor may hire subcontractors to perform specific tasks as part of an overall project to reduce costs or to mitigate project risks. In employing subcontractors, the general contractor hopes to receive the same or better service than the general contractor could have provided by itself, at lower overall risk.

The European Union has recognised the need to make provision for sub-contracting in its rules on public procurement, as arrangements for sub-contracting can support the EU's drive to involve more small and medium-sized undertakings in the provision of goods and services for the public sector.

== Definition ==
United States public acquisition regulations contain a number of distinct definitions of "subcontract" and "subcontractor", with calls for a consolidated definition to be adopted.

== Types ==
Subcontracting arrangements arise in a number of contexts including construction, engineering and other fields.

In United Kingdom building industry contract law, particularly when using JCT standard form contracts, three subcontractor types are identified:

Domestic subcontractor
A subcontractor who contracts with the main contractor to supply or fix any materials or goods or execute work forming part of the main contract. Essentially this contractor is employed by the main contractor.
Nominated subcontractor
Certain contracts permit the architect or supervising officer to reserve the right of the final selection and approval of subcontractors. The main contractor is permitted to make a profit from the use of nominated subcontractors on site, but must provide "attendance" (usually the provision of water, power, restrooms, and other services to enable the nominated subcontractor to do his job). In effect the appointment of nominated subcontractors establishes a direct contractual relationship between the client and the subcontractor.
Named subcontractors
Effectively the same as a domestic subcontractor — a subcontractor who contracts with the main contractor to supply or fix any materials or goods or execute work forming part of the main contract. Essentially this contractor is employed by the main contractor.

Where companies work together to plan how they will meet a client need, with a view to subcontracting some areas of service delivery to one of the partners, they may enter into a teaming agreement which defines their contribution to the client bid and the proposed subcontracting to be put in place if the bid is successful. The teaming agreement acts as an interim agreement between them, which would generally be transformed into a formal sub-contracting agreement once a contract has been signed or an order for delivery has been placed. Under US federal acquisition rules, the term "contractor team arrangements" is used to define and recognize such agreements, and also applies where partners form a partnership or joint venture to act collectively as a single contracting body. Erin Toomey has noted that a teaming agreement only applies to a specific client tender and therefore needs to be renegotiated for any further occasion when it may potentially be used.

== Contracting law ==
An obligation to award a subcontract to a named subcontractor can arise, where a bidding process names a subcontractor as an intended partner and a prime contract is subsequently awarded to the contractor by the client. In a 2002 Canadian case, A. Dynasty Roofing (Windsor) Ltd. v. Marathon Construction Services (1991) Inc., the Ontario Superior Court held that when Marathon Construction Services, a general contractor in the construction industry, had bid for a contract to construct an industrial building in January 1999, it had named Dynasty and another roofing company, Smith Peat, as the subcontractors who would be employed for the roofing work. Prices had been submitted by both Dynasty and Smith Peat, both were held to be capable of doing the work, and Dynasty's prices were the lowest submitted. However, on being awarded the prime contract, Marathon agreed a lower price with Smith Peat and offered them the subcontract. The court held that Marathon were obliged to subcontract with Dynasty, and the Court of Appeal for Ontario upheld the ruling in October 2003.

== Tax law ==
Under UK tax law, certain activities that might appear to be subcontracting are actually treated differently. This is a subtlety of corporate taxation that may easily be missed or misunderstood, and may be relevant to research and development tax relief. Examples of activities that involve outsourced work that do not count as subcontracting for tax purposes include:

- Collaborative research – research carried out across two companies that benefits both companies.
- Externally provided workers
- Self-employed consultants.

== Payment clauses ==
Some contractors appoint subcontractors to work under a "pay when paid" clause, sometimes called a "pay if paid" clause, where the general contractor will work with subcontractors and the subcontractors are only paid if and when the general contractor is paid for the work. An example clause from a construction context reads:

Subcontractor agrees that all progress payments and final payment to Subcontractor are contingent upon and subject to Owner's acceptance of Subcontractor's work and upon contractor's receipt of payment from Owner. Subcontractor agrees to accept the risk of non-payment if Contractor is not paid progress payments and/or final payment from Owner, for any reason. Subcontractor further agrees that Owner's payment to Contractor of all progress payments and final payment for any work performed by Subcontractor, other Subcontractors and Contractor shall be an express condition precedent to any obligation of Contractor to make any progress payment, retainages, or final payment to Subcontractor, and Subcontractor hereby waives all right to commence litigation or arbitration until payment is made to Contractor.

However, in the case of Avon Brothers, Inc. v. Tom Martin Construction Company, Inc., the New Jersey Superior Court, Appellate Division ruled in 2000 that a pay when paid clause represents an unconditional promise to pay, merely permitting payment to be postponed for a reasonable time, and not a condition precedent which would completely excuse the contractor's obligation to pay even though not paid themselves. Under Florida construction law, a pay when paid clause is unenforceable unless it unambiguously transfers the risk of non-payment to the subcontractor. The common usage and generally shared intent of pay-when-paid clauses in the Florida construction industry was recognised by the Florida Supreme Court in Peacock Construction Co. v Modern Air Conditioning, Inc., 353 so 2d 840 (Florida 1977), even though the contractual language used may vary from case to case.

== See also ==
- elancing
- False self-employment
- Freelance marketplace
- General contractor (aka prime contractor)
- Independent test organization
- Inside contracting
- List of construction occupations
- Misclassification of employees as independent contractors
- Outsourcing
