= Wage theft =

Denial of wages or employee benefits rightfully owed to an employee

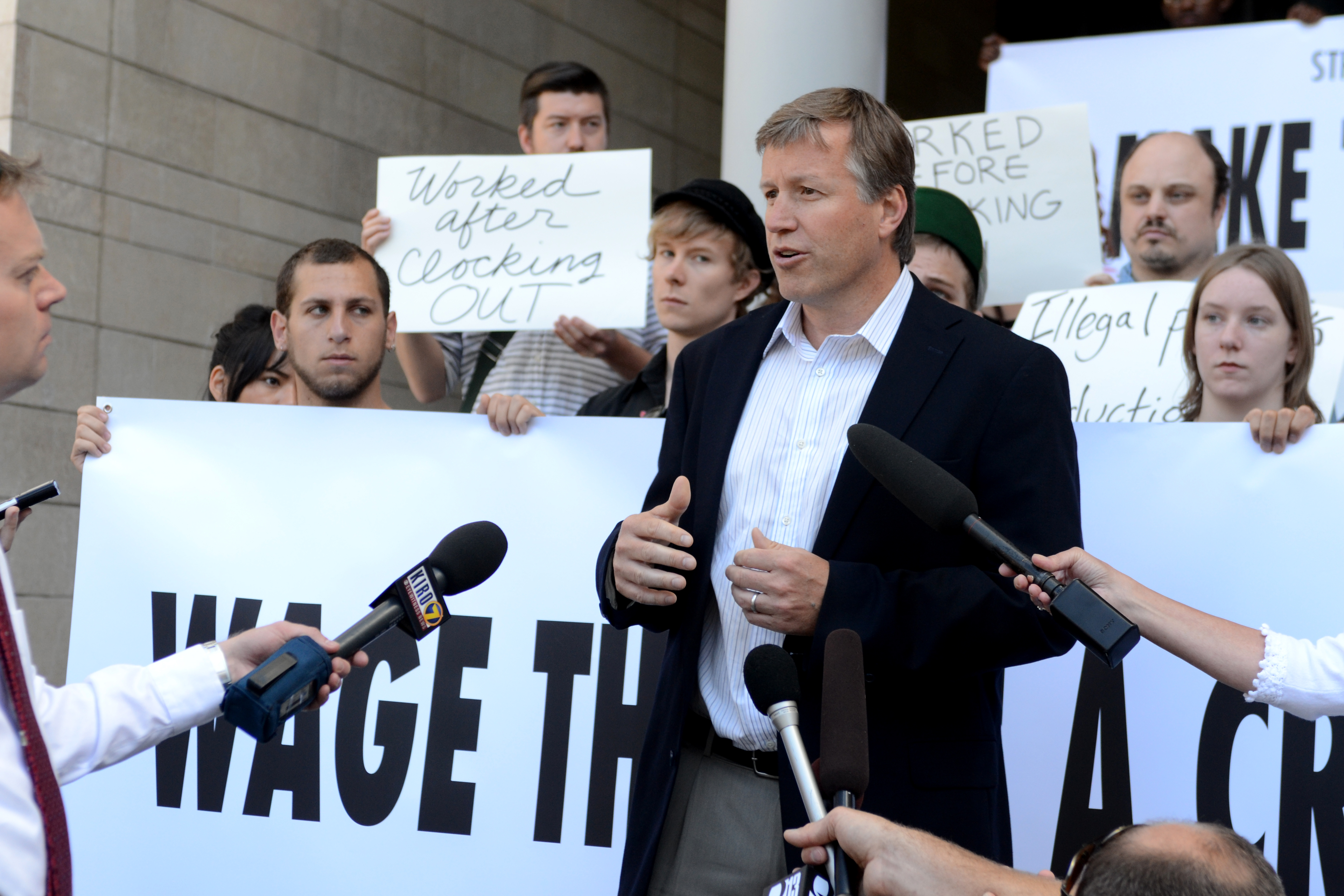
Service Employees International Union anti-wage theft protest (Seattle, 2013)

Wage theft is the failing to pay wages or provide employee benefits owed to an employee by contract or law. It can be conducted by employers in various ways, among them are failing to pay overtime; violating minimum-wage laws; the misclassification of employees as independent contractors; illegal deductions in pay; forcing employees to work "off the clock"; not paying annual leave or holiday entitlements; or simply not paying an employee at all.

== Wage theft by jurisdiction ==
=== Wage theft in the United States ===
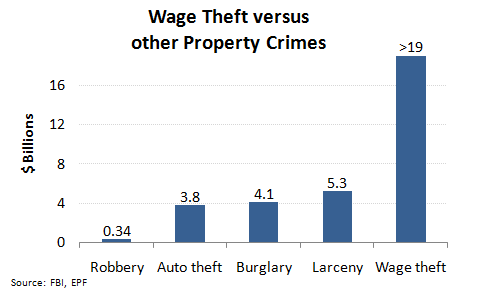
Annual value of different forms of theft in the U.S., expressed in billions of US dollars. Figures are from the FBI's Uniform Crime Reports for 2012.

According to some studies, wage theft is common in the United States, particularly against low wage workers, including citizens and undocumented immigrants. Some rights violated by wage theft have been guaranteed to workers in the United States in the 1938 Fair Labor Standards Act (FLSA).

In 2019, the U.S. Department of Labor cited about 8,500 employers for taking about $287 million from workers, but they rarely punish repeat offenders, which "perpetuates income inequality, hitting lowest-paid workers hardest." 2023 studies showed that a significant amount of wage theft goes unreported because employees may not fully understand what constitutes wage theft, or they fear reprisals, and so most of the theft, estimated at $50 billion per year, is not recovered.

==== Forms ====
===== Overtime =====
According to the FLSA, unless exempt, employees are entitled to receive overtime pay of at least "time-and-a-half", or one and one-half times normal pay, for all time worked past forty hours a week. Some exemptions to this rule apply to public service agencies or to employees who meet certain requirements in accordance to their job duties along with a salary of no less than $684 a week. A 2009 study of workers in the United States found that in 12 occupations more than half of surveyed workers reported being denied overtime pay: child care (90.2 percent denial), stock and office clerks (86 percent), home health care (82.7 percent), beauty/dry cleaning and general repair workers (81.9 percent), car wash workers and parking attendants (77.9 percent), waiters, cafeteria workers and bartenders (77.9 percent), retail salespersons (76.2 percent), janitors and grounds workers (71.2 percent), garment workers (69.9 percent), cooks and dishwashers (67.8 percent), construction workers (66.1 percent), and cashiers (58.8 percent).

===== Minimum wage =====
In 2009, reform placed the new United States federal minimum wage at $7.25. Some states have legislation that sets a state minimum wage. In the case an employee is subject to both federal and state minimum wage acts, the employee is entitled to the higher standard of compensation. For tipped employees, the employer is only required to compensate the employee $2.13 an hour as long as the fixed wage and the tips add up to be at or above the federal minimum wage. Minimum wage is enforced by the Wage and Hour Division (WHD). WHD is generally contacted by 25,000 people a year in regards to concerns and violations of minimum wage pay. A common form of wage theft for tipped employees is to receive no standard pay ($2.13 an hour) along with tips.

===== Misclassification =====
Misclassification of employees is a violation that leaves employees very vulnerable to other forms of wage theft. Under the FLSA, independent contractors do not receive the same protection as an employee for certain benefits. The difference between the two classifications depends on the permanency of the employment, opportunity for profit and loss, the worker's level of self-employment along with their degree of control. An independent contractor is not entitled to minimum wage, overtime, insurance, protection, or other employee rights. Attempts are sometimes made to define ordinary employees as independent contractors.

Misclassification in the United States is extensive. In New York state, for example, it was found in a 2007 study that 704,785 workers, or 10.3% of the state's private sector workforce, were misclassified each year. For the industries covered in the study, average unemployment insurance taxable wages underreported due to misclassification was on average $4.3 billion for the year and unemployment insurance tax underreported in these industries was $176 million.

===== Illegal deductions =====
Employees are subject to forms of wage theft through illegal deductions. Trivial or fabricated violations in the workplace are used to validate deductions. Any deduction that brings an employee to a level of compensation lower than minimum wage is also illegal. In many states, employers are required to issue employees documentation of deductions along with earnings. Failure to issue this documentation is generally prevalent in work places subject to wage theft.

===== Full wage theft =====
The most blatant form of wage theft is for an employee to not be paid for work done. An employee being asked to work overtime, working through breaks, or being asked to report early or leave late without pay is being subjected to wage theft. This is sometimes justified as displacing a paid meal break without guaranteeing meal break time. In the most extreme cases, employees report receiving nothing. In some cases, the legal status of the workers can enable employers to withhold pay without fear of facing any consequences.

===== Other forms =====
Putting pressure on injured workers to not file for workers' compensation is frequently successful. Employees are often confronted with threats of firing, or calls to immigration services if they complain or seek redress. Workers are often denied time off or annual vacation time that they have acquired, or denied pay for sick leave or earned vacation time.

==== Incidence ====
Workplace violation rates in the United States (2008)
Violation	Percent of all workers surveyed	Percent of workers at risk of violation
Minimum wage violation	25.9%	25.9%
Overtime violation	19.1%	76.3%
Off-the-clock violation	16.9%	70.1%
Meal break violation	58.3%	69.5%
Worker subjected to an illegal pay deduction	4.7%	40.5%
Tips stolen by employer or supervisor	1.6%	12.2%
• Violation occurred in week prior to worker being surveyed • Results based on survey of 4,387 low wage workers

A 2009 study based on interviews of over 4,000 low wage workers in Chicago, Los Angeles, and New York City found that wage theft from low wage workers in large American cities was severe and widespread. Incidents varied with the type of job and employee. Sixty-eight percent of the surveyed workers experienced at least one pay-related violation in the week prior to the survey. On average, the workers in the three cities lost a total of $2,634 annually due to workplace violations, out of an average income of $17,616, which translates into wage theft of fifteen percent of income. Extrapolating from these figures, low wage workers in Chicago, Los Angeles, and New York City lost more than $2.9 billion due to employment and labor law violations.

===== Workers at risk =====
Studies have found inflated rates of wage theft violations in markets employing women and foreign-born populations, and there are indications that wage exploitation and wage theft are among key motivations of employers for hiring migrant workers. Within the foreign-born population, women were at a much greater risk for wage violations than their male counterparts. Undocumented workers or unauthorized immigrants stood at the highest risk levels. Education, longer tenured employment, and English proficiency proved to be influential factors in employee populations. All three variables reduced the probability of wage theft for the aforementioned demographics. Workplaces where the compensation was paid in one weekly flat rate or in cash saw a higher instance rate of wage theft. Smaller businesses with less than 100 employees also saw a higher instance rate of violations than larger business. In one study, the manufacturing industry, repair services, and private home employment were at the highest risk for violations at the workplace. Home health care, education, and construction saw the lowest levels of wage theft. Restaurants, grocery stores, retail, and warehousing fell around the median.

===== Contemporary examples =====
In a report released on November 26, 2011, a Palm Beach County organization, People Engaged in Active Community Efforts (PEACE), sent postcards to Macy's and Bealls executives as a form of protest. The Florida Retail Federation had recently proposed a bill to block a wage theft ordinance in their county, which was intended to create a system that would speed the investigation and processing of wage theft reports.

A 2012 study by the Iowa Policy Project calculated that dishonest employers defraud Iowa workers out of about $600 million annually in wages. State Senator Tony Bisignano, Democrat from Des Moines, and Senator William Dotzler, a Democrat from Waterloo, Iowa, proposed a bill to strengthen wage law enforcement on January 28, 2015, "since Iowa's wage theft laws are so weak they are impossible to enforce". The Iowa Association of Business and Industry opposed the bill, saying that resources for enforcement should be the focus instead.

In 2021, Tyler Technologies paid $3 million to settle claims that it had required some employees to work overtime, and had not paid them for that time.

==== Enforcement ====
===== Documentation =====
In the United States, the Fair Labor Standards Act (FLSA) requires employers to keep detailed records regarding the identity of workers and hours worked for all workers who are protected under federal minimum wage laws. Most states require that employers also provide each worker with documentation every pay period detailing that worker's hours, wages, and deductions. As of September 2011 Arkansas, Florida, Louisiana, Mississippi, Nebraska, South Dakota, Tennessee, and Virginia did not require this documentation. A 2008 survey of wage theft from workers in Illinois, New York, and California found that 57% of low wage workers did not receive this required documentation and that workers who were paid in cash or on a weekly rate were more likely to experience wage theft. Anecdotal evidence suggests that tip theft, which is a legally complex issue distinct from wage theft and not necessarily under the control of the same laws governing the payment of wages, may also be common in instances where employer record keeping does not comply with the law.

===== Penalties and sanctions =====
When the Wage and Hour Division (WHD) receives reports of violations, it works to ensure that employers change their work practices and pay back missed wages to the employees. Willful violators can face fines up to $10,000 upon their first conviction with imprisonment resulting from future convictions. In regards to child labor laws, an employer can face a fine of up to $11,000 per minor. In 2012 the Wage and Hour Division collected $280 million in back wages for 308,000 workers. As of 2014, there are 1,100 federal investigators for 135 million workers in more than 7 million businesses. The ratio of labor enforcement agents to U.S. workers has decreased over tenfold since the inception of the FLSA, from one for every 11,000 workers in 1941 to one for every 123,000 workers in 2014.

In February 2010, Miami-Dade County, Florida became the first jurisdiction in America to ban wage theft with an ordinance passed unanimously by the county commission. Prior to the ordinance, wage theft was called "the crime wave that almost no one talks about".

Labor organizations have supported local wage‑theft enforcement measures. For example, the Affiliated Construction Trades of Ohio (ACT Ohio) has backed ordinances in cities such as Columbus, Cleveland, and Cincinnati that require contractors to self‑report wage‑theft violations and bar repeat offenders from future city contracts.

=== Australia ===
A 2020 report by Unions NSW found that more than 3,000 foreign-language job ads offered illegally lower wages. A 2022 report by the same union found that over 7,000 job advertisements written in foreign languages offered illegally low wages.

In Australia, another form of wage theft is the failure of employers to pay the mandatory minimum contribution to employee's superannuation fund. Between 2009 and 2013 the Australian Taxation Office recovered A$1.3 billion in unpaid superannuation which is estimated to be only a small portion of total unpaid superannuation.

During 2019 and 2020 members at the University of Melbourne formed a casuals' network to deal with issues of wage theft. This culminated in the university issuing an apology and repaying $45 million in wages to current and former staff.

=== Canada ===
In 2012 in Windsor, Ontario nearly 200 people gathered at a grassroots meeting to discuss daily workplace challenges that workers face, including wage theft, which a labor union president described as "a sad state of affairs when you have a corporation that can dictate items".

=== United Arab Emirates ===
In the UAE, many employers have taken money out of their workers' wages. In some cases, workers have not been paid or workers are duped.

=== United Kingdom ===
A 2017 report by Middlesex University and Trust for London revealed that at least 2 million workers in Britain are losing an estimated £3 billion in unpaid holiday pay and wages per year. It suggested that withholding holiday pay, not paying wages and workers losing a couple of hours money per week are some of the deliberate strategies used by employers to improve their profits.

== See also ==
- At-will employment – United States legal concept concerning employment of individuals
