= Service company =

A service company is a company which is a service provider.

Service company may also refer to:

- Energy service company, a company which provides energy solutions
- Managed service company, a form of company structure in the United Kingdom
- Personal services company, a term used by the UK government to refer to "someone who works through their own limited company" under IR35 legislation.
