= Projects.co.id =

Indonesian freelance and digital goods marketplace

- Company type: Crowdsourcing
- Website type: Freelance marketplace, E-commerce
- Available in: Indonesian
- Founded: 2014
- Headquarters: Bandung, Indonesia
- Key people: Priyatna (Founder, CEO, CTO) dan Wiro Hardy (Co-Founder, CMO)
- Industry: Freelance marketplace, Online outsourcing, Employment website
- Website: Projects.co.id
- Registration: Required
- Launched: 2014
- Current status: Active

Projects.co.id is an Indonesian freelance and digital goods marketplace which allows project owners and employers to meet potential freelancers. Founded in 2014, Projects.co.id provides a platform for job hunter and digital product seller in the e-commerce platform in a variety of categories.

== History ==
The Website is operated under PT Panonpoe Media, early development began in 2013 with Priyatna as its founder and Wiro Hardy joined in 2014 as the co-founder. Projects.co.id is a self-funded website project and officially launched on 10 November 2014.

It has over 10,000 registered users as of May 2015. The website launched new features in 2015, namely Services feature to offer freelance service in a fixed price, Hire Me feature to directly hire worker without bid auction process and Ask Owner that allow worker to make a straight contact with their potential employer.

== Features ==
Projects.co.id uses the terms Project Owner to call user who want to post a job or a project, accept the bid and its worker. The freelancer, is called as Worker, can select the project, raise a bid and promote themselves. In the Products and Services features, Seller can offers their digital goods to the Buyer. Projects.co.id claimed as the first marketplace that combines a freelance marketplace with digital products e-commerce. Any digital product in form of files may be sold, such as electronic book, graphic design, software, game and website templates. The website also provides a link affiliate program that allows their user receives commission for every project transaction of registered user.

== Transaction ==
Transactions are processed through an escrow system and the payment are done through bank transfer or credit card payment. The fee is processed when the project deals are met and the job is completed. The website has right to 12% of every single deal.
