= Portage Entrepreneurial =

Portage entrepreneurial, also known as entrepreneurial hosting, or wage portage is a legal status, that allows any self-employed worker to create and operate their professional activity while delegating administrative tasks to a portage company that manages their business and income.

== Historical Background in France ==
The term "portage entrepreneurial" was coined in 2014 by Josette Londé, the president of the National Union of Specialized Portage Companies. After gaining recognition for freelance administration, in 2014, she created a new status "portage entrepreneurial", to enable anyone to set up their own independent business with complete management security and simplicity. The concept already existed before, based on the model of “portage salarial”, and was created following the restriction on the use of “portage salarial” by the Order of April 2015.

== Characteristics ==
Both "portage entrepreneurial" and "portage salarial" are concepts related to employment, but they have distinct differences. "Portage entrepreneurial", closer to entrepreneurship and independence than the "portage salarial" (status governed by the Labour Code), in order to democratize access to entrepreneurship for service provision activities.

Entrepreneurial portage simplifies the process of engaging in an independent activity, allowing service providers to serve both professional and private clients without the administrative and financial burdens typically associated with self-employment. By eliminating mandatory lump-sum financial investments, this approach streamlines entrepreneurial activities, allowing professionals to focus on service delivery and business growth.

In entrepreneurial portage, individuals operate independently without a hierarchical relationship, hence they don't contribute to "Pôle Emploi" or receive unemployment benefits. However, even with equivalent revenues, the "independent-porté" receives better net remuneration while still benefiting from general social coverage via their pay slip.

The players of the "portage entrepreneurial" system are a customer, a freelancer, an umbrella company. In portage entrepreneurial, the self-employed individual becomes a client of the portage company, which is empowered to handle the administrative management of their activity. There is no longer an employment contract in the traditional sense but rather tariffed bilateral contracts between the self-employed individual and the portage company. The self-employed person is free to organize himself as he wishes and freely manages his working time without the limit of hours imposed by the Labor Code. He has no obligation to report to the entrepreneurial umbrella company. Also, according to entrepreneurial portage, the self-employed can have all types of customers: companies, associations, individuals., and offer services to the same client repeatedly and for as long as the mission demands.

The portage company receives the self-employed individual's revenue, deducts taxes, charges, and its fees, and then transfers the remaining amount to the entrepreneur's personal account. The entrepreneur is also covered by the general social security system. There's no minimum revenue obligation, as the portage company isn't required to pay a minimum salary.

Entrepreneurial portage operates without specific legal obligations, with penalties tied to contractual performance; conflicts arising from the mission contract are addressed by the Commercial Court, while disputes between the "independent-porté" and the entrepreneurial portage company are handled by the Court of First Instance due to the mandate contract.
