= Lior Pozin =

Israeli entrepreneur (born c. 1995)

- ליאור פוזין
- Born: 1995 (age 30–31); Beersheba, Israel
- Occupations: Co-founder and CEO of AutoDS

Lior Pozin (Hebrew: ליאור פוזין; born 1995) is an Israeli businessman. He is the CEO of AutoDS, a dropshipping software company acquired by Fiverr in 2024.

== Early life ==
Pozin grew up in Beersheba, Israel. From age 14, Pozin began reselling items on eBay and dropshipping.

== Career ==
Pozin co-founded AutoDS with Michael Royf in 2016. The company was bootstrapped. In 2023, AutoDS acquired its largest competitor, DSMTool. By mid-2023, the platform had more than 20,000 active sellers, and roughly 100 employees in 13 countries.

In July 2024, Fiverr announced it would acquire AutoDS for up to $92 million.
