= Gumball Rally (disambiguation) =

Gumball Rally can refer to:

- The Gumball Rally, a film about a fictional coast to coast rally in the US
- Gumball 3000 - 3000 mile public road rally usually in Europe
- Modball, a rally similar to the Gumball 3000, but for elite modified cars
