= Fiverr =

Israeli online marketplace for freelance services

Fiverr International Ltd.
- Website type: Marketplace
- Available in: English, Spanish, French, Dutch, Portuguese, Italian, German
- Traded as: NYSE: FVRR
- Headquarters: Tel Aviv, Israel
- Area served: Worldwide
- Founders: Micha Kaufman; Shai Wininger
- Industry: Online marketplace; Freelance Marketplace; Online outsourcing
- Revenue: ▲US$431 million (2025)
- Net income: ▲US$21.0 million (2025)
- Employees: 787 (2021)
- Website: fiverr.com/index
- Commercial: Yes
- Registration: Required
- Launched: 1 February 2010; 16 years ago
- Current status: Active

Fiverr is an Israeli multinational online marketplace for freelance services. It connects freelancers to people or businesses looking for services. Fiverr takes its name from the $5 asking price attached to all tasks when the company was founded, though many sellers now charge more.

Listings on Fiverr are described as diverse, ranging from "get a well-designed business card" to "help with HTML, JavaScript, CSS, and jQuery". The highest-paying jobs on Fiverr include website design, social media manager, proofreading, copywriting, and resume writing. Freelancers work from a variety of workplaces. The platform is global, with freelancers and businesses spanning an estimated 160 countries. Fiverr listed on the NYSE in 2019.

== History ==
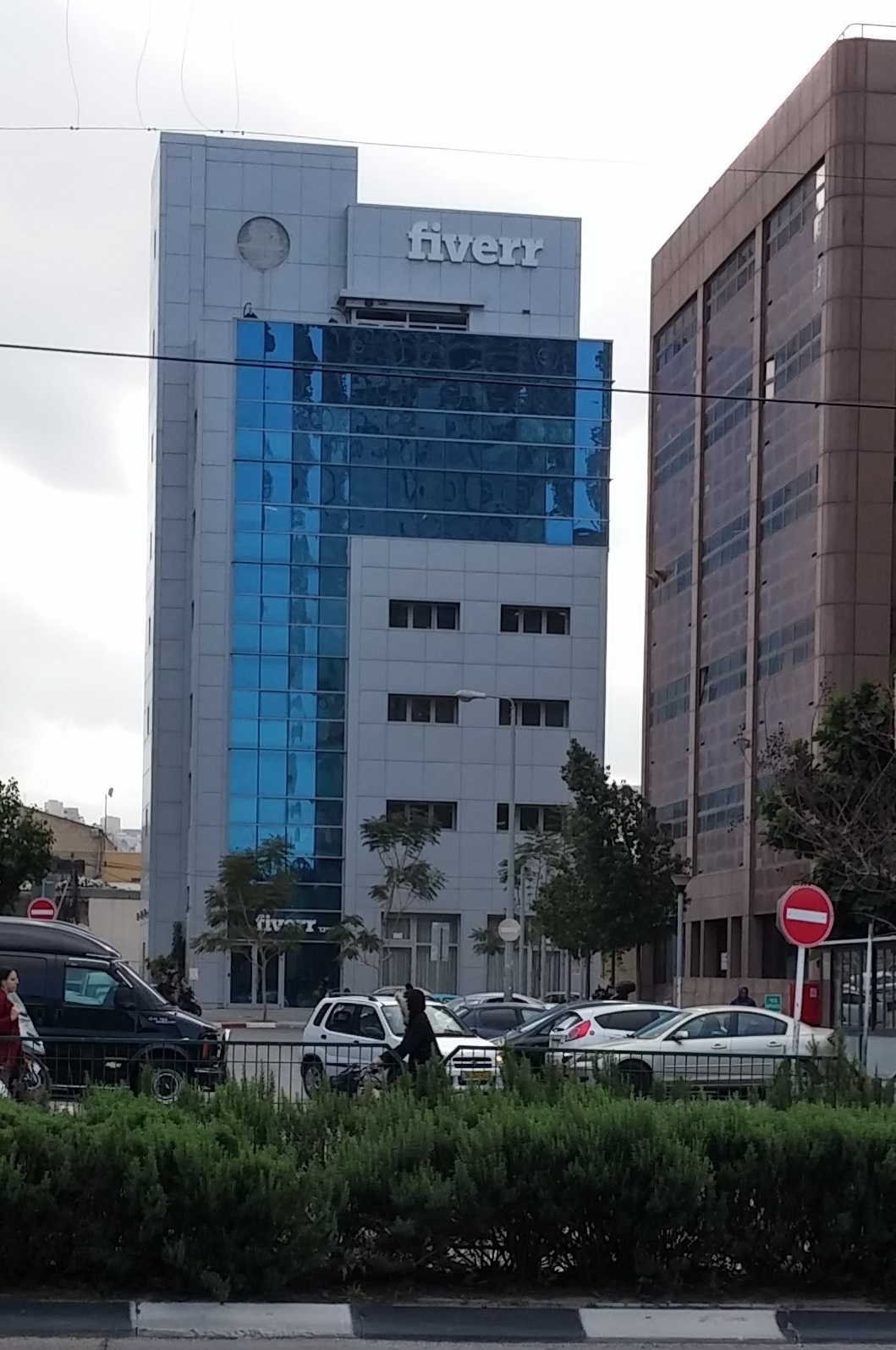
Fiverr's former headquarters in Tel Aviv in 2016

Fiverr was founded by Micha Kaufman and Shai Wininger. The founders came up with the concept of a marketplace that would provide a two-sided market for people to buy and sell a variety of digital services typically offered by freelance contractors. Services offered on the site include writing, translation, graphic design, video editing and programming. Fiverr's services start at US$5, and can go up to thousands of dollars.

In December 2013, Fiverr released their iOS app in the Apple App Store, and in March 2014 the company published their Android app in the Google Play Store.

In October 2015, Amazon started legal action against 1,114 Fiverr sellers it claims provide fake reviews on the US version of its website. Fiverr did not dispute Amazon's allegations and stated: "As Amazon noted, we have worked closely together to remove services that violate our terms of use, and respond promptly to any reports of inappropriate content." Amazon filed suit after an undercover sting.

In November 2015, Fiverr announced that it had raised US$60 million in a Series D round of funding, led by Square Peg Capital. The round brought their total funding to date to $110 million.

On 18 February 2021, the company reported $189.5 million in revenue for the 2020 fiscal year, a 77% increase from the previous fiscal year ($107.1 million).

On 18 February 2025, Fiverr announced a series of AI features under the brand name "Fiverr Go".

== Products ==
Launched in 2020, Fiverr Business helps teams at larger companies manage their workflows with freelancers and remote workers.

Also in 2020, Fiverr launched Logo Maker, a tool powered by artificial intelligence for designing company logos.

== Acquisitions ==
In 2017, Fiverr acquired the video creation marketplace VeedMe.

In January 2018, AND.CO, maker of software for freelancers, was acquired by Fiverr. Afterwards, CEO Micha Kaufman said that at the time, many of AND CO's capabilities, such as invoicing, are "baked into" the Fiverr marketplace, but "the vast majority of freelancing is happening offline"—and Fiverr wants to enable those offline relationships. AND.CO was converted into Fiverr Workspace in 2021.

In February 2019, Fiverr acquired the premium subscription-based content marketing platform, ClearVoice which was founded in 2014.

In August 2020, Fiverr acquired SLT Consulting, a boutique digital marketing agency specializing in social media marketing, search engine optimization (SEO), as well as brand and content marketing. The agency was founded by Sharon Lee Thony, who built its business using Fiverr.

In February 2021, Fiverr acquired the creative talent marketplace Working Not Working.

In October 2021, Fiverr acquired the education and training platform CreativeLive.

In November 2021, Fiverr acquired the freelance management platform Stoke Talent for $95 million.

In July 2024, Fiverr announced its acquisition of AutoDS, a dropshipping automation platform and company employing more than 200 people and founded by Lior Pozin. In May 2025, AutoDS announced it had been named as Shopify's top affiliate partner.

In November 2025, Fiverr acquired the Ukrainian IT holding Digis Group, which included Digis and Scalamandra. Following the acquisition, Digis founder Mykyta Nahatkin remained with the combined structure, while the Digis team of about 200 employees grew by 20 percent after the deal.

== Initiatives for nonprofits ==
In December 2024, Fiverr introduced its inaugural Nonprofit Hub to support the increasing number of nonprofit organizations. This platform offers registered nonprofits $50 in Fiverr credits to begin, with an additional $50 credit for every $500 spent. It also provides discounts on tools like Adobe and WordPress.

The Nonprofit hub connects nonprofits with vetted freelancers experienced in the sector and supplies educational materials, including guides on 501(c)(3) incorporation and fundraising strategies. A survey by Fiverr revealed that over half of nonprofit leaders report regular employee burnout, and 81% noted that freelancers positively impact their organizations’s adaptability to new demands.

A survey commissioned by Fiverr highlighted the challenges faced by nonprofits, revealing that over 50% of nonprofit leaders reported regular employee burnout. Furthermore, 81% of respondents noted that working with freelancers improved their organization’s adaptability to evolving demands and operational challenges.

== Criticism ==
In 2017, Fiverr was criticized for advertisements portraying unhealthy living and excesses in work behaviors as ideals to live up to. The company has also been criticized for undervaluing freelance labor and pushing down prices.

== See also ==
- E-lancing
- Freelancer.com
- Gig worker
- Upwork – American freelance marketplace
