= Freelancing in India =

India had an estimated 15 million independent workers or freelancers in 2020, with industries like Information Technology, finance, Human Resource and design increasingly hiring people on a project basis. 70 percent of freelancers from India reported working exclusively as freelancers, with 48 percent of them dedicating 30 hours or less per week to their work. In a report of (National Institution for Transforming India) NITI Aayog has estimated that India’s gig workforce or freelancing will grow to 2.35 crore by 2029-30. In 2020-21, it was at 77 lakh. Of this 26.6 lakh gig workers were from sales and retail trade.

India’s workforce is increasingly drawn to freelance and contractual work. With one of the world’s largest working-age populations, India is considered to have the potential to become a leading hub of the global gig economy.

== Government ==
There was little effort from India's government towards assisting freelancers until in 2015 when it started the Digital India Platform (DIP), an initiative to digitize all government documents and where freelancers are hired to perform the tasks. Anyone with computer knowledge, Internet access, and a valid Aadhar card would be eligible to apply for this freelance opportunity. More than 68% of freelancers depend upon social media to find suitable work opportunities

Considering that the PM Modi’s Government has encouraged entrepreneurship by launching multiple programs, such as Skill India and Startup India, it should now lend a helping hand and support the freelancer's community.

== Female Indian freelance workers ==
Numerous highly educated women, holding masters and doctorate degrees in India who cannot pursue a regular occupation due to family and social obligations. Rather than cutting short their professional careers, these women often turn to freelancing.

Although freelancing offers a flexible career option, the number of Indian women in freelancing remains comparatively smaller than their male counterparts. In a survey conducted by Payoneer, a payments services provider based in New York in 2015, only 22 percent of Indian freelancers are women. Not only this but the same report reveals that women are paid lesser than the men who freelance. While a male freelancer earns $19 per hour on an average, a female freelancer apparently earns $17 per hour for the same project.

== Companies and freelancers ==
The distinct shifts in technology, culture, demographics, and professional needs and goals have driven companies to reassess their human resource policies to accommodate the burgeoning freelance economy. India has seen a significant increase in the freelance community, with a 46% rise in new freelancers from Q1 to Q2 in 2020, as reported by Times of India in 2022. These companies hire freelancers and independent consultants across various levels of management, including positions such as freelance CFOs who contribute to streamlining a company’s finances. According to industry estimates, hiring the services of an outsourced CFO can result in operational savings of 30 to 70 percent. Depending upon the nature of the job, fees can range from Rs. 30,000 to a few lakhs per month.
