= Managed service company =

Company structure in the United Kingdom

A managed service company (MSC) is a form of company structure in the United Kingdom designed to reduce the individual tax liabilities of the directors and shareholders.

== Structure ==
This structure is largely born from the IR35 legislation of 1999, which came into force in 2000. In an MSC, workers are appointed as shareholders and may also be directors. As shareholders, they can then receive minimum salary payments and the balance of income as dividends. Usually, the service provider would perform administrative and company secretary duties and offer basic taxation advice.

This structure became popular with independent contractors and was used as a way of earning high net returns (up to 85% of gross) compared to PAYE, with little corporate responsibilities. In return, the providers charged a fee for delivering the service. To work within this form, workers must usually pass IR35 tests to ensure they can make dividend payments.

== History ==
In December 2006 the UK Treasury/HMRC introduced draft legislation "Tackling Managed Service Legislation" which sought to address the use of "composite" structures to avoid Income Tax and National Insurance on forms of trading that the Treasury deemed as being akin to "employed". After a period of consultation and re-draft, the new legislation became law in April 2007 with additional aspects coming into force in August 2007 and fully in January 2008. A PAYE umbrella company is effectively exempted from the legislation, which also seeks to pass the possible burden of unpaid debt (should a provider "collapse" a structure) to interested parties e.g. A recruitment agency that has been deemed to encourage or facilitate the scheme.

Several MSC providers have since withdrawn from the market and have either converted to PAYE operations or sought to become seen as true accountants rather than scheme promoters.

Managed service companies (MSC) differ from personal service companies (PSC) as the MSC manages and controls the affairs of the business, not the contractor.

The 2007 Budget legislated against Managed Service Companies (MSCs) by removing the associated tax advantages for contractors working through them. Prior to this government action, there were several types of MSCs.

One of the most common forms was the composite company, where typically up to 20 contractors became non-director shareholders. These contractors received a low salary and expenses, with the remainder paid as dividends. This method of remuneration offered significant financial benefits, as it avoided the payment of national insurance contributions and income tax that would otherwise have been due if the contractor was paid entirely under PAYE (salary).

HMRC became increasingly frustrated with the use of MSCs. When investigated, these companies could quickly liquidate (as they held no assets) and begin trading under a new company name the very next day. Following the MSC legislation, it is now the responsibility of an MSC provider to correctly operate PAYE and deduct the necessary tax and national insurance contributions on all income paid to a subcontractor.

To strengthen this law, the government has allowed the recovery of any underpaid taxes from relevant third parties—primarily those behind the MSC as well as connected or controlling parties

Some companies still offer variations on these schemes, so it can be confusing to a contractor to know what is legal and what is not. The simplest way to operate compliantly is to work for one's own PSC, and not delegate control or key decisions to a third party supplier.
