= American system of manufacturing =

Method of production involving extensive mechanization and interchangeable parts

The American system of manufacturing was a set of manufacturing methods that evolved in the 19th century. The two notable features were the extensive use of interchangeable parts and mechanization for production, which resulted in more efficient use of labor compared to hand methods. The system was also known as armory practice because it was first fully developed in armories, namely, the United States Armories at Springfield in Massachusetts and Harpers Ferry in Virginia (later West Virginia), inside contractors to supply the United States Armed Forces, and various private armories. The name "American system" came not from any aspect of the system that is unique to the American national character, but simply from the fact that for a time in the 19th century it was strongly associated with the American companies who first successfully implemented it, and how their methods contrasted (at that time) with those of British and continental European companies. In the 1850s, the "American system" was contrasted to the British factory system which had evolved over the previous century. Within a few decades, manufacturing technology had evolved further, and the ideas behind the "American" system were in use worldwide. Therefore, in manufacturing today, which is global in the scope of its methods, there is no longer any such distinction.

The American system involved semi-skilled labor using machine tools and jigs to make standardized, identical, interchangeable parts, manufactured to a tolerance, which could be assembled with a minimum of time and skill, requiring little to no fitting.

Since the parts are interchangeable, it was also possible to separate manufacture from assembly and repair—an example of the division of labor. This meant that all three functions could be carried out by semi-skilled labor: manufacture in smaller factories up the supply chain, assembly on an assembly line in a main factory, and repair in small specialized shops or in the field. The result is that more things could be made, more cheaply, and with higher quality, and those things also could be distributed further, and lasted longer, because repairs were also easier and cheaper. In the case of each function, the system of interchangeable parts typically involved substituting specialized machinery to replace hand tools.

Interchangeability of parts was finally achieved by combining a number of innovations and improvements in machining operations and machine tools, which were developed primarily for making textile machinery. These innovations included the invention of new machine tools and jigs (in both cases, for guiding the cutting tool), fixtures for holding the work in the proper position, and blocks and gauges to check the accuracy of the finished parts.

== Use of machinery ==
English machine tool manufacturer Joseph Whitworth was appointed as a British commissioner for the New York International Exhibition. Accompanied by another British commissioner, he traveled around several states visiting various manufacturers, and as a result published a highly influential report on American manufacturing, from which he is quoted:

The laboring classes are comparatively few in number, but this is counterbalanced by, and indeed, may be one of the causes of the eagerness by which they call in the use of machinery in almost every department of industry. Wherever it can be applied as a substitute for manual labor, it is universally and willingly resorted to ... It is this condition of the labor market, and this eager resort to machinery wherever it can be applied, to which, under the guidance of superior education and intelligence, the remarkable prosperity of the United States is due.

— Joseph Whitworth, 1854

== Other characteristics ==
The American system contributed to efficiency gains through division of labor. Division of labor helped manufacturing transition from small artisan's shops to early factories. Key pieces of evidence supporting efficiency gains include increase in firm size, evidence of returns to scale, and an increase in non-specialized labor. The need for firms to train uneducated people to perform only one thing in the productivity chain allowed for the use of non-specialized labor. Women and children were employed more frequently within larger firms, especially those producing furniture and clothing..

== History ==
In the late 18th century, French General Jean Baptiste Vaquette de Gribeauval suggested that muskets could be manufactured faster and more economically if they were made from interchangeable parts. This system would also make field repairs easier to carry out under battle conditions. He provided patronage to Honoré Blanc, who attempted to implement the Système Gribeauval, but never succeeded. Until then, under the British factory system, skilled machinists were required to produce parts from a design. But however skilled the machinist, parts were never identical, and each part had to be manufactured separately to fit its counterpart—almost always by one person who produced each completed item from start to finish.

Mass production using interchangeable parts was first achieved in 1803 by Marc Isambard Brunel in cooperation with Henry Maudslay, and Simon Goodrich, under the management of (with contributions by) Brigadier-General Sir Samuel Bentham, the Inspector General of Naval Works at Portsmouth Block Mills at Portsmouth Dockyard, for the British Royal Navy during the Napoleonic War. By 1808 annual production had reached 130,000 sailing blocks. This method of working did not catch on in general manufacturing in Britain for many decades, and when it did it was imported from America, becoming known as the American System of Manufacturing, even though it originated in England.

The Lowell system is also related to the American system during this time. It emphasized procuring, training, and providing housing and other living necessities for the workforce, as well as using semi-automated machines in a centralized factory building or complex.

Gribeauval's idea was conveyed to the US by two routes. First, Blanc's friend Thomas Jefferson championed it, sending copies of Blanc's memoirs and papers describing his work to Secretary of War Henry Knox. Second, artillery officer Louis de Tousard (who had served with Lafayette) was an enthusiast of Gribeauval's ideas. Tousard wrote two influential documents after the American Revolution; one was used as the blueprint for West Point, and the other became the officer's training manual.

The War Department, which included officers trained at West Point on Tousard's manual, established the armories at Springfield and Harper's Ferry and tasked them with solving the problem of interchangeability. The task was finally accomplished in the 1820s. Historian David A. Hounshell believes that this was done by Captain John H. Hall, an inside contractor at Harper's Ferry. In a letter dated 1822 Hall makes the claim he had achieved interchangeability in that year. But historian Diana Muir argues that it is more probable that it was Simeon North, a Connecticut arms contractor manufacturing guns for the US Army. North, not Hall, was the inventor of the crucial milling machine in 1816, and had an advantage over Hall in that he worked closely with the first industry that mass-produced complex machines from mass-produced interchangeable parts, the Connecticut clock-making industry. By 1815 the idea of interchangeability was well established in the US government system of procurement; Congressional contracts stipulated this quality in muskets, rifles and pistols ordered after that date. Interchangeability of firearms parts at the U.S. armories was found to have been in use for a number of years by the time of the 1853 British Parliamentary Commissions Committee on Small Arms inquiry.

The "American method" was reintroduced to the UK in the 1850s, when Colt executed on order on naval revolvers in Pimlico, and strikes of London and Birmingham gunmakers during the war made the War Office realize the usefulness of being able to employ low-skilled workers, so milling machines were bought and installed at the Royal Small Arms Factory by 1857.

A critical factor in making interchangeable metal parts was the invention of several machine tools, such as the slide rest lathe, screw cutting lathe, turret lathe, milling machine and metal planer. One of the most important and versatile of these machine tools was David Wilkinson's lathe, for which he received a $10,000 award from the government of the United States.

Eli Whitney is generally credited with the idea and the practical application, but both are incorrect attributions. Based on his reputation as the inventor of the cotton gin, the US government gave him a contract in 1798 for 10,000 muskets to be produced within two years. It actually took eight years to deliver the order, as Whitney perfected and developed new techniques and machines. In a letter to Treasury Secretary Oliver Wolcott apologizing for the delays, Whitney wrote:

One of my primary objectives it to form tools so the tools themselves shall fashion the work and give to every part its just proportion – which when once accomplished, will give expedition, uniformity, and exactness to the whole... In short, the tools which I contemplate are similar to engraving on a copper plate from which may be taken a great number of impressions, perfectly alike.

Whitney did use machinery; however, there is no evidence that he produced any new type of metalworking machinery. After completing the initial contract, Whitney went on to produce another 15,000 muskets within the following two years. Whitney never actually expressed any interest in interchangeability until 1800, when Treasury Secretary Wolcott exposed him to the memoirs of Blanc, but he spent far more time and energy promoting the idea than developing it.

In order to spread knowledge of manufacturing techniques, the War Department made contractors open their shops to other manufacturers and competitors. The armories also openly shared manufacturing techniques with private industry. Additionally, the idea migrated from the armories to industry as machinists trained in the armory system were hired by other manufacturers. Skilled engineers and machinists thus influenced American clockmakers and sewing machine manufacturers Wilcox and Gibbs and Wheeler and Wilson, who used interchangeable parts before 1860. Late to adopt the interchangeable system were Singer Corporation sewing machine (1870s), reaper manufacturer McCormick Harvesting Machine Company (1870s–80s) and several large steam engine manufacturers such as Corliss (mid-1880s) as well as locomotive makers. Large scale of production of bicycles in the 1880s used the interchangeable system.

The idea would also help lead to the American "Golden Age" of manufacturing when Ransom E. Olds mass-produced the Curved Dash automobile starting in 1901. Henry Ford did not start mass producing cars until 1913. Mastering true interchangeability on the assembly line, the Ford plant produced standard model cars. These efficient production strategies allowed these automobiles to be affordable for the middle class.

=== Pre–Industrial Revolution ===
The idea of interchangeable parts and the separate assembly line was not new, though it was little used. The idea was first developed in East Asia during the Warring States period and later the Qin dynasty over 2200 years ago – bronze crossbow triggers and locking mechanisms were mass-produced and made to be interchangeable. Venice during the late Middle Ages had ships that were produced using pre-manufactured parts, assembly lines, and mass production. The Venetian Arsenal apparently produced nearly one ship every day, in what was effectively the world's first factory.

== See also ==
- American System of Watch Manufacturing
- Eli Whitney
- Industrial Revolution
- Inside contracting
- Manufacturing
