= AutoDS =

Business-to-business software company

- Type: Subsidiary
- Industry: E-commerce, Software as a service
- Founded: 2016; 10 years ago (Note: Sources differ on the founding year. Fiverr's 2024 acquisition announcement and contemporaneous press reports give 2018; the company and a 2025 Entrepreneur profile give 2016.) in Be'er-Sheva, Israel
- Founders: Lior Pozin; Michael Royf; Ofir Bokobza
- Headquarters: Tel Aviv, Israel and Denver, Colorado, US
- Area served: Worldwide
- Key people: Lior Pozin (CEO)
- Products: Dropshipping automation software
- Brands: AutoDS, BuildYourStore, CreateUGC, ShopShark, DSMtool, ViralVault, SaleFreaks
- Number of employees: c.200
- Parent: Fiverr (2024–present)
- Website: autods.com

Modball start line in Thessaloniki, Greece, 2026. AutoDS is the multi-year title sponsor of the international driving tour.

AutoDS is a software company that develops a subscription-based platform for automating dropshipping businesses. The software handles product sourcing, listing, inventory and price monitoring, and order fulfilment for sellers on marketplaces and storefront platforms including eBay, Shopify and Amazon. AutoDS was founded by Lior Pozin in 2016, and was acquired by Fiverr in July 2024. The company continues to operate as an independent business unit.

== History ==
AutoDS was founded by Lior Pozin, Michael Royf and Ofir Bokobza. Pozin, who had sold goods on eBay as a teenager, wrote the original software to manage multiple eBay stores of his own. Only through meeting other dropshippers at events, he understood there was a demand for what he had built, and he began offering it to other sellers.

The business was bootstrapped, scaling organically without raising outside investment. Pozin said in 2023 "When customers came in, we saw that we were able to roll over from their cash flow, so why should we bring in an external investor?"

The company's growth accelerated significantly during the coronavirus pandemic.

AutoDS launched a Shopify app in 2020.

In 2023 the company acquired two smaller dropshipping tools, DSMTool and ViralVault, and began introducing AI features to the dropshipping platform.

In 2025 AutoDS announced that it was Shopify's top affiliate partner.

=== Acquisition by Fiverr ===
On 31 July 2024, Fiverr announced that it had acquired AutoDS, describing it as an end-to-end solution for dropshippers that aggregated more than 150 million products and served tens of thousands of paying subscribers. At the time of the deal, AutoDS employed several hundred people globally. According to Fiverr's annual report, the total consideration had a fair value of US$55.7 million, including US$39.3 million in cash, with an earn-out of up to US$36 million payable over three years subject to financial targets. Entrepreneur later reported the sale price as US$92 million.

According to Channel 12, Pozin was taking an Uber in New York City when the papers came through, and he stopped at the nearest Starbucks where he signed the deal.

Liz Morton, founder and editor of Value Added Resource, commented that the acquisition was potentially ill-timed. She cited moves by major marketplaces to restrict retail-arbitrage dropshipping.

AutoDS has continued to operate independently within Fiverr under Pozin as CEO. In August 2024 the company appointed Shomron Koush as vice-president of operations, following its acquisition of Viral Vault and a partnership with AliExpress.

=== Later acquisitions ===
In March 2025, AutoDS announced the acquisition of Salefreaks.com, a tool for selling products from Amazon on eBay. In January 2026, Fiverr acquired Yaballe, another dropshipping automation platform focused on eBay sellers; Yaballe remained separately operated but was positioned alongside AutoDS.

== Software ==
AutoDS's core product is a web-based platform that connects a seller's storefronts to supplier catalogues. Features include importing product listings from suppliers, monitoring supplier prices and stock levels and updating listings automatically, and placing orders with suppliers when a customer buys. The platform supports multiple selling channels from a single dashboard. Revenue comes from monthly subscriptions and per-order credits for automated fulfilment.

== Other brands ==
- BuildYourStore.ai – an AI-driven ecommerce website builder tool that generates a pre-populated Shopify store, launched by the AutoDS team. It is offered free and relies on AutoDS for product sourcing and fulfilment; reviewers have noted that users still require paid Shopify and AutoDS subscriptions to operate the resulting store.
- CreateUGC.ai – an AI video generator for user-generated content-style advertisements, launched in September 2025.
- ShopShark – a TikTok ecommerce market research product by AutoDS.
