= Josette Londé =

Entrepreneur

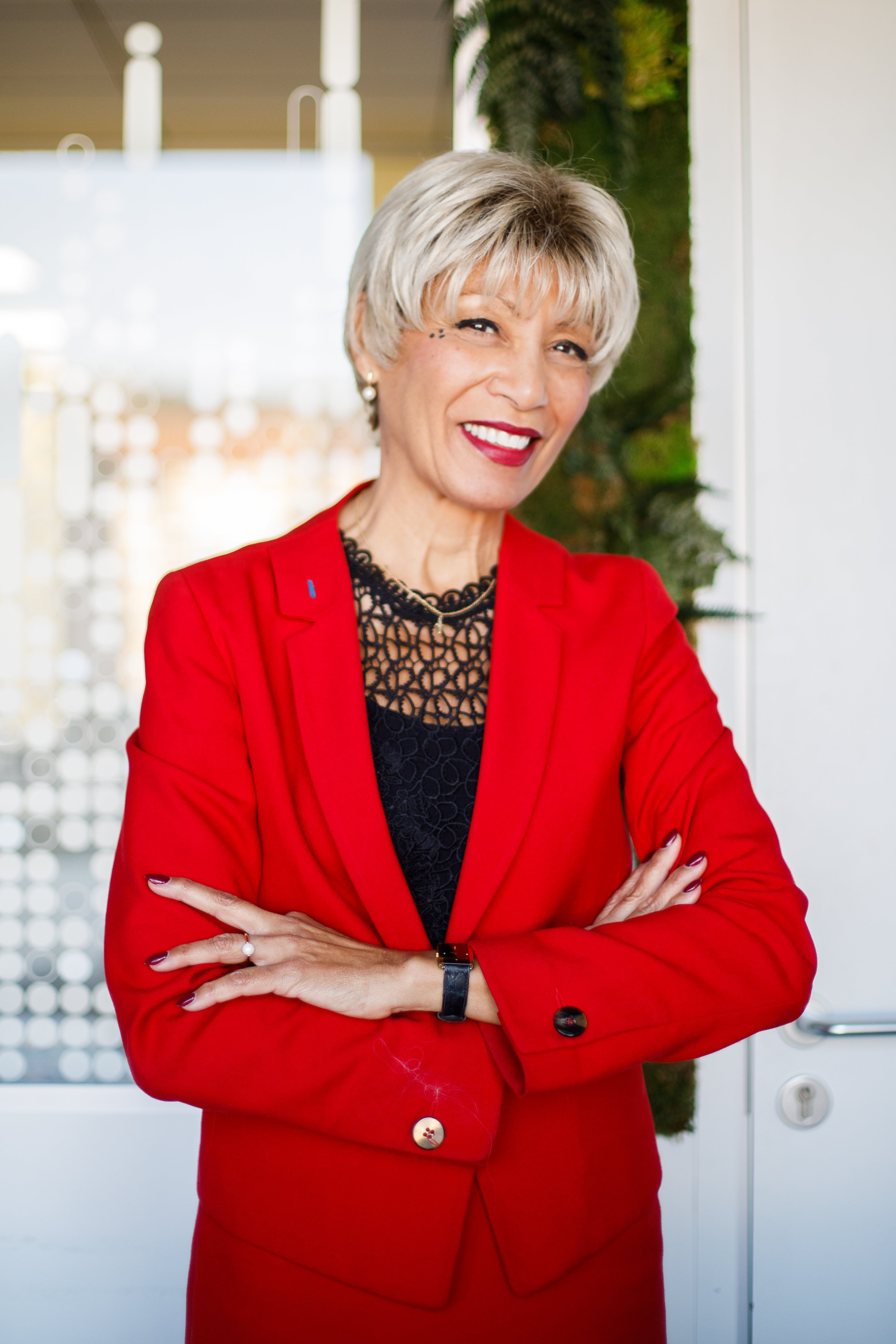
- Born: June 15, 1953 (age 71); Dakar, Senegal
- Known for: director of JL Portage

Josette Londé (born June 15, 1953, in Dakar, Senegal) is an entrepreneur, director of JL Portage, and founder and president of UNEPS, and Knight of the National Order of Merit (Ordre national du Mérite).

== Biography ==
Josette Londé was born on June 15, 1953, in Dakar, Senegal.

After several years as an executive assistant for American companies, in 1986 she took a further training course at CELSA (Organisme de Formation à la Communication, a satellite of Sorbonne University in Paris), graduating in eleven months with a bachelor's and a master's degree in personnel management with honors. At the same time, she took evening classes in social law at the CNAM.

In 2000, after a few years working as a human resources manager for a number of industrial companies, she founded Architectimmo, the 1st network of independent freelance real estate negotiators.

In 2005, she became the founding president of UNEPS (Union Nationale des Entreprises de Portage Spécialisées). She lobbied the government for the legalization of Portage Salarial, which was obtained in 2008.

In 2009, Josette Londé took part in the commission to create the "auto-entrepreneur" portage system. This form of freelance administration enables self-employed people to delegate the administrative management of their business: declaring sales (and VAT if the authorized threshold is exceeded), updating income and invoicing.

She has worked for years to make life easier for entrepreneurs, earning her the Chevalier de l'Ordre National du Mérite in 2012. In 2014, she founded JL Portage, making business portage available to the self-employed and service providers, including those whose activity is regulated. From 2023, she is a president of SAS OUF, which owns the JL Portage and Architectimmo brands.
