= Modball =

International driving tour

Modball Modball
- Status: Active
- Genre: Motor tour
- Frequency: Annually
- Location: Varies
- Years active: 19
- Founded: 2007
- Founder: Jon Joseph Bourgerie
- Sponsor: AutoDS

The Modball Rally is an international driving tour with a different route each year. Founded in 2007 it sees an entry of around 100-180 cars per event which are mostly modified supercars. However, modified cars do not stop at sports cars and the rally has resulted in entries including fire engines, Ferraris, Limousines and everything else you can imagine. The Rally is not a race nor a rally in the traditional sense such as the WRC; there is no prize for being fastest nor official timekeeping of any sort. Organizers emphasize that it is a road trip adventure and not a race.

== History ==
Noted as the Nitro Circus on wheels for the stories during each event the Modball is widely known to be based on the film from the 1980s Cannonball Run, starring Burt Reynolds. The Modball Rally is not a race or timed event like most assume, the tour is a collaboration of car enthusiasts who travel Europe, USA and Australia seeking adventure.

=== 2007 Europe rally ===
The first ever Modball Rally took place in June 2007 with over 150 cars at the O2 Arena starting grid. The route began in London and ventured through Amsterdam, Cologne, Prague, Vienna with a casino party, Milan with a live performance from the Fuel Girls before finishing with an awards party in Lyon. On day two of the rally the Modball made German Television and the front page of every German newspaper for being surrounded by 100 German Police cars during a car display at the Cologne Arena. Despite having permission to go through Germany three cars were caught speeding on the hard shoulder in Düsseldorf at over 150 mph (240 km/h) resulting in the chief of German Police classing the event as an illegal street race. The result left each Modball vehicle with a fine of €173 and a Police escort to Belgium taking over 10 hours. This however didn't stop the Modballers from making the next party in Prague as they drove their cars through the night. One vehicle, a Modified Honda Type R, escaped from the policy convoy on the Autobahn and drove straight to Prague without detection - arriving almost 12hrs before any of the entrants - and they were crowned the unofficial winners for that year. It was for this reason the award for 'Spirit of the Modball' went to every team on the rally.

=== 2008 Europe Rally ===
The 2008 annual Modball Rally took place in June. The rally started in London and traveled through Geneva, Milan, Zagreb, Budapest before the awards parts in Prague, Czech Republic.

=== 2009 Europe Rally ===
The 2009 event was a road trip adventure from London to Bratislava from June 11–17. The event also included a live performance from MTV's Dirty Sanchez at the London Launch Party. The rally started in London and traveled through Paris, Lyon, Geneva, Milan, Stelvio Pass, Salzburg before the final party in Bratislava. This event received huge magazine and online video coverage including a DVD front cover of Max Power Magazine including unseen footage from the Fast and Furious movie.

=== 2009 USA Rally ===
The first USA Modball Rally received a welcome with two events running simultaneously starting on the same day and finishing at exactly the same time in Las Vegas. The West Coast route started in San Francisco then went on to Los Angeles for the Playboy Halloween Party, San Diego for a Fuel Girls live performance, Phoenix Casino Party then Las Vegas. The East Coast rally started in Chicago then traveled through Kansas City, Denver, Salt Lake City and finished in Las Vegas joining up with the West Coast Modballers for the final Modball awards Party. After the awards party the Modballers moved to the Modball SEMA party at the Bank located inside the stunning Bellagio Casino and Hotel.

The USA Modball Rally partnered up with Lexani Lifestyle who invited the drivers to a second party the following night at the Hard Rock Hotel and Casino with live performances from E-40 and Rich Boy.

=== 2010 Europe Rally ===
The 2010 event traveled from London through San Sebastian, Madrid, Barcelona, Monaco, Lyon before finishing in the center of London. The rally began in London on the June 9th and finished on June 14, 2010.

Drivers Entered included:

- Mathew Pritchard from MTV's Dirty Sanchez
- Georg Fechter from Masters of Dirt
- Fuel Girls Susie Ward, Vanessa Wise, Sam Britton

Performances...

- Fuel Girls Susie Ward, Vanessa Wise, Sam Britton

=== 2010 East Coast USA Rally ===
In 2010 Modball Rally organised two American events starting off with the East Coast. The rally started in New York City and finished in Miami, Florida after stopping in Washington DC, Tail of the Dragon, Atlanta and Orlando.

Entrants included the Fuel Girls and Mike Busey & The Busey Beauties Of The Mike Busey Live Show who toured the entire rally in a RV.

=== 2010 West Coast USA Rally ===
The west coast Modball Rally saw a huge array of cars travel from Los Angeles to San Francisco, Death Valley, Grand Canyon and Las Vegas. The rally finished in the Hardwood suite at the Palms Resort and Casino with a concert co-organised by Modball's sponsor Lexani Wheels.

=== 2011 Europe Rally ===
ROUTE: London Paris Cannes Rome Venice Geneva

The 2011 rally started with a road closure in Covent Garden, central London. After the start all participants headed to Paris for their first checkpoint.

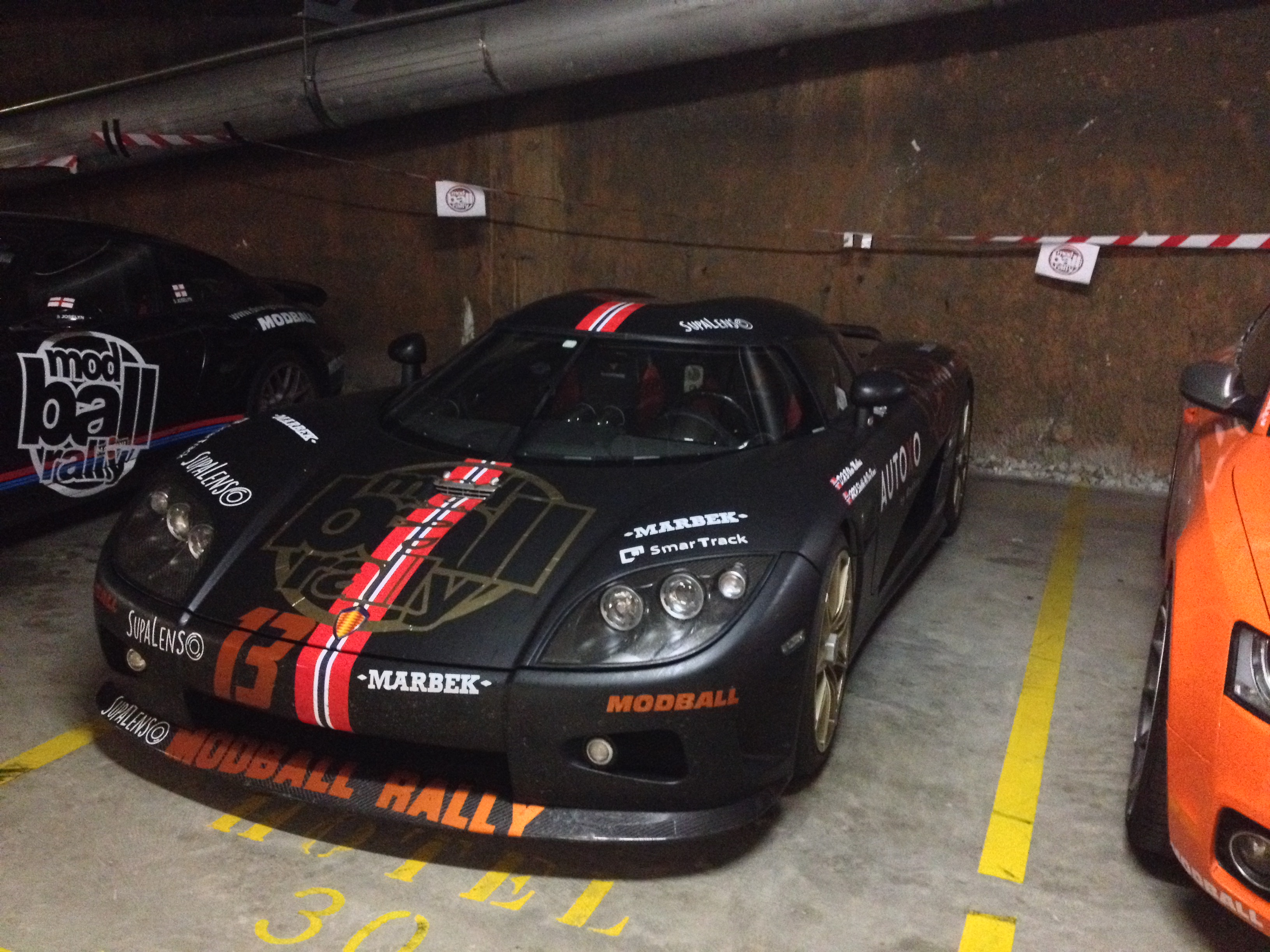
Koenigsegg CCXR at the end of the 2015 Modball Rally in Barcelona, Catalonia

=== 2012 Europe Rally ===
The rally started off in London by closing down three streets in Piccadilly Circus including Rupert Street, Oxendon Street and Coventry Street. During the launch the Queen's fly by coincided with the cars leaving the start line.

Modball rally finished the 2012 in Ibiza, Europe's party capital. 100 cars drove 2000 miles, boarded two boats over 6 days to reach their destination. The rally took place through: London, Paris, Lyon, Saint Tropez, Barcelona, Valencia, Denia, Ibiza.

=== 2013 Route ===
The 2013 European rally was announced on June 1, 2012: London, Amsterdam, Luxembourg, Zurich, Milan, Venice, Vienna, Bratislava, Prague.

=== 2014 Europe Rally ===
June 20–26: London, Paris, Lyon, Barcelona, Valencia, Denia, Ibiza.

=== 2015 Europe Rally ===
June 19–25: London, Paris, Milan, Rome, Monaco, Barcelona.

2000 Miles - 180 Cars - 7 Days - 6 Parties

== Modball Rally Clothing ==
Modball Rally Clothing was launched in 2010 as a result of the brand's increasing recognition. The clothing was created with sponsors Estate LA and Masters of Dirt and was seen for the first time on the 2010 European rally.

== iPhone Application ==
In May 2010, CoandCoUK developed an iPhone application featuring a speedometer, HUD mode and MPH/km/h converter.

== Spirit of the Modball Winners ==
The accolade of 'Spirit of the Modball' Trophy is awarded to the driver(s) each year that embody the meaning of adventure that the event strives. The Spirit of the Modball award is often awarded to the driver(s) of the vehicle that has overcome all obstacles in order to complete the 3,000 miles (4,800 km) against all odds, such as fixing their broken vehicle, or getting lost en route.
