= E-lancing =

Online freelance work

E-lancing, also known as e-labour, is the practice of taking freelancing work through online job offers. E-lancing websites or platforms operate as hubs where employers place tasks, which freelancers from around the world bid for. Some e-lancing websites act as intermediaries for payment, paying the freelancer directly after work is completed, to mitigate the risk of non-payment. Employers posting work on these websites set the price they are willing to pay for the task proposed.

== History ==
In 2012, 1.56 million people were freelancers in the United Kingdom, a rise of 11.9% since 2008. Sebastian Trenner of the World Bank wrote in 2012 that online marketplaces were unlikely to produce a significant decrease in skilled unemployment. Conversely, Karsten Geis of Empirica Capital wrote in 2014 that e-lancing would be a primary employer of the future, and that normal jobs will tend to disappear.

Notable e-lancing websites include Fiverr, Freelancer.com, Guru.com, PeoplePerHour, and Upwork.

== See also ==
- Freelancer
- Gig worker
- Online marketplace
- Online outsourcing
