= Intra-company transfer =

Reassigning an employee to another part of a company

An intra-company transfer is where a company reassigns an employee to work in a different physical office space, which may be in another country. (not to be confused with the sale of goods or services between parts of a business, which is known as an intra-company transaction).

Many countries offer expedited processes to obtain travel visas and work permits for intra-company transfers if the applicant performs certain categories of work. These categories of work may include executives, managers, long-term employees, and those with specialized expertise. The World Trade Organization's General Agreement on Trade in Services (GATS) makes provision for intra-company transfers of staff.
