= Contingent work =

Non-permanent type of employment

Contract worker prepares Ramadan meals in Guantanamo

Contingent work, casual work, gig work or contract work is an employment relationship with limited job security, payment on a piece work basis, typically part-time (typically with variable hours) that is considered non-permanent.

According to the US Bureau of Labor Statistics (BLS), the nontraditional workforce includes "multiple job holders, contingent and part-time workers, and people in alternative work arrangements". These workers currently represent a substantial portion of the US workforce, and "nearly four out of five employers, in establishments of all sizes and industries, use some form of nontraditional staffing". "People in alternative work arrangements" includes independent contractors, employees of contract companies, workers who are on call, and temporary workers.

== Terminology ==
Contingent workers are also often called consultants, freelancers, independent contractors, independent professionals, temporary contract workers, staff-augmentation workers, or temps. Contingent work jobs are widely referred to as McJobs. This term was made popular by Douglas Coupland's novel Generation X: Tales for an Accelerated Culture, and stems from the notion that employment in McDonald's and other fast food and retail businesses is frequently insecure. The term contingent workers differ from regular employees primarily in the nature of their employment relationship and contractual arrangements. Contingent workers perform services under short-term or project-based contracts, without continuous relationship with the employer, while employees typically work for an organization on a long-term basis and are included on its payroll

== History ==
=== Industrial Revolution ===
The concept of what is now considered to be a job, where one attends work at fixed hours, was rare until the Industrial Revolution. Before then, the predominant regular work was in agriculture. Textile workers would often work from home, buying raw cotton from a merchant, spinning it and weaving it into cloth at home, before selling it on.

In the 1770s, cotton mills started to appear in Lancashire, England, using Richard Arkwright's spinning jenny and powered by water wheels. Workers would often work in twelve-hour shifts, six days a week. However, they would still often be paid on a piece work basis, and fines would be deducted from their pay for damage to machinery. Employers could hire and fire largely as they pleased, and if employees had any grievance about this, there was very little that they could do about it.

=== Trade union movement ===
Individual workers were powerless to prevent exploitation by their employers. However, the realization that all workers generally want the same things, and the benefits of collective bargaining, led to the formation of the first trade unions. As trade unions became larger, their sphere of influence increased, and started to involve political lobbying, resulting in much of the employment law that is now taken for granted.

=== 20th-century decline in manufacture ===
Manufacturing has declined during the 20th century in the Western world. Many manufacturing organisations that employ large numbers of people have relocated their operations to developing nations. As a result, whenever they do hire staff in Europe or North America, they often need to be able to fire them quickly and keep costs as low as possible, to remain competitive. As a result, some employers may look for loopholes in employment law, or ways of engaging staff that allows them to circumvent union-negotiated employment law, creating what is now known as contingent work.

== Contributing factors and trends ==
=== Benefits to organizations ===
By engaging contract workers, organizations are able to be agile and save costs. The contingent workforce acts as a variable workforce for companies to select from to perform specific projects or complete specialized projects.

Also as organizations make efforts to be more agile and to quickly respond to change in order to be more competitive, they turn to the contingent workforce to have on-demand access to professionals and experts. Organizations also see the opportunity to reduce benefits and retirement costs by engaging the contingent workforce. However, there is risk involved in avoiding these costs if an employee is improperly classified as a contingent worker. Using the contingent workforce is also cost-effective in that using contingent labor allows for adjustments to employment levels and employment costs depending on what kind of expertise and labor is need and at what time it is needed.

=== Economy ===
Trends in the contingent workforce are also impacted by the economy. A study conducted by the MPS Group shows the relationship between the contingent labor cycle and the state of the economy. In an expanding economy, the demand for contingent labor is strong. This is most likely because organizations are trying to grow with the economy, and using contingent workers allows them to work with experts when needed, without the long-term costs of hiring them.

=== Globalization ===
Among several other contributing factors, globalization has had a large impact on the growth in using contingent labor. Globalization contributes to rapid growth in industries, increased outsourcing, and a need for flexibility and agility to remain competitive.

=== Knowledge-driven economy ===
A knowledge-driven economy also contributes to the growth in the use of the contingent workforce because organizations rely more on their specific and expert knowledge and expertise. As demand increases for highly skilled and knowledgeable people, the expertise of contract workers becomes more attractive.

=== Occupational injuries and fatalities ===
Contingent workers are at a high risk of being injured or killed on the job. In 2014, 797 fatal injuries (17% of all occupational fatalities) occurred among contract workers, which only represent a subset of contingent workers. Studies have also shown a higher burden of non-fatal occupational injuries and illnesses among contingent workers compared to those in standard employment arrangements.

There are many possible contributing factors to the high rates of injuries and illnesses among contingent workers. They are often inexperienced and assigned to hazardous jobs and tasks, may be reluctant to object to unsafe working conditions or to advocate for safety measures for fear of job loss or other repercussions, and they may lack basic knowledge and skills to protect themselves from workplace hazards due to insufficient safety training.

According to a joint guidance document released by the Occupational Safety and Health Administration (OSHA) and the National Institute for Occupational Safety and Health (NIOSH), both staffing agencies and host employers in the United States (clients of staffing agencies) are responsible for providing and maintaining a safe and healthy work environment for contingent workers. Collaborative and interdisciplinary (e.g., epidemiology, occupational psychology, organizational science, economics, law, management, sociology, labor health and safety) research and intervention efforts are needed to protect and promote the occupational safety and health of contingent workers.

In 2022, NIOSH and partners released a set of occupational safety and health best practices for host employers of temporary workers. Checklists to foster adoption of the best practices and a slide deck staffing companies can use to educate their host employer clients about the best practices are also included.

== See also ==
- Adjunct professor
- Contract attorney
- Day labor
- Dispatched labor
- Ghost Work
- Human capital
- Independent contractor-employee distinction
- National Safety Council
- Permatemp
- Precariat
- Precarious work
- Precarity
- Psychological contract
- Temporary work
- Workforce casualisation
- Zero-hour contract
