= National Independent Contractors Association =

The National Independent Contractors Association, or NICA, is a United States-based organization that describes itself as an alliance of independent contractors. It was founded in 1995 as a corporation by Thomas McGrath, a former contractor in the transportation industry. According to NICA's website, its purpose is to provide services giving administrative support to independent contractors, but particularly for individuals who work as couriers or messengers (i.e., parcel or mail pickup and delivery, whether doing parcel pickup and delivery by bicycle or by automobile or motorcycle or other motorized vehicle or by serving as a walker).

== Insurance Fraud ==
On May 6, 2006, Frank Green of the San Diego Union-Tribune reported that "the San Diego County District Attorney's Office has issued a 50-count indictment against Thomas M. McGrath, founder and president of NICA Inc., and seven other company officials for allegedly filing false insurance claims worth hundreds of thousands of dollars. ... McGrath and the other NICA executives were arrested in Massachusetts on Wednesday." A year later, "Thomas McGrath, Dan Curran and David Kenyon were sentenced to 1 day in jail, 3 years probation, and ordered to pay $350,000 in restitution, and $14,000 investigative costs," according to a California Department of Insurance annual report. "The eight were charged with one count of conspiracy to commit premium fraud, six counts of premium fraud, and 43 counts of filing false injury claims in a scheme that totaled more than $600,000 in losses," said the report.
