= Independent contractor-employee distinction =

Distinction in employment law

False self-employment is a situation in which a person registered as self-employed, a freelancer, or a temp is de facto an employee carrying out a professional activity under the authority and subordination of another company. Such false self-employment is often a way to circumvent social welfare and employment legislation, for example by avoiding employer's social security and income tax contributions. While a modern "gig economy" encourages more casual employment practices in the interests of labour flexibility, the extent to which this disguises precarious employment and denial of rights is of growing concern to authorities.

There is a grey area of self-employed persons who rely heavily on a single customer while legitimately being independent.

== Principle ==
A salaried-work relation hidden behind a false pretense of self-employment is in some jurisdictions a violation of and a non‑compliance with labour law.

For social security, the falsely self-employed is declared not to be subject to employment law, but actually works under an employer's authority in a subordinate relationship, with the same conditions as his salaried colleagues but without any employment contract.

When a salaried-work relation is hidden under such a false pretense, there is a violation of law and both parties expose themselves to sanctions.

The constitutive elements of an employment contract typically are:

- Work performed;
- for remuneration;
- in a subordinate relationship.

== In Britain ==
=== Construction industry ===
A British trade union UCATT which specialized in the construction industry has expressed concern that false self-employment was being used by many British employers to evade taxes and engage workers without having to respect employment rights and entitlements such as holiday pay, sick pay and pensions. In their opinion, whilst the practice was immoral, it was not, in their view, necessarily illegal.

The UK taxation arrangement known as the Construction Industry Scheme (CIS) allowed registered companies to deduct tax at source and thus avoid employing workers directly as their regular or casual employee who would thus have acquired legal employee rights.

Instead casual staff could be assumed to be sub-contractors who were falsely supposed to be self-employed, and thus responsible for paying their own tax and social security contributions.

If such persons were not registered as self-employed, they would thereby be liable for unlawfully evading their legal obligations.

=== Offshore oil ===
The British Government's HM Revenue and Customs service found in 2013 evidence that some companies and employment businesses connected with the offshore oil industry were using employment intermediaries to disguise the employment of their workers as self-employment, primarily to avoid paying employers National Insurance contributions and to reduce the costs associated with workers’ employment rights.

== Egypt ==
Egypt's Labour Law No 12 of 2003 and its executive decrees do not expressly regulate the relationship between independent contractors and their employers. These relationships are contractually regulated by way of an agreement between the parties, so the executed contract forms the legal basis for the relationship between them. "Accordingly, the employer and the contractor are free to define their rights and obligations as they deem fit, without prejudice to the general rules and regulations of Egyptian law."

== Spain ==
The Spanish Ministry of Employment is trying (as of mid August 2017) to address commercial accounting agencies who invoice employers on behalf of regular employees falsely presented self-employed persons to evade or minimise their tax and social security obligations (Self employed people are known as autónomos in Spanish, and usually raise their own invoices for irregular work assignments themselves). Fidelis Factu Sociedad Cooperativa, better known as Factoo, has been obliged to close its operation following a sanction imposed by the Ministry. There are known to be several other cooperatives of this type, although Factoo is the largest so far identified and the first to be shut down.

Although the persecution of false freelancers, by the Labor Inspectorate in Spain, has intensified in recent times, there are still many entrepreneurs who encourage covering up an employment relationship with a false business relationship. It's essential to differentiate an employment relationship (employer-employee) from a business relationship (entrepreneur-self-employed). The legal definition of employed worker found in art. 1.1 of the Spanish Workers’ Statute mentions these four defining notes: willfulness, alienation, dependence and remuneration.

== United States ==
The United States maintains a legal distinction between independent contractors and employees for tax treatment and for the Fair Labor Standards Act (FLSA). The distinction has been contested since the passage of the FLSA, with employers often attempting the misclassification of employees as independent contractors. Similar practices exist in other countries, where is often known as false self-employment.

The U.S. Government Accountability Office (GAO) reports that the IRS claims to lose millions of dollars in uncollected payroll, social security, Medicare and unemployment insurance taxes because of misclassification of independent contractors by taxpayers.

== See also ==
- Umbrella company
- IR35 (UK)
- Permatemp
