= Inside contracting =

Hiring of contractors from inside the proprietor's factory

Inside contracting is the practice of hiring contractors who work inside the proprietor's factory. It replaced the putting-out system, where contractors worked in their own facilities. Inside contracting was the system favored by the Springfield and Harpers Ferry Armories. Since the manufacturing system developed in the armories was broadly adopted, manufacturers in the early 19th century tended to hire people trained in the armories as managers. They brought with them the practice of inside contracting.

The manufacturer hired inside contractors and provided materials and machinery. Each inside contractor was expected to hire his own employees and meet certain production and quality goals, but everything else was left to him. As a result, the system rewarded ingenuity on the contractors' part, but also rewarded their self-serving local optimization. For example, it was to the inside contractor's benefit to allow machinery to deteriorate toward the end of his contract since maintenance was costly and he might not reap the long-term benefit if he didn't get another contract. The system was eventually replaced by the factory system, where all workers became direct employees of the manufacturer.

== See also ==
- Independent contractor
