= Online outsourcing =

Online outsourcing is the business process of contracting third-party providers, which can be overseas, to supply products or services which are delivered and paid for via the Internet.

== Internet-based outsourcing ==
Online outsourcing is the Internet-based version of outsourcing. This process is when one department, or indeed a whole area of work, transfers tasks and projects to a third party company.

Examples of such tasks could be programming, web development and web design, multi-media production, logo design or search engine optimization not forgetting services like translations, research and editorial work. In this case, online platforms can serve to simplify the process of attaining and assigning project based work. IT work that is outsourced is temporary and assembled to providing short-term support, rather than working through the entire product lifecycle.

Offshoring is a variant of outsourcing, respective tasks can be offshored by situating them in another country. This could be both a business task or indeed an entire business process. Nearshoring is a variant of offshoring. Tasks are not relocated to a country that is very far afield on another continent. Instead tasks are nearshored closer to the home country.

Homeshoring, as a variant of outsourcing, describes the location of third party services which are not undertaken by companies but by remote workers.

== Benefits of online outsourcing ==
Information technology (IT) outsourcing, and any kind of digital outsourcing, can result in consequential knowledge transfer that benefit the sourcing partner in the longrun.

Through online outsourcing a company can relieve itself of secondary tasks and concentrate on core issues, thus improving its efficiency. Or as Peter Drucker expressed it, "Do what you can do best and Outsource the rest."

According to Deloitte’s research, the primary reason to outsource jobs is to save costs. The second reason is to focus on core competencies. However, 47% of companies outsource to solve capacity issues.

== Backsourcing ==
A survey published in 2018 showed that up to 70% of US companies had negative experiences with IT offshoring, about 25% of the companies therefore brought previously outsourced service jobs back inhouse. Backsourcing retrieves an outsourced activity, once the outsourcing contract has expired or is formally terminated. Apart from letting go of a problematic cost and quality expectations, backsourcing can also be motivated by the desire to take advantage of new market opportunities. IT outsourcing contracts are supposed to provide a safety net on which both contracting parties can rely, however the need for future IT services can hardly be defined in a outsourcing contract. Ideally the contracting parties agree a mechanism to cope with changes that are not even considered in the contract.

== See also ==
- E-lancing
- Virtual assistance
