= IR35 =

United Kingdom tax law for individuals paid through personal service companies

IR35 is the United Kingdom's anti-avoidance tax legislation, the intermediaries legislation contained in Chapter 8 of Income Tax (Earnings and Pensions) Act 2003. The legislation is designed to tax 'disguised' employment at a rate similar to employment. In this context, "disguised employees" means workers who receive payments from a client via an intermediary, e.g. their own limited company, and whose relationship with their client is such that had they been paid directly they would be employees of the client.

Under Chapter 8, the worker of the limited company is responsible for assessing their IR35 status under the rules and paying the appropriate National Insurance and Income Tax to HMRC.

New legislation was introduced on 6 April 2017 (Chapter 10 Income Tax (Earnings & Pensions) Act 2003) to make public sector organisations responsible for assessing whether an individual providing services for their organisation on a contract basis fell under IR35 rules, and for paying the National Insurance and Income tax to HMRC where relevant.

These rules (referred to as the off-payroll working rules) were extended to apply to private sector businesses that were classed as medium or large per the Companies Act 2006 as of 6 April 2021. This led to some lorry drivers deciding to retire, and thus contributed to the shortfall of lorry drivers in the UK.

In the September 2022 United Kingdom mini-budget it was announced that the 2017 and 2021 reforms to IR35 would be repealed, at a cost of £6.19 billion over 5 years. On 17 October 2022 however, the newly appointed Chancellor of the Exchequer, Jeremy Hunt, announced that the repeal would not go ahead and Chapter 10 would remain in place.

== Background and context ==
In 1999, as part of that year's Budget, the UK's Chancellor of the Exchequer, Gordon Brown, announced that measures would be introduced to counter tax avoidance by the use of so-called "personal service companies". Properly known as the "Intermediaries Legislation", it is more commonly referred to by the consecutively numbered Inland Revenue (now HMRC) budget press release number 35 in which it was announced (i.e. the 35th Inland Revenue news release of that budget), entitled Countering Avoidance in the Provision of Personal Services. The press release was issued on 9 March 1999, the same day as the Chancellor of the Exchequer's Budget Statement. The term was firstly applied by the campaign group the Professional Contractors Group who led the campaign against the new tax on the basis that it was a useful shorthand.

IR35 came into force throughout the UK in April 2000. Although it was part of that year's Finance Act and was not law at the start of the Financial Year, the Act backdated its commencement to 6 April 2000. The legislation has been consolidated in the Income Tax (Earnings and Pensions) Act 2003 and in the Statutory Instrument Social Security Contributions (Intermediaries) Regulations 2000, SI 2000/727. The Finance Act 2017 implements changes in the process for determining the amount of Income Tax and National Insurance to be deducted.

Before IR35 was introduced, workers who owned their own limited companies were allowed to receive payments from clients directly to the company and to use the company revenue as would any small company. Company profits could be distributed as dividends, which are not subject to National Insurance payments. Workers could also save tax by splitting ownership of the company with family members in order to place income in lower tax bands. (This latter practice was recommended by government publications advising on setting up family businesses, but attacked as tax fraud by other government departments, notably the Treasury. It came under a separate, ultimately unsuccessful attack in 2007; see S660A.) Professional advisors now do not recommend that family members should be allocated shares in the company unless they perform a significant role in the business (not just bookkeeping).

On 20 May 2010, the new Liberal Democrat/Conservative coalition government's Programme for Government announced a commitment to "review IR 35, as part of a wholesale review of all small business taxation, and seek to replace it with simpler measures that prevent tax avoidance but do not place undue administrative burdens or uncertainty on the self-employed, or restrict labour market flexibility." On 10 March 2011 the Office of Tax Simplification recommended that the Treasury should suspend IR35 or compel HM Revenue and Customs (HMRC) to make changes to its implementation until wider structural reform to integrate Income Tax and NIC is introduced. After that, the Chancellor announced the Government would keep IR35 'as is' during Budget 2011, but with changes to HMRC administration and to create a new IR35 Forum. This IR35 Forum has achieved little since it was created and there appears to be little interest in the published monthly meeting minutes.

Historically, it had been advantageous for the owners of small limited companies to take all of their wages in one month, thereby only incurring NI contributions once (up to the monthly ceiling) instead of paying a regular contribution every month like most employees. This ploy had been circumvented some years prior to the introduction of IR35 by imposing NI on the total annual income of directors as if it were spread over the year, even if only paid by one payment. The increased usage of dividend payments instead of wages was partly a reaction to this change. An additional sense of grievance felt by those who were driven to incorporate, for whatever reason, was the large disparity between the National Insurance burden on companies and employees (>20% if the employer's contribution is included) and that imposed on the self-employed.

The stated aim of the measure was to prevent workers from setting up limited companies via which they would work effectively as employees, but saving on Income Tax and National Insurance. The so-called "Friday to Monday" scenario, that it was possible for a worker to leave a job on Friday and return on Monday to be doing the same work for the same company, but as a contractor via their own limited company paying a dividend as opposed to earnings which would incur less Income Tax and no payment of National Insurance and was cited in the press release as the anomaly being corrected. In such a scenario, HM Revenue and Customs would be allowed to "look through" the contractual arrangement between the worker's company and the client company and to formulate a "hypothetical contract" which showed that the worker was a "disguised employee". Case law — judge Malachy Cornwell-Kelly has observed that there is "considerable case law on this subject" — refers to the exercise of formulating such a contract as a "statutory hypothesis":

the legislation enacts a statutory hypothesis and asks one to suppose that the services in question were provided under a contract made directly between the client … and the worker …. If that hypothetical contract would be regarded for income tax purposes as a contract of employment (or service), the legislation will apply. Conversely, if the hypothetical contract would not be so regarded, the legislation will not apply.

The fee paid to the worker's company would then be taxed as a salary. Normal employment status rules should be applied when considering IR35 status and the view of HM Revenue and Customs can be successfully challenged.

In reality, the majority of one-person limited companies have to operate through an agency. This means that the agency has a contractual agreement with their client to supply an individual. The agency then has a contract with the one-person limited company to supply the services. The responsibility for determining and deducting the correct rates of Income Tax and National Insurance lies with the worker or company but under the Finance Act 2017, where a public authority engages the worker, the responsibility for making this determination and deducting the correct amounts transfers to the public authority for payments made on or after 6 April 2017.

The term "personal service company" is not defined in law, but it is used by the UK government to refer to "someone who works through their own limited company" as opposed to someone who is self-employed and pays Class 2 and Class 4 National Insurance.

== Support ==
The main arguments adduced in favour of IR35 are that:

- there are clearly cases of "Friday to Monday" — leaving on Friday as an employee and returning on Monday to the same job as a hired consultant — which would be considered to be avoiding the payment of the correct Income Tax and National Insurance;
- it is unfair that two workers performing the same tasks should pay different rates of Income Tax and National Insurance when there is no difference between their working arrangements; and
- the personal service company pays Corporation Tax on the dividends paid to the disguised worker operating through his personal service company and is considerably lower than personal Income Tax. Dividends do not attract National Insurance so therefore the worker would pay no National Insurance.

The argument about workers doing the same tasks and paying the same tax is one that has often been used, but it has no basis in law. The type of work being done is irrelevant, and only the nature of the relationship between workers and hirer is examined in the courts.

The dividend tax regime was changed in April 2016, pretty much wiping out the tax advantage for contractors, who now pay roughly the same amount of tax as an employee when considering the corporation tax and dividend taxes combined. The remaining issue for Government is that hirers do not pay employers NI of 15% (13.8% prior to April 2025) when hiring the self-employed.

== Criticism ==
IR35 has been criticised by several bodies, including former Ernst & Young tax partner Anne Redston.

Some of the key criticisms levelled at the measure include:

- IR35 does not achieve its stated aim of taxing those within IR35 at the same level as employees since those within IR35 also pay Employers' NI in addition to Employees NI. This results in higher levels of tax being paid by those within IR35.
- Its complexity and its harmful impact on many small companies that exist for reasons other than tax avoidance or evasion. These include many companies owned by IT professionals, who often have many short-term contracts rather than one steady engagement.
- That its effects extend far beyond the Friday to Monday scenario envisaged in the original press release, which indeed has never been discussed much since.
- IR35 ignores the risk taken on by freelance workers, e.g. no guarantee of work, no sickness or pension benefits.
- Each contract that the Intermediary company undertakes is viewed separately, which means that one contract with client A could be considered disguised employment and a contract with client B considered to be non-employment. HMRC is reluctant to give an opinion on a contract at the time of signing the agreement on the basis that the actual working terms and conditions, in reality, could be considerably different from the terms of the agreement.
- Many contracts between the Intermediary company and the client company are generic and rarely go into the details of the actual nature of the work to be undertaken and the working arrangements between the two parties.
- That it is unjust that workers in small family businesses should be taxed as if they were employed by their clients, yet not receive any of the legal, state, and other benefits received by "normal" employees.
- HMRC requires the Intermediary company to state whether it is inside or outside IR35 on the annual P35 declaration leaving the company with the responsibility to engage an expert to decide the company's tax liability.
- Many businesses now feed off these Intermediary companies promising that they will help negotiate an IR35-friendly contract, however, it is not just the contract that HMRC considers but the actual working arrangements between the worker and the client business.
- There is little evidence that it raises any significant amount of money.
- It renders small businesses uncompetitive with large consultancies and encourages the use of off-shoring avoidance schemes, most of which HMRC now pretends they have closed, leaving the worker with a huge tax bill. Umbrella scheme arrangements remain commonplace in 2021, as shown in multi-media adverts in airports and the like.
- The calculation of a "deemed payment" under the legislation is considered very complex: the calculation involves 11 separate stages, some of which are recursively dependent on others.
- The introduction of IR35 combined with its complexity and ambiguity, led many freelancers into a number of Tax Planning schemes that led to a further loss of revenue to HMRC; however over the recent years these tax planning schemes have been closed down by HMRC.
- From April 2020 to April 2021 the vast majority of corporates shifted the self-employed from contracts onto fixed-term PAYE contracts as they decided that the risk of an HMRC investigation on their use of contractors/temporary workers was too great. This has resulted in further tax revenue losses as Employer NICs have been taken off many temporary worker's PAYE contracts in addition to the VAT and Corporation Tax loss to The Revenue.

In May 2017, NHS Improvement backtracked on previous guidance that all NHS agency and locum workers would be included in the IR35 taxation laws. The new guidance stated that NHS organisations should assess workers on a "case by case basis". This u-turn was in response to an exchange under the pre-action protocol of Judicial Review by IHPA (then known as the Locum Doctors Union). Many NHS locums such as nurses, physiotherapists and doctors below consultant level in the NHS are automatically deemed to be employees, a practice which has attracted strong criticism from the industry as reportedly unlawful and is at odds with numerous judgments in which courts have found doctors to be self-employed. There has also been significant criticism of blanket approaches in national newspapers - both in terms of the lawfulness of the practice and asserting that it is driving workers into loan schemes. Many workers in the social services sector also supply their services through their own limited companies which would be considered disguised employment by HMRC if the circumstances were such that a court might consider the arrangement akin to employment.

== Effectiveness ==
It is hard to judge the effectiveness of the legislation since as of 2010 HMRC has not published any figures. On 6 January 2004 Dawn Primarolo was asked in Parliament how many investigations under the IR35 regulation have (a) been initiated, (b) resulted in additional revenue, and (c) been concluded without securing additional revenue. In a written answer she replied that it was not possible with any accuracy to isolate data relating solely to this legislation.

On 15 June 2009 in the House of Commons Labour MP Terry Rooney (Bradford North) asked the Chancellor of the Exchequer "how many investigations concerning IR35 were launched in each of the last five years; and how many of them resulted in (a) prosecution, (b) an increase in tax due and (c) no further action". Kitty Ussher speaking for the Chancellor replied, "The intermediaries legislation, commonly known as 'IR35', was introduced with effect from 6 April 2000 to counter the avoidance of employed levels of tax and national insurance by individuals providing their services through intermediaries. Disclosure of HM Revenue and Customs compliance data relating to the legislation would result in a risk of non-compliance with the legislation. Accordingly, I am not able to provide the data requested." The July 2009 issue of IT Now, the British Computer Society magazine, reported that between April 2002 and March 2008 the Government had raised £9.2 million under IR35 legislation compared to the £220 million that was initially expected.

== Revenue raised ==
The initial regulatory impact assessment for IR35 in 1999 stated that HMRC expected the measure to generate £220 million per year in National Insurance contributions and a further £80 million in income tax.

On 6 Jan 2004 Dawn Primarolo was asked by the Shadow Paymaster General Mark Prisk MP about additional revenue secured from investigations under IR35. She replied that "Establishing whether or not the intermediaries legislation applies is undertaken as part of the Inland Revenue's Employer Compliance Review programme. As such it is not possible with any accuracy to isolate data relating solely to this legislation." She gave a similar answer when asked about administration and employment costs.

In May 2009 the Professional Contractors Group received a reply to a request under the Freedom of Information Act to HMRC, asking just how much tax revenue IR35 had in fact raised for the exchequer. The FOI reply revealed that in the tax years 2002/03 to 2007/08, IR35 directly raised just £9.2 million. This equates to an average of around only £1.5 million per tax year, less than 1% of the expected amount. It is not clear whether this includes the NI contribution, or is just income tax.

In September 2011 a Freedom of Information Act request revealed that the number of cases reviewed had fallen from 158 (year ending April 2007) to 12 in the year ending April 2010 and 23 in the year ending April 2011. The same document also gives the "tax yield received for the requested years" as having fallen from £1,906,619 to £219,180. No details are given for the costs of the investigations or the costs of collecting the tax. It is not clear whether this figure relates to the revenue raised from investigations or the total revenue from IR35. No figures were given for the cost of administrating the tax, or the cost of the investigations.

== Public sector reform ==
Until April 2017, it was the responsibility of a contractor's limited company (PSC) to deal with the process of determining the IR35 status (separately, for any and all labour-only contracts that the PSC had entered into). Any associated Tax and NI liability fell on the PSC. However, in the Chancellor's Autumn Statement in 2016, the government intimated that it would reform what it calls the "Intermediary Legislation".

On 6 April 2017, a reform of the IR35 was introduced by HMRC in the public sector. It became the responsibility of the public authorities employing contractors to determine the contractor's employment status for tax purposes. The reform was introduced by HMRC to "ensure that individuals who work through their own company pay broadly equivalent taxes as employees, where they would be employed if they were taken on directly". An online tool (known as "CEST": Check Employment Status for Tax) was made available by HMRC to enable workers or employers to determine employment status for tax purposes. A revised version of the tool was issued in November 2019 following a stakeholder consultation exercise.

CEST has received some criticism in that the contractual concept of "mutuality of obligation" does not figure within the CEST assessment. HMRC defended the exclusion of mutuality of obligation (or "MOO") as a factor in its IR35 Forum meeting with industry representatives on 11 December 2017, arguing that it could be assumed that anyone using CEST was already aware of a contractual obligation being in place.

HMRC estimated it raised an additional £550m in income tax and National Insurance Contributions in the first year following the introduction of the reform.

== Private sector reform ==
HMRC estimated the cost of non-compliance with the IR35 legislation in the private sector to be £1.2bn annually by 2022/23. It announced the extension of the IR35 reform to medium and large companies in the private sector and charities, applicable from 6 April 2020. The end client was given responsibility for assessing whether the person was an employee. This was irrespective of whether there were one or more intermediaries between the worker and the end client. The end client was also made responsible for paying lost National Insurance if they made an incorrect assessment.

On 17 March 2020, it was announced that the reform to the private sector would be postponed to 6 April 2021 due to the COVID-19 outbreak. The reforms became effective on 6 April 2021.

Following the introduction of the private sector reform, there have since been multiple tools to help those inside IR35 determine what their take home pay could look like.

== Section 8(1) decisions ==
National Insurance Regulations state that only 'The Minister' can make determinations of status, of the sort that are required to establish IR35 liability. Therefore a PSC is entitled to ask for a Section 8(1) decision, where it is unable to agree on IR35 liability with HMRC. The obstacle to this remains that HMRC has created no process whereby a Section 8(1) decision can be requested. The legislation can be found at: https://www.legislation.gov.uk/uksi/2000/727?timeline=false.

Anyone who uses HMRC's "CEST" tool, and finds that the status of their contract cannot be determined could seek a Section 8(1) determination, and request acknowledgment that they have made such a request. This would protect them from any later suggestion that they have not taken due care in establishing IR35 status.

== See also ==
- Umbrella company
- UK labour law
- UK tax law
- Freelancer
- Independent contractor
- Independent contractor-employee distinction
