= Umbrella company =

Type of legal entity

An umbrella company is a company that employs agency contractors who work on temporary contract assignments, usually through a recruitment agency in the United Kingdom. Recruitment agencies prefer to issue contracts to a limited company to reduce their own liability. It issues invoices to the recruitment agency (or client) and, when payment of the invoice is made, will typically pay the contractor through PAYE with the added benefit of offsetting some of the income through claiming expenses such as travel, meals, and accommodation.

Umbrella companies have become more prevalent in the UK since the British government introduced so-called "IR35" legislation that creates tests to determine employment status and ability to make use of small company tax reliefs. According to criteria set out by the UK Department for Business, Innovation & Skills, there are an estimated 4 million temporary workers in the UK, of whom 1.56 million are "classed as being in a management or senior official role, a professional occupation or an associate professional and technical occupation." It is estimated that 14% of the UK's professional contractors are currently managing their business by working through an umbrella company.

== Structure ==
An umbrella company processes timesheets received from the employee/contractor, then issues an invoice to the client for payment.

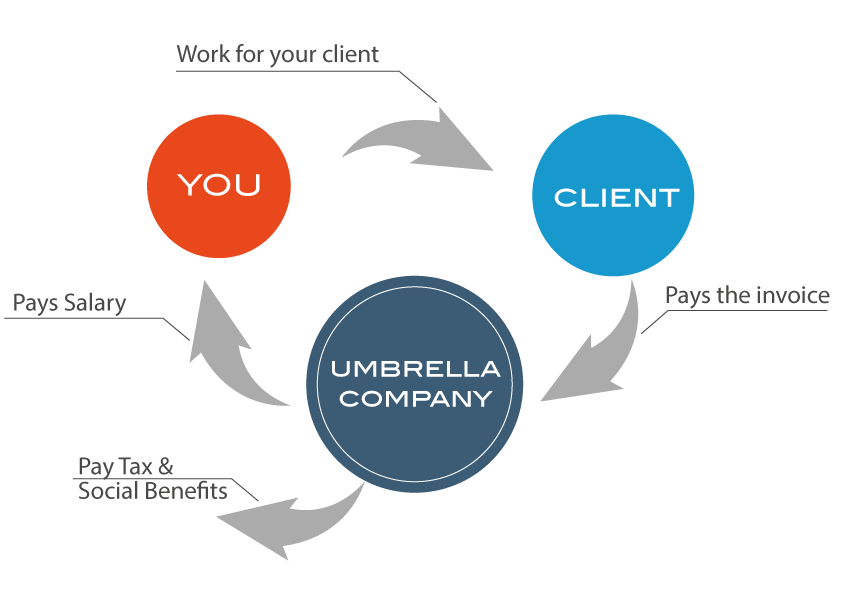
Flowchart of Umbrella Employment

An umbrella company is an employer, and so each contractor working with such a company signs a Contract of Employment, also referred to as a contract of service. The rights and obligations with regard to maternity pay, sick pay, and employment protection are outlined in this contract. A large corpus of case law offers clarification on the definition of a service contract.

The umbrella company provides payroll services on behalf of the contractor and bills the agency (who in turn bills the client) for work completed by the contractor. The umbrella company provides all social contribution and tax payments (including "PAYE, Pay As You Earn" in certain jurisdictions) and equivalents and National Insurance returns on behalf of the contractor.

The client is effectively the company for whom the contractor works. This may be within any industry and across all levels of employment. The client often elects to use contractors as it affords them the ability to temporarily augment their staff or capability without the burden of the legal requirements associated with permanent employees (PAYE, NI, sick pay, insurances etc.). Using contractors also facilitates special skills and typically provides the advantage of a broader skill set, as the contractor has typically worked many companies and organizations during prior contracts.

The agency, if involved, performs the recruitment process on behalf of the client. Some agencies will provide a PAYE scheme as part of their offer. This alleviates the requirement for the umbrella company but requires additional capability within the organization including professional accountants and adherence to fiscal laws. Most agencies elect to utilize an umbrella company, which provides additional benefits to the contractor.

The contractor or employee of the umbrella company completes the actual work, completes a timesheet and submits this (typically via fax or secure web portal) along with any expense claims to the umbrella company.

== Expenses and taxes ==
All umbrella companies use the same PAYE calculations to ascertain how much tax should be paid. The only difference between umbrella companies will be the margin that they retain and the schemes they run.

Some of the most common "allowable" expenses include: mileage & general travel expenses, hotel and accommodation expenses and professional subscriptions. Food and subsistence is rarely allowed to be claimed, as it is HMRC's opinion that you would eat regardless as to whether you are working or not. The exception to this rule is if you were staying away from home as part of the work.

As an employee of an Umbrella Company you may be entitled to claim assignment related contractor expenses, if you engage in a number of assignments, based at different workplaces, during a single period of employment. If you know you will only work on a single assignment during your employment, your workplace automatically meets HMRC's definition of a permanent workplace and therefore travel and accommodation expense claims are not permitted.

The 2008 HM Treasury pre-budget report reported on the consultation on the use of travel expenses in conjunction with being employed via umbrella companies. The document questioned the validity and fairness of allowing business expenses in this form suggesting that an overarching employment contract was not a form of employment that allowed travel and subsistence expenses. HMT decided that the legislation would remain as is but suggested additional HMRC policing would be carried out to reduce cases of non-compliance. HMT issued the results of the consultation in December 2008.

Supervision, Direction and Control (SDC) came into effect on 6 April 2016 as a way of limiting the number of umbrella contractors being able to claim travel and subsistence expenses. As a whole, tax relief is not available for home-to-work travel and related subsistence to workers in a permanent role. This is, as of April 2016, the same for contractors working through umbrella companies.

In April 2026, HMRC will introduce changes to Umbrella Company legislation (ESM2420) that will see umbrella companies, recruitment agencies and/or end clients in an umbrella company supply chain become jointly and severally liable for unpaid taxes such as PAYE and National Insurance Contributions. Commonly known as Umbrella Joint & Several Liability, these changes aim to reduce tax losses from non-compliant umbrella companies and provide greater protection to the contractor workforce.

== Benefits ==
Umbrella companies broadly provide similar sets of benefits to contractors:

1. a standard set of statutory payments such as statutory sick pay (SSP), statutory maternity pay (SMP), holiday pay etc.
2. a workplace pension scheme - as contractors are legally defined as employed when using an umbrella company, the umbrella must offer to pay into a workplace pension scheme.
3. other employment life style benefits such as clinical counselling, legal support, dependent care, and critical incident support. Additional benefits may include salary sacrifice on personal pension contributions, specialist mortgage advice or inclusive reward schemes.

== Charges ==
Umbrella companies normally keep a part of the income or charge a margin for processing contractors' payroll and for some umbrella companies it will go towards contractors insurances. In France, Belgium and Sweden, it is usually a percentage of the invoiced amount. In the UK, it is mostly a fixed weekly amount.

== International links ==
The American professional employer organization PEO (Professional Employers Organization) offering co-employment for small companies.
