= Freelancer =

Self-employed worker with no committed employer

Freelance (sometimes spelled free-lance or free lance), freelancer, and freelance worker are common terms for a person who is self-employed and not necessarily committed to a particular employer long-term. Freelance workers are sometimes represented by a company or a temporary agency that resells freelance labor to clients. Others work independently or use professional associations or websites to get work.

While the term independent contractor is preferred in a legal or financial context, such as to designate the tax and employment classes of this type of worker, the term "freelancing" is most common in culture and creative industries, and use of this term may indicate participation therein.

Fields, professions, and industries where freelancing is predominant include: music, writing, acting, computer programming, web design, graphic design, translating and illustrating, film and video production, and other forms of piece work that some cultural theorists consider central to the cognitive-cultural economy.

== Freelance practices ==
=== Types of work ===
According to the 2012 Freelance Industry Report compiled primarily about North America freelancing, nearly half of freelancers do writing work, with 18% of freelancers listing writing as a primary skill, 10% editing/copy-editing, and 10% as copywriting. 20% of freelancers listed their primary skills as design. Next on the list was translating (8%), web development (5.5%), and marketing (4%).

In 2018, freelancing was projected to grow to $20–$30 billion in the next 5–7 years in India, and the freelancers in the US will comprise 40% (approx.) of the workforce at the projected growth rate from the same time.

=== Compensation ===
Depending on the industry, freelance work practices vary and have changed over time. In some industries such as consulting, freelancers may require clients to sign written contracts. While in journalism or writing, freelancers may work for free or do work "on spec" to build their reputations or a relationship with a publication. Some freelancers may provide written estimates of work and request deposits from clients.

Payment for freelance work also depends on industry, skills, experience and location. Freelancers may charge by the day, hour, per piece, or on a per-project basis. Instead of a flat rate or fee, some freelancers have adopted a value-based pricing method based on the perceived value of the results to the client. By custom, payment arrangements may be upfront, percentage upfront, or upon completion. For more complex projects, a contract may set a payment schedule based on milestones or outcomes. One of the drawbacks of freelancing is that there is no guaranteed payment, and the work can be highly precarious. In order to ensure payment, many freelancers use online payment platforms to protect themselves or work with local clients that can be held accountable.

=== Copyright ===
The question of ownership of a work's copyright arises when its author produces it on behalf of a client. The matter is governed by copyright law, which varies by country. The default ownership lies with the client in some countries and with the freelancing author in others. The degree to which either moral or economic ownership of a work for hire may be modified contractually varies by country.

== Demographics ==
A 2018 McKinsey study found that up to 162 million people in Europe and the United States engage in some form of independent work. It represents 20–30 percent of the entire working age population.

The total number of freelancers in USA is inexact, as of 2013, the most recent governmental report on independent contractors was published in 2005 by the U.S. Department of Labor Bureau of Labor Statistics. At that time, there were approximately 10.3 million United States workers (7.4% of the workforce) employed as independent contractors of all sorts. In 2011, Jeffrey Eisenach, an economist at George Mason University, estimated that number of freelancers had grown by one million. While in 2012, the Aberdeen Group, a private research company, estimated that 26% (approx. 81 million) of the United States population was a part of the contingent workforce, a category of casual labor that includes freelancing.

In 2013, the Freelancers Union estimated that 1 in 3 workers in the United States was self-employed (approximately 42 million), with more than four million (43%) of those self-employed workers as members of the creative class, a stratum of work specifically associated with freelance industries, such as knowledge workers, technologists, professional writers, artists, entertainers, and media workers.

In 2016, the Freelancers Union estimated that 35% of the workforce in the United States was self-employed (approximately 55 million). This workforce earned an estimated $1 trillion from freelancing in 2016—a significant share of the U.S. economy. In 2017, a study by MBO Partners estimated the total number of self-employed Americans aged 21 and above to be 40.9 million.

The total number of freelancers in UK is also inexact; however, figures from the Office for National Statistics show that the proportion of remote workers rose from 9.2% in 2001 to 10.7% in 2011. It has been estimated, however, that there are approximately 1.7 million freelancers in the UK.

Freelancing is a gendered form of work. The 2012 Freelance Industry Report estimated that more than 71% of freelancers are women between the ages of 30 and 50. Surveys of other specific areas of freelancing have similar trends. Demographic research on Amazon Mechanical Turk revealed that the majority of its North American workers are women. Catherine McKercher's research on journalism as a profession has showcased that while media organizations are still male-dominated, the reverse is true for freelance journalists and editors, whose ranks are mainly women.

== Benefits ==
Freelancers have a variety of reasons for freelancing, the perceived benefits differ by gender, industry, and lifestyle. For instance, the 2012 Freelance Industry Report reported that men and women freelance for different reasons. Female survey respondents indicated that they prefer the scheduling freedom and flexibility that freelancing offers, while male survey respondents indicated they freelance to follow or pursue personal passions. Freelancing also enables people to obtain higher levels of employment in isolated communities. The ability to pick and choose who the freelancer works with is another benefit. The freelancer interviews a potential client and they get to pick whether or not to work with that individual or company.

Freelancing is also taken up by workers who have been laid-off, who cannot find full-time employment, or for those industries such as journalism which are relying increasingly on contingent labor rather than full-time staff. Freelancers also consist of students trying to make ends meet during the semester. In interviews, and on blogs about freelancing, freelancers list choice and flexibility as a benefit.

== Drawbacks ==
Freelancing, like other forms of casual labor, can be precarious work. Websites, books, portals and organizations for freelancers often feature advice on getting and keeping a steady work stream. Beside the lack of job security, many freelancers also report the ongoing hassle of dealing with employers who don't pay on time and the possibility of long periods without work. Additionally, freelancers do not receive employment benefits such as a pension, sick leave, paid holidays, bonuses or health insurance, which can be a serious hardship for freelancers residing in countries such as the US without universal health care.

Freelancers often earn less than their employed counterparts, although sometimes the opposite is true. While most freelancers have at least ten years of experience prior to working independently, experienced freelancers do not always earn an income equal to that of full-time employment. Feedback from members suggests that web portals such as Freelancer.com tend to attract low-paying clients that, although demanding very high standards, pay ~$10 per hour or less. Low-cost suppliers frequently offer to work at rates as low as $1–$2 per hour. Because most projects require bidding, professionals will not bid because they refuse to work at such rates. This has the effect of reducing the overall quality of the services provided.

According to research conducted in 2005 by the Professional Writers Association of Canada on Canadian journalists and editors, there is a wage gap between staff and freelance journalists. While the typical Canadian full-time freelancer is female, between 35 and 55, holding a college diploma and often a graduate degree, she typically earns about $29,999 Canadian dollars before taxes. Meanwhile, a staff journalist of similar age and experience level working full-time at outlets such as the Ottawa Citizen or Montreal Gazette newspapers, earned at least $63,500 Canadian dollars that year, the top scale rate negotiated by the union, The Newspaper Guild-Communications Workers of America. Given the gendered stratification of journalism, with more women working as freelancers than men, this disparity in income can be interpreted as a form of gender pay gap. The Professional Writers Association of Canada report showed no significant difference between the earnings of male and female freelancers, though part-time freelancers generally earned less than full-time freelancers.

Remote work is often cited as an attractive feature of freelancing, yet research suggests that it introduces new sets of constraints for the process of doing work, particularly for married women with families, who continue to bear the brunt of household chores and childcare despite increases in their paid work time. For instance, three years of ethnographic research about teleworkers in Australia conducted by Melissa Gregg, a Principal Engineer and Researcher in Residence for the Intel Science and Technology Center for Social Computing at UC Irvine, raises concerns over how both physical isolation and continuous access enabled with networked digital media puts pressure on homeworkers to demonstrate their commitments through continual responses by email and to conceal their family or home life.

== Internet and online marketplaces ==
The Internet has opened up many freelance opportunities, expanded available markets, and has contributed to service sector growth in many economies. Offshore outsourcing, online outsourcing and crowdsourcing are heavily reliant on the Internet to provide economical access to remote workers, and frequently leverage technology to manage workflow to and from the employer. Much computer freelance work is being outsourced to developing countries outside the United States and Europe. International freelancers use their skills in English to enable greater pay and flexibility in their work.

Freelance marketplaces provide a marketplace for freelancers and buyers. Service providers or sellers create a profile where they include a description of the services they offer, examples of their work, and, in some cases, information about their rates. Buyers register and complete a basic profile, and then post projects outlining their requirements. Buyers will then bid for these projects on a fixed price or hourly basis. Many of these websites have user review sections that affect the reputation of freelancers who list there, and which may be manipulated.

Freelance marketplaces have globalized competition for some jobs, allowing workers in high- and low-income countries to compete with one another. According to a 2016 study by the McKinsey Global Institute, 15% of independent workers used online marketplaces to find work.

These marketplaces, including Fiverr and Lyft, have been criticized as exploiting workers.

== Legal aspects ==
Many periodicals and newspapers offer the option of ghost signing, when a freelance writer signs with an editor but their name is not listed on the byline of their article(s). This allows the writer to receive benefits while still being classified as a freelancer, and independent of any set organization. In some countries this can lead to taxation issues (e.g., so-called IR35 violations in the UK). Ghost signing has little bearing on whether a writer is a freelancer or employee in the US.

Freelancers often must handle contracts, legal issues, accounting, marketing, and other business functions by themselves. If they do choose to pay for professional services, they can sometimes turn into significant out-of-pocket expenses. Working hours can extend beyond the standard working day and working week.

The European Commission does not define "freelancers" in any legislative text. However, the European Commission defines a self-employed person as someone: "pursuing a gainful activity for their own account, under the conditions laid down by national law". In the exercise of such an activity, the personal element is of special importance and such exercise always involves a large measure of independence in the accomplishment of the professional activities. This definition comes from Directive (2010/41/EU) on the application of the principle of equal treatment between men and women engaged in an activity in a self-employed capacity.

The European Forum of Independent Professionals defines freelancers as: "a highly-skilled subset of self-employed workers, without employers nor employees, offering specialised services of an intellectual and knowledge-based nature". Independent professionals work on a flexible basis in a range of creative, managerial, scientific and technical occupations; they are not a homogeneous group and as such, they cannot be considered or investigated as a whole. They are generally characterised by a large portion of autonomy, a high labour productivity, knowledge intensive performance, social commitment and a large dose of entrepreneurship and specialisation.

In the U.S. in 2009, federal and state agencies began increasing their oversight of freelancers and other workers whom employers classify as independent contractors. The U.S. Government Accountability Office (GAO) recommended that the Secretary of Labor have its Wage and Hour Division "focus on misclassification of employees as independent contractors during targeted investigations." The increased regulation is meant to ensure workers are treated fairly and that companies are not misclassifying workers as independent contractors to avoid paying appropriate employment taxes and contributions to workers' compensation and unemployment compensation.

At the same time, this increased enforcement is affecting companies whose business models are based on using non-employee workers, as well as independent professionals who have chosen to work as independent contractors. For example, book publishing companies have traditionally outsourced certain tasks like indexing and proofreading to individuals working as independent contractors. Self-employed accountants and attorneys have traditionally hired out their services to accounting and law firms needing assistance. The U.S. Internal Revenue Service offers some guidance on what constitutes self-employment, but states have enacted stricter laws to address how independent contractors should be defined. For example, a Massachusetts law states that companies can hire independent contractors only to perform work that is "outside the usual course of business of the employer," meaning workers working on the company's core business must be classified as employees. According to this statute, a software engineering firm cannot outsource work to a software engineering consultant, without hiring the consultant as an employee. The firm could, however, hire an independent contractor working as an electrician, interior decorator, or painter. This raises questions about the common practice of consulting, because a company would typically hire a management consulting firm or self-employed consultant to address business-specific needs that are not "outside the usual course of business of the employer."

=== United States ===
In the United States, where the federal constitution automatically grants ownership of the copyright only to the author, the contract agreement must explicitly use the language, that the product is "work for hire", and that the copyright is transferred to the client. Otherwise, only the freelancer will own the right to reproduce the work. Registration of copyright is not required for ownership of these rights; however, litigation against infringement may require registration, as documented in the class action lawsuit, Reed Elsevier, Inc. v. Muchnick. In that case, freelance writers sued publishers for copyright violations, though the case was eventually settled for the benefit of freelance writers whether or not they had registered their copyright with the Copyright Office. Copyright is rescinded only when a freelancer signs a contract specifying that they are "working for hire," or if they are hired into employment. These rights are further specified in U.S. copyright law, Section 101 in the Copyright Act of 1976 (17 USC §101).

== Etymology ==
The term freelancer is commonly attributed to Sir Walter Scott (1771–1832) in Ivanhoe (1820) to describe a "medieval mercenary warrior" or "free-lance" (indicating that the lance is not sworn to any lord's services, not that the lance is available free of charge). It changed to a figurative noun around the 1860s and was recognized as a verb in 1903 by authorities in etymology such as the Oxford English Dictionary. Only in modern times has the term morphed from a noun (a freelance) into an adjective (a freelance journalist), a verb (a journalist who freelances) and an adverb (they worked freelance), as well as into the noun "freelancer".

== See also ==
- Career-oriented social networking market
- Employment website
- Freelancers Union
- Freelancing in India
- Mercenary
- Misclassification of employees as independent contractors
- Outline of consulting
- Recruitment advertising
- Self-employment
- Stringer (journalism)
- Temporary work
- Contingent work
