= Labour hire (Australia) =

Supplying employees to another workplace

In Australia, labour hire is referred to by the legal term of art labour hire arrangement, and it refers to the employment practice of an employer supplying its employees to another workplace, for profit.

Labour hire arrangements often overlap with, but are distinct from the practice of temporary staffing. Labour hire arrangements are situations in which an employee has a legal employer, but no direct employment contract with the place of work.

Companies that provide labour hire are often referred to as 'recruitment agencies' however, labour hire arrangements do not involve an agency relationship with an employee or the worksite in a legal sense. The labour hire company is paid for services provided to the worksite by the employee, they are not paid as an agent for the cost of recruitment per se.

The labour hire arrangement can be contrasted with other recruitment business dealings, that involve a finder's fee paid to an agency for helping a workplace obtain an employee.

== Labour hire industry ==
=== Labour hire firms ===
As of January 2020, the total revenue of the labour hire industry in Australia is approximately $29 billion; according to industrial analysts. The analyst firm IBISWorld claims that there are 9,634 labour hire businesses and 362,800 labour hire employees in the industry.

The largest companies in the Australian labour hire industry are Hays, Persol Holdings (which owns both Programmed & Skilled Group), Recruit (trading as RGF Staffing), WorkPac, ManpowerGroup, Adecco, and Randstad NV. Other notable labour hire firms include Ingeus (notable for being founded by Thérèse Rein, the wife of former Prime Minister Kevin Rudd), and Serco (notable for its labour hire procurement to government departments).

=== Industrial clients ===
Labour hire arrangements are used by many large companies in Australia in their workforce. A prominent example is the Amazon MEL1 facility, located in Dandenong South. It was reported by the Sydney Morning Herald that 100% of the non-managerial workforce at that facility is provided by Adecco. Reportedly, Amazon's other facilities in Australia are operated on similar terms.

Labour hire is also used in great quantity by the Commonwealth Government.

== Legal issues ==
=== Legal responsibility ===
As the de jure employer, labour hire providers are legally responsible for ensuring compliance with Australian Industrial law, including the Fair work act.

Labour hire employees must be offered wages & conditions in compliance with the applicable Industrial award.

=== Liability for injuries at client worksites ===
Labour hire companies have been found legally liable for the injuries of their employees, on the tort ground of Negligence. In the case Drake Industrial v WorkCover Authority the common law duty of care owed by employers toward their employees, was affirmed to include circumstances in which the employee works on a premises not controlled by the labour hire employer. The court noted that:

"An employer who sends its employees into another workplace over which they exercise limited control is ... under a particular positive obligation to ensure that those premises, or the work done, do not present a threat to the health, safety or welfare of those employees."

=== Enterprise bargaining agreements ===
Enterprise bargaining agreements (EBAs) applicable to a workplace do not legally cover labour hire employees and their employers, unless there is a clause written into the agreement expressing that to be the case. Instead, EBAs are formed between employees of the labour hire company, and the labour hire company itself. This can result in a pay difference between actual employees of a worksite, and those working there through labour hire; an aspect that has been criticized by the Australian Labor Party.

Labour hire companies have been accused of using spurious legal tactics to undermine EBAs existing between employees and their existing workplaces; on behalf of clients. In 2016, Carlton & United Breweries (CUB) attempted to abolish an in-force EBA with its workforce, by paying the company Programmed to become their legal employer. Programmed then attempted to force the workers onto an EBA that had been created years earlier, with different workers; with substantially lower wages. When some workers refused to sign-on to the new agreement, Programmed attempted to replace them with labour hire. CUB and Programmed's actions resulted in a consumer boycott and picketing campaign against the company that lasted six months. (see also: Carlton & United Breweries dispute)

== Regulation ==
De jure employers in a labour hire arrangement are subject to the industrial laws that generally bind all employers. This includes any applicable Industrial awards, as well as additional laws specifically regulating the conduct of labour hire businesses. In Victoria and Queensland, labour hire businesses must obtain a license to operate from the State government.

== Terminology ==
While labour hire is the term used in Australia and Namibia, the concept has varying terminology depending on jurisdiction. Practices analogous to labour hire in Australia have been referred to as Labor Contracting (USA), and Labour brokering (South Africa), among other names.

Likewise, labour hire providers are referred to by differing names depending on country. Some terms include Employment agency (UK), professional employer organization (USA), among others.

== See also ==
- Labour hire
- Employment agency
- Temporary work

=== By country ===
- Labour brokering (Southern Africa)
- Labour hire in Namibia
