= Labour hire in Namibia =

In Namibia, the issue of labour hire remains a controversy among the government, unions and labour brokering companies. The ILO categorizes two forms of subcontracting, namely job contracting (where a subcontractor supplies goods or services) and labour-only contracting (the sub-contractor supplies labour only). Most of Namibia's labour hire companies fall into the second category as they merely supply labour to their clients.

Historically it was reinforced by Pass Laws, with Indigenous people concentrated by the government in Bantustans not allowed outside those reserves unless they had signed fixed labor contracts with labor brokers.

The workers, known as contractors, field employees, temps, on-hired employees or even just employees, are employed by the labour hire organisation. They are not employed by the company to whom they provide labour. This is an important distinction for the purposes of Occupational Healthy and Safety (OH&S) purposes, in particular who has legislative responsibility for ensuring a safe working environment. This has been tested in court Labour hire when the Africa Labour Services (ALS) lodged an application with the court challenging the amendment of the Labour Act 11 of 2007 by the government that prohibited the hiring out and employing of casual workers in Namibia. According to the heads of argument of the applicants, the provisions of section 128 demands that the user enterprises, among others, to offer labour hire employees the same benefits as their own employees. The arguments a mostly centered between the high unemployment rate in Namibia and the worker's rights, where the government describe labour hire practice as a form of exploitation to the workers much more like during the colonial era.

== History ==
=== Apartheid era labour hire (contract labour system) ===
The labour contract system existed under the control of SWANLA, a semi-governmental agency. Any black or indigenous person who lived within the colonial reserves were not allowed outside the boundaries of these reserves unless they signed a 12-18 month fixed labour contract with SWANLA, which offered set wage-rates & conditions with no bargaining allowed. Worker were required to carry around passes with their movement strictly controlled & monitored. Women were barred from signing and as such not allowed outside the reserves.

Contract workers then would be leased out by SWANLA to other businesses. Any breaking of the contract, such as quitting or labour organizing, brought criminal sanctions alongside severe disciplinary punishments that could be exercised by the employer. Contract workers also lived in compounds controlled by their employers. As such, alongside the typically bad working conditions, it's been characterized by many as close to slavery.

For contract work under SWANLA, workers were classified into 4 separate grades of physical fitness, and to some extent job experience: Class A, B, C, and [Child]. (Note: The classification used a derogatory term for black children, Piccanin) Wages were monthly, with the minimum ranging from 3.75 (for a child) to 8.75 Rand (for Class A). For reference, at the time this was $5 to $10 USD.

Later following the end of the 1971-72 contract workers strike, SWANLA was dissolved and replaced with several non-governmental contractors. However the conditions and general structure of the contract system remained much the same.

=== Ban ===
According to one South African Journal, contract labour continued until it was banned in 1977 through the General Law Amendment Proclamation, AG 5 of 1977. This coincided with an escalation of the South African Border War from the new South African prime minister P. W. Botha by 1979.

=== Re-emergence ===
The banning of contract labour stayed until it reemerged in the 1990s inside Namibia, in the form of today's labour hire system. There have been attempts to re-abolish such as the Namibian Labour Act of 2007, but this was reversed by the courts system in December, 2009 before it could be implemented.

"[91] For these reasons, the prohibition of the economic activity defined by s. 128(1) in its current form is so substantially overbroad that it does not constitute a reasonable restriction on the exercise of the fundamental freedom to carry on any trade or business protected in Article 21(1)(j) of the Constitution and, on that basis alone, the section must be struck down as unconstitutional." (bolding added)

The court decision was only a few months after the act was to officially go into effect on March 1, 2009. However, in practice the law was never implemented as its legal power was suspended on February 27 till the court decision finished. Labour hire has since been partially regulated through the Labour Amendment Act 2 of 2012 which provides some minimal labour protections in the face of the 2007 law being removed.

== See also ==
- Employment agency
- Temporary work

=== By country ===
- Labour brokering (Southern Africa)
- Labour hire (Australia)
