= Contract labour system in Namibia =

The contract labour system in Namibia was a system where black migrant workers from the north went to work in white areas under a contract. Until 1971/1972, workers could not leave without a reasonable reason as it was a criminal offence to do so. Several other work acts were also barred by criminal law, such as attempting to avoid work, doing it carelessly or having a second place of employment. They lived in poor conditions and were poorly paid. Women could not participate in the contract labour system.

== History ==
Contract labour existed during German rule, although Owambo, the region from which these migrant laborers came, was then independent. There were between 6000 to 12000 Ovambo workers present in German South West Africa each year between 1910 and 1914. Ovambo men notably went into contract to pay the taxes imposed by Europeans and to buy European goods, and because they could no longer collect minerals from regions that were now under white control.

Contract labour continued under South African rule, specifically in the north of Namibia. The homelands were unproductive areas, and thus almost all African workers in Namibia were migrant workers under the contract system migrating to white areas to find work. Africans in the north were only allowed to leave the bantustans to be workers under this system until 1979.

Before 1971, all employers except farmers had to obtain a permit from a local official to participate in the contract system. They then had to send the permit alongside a requisition for labor to the South West African Native Labour Associations (SWANLA) (Note: Between 1926 and 1943, there were instead two other companies. SWAPO was created to give some protection to employees against unreasonable and unfair labor treatment.), a semi-governmental association responsible for the recruitment of contract labourers. Future workers were classified in four different grades (A, B, C, "piccanins") depending on their physical condition, and had different minimum wages depending on their category, ranging from 3,75 rands/month ("piccanins"; juveniles under 15) to 8,69 rands/month (category A). Women were barred from the contract labour system.

The contract system led to a major strike in 1971/1972. As a result of the strike, the contract system changed completely. SWANLA was abolished and replaced by employment bureaux run by tribal authority. Normal working hours were instituted, and excess work was regarded as overtime. Employees or employers could cease employment before the end of the contract, but with a certain notice beforehand. Workers no longer had to return home before reentering employment. Workers could take unpaid leave and were given paid leave at the end of the contract.

Further reforms were introduced in 1977, abolishing the contract labour system with the General Law Amendment Proclamation. Africans were given the freedom to search for work on their own in urban areas and granted them the right to have their families with them at their place of work. (Note: However in truth employers did not provide facilities for their families and thus workers still could not bring their family with them.) The Pass laws were abolished but replaced by another law in 1979. (Note: migrant workers now needed to carry an identity card)

== Life conditions ==
Workers waiting to be employed had to live on their own supplies, and if the latter ran out, had to walk long distances to get more supplies at their home. As for transportation, workers were brought to SWANLA's headquarter in Grootfontein and were then distributed to various regions by road or rail. Many workers were transported in train's cattle carts until 1972; by 1980 some were transported in the second and third class of passenger trains.

In mining and urban areas, contract labourers lived at compounds provided by their employers. Ten or fifteen black workers would be crammed into a room, whereas coloureds lived in compounds with four workers and whites workers lived with their family in fully furnished houses. Some were even more overcrowded. Blacks slept on thin matresses and blankets. Toilet facilities were also poorer than those offered to whites. This allowed employers to minimize costs.

Some employers did pay more than the minimum wage, but workers could not bargain for better wages. Employers also had to provide free food, accommodation and medical care. However, they were of poor quality, and some workers did not have access to the food because they lived far away from the workplace and could not arrive in time for the meals.

These poor life conditions led to poor health. Doctors were rarely or not available at all. Sick leave was unpaid, and could lead to dismissal.

Workers had no physical contact with their family during their time as contract laborers.

== Working conditions ==
Contracts usually lasted twelve to eighteen months, and could go up to thirty months. Once a worker entered a contract, he could not break it without a reasonable cause as it was a criminal offence to do so.

The normal work day in 1975 was ten to fifteen hours. Workers earned low wages; it was estimated in 1975 that black workers' income was of around 18 rands per month compared to 352 rands for white workers. Contract labourers were so cheap that they undercut other forms of black labour thus making black labor cheap in general (permanent residents and migrant workers from the central and southern reserves).

White collegues thought themselves as superior to the African workers and would treat them badly. Some white workers did nothing or even acted as if they were black workers' supervisors.

It was a criminal offence for African workers to attempt to avoid work, to do it carelessly, to be obscene with his employer or to have a second place of employment. After leaving their job or losing the permit to seek jobs, Africans had 72 hours to leave urban areas, (Note: And "proclaimed areas"; meaning, areas with a large presence of Africans for industrial purposes) with some exceptions. Africans could also be expelled if it was deemed that there were too many Africans in an urban area, if they begged, if they failed to provide for their dependents "due to [their] own misconduct" (Note: In the latter case, they could also be fined or imprisoned.) or simply if they left their designated areas for something other than work.

Workers had to carry passes or exemption certificates at all times, as failure to show one to authorities once asked was a punishable offence. This ensured that black workers would only stay in white areas as long as their labour was needed.

Workers were under harsh discipline. They had to listen to their employer's will by law, and were often ordered to take jobs in which they had no experience against their will.

Workers had to return to their bantustan once the contract finished and had to wait a month before reapplying for a contract labor job.

== See also ==
- Labour hire in Namibia
