= Marriage bar =

Ban on the employment of married women

A marriage bar is the practice of restricting the employment of married women. Common in English-speaking countries from the late 19th century to the 1970s, the practice often called for the termination of the employment of a woman on her marriage, especially in teaching and clerical occupations. Further, widowed women with children were still considered to be married at times, preventing them from being hired, as well.

The practice lacked an economic justification, and its rigid application was often disruptive to workplaces. Marriage bars were widely relaxed in wartime due to an increase in the demand for labor. Research carried out by Claudia Goldin to explore their determinants using firm-level data from 1931 and 1940, find out that they are associated with promotion from within, tenure-based salaries, and other modern personnel practices.

Since the 1960s, the practice has widely been regarded as employment inequality and sexual discrimination, and has been either discontinued or outlawed by anti-discrimination laws. In the Netherlands, the marriage bar was removed in 1957, in Australia it was removed in 1966, and in Ireland it was removed in 1973.

== Variations ==
While "marriage bar" is the general term used to encompass all discriminatory hiring practices against married women, two variations were commonplace for employers in the 1900s. The "hire bar" is the classification of the prevention of hiring married women. The "retain bar" is the prevention of retaining married workers. Both terms fall under the larger umbrella term.

To avoid seemingly discriminatory practices, many employers utilized marriage bars to classify married women as supplementary staff, rather than permanent. This was the case, for example, at Lloyds Bank until 1949, when the bank abolished its marriage bar. Classifying women as supplementary, rather than full-time staff, allowed employers to avoid paying women fixed salaries and to terminate women's employment more easily.

== History ==
=== Australia ===
The ban on married women in the Australian Public Service was implemented under the Public Service Act 1902. In 1958, The Boyer Report, initiated by Sir Robert Menzies, and headed by Sir Richard Boyer, recommended that the ban be lifted. The ban was not lifted, however, until 18 November 1966, after Harold Holt became prime minister.

=== Ireland ===
The Civil Service (Employment of Married Women) Act became law in Ireland on 31 July 1973. This legislation ended the marriage bar which had prevented married women from working in the civil service. The marriage bar in the wider public sector ended the following year.

=== United Kingdom ===
In Great Britain and Northern Ireland, the marriage bar applied to teachers in publicly-funded schools and the staff of the BBC and was removed by the Education Act 1944. The BBC had a marriage bar between 1932 and 1944, although it was a partial ban and was not fully enforced, due to the BBC's ambivalent views on the policy. Lloyds Bank used a marriage bar to classify married women as supplementary staff rather than permanent until 1949, when the bank abolished its marriage bar.

Several other areas of work in the UK had a marriage bar until the 1970s, for example the British Geological Survey until 1975. The marriage bar prohibited married women from joining the civil service. It was abolished in 1946 for the Home Civil Service and in 1973 for the Foreign Service; until then women were required to resign when they married. Having a marriage bar was made illegal throughout the UK by the Sex Discrimination Act 1975.

=== United States ===
The practice of marriage bars arose in the United States in the late 1800s. Marriage bars were often seen in the teaching and clerical industries. While many women hid their marital status in efforts to keep their jobs, marriage bars were not banned by law until 1964 when Title VII of the Civil Rights Act of 1964 prohibited discrimination in employment on the basis of race, color, sex, or ethnic origin.

While common throughout the United States, the marriage bar was relaxed in certain geographical areas and time periods. Contrary to urban areas, rural areas often needed teachers so they were willing to hire married women. Marriage bars were less strict during World War I because women were needed in the assistance of war efforts. At the beginning of World War II, 87% of school boards would not hire married women and 70% would not retain a single woman who married. But in 1951, only 18% of the school boards had the "hire bar" and 10% had the "retain bar".

Marriage bars generally affected educated, middle-class married women, particularly native-born white women. Their occupations were that of teaching and clerical work. Lower class women and women of color who took jobs in manufacturing, waitressing, and domestic servants were often unaffected by marriage bars. Discrimination against married female teachers in the US was not terminated until 1964 with the passing of the Civil Rights Act.

== Justification ==
A 1946 article in The Spectator, a British conservative magazine, offered a few reasons for the justification of marriage bars. The article said that women who were married were supported by their husbands, and therefore did not need jobs. Furthermore, marriage bars provided more opportunity for those whom proponents viewed as "actually" needing employment, such as single women. The Spectator also argued that unmarried women were more reliable and mobile than married women, as they did not have children or other pressing responsibilities.

Marriage bars were connected to social and economic fluctuations, as well, especially after the end of World War I. Returning servicemen who wanted jobs, and afterwards the Depression in the 1930s, led to the implementation of marriage bars in many professions. However, marriage bars were often justified on tradition, especially in places where there was a very strong tradition of married women as housekeepers and child-carers.

== Similar practices ==
While not directly related to the marriage bar, certain de facto discriminatory hiring practices raised similar concerns for women as the marriage bar did in the earlier 1900s. For example, certain discriminatory practices against pregnant women led to the US Pregnancy Discrimination Act of 1978.

== See also ==
- Feminisation of the workplace
- Women in the workforce

== Further information ==
- Celebration of the 40th anniversary of the lifting of the Marriage Bar - transcript of a speech by Lynelle Briggs in 2006, regarding the marriage bar in the Australian Public Service
