= Robina Stadium =

Stadium in Robina, Queensland, Australia

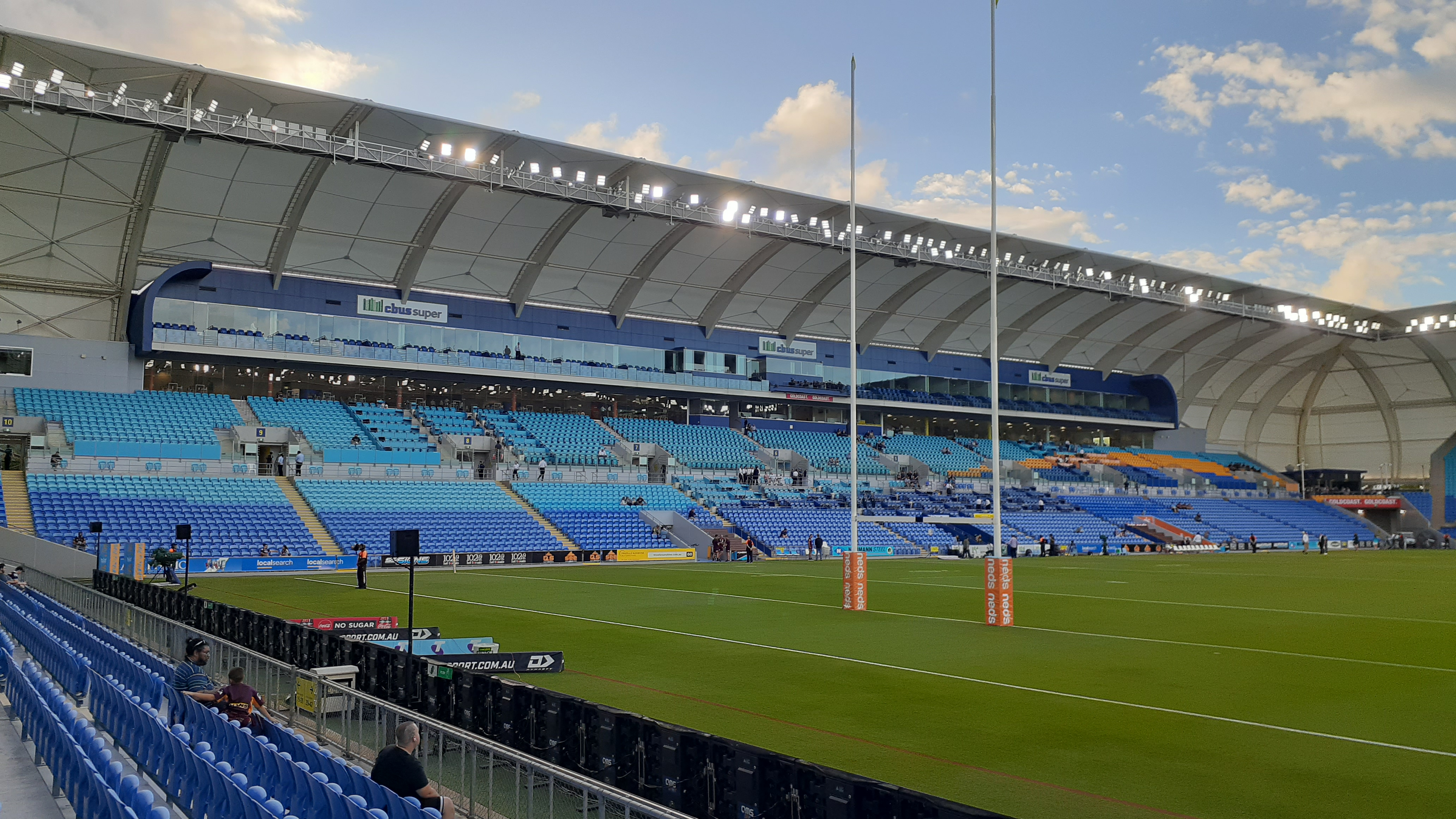
- Stadiums Queensland Rating
- Interactive map of Robina Stadium
- Former names: Skilled Park (2006-2014); Gold Coast Stadium
- Location: Robina, Queensland
- Coordinates: 28°4′1″S 153°22′44″E
- Owner: Queensland Government
- Operator: Stadiums Queensland
- Capacity: 27,690
- Record attendance: 27,227 – Titans vs Brisbane, 2009
- Public transit: Robina

Construction
- Groundbreaking: 2006; 20 years ago
- Opened: February 2008; 18 years ago
- Cost: A$160 million
- Architect: HOK Sport

Tenants
- Gold Coast Titans (NRL) (2008–present); Queensland Country (NRC) (2014); Gold Coast United (A-League) (2009–2012); Gold Coast Sevens (Rugby Sevens) (2011–2014); 2018 Commonwealth Games (Rugby Sevens) (2018); Brisbane Roar (A-League) (2015–2020); Queensland Maroons (State of Origin) (2021); Palm Beach Sharks/Gold Coast City FC (FFA Cup) (2014–2015)

Robina Stadium (known under naming rights as Cbus Super Stadium) is a stadium located in the Gold Coast suburb of Robina. It is primarily used for rugby league as the home ground of the Gold Coast Titans in the National Rugby League (NRL).

The stadium was opened in 2008 to be the Gold Coast’s primary rectangular sporting venue, with the Gold Coast Titans joining the National Rugby League the year prior. The stadium boasts a capacity of 27,690.

The stadium hosted rugby sevens at the 2018 Commonwealth Games, and is set to host preliminaries for football at the 2032 Summer Olympics. It also hosted games during the 2008 and 2026 Rugby League World Cups, alongside game three of the 2021 State of Origin series.

== Stadium ==
Robina Stadium is located in the satellite growth suburb of Robina, next to Robina railway station. The stadium is effectively a smaller version of Suncorp Stadium in Brisbane, and was designed by the same company. The project was funded by the Queensland Government. On 27 September 2006, it was announced that the new ground would be renamed Skilled Park after Skilled Group won the naming rights to the stadium. The land for the site was purchased by the Gold Coast City Council and gifted to the Queensland Government to build the Stadium.

Sports Minister Judy Spence announced that the new stadium will now be able to seat 27,400 people instead of 25,000. This came after workers on the site found extra space for about 2,400 seats across the stadium while construction was in progress.

Robina Stadium hosted two matches in the 2008 Rugby League World Cup, which was held in Australia. The first saw eventual tournament champions New Zealand defeat Papua New Guinea 48–6. The second, a semi-final qualifier, saw a Jarryd Hayne-led Fiji defeat Ireland 30–14. The ground also became host to the newly created A-League side, Gold Coast United, starting in 2009–10.

The ground first saw finals football when the Titans, in their first finals appearance, hosted the Brisbane Broncos in the first week of the 2009 NRL season play-offs. This ground also witnessed finals when the Gold Coast Titans defeated the New Zealand Warriors 28–16 in the 2010 finals.

Beginning in November 2011, the stadium hosted the Gold Coast Sevens, the first event in the annual IRB Sevens World Series of rugby sevens. The country's leg of the series had previously been staged in Adelaide in early autumn (March/April) at the Adelaide Oval, but was put up for bidding upon the expiry of Adelaide's hosting contract.

In Round 4 of the 2014 NRL season, a 3-foot brown snake invaded the stadium, now known as Cbus Super Stadium, during a match between the Titans and Queensland rivals the North Queensland Cowboys. No one was injured, with the snake remaining in the southeast corner until midway through the game.

In 2015, the venue hosted the United Arab Emirates Football team as they prepared for the Asian Cup and it also hosted three Brisbane Roar Asian Champions League fixtures in February, March and May.

The Stadium hosted Game 3 of the 2021 State of Origin series, originally scheduled to be played at Stadium Australia in Sydney. But due to a COVID-19 outbreak in Sydney at the time, The Game was moved to McDonald Jones Stadium in Newcastle before being moved a second time to Robina Stadium.

American rock band Kiss performed at the stadium during their End of the Road World Tour on 10 September 2022.

Monster Jam made its debut at the stadium on 21 October 2023 for 2 shows.

In September 2024, the stadium will hosted a 2026 FIFA World Cup Qualifier, with Australia hosting Bahrain in front of 24,664. In December 2024, the Matildas played a friendly against Brazil in front of 25,297.

== NRL records ==
- Highest Team Score:

- 66 – Gold Coast Titans vs New Zealand Warriors 22 June 2024
- 56 – Manly-Warringah Sea Eagles vs Gold Coast Titans, 20 June 2021
- 54 – Brisbane Broncos vs Gold Coast Titans, 5 August 2017
- 48 – Melbourne Storm vs Newcastle Knights, 17 July 2021
- 46 – Parramatta Eels vs Gold Coast Titans, 22 March 2020

- Largest Winning Margin:

- 60 pts – Gold Coast Titans (66) def. New Zealand Warriors (6), 22 June 2024
- 54 pts – Brisbane Broncos (54) def. Gold Coast Titans (0), 5 August 2017
- 44 pts – Melbourne Storm (48) def. Newcastle Knights (4), 17 July 2021
- 44 pts – Gold Coast Titans (44) def. New Zealand Warriors (0), 5 September 2021
- 40 pts – Parramatta Eels (46) def. Gold Coast Titans (6), 22 March 2020

- Lowest Team Score:

- 0 pts – New Zealand Warriors vs Gold Coast Titans, 5 September 2021
- 0 pts – Gold Coast Titans vs Brisbane Broncos, 5 August 2017
- 0 pts – Canberra Raiders vs. Gold Coast Titans, 17 March 2013
- 0 pts – Melbourne Storm vs. Gold Coast Titans, 9 June 2008
- 0 pts – Gold Coast Titans vs. Melbourne Storm, 1 May 2016
- 4 pts – Gold Coast Titans vs. South Sydney Rabbitohs, 27 July 2013

- Most Tries in a Game:

- 4 – Alofiana Khan-Pereira, Gold Coast Titans vs New Zealand Warriors, 22 June 2024
- 4 – Reuben Garrick, Manly-Warringah Sea Eagles vs Gold Coast Titans, 20 June 2021
- 4 – Dylan Walker, South Sydney Rabbitohs Vs Gold Coast Titans, 10 May 2014
- 4 – Jordan Atkins, Gold Coast Titans vs. North Queensland Cowboys, 14 March 2008
- 3 – Ryan Papenhuyzen, Melbourne Storm vs Cronulla-Sutherland Sharks, 3 September 2021

- Most Points in a Game:

- 28 (4.6.0) – Reuben Garrick, Manly-Warringah Sea Eagles vs Gold Coast Titans, 20 June 2021
- 26 (1.11.0) – Jayden Campbell Gold Coast Titans vs New Zealand Warriors, 22 June 2024
- 22 (2.7.0) – Pat Richards, Wests Tigers vs Gold Coast Titans, 16 March 2014
- 22 (1.9.0) – Mitchell Moses, Parramatta Eels vs Gold Coast Titans, 22 March 2020
- 20 (2.6.0) – Shaun Johnson, New Zealand Warriors vs Gold Coast Titans, 20 June 2015

- Most Tries Scored:

- 36 – David Mead (Gold Coast Titans/Brisbane Broncos)
- 35 – Anthony Don (Gold Coast Titans)
- 30 – Kevin Gordon (Gold Coast Titans)
- 21 – William Zillman (Gold Coast Titans)
- 16 – Ryan James (Gold Coast Titans/Canberra Raiders/Canterbury-Bankstown Bulldogs)

- Most Points Scored:

- 377 (11.166.1) – Scott Prince (Gold Coast Titans/Brisbane Broncos)
- 192 (7.80.4) – Aidan Sezer (Gold Coast Titans/Canberra Raiders)
- 158 (10.58.2) – Ashley Taylor (Gold Coast Titans)
- 144 (36.0.0) – David Mead (Gold Coast Titans/Brisbane Broncos)
- 142 (35.1.0) – Anthony Don (Gold Coast Titans)

== Crowd records ==
The stadium produced a record attendance of 27,176 on 18 April 2008 when it hosted the Heritage Round National Rugby League match between Gold Coast Titans and Brisbane Broncos. This figure was surpassed by a crowd of 27,227 on 12 September in a match against the same team in the 3rd qualifying final of the NRL Finals Series 2009.

=== Sports events ===
Date	Sport	Description	Event	Attendance	Reference
12 September 2009	Rugby league	Gold Coast Titans vs Brisbane Broncos	2009 NRL season	27,227	
18 April 2008	Rugby league	Gold Coast Titans vs Brisbane Broncos	2008 NRL season	27,176	
10 September 2010	Rugby league	Gold Coast Titans vs New Zealand Warriors	2010 NRL season	27,026	
14 March 2008	Rugby league	Gold Coast Titans vs North Queensland Cowboys	2008 NRL season	26,974	
1 September 2018	Rugby league	Gold Coast Titans vs North Queensland Cowboys	2018 NRL season	26,681	

== Rugby league test matches ==
List of rugby league test and World Cup matches played at Robina Stadium since its opening in 2008.

Test#	Date	Result			Attendance	Tournament
1	1 November 2008	New Zealand	48–6	Papua New Guinea	10,780	2008 World Cup
2	10 November 2008	Fiji	30–14	Ireland	8,224	2008 World Cup
3	6 May 2011	Australia	20–10	New Zealand	26,301	2011 Anzac Test
4	2 May 2015	Fiji	22–10	Papua New Guinea	12,336	2015 Pacific Internationals
5	2 May 2015	Samoa	18–16	Tonga	12,336	2015 Pacific Internationals
6	31 October 2026	Fiji	54–6	France	10,966	2026 Women's World Cup
7	31 October 2026	New Zealand	78–0	Fiji	23,659	2026 Men's World Cup
8	31 October 2026	New Zealand	40–12	Papua New Guinea	23,659	2026 Women's World Cup

== Rugby union test matches ==
Test#	Date	Result			Attendance
1	15 September 2012	Australia	23–19	Argentina	22,278
2	13 September 2014	Australia	32–25	Argentina	14,281
3	15 September 2018	Australia	19–23	Argentina	16,019
4	12 September 2021	New Zealand	39–0	Argentina	15,191
5	12 September 2021	Australia	28–26	South Africa	15,191

== See also ==
- Sports on the Gold Coast, Queensland
- Carrara Stadium – Used as the primary home venue of the Titans in 2007.
