= Labour brokering =

Recruitment practice

Labour brokering is a South African term for a form outsourcing practiced (In Namibia, known as labour hire) in which companies contract labour brokers to provide them with casual labour.

Labour brokers are different from recruitment agencies in that labour brokers handle almost all aspects of the worker's employment (including interviews, recruitment, HR, admin, payroll, transport, etc.), whereas recruitment agencies are only responsible for sourcing candidates for employment. In essence, rather than a company hiring a worker, it hires a labour broker who hires the worker in its stead. In other jurisdictions, labour brokering is referred to as Labour hire, Permatemp, or Employment agency.

The current statutory definition of a labour broker under South African law, as of 1 March 2009, is "any natural person who conducts or carries on any business whereby such person for reward provides a client of such business with other persons to render a service or perform work for such client, or procures such other persons for the client, for which services or work such other persons are remunerated by such person".

== Opposition to labour broking ==
In 2008, Namibia passed a law banning the practice of "labour hire", the Namibian term for labour brokering. The Congress of South African Trade Unions (COSATU), South Africa's largest trade union federation, has called for the abolition of labour brokering in South Africa. COSATU argues that labour brokers are responsible for the increasing casualisation of labour in South Africa. Currently about 30% of the South African workforce is casualised. As casual workers receive much lower salaries than permanent employees, and as they have much lower job security, COSATU argues that labour brokering, contrary to the claims of its supporters, does not create meaningful employment and that it, in fact, violates the rights of workers.

COSATU called for a national one day general strike against labour brokering and the proposed Gauteng e-toll system for 7 March 2012. On that day, the trade union federation mobilised tens of thousands of people, mostly workers, against labour brokering. Nonetheless, the ruling African National Congress (ANC) dug in its heels; with Minister of Labour Affairs Mildred Oliphant stating that labour brokering "is here to stay".

== See also ==
- Labour hire
- Pass laws
- Bantustan

=== By country ===
- Labour hire (Australia)
- Labour hire in Namibia
