= Skilled Group =

- Type: Subsidiary
- Industry: Human Resources, Labour hire
- Founded: 1964
- Headquarters: Melbourne, Victoria
- Key people: Bruce Brook (Non-executive chairman); Chris Sutherland (Managing Director)
- Revenue: A$1,873,893 (2013)
- Owner: Persol Holdings
- Number of employees: Approximately 50.000 full- and part-time employees
- Parent: Programmed Maintenance
- Website: skilled.com.au

Skilled Group is an Australian company headquartered in Melbourne, Victoria. Its core business is labour hire. It is a subsidiary of Programmed Maintenance, which is itself a subsidiary of Japanese labour hire conglomerate Persol Holdings.

The company manages offices across multiple countries; including Australia, New Zealand, United Kingdom, Malta and the United Arab Emirates.

== Corporate history ==
The company was founded in 1964 by Frank Hargrave AO.

In October 2015, Programmed Maintenance (ASX:PRG) acquired Skilled Group.

In October 2017, Programmed Maintenance was acquired by Persol Holdings.

== Legal controversies ==
In 2011, Telstra trainees took the company and its subsidiary Excelior to the industrial relations tribunal. The union said that trainees were not compensated enough for expenses during mandatory training.

In 2015 in a landmark case, a couple was awarded damages of $720,000 against the company after being refused jobs for being non-union.

== See also ==
- Labour brokering
- Recruitment
- Temporary work
