= Yoshiko Shinohara =

Japanese businesswoman

- 篠原欣子
- Born: 19 October 1934 (age 91)
- Known for: Founder and chairman emeritus, Persol Holdings (formerly Temp Holdings)

Yoshiko Shinohara (Japanese: 篠原欣子, Hepburn: Shinohara Yoshiko) is a Japanese businesswoman and philanthropist. Shinohara founded Persol Holdings (formerly Tempstaff) in 1973, leading the company until she retired while taking on the role of chairman emeritus in 2016. In 2017, she became the first woman in Japan to become a self-made billionaire.

== Early life and education ==
Shinohara was born in 1934, to a school headmaster and a midwife. She had a tough upbringing growing up during World War II and her father died when she was only 8. She attended public schools, eventually graduating from Yokohama Eiri Girls High School in 1953. She got married shortly after finishing high school when she was 20 but left her husband shortly thereafter realizing "she would rather not be married." She never remarried and has no children.

== Career ==
In 1973, Shinohara founded Tempstaff from a one-bedroom apartment after returning to Japan after living abroad in Europe and Australia where she saw women working as temps. She was 38 and had recently divorced her husband. At the time, it was unusual for Japanese women to do paid work let alone start a company and, initially, her company was in violation of the law which did not allow for temporary employment. The company was initially staffed entirely by women but began hiring men in 1988. As of 2009, the company was staffed 60% by women and 40% by men.

Shinohara retired from her role as chairman of the company in 2016 while retaining the title of chairman emeritus. As of 2020, she had an 11% stake in Persol Holdings. In early 2023, she became Japan's first self-made woman billionaire as shares in her company boomed. Forbes estimated her net worth at $965 million in 2023.

She has described her management approach as "start small, grow it large” explaining that "women have the knack of steadily building a businesses as well as being able to give form to ideas that are close at hand."

== Awards ==
She has been ranked as one of the world's strongest women executives by Forbes, a top women in world business by the Financial Times, as one of the most powerful women in business by Fortune for nine consecutive years, and as one of the "Stars of Asia Entrepreneurs" by BusinessWeek. She is Japan's only self-made billionaire.

== Philanthropy and advocacy ==
In 2016, she donated $140 million of stock to endow the Yoshiko Shinohara Memorial Foundation which would fund scholarships for students studying to become nurses, social worker or day-care staff. Her decision to retire from Persol Holdings to focus on philanthropy has been cited as an example of women being more likely to donate than men of equal means.

She is an advocate for government policies that encourage more women to enter the workforce.
