= 1971–72 Namibian contract workers strike =

Namibian general strike

1971–1972 Namibian Contract Strike
- Part of the Namibian War of Independence and the Internal resistance to apartheid
- Date: 13 December 1971 - March 1972
- Location: Namibia
- Goals: To end the contract labour system Better working/living conditions
- Result: End of SWANLA contract labour New contract labour system established

Parties
Contract workers & Indigenous peoples; SWAPO	South Africa; Jan de Wet; Portuguese troops; Corporations: American Metal Climax; Newmont Mining

Number
+25,000 workers	

Casualties and losses
At least eight deaths	

The 1971–72 Namibian contract workers general strike was a labour dispute in Namibia, which at the time was under the administration of the South African government. The dispute was between Namibian contract workers (particularly miners) and South Africa's then white-minority government. Workers sought to end the contract-labour system, which many described as close to slavery or serfdom. An underlying goal was the promotion of independence under SWAPO leadership.

The strike began on 13 December 1971 in Windhoek and on the 14th in Walvis Bay before spreading to the US-owned Tsumeb Mine and beyond. Approximately 25,000 workers participated in the strike, primarily those from Ovamboland in the country's densely populated north. The strike continued into the next year, ending in March 1972.

== Background ==
=== Historical ===
During this period, Namibia existed under apartheid as a subjugated colonial state of South Africa and was referred to as South West Africa. Apartheid began in the Union of South Africa in 1948 and was extended to its mandate territory of South West Africa. By the mid-1960s, about 45 to 50 percent of the Black labour force was contract migrant labour from the reserves north of the Red Line.

The contract system was controlled by SWANLA, a quasi-governmental agency. Any Black or Indigenous person who lived in the colonial reserves was not allowed outside the reserves unless they signed a 12-to-18-month labour contract with SWANLA, which offered set wages and conditions with no bargaining. Workers were required to carry passes, and their movement was strictly controlled and monitored. Women were barred from signing contracts, and were not allowed outside the reserves.

Contract workers would be leased out by SWANLA to businesses. Any breach of the contract, such as quitting or labour organisation, brought criminal sanctions and severe punishment which could be exercised by the employer. Contract workers lived in compounds which were controlled by their employers through SWANLA. With the system's typically-bad working conditions, it has been characterised by many as akin to slavery or serfdom.

For contract work under SWANLA, workers were classified into one of four classes of physical fitness and (to some extent) job experience: Classes A, B, C, and [Child]. (Note: The SWANLA classification used a derogatory term for Black children, Piccanin.) Wages were paid monthly, with the minimum ranging from R3.75 (for a child) to R8.75 for Class A; this was equivalent to US$5 to $10.

The decades of apartheid before the strike saw significant labour-organisation efforts and a number of strikes; this included the development of OPO. The Windhoek or Old Location massacre occurred in 1959, which contributed to the evolution of SWAPO from OPO. This played a major role in the fight against apartheid in Namibia, and a limited role in this strike.

=== Immediate ===
In August 1971, pro-independence students (many of whom already had experience with contract work) were expelled from high schools throughout Ovamboland by South African officials. Many former students then took contract work to promote a general strike. They cooperated with local workers and SWAPO branches to establish contact with others and kick-start the campaign.

Previous organising had already established substantial autonomy in the big compounds. Tactics used to subvert pass laws also allowed significant mobilisation in the compounds. Police responded with mass raids, where all workers were searched systematically and many arrests were made.

In March and June, Katutura, Windhoek was raided by police and a checkpoint was established at its only entrance; workers were forced to show valid passes, disrupting pass evasion. In June, the International Court of Justice had ruled that South Africa's ongoing occupation of Namibia was illegal; this encouraged anti-colonial actions in the territory. On the night of November 11, workers destroyed the checkpoint and offices. Police responded with another large raid four days later.

By early November, labour organisation became more overt. Organisers at Walvis Bay called a mass meeting, which was attended by most of the compound's contract workers. A deadline was set for the start of the strike, with letters and information sent to other compounds. It was decided that mass meetings would be held on Sunday, December 12, at Walvis Bay and Windhoek, and the strike would begin the following week. The information reached Windhoek on December 5.

Under the pass system, workers planned to return to the Ovamboland reserve for the duration of the strike. This was partially in response to earlier statements by Jan de Wet, Commissioner General for Ovamboland, when the government became aware of a potential strike. According to de Wet, contract labour was not slavery since workers signed the contracts. In reality, economic conditions in the reserves and the pass system often forced workers to sign contracts as a means of survival. Special taxation of those in the reserves by the South African government worsened this, some said by design. In a November 28 letter, after the earlier mass meeting, workers at Windhoek responded:

... He said we ourselves want to be on contract because we come to work. We must talk about ending the system. We in Walvis Bay discussed it. We wrote a letter to the government of Ovamboland and to SWANLA. We will not come back. We will leave Walvis Bay and the contract, and will stay at home as the Boer J. de Wet said.

After the earlier November meeting, police arrested 14 organisers at Walvis Bay. The meeting also revealed some of the leadership and the timing of the strike to the South African government, which probably played a role in the muted success of the strike in Walvis Bay compared to Windhoek.

On December 12, during the planned mass meeting at Walvis Bay (which was also held at Windhoek) the South African government led an anti-strike meeting with pro-government speakers and Bantustan officials. This backfired due to militant worker response, with the Evangelical Lutheran Church in the Republic of Namibia (ELOK)'s Bishop Leonard Auala persuaded to endorse the strike.

== Strike ==
The strike began on December 13 in Windhoek and the following day in Walvis Bay, both large worker compounds. In Windhoek, workers refused food prepared in the compound kitchens on the first day of the strike and left the compound to buy food at local shops. Police sealed off the compound on the following day, December 14, locking workers inside. The Walvis Bay compound was also sealed off preemptively by police that day, the first day of its strike.

By December 20, 11,500 workers had struck. Eighteen thousand workers had returned to Ovamboland by mid-January, 13,500 of whom were transported by rail by the government, which wanted to avoid conflict at compounds in centers of production and near white residences.

A total of 25,000 workers were involved in the strike – 22,500 from towns, mines and camps, and over half of the 43,400 contract workers in the Police Zone. The Police Zone was an area in South West Africa (present-day Namibia) where Indigenous people were not allowed to enter unless they had a labour contract. The zone was established in 1905, when South West Africa was a German colony, as a result of the 1897 rinderpest epizootic. Rinderpest caused massive cattle die-offs, an estimated 95 percent of cattle in southern and central Namibia. A veterinary cordon, known as the Red Line, was established during the epizootic.

The policing of borders became necessary to prevent disease from spreading to healthy cattle, exposing the fragility of a German colonial control defined by the Red Line. A 1905 resolution to establish the Police Zone was passed in Berlin, saying that the new zone "should be restricted to the smallest possible area ... [focusing] where our economic interests tend to coalesce". The Police Zone boundary was broadly defined by the earlier veterinary cordon fence.

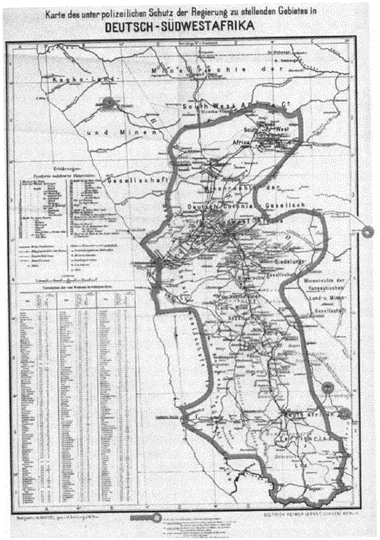
1907 Police Zone map, outlined in grey

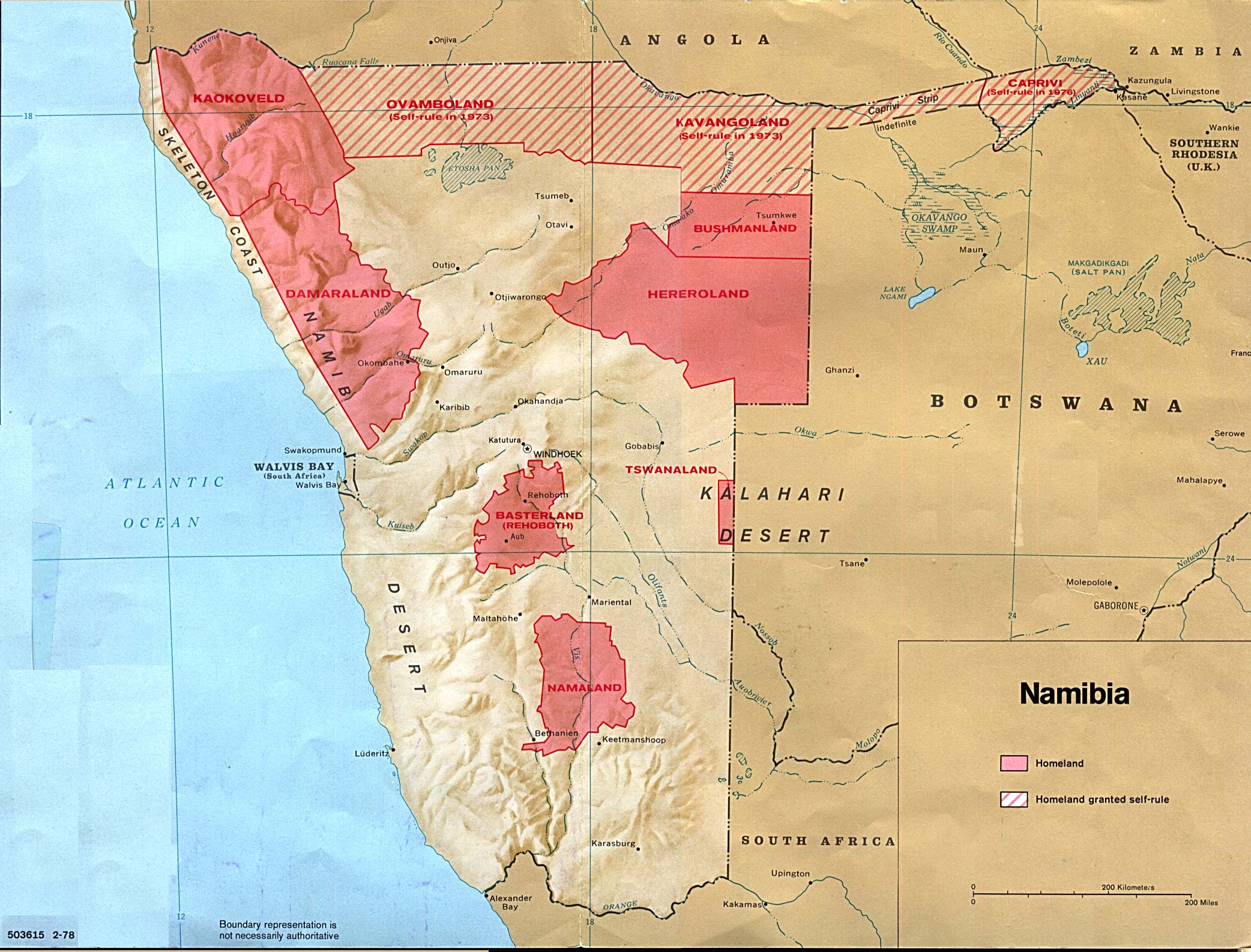
Police Zone (in tan) and Indigenous reserves (in red) in 1978

This became a significant policed boundary between white German colonizers and the Indigenous population in Namibia, laying the foundation for racial apartheid in the 1940s. In addition to strikers in the Police Zone, over 70 percent of those employed outside the zone also joined the strike. The South African government inadvertently fueled the strike, criticizing on government-controlled radio workers who had left for the Ovamboland reserve; workers outside the compounds heard the news, and many joined a strike of which they had been unaware.

During the strike, an ad hoc committee was formed by workers in Ovamboland with its members elected on a regional basis. The committee met on 3 January, and decided to reject any agreement not supported by the strikers; it also drew up lists of specific grievances and demands, and held a mass meeting a week later. At the meeting, a delegation was elected to represent the workers in negotiations with the government, major employers and the Bantustan executive on January 19–20 in Grootfontein.

While the strike continued, picket lines were maintained at the borders; this turned back potential strikebreakers. The strike goals broadened to include the grievances of workers and the Indigenous peoples in the reserves. A more-general resistance against apartheid and colonialism sparked more active confrontations. During this, the government briefly blocked roads north of Ondangwa.

During the night of January 16, over 100 km of border fences were destroyed by those with grievances against the apartheid government; over the following weeks, a series of attacks were made on stock-control posts, inspectors, headmen and informants on both sides of the borders. The most radical resistance was in Ulwanyama, along the border.

An agreement was reached on January 20, 1972, which abolished the South West Africa Native Labour Association (SWANLA), required written employment contracts with details of entitlements and conditions, removed criminal sanctions (adding civil sanctions against workers deemed to have breached employment contracts) and established mechanisms to resolve disputes. In practical terms, however, little changed for contract workers. Some workers returned after the agreement, but many continued to strike. Severe police repression and attacks also persisted against workers who attempted to meet.

=== Ondobe and Epinga massacres ===
On January 28, 1972, three men were killed by police in Ondobe. Two days later, five workers were shot and killed by police in the village of Epinga. A mass grave containing the five contract workers, buried miles away, became known to the broader public in 2008. Although, locals had been aware of it for years. Four of the workers (Thomas Mueshihange, Benjamin Herman, Lukas Veiko and Mathias Ohainenga) died in Epinga. Three others were injured, and another (Ngesea Sinana) later died in the hospital.

=== End of the strike ===
21 March 1972
- "The Ovambo Issue": Official AP News archive

By late February, the strike had been partially broken. Wide-scale opposition continued, however, eventually merging into a long-term guerilla campaign in the north as part of the Namibian War of Independence. Many workers continued to hold out, with some (but not all) returning months later; some accounts cite March 1972, and SWAPO member John Ya-Otto cites May 1972.

== Aftermath ==
According to a South African law journal, contract labour continued until it was banned with the General Law Amendment Proclamation, AG 5 of 1977. This coincided with the escalation of the South African Border War by the new South African prime minister P. W. Botha in 1979.

Contract labour reemerged during the 1990s in Namibia with the labour hire system. Attempts to re-abolish it included the 2007 Namibian Labour Act, which was reversed by the Supreme Court in December 2009 before it could be implemented:

"[91] For these reasons, the prohibition of the economic activity defined by s. 128(1) in its current form is so substantially overbroad that it does not constitute a reasonable restriction on the exercise of the fundamental freedom to carry on any trade or business protected in Article 21(1)(j) of the Constitution and, on that basis alone, the section must be struck down as unconstitutional."

The Supreme Court ruling was made only a few months after the act was scheduled to go into effect on March 1, 2009; the law was never implemented, however, since it was suspended on February 27 until the court decision was made. Labour hire has since been partially regulated through the Labour Amendment Act 2 of 2012 which provides some labour protections after the 2007 law was struck down.

== See also ==
- Apartheid in Namibia
- 1973 Durban strikes
- Labour hire in Namibia
- South African Border War § Political unrest in Ovamboland
