= Denham v Midland Employers' Mutual Assurance Ltd =

Denham v Midland Employers’ Mutual Assurance Ltd
- Citation: [1955] 2 QB 437

Denham v Midland Employers’ Mutual Assurance Ltd [1955] 2 QB 437 is an English contract law case, concerning multiple employers.

== Facts ==
A company hired Denham to work on its land and provided him with an unskilled labourer assistant. The man was killed on the job, due to the negligence of Denham's co-workers. The dead man was at all times paid by the company, and the company alone had the power to dismiss him. The question was whether Denham's insurer or the insurer of the company should pay damages to the deceased man's widow.

== Judgment ==
Denning LJ held that a contract of service cannot be transferred from one employer to another without the servant's consent, and it must be real consent.

The court reasoned that "These results are achieved in law by holding that Clegg became for the time being the temporary servant for Le Grands. There is no harm in thus describing him so long as it is remembered that it is a device designed to cast liability on the temporary employer. The real basis of the liability is, however, simply this: if a temporary employer has the right to control the manner in which a labourer does his work, so as to be able to tell him the right way or the wrong way to do it, then he should be responsible when he does it in the wrong way as well as in the right way. The right of control carries with it the burden of responsibility."
