= Witwatersrand Native Labour Association =

The Witwatersrand Native Labour Association (WNLA), more popularly Wenela, was set up by the gold mines in South Africa as a recruiting agency for migrant workers.

Eventually, it comprised a large organisation with its own depots, buses and aeroplanes spread over the whole of Southern Africa: South Africa, Basutoland, Swaziland, South West Africa, Bechuanaland, Northern Rhodesia, Southern Rhodesia, Nyasaland, Angola, Mozambique, extending into the Belgian Congo and Tanganyika.

Each depot had administrative and medical staff and a "barracks" to house recruits both before departure and on their return. Some had clinics and even schools, where the recruits were taught Fanagalo, the lingua franca of Southern Africa (fifteen hours of tuition was enough to be useful) and then the rudiments of mining.

Tours were usually six months, but many men spent their entire working lives as migrant workers.

This author is writing of the North West then part of Northern Rhodesia: "The Witwatersrand Native Labour Association (WNLA) recruited systematically in the 1940s and 1950s, using permanent local agents, a system of barges which penetrated all of the major rivers of the region, and out-stations where workers were housed until they could be brought into the Boma for transportation. At the Boma WNLA maintained its own gardens and cattle herds as well as substantial hostels.

In Northern Rhodesia, the government had a hut tax of quite a small amount, payable annually for each hut. It was a form of "tribal initiation" for every young man to go down to the mines for at least one tour to bring back enough money to pay the hut tax for the entire village.

== See also ==
- South West African Native Labour Association

== Sources ==
- Prothero, R. Mansell (1974). "Foreign Migrant Labour for South Africa". The International Migration Review. 8 (3): 383–394. doi:10.2307/3002372. JSTOR 3002372.
- http://www.queensu.ca/samp/Treaties/Wenela.htm
- http://www.sarpn.org.za/documents/d0001831/Migrant_labour_Kanyenze_March2004.pdf
- De w Becker, J. C. (1974). "Wenela-past and present". Proc Mine Med off Assoc. 53 (418): 67–9. PMID 4620369.
