= Permatemp =

Permatemp is a United States term for a temporary employee who works for an extended period for a single staffing client. The word is a portmanteau of the words permanent and temporary.

It can also describe a semi-permanent structure or structural repair.

There are two types of permatemp employment relationships. In the first form, a public or private employer hires employees as "temporary" or "seasonal" employees, but retains them, often full-time for year after year, often with less pay and without any benefits. These employees often do the same work as permanent employees, but without the same pay, benefits, and labor rights. The second kind of permatemp is an employee of a staffing service provider, payroll agency or Professional Employer Organization, which sends workers to work in a long-term, on-site position for a private company or public employer. The employee is paid by the staffing service provider or agency rather than by the primary employer.

In the United States, these agencies are required by the US Internal Revenue Service (IRS) to pay the employer portion of Social Security and Medicare taxes (FICA) and Federal Unemployment Tax (FUTA) in accordance with IRS Publication 15A. U.S. leasing organizations are also required to provide employees with health coverage by the United States Department of Labor, the requirements of the health care offered will change in 2014 to comply with the Affordable Care Act (ObamaCare). Long-term full-time leased employees in the U.S. may also be offered a retirement benefit package with a minimum (leasing) company contribution of at least 10%, IRS Form7003.

== Definition ==
Traditionally, a temporary employee is hired to substitute for an employee who is on leave or vacation or to staff a project for which there are insufficient permanent employees to carry out the task. A seasonal employee is hired for the limited time because the work is necessary only for a certain part or season of the year. The normal practice of temporary employment for an agency is one in which the employees have a close relationship with the agency from which they receive their pay. Their work may range from day labor to high-priced consulting. The employee may work for one or several companies, and the working periods may be for days or months at a time, but the working periods often come about irregularly.

"Permatemps" are often distinguished from temporary employees by working for the same company for a long, possibly indefinite amount of time, working the same schedules and hours of regular employees, and by requirements such as "company" training or required attendance at "company" meetings. This is where many Leasing Agencies in the U.S. run afoul of the IRS and US Department of Labor. The IRS, in an effort to close loop holes which allow companies to hire temporary employees and thus avoid federal employee taxes have created a very clear definition of a "Common Law Employee" versus a "permatemp". The IRS definition of a common law employee rests on who actually controls the work done by the leased employee. IRS Publication 15A explains "Under Common Law Rules anyone who performs services for you is generally your employee if you have the right to control what will be done and how it will be done...What matters is you have the right to control the details of how the services are performed". IRS 15A also defines the role of staffing services with "The staffing service has the right to control and direct the worker's services for the client, including the right to discharge or reassign the worker. The Staffing Service hires the workers, provides them with unemployment insurance and other benefits, and is the employer for employment tax purposes." Further clarification for U.S. employees can be found in IRS Publication 15A Section 2. Misclassification of employees can lead to severe tax liabilities (IRS PUB 15 Circular E) and civil penalties as in the case of Vizcaino v Microsoft. Furthermore, if a "permatemp" actually qualifies as a common law employee, they are entitled to the same fringe benefits their co-workers receive either after one year or after the qualification standard set for regular employees, IRS Publication 15B. IRS Publication 7003 goes so far as to say "An individual who is actually a common law employee of the recipient (the worksite company) will not become an employee of another entity merely because the recipient enters into a formal "leasing agreement' with another entity."

Regular, permanent employees work for a single employer and are paid directly by that employer. In addition to their wages, they may receive benefits, such as subsidized health care, paid vacations, holidays, sick time, or contributions to a retirement plan. Regular employees are sometimes eligible to switch job positions within their companies. Even when employment is "at will," regular employees of large outfits are sometimes protected from abrupt job termination by severance policies, like advance notice in case of layoffs, or formal discipline procedures. They may be eligible to join a union, and may enjoy both social and financial benefits of their employment.

In order to pay the employee, the staffing firm is paid by the worksite company at an agreed upon bill rate, which can be many percentage points higher than the pay rate.

== Legal issues in the United States ==
Arguments have been made that when a worker is actually employed full-time, year round, but called a temporary or seasonal employee, the employee is being exploited by being denied the wages, benefits, and employment rights enjoyed by other employees. While it is unknown how common this kind of situation is, class action lawsuits have been decided against Seattle, Washington and King County, Washington. These public sector cases generally involve violation of ordinances or rules limiting the length of service of such workers.

Two California cases address the issues of public employees who were improperly considered "temporary" when they were actually employed as regular, permanent employees. The first case involves the Los Angeles County Fire Department; the second such case concerns the employment practices of the Metropolitan Water District of Southern California. These cases are both class action lawsuits that have been litigated over a number of years. Both cases are near, or in the process of, being settled.

In an Albuquerque, New Mexico, case a federal district judge ruled that an employee who worked full-time for the City of Albuquerque for more than ten years as a "seasonal" supervisor and recreation leader (never earning more than $7.00 per hour and with no benefits) might have had a "property interest" in his employment such that he could not be terminated without a hearing. The judge also certified a conditional class of "similarly situated" city employees employed as temporary or seasonal employees in violation of City ordinances, which limited temporary employees to two years and limited seasonal employees to nine months or less each year.

Staffing through temporary agencies became common in the Silicon Valley technology companies. Permatemping came into vogue simultaneously with the economic bubble of the 1990s. Most recently, General Motors and its subsidiary, Delphi, announced plans to rely on temporary employees. Whether these will be long-term temps, or permatemps, remains to be seen.

General Motors has used "permatemps" for a long time in its lowest management level, Level 6 Supervisor, under a national contract with Kelly Services.

One legal issue and one tax issue, both having to do with permatemps at Microsoft, defined permatemping and also changed it.

=== Vizcaino v. Microsoft ===
In 1996, a class action lawsuit was brought against Microsoft representing thousands of current and former employees that had been classified as temporary and freelance. The monetary value of the suit was determined by how much the misclassified employees could have made if they had been correctly classified and been able to participate in Microsoft's employee stock purchase plan. The case was decided on the basis that the temporary employees had had their jobs defined by Microsoft, worked alongside regular employees doing the same work, and worked for long terms (years, in many cases).

The Microsoft case centered on the language found in Microsoft's Employee Stock Purchase Plan (ESPP). In that plan, Microsoft defined plan participants (those eligible to participate in the plan) as all "common law employees" on the company's payroll. The only employees specifically excluded under the language of the ESPP were employees who worked less than five months per year or less than half-time. In reference to the independent contractors, the court held that because Microsoft conceded they were common-law employees and not independent contractors, Microsoft had no legitimate basis for rejecting their benefit claims. With regard to the individuals provided by temporary staffing agencies, the court used the following five factor test in determining whether they were truly "common law employees" and therefore eligible to participate in the plan:

- Recruitment
- Training
- Duration of employment
- Right to assign additional work
- Control over the relationship between worker and agency

Employees are not entitled to benefits unless they are "eligible" employees under a plan, regardless of whether they meet the common-law test for "employee" status. In other words, a plan need not adopt or incorporate the common law definition of an employee in delineating the scope of its coverage. Employers are free to draft employee benefit plans that leave out certain groups of workers. For example, a plan can exclude contingent workers or workers hired through a third party agency. It can also exclude workers who do not elect to participate in the plan.

The case and subsequent appeals were heard in the United States Court of Appeals for the Ninth Circuit. Before a final ruling could be issued, Microsoft settled the case for US$97 million. The Microsoft permatemps collected their money almost 10 years later.

=== IRS tax rulings ===
Simultaneous with Vizcaino, the United States Internal Revenue Service issued a ruling that Microsoft owed millions of dollars in payroll taxes. The IRS determined that permatemp employees were common law employees of Microsoft and the staffing firm's role was simply that of payroll processor.

== Legal changes ==
As a result of the legal and tax rulings, human resources organizations at many companies changed their policies towards temporary employees. Microsoft, for example, decreed that an individual could not be a temp for more than 364 days, and that individuals must be separated from Microsoft for more than 100 days between temporary assignments with the company. Other companies have created policies stating that temporary workers can be assigned to only specific projects that last just a few months. Individuals are often prohibited from taking back-to-back assignments within an agency client company.

When a company requires a break in service of its permatemps, the result is often that those employees regularly cycle between two companies instead of having back-to-back assignments. Other permatemps plan for personal breaks and simply use the time as vacation. In most cases, they are eligible for unemployment insurance as long as they nominally look for work. This form of permatemping may be attractive to those not wanting a steady, full-time, or year-round position, or not wanting to be committed to one position or one employer.

Another arrangement to avoid long-term serial temporary assignments is to "in-source" the work to be done, and not the position that does the work. In this arrangement, a company does not hire a staffing firm to fill a position, but rather hires it to do the work. The staffing firm still must hire the permatemp to do the work, still on-site at the corporation.

Some of these alternative arrangements barely differ from the pre-Vizcaino format for permatemping. Laws and legal rulings continue to define the permatemp-employee relationship. The IRS continues to warn many companies they may owe employment taxes for their temporary workers and employee lawsuits over temping repeat the same arguments.

Due to the 365-day rule, high value contractors (typically in IT) who choose to accept the risk of not receiving benefits and of contract termination in exchange for higher hourly rates are forced out of standard business relationships. This causes problems for both the contractor, who must continually move to new companies, and for the company, which must retrain and familiarize a new contractor with business rules and infrastructure.

== Culture ==
In Microsoft's corporate culture, the presence of permatemps created a caste-like system.

Many corporations hire temporary employees to do work they deem low-skilled or unimportant. Permatemps hired to do that work may not get the resources that a regular employee would. Permatemps might be forced to share office space, cubicles or phones when regular employees have their own. Employee badges for permatemps might be a different color, and permatemps may be recognized in the corporate e-mail system by dashes or other identifiers appended to their login ID. By declaring positions filled by permatemps to be low-skilled and making it easier for regular employees to identify their co-workers who are permatemps, companies create a sense of elitism in their regular employees. Permatemps, as a group, might be known by epithets such as "dash trash" (referring to an identifier and a dash prepended to an email user account) and Microsoft employees were referred to as "Blue Badges".

Frequently permatemps are highly skilled, excellent workers, particularly in the IT field, but are still not allowed to participate in company events or receive bonuses for work well done. If they earn over the United States Department of Labor minimum for overtime exemption, they may be asked to put in similar overtime hours to benefitted, salaried employees without overtime compensation. Depending on the staffing firm and corporation policies, permatemps may discover themselves in one of several positions, all of which require the same level of work from them as from their coworkers:

- Working for an inclusive corporation that allows permatemps limited rewards for good work, with a staffing firm that provides some benefits. If a staffing firm offers benefits they are occasionally immediate, but more typically the employee must wait several months to a year before becoming eligible. Some staffing firms have their own rewards programs for things like good contractor evaluations and length of employment.
- Working for an inclusive company through a staffing firm that offers no benefits. For example, a corporation might make up for a lack of holiday pay by paying for the day despite the employee's not working. This would eliminate common situations where permatemps received reduced pay due to forced time-off (such as company-wide closings on New Year's Day or Christmas holidays).
- Working for a non-inclusive company that offers no benefits at all to permatemps, with a benefit-offering staffing firm.
- Working for a non-inclusive company with a staffing firm with no benefits. Staffing firms are competitive, and long-term contracts vary between companies. While some do offer tangible benefits such as partial coverage of insurance premiums and personal time, others only offer pseudo-benefits. For example, a contracting company might advertise insurance as a benefit for its contractors, when all they offer is the opportunity for the permatemp to pay full price for insurance through them. Many corporations have contracts with staffing firms that don't allow them to switch a permatemp from one firm to another, so once a permatemp is brought in through a staffing firm, they must stay with that firm for the duration of the job, short of the corporation hiring them permanently. Unfortunately, a permatemp may discover themselves accepting a job that has no benefits out of economic necessity, or because their field has limited-to-no permanent openings in their location.

== See also ==
- Employment agency
- Independent contractor
- Independent contractor-employee distinction
- Labour hire
- Temporary work
- Contract attorney
