= Programmed Maintenance =

Labour hire and recruitment company

Programmed Maintenance Services Limited
- Type: Subsidiary
- Industry: Labour hire, Human Resources
- Founded: 1951
- Founder: Norman Miles
- Headquarters: Melbourne, Victoria
- Number of employees: Approximately 20,000
- Parent: Persol Holdings
- Website: programmed.com.au

Programmed Maintenance Services Limited, also known as Programmed, is a Japanese-owned Australian labour hire and recruitment company, specialising in blue-collar services. It is headquartered in Melbourne, Australia. Programmed is a wholly owned subsidiary of Persol Holdings, a human resource conglomerate headquartered in Tokyo.

== Corporate history ==
Programmed Maintenance Services originated as a business named 'Miles Paint Service' in 1951. It was founded as an Australian company, headquartered in Melbourne.

In 1999, Programmed was listed on the Australian Securities Exchange (ASX) under the ticker (PRG). In 2007 Programmed acquired WA based labour hire firm Integrated Group. A substantial component of the new business's back office was in Perth so Head Office was transferred to Perth post acquisition.

In 2015, Programmed acquired Skilled Group, for $650M. The acquisition resulted in financial troubles for the company.

Programmed was acquired by Persol Holdings (Japan's largest labour hire corporation), in 2017 for $778M. Following this acquisition, Programmed was delisted from the ASX.

== Controversies ==
=== Carlton & United Breweries dispute ===
In 2016, a major industrial dispute arose at Carlton & United Breweries' (CUB) Abbotsford plant, after workers at the facility were told that their de jure employer would become a subsidiary of Programmed. This resulted in a strike after it was proposed that applicable enterprise bargaining agreement at the workplace would have a significantly lower rate than previously; with a wage only 50 cents above the applicable Industrial award.

The controversy heightened when it was realized that the agreement had been established in 2014, by a subsidiary of Programmed named Catalyst Services; and was voted upon by just three casual workers at the time.

Most of the workers at the facility refused to sign onto their new employment contracts under those conditions, and began a picketing campaign that lasted 6 months. In December 2016, an agreement was reached between the Electrical Trades Union of Australia and CUB resolving the dispute.

== Sponsorships ==
In 2009, Programmed became a major sponsor of Fremantle Football Club, being featured on the teams Away Guernseys.
