= South West African Native Labour Association =

Employment organisation in South West Africa

The South West African Native Labour Association (SWANLA) was a labour contracting organisation which contracted primarily Ovambo people from Ovamboland in northern Namibia to work in the diamond mines in Namibia's southern ǁKaras Region.

It was established in 1943 from the merger of two pre-existing organisations, the Southern Labour Organisation (SLO) and Northern Labour Organisation (NLO).

It was infamous for its use of contract labour and human rights abuses among those employed in the mines. It was established in 1943 during World War II to accommodate a rising demand for labour. SWANLA was a driving force in the creation of opposition political movements, including the future liberation movement and ruling party of Namibia, the South West Africa People's Organization (SWAPO).

SWANLA classified employees based on 'working abilities & health' and then were issued tags to carry, around either their neck or arms. Worker had to show these tags to be allowed outside of Ovamboland. As no Ovambo or Kavango peoples were allowed to leave Ovamboland unless they were on a labour contract.

The organisation was abolished in 1972 after the 1971-72 Namibian contract workers strike against the contract labour system.

== See also ==
- Witwatersrand Native Labour Association
- Labour hire in Namibia
