= Persol Holdings =

Japanese human resource management company

- Company type: Conglomerate
- Industry: Labour hire, Human Resources
- Founder: Yoshiko Shinohara
- Headquarters: Japan
- Revenue: 970.57bn jpy (2020)
- Net income: 7.61bn jpy (2020)
- Total equity: 351.27bn jpy (2020)
- Number of employees: ~45,180 (2020)
- Subsidiaries: Programmed Maintenance, Skilled Group
- Website: https://www.persol-group.co.jp/en/

Persol Holdings (rebranded from Temp Holdings) is a Japanese human resource management company, that provides labour hire services to clients.

== Corporate history ==
The company was founded as 'Temp Holdings' in 1973 by Yoshiko Shinohara in her apartment. At the time, temporary staffing was an illegal form of employment in Japan, and Yoshiko was concerned that her company's illegal activities would cause her to be imprisoned. The temporary staffing industry was eventually legalised and regulated in Japan through the 1985 Worker Dispatch Law.

Until 1988, the management of Temp holdings was exclusively female.

As of 2016, the company collects revenues of US$4.5 billion.

It is one of Japan's largest staffing companies, with 32,000 employees and a market cap of $5.7B as of 2017.

In October 2017, it acquired the Australian labour hire company Programmed Maintenance for $778M.
