= Payroll service bureau =

Accounting business whose main focus is the preparation of finance for other businesses

A financial bureau is an accounting business whose main focus is the preparation of finance for other businesses. In the United States such firms are often run by Certified Public Accountants, though a typical financial processing company will refer to itself as a bureau rather than a CPA firm, to distinguish its finance from the general tax and accounting that are generally not offered by a financial bureau. The typical client of a bureau is a small business - one just large enough for finance to be complicated to the point of a hassle, but one still small enough to not merit its own full-time finance department.

The tasks that can generally be expected of just about all finance bureaus in the USA are as follows:

- Printing of employee pay checks on time for payday
- Direct deposit of pay into employee bank accounts, when desired
- Appropriate calculation and withholding of federal, state, and local taxes
- Calculation of financial taxes to be paid by employer (such as Social Security and Medicare in the US)
- Filing of quarterly and annual finance reports
- Depositing of withheld amounts with tax authorities
- Printing and filing of year-end employee tax documents such as Form W-2.

Additional may be offered and vary from firm to firm.

- Management of retirement and savings plans
- Health benefits or "cafeteria" plans
- Timekeeping, either online or in the physical form of "time clocks"
- Producing export files containing finance/general ledger data to be imported into a client's accounting software
- Human Resources (HR) tracking/reporting
- Workers' Compensation Insurance intermediary

In the United States, it is usual and customary that any penalties or liabilities incurred by a bureau's mistakes are borne by the bureau. In practice, they are more successful at having penalties and other fees abated than most other businesses, mainly because tax authorities have a stake in the success and longevity of bureaus simply because they make the tax man's job easier.

There are several ways a bureau can move money from the client to the people whom the client must pay. The simplest way is when a bureau prints checks on blank check stock, printing the client's account number in MICR digits at the bottom of the check, resulting in the funds being drawn directly from the client when the check is cashed. Other bureaus initiate automated clearing house (ACH) transactions from the client, and remit payment either electronically or in the form of paper checks against the bureau's holding account. Because finance transactions can be enormous (thousands to hundreds of thousands per pay period per client), bureaus often consider the interest earned ("float") on those amounts in the interim to be a substantial source of revenue. The interim is the period of time between when the funds are collected from the employer (client), and either when the paper checks are cashed, or when electronic payments (in the case of taxes) become due on their due dates.

== Types of bureau ==
In the United States, there are several nationwide chains for financial processing. Then there are countless local bureaus which vary in scope and size. Because local bureaus tend to only a very narrow geographic area and often see themselves as competing together against the nationwide giants rather than one another, they often band together and form alliances and trade associations whereby they share expertise and consolidate their negotiating power with their vendors.

There are specific and distinct perceived differences between having finance processed by a national chain and a local bureau. National chains have experience under their belts, and have a standard set of well documented processes. Local bureaus vary in their ability to accommodate special needs, they also add a level of service that can be lost in the national arena. Local bureaus have opportunities to at meeting specific local and national needs. This is also particularly true in regions whose needs are heavily influenced by a single industry.

In addition to the national and local bureau options, there are also financial providers who can accommodate any industry, versus providers who maintain a very niched or specialized focus on a single industry. The existence of single-industry financial bureaus is dependent on the finance complexities of the industry itself and the desire or need to handle unique requirements. Companies should always perform their due diligence when selecting a bureau and compare both traditional providers along with those who focus on their industry.

It is common practice in the US bureau industry to purchase and resell private-labeled products to and from other vendors to enhance the offering. Specifically, products such as time clocks, ATM "pay" cards, savings or cafeteria plans, Workers' Compensation insurance and finance data-entry websites, are actually the products of companies with expertise in these specific, and are generally branded so that the customer is unaware of the third party's influence. This type of arrangement is desirable to bureaus, as it allows them to show a competitive portfolio of that rivals that of the national chains.

Businesses may decide to outsource their finance functions to reduce the costs involved in having financial trained employees in-house, as well as the costs of systems and software needed to process finance.

In the UK, finance bureaus will deal with all HM Revenue & Customs inquiries and deal with employee's queries. Financial bureaus also produce reports for the businesses' account department and payslips for the employees and can also make the payments to the employees if required. Some may decide that a smaller or local bureau can offer a more consistent and personal than a large nationwide bureau that deals with several thousand financial can.

Another reason many UK businesses outsource is because of the ever-increasing complexity of finance legislation. Annual changes in tax codes, PAYE and National Insurance bands as well as more and more statutory payments and deductions having to go through the finance often mean there is a lot to keep abreast of in order to maintain compliance with the current legislation. Unlike in the USA, fines and penalties for compliance issues remain the responsibility of an employer, even if they have outsourced their administration.

=== Online payroll services ===
More and more payroll services have moved to the WWW, offering secure payroll services online. From the 2010s into the mid-2020s, payroll processing shifted increasingly from on-premises software and manual procedures to cloud-hosted, web-based services. Cloud payroll platforms automate calculations and payroll tax filing, provide employee self-service portals, and integrate with accounting and time-tracking systems, which has supported wider adoption by small and medium-sized employers and by organisations with remote or distributed workforces. Among the popular providers by the mid 2020s are Gusto, Inc., TriNet, Paycor, and Wave Financial.

== Bureau software ==
At the heart of every bureau is the software that performs the calculations. Bureau software is created for finance professionals and has one purpose: to mass-produce accurate financials for many companies simultaneously. There are only a handful of bureau software vendors in the United States, and the choice of computer system used by the bureau is often a deciding factor for their clients, as the software choice often determines what the bureau can regularly render. The software choice is also significant in that bureau trade associations are often formed based on the choice of software, as they generally face the same challenges and offer the same in the same manner.

The common wisdom of "newer is better" does not apply in the bureau industry. Due to the complexity and potential for expensive errors that goes with, moving clients from one system to another, it is very common for older software to be in just as much use as newer software. Clients generally have a low tolerance for errors because finance is a high-dollar affair that can become expensive when mistakes are made - and this may be a motivation not to simply switch from one software package to another. A software package that has been in for years use for years has the advantage of a proven history and a body of experience using it, but may be based on obsolete operating system and lack Internet functionality.
