= Labour hire =

Form of employment

Labour hire is a form of employment in which an employer directs their de jure employees ("labour hire employees", or "agency workers") to perform work at an external workplace, belonging to a client of the legal employer.

A labour-hire agency employs workers who are then "on-hired" to perform labour for a second party organisation. The Labour hire agency is responsible for payment and other employee entitlements. The second party organisation directs the worker tasks.

Labour hire is distinct from the more general practices of temporary staffing, or outsourcing; as those concepts aren't predicated on an employee not having a legal contract of employment with their workplace. It is also distinct from the concept of Independent contracting; as a contract of employment exists.

== Labour hire industry ==
Labour hire is often used by employers who want to engage staff temporarily, or have seasonal or other temporal factors reducing the need for direct administrative relationships with employees. Industries that commonly use labour hire include construction, landscaping, mining, event management, fruit picking, cleaning, civil (i.e. traffic control, labourers), and security. The hiring of workers from Labour hire companies provides businesses with extreme flexibility in sourcing labour, and they can alter their workforce rapidly with minimal legal constraints, as the legal employment relationship resides with another employer (i.e. a "no-strings-attached" style).

Hays

Recruit

ManpowerGroup

Adecco

Major labour hire company logos

Public information on the size of the international labour hire industry is not available. Additionally, many of the major players in the labour hire industry such as Hays do not separately account for fees generated through labour hire, from other recruitment fees within their annual reports. However, annual reports disclosed by the labour hire industry indicate that industry revenue is in excess of hundreds of billions of dollars.

Major players in the international labour hire industry include Hays, Persol Holdings, Recruit, ManpowerGroup, Adecco, Randstad NV, and Serco.

== Regulatory approaches ==
The regulatory approach to labour hire varies greatly by jurisdiction. In the European Union, the Temporary Agency Work Directive 2008 guarantees that all people working through employment agencies must have equal pay and conditions with employees in the same business, performing the same work. In the United Kingdom, a parallel law was enacted to implement that directive. Labour hire is similarly regulated in South Africa and Namibia.

In Australia, Labour hire is not specifically regulated at the federal level, although a number of licensing regimes exist to regulate the conduct of labour hire firms across the States and territories.

In Japan, contract workers must be paid same allowances as salaried staff but need not be given same pensions and bonuses.

== Terminology ==
The concept has varying English language names, depending on jurisdiction. While referred to as "labour hire" in Australia and Namibia, it is referred to as labor contracting or permatemping in the United States, and as Labour brokering in South Africa. Labour hire employees are often referred to as 'agency workers' in the UK and the European Union.

The term for labour hire provider also varies. Alternative terms include Employment agency (UK), professional employer organization (USA), among others.

== See also ==
- Employment agency
- Temporary work

=== By country ===
- Labour hire (Australia)
- Labour brokering (Southern Africa)
- Labour hire in Namibia
- Permatemp (U.S.)
