= Pass law =

Apartheid legislation

In South Africa under apartheid, and South West Africa (now Namibia), pass laws served as an internal passport system designed to racially segregate the population, restrict movement of individuals, and allocate low-wage migrant labor. Also known as the natives' law, these laws severely restricted the movements of Black South Africans, Indian South Africans and Cape Coloureds by confining them to designated areas. Initially applied to Black men, attempts to enforce pass laws on women between the 1910s and 1950s sparked significant protests. Pass laws remained a key aspect of the country's apartheid system until their effective termination in 1986. The pass document used to enforce these laws was derogatorily referred to as the dompas (Afrikaans for 'stupid pass').

== Early history ==
The first internal passports in South Africa were introduced on 27 June 1797 by the Earl Macartney in an attempt to prevent Black people from entering the Dutch Cape Colony. The Cape Colony was merged with the two Afrikaner republics in Southern Africa to form the Union of South Africa in 1910. By this time, versions of pass laws existed elsewhere. A major boost for their utilization was the rise of the mining sector from the 1880s: pass laws provided a convenient means of controlling workers' mobility and enforcing contracts.

In 1896 the South African Republic brought in two pass laws which required Black people to carry a metal badge. Only those employed by a master were permitted to remain on the Rand. Those entering a "labour district" needed a special pass which entitled them to remain for three days.

== Summary ==
Pass laws date "back to 1760 in the Cape when slaves moving between urban and rural areas were required to carry passes authorizing their travel". The pass laws, "had entitled police at any time to demand that [Native] Africans show them a properly endorsed document or face arrest", hindering their freedom of movement. This meant that it restricted where they could live, which in turn then "tied them to their white employers, underpinning a system of cheap labor and humiliating subjection". Their implementation over time arose from two contradictory needs. The white population in South Africa utilised these laws as "an 'exclusionary' need to obtain political security by controlling and policing the number of [Native] Africans in 'white' areas, and an 'inclusionary' need to ensure a supply of cheap labor within these areas". The legislation and practices associated with the pass laws have changed over time.

As these demands and beliefs changed, so did the rights of the black population in South Africa. When the pass laws were implemented at the turn of the century, they "encouraged the flow of labor into 'white' agriculture and industry and to redistribute labour into geographical areas where it was needed". This process would last until the 1950s, when the government opted to change the paradigm. This meant, "from 1950 onward the emphasis of the pass laws has been overtly exclusionary and directed to 'relocating' [Indigenous] Africans from 'white' areas and containing them within the Bantustans". Therefore, there has always been a tension between the white and black community in South Africa. This stemmed from the “efforts to use the pass system to balance white needs for security and labor”, while also creating laws that would allow for the control of "[Native] African employment, housing, access to land, and citizenship". Due to these laws, "over 17,745,000 [Indigenous] Africans have been arrested or prosecuted” between 1916 and 1984". The policing of Indigenous Africans allowed the whites to maintain dominance over the black population for the greater part of the 20th century.

Not only did the focus on how to control change over time, but also whom to control. Initially and "historically the use of passes in South Africa as a form of labour control applied only to men". This happened because "whenever attempts were made to extend the system to black women, mass protests quickly resulted". The vociferous opposition to the pass laws are of no surprise, considering the "fact that black women in South Africa have traditionally taken a more active role in mass popular protest", in comparison to men. The biggest manifestation was a phenomenon that occurred "during the 1950s when black women throughout the nation fiercely resisted official efforts to make them carry passes for the first time". The history of the application of pass laws towards women was intertwined with the belief that it would benefit the black female population. The “municipal authorities argued that passes for women were necessary to combat illegal brewing and prostitution”. They hypothesised that if a woman could prove that they made an honest living with legal employment then they would not be allowed to resort to illegal activities since they would be evicted. This proved to be a futile system since it was easier for the women in illegal practices to get around the laws than the home-based workers.

As the years passed by, pass laws would be used less and less to prosecute people. There was a "decline in pass law prosecutions over the period 1968-1981", which is not surprising considering “the new forms of tight influx controls”. There had been a radical change when the Riekert Commission recommended “that 'unlawful occupation of accommodation by persons', together with 'unlawful employment', be grounds for 'repatriation' of persons from the white area”, which meant that they changed their enforcement to "being taken off the streets and into housing and factories". Pass laws were repealed in 1986.

== Later legislation ==
The Natives (Urban Areas) Act of 1923 deemed urban areas in South Africa as "white" and required all black African men in cities and towns to carry around permits called "passes" at all times. Anyone found without a pass would be arrested immediately and sent to a rural area. It was replaced in 1945 by the Natives (Urban Areas) Consolidation Act, which imposed "influx control" on black men and also set up guidelines for removing people deemed to be living idle lives from urban areas. This act outlined requirements for African peoples' "qualification" to reside legally in white metropolitan areas. To do so, they had to have Section 10 rights, based on whether

- the person had been born there and resided there always since birth;
- the person had laboured continuously for ten years in any agreed area for any employer, or lived continuously in any such area for fifteen years;

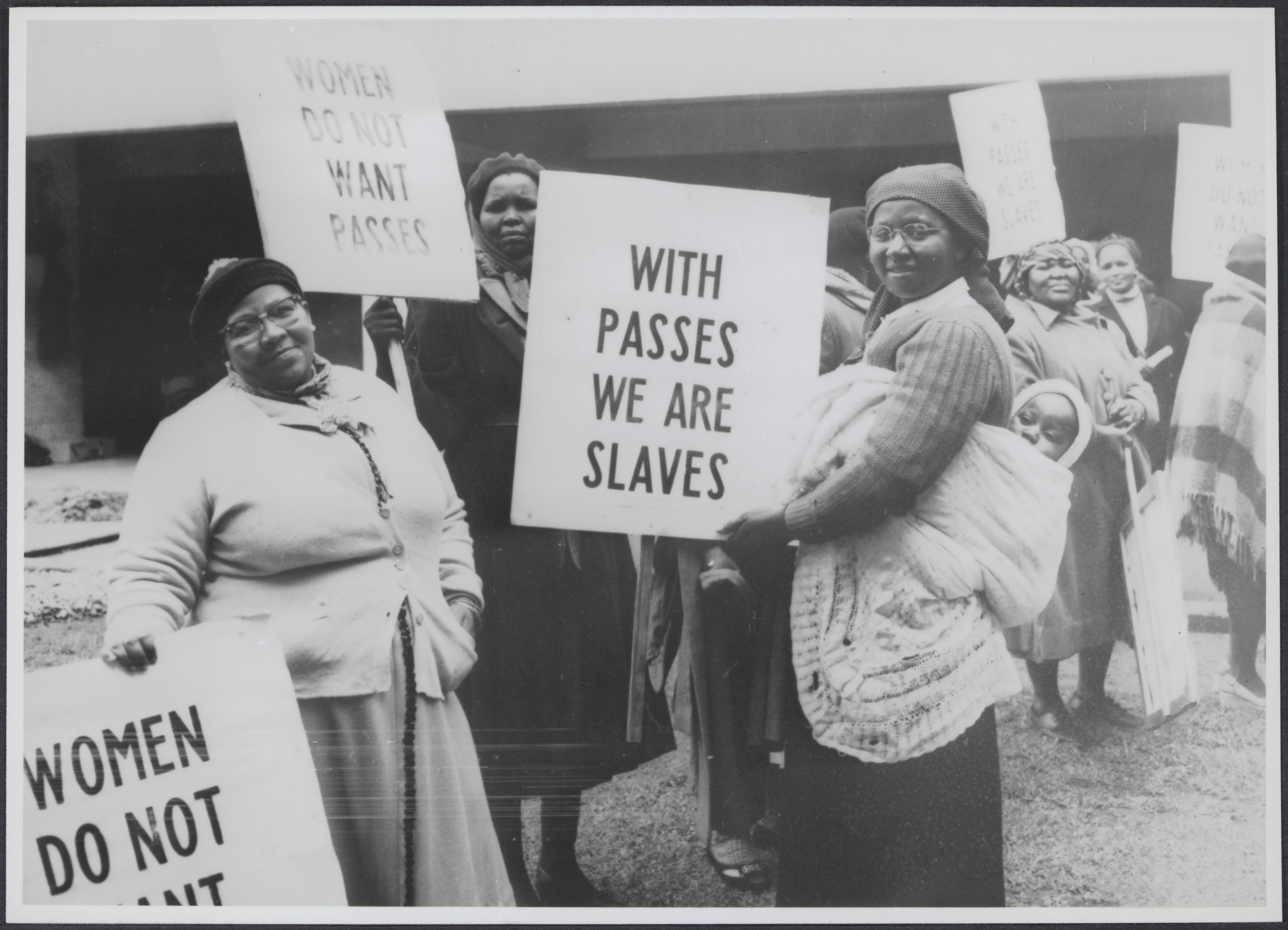
Black women demonstrate against pass laws, 1956.

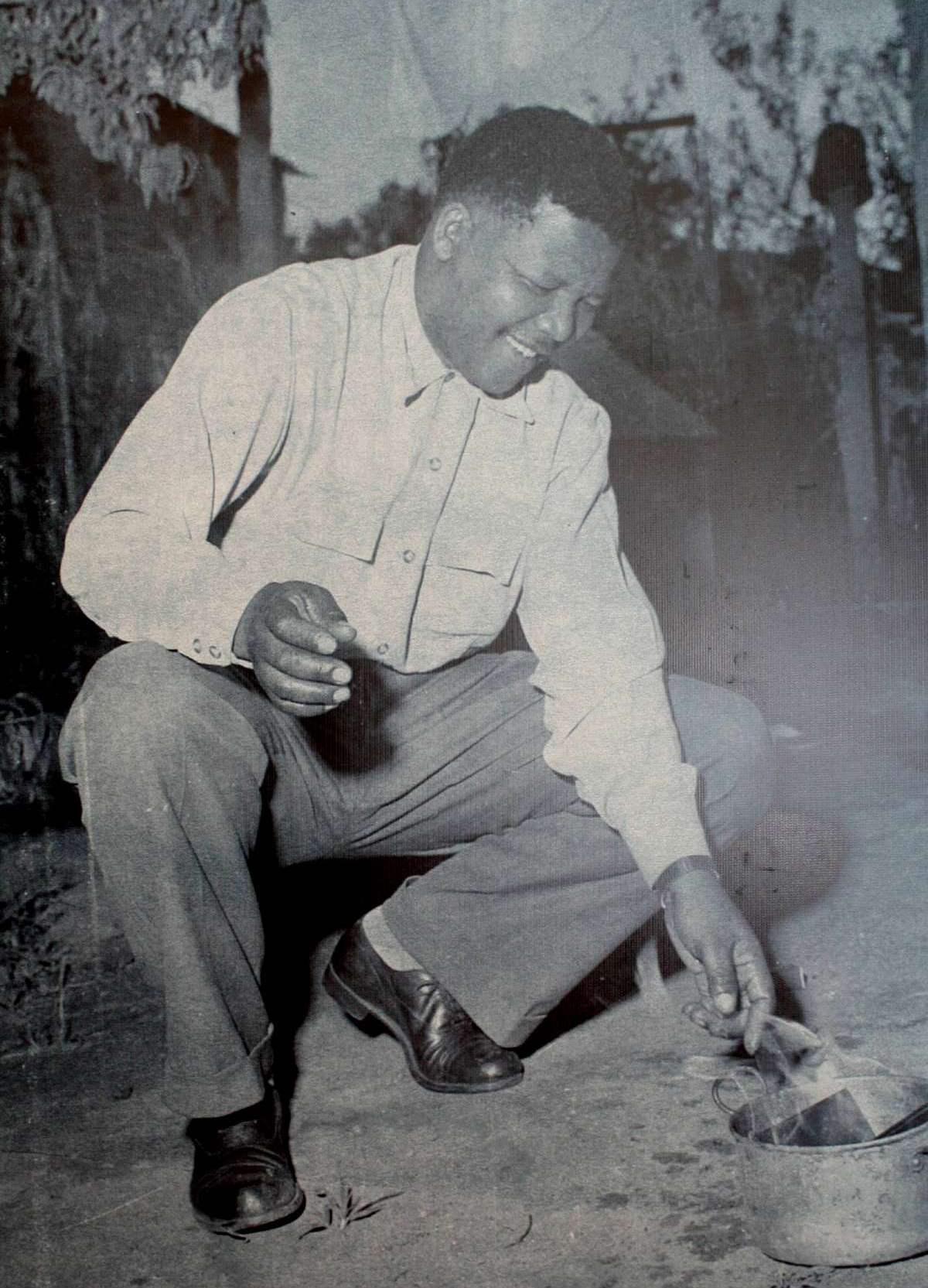
Nelson Mandela burns his passbook, 1960

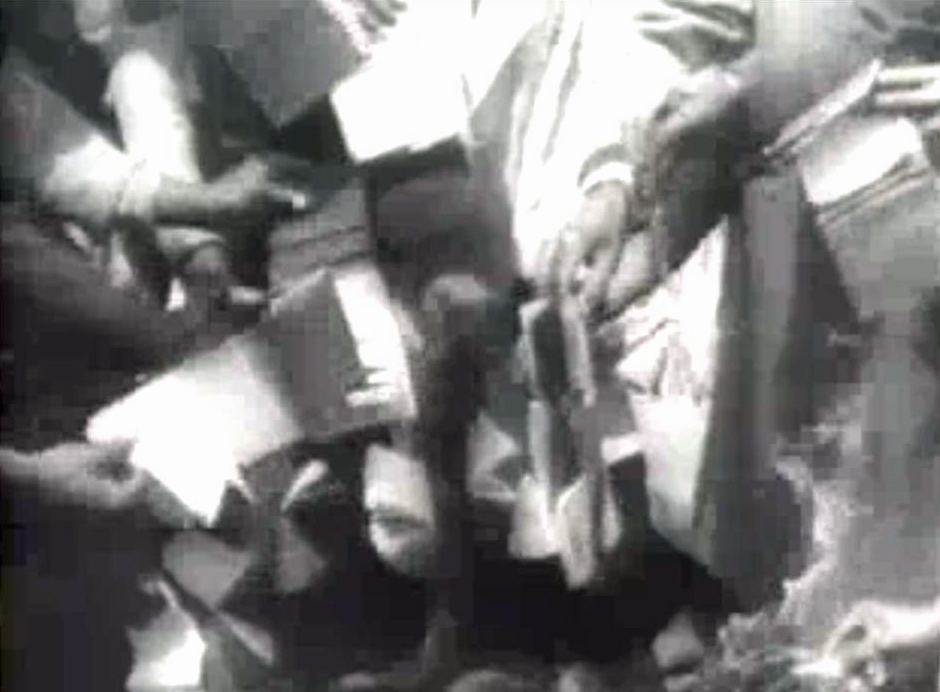
Demonstrators discarding their passbooks to protest apartheid, 1960

The Black (Natives) Laws Amendment Act of 1952 amended the 1945 Native Urban Areas Consolidation Act, stipulating that all black people over the age of 16 were required to carry passes and that no black person could stay in an urban area more than 72 hours unless allowed to by Section 10. The Natives (Abolition of Passes and Co-ordination of Documents) Act of 1952, commonly known as the Pass Laws Act, repealed the many regional pass laws and instituted one nationwide pass law, which made it compulsory for all black South Africans over the age of 16 to carry the "passbook" at all times within white areas. The law stipulated where, when, and for how long a person could remain.

The document was similar to an internal passport, containing details on the bearer such as their fingerprints, photograph, the name of his/her employer, his/her address, how long the bearer had been employed, as well as other identification information. Employers often entered a behavioural evaluation, on the conduct of the pass holder.

An employer was defined under the law and could only be a white person. The pass also documented permission requested and denied or granted to be in a certain region and the reason for seeking such permission. Under the terms of the law, any government employee could strike out such entries, basically cancelling the permission to remain in the area.

A passbook without a valid entry then allowed officials to arrest and imprison the bearer of the pass. These passes often became the most despised symbols of apartheid. The resistance to the Pass Law led to many thousands of arrests and was the spark that ignited the Sharpeville Massacre on March 21, 1960, and led to the arrest of Robert Sobukwe that day.

Colloquially, passes were often called the dompas, literally meaning the "stupid pass" or perhaps as a syllabic abbreviation for "domestic passport".

Apart from discrimination against black people, there was also discrimination against the so-called "coloured people." The "coloured" included all Indians, Chinese and Arabs, as well as those of "mixed" black/white ethnicity. Indian people, for example, were barred from the Orange Free State.

== Organised resistance ==
These discriminatory regulations fueled growing discontent from the black population. The 1910s saw significant opposition to pass laws being applied to black women.

In 1919, the revolutionary syndicalist International Socialist League (South Africa), in conjunction with the syndicalist Industrial Workers of Africa and the early African National Congress, organised a major anti-pass campaign.

The 1950s saw the ANC begin the Defiance Campaign to oppose the pass laws. This conflict climaxed at the Sharpeville Massacre, where the anti-pass protestors led by the rival breakaway Pan Africanist Congress of Azania (PAC) surrounded the Sharpeville police station, prompting the police to open fire, killing 69 people and injuring over 180. Subsequent protests and strikes were met with major repression and the ANC and PAC were both banned.

== Repeal in 1986 ==
On July 24, 1986, as part of a process of removing some apartheid laws, the South African government lifted the requirement to carry passbooks, although the pass law system itself was not yet repealed. The system of pass laws was formally repealed retroactive on April 23, 1986, with the Abolition of Influx Control Act. Helen Suzman (MP) mentioned the act as the most eminent reform a government had ever introduced.

== See also ==
- Bantustan
- Labour brokering
- 1971–72 Namibian contract workers strike
- Ghetto
- Jim Crow laws
- Pass system (Canadian history)
