= Temporary work =

Type of employment

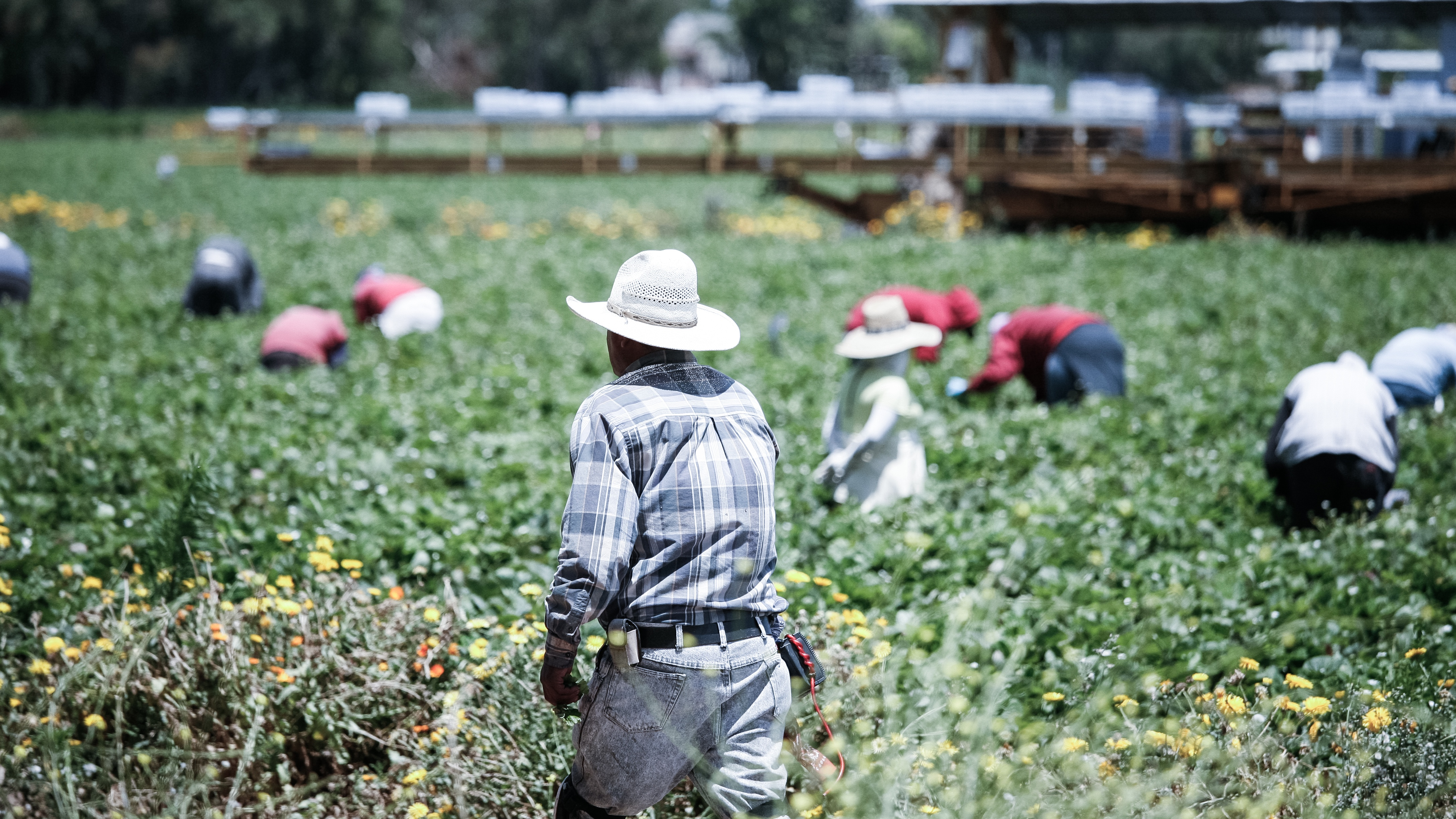
Mexican fruit pickers

Temporary work or temporary employment (also called gigs) refers to an employment situation where the working arrangement is limited to a certain period of time, based on the needs of the employing organization. Temporary employees are sometimes called "contractual", "seasonal", "interim", "casual staff", "outsourcing", and "freelance"; the terms may also be shortened to "temps". In some instances, temporary, highly skilled professionals (particularly in the white-collar worker fields, such as human resources, research and development, engineering, and accounting) refer to themselves as consultants. Increasingly, executive-level positions (e.g., CEO, CIO, CFO, CMO, CSO) are also filled with interim executives or fractional executives.

Temporary work is different from secondment, which involves temporarily assigning a member of one organization to another. In this case, the employee typically retains their salary and other employment rights from their primary organization. Still, they work closely with other organizations to provide training and share experiences.

Temporary workers may work full-time or part-time depending on the individual situation. In some instances, temporary workers receive benefits (such as health insurance), but usually benefits are only given to permanent employees as a cost-cutting measure by the employer to save money. Not all temporary employees find jobs through a temporary employment agency. With the rise of the Internet and gig economy (a labor market characterized by the prevalence of short-term contracts or freelance work as opposed to permanent jobs), many workers are now finding short-term jobs through freelance marketplaces: a situation that brings into being a global market for work.

A temporary work agency, temp agency or temporary staffing firm finds and retains workers. Other companies in need of short-term workers contract with the temporary work agency to send temporary workers, or temps, on assignments to work at the other companies. Temporary employees are also used in cyclical work, requiring frequent staffing adjustments.

== History ==
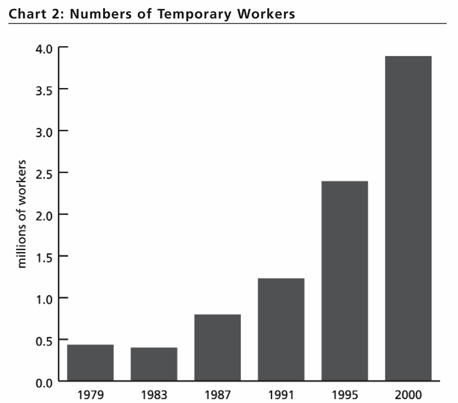
Trends in temporary work (US): Source: D. H. Author, Outsourcing at Will: The Contribution of Dismissal Doctrine to the Growth of Employment Outsourcing

The staffing industry in the United States began after World War II with small agencies in urban areas employing housewives for part-time work as office workers. Over the years, the advantages of having workers who could be hired and laid off on short notice and were exempt from paperwork and regulatory requirements led to a gradual but substantial increase in the number of temporary workers, with over 3.5 million employed in the United States by 2000.

There has been a paradigm shift since the 1940s in how firms utilize temporary workers. Throughout the Fordist era, temporary workers constituted a relatively small share of the total labor force in North America. Typically, temporary workers were white women in pink-collar, clerical positions who provided companies with a stopgap solution for permanent workers needing a leave of absence for vacation or illness. In contrast, in the Post-Fordist period, characterized by neoliberalism, deindustrialization and the dismantling of the welfare state, these understandings of temporary labor began to shift. In this paradigm, the idea of the temporary worker as a stopgap solution to permanent labor became an entirely normative employment alternative to permanent work.

Therefore, temporary workers no longer represented a substitute for permanent workers on leave but instead occupied semi-permanent, precarious positions, routinely subject to elimination due to fluctuations in the company's product. In today's temporary labor force, both people and positions have become temporary, and temporary agencies use temporary workers systematically and plan rather than on an impromptu basis.

Temporary employment has become more prevalent in America due to the rise of the Internet and the gig economy. The "gig economy" is a labor market characterized by short-term contracts and freelance work rather than permanent jobs. It is a common misconception that participation in the gig economy is a relatively new method of employment. However, finding work in the gig economy is similar to the employment style before the Industrial Revolution. It is the "one-person, one-career model" that society is accustomed to, and the gig economy is disrupting a relatively recent phenomenon. Before the Industrial Revolution in the 19th century, it was common for one person to take on multiple temporary jobs to piece together livable earnings.

== Post-Fordism ==
As the market began to transform from Fordism to a post-order regime of capital accumulation, the social regulation of labor markets and the very nature of work began to shift. This transformation has been characterized by an economic restructuring that emphasized flexibility within spaces of work, labor markets, employment relationships, wages and benefits. Indeed, global processes of neoliberalism and market rule contributed greatly to this increasing pressure on local labor markets towards flexibility. This greater flexibility within labor markets is important at the global level, particularly within OECD countries and liberal market economies (see liberal market economy).

The temporary labor industry is worth over €157 billion per year, and the most prominent agencies are spread across over 60 nations. The biggest temporary work agencies are most profitable in emerging economies of the Global North and those that have undergone market liberalization, deregulation, and (re)regulation.

Temporary work opportunities and restrictions vary around the world. Chile, Colombia, and Poland have the highest percentage of temporary dependent employment at 28.7%, 28.3%, and 27.5%, respectively. Romania, Lithuania, and Estonia have the lowest percentages of temporary dependent employment, ranging from 1% to 4%. The United Kingdom has 6% temporary employment, Germany has 13%, and France has 16%. In many countries, there are no restrictions on the type of temporary work that is legal, including the United Kingdom, Canada, China, Sweden, and Denmark. The United Kingdom has the Temporary Agency Work Directive 2008 in place, which ensures equal pay and treatment for temporary workers. Similarly, Brazil enforces full-time employment regulations against part-time employment and outsourcing. In some countries, including Brazil, there is a wage gap between temporary and permanent workers, but this is due to violations of legislation that specify equal wage determination. In other countries, prohibitions are placed on temporary employment in fields such as agriculture, construction, and non-core employment. In Mexico, a temporary employee is "prohibited to perform the same work as a regular employee", making temporary work illegal.

Gig-economy-based temporary work is prevalent worldwide. Uber, for example, operates in North, Central, and South America; Europe; the Middle East; Africa; East, South, and Southeast Asia; Australia; and New Zealand. Airbnb advertises listings in 191 countries around the world, with the most in Europe.

The temporary work industry focuses on marketing flexible and adaptable temporary workers. Individual agencies have adopted competitive practices, including "try before you buy" options, to recruit and position temporary workers. Through this process, temporary agencies define and market the characteristics of the ideal temporary worker.

== Agencies ==
The role of a temp agency is as a third party between the client employer and the client employee. This third party handles remuneration, work scheduling, complaints, taxes, etc., created by the relationship between a client employer and a client employee. Client firms request the type of work to be done and the skills required to do it. Client firms can also terminate an assignment and file a complaint about the temp. Work schedules are determined by assignment, which is determined by the agency and can last for an indeterminate period, extended to any point, and cut short. Because the assignments are temporary, there is little incentive to provide benefits, and the pay is low in situations with a lot of labor flexibility (Nurses are an exception to this since there is currently a shortage). Workers can refuse assignment but risk going through an indeterminate period of downtime since work is based on the availability of assignments, which the agency cannot "create", only fill.

Whether the work comes through an independent gig economy source or a temp agency, when a temporary employee agrees to an assignment, they receive instructions about the job. The agency also provides information on correct work attire, work hours, wages, and who to report to. If a temporary employee arrives at a job assignment and is asked to perform duties not described when they accepted the job, they may call an agency representative for clarification. If they choose not to continue with the assignment due to these discrepancies, they will most likely lose pay and may undermine their chances of other job opportunities. However, some agencies guarantee an employee a certain number of hours of pay if, upon the temporary employee's arrival, there is no work or the work is not as described. Most agencies do not require an employee to continue work if the discrepancies make it difficult for the employee to do the work.

A temporary work agency may have a standard set of tests to judge the competence of the secretarial or clerical skills of an applicant. An applicant is hired based on their scores on these tests and is placed into a database. Companies or individuals looking to hire someone temporarily contact the agency and describe the skill set they are seeking. A temporary employee is then found in the database and is contacted to see if they would be interested in taking the assignment.

It is up to the temporary employee to keep in constant contact with the agency when not currently working on an assignment; by letting the agency know that they are available to work, they are given priority over those who may be in the agency database who have not made it clear that they are ready and willing to take an assignment. A temp agency employee is the agency's exclusive employee, not the company where they are placed (though this may be subject to legal dispute). The temporary employee is bound by the rules and regulations of the temp agency, even if they conflict with those of the company where they are placed.

=== Benefits for client firms ===
There are several reasons why a firm utilizes temp agencies. They provide employers with a way to add more workers for a short-term increase in the workforce. Using temps allows firms to replace a regular employee who is absent. A temp worker's competence and value can be determined without the inflexibility of hiring a new person and waiting to see how they work out. Using temp workers can also help avoid paying benefits and increase regular employees' salaries. A firm can also use temp workers to vary compensation in ways that would normally be illegal or impossible. The role of temp workers in the workplace can also coerce regular employees into taking on more work for less pay. Additionally, temp workers are less likely to sue for mistreatment, which allows firms to reduce employment costs in high-stress, regulated jobs.

=== Growth of temporary staffing ===
Temp agencies are a growing part of industrial economies. From 1961 to 1971, the number of employees sent out by temporary staffing agencies increased by 16 percent. Temporary staffing industry payrolls increased by 166 percent from 1971 to 1981, 206 percent from 1981 to 1991, and 278 percent from 1991 to 1999. The temporary staffing sector accounted for 1 out of 12 new jobs in the 90's. In 1996, there was $105 billion worldwide in staffing agency revenues. By 2008, staffing agencies worldwide generated $300 billion in revenue. The Temporary Staffing Industry accounts for 16% of job growth in the U.S. since the Great Recession ended, even though it only accounts for 2% of all farm jobs. This growth has occurred for several reasons. Employers, not employees, primarily drive demand for temporary employment. A large driver of demand was in the European labor market. Previously, temporary employment agencies were considered quasi-legal entities. This reputation shied potential client employers away. However, in the latter half of the 20th century, a shift would be predominated by legal protections and closer relationships with primary employers. This, combined with the tendency for the TSI to grow in countries with strict regulations on the dismissal of hired employees but loose regulations on temporary work, means that growth is much faster than in industrialized nations without these labor conditions.

=== Abuse in the temporary staffing industry ===
Staffing agencies are prone to improper behavior just like any other employer. There have been cases of some temp agencies that have created and reinforced an ethnic hierarchy that determines who gets what jobs.

An additional ramification of temp workers "guest" status is at the bottom of the workplace hierarchy, which is visually identifiable on ID cards, in different colored uniforms, as well as the encouragement of more "provocative dress". Their "guest" status often means temp workers are unable to access on-site workplace accommodations and are not included in meetings despite the length of their time working at the client firm.

This is all compounded by a system in which temps must file complaints about clients through the temp agencies, which often disqualifies them not only from another assignment at that firm but also from receiving an assignment from that temporary agency upon review. Since a client firm is harder to replace than a client employee, and there is no disincentive to not give a complaining employee an assignment, there is an incentive for agencies to find employees who are willing to go along with the conditions of client firms, as opposed to severing ties with firms that routinely violate the law.

== Occupational safety and health ==
Temporary workers are at a high risk of being injured or killed on the job. In the U.S., 829 fatal injuries (17% of all occupational fatalities) occurred among contract workers in 2015. Studies have also shown a higher burden of nonfatal occupational injuries and illnesses among temporary workers compared to those in standard employment arrangements. There are many possible contributing factors to the high rates of injuries and illnesses among temporary workers. They are often inexperienced and assigned to hazardous jobs and tasks, may be reluctant to object to unsafe working conditions or to advocate for safety measures due to fear of job loss or other repercussions, and they may lack basic knowledge and skills to protect themselves from workplace hazards due to insufficient safety training. According to a joint guidance document released by the Occupational Safety and Health Administration (OSHA) and the National Institute for Occupational Safety and Health (NIOSH), both staffing agencies and host employers (i.e., the clients of staffing agencies) are responsible for providing and maintaining a safe and healthy work environment for temporary workers. Collaborative and interdisciplinary (e.g., epidemiology, occupational psychology, organizational science, economics, law, management, sociology, labor health and safety) research and intervention efforts are needed to protect and promote the occupational safety and health of temporary workers. In 2022, NIOSH and partners released a set of occupational safety and health best practices for host employers of temporary workers. Checklists to foster adoption of the best practices and a slide deck staffing companies can use to educate their host employer clients about the best practices are also included.

== Pros and cons ==
=== Pros ===
- Easy hire: Those meeting technical requirements for the type of work are often virtually guaranteed a job without a selection process. In this sense, it could be argued that finding work as a temporary worker would be more accessible. Also, in some cases, agencies will hire temporary workers without submission of a résumé or an interview
- Potential for flexible hours which can lead to happier employees
- There is an opportunity to gain experience—companies are all unique, so that the temporary worker will be exposed to a plethora of different situations and office procedures
- Some companies do not hire internally and use these staffing services only. They are an excellent gateway to get employment with a certain company.
- Try before you buy: temporary staff allows a business to try a worker as part of its team and confirm that they are a good fit before taking them on board long-term if needed.
- Temporary work can be extremely lucrative for those in less wealthy countries.
- Temporary work with internet-based companies offers a source of supplemental income.
- Temporary work may be a way in which someone who has retired can re-enter the workforce.

=== Cons ===
Workers, scholars, union organizers, and activists have identified many cons of temporary work, including the gig economy. These include:

- Lack of control over working hours and the potential for immediate termination for refusing an assigned schedule.
- Positions often are with high turnover rates. Research suggests that plants choose temporary workers over permanent ones when they expect output to fall, which allows them to avoid costs associated with laying off permanent employees
- Lack of reference, since many employers of experienced job positions do not consider work done for a temporary agency as sufficient on a résumé
- In the United States, the gradual replacement of workers by temporary workers resulted in millions of workers being employed in low-paid temporary jobs.
- In the U.S., the hourly wage paid to a temporary worker is 75% to 80% of what direct-hire employees are paid. Additionally, they often receive few or no employment benefits, such as health insurance, and seldom become full-time employees from their temporary positions.
- Unlike temporary workers hired through a staffing agency, many people in the gig economy do not report their income to the IRS, resulting in an estimated $214.6 billion in the United States alone of unreported income. This can result in fines or jail time.
- In South Asia and Sub-Saharan Africa, temporary workers often suffer from overworking.
- The temporary workforce can become oversaturated, leading to other issues such as wage deflation.
- When a company hires internationally, there is no legal precedent for using the laws of the hiring company's country of origin or the temporary worker's country of origin.

== Legal issues ==
Scholars have argued that neoliberal policies have been prominent in erasing the standard employment relationship. This precarious new model of employment has greatly reduced the worker's ability to negotiate and, in particular, with the introduction of advanced technology (that can easily replace the worker), reduced the temp's bargaining power. Internet-based companies such as Uber and Handy have come into conflict with authorities and workers for circumventing labor and social security obligations. It has been suggested that labour regulations in North America do little in addressing labour market insecurities and the precarious nature of temporary labour. In many cases, legislation has done little to acknowledge or adapt to the growth of non-standard employment in Canada.

California Assembly Bill 5 in 2019 addressed the issue of contract workers, including those in the gig economy, and set stricter requirements that must be satisfied for a worker to be classified as a contractor and not an employee, as employees receive more worker protection and benefits than contractors. In 2018, Kentucky (HB 220), Utah, Indiana (HB 1286), Iowa (SF 2257), and Tennessee (SB 1967) passed laws that specified certain on-demand gig-economy workers as "marketplace contractors" and classified them as independent contractors.

In the European Union, temporary work is regulated by the Temporary Agency Work Directive and the Member States' laws implementing that directive.

Lawsuits have addressed some of the controversies about the status of temporary workers in the sharing economy. For example, two class-action lawsuits settled in 2016 led to changes to Uber's employment policies, including clarifications of drivers' rights and the company's disciplinary procedures. Some of these policies include Uber agreeing to issue warnings to drivers before cutting them from the company's service, no longer deactivating drivers who commonly refuse rides, informing customers that tips for drivers are not included in the fare, and allowing drivers to create an association to contest terminations. However, the legal settlement did not establish whether these workers are employees or independent contractors.

== See also ==
- Consulting
- Contingent work
- Contingent workforce
- Day labor
- Division of labour
- Denham v Midland Employers' Mutual Assurance Ltd
- Employment agency
- Fractional executive
- Gig worker
- Interim executive
- Labour hire
- Labour market flexibility
- Outsourcing
- Permatemp
- Recruitment
- Up or out
- Zero-hour contract
- Platform economy
