= List of painters by name beginning with "S" =

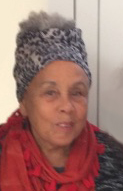
Betye Saar

Please add names of notable painters with a Wikipedia page, in precise English alphabetical order, using U.S. spelling conventions. Country and regional names refer to where painters worked for long periods, not to personal allegiances.

- Betye Saar (1926–2026), American assemblage artist
- Gaetano Sabatini (1703–1734), Italian draftsman and painter
- Jacques Sablet (1749–1803), French painter
- Pieter Jansz Saenredam (1597–1665), Dutch painter and muralist
- Cornelis Saftleven (1607–1681), Dutch painter
- Herman Saftleven (1609–1685), Dutch painter
- Sara Saftleven (1645–1702), Dutch painter
- Kay Sage (1898–1963), American artist and poet
- Anne Said (1914–1995), English artist
- Jean-Pierre Saint-Ours (1752–1809), Swiss painter
- Saitō Kiyoshi (斎藤清, 1907–1997), Japanese sōsaku-hanga artist
- Sakai Hōitsu (酒井抱一, 1761–1828), Japanese painter
- Adam Saks (born 1974), Danish painter
- Emilio Grau Sala (1911–1975), Spanish (Catalan)/French painter and illustrator
- Tahir Salahov (1928–2021), Soviet (Azerbaijani)/Russian painter and draftsman
- Stanislaw Samostrzelnik (1480–1541), Polish painter, decorator and Cistercian monk
- Joop Sanders (1921–2023), Dutch–American painter and educator
- Hans Sandreuter (1850–1901), Swiss artist and designer
- Bernat Sanjuan (1915–1979), Spanish (Catalan) painter and sculptor
- John Singer Sargent (1856–1925), American painter and draftsman
- Michael Aloysius Sarisky (1906–1974), Hungarian/American Hungarian painter
- Andrea del Sarto (1487–1531), Italian painter
- Arthur Sarkissian (born 1960), Armenian painter
- Martiros Saryan (1880–1972), Armenian painter
- Wilhelm Sasnal (born 1972), Polish painter, illustrator and film-maker
- Satake Yoshiatsu (佐竹義敦, 1748–1785), Japanese painter and feudal lord
- Junpei Satoh (佐藤淳平, born 1956), Japanese painter
- Raymond Saunders (born 1934), American assemblage artist and draftsman
- Antonio Saura (1930–1998), Spanish painter and writer
- Anne Savage (1896–1971), Canadian painter and art teacher
- Jacob Savery (1566–1603), Flemish/Dutch painter, etcher and draftsman
- Roelant Savery (1576–1639), Dutch painter
- Jenny Saville (born 1970), English painter
- Konstantin Savitsky (1844–1905), Russian painter
- Alexei Kondratyevich Savrasov (1830–1897), Russian painter
- János Saxon-Szász (born 1964), Hungarian creative artist
- Sawa Sekkyō (沢雪嶠, fl. late 18th/early 19th centuries) Japanese painter
- Jan Sawka (born 1946), Polish/American artist and architect
- Fikret Muallâ Saygı (1903–1967), Turkish painter
- Godfried Schalcken (1643–1706), Dutch painter
- Louis Schanker (1903–1981), American artist
- Hugo Scheiber (1873–1950), Hungarian/German painter
- Egon Schiele (1890–1918), Austrian painter
- Oszkar Tordai Schilling (fl. late 19th century), Hungarian etcher and draftsman
- Jakub Schikaneder (1855–1924), Austro-Hungarian (Bohemian)/Czechoslovak painter
- Helene Schjerfbeck (1862–1946), Finnish painter
- Rudolf Schlichter (1890–1955), German painter
- Richard Schmid (1934–2021), American artist
- Georg Friedrich Schmidt (1712–1775), German engraver and designer
- Johann George Schmidt (1707–1774), German Baroque architect
- Hans Werner Schmidt (1859–1950), German painter, illustrator and etcher
- Karl Schmidt-Rottluff (1884–1976), German painter and print-maker
- Ruth Schmidt Stockhausen (1922–2014), German painter, graphic artist and sculptor
- Randall Schmit (born 1955), American painter
- Stella Schmolle (1908–1975), English painter
- Julian Schnabel (born 1952), American painter and film-maker
- Wilhelm Schnarrenberger (1892–1966), German painter
- Gérard Ernest Schneider (1896–1986), Swiss painter
- Georg Scholz (1890–1945), German painter
- Floris van Schooten (1590–1655), Dutch painter
- Otto Marseus van Schrieck (1619–1678), Dutch painter
- Georg Schrimpf (1889–1938), German painter and graphic artist
- Adolf Schrödter (1805–1875), German painter and illustrator
- Daniel Schultz (1615–1683), Polish-Lithuanian painter
- Ethel Schwabacher (1903–1984), American painter
- Carlos Schwabe (1877–1926), Swiss painter and print-maker
- Randolph Schwabe (1885–1948), English painter and etcher
- Hans Schwarz (1922–2003), Austrian portrait painter
- Kurt Schwitters (1887–1948), German artist
- Alexander Scott (1872–1932), English/American painter
- Caroline Lucy Scott (1784–1857), English landscape painter and novelist
- Kathleen Scott (1878–1947), English sculptor
- Peter Scott (1909–1989), English artist and conservationist
- Richard T. Scott (born 1980), American history painter and writer
- Samuel Scott (1703–1772), English painter and etcher
- Tom Scott RSA (1854–1927), Scottish painter
- William Edouard Scott (1884–1964), American artist
- Eduardo Lefebvre Scovell (1864–1918), English/American artist
- Sean Scully (born 1945), Irish/American painter, sculptor and photographer
- Felipe Seade (1912–1969), Uruguayan painter and teacher
- Otakar Sedloň (1885–1973), Austro-Hungarian (Czech)/Czechoslovak painter
- Richard Sedlon (1900–1991), American painter
- Lasar Segall (1891–1957), German/Brazilian painter, engraver and sculptor
- Daniel Seghers (1590–1661), Flemish painter and Jesuit brother
- Gerard Seghers (1591–1651), Flemish painter and art collector
- Hercules Seghers (1589–1638), Dutch painter and print-maker
- Kurt Seligmann (1900–1962), Swiss/American painter and engraver
- Manuel Rendón Seminario (1894–1982), French/Ecuadorian painter
- Jacek Sempoliński (1927–2012), Polish painter, draftsman and critic
- Sengai (仙厓義梵, 1750–1837), Japanese sumi-e painter
- Sohrab Sepehri (1928–1980), Iranian poet and painter
- Zinaida Serebriakova (1884–1967), Russian/French painter
- Valentin Aleksandrovich Serov (1865–1911), Russian painter
- Clément Serveau (1886–1972), French painter, engraver and illustrator
- Bela Čikoš Sesija (1864–1931), Austro-Hungarian (Croat)/Yugoslav painter, art teacher and academy founder
- Sesshū Tōyō (雪舟等楊, 1420–1506), Japanese ink and wash painter
- James Sessions American painter (1882-1962)
- Henriett Seth F. (born 1980), Hungarian artist, poet and musician
- Georges Seurat (1859–1891), French artist
- Gino Severini (1883–1966), Italian painter
- Joseph Severn (1793–1879), English painter
- Shang Xi (商喜, fl. c. 1430–1440), Chinese painter
- Emily Shanks (1857–1936), Russian/English painter
- Charles Haslewood Shannon (1863–1937), English painter and lithographer
- Shao Mi (邵彌, c. 1592–1642), Chinese painter, calligrapher and poet
- Harold Shapinsky (1925–2004), American painter
- Tōshūsai Sharaku (東洲斎写楽, 1794–1795), Japanese ukiyo-e print designer
- Sylvester Shchedrin (1791–1830), Russian painter
- Millard Sheets (1907–1989), American artist, teacher and administrator
- Samuel Shelley (1750–1808), English miniaturist
- Rupert Shephard (1909–1992), English painter and illustrator
- Shen Che-Tsai (沈哲哉, 1926–2017), Chinese (Taiwanese) painter
- Shen Quan (沈銓, 1682–1760), Chinese painter
- Shen Shichong (沈士充, fl. 14th, 15th or 16th century), Chinese painter
- Shen Zhou (沈周, 1427–1509), Chinese painter
- Sheng Mao (盛懋, fl. late 13th or 14th century), Chinese painter
- Sheng Maoye (盛茂燁, fl. 14th, 15th or 16th century), Chinese painter
- Shi Rui (石銳, fl. 14th or 15th century), Chinese painter
- Shi Zhonggui (史忠貴, born 1954), Chinese painter, philosopher and poet
- Shiba Kōkan (司馬江漢, 1747–1818), Japanese painter and print-maker
- Shibata Zeshin (司馬江漢, 1807–1891), Japanese painter and lacquer and print artist
- Kitao Shigemasa (北尾重政, 1739–1820), Japanese ukiyo-e painter
- Shōzō Shimamoto (嶋本昭三, 1928–2013), Japanese artist
- Kanzan Shimomura (下村 観山, 1873–1930), Japanese nihonga painter
- Siona Shimshi (1939–2018), Israeli painter, sculptor and ceramicist
- Shin Saimdang (신사임당, 1504–1551), Korean artist, calligraphist and poet
- Shin Yun-bok (신윤복, 1758–1813), Korean painter
- Shingei (真芸, 1431–1485), Japanese yamato-e painter
- Everett Shinn (1876–1953), American painter
- Shinoda Toko (篠田桃紅, 1913–2021), Japanese sumi ink painter and print-maker
- Ivan Shishkin (1832–1898), Russian painter
- Shitao (石濤, 1642–1707), Chinese painter
- Harry Shoulberg (1903–1995), American painter
- Shūbun Tenshō (天章周文, died c. 1444–1450), Japanese painter and Zen Buddhist monk
- Shukei Sesson (雪村, 1504–1589), Japanese painter and Zen monk
- Kevin A. Short (born 1960), American painter and print-maker
- Edward Scrope Shrapnel (1845–1920), Canadian painter
- Ram Chandra Shukla (1925–2016), Indian painter and art critic
- Shunbaisai Hokuei (春梅斎北英, died 1837), Japanese ukiyo-e woodblock print-maker
- Shunkōsai Hokushū (春好斎北洲, fl. 1802–1832), Japanese ukiyo-e woodblock print-maker
- Walter Sickert (1860–1942), English painter and print-maker
- Gregorius Sickinger (1558–1631), Swiss painter, draftsman and engraver
- Henryk Siemiradzki (1843–1902), Polish/Italian painter
- Paul Signac (1863–1935), French painter
- Telemaco Signorini (1835–1901), Italian artist
- Ramón Silva (1890–1919), Argentine painter
- Sim Sa-jeong (심사정, 1707–1769), Korean painter
- Josef Šíma (1891–1971), Austro-Hungarian (Czech)/Czechoslovak painter
- Hugo Simberg (1873–1917), Finnish painter and graphic artist
- Józef Simmler (1823–1868), Polish painter
- Sidney Simon (1917–1997), American painter, sculptor and war artist
- Edward Simmons (1852–1931), American painter and muralist
- Enrique Simonet (1866–1927), Spanish painter
- David Simpson (born 1928), American painter
- Ruth Simpson (1889–1964), English painter
- William Simpson (c. 1818 – 1872), African American portrait painter.
- Oliver Sin (born 1985), Hungarian painter and science illustrator
- Sin Wi (신위, 1769–1847), Korean painter and scholar
- David Alfaro Siqueiros (1896–1974), Mexican painter and muralist
- Mario Sironi (1885–1961), Italian painter
- Alfred Sisley (1839–1899), French painter
- Michael Sittow (1469–1525), Netherlandish/Spanish royal painter
- Robert Sivell (1888–1958), Scottish painter
- Archibald Skirving (1749–1819), Scottish portrait painter
- P.C. Skovgaard (1817–1875), Danish painter
- Antonín Slavíček (1870–1910), Austro-Hungarian (Czech) painter
- Fyodor Slavyansky (1817–1876), Russian painter
- Sylvia Sleigh (1916–2010), English/American painter
- Max Slevogt (1868–1932), German painter and illustrator
- Władysław Ślewiński (1854–1918), Polish/French painter
- Pieter Cornelisz van Slingelandt (1640–1691), Dutch painter
- Hamilton Sloan (born 1946), Northern Irish painter
- John Sloan (1871–1951), American painter and etcher
- Arie Smit (1916–2016), Dutch/Indonesian painter
- Grace Cossington Smith (1892–1984), Australian painter
- Jack Smith (1928–2011), English artist
- Leon Polk Smith (1906–1996), American painter
- Matthew Smith (1879–1959), English painter
- Xanthus Russell Smith (1839–1929), American painter
- Franciszek Smuglewicz (1745–1807), Polish/Lithuanian draftsman and painter
- Eero Snellman (1890–1951), Finnish painter
- Peter Snow (1927–2008), English painter, theater designer and teacher
- Sylvia Snowden (born 1942), American painter
- Joan Snyder (born 1940), American painter
- Sō Shiseki (宋紫石, 1715–1786), Japanese painter
- Sōami (相阿弥, died 1525), Japanese painter
- Gerard Soest (1600–1681), English portrait painter
- Koloman Sokol (1902–2003), Austro-Hungarian (Slovak)/Czechoslovak painter, graphic artist and illustrator
- Xul Solar (1887–1963), Argentine painter, sculptor and writer
- Josep Rovira Soler, (1900–1998), Spanish (Catalan)/Cuban painter
- Anton Solomoukha (born 1945), Soviet/French artist and photographer
- Konstantin Somov (1869–1939), Russian/French artist
- Jens Søndergaard (1895–1957), Danish painter
- Song Maojin (宋懋晉, fl. 14th, 15th or 16th c.), Chinese painter
- Song Xu (宋旭, 1525–1606), Chinese painter and Buddhist priest
- Rajesh Soni (born 1981), Indian artist and photographer
- Eyolf Soot (1859–1928), Norwegian artist
- David G. Sorensen (1937–2011), Canadian artist
- Hendrik Martenszoon Sorgh (1610–1670), Dutch painter
- Joaquín Sorolla (1863–1923), Spanish painter
- John Souch (1593/1594–1645), English portrait painter
- Pierre Soulages (1919–2022), French painter, engraver and sculptor
- Camille Souter (1929–2023), Irish painter
- Chaïm Soutine (1894–1944), Russian/French painter
- Amadeo de Souza Cardoso (1887–1918), Portuguese painter
- Isaac Soyer (1902–1981), American painter
- Moses Soyer (1899–1974), American painter
- Raphael Soyer (1899–1987), American painter, draftsman and print-maker
- Austin Osman Spare (1886–1956), English draftsman, painter and oculist
- Stanley Spencer (1891–1959), English painter
- Nancy Spero (1926–2009), American visual artist
- Carl Spitzweg (1808–1885), German painter
- Sebastian Spreng (born 1956), Argentine/American visual artist and writer on music
- Ignatius Sserulyo (born 1937), Ugandan painter
- Nicolas de Staël (1914–1955), French painter
- Jan Stanisławski (1860–1907), Austro-Hungarian (Polish) painter
- Otto Stark (1859–1926), American artist, print-maker and illustrator
- Wojciech Korneli Stattler (1800–1875), Polish painter and professor
- Karl Stauffer-Bern (1857–1891), Swiss painter, etcher and sculptor
- Henryk Stażewski (1894–1988), Polish painter
- Karel Štěch (1908–1982), Czechoslovak painter, graphic designer and illustrator
- T. C. Steele (1847–1926), American painter
- John Steell (1804–1891), Scottish sculptor
- Jan Steen (c. 1626 – 1679), Dutch painter
- Hendrik van Steenwijk I (1550–1603), Dutch/German painter
- Hendrik van Steenwijk II (1580–1649), Flemish/Dutch painter
- Philip Wilson Steer (1860–1942), English painter and art teacher
- Joe Stefanelli (1921–2017), American painter
- Johann Gottfried Steffan (1815–1905), Swiss/German landscape painter
- Georges Stein (1818–1890), French painter
- Jacob Steinhardt (1887–1968), German/Israeli painter and woodcut artist
- Eduard von Steinle (1810–1886), Austrian/German painter
- Théophile Steinlen (1859–1923), Swiss/French painter and print-maker
- Juan Carlos Stekelman (1936–2015), Argentine painter and print-maker
- Frank Stella (1936–2024), American painter, sculptor and print-maker
- Joseph Stella (1877–1946), Italian/American painter
- Hedda Sterne (1910–2011), Romanian/American artist
- Matej Sternen (1870–1949), Austro-Hungarian (Slovenian)/Yugoslav painter
- David Watson Stevenson (1842–1904), Scottish sculptor
- Helen Stevenson (fl. 1920–1935), Scottish artist and print-maker
- Robert Macaulay Stevenson (1854–1952), Scottish painter
- William Grant Stevenson (1849–1919), Scottish sculptor and painter
- Andrew Stevovich (born 1948), American painter
- Julius LeBlanc Stewart (1855–1919), American/French painter
- LeConte Stewart (1891–1990), American artist and Mormon
- Knute Stiles (1923-2009), American painter, collagist, art critic, teacher, poet
- Clyfford Still (1904–1980), American painter
- Tobias Stimmer (1539–1584), Swiss painter and illustrator
- Andries Stock, Dutch Baroque painter (1580–1648)
- Stan Stokes (living), American painter
- Matthias Stom (c. 1600 – c. 1652), Dutch or Flemish/Italian painter
- Abraham Storck (1644–1708), Dutch painter and draftsman
- Thomas Stothard (1755–1834), English painter, illustrator and engraver
- William Stott (1857–1900), English painter
- Hendrick van Streeck (1659 – post–1720), Dutch painter of interiors
- Juriaen van Streeck (1632–1687), Dutch painter
- Arthur Streeton (1867–1943), Australian painter
- Bartholomeus Strobel (1591–1650), German/Polish painter
- Halfdan Strøm (1863–1949), Norwegian artist
- Ancell Stronach (1901–1981), Scottish artist
- Joseph Dwight Strong (1853–1899), American artist and photographer
- Bernardo Strozzi (1581–1644), Italian painter and engraver
- Drew Struzan (born 1947), American artist, illustrator and poster designer
- Zofia Stryjenska (1891–1976), Polish painter, illustrator and stage designer
- Wladyslaw Strzeminski (1893–1952), Polish painter
- Gilbert Stuart (1755–1828), American painter
- George Stubbs (1724–1806), English painter
- Franz Stuck (1863–1928), German painter, sculptor and architect
- Walter Stuempfig (1914–1970), American artist and teacher
- January Suchodolski (1797–1875), Polish painter and army officer
- Serge Sudeikin (1882–1946), Russian artist and set designer
- Sudip Roy (born 1960), Indian artist
- Alberto Sughi (1928–2012), Italian painter
- Sugimura Jihei (杉村治平, fl. 1681–1703), Japanese ukiyo-e print-maker
- Yasushi Sugiyama (杉山寧, 1909–1993), Japanese nihonga painter
- William Holmes Sullivan (1836–1908), English history painter
- Altoon Sultan (born 1948), American painter in egg tempera
- Sava Šumanović (1896–1942), Yugoslav (Serbian) painter
- Kelly Sueda (born 1972), American painter
- Sun Junze (孙君泽, fl. 13th or 14th century), Chinese painter
- Sun Kehong (孫克弘, 1533–1611), Chinese painter, calligrapher and poet
- Sun Long (孫隆, fl. 14th century), Chinese painter
- Victor Surbek (1885–1975), Swiss painter
- Vasily Surikov (1848–1916), Russian painter
- Alan Sutherland (1931–2019), Scottish painter
- David Macbeth Sutherland (1883–1973), Scottish artist and Director of Gray's School of Art
- George B. Sutherland (fl. mid–20th century), American painter and teacher
- Graham Sutherland (1903–1980), English painter and print-maker
- Carol Sutton (born 1945), American painter
- Linda Sutton (born 1947), English painter
- Marc-Aurèle de Foy Suzor-Coté (1869–1937), Canadian painter and sculptor
- Suzuki Harunobu (鈴木春信, 1724–1770), Japanese ukiyo-e woodblock print-maker
- Max Švabinský (1873–1962), Austro-Hungarian (Czech)/Czechoslovak painter, draftsman and academy professor
- Max Walter Svanberg (1912–1994), Swedish painter, illustrator and designer
- Eva Švankmajerová (1940–2005), Czechoslovak/Czech artist
- Svend Rasmussen Svendsen (1864–1945), Norwegian/American artist
- Sardar Sobha Singh (1901–1986), Indian painter
- Sergei Sviatchenko (born 1952), Soviet (Ukrainian)/Danish collage artist
- Herman van Swanevelt (1604–1655), Dutch painter and etcher
- Roger Swainston (born 1960), Australian painter, naturalist and zoologist
- Barbara Swan (1922–2003), American painter, illustrator, and lithographer
- Sigurd Swane (1879–1973), Danish painter and poet
- Albert Swinden (1901–1961), American painter
- Fedot Sychkov (1870–1958), Russian/Soviet painter
- George Gardner Symons (1861/1863 – 1930), American painter
- Bertalan Székely (1835–1910), Hungarian painter
- Adam Szentpétery (born 1956), Hungarian painter
- Józef Szermentowski (1833–1876), Polish painter
- István Szőnyi (1894–1960), Hungarian painter
- Lili Árkayné Sztehló (1897–1959), Hungarian painter and stained-glass decorator
