= Saftleven =

Saftleven is a surname. Notable people with the surname include:

- Cornelis Saftleven (c. 1607–1681), Dutch painter
- Herman Saftleven (1609–1685), Dutch painter
- Sara Saftleven (1645–1702), Dutch Golden Age flower painter
