= Shi Zhonggui =

Shi Zhonggui may refer to:

- Shi Chonggui (石重貴; 914-947), Later Jin emperor, name could also be romanized as Shi Zhonggui
- Shi Zhonggui (painter) (史忠貴; born 1954), Chinese painter
