= Transfer =

Transfer may refer to:

== Arts and media ==
- Transfer (2010 film), a German science-fiction movie directed by Damir Lukacevic and starring Zana Marjanović
- Transfer (1966 film), a short film
- Transfer (journal), in management studies
- "A Transfer", a 1995 television episode of Neon Genesis Evangelion
- "The Transfer" (Smash), a 2013 television episode
- The Transfer, a novel by Silvano Ceccherini
- "Transfer", a song by Five for Fighting from the 2010 album Slice

== Finance ==
- Transfer payment, a redistribution of income and wealth by means of the government making a payment
- Balance transfer, transfer of the balance (either of money or credit) in an account to another account
- Money transfer (disambiguation)
  - Wire transfer, an international expedited bank-to-bank funds transfer

== Science and technology ==
=== Learning and psychology ===
- Transfer (propaganda), a method of psychological manipulation
- Knowledge transfer, within organizations
- Language transfer, in which native-language grammar and pronunciation influence the learning and use of a second language
- Transfer of learning, in education

=== Mathematics ===
- Transfer function in mathematics
- Transfer (group theory), a type of homomorphism
- Transfer principle, in mathematics

=== Other sciences ===
- Transfer (computing), movement of data between memory media
- Transfer (patent), transfer of intellectual property rights
- Call transfer, in telephony
- Electron transfer, in chemistry
- Heat transfer, in thermal engineering
- Population transfer, movement of large groups of people
- Transfer DNA, the transferred DNA of the tumor-inducing (Ti) plasmid of some species of bacteria such as Agrobacterium tumefaciens
- Fouling, transfer of unwanted material onto solid surfaces
- Trace evidence, in forensic science

== Sports and games ==
- Transfer (association football)
- Transfer, a type of bidding convention in contract bridge
  - Jacoby transfer
  - Texas transfer

== Transportation ==
- Transfer (public transit), a ticket that allows a passenger to use multiple conveyances in a single trip
- Transfer (railway station), a railway station connecting two or more lines
- Transfer (travel), local transportation as part of an itinerary

== Other uses ==
- Transfer, Pennsylvania
- Internal hiring, a move to another job in another team in the same organization
- Intra-company transfer
- College transfer
- Decal, a sticker
- Iron-on transfer
- Vote Left, Transfer Left, political pact
- The process of moving a human to or from a wheelchair or other assistive device

== See also ==
- Manhattan Transfer (disambiguation), several meanings
