= Altoon =

Altoon is a given name and surname. Notable people with the name include:

- Altoon Sultan (born 1948), American artist
- John Altoon (1925–1969), American artist
