= Oliver Sin =

Hungarian artist (born 1985)

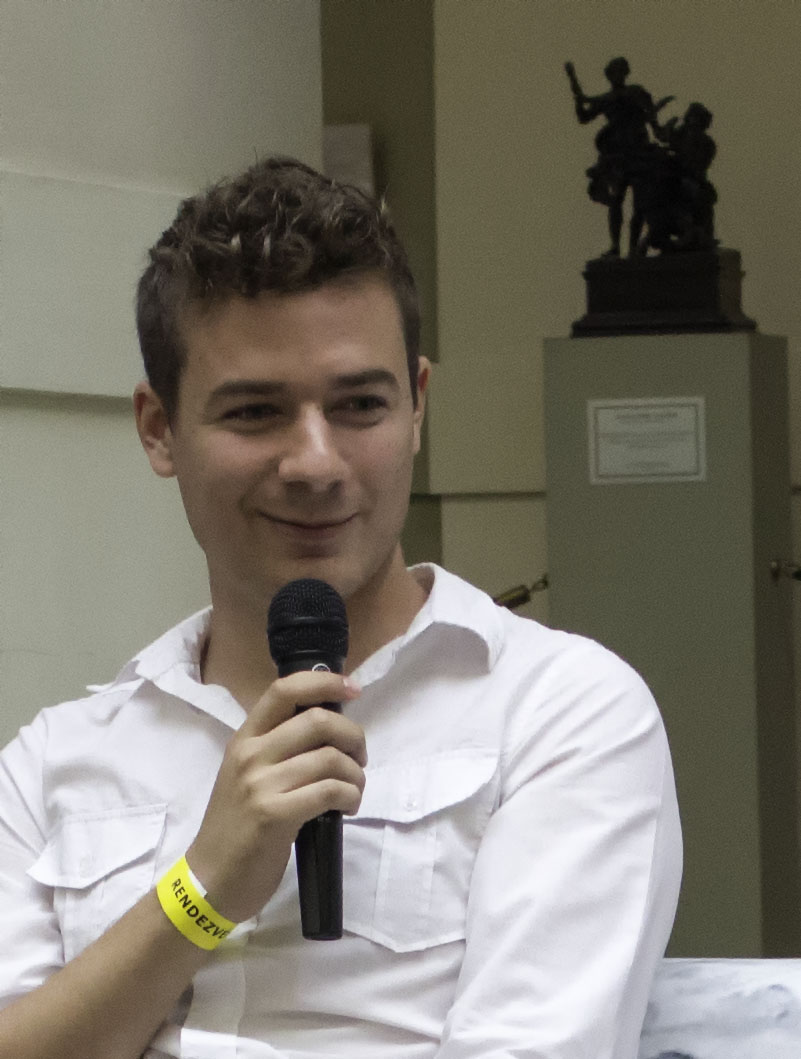
- Oliver Sin at ARC 13. award ceremony at Museum of Fine Arts, Budapest 2013
- Born: Olivér Gábor Sin; 18 May 1985 (age 41); Budapest, Hungary
- Education: Miklós Radnóti Gymnasium (Dunakeszi); University of West Hungary (Szombathely)
- Known for: science art, mathematical art
- Awards: Kodaly-Award, Art-Feszt Special Award, ARC 13. / Borz-award (the award of insolence)

Oliver Sin (born 18 May 1985) is a Hungarian artist.

== Early life and education ==
Born in Budapest, Hungary, Oliver Sin was raised with his sister Judit by his father, Zoltan Sin, a ropemaker. He became interested in art and science at an early age. He studied visual art from 2003 to 2009 at Dunakeszi's Miklós Radnóti Gymnasium. After graduation Sin enrolled in Szombathely's University of West Hungary where he majored in Visual Arts and Croatian.

=== Career ===
Sin's work first came to international attention after his collaboration with Fibenare Guitars Co., when they made the Fibenare - Oliver Sin Collaboration Guitar in 2012. He made the cover of Guitar Connoisseur Magazine (in New York, USA) in 2013.

== Exhibitions ==
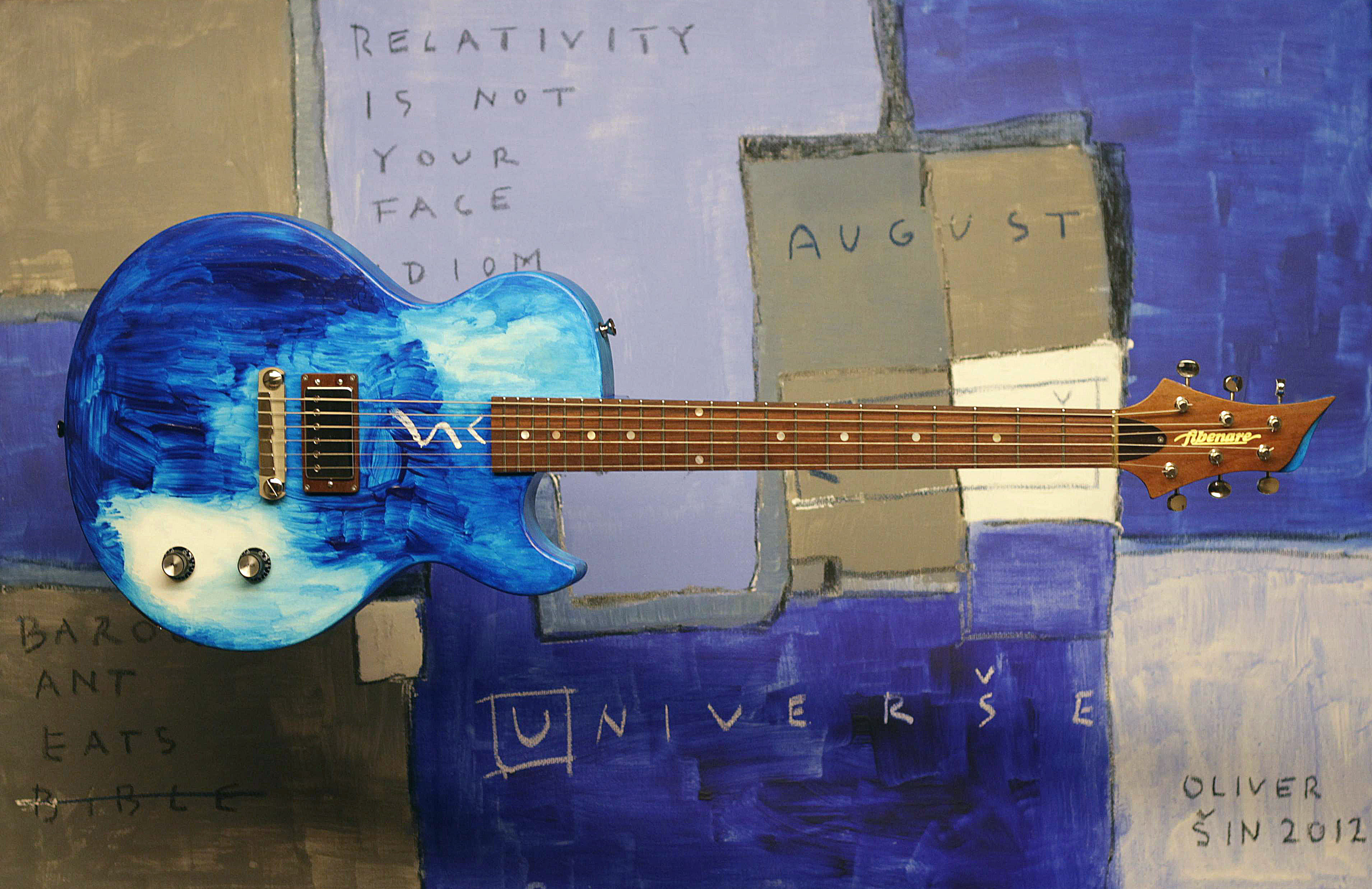

=== 2009 ===
- Budapest (Hungary), Bakelit Multi Art Center

=== 2010 ===
- Budapest (Hungary), Pszinapszis XIV

=== 2012 ===
- Érd, City Gallery (Hungary), Ez van!
- Budapest (Hungary), Syma Centre, Decoration Society Contest II.
- Budapest (Hungary), FN5, Millenáris
- Vác (Hungary), Exhibition of the Contemporary Values II. K.É.K.
- Budapest (Hungary), Bakelit Multi Art Center
- Budapest (Hungary), Abszurd Flikk-Flakk, Alle Center
- Budapest (Hungary), Bakelit Pályázat 2nd Exhibition, Fogasház Kulturális Befogadótér
- Budapest (Hungary), Honoratus Kodály Zoltán, MOM Kulturális Központ

=== 2013 ===
- Los Angeles (USA), NAMM Show / Fibenare
- Szentendre (Hungary), Budapest Art Expo Fresh VI.- International Biennial Of Young Artists
- Erzsébetliget (Hungary), Art Feszt VI.
- Újpalota (Hungary), In-Spirál Ház, Zsókavár Gallery
- Vác (Hungary), Light / Fény – Napfesztivál, Art Lavina Gallery
- Budapest (Hungary), ARC 13.
- Warsaw (Poland), Perfectionists / MODESSQE 1st, Skwer

=== 2014 ===
- Anaheim (USA), California, NAMM Show with Fibenare Guitars Co.
- Kraków (Poland), Pracownia pod Baranami (MODESSQE)
- Budapest (Hungary), My Brain Is Open, Serpenyős
- Cambridge (USA), Central Elements Cambridge Science Festival (MIT)

== Collections ==
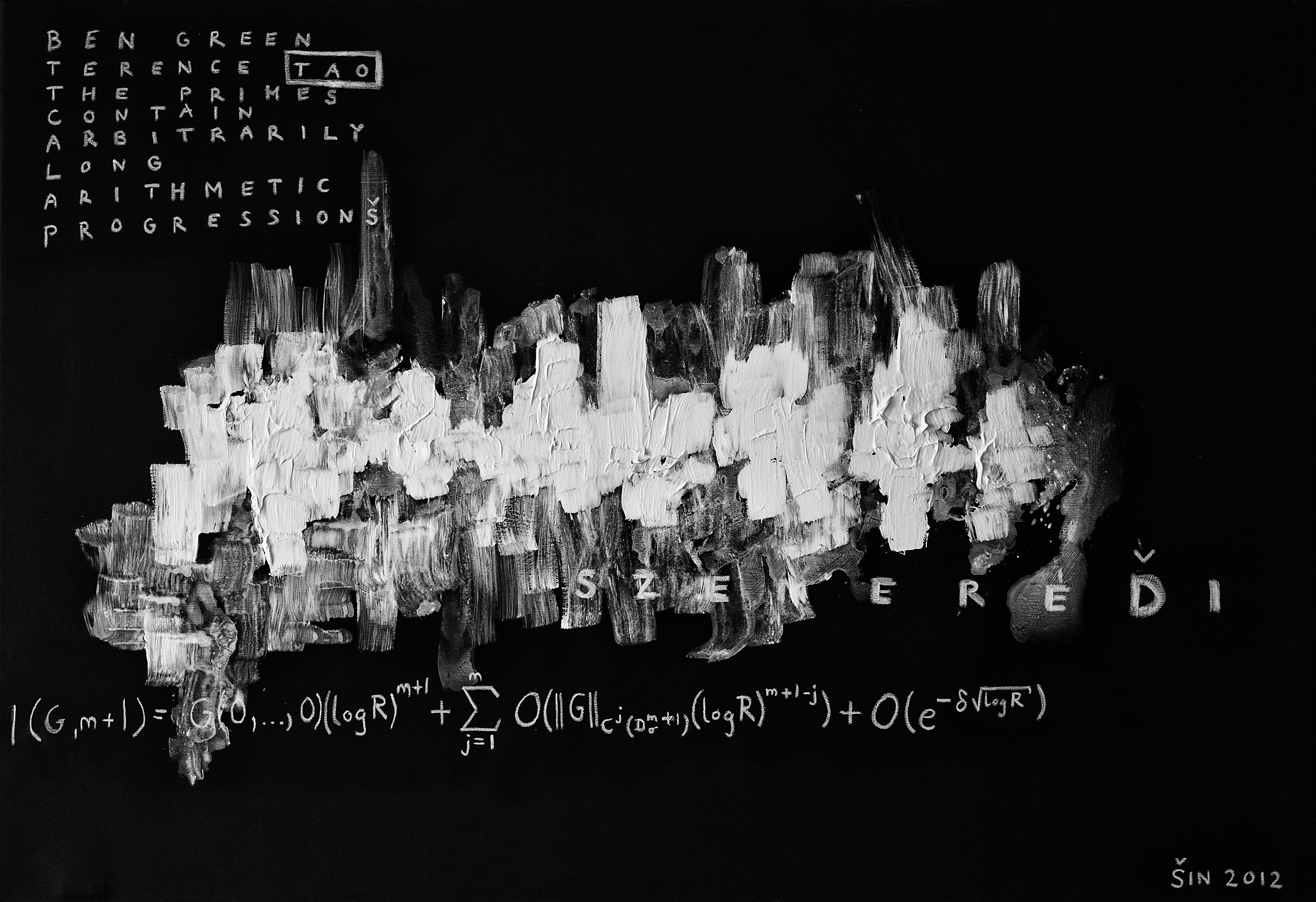

Sin's work is in private and public collections such as MODESSQE (Poland).

== Illustrations ==
- 2013 April, October Guitar Connoisseur (New York, USA) / covers
- 2013 September Endre Dicsőfi: Nyitnikék (HU) / cover, illustrations
- 2013 October Korunk (Cluj-Napoca, Romania) / cover, illustrations
