= European Trade Union Institute =

Belgium-based research institute

ETUI
- European Trade Union Institute
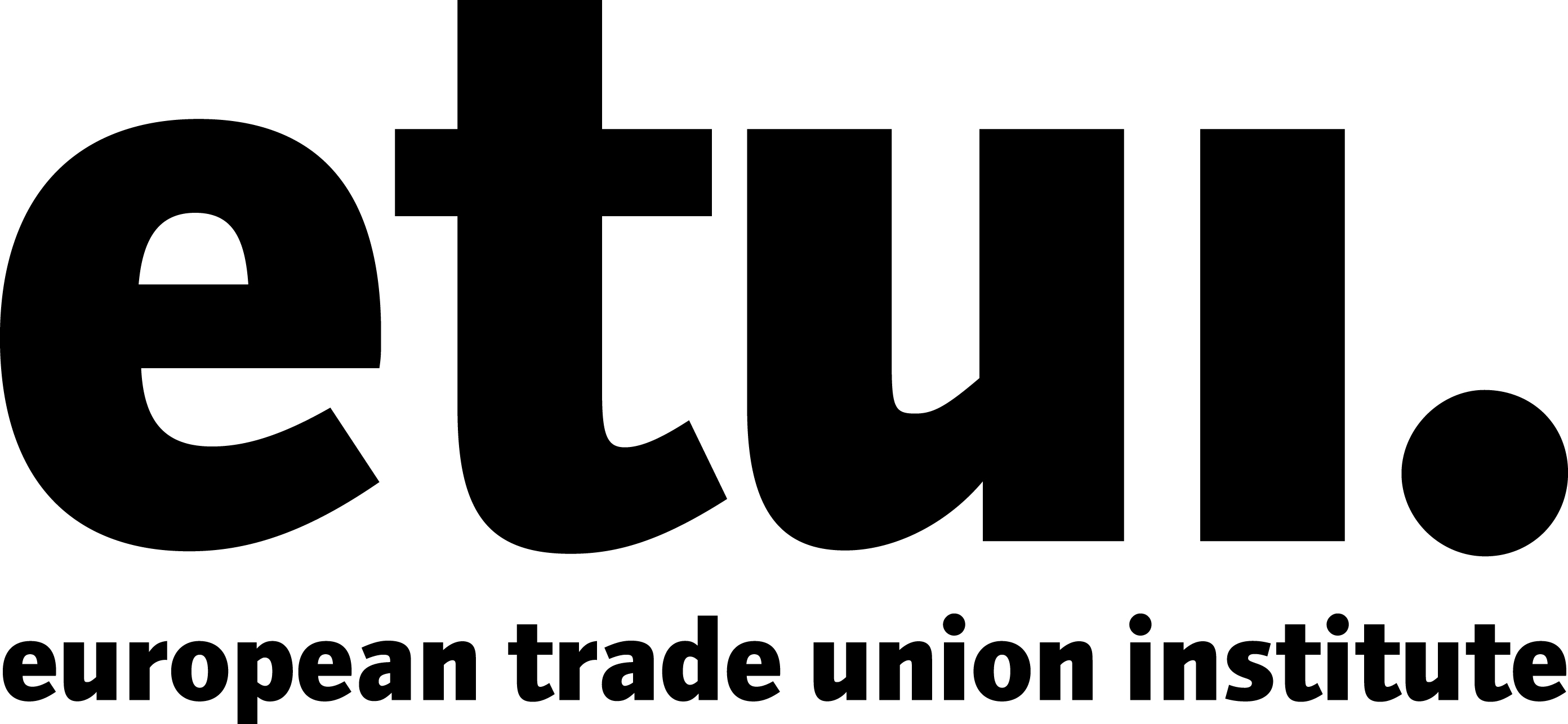
- Founded: 2005
- Headquarters: Brussels, Belgium
- Location: European Union
- Employees: 70 people
- Website: www.etui.org

The European Trade Union Institute (ETUI) is the independent research and training centre of the European Trade Union Confederation (ETUC). Its mission is to support, strengthen, and stimulate the European trade union movement by building bridges between research and labor.

The ETUI was formed in 2005 through the merger of three specialist bodies: the European Trade Union Institute, the European Trade Union College, and the Trade Union Technical Bureau. It employs a multinational team of around 60 staff members and receives financial support from the European Union.

== Research ==
The ETUI is recognised as a centre of excellence in several areas of research such as European industrial relations (including European Works Council, worker participation, European social dialogue, etc.) and working conditions (health and safety, exposure to dangerous substances – REACH, etc.).

The research department consists of three subject units:

- Europeanisation of industrial relations
- Economic, employment and social policies
- Working conditions, health and safety

Every year the ETUI, publishes Benchmarking Working Europe, the ETUI's annual stock-take of macro-economic, social and bargaining conditions in Europe.

=== Periodicals ===
- Transfer: European Review of Labour and Research is a quarterly peer-reviewed academic journal that covers the field of management studies. It is published by SAGE Publications on behalf of the European Trade Union Institute.
- SEER Journal for Labour and Social Affairs in Eastern Europe: SEER, the Journal for Labour and Social Affairs in Eastern Europe, is published for the European Trade Union Institute by Nomos, Germany.
- HesaMag: HesaMag is a bi-annual magazine all about health and safety at work, published in English and French since 2009.

== Education ==
Previously European Trade Union College, the Education Department of the ETUI provides training and learning activities for trade union officials and leaders, shop stewards, young officers, and unionists.

The department delivers about 100 courses a year to more than 2000 participants. Trade unionist's members of the ETUC, or European Works' Councils, SE works council and special negotiation bodies (such as company level employee representatives) can participate in the training.

== Notable people ==
Notable people associated with ETUI include Jane Parker, New Zealand professor of employment relations, and senior researcher at ETUI.
