= 1674 derecho =

Devastating storm in Western Europe

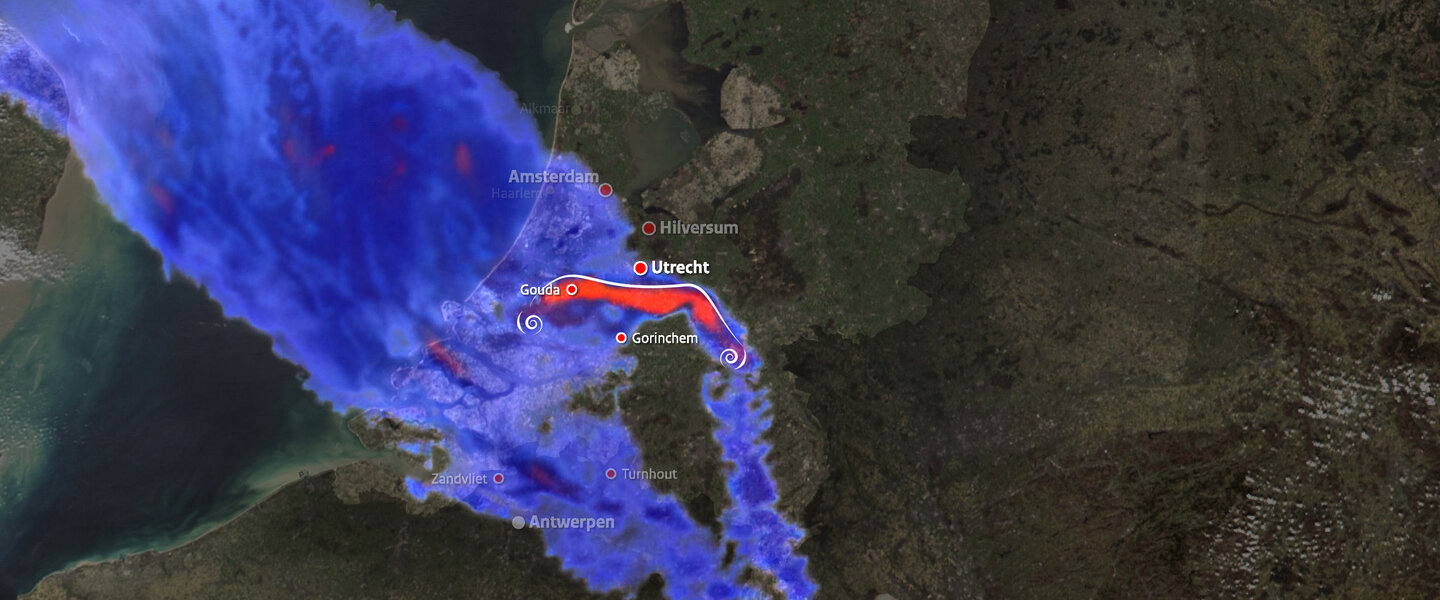
- Radar simulations of the 1674 derecho.
- Date(s): August 1, 1674; 352 years ago
- Peak wind gust (est.): 123–201.3 mph (198–324 km/h; 55.0–90.0 m/s) (Utrecht, Netherlands)
- Largest hail: 5.9–7.9 in (15–20 cm) (Northern France)
- Fatalities: 1,050+
- Areas affected: France, Belgium, Netherlands, Germany

The 1674 derecho, also known as Het Schrickelik Tempeest (English: The Terrible Tempest) in the Netherlands, was an extraordinarily powerful, extremely destructive, and deadly derecho that devastated parts of Western Europe on August 1, 1674. In some parts of the Netherlands, the derecho happened on July 22, as the Gregorian calendar was not used in the whole country yet. The return period of the derecho was estimated to be between 1,000 and 10,000 years, based on the reported hail in Northern France.

Hail stones up to 15–20 cm (5.9–7.9 in) were observed in Northern France, which were one of the largest hail stones ever observed. After moving through France and nowadays Belgium, the derecho attained its peak intensity over the Netherlands with the highest winds occurring in the province of Utrecht with estimated winds of 198–325 km/h (123–202 mph) in the city of Utrecht. The recovery of Utrecht took over a century and the nave of the Dom cathedral was never rebuilt.

The derecho caused over 1,050 deaths in the Netherlands, making it one of the deadliest weather events of the past centuries in the Netherlands. The 1674 derecho was the deadliest and most intense derecho in recorded history.

== Meteorological background ==
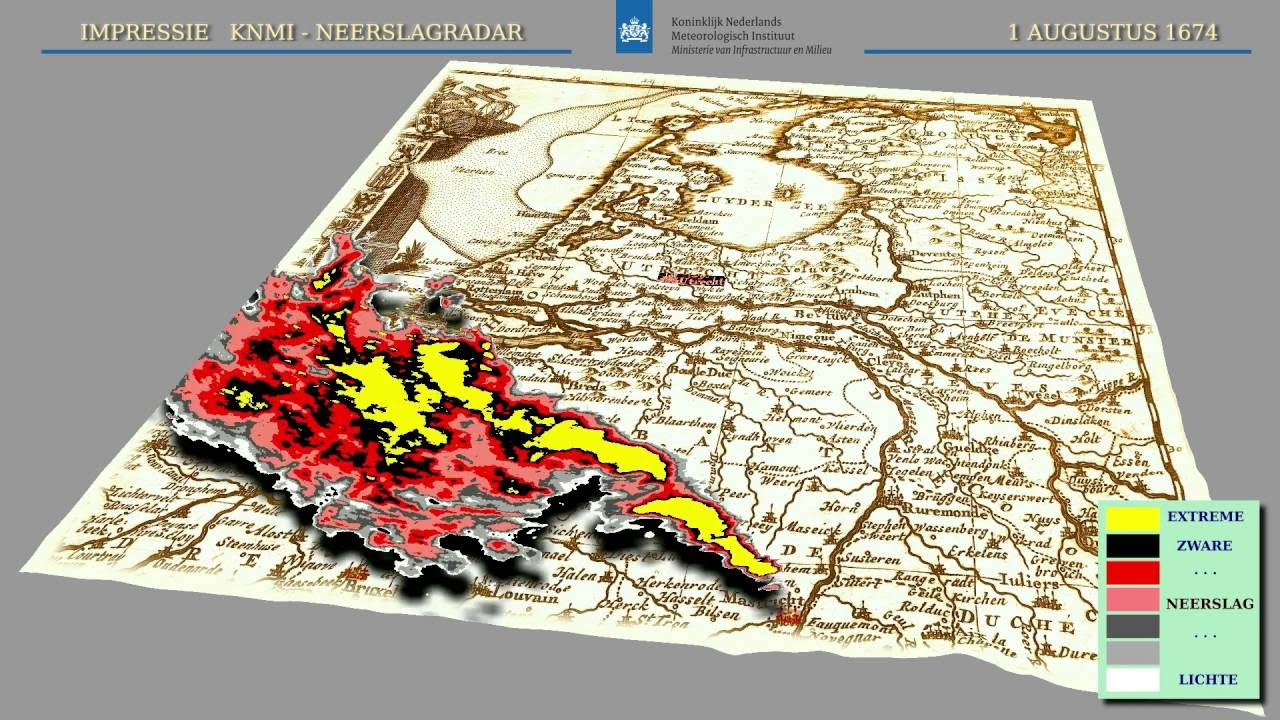
Precipitation intensity radar simulations over Belgium of August 1, 1674.

August 1, 1674 was a very hot and humid day in the Netherlands. In the evening of August 1, an exceptionally active cold front was responsible for causing a fast-moving derecho with an average propagation speed of 60–80 km/h (37–50 mph). The passage of the derecho was noted as far east as Hamburg. Within the derecho, embedded bow echoes occurred. Above the province of Utrecht, the derecho reached its peak intensity around 8 PM, with estimated maximum wind gusts of 198–325 km/h (123–202 mph) based on the amount of damage caused to homes. While the majority of the damage was caused by straight-line winds, embedded vortices weren't ruled out. A rapid change of the wind direction was observed in Medemblik, which might have been related to the passage of a thermal low. The derecho lasted for around half an hour in the municipality of Utrecht, according to observations.

In Northern France, hail stones of 15–20 cm (5.9–7.9 in) were observed, which were one of the largest hail stones ever observed on Earth. Hail stones "as large as a baby's head" were observed in Strasbourg. In Germany, hail was reported to be knee deep in Frankfurt am Main.

The amount of rain that fell during the derecho was described as exceptional. Floodings of houses by rain were described in the city of Utrecht.

== Impact ==
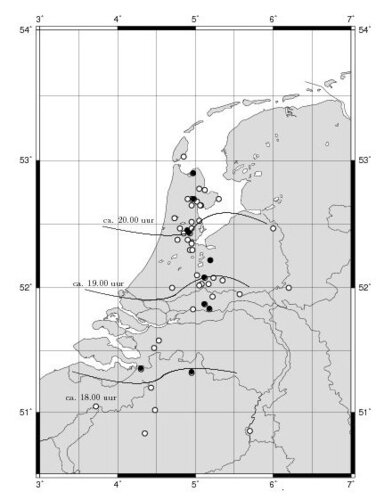
Reported cases of severe damage such as collapsed churches or large-scale destruction of homes.

=== The Netherlands ===
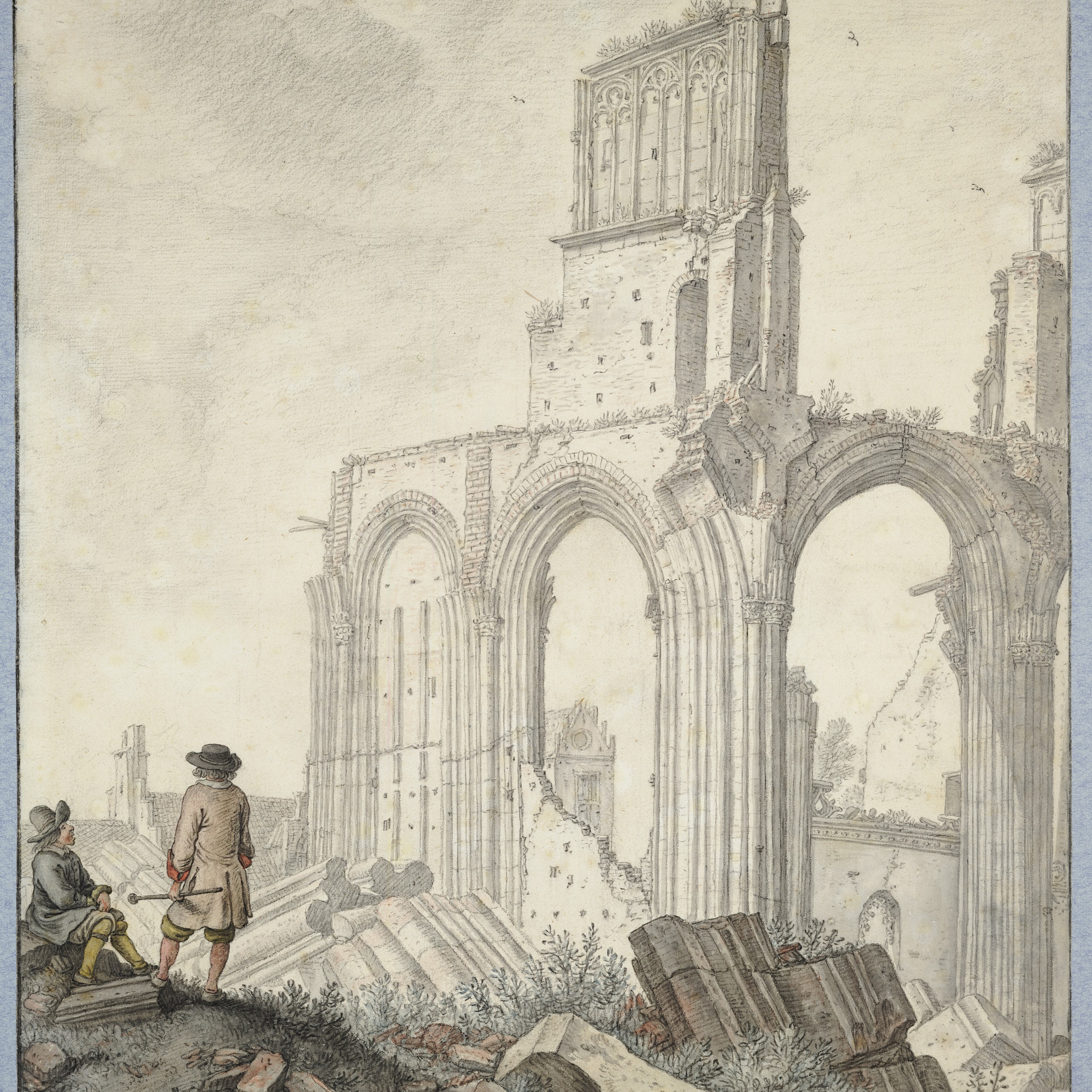
Drawing of the Dom cathedral of Utrecht after the derecho by Herman Saftleven.

The derecho caused the death of approximately 50 people in and near the city of Utrecht. Furthermore, more than 1,000 people deceased near Amsterdam. The roof of the Amsterdam's orphans house collapsed. Six windmills on the city wall of Utrecht were destroyed. A wind-powered powder mill in Monnikendam was severely damaged. Many brick houses and buildings in the city of Utrecht had collapsed walls after the derecho. Most homes in Utrecht lost their roofs. Many well-built houses were severely damaged or leveled to the ground. There were large amounts of uprooted trees. The Dom cathedral of Utrecht collapsed. The roof of the New Church of Amsterdam was severely damaged by hail. A boat flew over several fields near Ilpendam. Nearly all homes in Amsterdam were damaged by the derecho. Several windmills in Amsterdam were overturned. On the island of Texel, the derecho drove many ships to the beach or were sunk. More than 50 houses in Hilversum were leveled to the ground and many deaths were reported. The church towers of Vleuten, Jutphaas, Bunnik, Houten, and IJsselstein were destroyed. Several churches in the city of Utrecht were damaged. Multiple ships in the province of Noord-Holland did not survive the derecho.

Houses in Roosendaal, Oudenbosch, and Zandvliet were severely damaged. Many chimneys were blown off in the city of Utrecht. The recovery of Utrecht took more than a century. Farmhouses were destroyed near Utrecht. Most trees in Amsterdam fell. In the city of Amsterdam, several facades of houses collapsed and 9 ships sank. Nearly all trees at the Janskerkhof in Utrecht fell. Weeks after the derecho, the streets in Utrecht were still filled with debris. The derecho caused severe damage at a large scale to homes in Landsmeer. All homes in the city of Utrecht were damaged. 300 windows were damaged in Koog aan de Zaan. A watermill in Limburg was destroyed. Several trees were damaged in Roosendaal. A church in Zandvliet collapsed. A brewery and an inn in Utrecht were severely damaged. A fallen chimney caused damage to a blacksmith in Wezep. The derecho caused a church to collapse in Ouderkerk. Severe damage was registered in the Diemermeer. 22 mills were destroyed near Amsterdam. The Haarlemmerpoort (Haarlem Gate) in Amsterdam collapsed. An unprecedented amount of roof tiles were blown off in Amsterdam. The city hall of Amsterdam experienced severe damage to its windows. A heavy tree flew over 50 meters through the air. A mill collapsed in Zaandam. Many houses in Purmerend were destroyed by the derecho. A tower in Purmerend collapsed. Several houses and trees were damaged in the Beemster. A church in Wieringen collapsed. 200 homes in Kwadijk were severely damaged, some of them were completely destroyed. A farm in Houten was damaged by the derecho. The Agnieten monastery in Utrecht was heavily damaged. Between Amsterdam and Arnhem, only one church tower was not damaged. Church towers in Rhenen were damaged. The city of Gouda also reported damage. Out of the 36 towers in Utrecht, only five did not collapse. A mill in De Bilt collapsed and the roof of a church in Benschop was destroyed.

=== France ===
Damage was reported in Fontainebleau and Strasbourg. The hail and powerful winds caused severe damage to grain fields, grapes, and orchards. The Royal Palace of Fontainebleau was severely damaged. Hurricane-force winds were observed in the commune of Brie.

=== Belgium ===
Damage was reported in Brussels, Mechelen, Antwerpen, and Turnhout. The bridge in Antwerp was destroyed by the derecho. Many trees in Brussels fell and many facades of homes were damaged. Many homes in Turnhout were destroyed by the derecho.
