= Adam Saks =

Danish painter (born 1974)

Adam Saks (born 1974 in Copenhagen) is a Danish painter who lives and works in Berlin.

== Biography ==
Adam Saks studied at the Royal Danish Academy of Fine Arts in Copenhagen from 1993 to 1999. In 1996–1997 he studied under Professor Bernd Koberling at the Hochschule der Künste in Berlin.

Adam Saks is a painter, draftsman, watercolorist, in short, an inventor of images and besides that, a protagonist of his generation in Scandinavia. In his paintings, figures, plants, symbols or writing appear, only to vanish in amorphous color or unbound surface-ornaments, in the next blink of an eye – just as the becoming and passing away of nature. Yet, compared to the Vanitas of human existence or a baroque memento mori, Adam Saks reveals an encouraging confirmation of life. His pictures are situated in a state of constant transformation, they bundle and unfold an immense swirl of impressions, memories, emotions and moods. A life in color which occasionally loses itself and regains itself at another place as seen in the exhibition Inhaling Darkness Exhaling Galaxies at Kunstverein Reutlingen (Germany 2017)

In 2011 and 2012 Adam Saks devoted himself extensively to examining the relationship between human beings and nature, or the human figure as an integral part of the organic cycle of life. Multiple influences flow together in Adam Saks's paintings and paperworks. He lets himself drift through travel narratives; directly into the horror of plundering, pillaging and colonialism with its solitude and aggression (e.g. the French Foreign Legion); through compendiums of heraldry and emblemata; and out of cheap comics or tattoo magazines – seafarer's or criminal tattoos as traces of human presence.

Adam Saks has created several artist books with Schaefer Grafisk Vaerksted, Copenhagen. Among them Deep Drawings (2004), Raid (2004) and Fill Your Hands (2007) are made in the monochrome technique of direct transfer in a limited edition of 250 copies each. Elephant Island (2009) is a facsimile of a large ink drawing which – like James Joyce's ulyssian stream of consciousness – waves and weaves itself as well as a massive array of motifal flotsam throughout the whole 29,7 × 630 cm long span of the book rawly bound as Japanese paperback.

Adam Saks has had numerous institutional solo exhibitions, e.g., Lieu D´art Contemporain in Narbonne (France, 2008, 2018), the Nordiska Akvarellmuseet (Sweden, 2009), the ARoS – Aarhus Kunstmuseum (Denmark, 2010), the Städtische Galerie Offenburg (Germany, 2012), Kunsthal Nord - Aalborg (Denmark, 2016), Kunstverein Reutlingen (Germany, 2017)

== Awards (selection) ==
- 2015 Kjell Nupen Memorial Grant
- 2009 Niels Wessel Bagges Art Foundation

== Biennales & Triennials (selection) ==
- 2016 International Print Biennale, Newcastle, England
- 2010 False Recognition, 14th Vilnius Painting Triennial, Vilnius, Lithuania

== Exhibitions (selection) ==
- 2020 Adam og Asger, with Asger Jorn, Galerie Moderne, Silkeborg, Denmark
- 2019 We Are The Human Waterfall, Galerie MøllerWitt, Copenhagen, Denmark
- 2018 Infinite Voyage, Galerie Forsblom; Helsinki, Finland
- 2018 Pilgrim on a Hidden Path, Meliksetian & Briggs, Los Angeles / CA, USA
- 2018 Loops of Utopia, Lieu d'Art Contemporain, Narbonne, France
- 2017 Adam Saks, Kunstverein Reutlingen, Reutlingen, Germany
- 2016 Setting Sail In A Teadrop Of Fear And Desire, Kunsthal NORD, Aalborg, Denmark
- 2015 Strange Fates Some Fruits Are Given, Galleri Møller-Witt, Aarhus, Denmark
- 2015 Adam Saks, Galleri Ismene, Trondheim, Norway
- 2014 I Am A Ghost I Am A Totem I Am A Still Life, Galerie Forsblom, Helsinki, Finland
- 2014 Adam Saks, Künstlerhaus Bethanien, Berlin, Germany
- 2014 Flora Empire, Galerie Møller Witt, Denmark
- 2013 Portrait of the Moon & a Single Blue Frog, Galerie Forsblom, Helsinki, Finland
- 2012 Ende Neu, Städtische Galerie, Offenburg, Germany
- 2012 Atropa, Bourouina Gallery, Berlin, Germany
- 2011 Follow You Follow Me, Bourouina Gallery, Berlin, Germany
- 2010 Visual Voodoo, ARoS – Aarhus Kunstmuseum, Aarhus, Denmark
- 2010 Dry your Eyes, Galleri Christoffer Egelund, Copenhagen, Denmark
- 2009 Mexican Standoff, Schaefer Grafisk Vaerksted, Copenhagen, Denmark
- 2009 Lone Star, Nordiska Akvarellmuseet, Skärhamn, Sweden
- 2009 Sacré Nom de Dieu, Bourouina Gallery, Berlin, Germany
- 2008 Victime de sa Force, L.A.C, Narbonne, France
- 2007 Pazi Snajper, Galerie Kapinos, Berlin, Germany
- 2006 Transgressor, Aarhus Kunstbygning, Aarhus, Denmark
- 2006 Marion, Nur Für Dich, Schaefer Grafisk Vaerksted, Copenhagen, Denmark

== Group exhibitions (selection) ==
- 2020 Explorations, Turku Art Museum, Turku, Finland
- 2020 Bed and Clock, Moon and Beach: Edvard Munch, Galerie Max Hetzler, Berlin, Germany
- 2019 Nordisk Akvareller 2019, Frederikshavn Kunstmuseum, Frederikshavn, Denmark
- 2018 Fusion, Nordiska Akvarelmuseet, Skärhamn, Sweden
- 2018 New Black Romanticism, Topičuv Salon, Prague, Czech Republic
- 2018 New Black Romanticism, Künstlerhaus Palais Thurn und Taxis, Bregenz, Austria
- 2018 New Black Romanticism, Galerie der Stadt Backnang, Germany
- 2017 Neue Schwarze Romantik, Künstlerhaus Bethanien, Berlin, Germany
- 2017 New Black Romanticism, Muzeul Național de Artă al României, Bucharest, Romania
- 2017 New Black Romanticism, Stadtgalerie Kiel, Germany
- 2017 Galleri Ismene, Trondheim, Norway
- 2016 Vitales Echo, Künstlerhaus Bethanien, Berlin, Germany
- 2016 International Print Biennale, Newcastle, UK
- 2016 Træsnit, Galerie Moderne, Silkeborg, Denmark
- 2016 Let’s Get Physical: Spatial Confrontations and Narrative Collisions, KKW, Leipzig, Germany
- 2015 Out of the Darkness, ARoS, Aarhus, Denmark
- 2015 Vattenkonst, Nordiska Akvarellmuseet, Skarham, Sweden
- 2015 Berlin Artists’ Statements, BWAContemporary Art Gallery, Katowice, Poland
- 2014 Wo ist hier? #1: Malerei und Gegenwart, Kunstverein Reutlingen, Reutlingen, Germany
- 2014 Luggage and Observations, Galerie Klaus Gerrit Friese, Stuttgart, Germany
- 2014 Cap Jorn, Galerie Moderne, Silkeborg, Denmark
- 2013 Under Pressure, Stolper & Friends, Oslo, Norway
- 2013 Moraltarantula 6, Hamburg, Germany
- 2012 Flying, Künstlerhaus Bethanien, Berlin, Germany
- 2012 Charade, Sammlung Haubrok, Berlin, Germany
- 2012 Light & Space, Nordiska Akvarellmuseet, Sweden
- 2012 Status Berlin (1), Künstlerhaus Bethanien, Berlin, Germany
- 2012 Merchandizing, Wonderloch Kellerland, Berlin, Germany
- 2010 New Impressions, Bourouina Gallery, Berlin, Germany

== Public Collections (selection) ==
- Kiasma (Finland)
- EMMA – Espoo Museum of Modern Art (Finland)
- ARoS Aarhus Kunstmuseum (Denmark)
- Kunsten – Museum of Modern Art, Aalborg (Denmark)
- LAC – Lieu d’Art Contemporain, Narbonne (France)
- Malmø Kunstmuseum, Malmø (Sweden)
- Nordiska Akvarellmuseet, Skärhamn (Sweden)
- Sønderjyllands Kunstmuseum, Tønder (Denmark)
- Statens Kunstfond, Copenhagen (Denmark)
- Statens Museum for Kunst, Copenhagen (Denmark)

== Artist Books(selection) ==
- Lubok no. 8, Lubok Verlag Leipzig, 2013
- Night Stalker, artist book, edited by Dorothee Heine and Christian Malycha, Q1, Berlin, 2011
- Elephant Island, artist book, Schäfer Grafisk Værksted, text by Christian Malycha, Kerber Verlag, Bielefeld 2009
- Fill Your Hands, artist book, Schäfer Grafisk Værksted, Copenhagen 2007
- Raid, artist book, Schäfer Grafisk Værksted, Copenhagen 2005
- Re-Raid, artist book, Schäfer Grafisk Værksted, Copenhagen 2005
- Deep Drawings, artist book, Schäfer Grafisk Værksted, Copenhagen 2004

== Solo Publications (selection) ==
- Flora Empire, Seven Etchings, Atelier Larsen, Helsingborg, 2013
- Portrait of the Moon & a Single Blue Frog, Galerie Forsblom, text: Leevi Haapala, 2013
- Atropa, Gallery Bourouina, tekst: Christoph Tannert, 2012
- Ende Neu, catalogue edited by Städtische Galerie Offenburg, texts by Gerlinde Brandenburger-Eisele, Christian Malycha and Roberto Ohrt, Offenburg, 2012
- Follow You Follow Me, catalogue edited by Bourouina Gallery, interview with Adam Saks by David Ulrichs, Berlin, 2011
- Nausikaa, catalogue edited by Dorothee Heine and Christian Malycha, Q.H.S.O.I.Q.O.C.M.S. 4, Berlin 2010
- Visual Voodoo, catalogue edited by ARoS – Aarhus Kunstmuseum, texts by Marie Nipper and Jens Erik Sørensen, Aarhus 2010
- Dry your Eyes, catalogue edited by Galleri Christoffer Egelund, text by Tine Nygaard, Copenhagen 2010
- Sea Level – Sailors and Prisoners. Coloured Pencil Drawings, edited by Josef Kleinheinrich, text by Kay Heymer, Buchkunst Kleinheinrich, Münster 2009
- Lonestar, catalogue edited by the Nordiska Akvarellmuseet, texts by Bernd Koberling, Bera Nordal and Björn Springfeldt, Skärhamn, 2009
- Sacré Nom de Dieu!, catalogue edited by Bourouina Gallery, text by Christian Malycha, Berlin, 2009
- Victime de Sa Force, catalogue edited by Lieu D´art Contemporain, text by Thorsten Sadowsky, Narbonne 2008
- Transgressor, catalogue edited by Galleri Veggerby, Copenhagen 2006
- Fatalité, catalogue edited by Vikingsberg Kunsthal, text by Björn Springfeldt, Helsingborg 2005
- Machete, catalogue edited by Sønderjyllands Kunstmuseum, text by Thorsten Sadowsky, Tønder 2003
