= Manhattan Transfer =

Manhattan Transfer may refer to:

- Manhattan Transfer station, a Pennsylvania Railroad station in New Jersey
- Manhattan Transfer (novel), a 1925 novel by John Dos Passos
- "Manhattan Transfer", 1984 episode of Right to Reply
- Manhattan Transfer, a 1993 science fiction novel by John E. Stith
- Manhattan transfer, a description of Doctor Manhattan's teleportation in Watchmen
- The Manhattan Transfer, jazz and pop vocal quartet
  - The Manhattan Transfer (album), album by the Manhattan Transfer
- Manhattan Transfer, the ability or "Stand" of Johngalli A., a character in the manga Stone Ocean
