= Fibenare Guitars Co. =

- Company type: Musical instruments
- Founded: 1998
- Headquarters: Budapest, Hungary
- Area served: Global
- Website: http://www.fibenare-guitars.com

Fibenare Guitars (fIbena:re, FIY-BEH-NAH-REH) is a Hungarian guitar manufacturing company established in 1998.
