= Richard Sedlon =

American artist (1900-1992)

Richard Sedloň
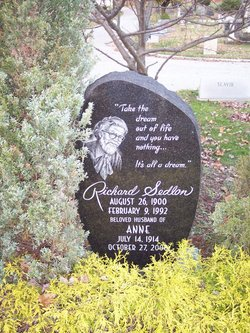
- Born: August 26, 1900; Philadelphia, United States
- Died: February 9, 1992 (aged 91); Bedford, Ohio, United States
- Occupations: Painter, Lithographer
- Spouse: Anne Nyerges
- Children: None
- Parent(s): Vincent and Hortense Sedlon

Richard Sedlon (1900–1992) was an American painter from Bedford, Ohio.

== Life ==
Richard Carl Sedlon was born on August 26, 1900, in the bohemian section of Philadelphia, Pennsylvania. The second son of Vincent and Hortense Sedlon, Richard found his artistic calling early in life and by eighteen was already a journeyman lithographer with Morgan Lithography in Cleveland, Ohio. Sedlon was also a professional artist who dabbled in carvings, oil paintings and sketches. He was locally renowned and lived in Bedford, Ohio in the Hezekiah Dunham House with his wife Anne Nyerges, until his death on 9 February 1992. He is buried in Bedford, Ohio.

== Photo gallery ==
Young Richard and his father, Vincenc Sedloň

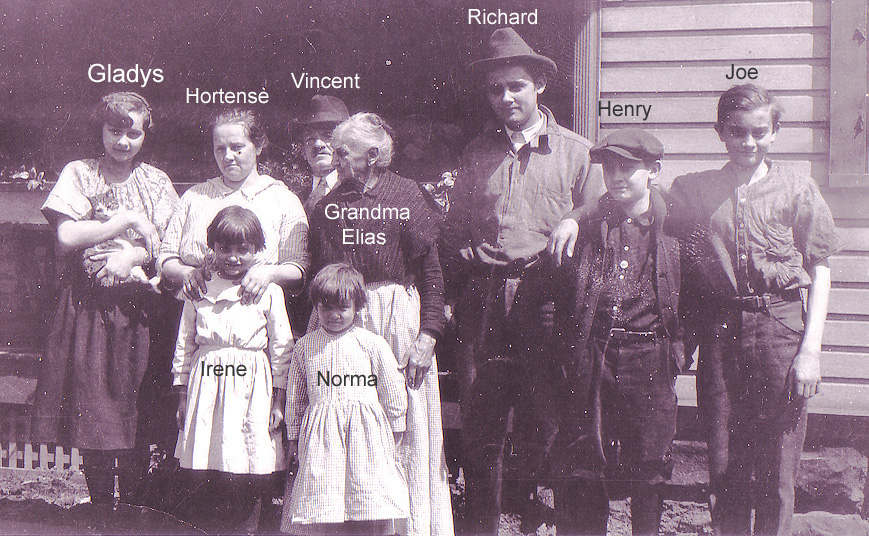
Young Richard, his parents, and his siblings (early 1900s)

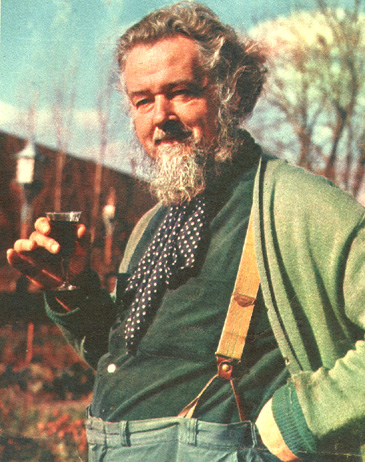
And older Richard Sedlon at his home in Bedford, Ohio

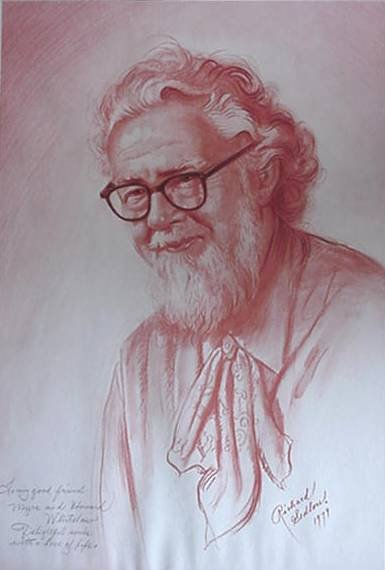
Self-portrait of Richard

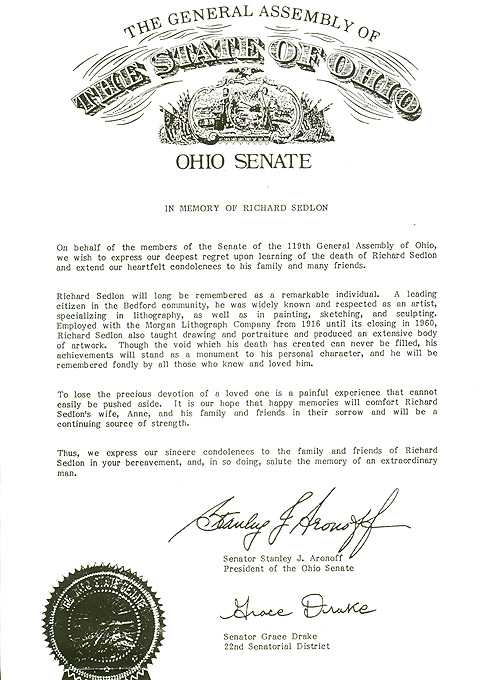
Condolence memo to Richard's family from the Ohio Senate
