= Transfer (journal) =

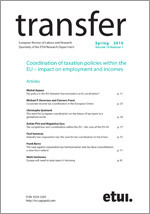
- Discipline: Management
- Language: English
- Edited by: Maria Jepsen

Publication details
- History: 1995-present
- Publisher: SAGE Publications on behalf of the European Trade Union Institute
- Frequency: Quarterly

Standard abbreviations
- ISO 4: Transfer

Indexing
- ISSN: 1024-2589 (print); 1996-7284 (web)
- LCCN: 95641011
- OCLC no.: 33224050

Links
- Journal homepage; Online access; Online archive

Transfer: European Review of Labour and Research is a quarterly peer-reviewed academic journal that covers the field of management studies. The journal's editor-in-chief is Maria Jepsen (European Trade Union Institute). It was established in 1995 and is currently published by SAGE Publications on behalf of the European Trade Union Institute.

== Abstracting and indexing ==
Transfer is abstracted and indexed in:

- Business Source Corporate
- Current Contents/ Social and Behavioral Sciences
- Human Resources Abstracts
- Scopus
- Social Sciences Citation Index
