= Roger Swainston =

Australian fish illustrator (born 1960)

- Born: Roger Anthony Swainston; 7 May 1960; North Cotswold, Gloucestershire, UK
- Known for: Painting, Drawing, Illustration, Zoology, Naturalism

Roger Anthony Swainston (born 7 May 1960, in North Cotswold, Gloucestershire, UK) is an Australian painter, naturalist and zoologist. He is one of the most recognised artists of the underwater world.

== Biography ==
Swainston was raised in Yealering in the Western Australian outback surrounded by wildlife. The unique Australian flora and fauna fascinated and inspired him from an early age and he has drawn and painted it since childhood. In the late 1970s he travelled and worked around the north coast of Australia on fishing trawlers. The endless variety of undersea life he encountered in their nets encouraged him to undertake further studies and he graduated from the University of Western Australia with a degree in Zoology in 1981. His art is self taught. "I've always drawn, even when I was really small. I wanted to be a natural history illustrator."

He then worked in the fish department of the Western Australian Museum and took part in a variety of scientific expeditions. These included surveying the fish fauna of Western Australia's south coast with the Museum, the deepwater fauna off the northwest shelf with CSIRO and the reef fauna of Papua New Guinea with CRI. During this period he also illustrated numerous guidebooks on the identification of fish and other marine life and worked with scientific institutions around the world such as the Smithsonian Institution, United Nations FAO, CSIRO and many museums and government departments concerned with the marine environment.

In 1990 he moved to France and spent several years working from a studio in Paris, where he further diversified and developed his work. Illustrations from this period are held by the Musée National des Arts et Traditions Populaires and the Ministry of the Environment. He is presently the official artist for the Conseil Superieur de la Peche in France. Whilst continuing to provide illustrations for a wide range of clients he began to work on methods of capturing the complexity of marine environments. This led to a documentary being made on Swainston's project, to draw underwater a reef in the Red Sea.

Upon Swainston's return to Australia in 1996 he continued this work on marine environments. His focus became the integration of science and art in a manner that fostered both an appreciation of the extraordinary beauty of the subject and an understanding of its diversity and complexity.

In 1999 he held successful solo exhibitions of his work in Sydney and Fremantle and has since held other successful exhibitions in France, USA and Australia. As a conservationist, Swainston has supported ecological projects and research, he works closely with conservation organizations to help protect fishery resources and increase knowledge of marine life.

In recent years Swainston has continued the study of the marine environment with large scale underwater drawings and surveys of reef sites around the world. He developed a method of drawing underwater making raw graphite drawings which are later shaded and drawn aided by photographs. He has pursued scientific illustration with life-size portraits of individual fish, intimate studies of their surface, form and function. His 6000 paintings have illustrated 26 books.

He is a supporter of Ocean Art Alliance with other renown marine artists who are, "united by a passionate love of the sea and a desire to contribute to education programs that promote ocean conservation."

In August 2016 Australia Post issued a set of four stamps of Christmas Island Shells by Swainston.

Swainston and his partner Catherine own and operate ANIMA (established 1993) an image bank of marine animals. It contains "over 3000 individual portraits of fishes, crustaceans, molluscs and a wide range of other animals."

== Private life ==
Swainston lives and works in Fremantle, Western Australia, with his partner Catherine Julien and their three children. He has remained largely unknown in Australia though he is highly regarded in France where four documentaries have been produced about his work.

== Projects ==
=== Biodiversity ===
==== Clipperton Island ====
In 2005 Swainston spent two months on Clipperton Island in the eastern Pacific to draw the fauna and flora of this isolated and deserted atoll. As the artist for the French scientific expedition surveying the atoll, he was commissioned by the Foundation Gaz de France to create five paintings of Clipperton Island.

==== Ningaloo Reefs ====
He also has an ongoing project to survey a range of environments along the Ningaloo Reef and capture them as panoramic underwater scenes, containing all the abundance and diversity to be found there. These will serve as both inspiring works of art and educational tools to help the understanding and preservation of these ecosystems. It is a 20-year project and 2017 is the fifteenth year.

==== Vanuatu - Espiritu Santo Island ====
In 2006, invited by the Museum of Natural History of Paris, Pro-Natura Int. and Agence Rapho, he spent 2 months on the island of Espiritu Santo, Vanuatu to draw an underwater reef portrait as well as a variety of marine species and the flora and fauna of the untouched rainforest. In March 2007 a Progress Report of the Santo 2006 Expedition was published.

=== Endeavour Panels ===
Under a commission by the Department of Education of Western Australia in 1999, he produced a detailed 7.2m X 1.5m panel of life on Western Australian coastal reefs as a Public Art Project for the students of Endeavour Primary School.

=== Hillarys Artworks ===
In 2004 he was commissioned through the Percent for Art scheme to prepare a number of large panels to be installed in a new Research and Education facility for the WA Fisheries Department. These works use new techniques and materials, such as reflective pigments. They represent a distillation of his many years of experience with marine life to create evocative mural-sized panels with hidden layers of meaning and ever-changing intriguing surfaces.

=== Red Sea Reef ===
In 1995 A French documentary team enabled Swainston to embark on a project that had occupied his thoughts for many years, to draw his underwater subjects from life. During a voyage to Yemen on the Arabian Peninsula he executed the first of his large scale panoramic drawings of the coral reef, which formed the basis of a half-hour documentary "[Peintre sous la Mer] (Segment Productions).

=== TV documentaries and reports ===
- 1988 – ABC (Australia) Swainston's work on sharks with CSIRO
- 1995 – FR3 (France) The illustrative work of Roger Swainston
- 1997 – Arte/La Cinq (France) a 50-minute documentary on Swainston's creation of an underwater drawing of a reef in the Red Sea.
- 2002 – ABC (Australia, 7.30 Report) Swainston working on the Ningaloo Reef
- 2004 – TV documentary Thalassa (France) in Coral Bay
- 2005 – TV documentary CANAL+ (France) on Clipperton Island expedition with Swainston mandated by the French government.
- 2006 – TV documentary for Thalassa (France) from Vanuatu - Espiritu Santo Island
- 2017 – ABC (Australia) Roger Swainston : Drawn to water (11 April 2017)
- 2017 – ABC (Australia) Creatives : Roger Swainston (16 April 2017)

=== Books illustrated ===
Books are able to be searched at Trove or National Library of Australia although not all list Roger Swainston among authors.

- 1985 – F.E.Wells and C.W.Bryce, Seashells of Western Australia, (ISBN 0730900770) Western Australia Museum, 207 p.
- 1985 – Gerald R. Allen, FAO Species Catalogue Volume 6, Snappers of the World, (ISBN 92-5-102321-2) FAO, 208 p.
- 1986 /89/92 – Woodside's Guide to Fishing on the Dampier Archipelago Volumes I - II - III, Woodside Offshore Petroleum Pty. Ltd., each vol. 80 p.
- 1986 – Barry Hutchins and Roger Swainston, Sea fishes of southern Australia: complete field guide for anglers and divers (ISBN 1862526613) Swainston Publishing, 180 p.
- 1987 – Coral reefs of Western Australia, Environmental Protection Authority Bulletin 285, (ISBN 073091660X) 18p.
- 1988 – Gerald R. Allen and Roger Swainston, The marine fishes of north-western Australia: a field guide for anglers and divers, (ISBN 0730921131) Western Australia Museum, 201 p.
- 1988 – Barbra Blomberg, Seafood Tasmania cookbook , (ISBN 0724616322) Department of Sea Fisheries Tasmania, 144 pages.
- 1988 – Gerald R. Allen and R.C. Steene, Fishes of Christmas Island, Indian Ocean, (ISBN 0959121013) Christmas Island Natural History Association, 197 p.
- 1989 – Kent E. Carpenter and Gerald R. Allen, FAO species catalogue, Volume 9, Emperor Fishes and Large Eyed Breams of the World, (ISBN 92-5-102889-3) FAO, 118 p.
- 1990 – Dr Gerald R. Allen and R.C. Steene, Fishes of the Great Barrier Reef and the Coral Sea, (ISBN 1863330127) Crawford House Press, 507 p.
- 1990 – V. Wadley, Squid from the West and North West Slope deepwater trawl fisheries of Western Australia, CSIRO Marine Laboratories, 12 leaves
- 1991 – Gerald R. Allen, Damselfishes of the world, (ISBN 3882440082) Mergus Press, 271 p.
- 1992 – Gerald R. Allen and Roger Swainston, Reef fishes of New Guinea: a field guide for divers, anglers and naturalists, (ISBN 998099990X) Christensen Research Institute, 132 p.
- 1993 – Gerald R. Allen, Field guide to the freshwater fishes of New Guinea, (ISBN 9980853042) Christensen Research Institute, 268 p.
- 1993 – P.J. Kailola et al., Australian fisheries resources, (ISBN 0642188769) Bureau of Resource Sciences Aust., 422 p
- 1994 – Peter Last and John Stephens, Sharks and rays of Australia, (ISBN 0643051430) Commonwealth Scientific and Industrial Research Organisation, 593 p.
- 1994 – Dr Gerald R.Allen - D.R Robertson Fishes of the tropical eastern Pacific, (ISBN 0824816757) Crawford House Press, 332 p.
- 1995 – J.Ross editor, Fish Australia, (ISBN 0670860409) Cartography Penguin - - 498 p.
- 1995 – John E. Randall, Coastal fishes of Oman (ISBN 0824818083) Crawford House Press, 439 p.
- 1995 – J.C. Chantelat, La pêche - Guide Vert, (ISBN 9782263030857 ) Edition SOLAR - France, 368 p.
- 1997 – R.T. Leighton and all, Sharks and Rays, (ISBN 0783549407) Time-Life Education, 288 p.
- 1997 – Gerald R. Allen; illustrations by Roger Swainston and Jill Ruse Marine fishes of tropical Australia and South-East Asia, (ISBN 0730987515) Western Australian Museum, 292 p Later editions called Field Guide to Marine Fishes of Tropical Australia and South-East Asia
- 1997 – D.Fauntain and Gerald R.Allen, Anemonefishes and their host sea anemones: a guide for aquarists and divers, (ISBN 0730983927) West. Australian Museum, 160 p.
- 1998 – V. Wadley and M. Dunning, illustrations by Roger Swainston and Georgia Davis, Cephalopods of commercial importance in Australian fisheries ,(ISBN 0643061630) CSIRO 65 p.
- 1998 – M. Carwardine and all, Whales, Dolphins & Porpoises, (ISBN 078355284X) Time-Life Education, 288 p.
- 2003 – J.B.De Panafieu, Planète Eau Douce, (ISBN 2070552403) Gallimard Jeunesse, 96 p.
- 2005 – J. D. Thornton with illustrations by Steve Ferguson and R. Swainston, How to catch a fish, (ISBN 186504654X) Scholastic Australia, 86 p.
- 2005 – Roger Swainston, Claire Tice, Adam Laszczuk, Fish: an Australian angler's guide, (ISBN 0143003887) Penguin, 107 p.
- 2010 – Roger Swainston, Swainston's fishes of Australia, (ISBN 9780670071647) Viking, 821 p.
