= Cornelis Saftleven =

Dutch painter (c. 1607–1681)

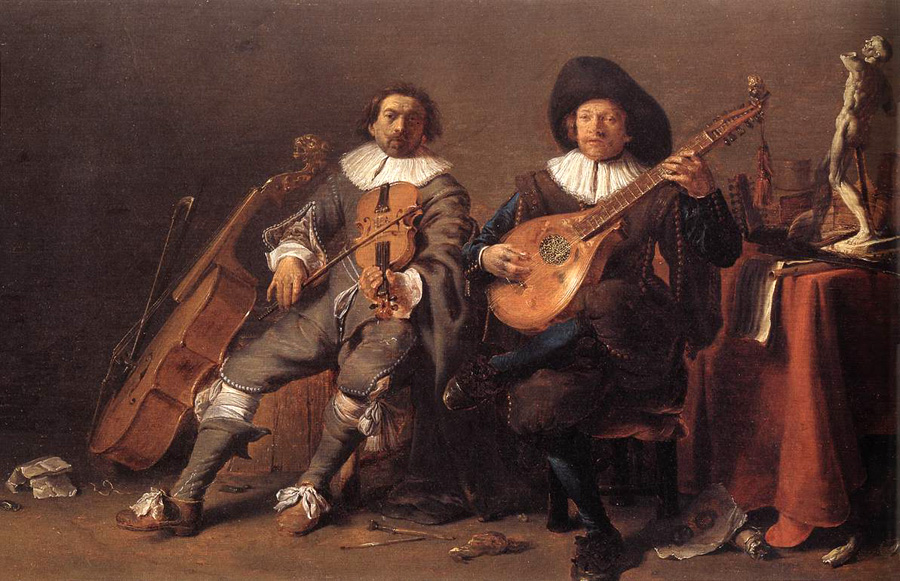
Two Musicians, 1633

Cornelis Saftleven (c. 1607 in Gorinchem – 1 June 1681 in Rotterdam) was a Dutch painter who worked in a great variety of genres. Known in particular for his rural genre scenes, his range of subjects was very wide and included portraits, farmhouse interiors, rural and beach scenes, landscapes with cattle, history paintings, scenes of Hell, allegories, satires and illustrations of proverbs.

== Life ==
Cornelis Saftleven was born into a family of artists. He learned to paint possibly from his father Herman, along with his brothers Abraham and Herman Saftleven the Younger. He lived for a time in Utrecht with his brother.

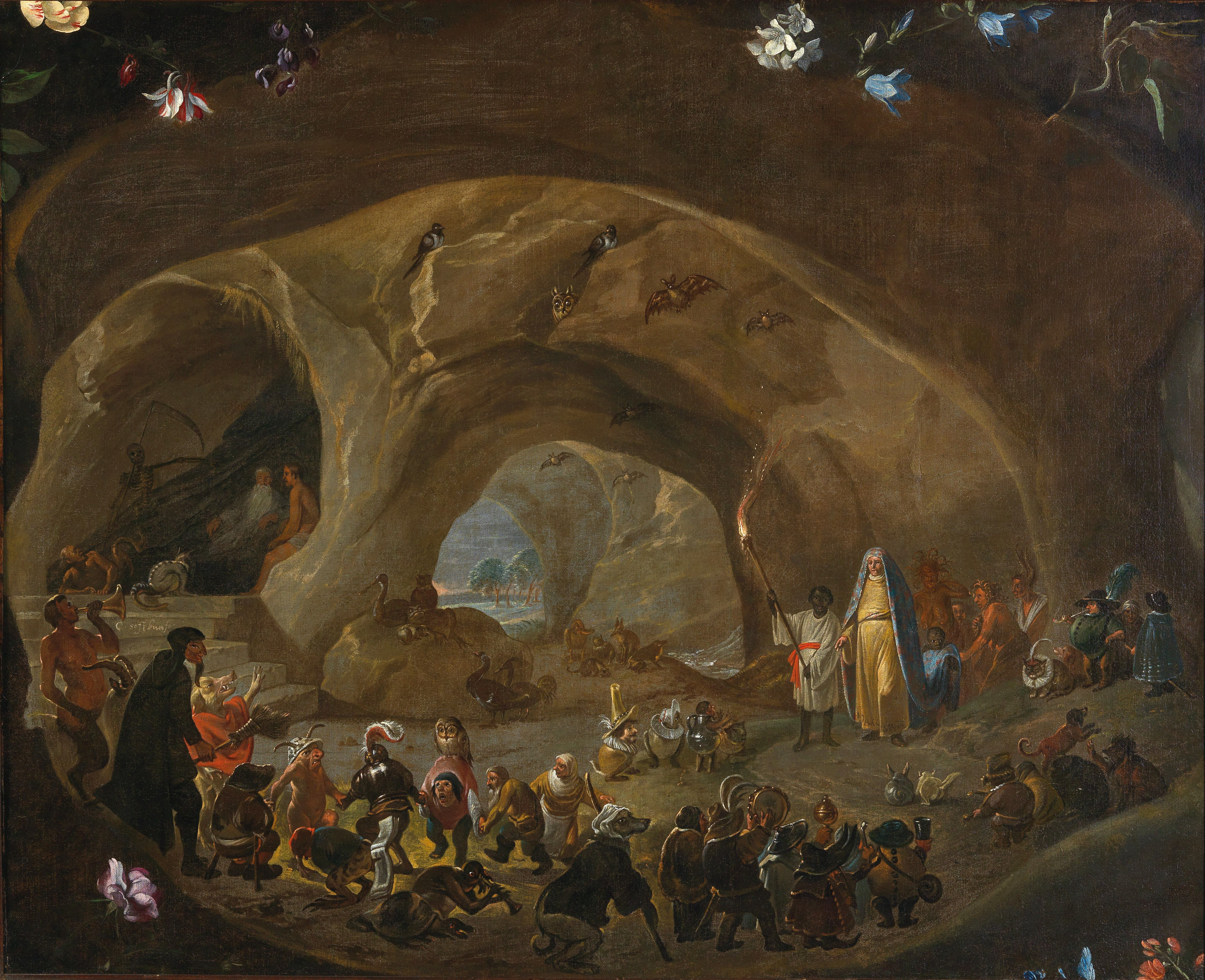
Temptation of St Anthony

After training in Rotterdam, Cornelis likely traveled to Antwerp around 1632. Peter Paul Rubens is known to have added figures in paintings of Saftleven before 1637. When Rubens died in 1640 there were eight Saftlevens in his collection, four of which with figures added by Rubens.

Among his earliest works are portraits and peasant interiors influenced by Adriaen Brouwer. By 1634 Cornelis was in Utrecht, where his brother Herman Saftleven the Younger was living. The brothers began painting stable interiors, a new subject in peasant genre painting. He also made a double-portrait of himself and his brother in the Two Musicians (c. 1633; Academy of Fine Arts Vienna).

By 1637 Cornelis had returned to Rotterdam. In 1648 he married Catharina van der Heyden, who died in 1654. The year after her death, he married Elisabeth van der Avondt. He became dean of the guild of Saint Luke of Rotterdam in 1667.

His pupils included Abraham Hondius, Ludolf de Jongh and Egbert Lievensz. van der Poel.

== Work ==
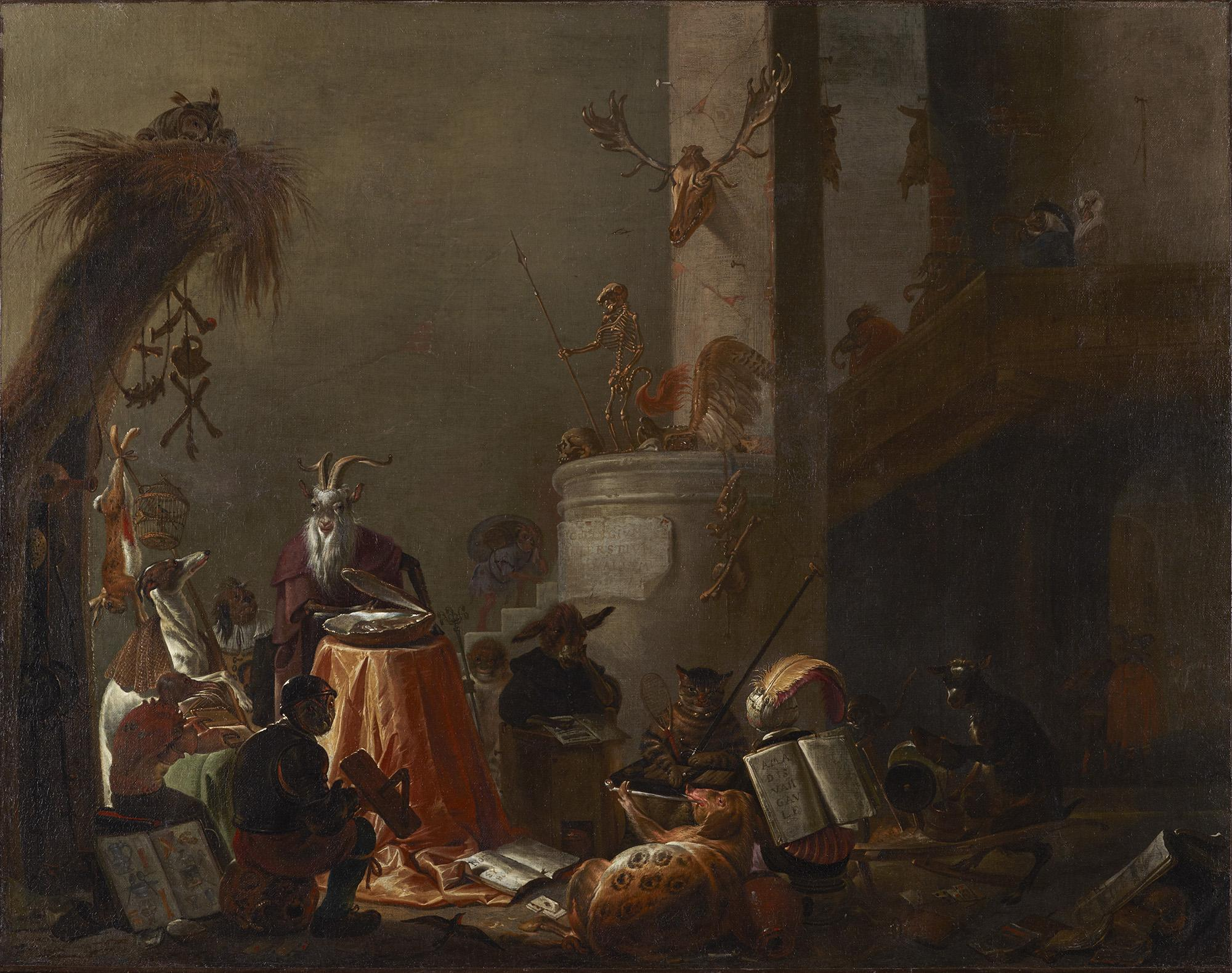
College of Animals

Approximately two hundred of Saftleven's oil paintings and five hundred of his drawings still survive. His subject matter covered various subjects, including genre works, portraits, beach scenes, and biblical and mythological themes. His images of hell as well as his satires and allegories are considered to be his most important contributions to Dutch painting. Related in motif to these hell scenes are the numerous versions of the Temptation of St Anthony.

Saftleven excelled at painting animals and often portrayed animals as active characters, occasionally with a hidden allegorical role. As a draftsman, Saftleven is best known for his black chalk drawings of single figures, usually young men, and his studies of animals, which show Roelandt Savery's influence.
