= Sara Saftleven =

Dutch artist (1645–1702)

Sara Saftleven (1645 – 1702), was a Dutch Golden Age flower painter.

== Biography ==
She was born in Utrecht as the daughter of the landscape painter Herman Saftleven, who taught her to paint. She first married Jacob Adriaensz Broers in 1671 who died 6 years later. In 1685 she married Captain Paul Dalbach, who died in 1691. She married for the third and last time in Blaricum in 1692 to the mayor of Naarden, Jacob Ploos, who died two years later. She had no known children and her flower still lifes are no longer known, though two drawings are in the print cabinet of the Museum Boijmans van Beuningen. She died in Naarden.
