= Shi Zhonggui (painter) =

Chinese painter, philosopher and poet (born 1954)

Shi Zhonggui (simplified Chinese: 史忠贵; traditional Chinese: 史忠貴; pinyin: Shǐ Zhōngguì) is a Chinese painter, philosopher and poet born in 1954 in Chengdu, Sichuan.

Shi Zhonggui's paintings in Chinese ink and colour on rice paper evoke the vast expanses of Western China. His paintings have a sense of both freedom and tranquillity.

== Biography ==
At 16 he became a professional painter. In 1978 he studied traditional Chinese painting at the Sichuan Academy of Fine Arts. At this time he was also writing poetry and published a number of books.

In 1994 the Sichuan Museum nominated Shi Zhonggui as one of its official artists and in 1996 he was appointed Professor at the College of Arts at Sichuan University. Since 1999, when he had his first exhibitions in Paris and Geneva, Shi Zhonggui's work has also been well received in Europe. In 2000 he was made a Member of the Academie des Arts-Sciences-Lettres de France and won the 2000 Grande Medaille de Vermeil, the first Chinese artist ever to win this award.

== Exhibitions ==
- 1973 – Hangzhou, China
- 1992 – Bangkok, Thailand
- 1993 – Guangzhou, China, First Art Fair of China
- 1995 – Tokyo, Japan, Ginza Art Gallery
- 1996 – Taipei, Taiwan, Jixianin Art Center
- 1997 – Taichung, Taiwan, Dingfeng Art Gallery
- 1998 – Singapour, Tiandu Gallery
- 1999 – Paris, France, Galerie Kalliste 21
- 1999 – Geneva, Switzerland, Galerie l'Ancre Bleue
- 2000 – Barcelona, Spain
- 2000 – London, UK, Bloxham Galleries
- 2001 – Geneva, Switzerland, Galerie l'Ancre Bleue
- 2001 – Londres, UK, Bloxham Galleries
- 2002 – Tourgeville, France, Galerie de Tourgeville
- 2002 – Hamburg, Germany, Tecis Gallery
- 2003 – Paris, France, Galerie Kalliste 21
- 2004 – Paris, France, Chart Galerie
- 2005 – Paris, France, Galerie Art Contemporain
- 2005 – Geneva, Switzerland, Galerie l'Ancre Bleue
- 2006 – Chengdu, China, Sichuan Art Museum
- 2007 – Beijing, China, 798 Art Zone
- 2009 – Geneva, Switzerland, Galerie l'Ancre Bleue
- 2010 – Los Angeles, CA, Bamboo Lane
- 2010 – Hunan, China, Hunan Provincial Painting Academy
- 2014 – Geneva, Switzerland, Galerie l'Ancre Bleue
- 2015 – Taipei, ARKI GALÉRIA
- 2018 – Geneva, Galerie l'Ancre Bleue
