= Altoon Sultan =

American painter and author

- Born: 1948 (age 77–78); Brooklyn, New York, U.S.
- Education: Brooklyn College (BFA, MFA); Skowhegan School of Painting and Sculpture
- Known for: Egg tempera painting, rural landscapes
- Website: altoonsultan.com

Altoon Sultan (born 1948) is an American artist known for her small-scale egg tempera paintings depicting details of agricultural machinery. Working in a tradition of formalist realism, her works nevertheless treat her subject matter like found abstractions. Sultan lives and works in Groton, Vermont.

== Early life and education ==
Sultan was born in Brooklyn, New York, in 1948. She received a Bachelor of Fine Arts degree in 1969 and a Master of Fine Arts in 1971 from Brooklyn College, where she studied painting with Philip Pearlstein and Lois Dodd. She also attended the Skowhegan School of Painting and Sculpture in Maine.

== Work ==
Sultan’s paintings are often based on photographs she has taken of agricultural landscapes and equipment. Her technique combines representational detail with simplified forms and bold use of color, sometimes compared to minimalist approaches to composition. In 1972 and 1974 Sultan was the recipient of a MacDowell residency.

In addition to painting, Sultan writes about art and maintains Studio and Garden, a blog featuring her photography, reflections on her practice, and exhibition commentary.

Her work has been shown at Tibor de Nagy Gallery (New York),

== Collections ==
Sultan’s work is included in several public collections, including the:

- Metropolitan Museum of Art, New York
- National Museum of Women in the Arts, Washington, D.C.
- National Gallery of Australia
- Tate Gallery, London
- Walker Art Center, Minneapolis

== Publications ==
- The Luminous Brush: Painting with Egg Tempera. Watson-Guptill, 1999. ISBN 0-8230-2888-7
