= Herman Saftleven =

Dutch painter

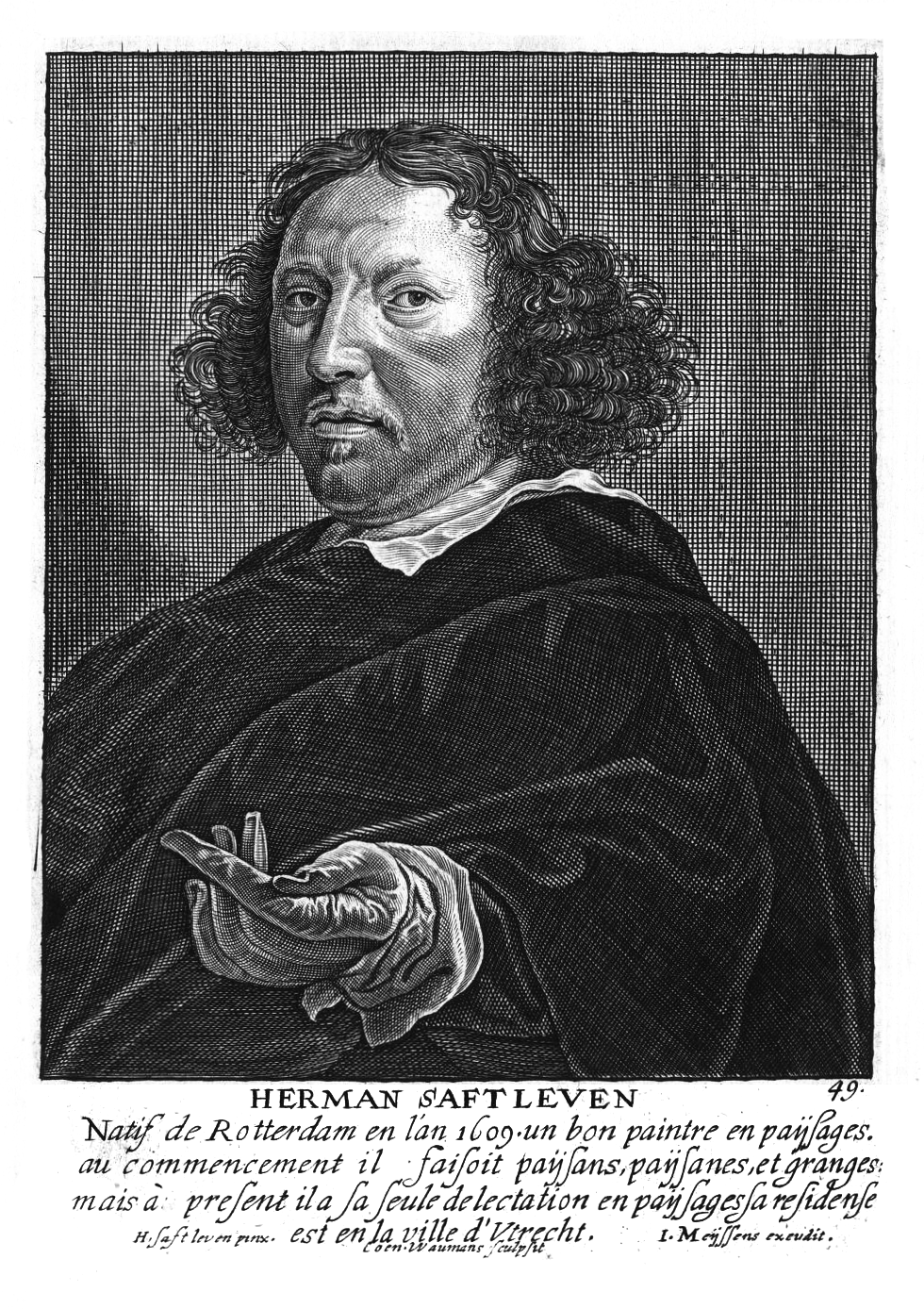
Herman Saftleven in Het Gulden Cabinet p 275

Herman Saftleven the Younger (1609 - 5 January 1685 (buried)), was a Dutch painter of the Baroque period.

== Biography ==
Born in Rotterdam, Saftleven lived most of his life (1632–1685) in Utrecht. His brothers, Cornelis Saftleven (1607–1681) and Abraham Saftleven were both painters. The former was even better known as a painter, specializing in genre scenes, while Herman was known for his landscapes of river scenes as well as of persons traveling through woods. His father, Herman Saftleven I was a painter in Rotterdam, who died by 1627. One of Herman II’s daughters, Sara Saftleven, born in Utrecht after 1633, also became a painter of flowers in watercolors. She married Jacob Adriaensz Broers in 1671.

Herman became the dean of the Guild of St Luke in Utrecht. After the 1674 derecho had destroyed most of the town, he sold the city a series drawings he had made of Utrecht churches before they were destroyed. In the 1680s, he was commissioned by the amateur botanist and horticulturalist Agnes Block, to draw flowers and plants at her country estate near Utrecht. He died in Utrecht.

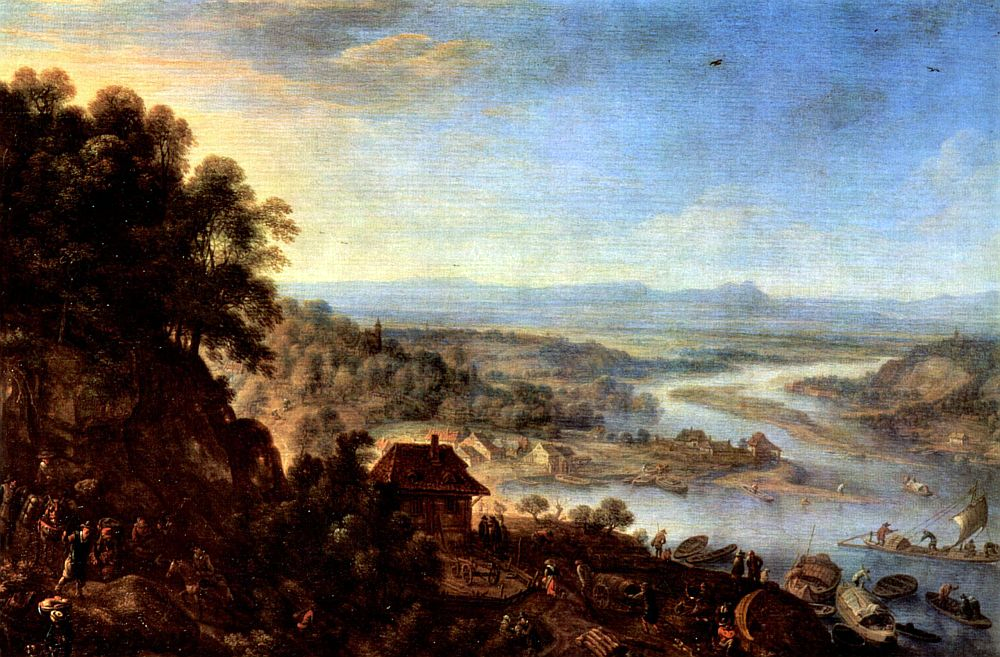
Herman Saftleven, Erbach im Odenwald, Rheingauansicht mit Taunusbergen, 1665

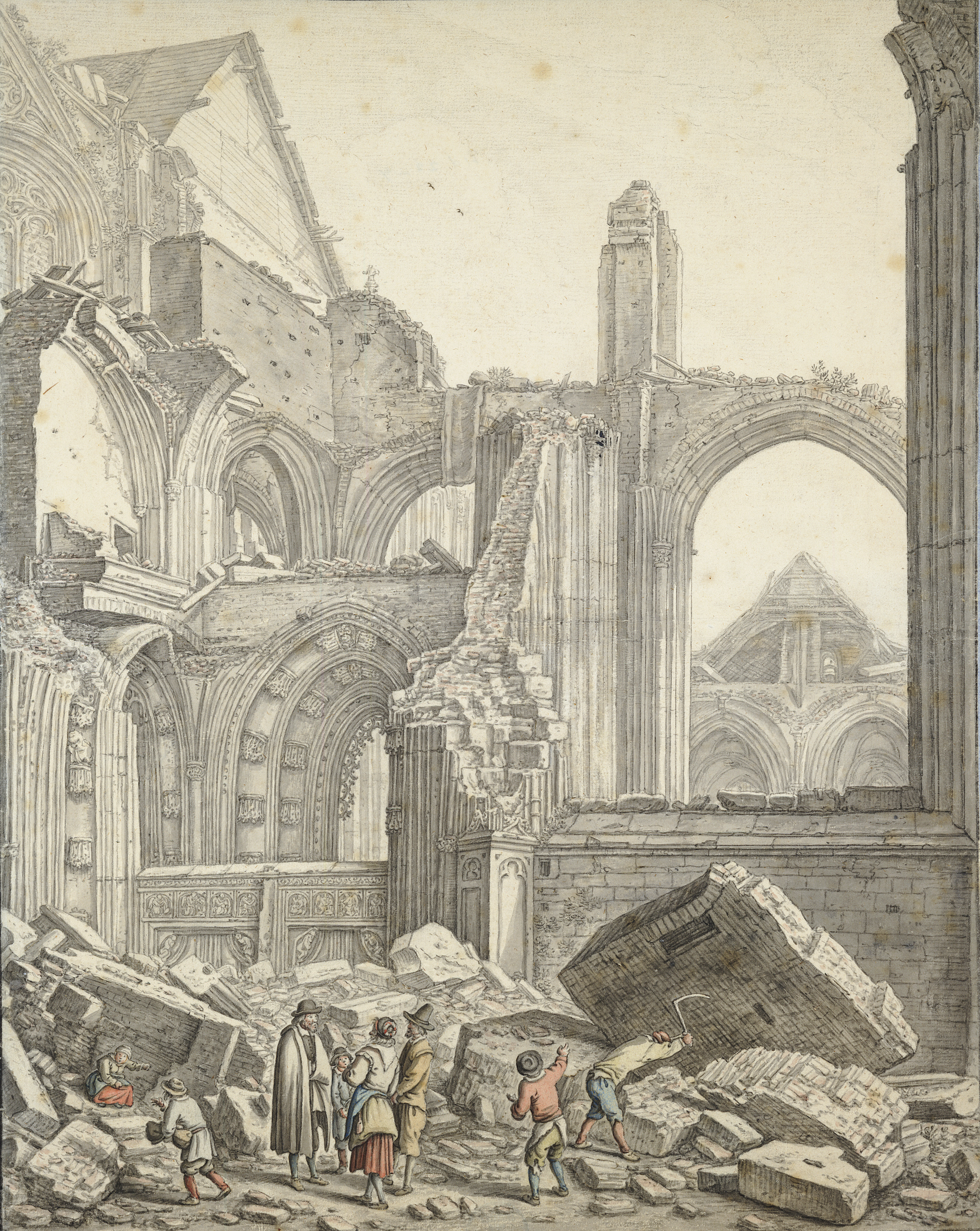
Herman Saftleven, artwork done for the book De Dom in Puin by Saftleven Graafhuis, documenting storm damage in the city of Utrecht
