= Beauty Union =

Dutch trade union

The Beauty Union (Dutch: Mooi) is a trade union representing workers in the hairdressing, beauty and wellness industries in the Netherlands.

The union was founded on 16 October 1932, as the Dutch Catholic Union of Barbers and Hairdressers, also known as "St Cosmas". It affiliated to the Dutch Catholic Trade Union Federation (NKV). It initially had only 179 members, and by 1939 had grown to only 232. It was banned by the Nazi occupiers during World War II, but was reformed in 1945, and then began to grow, membership reaching 1,117 in 1947.

In 1975, the union renamed itself as the Hairdressers' Union. While most of the NKV affiliates merged with equivalent unions in the Dutch Confederation of Trade Unions (NVV), its hairdressers were part of the large Industrial Workers' Union NVV, and the Hairdressers' Union preferred to remain independent. In 1980, it transferred to the NKV's successor, the Federation of Dutch Trade Unions (FNV).

In 1981, the political scientist Paul Jekkers was asked to draw up a contract for workers in the industry, but impressed the union sufficiently that he was elected as its president. He tried to negotiate a merger into the Services Union, but found that that union was in a poor financial position and would not be able to maintain the union's existing level of organisation. Despite this, he took the union's membership to 3,500 by 1989, when the Industrial Workers' Union decided to withdraw from the trade, and its 500 hairdressers transferred over.

By 1999, the union had 7,695 members. The union changed its name in about 2000, recognising that many hairdressing salons were also offering other beauty treatments.
