= Johan Stekelenburg =

Dutch union leader and politician (1941–2003)

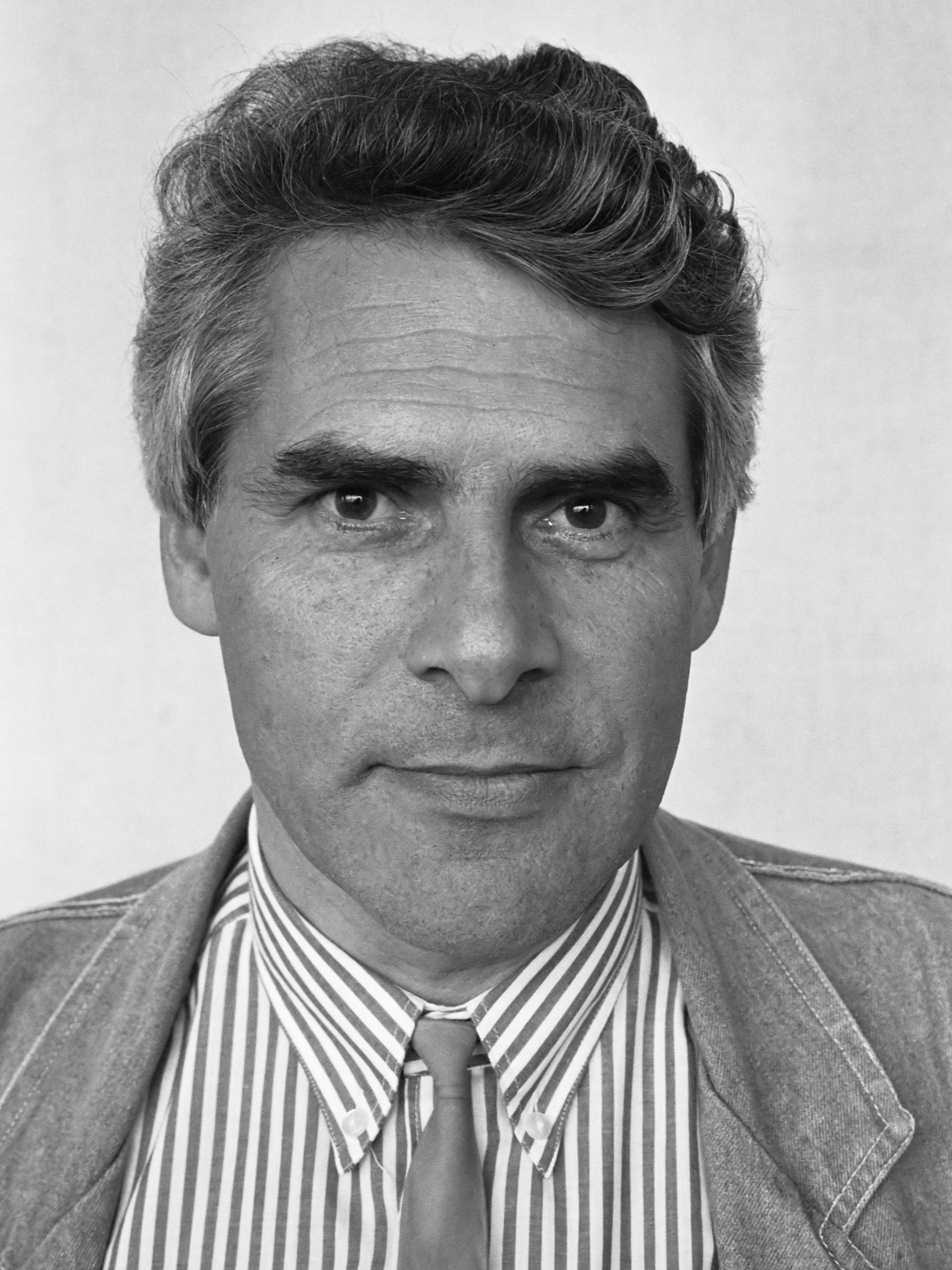
- Johan Stekelenburg in 1988

Member of the Senate
- In office 8 June 1999 – 22 September 2003

Personal details
- Born: Johannes Stekelenburg; 31 October 1941 Maarssen, Netherlands
- Died: 22 September 2003 (aged 61) Tilburg, Netherlands
- Party: PvdA (1966–2003)
- Spouse(s): Alida/Lideke Gerritsen (m. 1966; div. 1985) Helena Martha Hoekstra (m. 1993)
- Relations: Jan Stekelenburg (twin brother)
- Children: 2

Johannes "Johan" Stekelenburg (31 October 1941 – 22 September 2003) was a Dutch trade union leader and politician. He was involved in the Dutch labour movement, serving as chairman of the Federation of Dutch Trade Unions (FNV) from 1988 to 1997. Stekelenburg was a member of the Dutch Senate from 1999, became mayor of Tilburg that same year, and was widely viewed as a potential candidate for prime minister until his death in 2003.

== Early life ==
Johan Stekelenburg was born on 31 October 1941 in Maarssen to Willem Stekelenburg and Maagje Verhoeff. Stekelenburg, who was one of two monozygotic twins along with Jan Stekelenburg, grew up in a poor family of 9 children in Tienhoven. His father was a roller operator at the Demka steel mill in Utrecht, who was active in the Dutch Confederation of Trade Unions (NVV), which had a large influence on Stekelenburg during his youth.

The Stekelenburg family was religious, and were members of the Christian left Christian Democratic Union, joining the Labour Party (PvdA) after World War II. He belonged to the Dutch Reformed Church of his family during his youth and attended a Christian school in Utrecht and a Reformed social academy in Driebergen, but left the church after finishing his studies in 1966 because he felt it lacked a willingness to change and solidarity with the lower classes in society. That same year, Stekelenburg joined the PvdA.

== Union career ==
In August 1966, Stekelenburg began work as an employee of the General Dutch Metal Industry Union in Leeuwarden, where he trained union representatives to work within companies. During this period, he was also involved in a radical movement to democratise the labour movement as well as the local branch of the PvdA. Stekelenburg, a car rally enthusiast, also helped found the Night of Leeuwarden rally in 1966, which became a regular yearly event after.

In 1972, he became district leader of the Industrial Workers' Union NVV (IB-NVV) in Arnhem, before becoming district head of the newly formed Federation of Dutch Trade Unions (FNV) first in The Hague in 1977 and then in Rotterdam in 1979. That year, Stekelenburg was severely beaten during a strike at the Shell refinery in Pernis, after the company had hired strikebreakers, a moment which he would later remember as "the most dramatic of [his] career".

As a union leader, Stekelenburg was well liked by the membership, although some within the IB-NVV considered him too cautious. Stekelenburg, who was a moderniser and was supported by younger members of the IB-NVV, was heavily opposed by the old guard leadership of that union. This culminated in 1982, when Stekelenburg sought to become leader of the IB-NVV and faced a contentious and personal campaign for the office, and eventually agreed to suspend his campaign to save the FNV's reputation and in exchange for becoming the FNV's national executive coordinator for the chemical industry the next year.

Upon his departure in 1986, chairperson of the FNV Wim Kok had spoken out internally in favour of having Stekelenburg succeed him, but due to a campaign led by the Industrial Workers' Union and Abvakabo, Kok was instead succeeded by Hans Pont. Stekelenburg became vice-chairperson of the FNV, and had a very positive working relationship with Pont. After Pont unexpectedly stepped down, Stekelenburg became chairperson of the FNV in 1988, one of his first major actions being to lead a protest march in Amsterdam of 150,000 people against the policies of the Second Lubbers cabinet on 3 October. As FNV leader, Stekelenburg sought to modernise the FNV, improve its standing, and make the FNV "more service-oriented, proactive, and also more cheerful." Under Stekelenburg's leadership, the FNV would become a pragmatic but self-confident organisation, and his popularity contributed to its membership increasing from 900,000 in 1986 to 1,2 million in 1998.

In 1991, after the Third Lubbers cabinet with the PvdA announced cuts to disability benefits, Stekelenburg sought to broker a compromise through the Social and Economic Council which he had been a part of since 1985 and vice-chairperson since 1988, but the compromise was rejected by the FNV. After former FNV leader Wim Kok became prime minister in 1994 with the support of the People's Party for Freedom and Democracy (VVD), Stekelenburg was critical, fearing for further damage to the welfare state and the minimum wage. In 1997, Stekelenburg stepped down as FNV leader, and was replaced by Lodewijk de Waal.

== Political career ==
In 1997, Stekelenburg was appointed as mayor of Tilburg. His appointment was initially controversial, because Tilburg had long been dominated politically by the Christian Democratic Appeal (CDA), and minister of internal affairs Frits Korthuis Altes had initially preferred CDA MP Yvonne van Rooy for the position. He quickly became popular among the residents of Tilburg due to his charisma and accessibility, as well as his frequent public engagement with local institutions such as the football club Willem II. Stekelenburg was also criticised for self-enrichment and not spending enough time on his mayorship due to his many side positions in various non-governmental organisations and companies.

On 8 June 1999, Stekelenburg became a member of the Senate for the PvdA, focusing primarily on social affairs, and becoming the PvdA's parliamentary leader in the Senate in 2002 after a vote of the PvdA membership. He became increasingly prominent within the PvdA, and was considered a candidate to become mayor of Amsterdam or Rotterdam, as well as for PvdA leader in 1999, which ultimately went to Ad Melkert. After the PvdA's defeat in the 2002 Dutch general election and Melkert's subsequent resignation, Stekelenburg was approached by party leadership as a potential candidate for prime minister.

That same year, Stekelenburg was diagnosed with esophageal cancer, which gradually forced him out of work and led him to decline the offer to become a candidate for prime minister. Johan Stekelenburg died on 22 September 2003 in Tilburg. Stekelenburg's death was mourned widely, with his funeral being attended by more than 1,000 mourners and viewed on television by an estimated 115,000 people.

== Personal life ==
Stekelenburg was married two times, the first to Alida or Lideke Gerritsen on 21 September 1966, with whom he had two sons. During Stekelenburg's period as IB-NVV district leader in Arnhem, he became romantically involved with Helena Martha Hoekstra, an office colleague, leading to him divorcing his first wife in 1986, and marrying Hoekstra on 26 November 1993.

His monozygotic twin brother Jan Stekelenburg, with whom Stekelenburg was close friends, was a prominent sports broadcaster and presenter of NOS Studio Sport.
