= Transport Workers Union =

Transport Workers Union may refer to:

- Transport Workers Union of America, active in the United States
- Transport Workers Union of Australia
- Transport Workers' Union (Netherlands), former Dutch trade union
  - Transport Workers' Union NKV, former Catholic trade union in the Netherlands
  - Transport Workers' Union NVV, former social democratic trade union in the Netherlands
- Swedish Transport Workers' Union

== See also ==
- Maharashtra Sugarcane Cutting and Transport Workers Union
- South African Transport and Allied Workers Union
- Transport and General Workers' Union (disambiguation), various unions
- Transport and Industrial Workers Union, active in Trinidad and Tobago
