= Trade unions in the Netherlands =

Trade unions play a major role in the corporatist Dutch economy.

== Dynamics ==
In 2001 about 25% of the Dutch people who were employed were organized in a union. There are three major unions: the Christian democratic Christian National Trade Union Federation (CNV), the social democratically oriented Federation of Dutch Trade Unions (FNV) and the Trade Union Federation for Professionals (VCP). All are federations of sector-based labour unions. The FNV is the largest of the three with about 1.4 million members. The CNV has 350.000 members, and the VCP has 160.000. The FNV has 17 affiliate unions, the CNV 11 and the VCP 4.

The labour unions play a major role in the Dutch economy because, first, they bargain with employers' organizations over wages and working conditions (these deals are binding for all employed people), and second, they advise the government on economic legislation through their membership of the Social and Economic Council (SER).

Traditionally Dutch labour unions were part of the pillarized structure of society. Each social group had a pillar: the Protestants (CNV), the Catholics (NKV, merged into FNV), the social democrats (NVV, merged into FNV) and the syndicalists (NAS).

== See also ==
- Economy of the Netherlands
- Trade unions in Belgium
- Trade unions in France
- Trade unions in Germany
- Trade unions in the United Kingdom
- Trade unions in Europe
