= Food Workers' Union =

The Food Workers' Union (Dutch: Voedingsbond, VB) was a general union for agricultural and food production workers, in the Netherlands.

The union was founded in 1980, with the merger of the Industrial Union of Agriculture and Food and the Catholic Union of Agriculture, Food and Tobacco. These unions had previously been affiliated to the Dutch Confederation of Trade Unions (NVV) and Dutch Catholic Trade Union Federation (NKV), respectively, but the two federations were in the process of merging to form the Dutch Federation of Trade Unions (FNV), to which the new union affiliated. The Food Workers' Union was the first to be formed in this way, with others following over the next two years.

In 1989, the union's members in the hospitality sector transferred to the Catering Union. By 1997, the union had 64,014 members, of whom 74% worked in food production, 21% in agriculture, and the remainder in hospitality. In 1998, the union merged with the Industrial Workers' Union, the Services Union, and the Transport Workers' Union, to form the Allied Union.

== Presidents ==
1980: Cees Schelling
1984: Greetje Lubbi
1992: Paul Andela
