= Socialism in the Netherlands =

This article gives an overview of socialism in the Netherlands, including communism and social democracy. It is limited to communist, socialist, social democratic, and democratic socialist parties with substantial support, mainly proved by having had a representation in parliament.

== Overview ==
Socialism came relatively late to the Netherlands, because of its slow industrialization. In the 1860s a socialist movement began to develop. Although the socialists were aided by the foundation of the First International and of the first Dutch trade unions, united in the Algemeen Nederlands Werklieden Vereniging, a socialist party was not founded until 1881, when the Social Democratic League was founded. The slow industrialization was reflected in the support base of the first socialist parties. It wasn't the urban proletariat which supported them most, instead it were agricultural workers, who were the first to support the League.

Before the First World War, the socialist movement saw two major splits: in 1894 between revolutionary anarchists and parliament-oriented socialists. The latter left the League to found the Social-Democratic Workers' Party, while the former kept control of the SDB, which was soon banned by the government. The second split was between a revolutionary Marxist opposition and a reformist-revisionist establishment. In 1907 the opposition group left the SDAP to found the Social-Democratic Party, which would become the Communist Party of the Netherlands (CPN) after the Russian Revolution. This was one of the first splits between reformists and revolutionaries within the European labour movement. Both the revolutionaries and the reformists have their own labour unions, the reformist Nederlands Verbond van Vakverenigingen and the anarcho-syndicalist Nationaal Arbeidssecretariaat. At the end of the First World War, a brief and very unsuccessful attempt at revolution occurred during the Red Week.

After the Second World War, the SDAP merged with smaller left-liberal, progressive catholic and Protestant groups and parties to form the Labour Party (PvdA). The founders hoped that the old social structures would be replaced by a united progressive Netherlands, the Breakthrough. However, the Labour Party quickly found itself taking the SDAP's old place in the socialist pillar. It only gained only a third of the seats in the 1946 elections. From 1946 and 1958, PvdA leader Willem Drees served as prime minister of a broad coalition. The PvdA became social-democratic supporting a welfare state, a mixed economy, decolonization and NATO. In 1946 the CPN performed particularly well as it had gained support due to the role played by communists in the Dutch Resistance.

During the 1960s and 1970s socialism was invigorated with the development of New Left-movements. In 1957 the Pacifist Socialist Party (PSP) was founded out of the developing peace movement and provided an alternative to the pro-American PvdA and the pro-Soviet CPN. In 1967 the Nieuw Links, a group of young socialists within the PvdA gained control of the party and set out on a new course, which included both social-democratic and New Left ideals, such as a strong welfare state, women's liberation, environmental protection and international development. They wanted to form a progressive majority-coalition, together with their left-liberal and progressive Christian allies. A group of social-democrats leave the PvdA to form DS'70. The PvdA and their allies were unsuccessful at gaining a majority however in the 1971 and 1972 elections and the PvdA's leader Joop den Uyl was forced to form a tenuous coalition with the Christian democrats.

During the 1980s socialism, communism and social-democracy were forced into a defensive position. The smaller socialist parties, PSP and CPN, which prospered in the 1960s and 1970s, lost seats, whilst the CPN disappeared from the House of Representatives in the 1986. The PvdA was confined to opposition, while the liberals and Christian democrats reformed the welfare state. The socialist labour union lost members and merged with the Catholic labour union to form the Federatie Nederlandse Vakbeweging.

In the 1990s socialists and social-democrats renewed themselves. In 1989 the PSP and CPN merged with two small Christian left parties (the Evangelical People's Party and the Political Party of Radicals) to form GreenLeft. In the 1994 general election Wim Kok, the new leader of the PvdA, lost a considerable number of seats, but still emerged as leader of the largest party. He forms an unprecedented purple coalition with progressive and conservative liberals which implements a Third Way policy, including privatisation of public companies, legalisation of prostitution and euthanasia and some institutional reforms. In 1994 a small formerly Maoist party, the Socialist Party (SP) also entered parliament.

In 2007 the PvdA re-enters the coalition, now with Christian-democrats and the economically left-leaning but socially conservative ChristianUnion. The SP won an unprecedented 25 seats in the 2006 elections. Since 2004, GreenLeft has radically renewed its image and is now promoting itself as a left-liberal party, breaking with its socialist roots.

== Socialist thinkers ==
Influential Dutch socialist thinkers include:

- Anton Pannekoek, council communist theorist.
- Jacques de Kadt, Marxist, anti-stalinist and social-democrat

== See also ==
- History of the Netherlands
- Politics of the Netherlands
- List of political parties in the Netherlands
- Anarchism in the Netherlands
- Liberalism in the Netherlands
- Christian democracy in the Netherlands
- Trade unions in the Netherlands
