= Dutch Catholic Printing Union =

Dutch trade union

The Dutch Catholic Printing Union (Dutch: Nederlandse Katholieke Grafische Bond, NKGB) was a trade union representing workers in the printing industry in the Netherlands.

The union was founded in 1902, as a counterpart to the secular General Dutch Typographers' Union. In 1925, it was a founding affiliate of the Roman Catholic Workers' Federation, and it was then affiliated to its successors, the Catholic Workers' Movement and the Dutch Catholic Trade Union Federation (NKV). By 1964, the union had 15,374 members.

In 1976, the NKV merged with its secular counterpart, to form the Dutch Federation of Trade Unions, and in 1982, the NKGB similarly merged with the General Dutch Printing Union, to form the Printing and Paper Union.
