= Dutch Teachers' Association =

Dutch trade union

The Dutch Teachers' Association (Dutch: Nederlandse Onderwijzers Vereniging, NOV) was a trade union in the Netherlands.

The union was founded in 1946, when the Union of Dutch Teachers (BNO) merged with the Dutch Education Society. Unlike the BNO, it did not affiliate to the Dutch Confederation of Trade Unions (NVV), instead remaining independent. In 1949, the Mulo union merged in, and in 1950, membership finally returned to the pre-war level of the BNO.

The union focused on campaigning for smaller class sizes, higher salaries, and more funding for state schools. This approach finally showed results in the 1960s. By 1965, it had 22,332 members. The following year, it merged with the Dutch Association of Industrial Education Teachers, to form the General Union of Education Personnel.
