= De Unie =

Trade union

De Unie is a trade union representing professionals in the private sector in the Netherlands.

The union was founded in 1972, when the Dutch Catholic Union of Foremen and Supervisors merged with the Union of Clerical and Supervisory Staff. It was initially named the Union of Officials, Management and Senior Personnel (BHLP). Like both its predecessors, it affiliated to the Dutch Catholic Trade Union Federation (NKV). It admitted members regardless of their religious affiliation, and approve of the NKV's moves towards secularism, but disagreed with the federation's interest in a merger with the social democratic Dutch Confederation of Trade Unions (NVV). In 1974, when the NKV and the NVV formed a federation, the BHLP resigned, instead joining the new Federation of Middle and Higher Personnel (MHP).

By 1997, the union had 110,396 members, of whom, 18% worked in commerce, 17% in metals, 11% in chemicals, and the remainder across a wide variety of industries. In 2012, it left the MHP, disagreeing with its approach to the public sector, but rejoined in 2017, after it had been renamed as the Trade Union Federation for Professionals.
