= Marechaussee Union =

Trade union

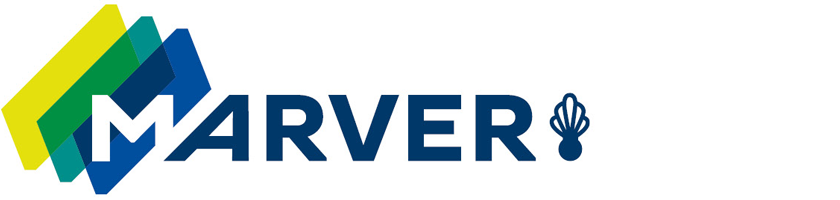
Logo of the Marver Union.

The Marechaussee Union (Dutch: Marechausseevereniging), usually known as MARVER, is a trade union representing members of the Royal Marechaussee in the Netherlands.

The union was founded on 15 April 1907, acting as a trade association for members of the Marechaussee who were not officers. In 1978, it finally decided to admit officers to the organisation.

The union affiliated to the Christian National Trade Union Federation, but in 1999, it transferred to the Federation of Dutch Trade Unions, and began working closely with the General Federation of Military Personnel.
