= Construction and Wood Union =

The Construction and Wood Union (Dutch: Bouw en Houtbond, B&HB) was a trade union representing workers in the construction and woodworking industries in the Netherlands.

The union was founded on 1 January 1982, when the General Dutch Union of the Building and Wood Industries merged with the Dutch Catholic Union of the Building and Wood Industries. These unions had previously been affiliated to the Dutch Confederation of Trade Unions (NVV) and Dutch Catholic Trade Union Federation (NKV), respectively, but the two federations were in the process of merging to form the Dutch Federation of Trade Unions (FNV), to which the new union affiliated.

By 1998, the union had 160,009 members, with 88% working in construction, 11% in woodworking, and the remainder in housing services. In 2015, the union dissolved, its members becoming direct members of the FNV.

== Presidents ==
1982: Bram Buijs
1985: Jan Schuller
1993: Roel de Vries
2003: Dick van Haaster
2009: John Kerstens
2013: Willem Linders
2013: Charley Ramdas (acting)
