= Christian National Trade Union Federation =

Dutch federation of trade unions

CNV
- Christian National Trade Union Federation
- Christelijk Nationaal Vakverbond
- Founded: 13 May 1909
- Headquarters: Utrecht, The Netherlands
- Location: Netherlands
- Members: 350,000
- Affiliations: ITUC, ETUC
- Website: www.cnv.nl

The Christian National Trade Union Federation (Dutch: Christelijk Nationaal Vakverbond, CNV) is a federation of trade unions of the Netherlands.

== History ==
The CNV was founded on 13 May 1909, in Arnhem as a federation of several Christian unions. It was founded in reaction to the socialist Dutch Confederation of Trade Unions (NVV), which was founded in 1906. The CNV was more moderate than the NVV. It opposed the idea of class struggle and instead oriented itself towards a corporatist model of the economy. It was an interconfessional union, intended to represent both Protestant and Roman Catholic workers.

In 1912, however, the Roman Catholic bishops spoke out against interconfessional unions. All Roman Catholics left CNV and founded a separate Roman Catholic union, the RKWV "Rooms-Katholieke Werklieden Verbond" (Roman Catholic Workers' Union). The CNV orientated itself towards the Protestant Anti-Revolutionary Party, with which it formed the Protestant pillar.

After World War II, the corporatist model, which the CNV advocated was introduced in the Netherlands, this was combined with a strong welfare state. Unions received more influence in Dutch politics: the CNV became part of the Social-Economic Council an advisory board of government composed of representatives from unions, employers' organisations and independent scientists.

Because of the depillarisation of Dutch society and the rising political polarisation between left and right, the three major unions, the socialist NVV, the Protestant CNV and the Dutch Catholic Trade Union Federation (NKV) began to open talks in order to found one single federation of Dutch unions. In 1974 the CNV left those talks. In 1976 the NVV and NKV merged to form the Federation of Dutch Trade Unions (FNV), which was led by Wim Kok.

== Activities ==
The most important function of CNV is the CAO-talks, over wages and secondary working conditions, it holds with the employers' federations. It also advises government via the Social Economic Council in which other unions, the employers' organisations and government appointed experts also have seats.

== Ideology ==
The CNV started out as a moderate, Christian-democratic union, which was opposed to class struggle and workers' ownership of the means of production. Gradually, however, it oriented itself towards cooperation with the employers' organisations and a corporatist model of the economy. The CNV still prefers cooperating with employers over strikes.

It has founded a youth union, CNV-jongeren to address the issues of the ageing population and it has campaigned on issues of international cooperation with a separate organisation called CNV international.

== Organisation ==
The CNV is a federation of three affiliated trade unions. Its board is formed by four daily board members (a chairman, a vice-chairman, a secretary and a treasurer), and the chairs of the affiliated unions. The CNV has around 355,000 members. The current chair is Maurice Limmen. Although the CNV is formally independent of other organisations there are strong ideological and personal links with the CDA. Former CNV vice chair Aart-Jan de Geus served between 2002 and 2007 as CDA minister of Social Affairs and Employment for instance.

== Affiliates ==
=== Current affiliates ===
Union	Abbreviation	Founded
Professionals Union	Vakmensen	2010
Connectief	Connectief	2015
Youth Union	Jongeren	1955

=== Former affiliates ===
Union	Abbreviation	Founded	Left	Reason not affiliated	Membership (1965)
Arts Union	Kunstenbond	1981	2011	Merged into Vakmensen	80
Association of Christian Teachers in Technical Schools					1,100
Business Union	Bedrijvenbond	1998	2010	Merged into Vakmensen	N/A
Catholic Education Association	KOV	1979	1996	Merged into Onderwijs	N/A
Central Union of Dutch Christian Industrial Workers	CBC	1916	1971	Merged into CBC-Unitas	22,000
Christian Association of Non-Commissioned Officers			1981	Merged into ACOM	3,200
Christian Metal Industry Union in the Netherlands	CMB	1901	1972	Merged into IB	26,000
Christian Union of Cigar Makers and Tobacco Workers in the Netherlands			1969	Merged into CBWAT	1,300
Christian Union of Hairdressers					350
Christian Union of Workers in Agricultural and Tobacco	CBWAT	1969	1971	Merged into Voedingsbond	N/A
Dutch Central Union of Christian Workers in the Food and Drink Industries			1971	Merged into Voedingsbond	5,000
Dutch Christian Agricultural Workers' Union			1969	Merged into CBWAT	30,000
Dutch Christian Association of Pharmaceutical Assistants					330
Dutch Christian Civil Servants' Union	NCB	1952	1964	Split	N/A
Dutch Christian Clerical Union					16,000
Dutch Christian Printing Union					5,400
Dutch Christian Union of Dental Technicians					64
Dutch Christian Union of Domestic Workers					300
Dutch Christian Union of Executives					250
Dutch Christian Union of Government Workers	NCBO	1946	1982	Merged into Public	35,000
Dutch Christian Union of Salesmen					700
Dutch Christian Union of Workers in the Textile and Clothing Industries					8,400
Dutch Christian Workers' Organisation in Indonesia					1,800
Education Union	Onderwijs	1996	2015	Merged into Connectief	N/A
Food Union	Voedingsbond	1971	1983	Merged into Industrie en Voedingsbond	N/A
General Christian Organisation of Military Personnel	ACOM	1982			N/A
General Christian Police Union	ACP	1981			N/A
General Roman Catholic Civil Servants' Association	ARKA	1918	1982	Merged into Public	N/A
Industry and Food Union	Industrie en Voedingsbond	1983	1998	Merged into Bedrijvenbond	N/A
Industrial Workers' Union	IB	1973	1983	Merged into Industrie en Voedingsbond	N/A
Marechaussee Union	MARVER	1907	1999	Transferred to FNV	
Protestant Christian Association of Mining Supervisors					560
Protestant Christian Journalists' Union					175
Protestant Christian Mineworkers' Union	PCMB				1,075
Protestant Christian Teachers' Association	PCO	1974	1996	Merged into Onderwijs	N/A
Public Union	Public	1983	2015	Merged into Connectief	N/A
Services Union	Dienstenbond	1964	2015	Merged into Vakmensen	
Sextons' Union	Kostersbond		2020	Merged into Connectief	500
Transport Union	Vervoersbond	1903	1998	Merged into Bedrijvenbond	8,500
Union of Christian Police Staff in the Netherlands	BCPAN	1916	1981	Merged into ACP	5,000
Wood and Construction Union	Hout en Bouw	1955	2010	Merged into Vakmensen	31,000

== Presidents ==
1909: Hendrik Diemer
1916: Klaas Kruithof
1935: Antoon Stapelkamp
1947: Marinus Ruppert
1959: Cor van Mastrigt
1964: Jan van Eibergen
1969: Jan Lanser
1978: Harm van der Meulen
1986: Henk Hofstede
1992: Anton Westerlaken
1998: Doekle Terpstra
2005: Josine Westerbeek-Huitink
2005: René Paas
2009: Bert van Boggelen
2010: Jaap Smit
2014: Maurice Limmen
2018: Arend van Wijngaarden
2020: Piet Fortuin
