= Dutch Association of Teachers =

Dutch trade union

The Dutch Association of Teachers (Dutch: Nederlands Genootschap van Leraren, NGL) was a trade union representing secondary school teachers in the Netherlands.

The union was founded in 1972, when the Dutch Teachers' Association merged with the General Association for Secondary Education, the Christian Association for Secondary and Higher Education, and the Catholic Teachers' Union. It affiliated to the Centre for Middle and Senior Civil Servants until 1974, then to the Civil Service Centre, and from 1990, to the General Trade Union Federation. By 1995, it had 21,185 members. At the start of 1997, it merged with the General Union of Education Personnel, to form the General Education Union.
