= Catholic Union of Government Personnel =

Dutch Christian trade union

The Catholic Union of Government Personnel (Dutch: Katholieke Bond van Overheidspersoneel, KABO) was a trade union representing blue collar public sector workers in the Netherlands.

The union was founded in 1914, when the Roman Catholic Municipal Workers' Union, "St Paulus", was reconstituted as the Dutch Roman Catholic Bond of Government Staff, also known as "St Paul". In 1925, it was a founding affiliate of the Roman Catholic Workers' Federation, and in 1945 it joined its successor, the Catholic Workers' Movement. At this point, it had 13,110 members.

The union adopted its final name in 1949. In 1964, it joined the Dutch Catholic Trade Union Federation (NKV), at which time, it had 36,803 members. The NKV formed a federation with the Dutch Confederation of Trade Unions (NVV) in 1975. The KABO objected to this, but agreed on the condition that the two would not necessarily merge.

By 1980, the union had 45,708 members, 33% of whom worked in administration, 23% in communications, 22% in health, 9% in utilities, and the remainder in a variety of sectors. In 1982, it merged with the former NVV-affiliate the General Union of Civil Servants, to establish Abvakabo.
