= Federation of Maritime Workers =

Dutch trade union

The Federation of Maritime Workers (Dutch: Federatie van Werknemers in de Zeevaart, FWZ) was a trade union representing sailors in the Netherlands.

The union was founded in 1967, when the recently founded General Association of Seafarers merged with the Central Organisation of Sailors and Fishermen. Originally named the Federation of Workers' Organisations in Maritime Shipping, like both its predecessors, it affiliated to the Dutch Confederation of Trade Unions (NVV). In 1969, its fishing section transferred to the Dutch Transport Workers' Union, but in 1970, it was joined by the Association of Captains and Officers of the Merchant Navy. In 1974, the union formed the Federation of Transport Trade Unions, with the Transport Workers' Union NVV and the Transport Workers' Union NKV, but it left in 1976.

In 1982, the union was a founding affiliate of the Federation of Dutch Trade Unions (FNV), at which time, it had 6,368 members. In 2007, the union formed the Nautilus federation with the British National Union of Marine, Aviation and Shipping Transport Officers, and it accordingly renamed itself as Nautilus NL. At the same time, it created FNV Waterbouw, as a joint venture with the Construction and Wood Union, to represent marine engineers.

On 15 May 2009, the union merged fully into Nautilus International.

== Presidents ==
1967: Willy van Zuylen
1981: Cees Roodenburg
1988: Piet Trommel
1995: Ed Sarton
2006: Marcel van den Broek
