= Dutch Catholic Union of Agricultural Workers =

The Dutch Catholic Union of Agricultural Workers (Dutch: Nederlandse Katholieke Landarbeidersbond), also known as "Sint Deusdedit", was a trade union representing farm workers in the Netherlands.

== History ==
The union was founded in 1904, but dissolved in 1941 as most of its member left while it was under Nazi domination. It was re-established immediately after the liberation of the Netherlands, and by 1964, it had 21,974 members.

For most of its existence, the union was affiliated to the Dutch Catholic Trade Union Federation (NKV).

On 24 June 1968, it merged with the Dutch Catholic Union of Workers in the Food and Drink Industry, the Dutch Catholic Tobacco Workers' Union, and the Dutch Catholic Union of Hotel, Restaurant and Restaurant Employees, to form the Catholic Union of Agriculture, Food and Tobacco.
