= Jongerius =

Jongerius is a surname. Notable people with the surname include:

- Agnes Jongerius (born 1960), Dutch trade unionist and politician
- Hella Jongerius (born 1963), Dutch industrial designer
