= General Dutch Workers' Union =

Dutch former trade union federation

- Algemeen Nederlandsch Werklieden-Verbond (ANWV)
- Successor: General Dutch Trade Union
- Formation: 1871
- Dissolved: 1919
- Members: 5,000 (1874) ca. 2,500 (1894); 1,112 (1919)
- Key people: Bernardus Hermanus Heldt (1871–1903)
- Publication: De Werkmansbode

The General Dutch Workers' Union (Dutch: Algemeen Nederlandsch Werklieden-Verbond, ANWV) was a Dutch trade union federation. Founded in 1871 by Bernardus Hermanus Heldt, it was one of the earliest national unions in the Netherlands, counting around 5,000 members at its peak. Officially politically "neutral", the ANWV came to represent the moderate wing of the early Dutch labor movement and aligned itself with liberal political parties. After several splits in the late 1870s, the ANWV went into decline, and became attached to the progressive liberal Free-thinking Democratic League (VDB), being merged into the General Dutch Trade Union (Algemeen Nederlandsch Vakverbond) in 1919.

== Founding ==
In 1869, a Dutch branch of the First International had been founded, named the Dutch Workers' Union (Nederlandsch Werklieden-Verbond). The radicalism of the NWV led to a counter-reaction from more moderate elements within the Dutch labor movement, many of which desired a more nationally oriented movement.

On 30 October 1870, the General Dutch Workers' Union was officially founded. Its founder and first president was Bernardus Hermanus Heldt, a furniture maker from Amsterdam who had become active in the union movement in the 1860s, and had previously founded the Dutch Furniture Makers' Union the same year. Heldt would remain the ANWV's leader until 1903.

The main base of the ANWV consisted of skilled craftsmen, including typographers, carpenters, cabinet makers, and cigar makers. Its activities were initially largely concentrated in the major cities of Amsterdam and Rotterdam, though it would also grow to have branches in provincial areas such as Friesland, which already counted six union locals organized in a provincial association by 1872. The ANWV was also politically active, collecting 3,000 signatures in support of measures against child labor in 1874. It was also opposed to women working. While the ANWV did not categorically oppose strikes and supported them throughout the 1870s, it thought that striking should be a "last ditch measure", and was criticized as too cautious by more radical labor figures such as Hendrik Gerhard. The ANWV was a supporter of the cooperative movement, but while its leadership solely supported consumer cooperatives, many of its constituent unions remained supportive of establishing producers' associations as well.

Politically, the ANWV described itself as "neutral", but it became aligned with liberalism, with its leader Bernardus Hermanus Heldt serving as a member of the House of Representatives for the Liberal Union.The ANWV would go on to supplant the NWV as the foremost representative of the Dutch labor movement from 1872. When the Dutch branch of the First International ceased operation in 1874, nearly all remaining members joined the ANWV. In 1875, the ANWV had around 5,000 members.

== Splits and decline ==
From 1876, the ANWV faced increased competition from the Christian Dutch Workers' Union "Patrimonium", led by Klaas Kater and supported by Abraham Kuyper, which criticized the ANWV's secularism, especially its opposition to religious education, and its advocacy for universal male suffrage. ANWV leader Heldt's advocacy of free thought and birth control also became a focal point for criticism, with Kater criticizing Heldt as "the spreader of the immoral doctrine of the two-child system". As the ANWV's membership was largely Protestant, and many were actively religious, the Christian labor movement became the most prominent opponent of the ANWV in the 1880s.

It also faced increasing opposition from the left, with Willem Ansing proposing the adoption of the Gotha Program in 1878 at a national union congress but failing to overcome the ANWV's institutional opposition to socialism. That same year saw the foundation of the openly socialist Social Democratic League, which many leftist unionists joined. In an 1885 brochure, ANWV leader Heldt compared the socialists to the Christian churches, which in his eyes both promised future salvation, while the ANWV sought to realize tangible change on Earth.

In 1902, the ANWV officially affiliated itself with the progressive liberal Free-thinking Democratic League (VDB), becoming a loyal branch of the party in the years after. In 1914, the ANWV and its 2,000 members collectively joined the VDB, though it remained independent in regard to its labor activities. In 1894, the ANWV had around 2500 members, and had declined to 1,112 members in 1919. By 1917, it had stopped publishing its associated publication De Werkmansbode.

== Dissolution ==
In 1919, the ANWV reformed itself into the politically neutral General Dutch Trade Union (Algemeen Nederlandsch Vakverbond, ANV), and broke its formal ties to the VDB. The ANV, which had according to itself around 50,000 members, remained closely tied on an informal basis to the VDB, with many VDB members seeing it as an alternative to the social democratic Dutch Confederation of Trade Unions (NVV).

== Bibliography ==
- Bos, D. (2001-05-08). Waarachtige volksvrienden. De vroege socialistische beweging in Amsterdam, 1848-1894. Amsterdam: Prometheus. ISBN 9789035123151.
- Harmsen, Ger; Reinalda, Bob (1975). Voor de bevrijding van de arbeid – beknopte geschiedenis van de Nederlandse vakbeweging (in Dutch). Amsterdam: Boom. ISBN 9789061687610.
- Klijnsma, Meine Henk (2007). Om de Democratie: de Geschiedenis van de Vrijzinnig-Democratische Bond, 1901-1946 [About Democracy: the History of the Free-thinking Democratic League, 1901-1946] (in Dutch). Amsterdam: Bert Bakker. ISBN 978-90-351-3239-9.
- Knotter, Ad (2025). TRANSFORMATIONS OF TRADE UNIONISM: comparative and transnational perspectives on workers... organizing in europe and the united states, eighteenth to twenty-first centuries. Work around the globe. S.l.: ROUTLEDGE. doi:10.5117/9789463724715. ISBN 978-1-041-18976-3.
