= Services Union (Netherlands) =

The Services Union (Dutch: Dienstenbond, Dibo) was a trade union representing workers in the service sector in the Netherlands.

The union was founded in 1981, with the merger of Mercurius and the Catholic Union of Commercial Employees. These unions had previously been affiliated to the Dutch Confederation of Trade Unions (NVV) and Dutch Catholic Trade Union Federation (NKV), respectively, but the two federations were in the process of merging to form the Dutch Federation of Trade Unions (FNV), to which the new union affiliated.

By 1997, the union had 101,111 members, of whom 53% worked in commerce, 14% in culture, 7% in banking, 7% in insurance, 6% in business services, 5% in social services, 4% in public administration, 3% in paper and printing, and 1% in health. In 1998, the union merged with the Food Workers' Union, the Industrial Workers' Union, and the Transport Workers' Union, to form the Allied Union.

== Presidents ==
1981: Alessandro Fogarin
1988: Lodewijk de Waal
1992: Martin Spanjers
