= NSGB =

NSGB may refer to:

- Dutch Painters' Assistants' Union, a Dutch trade union representing workers in the painting and decorating trades
- Guantanamo Bay Naval Base, a United States military base in Cuba
