= HZC =

HZC may refer to:

- HZC De Robben, Dutch water sports club
- HZC, code for The Black Corps, affiliate of Trade Union Federation for Professionals
- HZC, datapoint code for Huangzhai village in the study of Southeastern Loloish languages
- HZC, division code for Huangzhou, Huanggang, China
