= Arts Union =

The Arts Union is the name of:

- Arts Union (Germany), a former trade union in Germany
- Arts Union (Netherlands), a trade union in the Netherlands

== See also ==
- American Art-Union
- Art Union of London
