= Printing and Paper Union =

Printing and Paper Union is the name of:

- Printing and Paper Union (Germany), former trade union in Germany
- Printing and Paper Union (Netherlands), former trade union in the Netherlands

== See also ==
- Industrial Union of Printing and Paper, former trade union in East Germany
- Union of Printing and Paper, former trade union in Switzerland
