= CNV Public =

- CNV Public
- CNV Publieke Zaak
- Merged into: Connectief
- Founded: January 1, 1983
- Dissolved: 2015
- Headquarters: The Hague, Netherlands
- Location: Netherlands
- Members: 84,000
- Affiliations: CNV, EUROFEDOP
- Website: www.cnvpubliekezaak.nl

CNV Public was a trade union representing civil servants and healthcare workers in the Netherlands.

The union was formed in 1983 as the Union of Government, Health and Welfare, when the General Roman Catholic Civil Servants' Association merged with the Dutch Christian Union of Civil Servants, and the National Christian Union of Nurses. Like all its predecessors, it affiliated to the Christian National Trade Union Federation (CNV). By 1998, it was the largest affiliate of the CNV, with 85,605 members.

In 2015, the union merged with the Education Union, to form Connectief.
