= General Dutch Union of Workers in the Baking, Chocolate and Sugar Working Industries =

Dutch trade union

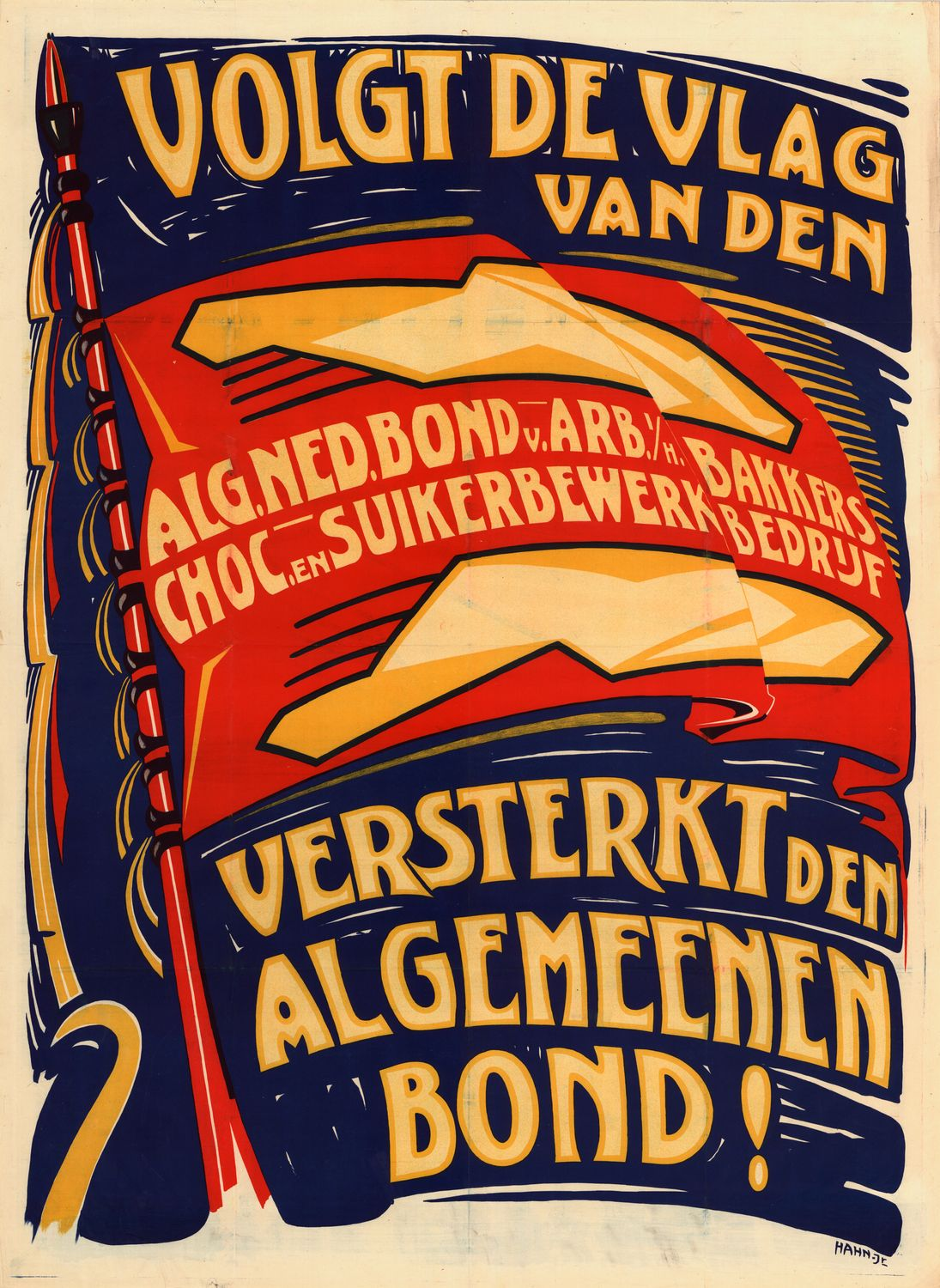
Poster designed by Albert Hahn Jr., 1923

The General Dutch Union of Workers in the Baking, Chocolate and Sugar Working Industries (Dutch: Algemeene Nederlandsche Bond van Arbeiders in het Bakkers-, Chocolade- en Suikerbewerkingsbedrijf) was a trade union representing workers in the bakery industry in the Netherlands.

The union was founded in 1908, when the Dutch Journeyman Bakers' Union (Dutch: Nederlandsche Bakkersgezellenbond) merged with the Dutch Union of Cacao, Chocolate and Sugar Workers (Dutch: Nederlandsche Bond van Cacao-, Chocolade- en Suikerbewerkers). It affiliated to the recently founded Dutch Confederation of Trade Unions (NVV), and also to the International Federation of Bakers, Pastry Cooks and Allied Workers' Associations.

In 1948, the union merged with the Dutch Union of Workers in the Meat and Related Industries to form the General Union of the Food and Stimulant Industries. Like both its predecessors, it affiliated to the Dutch Confederation of Trade Unions (NVV).
