= Connectief =

Dutch trade union

Connectief is a trade union representing workers in the public sector, healthcare and education in the Netherlands.

The union was founded in 2015, when the Education Union merged with the Public Union. Like both its predecessors, it affiliated to the Christian National Trade Union Federation. In 2020, the Sextons' Union merged in.
