= Dutch Musical Artists' Union =

Dutch trade union

The Dutch Musical Artists' Union (Dutch: Nederlandse Toonkunstenaarsbond, Ntb) was a trade union representing musicians, actors, artists and dancers in the Netherlands.

The union was founded in 1919, and for many years was affiliated with the Dutch Confederation of Trade Unions (NVV). By 1954, it had 1,130 members. In 1963, it resigned from the NVV, becoming independent.

In 2018, the union became the music section of the Arts Union, with its other members transferring to other sectors of the union.
