= Dutch Catholic Union of Transport Personnel =

Former trade union

The Dutch Catholic Union of Transport Personnel (Dutch: Nederlandse Katholieke Bond van Vervoerspersoneel, KBV), also known as "Sint Raphaël", was a trade union representing workers in the transport industry in the Netherlands.

The union was founded in 1903, as the Dutch Roman Catholic Union of Railway and Tramway Personnel, at a conference in Tilburg. By 1910, it had 4,000 members. From 1925, it was affiliated to the Roman Catholic Workers' Federation. In 1941, the Nazi occupiers ordered the union to come under their control, but the members instead dissolved it.

The union was re-established in 1945, affiliating to the Catholic Workers' Movement. Around thie time, it absorbed small unions representing workers at Van Gend & Loos, and KLM. As a result, it renamed itself as the KBV.

From 1963, the union was affiliated to the Dutch Catholic Trade Union Federation (NKV). That year, it absorbed the Dutch Catholic Union of Transport Workers. In 1969, it decided to accept all workers, regardless of religion, and renamed itself as the Transport Workers' Union NKV.

The NKV formed the Federation of Dutch Trade Unions (FNV) in 1974, and the union similarly formed a Federation of Transport Trade Unions, with the Transport Workers' Union NVV, and the Federation of Maritime Workers, although the maritime union left in 1976. By 1980, union membership was 20,916. On 1 January 1982, the union and the Transport Workers' Union NVV fully merged, forming the Transport Workers' Union.
