= General Union of Education Personnel =

Dutch trade union

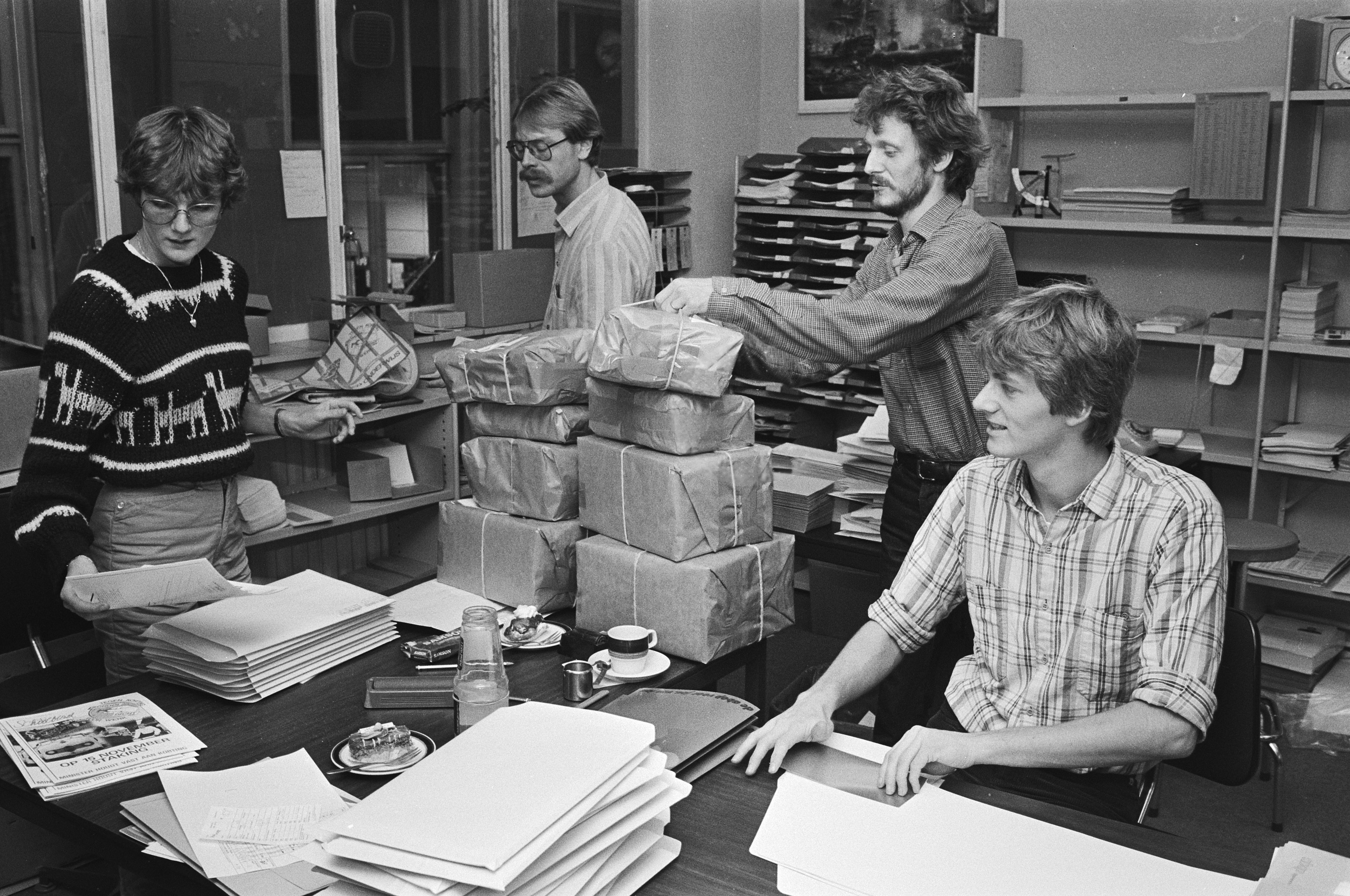
Voorbereidingen voor de schoolstaking in het hoofdkantoor van de ABOP, 12 November 1982

The General Union of Education Personnel (Dutch: Algemene Bond van Onderwijzend Personeel, ABOP) was a trade union representing workers in the education sector in the Netherlands.

The union was founded in 1966, when the Dutch Teachers' Association merged with the Dutch Association of Industrial Education Teachers. In 1971, it affiliated to the Dutch Confederation of Trade Unions, and then from 1981 to its successor, the Federation of Dutch Trade Unions. In 1982, it had 41,833 members, and this grew to 52,343 in 1995. At the start of 1997, it merged with the Dutch Association of Teachers, to form the General Education Union.

== Presidents ==
1966: Evert Steenbergen
1976: Jan van den Bosch
1988: Ella Vogelaar
1994: Jacques Tichelaar
