= Dutch Litho-, Photo- and Chemographers' Union =

Dutch Printers' Union

The Dutch Litho-, Photo- and Chemographers' Union (Dutch: Nederlandsche Lito-, Foto- en Chemigrafenbond, NLFCB) was a trade union representing printers in the Netherlands.

The union was established in 1912, when the Dutch Litho- and Photographers' Union merged with the General Dutch Chemographers' Union. Like both its predecessors, it affiliated to the Dutch Confederation of Trade Unions (NVV), and it also joined the International Federation of Lithographers, Lithographic Printers and Kindred Trades.

In 1945, the union merged with the Dutch Graphical Union, the General Dutch Typographers' Union, and the Dutch Union of Managers in the Graphic Industry, to form the General Dutch Printing Union.
