= Dutch Transport Workers' Union =

Dutch trade union

The Dutch Transport Workers' Union (Dutch: Nederlandse Bond van Vervoerspersoneel, NBV) was a trade union representing workers in the transport industry in the Netherlands.

The union was established in 1956, when the Dutch Transport Workers' Association merged with the Central Union of Workers in the Transport Industry. Like both its predecessors, the union affiliated to the Dutch Confederation of Trade Unions (NVV). The General Union of Aviation Workers joined in 1961, followed in 1969 by the fishing section of the General Union of Seafarers. In 1964, the union had 45,534 members. In 1972, the union was renamed as the Transport Workers' Union NVV.

The NVV formed the Federation of Dutch Trade Unions (FNV) in 1974, and the NBV similarly formed a Federation of Transport Trade Unions, with the Transport Workers' Union NKV, and the Federation of Maritime Workers, although the maritime union left in 1976. By 1980, union membership had risen slightly, to 49,225. On 1 January 1982, the NBV and the Transport Workers' Union NKV fully merged, forming the Transport Workers' Union.

== Presidents ==
1956: H. J. Kanne
c.1960: G. J. H. Alink
1973: Siem Barendregt
