= General Dutch Union of the Building and Wood Industries =

Dutch trade union

The General Dutch Union of the Building and Wood Industries (Dutch: Algemene Nederlandse Bond voor de Bouw- en Houtnijverheid, ANBH) was a trade union representing workers in the construction and wood industries in the Netherlands.

== History ==
The union was founded on 1 January 1970, when the General Dutch Construction Union merged with the General Industrial Union of Furniture Makers and Woodworkers. Like both its predecessors, it affiliated to the Dutch Confederation of Trade Unions (NVV). By 1980, the union had 95,090 members, of whom 89% worked in construction, and the remainder in woodworking and furniture making.

The union began working closely with the Dutch Catholic Union of the Building and Wood Industries, forming a loose federation in 1973, and a more formal one in 1976, through which both unions then channeled all their activities. On 1 January 1982, the two unions merged, to form the Construction and Wood Union. Throughout its existence, it was led by Bram Buijs.
