= Industrial Workers' Union NKV =

Dutch labour union

The Industrial Workers' Union NKV (Dutch: Industriebond NKV) was a general union in the Netherlands, principally representing manufacturing workers.

The union was founded on 1 January 1972, when the Dutch Catholic Union of Employees in Metal, Electronics and Related Companies merged with the Dutch Catholic Mineworkers' Union, the Dutch Catholic Clothing and Textile Workers' Union, and the Dutch Catholic Factory Workers' Union. Like all its predecessors, it affiliated to the Dutch Catholic Trade Union Federation.

By 1980, the union had 116,315 members, of whom, 50% worked in the metal industry, 15% in chemicals, 9% in textiles and clothing, 7% in food production, 5% in ceramics and glass, 4% in construction, 2% in paper and printing, 2% in personal services, 1% in mining and quarrying, and 5% in other areas of manufacturing. The following year, it merged with the rival Industrial Workers' Union NVV, to form the Industrial Workers' Union.

== Presidents ==
1972: Piet Brussel
