= Catholic Union of Commercial Employees =

Dutch Christian trade union from 1963

The Catholic Union of Commercial Employees (Dutch: Katholieke Bond van Personeel in de Handel, KBPH) was a trade union representing white collar workers in the Netherlands.

The union was founded in 1963, when the Dutch Catholic Union of Administrative, Selling and Insurance Personnel was split up. Like its predecessor, it affiliated to the Dutch Catholic Trade Union Federation. By 1964, it had 9,537 members.

In 1975, the union changed its name to the Services Union NKV, and the following year, it formed a federation with the rival Mercurius. The two unions merged completely in 1981, forming the Services Union.

== Presidents ==
1963: Piet Kafoe
