= General Industrial Union of Textiles and Clothing =

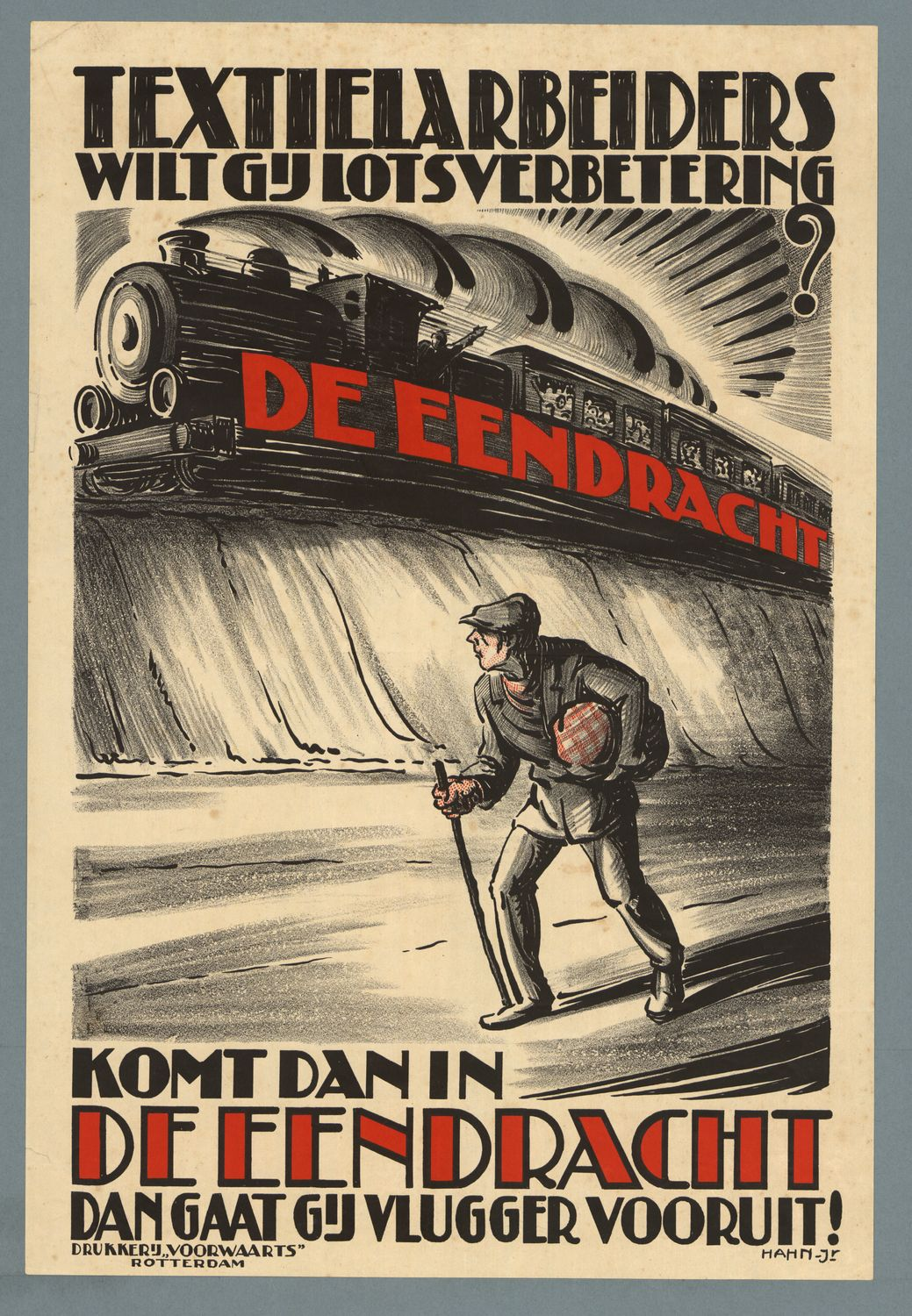
Poster calling on textile workers to join De Eendracht, designed by Albert Hahn jr.

The General Industrial Union of Textiles and Clothing (Dutch: Algemene Bedrijfsbond Textiel en Kleding, ABTK), also known as De Eendracht, was a trade union representing workers in the textile and garment industries in the Netherlands.

The union was founded in 1895, as the General Dutch Weavers' and Spinners' Union, becoming the General Dutch Union of Textile Workers soon afterwards. It absorbed the National Cotton Workers' Union, known as "De Eendracht", in 1904, while in 1906, it was a founding affiliate of the Dutch Confederation of Trade Unions.

During World War II, the union was controlled by the occupying Nazis, who enforced a merger between it and the Union of the Clothing Industry. After the war, it returned to social democratic control, but the merger was retained, under the name General Union of Workers in Textile and Clothing Companies. It adopted its final name in 1952.

By 1970, the union had 15,326 members. On 1 January 1972, it merged with the General Dutch Industrial Union of the Metal and Electronic Industries and the General Union of Miscellaneous Industries, forming the Industrial Workers' Union NVV.

== Presidents ==
1920: Gerrit Rengelink
1930s: Bart van Pelt
1945: Tonnis van der Heeg
1949:
1955: Theo de Jong
