= Transport Workers' Union (Netherlands) =

The Transport Workers' Union (Dutch: Vervoersbond, VB) was a trade union representing workers in the transport industry in the Netherlands.

The union was founded in 1981, with the merger of the Transport Workers' Union NVV and the Transport Workers' Union NKV. These unions had previously been affiliated to the Dutch Confederation of Trade Unions (NVV) and Dutch Catholic Trade Union Federation (NKV), respectively, but the two federations were in the process of merging to form the Dutch Federation of Trade Unions (FNV), to which the new union affiliated.

By 1997, the union had 79,617 members, of whom 17% worked on the railways. In 1998, the union merged with the Food Workers' Union, the Industrial Workers' Union, and the Services Union, to form the Allied Union.

== Presidents ==
1981: J. M. Schoonens
1988: Ruud Vreeman
1992: Wouter Waleson
