= Dutch Catholic Union of the Building and Wood Industries =

Dutch Christian trade union

The Dutch Catholic Union of the Building and Wood Industries (Dutch: Nederlandse Katholieke Bond voor de Bouw- en Houtnijverheid, KBBH) was a trade union representing workers in the construction and woodworking trades in the Netherlands.

The union was founded in 1972, when the Dutch Catholic Union of Building Workers merged with the Dutch Catholic Union of Workers in the Furniture, Furnishing, Wood and Related Industries. Like both its predecessors, the union affiliated to the Dutch Catholic Trade Union Federation. In 1980, the union had 80,973 members, of whom 90% worked in construction and almost all the remainder in woodworking.

The union was keen to work with the rival General Dutch Union of the Building and Wood Industries. They formed a loose federation in 1973 and a more formal one in 1976, thereafter agreeing policy jointly and enacting it through the federation. On 1 January 1982, the two unions merged, forming the Construction and Wood Union.
