= Dutch Independent Union of Public and Non-Profit Workers =

Dutch trade union

The Dutch Independent Union of Public and Non-Profit Workers (Dutch: Nederlandse Onafhankelijke Vakbond van de Overheids- en Non-profit sector, NOVON) was a trade union representing workers in the public and third sectors.

The union was founded on 1 November 1991, when the Dutch Association of Municipal Civil Servants merged with the General Association of Provincial Personnel in the Netherlands, the Association of Technical Civil Servants, and the Association of Civil Servants of the Water Boards in the Netherlands. Like all its predecessors, it affiliated to the General Trade Union Federation (AVC).

At the start of 1997, the union transferred from the AVC to the Federation of Dutch Trade Unions (FNV). By this point, it had 21,513 members. On 1 October 1998, it merged into Abvakabo, another FNV affiliate.
