= Bram Buijs =

Dutch trade unionist and politician

- Born: September 7, 1923; Arnemuiden, Netherlands
- Died: January 4, 1987 (aged 63)
- Occupation: Carpenter
- Organization(s): General Dutch Construction Union (ANB); General Dutch Union of the Building and Wood Industries; Construction and Wood Union; International Federation of Building and Wood Workers (IFBWW)

Abraham Buijs (7 September 1923 – 4 January 1987) was a Dutch trade unionist and politician.

Born in Arnemuiden, Buijs became a carpenter and joined the General Dutch Construction Union (ANB). He also joined the Labour Party, winning election to the local council in Vlissingen in 1949. In 1954, he became secretary of the ANB's Amsterdam branch, and in 1964 he became its president.

As leader of the union, he took it into successive mergers, forming the General Dutch Union of Building and Wood Industries, and then the Construction and Wood Union. In 1969, he also became president of the International Federation of Building and Wood Workers. He retired from all his posts in 1985 and died two years later.

Trade union offices
Preceded by Cornelis Brandsma	President of the General Dutch Construction Union; 1964–1970	Succeeded by Union merged
Preceded by James H. Mills	President of the International Federation of Building and Wood Workers; 1969–1985	Succeeded by Konrad Carl
Preceded by New position	President of the General Dutch Union of Building and Wood Industries; 1971–1981	Succeeded by Union merged
Preceded by New position	President of the Construction and Wood Union; 1982–1985	Succeeded by Jan Schuller
