= General Dutch Construction Union =

Dutch trade union

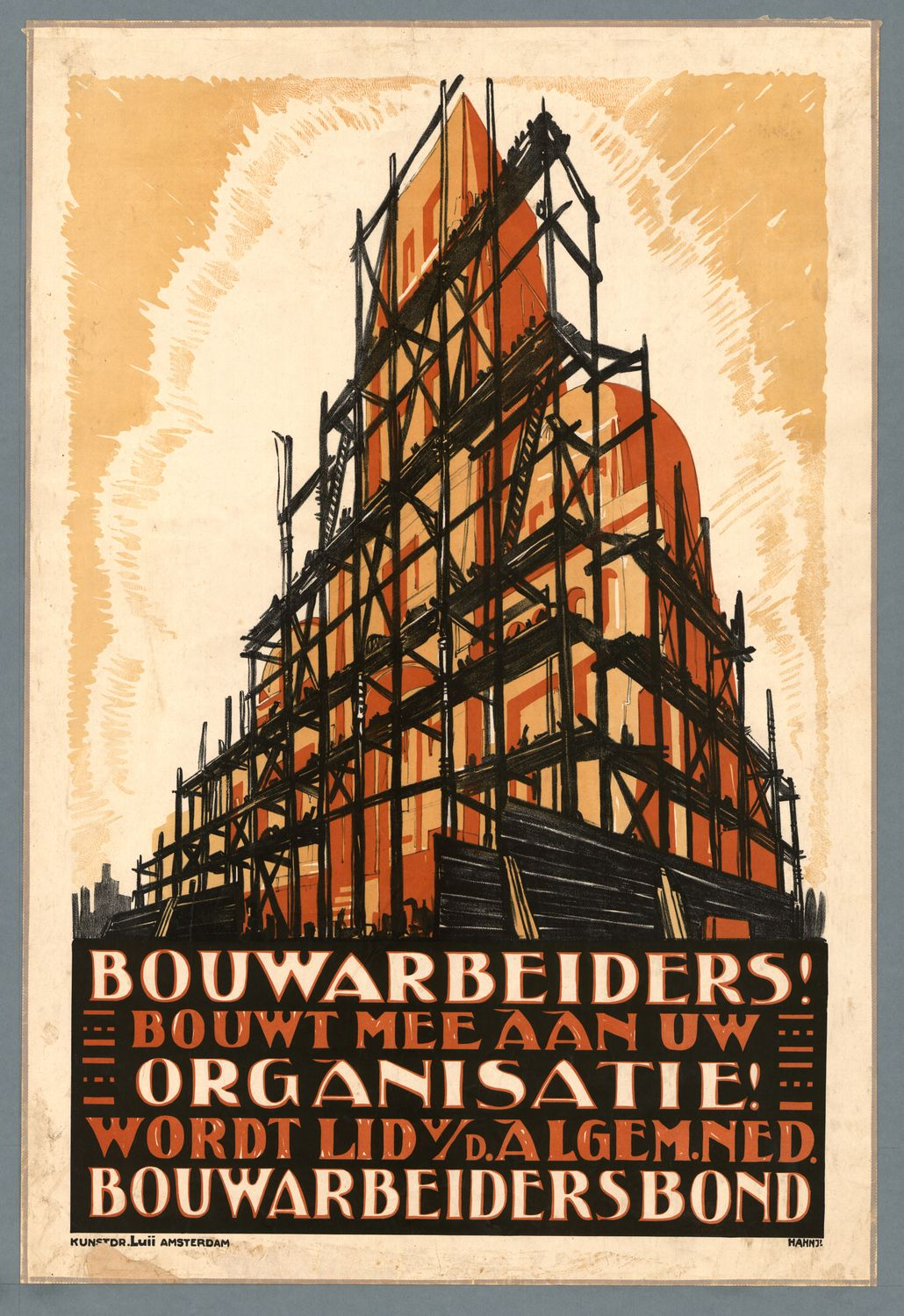
Poster calling on construction workers to unionize, designed by Albert Hahn jr.

The General Dutch Construction Union (Dutch: Algemeen Nederlandsche Bond van Bouwbedrijfsbond, ANB) was a trade union representing workers in the construction industry in the Netherlands.

== History ==
The union was founded on 11 January 1920, when the General Dutch Carpenters' Union merged with the Central Union of Building Workers, establishing the General Dutch Building Workers' Union. On formation, it had 21,678 members. Like both its forerunners, it affiliated to the Dutch Confederation of Trade Unions (NVV). In 1941, the Dutch Painters' Assistants' Union and the General Dutch Plasterers' Union both merged in.

== Affiliation ==
In 1951, the NVV reorganised its affiliates, to form industrial unions. The union began representing office workers in the construction industry, and in 1952 adopted its final name. By 1969, the union had 86,932 members.

== Merger ==
On 1 January 1970, it merged with the General Industrial Union of Furniture Makers and Woodworkers, to form the General Dutch Union of the Building and Wood Industries.

== Presidents ==
1920: Joop van der Wal
1949: Cor Brandsma
1963: Bram Buijs
