= Industrial Union of Agriculture and Food =

Dutch trade union

The Industrial Union of Agriculture and Food (Dutch: Algemene Bedrijfsbond Voedings- en Genotmiddelen, ABVG) was a trade union representing workers in the farming and food processing industries in the Netherlands.

The union was founded in 1970, when the General Dutch Industrial Union of Agriculture merged with the General Union of the Food and Stimulant Industries. Like both its predecessors, it affiliated to the Dutch Confederation of Trade Unions (NVV). In 1976, it formed a federation with the Catholic Union of Agriculture, Food and Tobacco (AVG).

By 1980, the union had 31,591 members. Later in the year, it merged fully with the AVG, to form the Food Workers' Union.

== Presidents ==
1970: Ab Kuiper
1976: Cees Schelling
