= Industrial Workers' Union =

Dutch trade union

The Industrial Workers' Union (Dutch: Industriebond, IB) was a general union focused on workers in heavy industry in the Netherlands.

The union was founded in December 1980, with the merger of the Industrial Workers' Union NVV and the Industrial Workers' Union NKV. These unions had previously been affiliated to the Dutch Confederation of Trade Unions (NVV) and Dutch Catholic Trade Union Federation (NKV), respectively, but the two federations were in the process of merging to form the Dutch Federation of Trade Unions (FNV), to which the new union affiliated.

The union's membership fell by more than one-third over the next decade. By 1997, it was down to 251,161 members, although it remained the largest private sector union in the country. 59% of its members worked in the metal industry, 16% in chemicals, 7% in food production, 3% in textiles and clothing, 3% in paper and printing, 2% in personal services, 1% in construction, and 7% in other manufacturing industries.

In 1998, the union merged with the Food Workers' Union, the Services Union, and the Transport Workers' Union, to form the Allied Union.

== Presidents ==
1980: Arie Groenevelt
1983: Dirk Visser
1988: Bé van der Weg
