= General Union of the Food and Stimulant Industries =

The General Union of the Food and Stimulant Industries (Dutch: Algemene Bedrijfsbond Voedings- en Genotmiddelen, ABVG) was a trade union representing workers in the food processing industry in the Netherlands.

The union was founded in 1948, when the General Dutch Union of Workers in the Baking, Chocolate and Sugar Working Industries merged with the Dutch Union of Workers in the Meat and Related Industries. Like both its predecessors, it affiliated to the Dutch Confederation of Trade Unions (NVV).

By 1969, the union had 13,031 members. The following year, it merged with the General Dutch Industrial Union of Agriculture, to form the Industrial Union of Agriculture and Food.

== Presidents ==
J. B. Dinkla
1960s: Charles Nordberg
