= General Dutch Industrial Union of Agriculture =

Dutch trade union

The General Dutch Industrial Union of Agriculture (Dutch: Algemene Nederlandse Agrarische Bedrijfsbond, ANAB) was a trade union representing workers in the agricultural sector in the Netherlands.

The Dutch Confederation of Trade Unions (NVV) was founded in 1906, but none of its affiliates represented agricultural workers. As a result, in 1907, the NVV created the New Dutch Agricultural Workers' Union. In 1908, the Union of Dairy Workers affiliated to the NVV, and the following year, the two unions merged, forming the Federation of Agricultural and Dairy Workers, with 1,087 members. It added "Horticultural" to its name in 1912.

In 1920, the union organised a conference at which the International Landworkers' Federation was established, and it hosted the federation's headquarters until 1924, and again from 1933.

In 1948, the union changed its name to the General Dutch Agricultural Workers' Union, and then in 1952 it became the General Dutch Industrial Union of Agriculture. By 1969, it had 26,548 members. The following year, it merged with the General Union of the Food and Stimulant Industries, to form the Industrial Union of Agriculture and Food.

== Presidents ==
1912: Piet Hiemstra
1938: Jan Hilgenga
1945: J. Lageveen
c.1950: D. Tiggelaar
1962: Sake van der Ploeg
