= Allied Union =

Dutch union

The Allied Union (Dutch: Bondgenoten, Bond) was a general union representing workers in the Netherlands.

== History ==
The union was founded in 1998, with the merger of the Food Workers' Union, the Industrial Workers' Union, the Services Union, and the Transport Workers' Union. Like all its predecessors, it affiliated to the Dutch Federation of Trade Unions (FNV). The merger was intended to increase the co-ordination between union activity in different industries and spur innovative forms of organisation.

On formation, the union had 499,285 members, and was the FNV's largest affiliate. It was organised in eight sectors: agriculture and the environment, services, trade, industry, ICT, metal, transport, and welfare and pensioners. In 1999, the independent Federated Railway Trade Association merged in.

Despite its size, the union struggled, and its financial position weakened. By 2013, membership had fallen to 455,734, and in 2015, it dissolved, its members becoming direct members of the FNV.

== Presidents ==
1998: Henk Krul
1999: Hans de Vries
2002: Henk van der Kolk
2013: Ellen Dekkers
