= Dutch Catholic Metal Workers' Union =

The Dutch Catholic Metal Workers' Union (Dutch: Nederlandse Katholieke Metaalbewerkersbond), known as "Sint Eloy", was a trade union representing metalworkers in the Netherlands.

The union was founded on 20 April 1902. By 1964, it had 50,942 members. The union eventually broadened its remit to cover the electronics industry, and renamed itself as the Dutch Catholic Union of Employees in Metal, Electronics and Related Companies.

For most of its existence, the union was affiliated to the Dutch Catholic Trade Union Federation (NKV). On 1 January 1972, it merged with the Dutch Catholic Clothing and Textile Workers' Union, the Dutch Catholic Mineworkers' Union, and the Dutch Catholic Factory Workers' Union, to form the Industrial Workers' Union NKV.
