= General Industrial Union of Furniture Makers and Woodworkers =

The General Industrial Union of Furniture Makers and Woodworkers (Dutch: Algemene Bedrijfsbond voor Meubilerings- en Houtbedrijven, ABMH) was a trade union representing workers involved in woodworking and furniture making in the Netherlands.

The union was founded on 1 May 1871, as the Dutch Furniture Makers' Union, under the leadership of Bernardus Hermanus Heldt. Later in the year, it was a founding affiliate of the General Dutch Workers' Union, of which Heldt also became the leader. However, in 1893, it left to join the National Labour Secretariat, and then in 1906 was a founding affiliate of the Dutch Confederation of Trade Unions (NVV).

The union affiliated to the International Federation of Woodworkers in 1906, in which it thereafter played a prominent role. In 1908, it absorbed the Dutch Wallpaperers', Upholsterers' and Bedmakers' Union, and renamed itself as the General Dutch Union of Furniture Makers, Wallpaperers and Related Workers. Despite this, its membership remained small, at only 2,285 in 1914.

The NVV reorganised its affiliates as industrial unions in the early 1950s, and in 1952, the union became the ABMH. By 1969, it had 9,724 members, and on 1 January 1971, it merged with the General Dutch Construction Union to form the General Dutch Union of the Building and Wood Industries.

== Presidents ==
1871: Bernardus Heldt
N. Walop
Freek van de Walle
1919: Kees Woudenberg
1929:
c.1950: K. van den Berg
c.1960: H. Scholten
