= Dutch Catholic Factory Workers' Union =

The Dutch Catholic Factory Workers' Union (Dutch: Nederlandse Katholieke Bond van Werknemers in Industriële Bedrijven), also known as "Sint Willibrordus", was a trade union in the Netherlands, representing manufacturing workers.

The union was founded on 17 December 1911, as the Dutch Catholic Factory, Port and Transport Workers Union. It gradually expanded its remit to cover other industries, and in 1917 became the Factory Workers' Union. It absorbed the Glass and Pottery Association and the Dutch Catholic Leather Workers' Union in the 1920s, and by 1964, it had 43,289 members.

For most of its existence, the union was affiliated to the Dutch Catholic Trade Union Federation (NKV). On 1 January 1972, it merged with the Dutch Catholic Union of Employees in Metal, Electronics and Related Companies, the Dutch Catholic Mineworkers' Union, and the Dutch Catholic Clothing and Textile Workers' Union, to form the Industrial Workers' Union NKV.
