= Dutch Catholic Mineworkers' Union =

The Dutch Catholic Mineworkers' Union (Dutch: Nederlandse Katholieke Mijnwerkersbond, NKMB), also known as "Sint Barbara", was a trade union representing coal miners in the Netherlands.

The union was founded in 1907, as the General Union of Christian Miners in the Netherlands. Its main founder was Chris Zielemans, who had previously worked for the United Federation of Christian Trade Unions in Germany. It initially had 969 members, rising to 1,341 in 1912, but falling again to 500 in 1914. In 1922, it broke its links with the German federation, in order to provide unemployment insurance in accordance with Dutch law. In 1925, it was a founding affiliate of the Roman Catholic Workers' Federation, and the following year, it became the NKMB, formally abandoning its interdenominational status.

By 1964, the union had 33,157 members. However, it became clear that industry was in decline. Long-term leader Frans Dohmen focused on facilitating alternative employment for its members, mostly in and around Limburg. On 1 January 1972, it merged with the Dutch Catholic Union of Employees in Metal, Electronics and Related Companies, the Dutch Catholic Clothing and Textile Workers' Union, and the Dutch Catholic Factory Workers' Union, to form the Industrial Workers' Union NKV.
