= Mercurius (trade union) =

Trade union

The General Dutch Association for Trade and Office Clerks and Travelling Salesmen (Dutch: Algemene Nederlandse Bond voor Handels- en Kantoorbedienden en Handelsreizigers, often known as Mercurius, was a trade union representing white collar workers in the Netherlands.

The union was established on 1 October 1940, during World War II. The Nazi occupiers merged the General Dutch Union of Trade and Office Workers, an affiliate of the Dutch Confederation of Trade Unions (NVV), with the independent Mercurius union. Soon after, the union was banned entirely, but it was revived in 1945, and the representatives of the former unions decided to maintain the merger, and to affiliate to the NVV.

In 1947, the union absorbed the Dutch Union of Insurance Agents and Collectors. However, in 1952, when the NVV decided to reorganise its affiliates as industrial unions, it lost many members to unions representing their industries. It took the official name General Union Mercurius, Industrial Union for Trade, Banking and Insurance, and Free Professions. By 1964, it had 31,030 members, and by 1980 this had grown to 61,397. Of these, 47% worked in commerce, 15% in cultural services, 9% in business services, 8% in banking, 6% in social services, and 4% in public administration.

In 1977, the union became the Services Union, while still remaining popularly known as "Mercurius". It formed a federation with the rival Services Union NKV in 1975, and the two unions merged completely in 1981, forming the Services Union.

== Presidents ==
1945: A. J. Wamsteeker
1960: C. Z. de Vries
c.1970: Jan Brouwer
