= General Education Union =

The General Education Union (Dutch: Algemene Onderwijsbond, AOb) is a trade union representing teachers, lecturers and support staff in education, in the Netherlands.

The union was founded on 1 January 1997, when the General Union of Education Personnel merged with Dutch Association of Teachers. It affiliated to the Federation of Dutch Trade Unions. By 1998, it had 72,206 members, and in 2008, this had grown slightly, to 77,943.

At the start of 2020, the union absorbed Vawo, a union for university researchers.

== Presidents ==
1997: Jacques Tichelaar
2002: Walter Dresscher
2015: Liesbeth Verheggen
2019: Eugenie Stolk
2021: Tamar van Gelder
2023: Thijs Roovers
2025: Coba van der Veer
