= General Trade Union Federation =

The General Trade Union Federation (Dutch: Algemene Vakcentrale, AVC) was a national trade union centre in the Netherlands.

The AVC was founded in June 1987, for civil servants who did not wish to join the larger social democratic or Christian federations. It was organised on the initiative of the Civil Service Centre, and it attracted affiliates including the General Association of School Leaders, the Association of Technical Civil Servants, the Dutch Association of Municipal Civil Servants, the Independent Education Trade Organisation, and the Black Corps.

By 1995, the union had 105,833 members. The important Federation of Government Personnel left that year to found the rival Association of Autonomous Trade Unions, leaving the federation with a single affiliate, the Dutch Independent Union of Public and Non-Profit Workers (NOVON). In 1997, the federation was dissolved, and NOVON joined the Federation of Dutch Trade Unions.
