= General Dutch Printing Union =

Dutch trade union

The General Dutch Printing Union (Dutch: Algemene Nederlandse Grafische Bond, ANGB) was a trade union representing workers in the printing industry in the Netherlands.

The union was founded in 1945, when the General Dutch Graphic Union merged with the Dutch Litho-, Photo- and Chemographers' Union, the General Dutch Typographers' Union, and the Dutch Union of Managers in the Graphic Industry. Like all its predecessors, it affiliated to the Dutch Association of Trade Unions (NVV). In 1981, it had 32,743 members.

In 1976, the NVV merged with its Catholic counterpart, to form the Dutch Federation of Trade Unions, and in 1982, the ANGB similarly merged with the Dutch Catholic Printing Union, to form the Printing and Paper Union.
