= International Secretariat of Painters and Allied Trades =

The International Secretariat of Painters and Allied Trades, also known as the International Secretariat of Painters and Kindred Trades, was a global union federation bringing together trade unions representing painters and decorators.

== History ==
The first international conference of painters' trade unions was held in Leipzig in 1907, and a second was held in Munich in 1911. This conference agreed to form an international trade federation, which was launched at a further conference, in Zürich, later in the year.

The federation was initially based in Hamburg, and by 1925 it had 11 affiliates, with a total of 181,536 members. Its headquarters moved to Amsterdam in the early 1930s, and by 1935 it had affiliates in Austria, Czechoslovakia, Denmark, Finland, Germany, Hungary, the Netherlands, Norway, Sweden, Switzerland, the United Kingdom, and the United States, with a total of 237,531 members.

On 1 January 1947, the federation merged into the International Federation of Building and Wood Workers.

== Affiliates ==
As of 1922, the following unions were affiliated:

Union	Country	Membership
	Austria	4,098
	Czechoslovakia	1,758
Danish Painters' Union	Denmark	5,391
	Finland	962
German Painters' Union	Germany	58,829
	Hungary	2,458
Dutch Painters' Assistants' Union	Netherlands	6,192
	Norway	1,106
Swedish Painters' Union	Sweden	3,802
Swiss Construction Workers' Union	Switzerland	2,018

== General Secretaries ==
1911: Albert Tobler
1914: Otto Streine
1928: Hans Batz
1933: A. J. Dooyes
