= Agnes Jongerius =

Dutch trade unionist and politician

Agnes Jongerius MEP
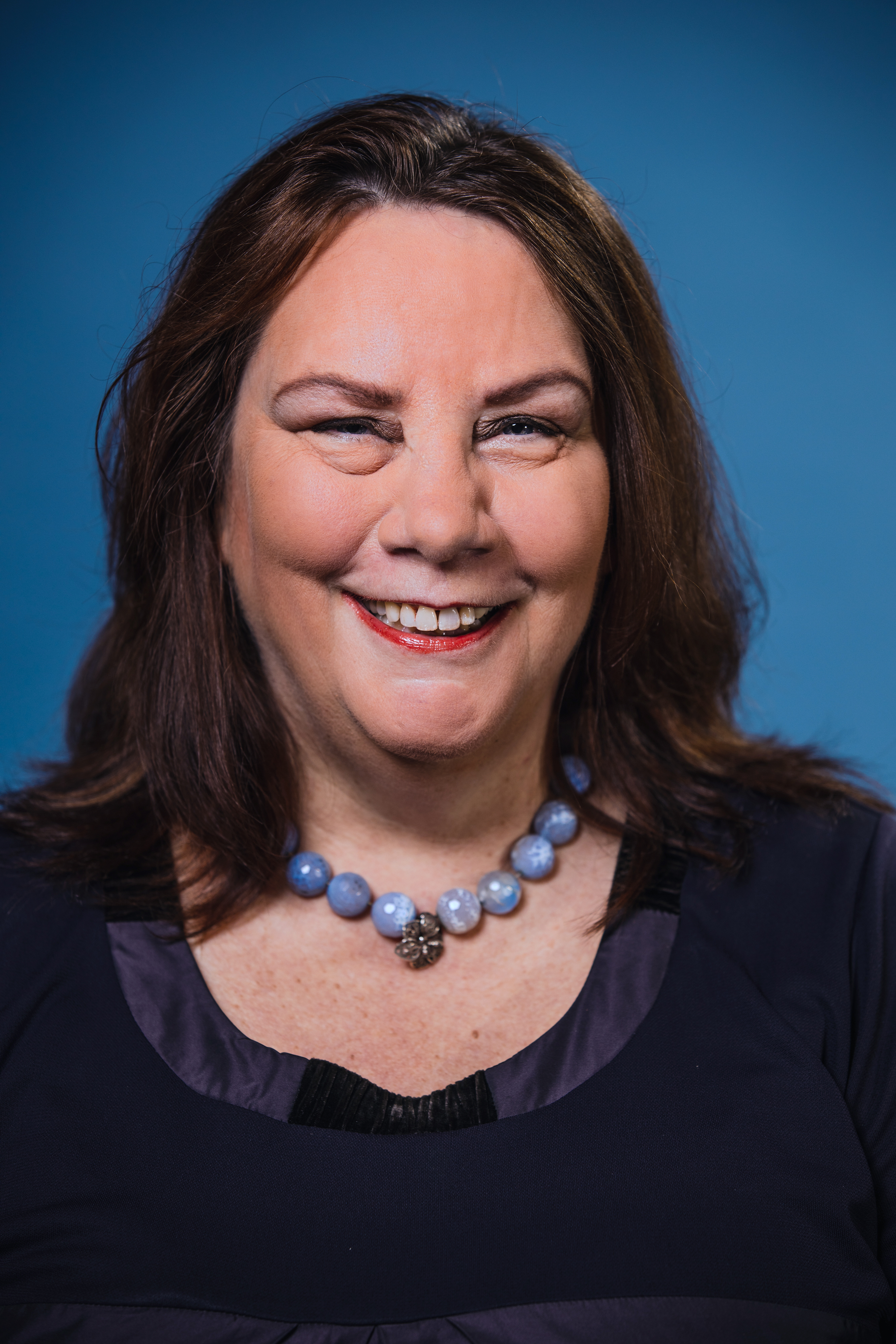
- Jongerius in 2020

Member of the European Parliament
- In office 1 July 2014 – 15 July 2024
- Constituency: Netherlands

Personal details
- Born: Agnes Jongerius; 4 November 1960 (age 65) De Meern, Netherlands
- Party: Labour Party
- Education: Utrecht University

Agnes Maria Jongerius (Note: The phrase Agnes Jongerius is pronounced [ˈɑxnɛ ɕɔŋˈɣeːrijʏs]. The words in isolation are pronounced [ˈɑxnɛs] and [jɔŋˈɣeːrijʏs].) (born 4 November 1960) is a Dutch trade unionist and politician who was a Member of the European Parliament (MEP) for the Netherlands between July 2014 and July 2024. She is a member of the Labour Party, part of the Progressive Alliance of Socialists and Democrats. Between 1987 and 2012 she worked for the Federatie Nederlandse Vakbeweging, a trade union federation. She was chair of the federation between 2005 and 2012.

== Career ==
Jongerius was born in the De Meern neighbourhood in the city of Utrecht in 1960. Her father worked as a gardener. She went to the Bonifatius Lyceum, a gymnasium in the city of Utrecht between 1973 and 1979. In that latter year she went to Utrecht University to study social-economic history, graduating cum laude in 1988.

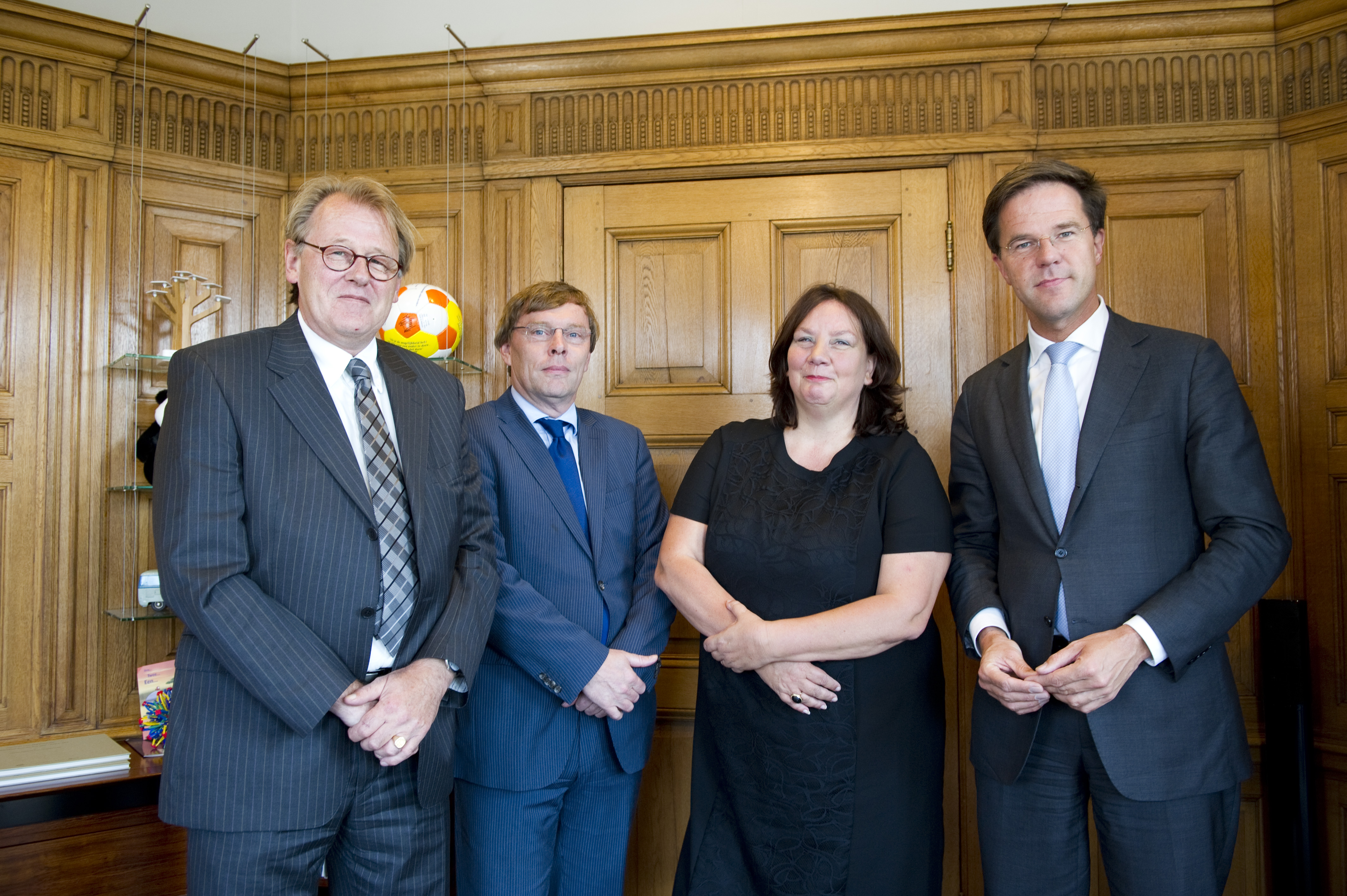
Union leaders Jaap Smit (CNV), Bob van der Wal (MHP), and Agnes Jongerius (FNV) with prime minister Mark Rutte in 2012

One year before her graduation she started working for the Federation of Dutch Trade Unions (FNV). She became a board member of the Transport Workers' Union, an FNV member organization, in 1997, and she started serving as an FNV board member and collective agreement coordinator in 2002. Jongerius was appointed vice chair two years later. She was the FNV's first female chair between 25 May 2005 and 23 June 2012, and she was vice chair of the International Trade Union Confederation for the last five of those years. In 2009, feminist magazine Opzij named Jongerius the most powerful Dutch woman of the year, citing her role at FNV during the economic crisis.

== Political career ==
In September 2013 information surfaced that Jongerius wanted to become the new mayor of Utrecht, to succeed Aleid Wolfsen. Jongerius did not want to respond to the claims. Jan van Zanen was later named mayor.

=== Member of the European Parliament, 2014–2024 ===
Jongerius occupied the second place on the Labour Party list for the European Parliament elections of 2014, after Paul Tang. She was elected to the European Parliament in May 2014, and she served as the party's spokesperson for social affairs and employment. Her focus was on decreasing the amount of flexible employment contracts in favor of fixed ones.

In the European Parliament Jongerius was vice-chair of the Committee on Employment and Social Affairs and member of the Delegation for relations with the countries of Southeast Asia and the Association of Southeast Asian Nations (ASEAN). In addition to her committee assignments, Jongerius was a member of the European Parliament Intergroup on Trade Unions, the URBAN Intergroup and the European Parliament Intergroup on LGBT Rights.

Following the 2019 elections, Jongerius was part of a cross-party working group in charge of drafting the European Parliament's four-year work program on digitization. She decided not to run for re-election in June 2024, and her term ended on 15 July 2024. During her membership of the European Parliament, Jongerius served as a supervisory board member of PostNL (2013–18) and the Atria Institute (2014–24), which is specialized in gender equality and women's history. She was chairwoman of the latter.

== Personal life ==
Jongerius is a Catholic, and her partner is VPRO journalist Ger Jochems. While an MEP, she lived in Utrecht.

== Electoral history ==
Electoral history of Hedy d'Ancona
Year	Body	Party	Pos.	Votes	Result		Ref.
Year	Body	Party	Pos.	Votes	Party seats	Individual	Ref.
2014	European Parliament	Labour Party	2			Won	
2018	Utrecht Municipal Council	Labour Party	19 (Note: Jongerius participated as a lijstduwer.)			Lost	
2019	European Parliament	Labour Party	2	109,987		Won	
2022	Utrecht Municipal Council	Labour Party	38		99	Lost	
2025	House of Representatives	GroenLinks–PvdA	76	542	20	Lost	
