= Dutch Catholic Union of Building Workers =

The Dutch Catholic Union of Building Workers (Dutch: Nederlandse Katholieke Bond van Werknemers in de Bouwnijverheid), known as "Sint Joseph", was a trade union representing construction workers in the Netherlands.

The union was founded in 1917, and in 1925 it was a founding affiliate of the Roman Catholic Workers' Federation. By 1964, it was the largest affiliate of the Dutch Catholic Trade Union Federation, with 74,348 members. In 1971, it merged with the smaller Dutch Roman Catholic Union of Woodworkers, Furniture Makers, Wallpaperers, and Related Trades, to form the Dutch Catholic Union of the Building and Wood Industries.
