= Henk Oosterhuis =

Dutch trade unionist and politician

Hendrik Oosterhuis MP
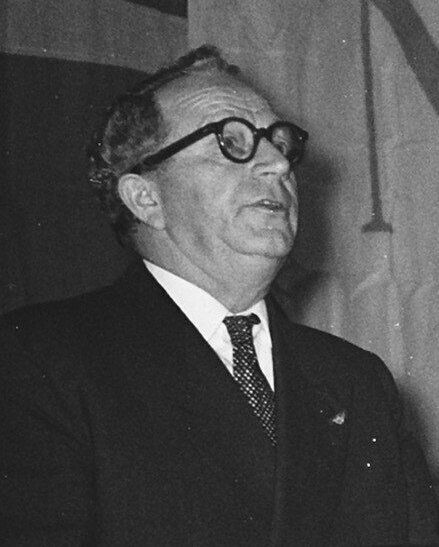

Senate of the Netherlands
- In office 23 July 1946 – 20 September 1960

Member of the Senate

Personal details
- Born: 20 April 1893
- Died: 21 January 1962 (aged 68)

Hendrik (Henk) Oosterhuis was a Dutch trade unionist and politician who represented the Labour Party and its predecessor the Social Democratic Workers' Party. Originally from Groningen, Oosterhuis served in the Senate from 1946 until 1960 and held numerous positions within the labour movement, including Chair of the Dutch Confederation of Trade Unions (NVV) and President of the Trade Union Advisory Committee to the OECD (TUAC).
