= Union of Dutch Teachers =

The Union of Dutch Teachers (Dutch: Bond van Nederlandsche Onderwijzers, BNO) was a trade union representing schoolteachers in the Netherlands.

The union was founded in 1874 as the Public Assistant Teachers' Association, with 267 members in four cities. Its founders were a group of teachers who were not senior enough to be permitted to join the existing trade association, the Dutch Education Society (NOV). From 1878, it represented all teachers, and changed its name to the Dutch Public Educators' and Head Teachers' Association, but membership declined, until the union was only active in Amsterdam and Rotterdam.

From 1888, the union was reinvigorated. It adopted De Bode, journal of the Amsterdam branch, as a national journal, and began recruiting across the country. The following year, it became the "Union of Dutch Teachers", becoming the first teachers' organisation in the country to identify itself as a trade union. It promoted smaller class sizes and more widespread entitlement to free education, with universal compulsory education being achieved in 1900.

Membership of the union reached 6,000 in 1901. From 1921, its leading figure was Theo Thijssen. In 1924, it affiliated to the Dutch Confederation of Trade Unions (NVV). The union attempted to maintain its activities under the Nazi occupation in World War II, which led to heavy criticism from the NVV after the liberation. In 1946, it merged with the NOV, to form the Dutch Teachers' Association.
