= Dutch Catholic Clothing and Textile Workers' Union =

The Dutch Catholic Clothing and Textile Workers' Union (Dutch: Nederlandse Katholieke Kleding- en Textielarbeidersbond), known as "Sint Lambertus", was a trade union representing workers in two linked industries in the Netherlands.

The union was founded in 1895, and initially only represented textile workers. By 1964, it had 23,143 members.

For most of its existence, the union was affiliated to the Dutch Catholic Trade Union Federation (NKV). On 1 January 1972, it merged with the Dutch Catholic Union of Employees in Metal, Electronics and Related Companies, the Dutch Catholic Mineworkers' Union, and the Dutch Catholic Factory Workers' Union, to form the Industrial Workers' Union NKV.
