= Transport and General Workers' Union (disambiguation) =

The Transport and General Workers' Union is the name of:

- Communication, Transport and General Workers Union, trade union in Trinidad and Tobago
- Irish Transport and General Workers' Union, former trade union in Ireland
- Scottish Transport and General Workers' Union (Docks), former trade union in Scotland
- Transport and General Workers' Union, former trade union in the UK and Ireland
- Transport and General Workers' Union (South Africa), former trade union in South Africa

== See also ==
- Transport Workers Union (disambiguation)
