= Catering Union =

Dutch trade union

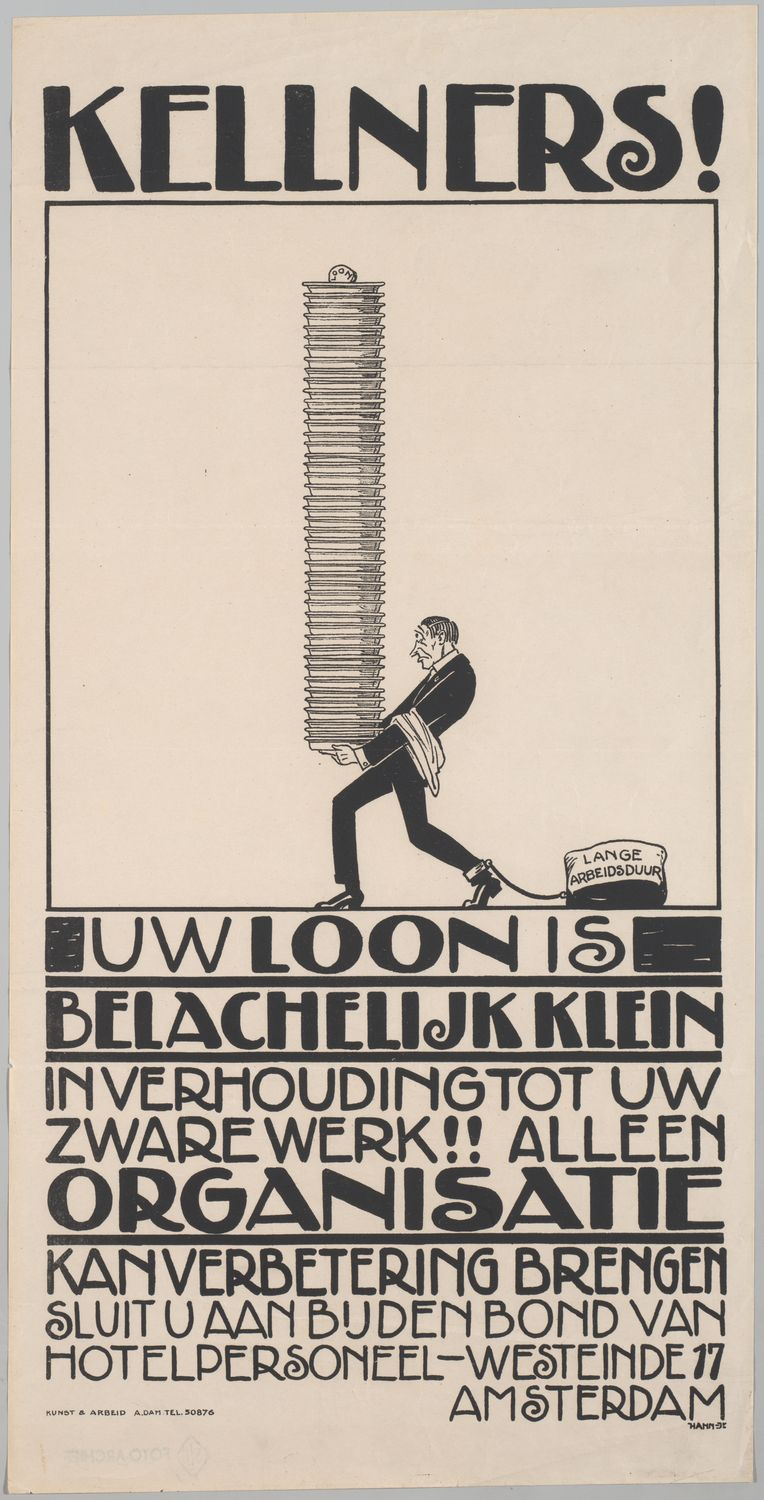
Poster calling on waiters to unionize, designed by Albert Hahn jr.

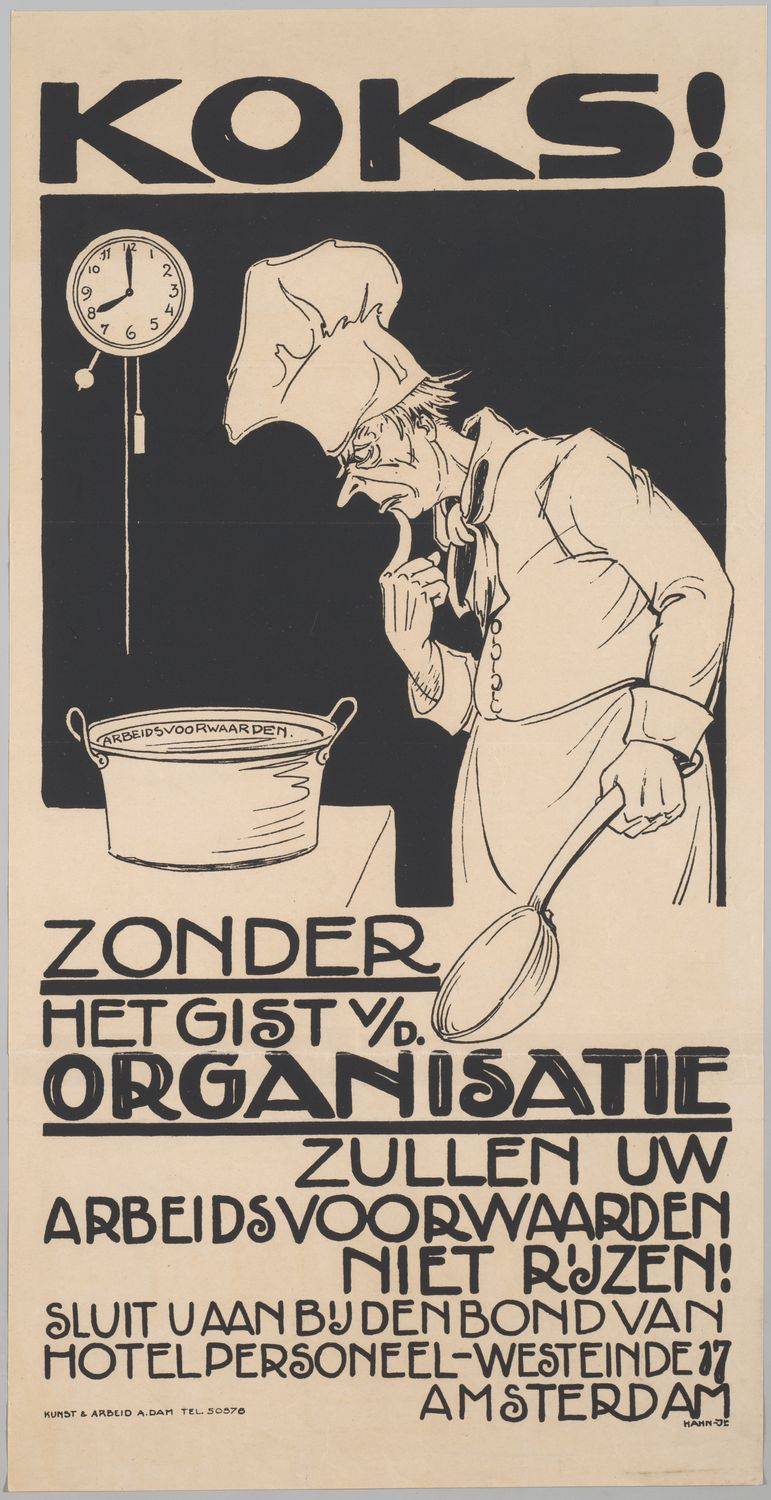
Poster calling on kooks to unionize, designed by Albert Hahn jr.

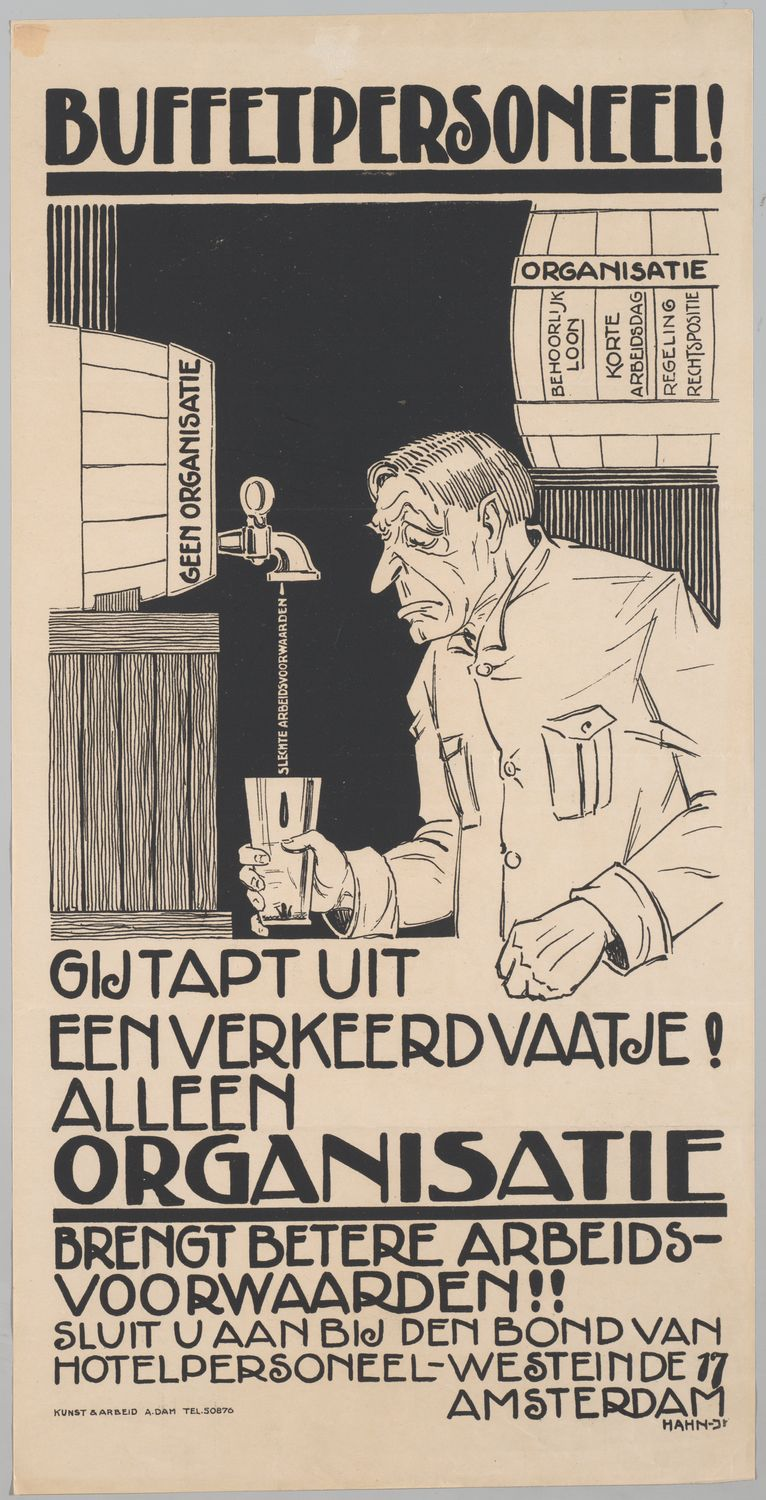
Poster calling on buffet staff to unionize, designed by Albert Hahn jr.

The Catering Union (Dutch: Horecabond) is a trade union representing workers in the hospitality sector in the Netherlands.

The union was founded in 1919, with the merger of the Dutch Central Union of Personnel in the Hotel, Cafe and Restaurant Business, the Dutch Chefs' Union, and the Dutch Geneva Union of Hotel, Cafe and Restaurant Staff. It was originally named the Union of Hotel, Cafe and Restaurant Personnel in the Netherlands, and it affiliated to the Dutch Confederation of Trade Unions (NVV).

In the 1930s, the union formed a federation with the Dutch Roman Catholic Union of Hotel, Cafe and Restaurant Employees. By 1964, the union had 6,208 members. The union was later renamed the Dutch Union of Hotel, Cafe and Restaurant Personnel, and it transferred to the Federation of Dutch Trade Unions (FNV) when the NVV merged into it.

The former Roman Catholic Union had become part of the Food Workers' Union, and in the 1970s and 1980s, the two unions competed to represent workers in the sector. However, in 1989, the Food Workers' Union agreed to transfer its hospitality workers over to the Dutch Union of Hotel, Cafe and Restaurant Staff, which renamed itself as the "Catering Union". By 2008, the union had 25,045 members.

== Presidents ==
J. C. B. van Hilst
1952: Joop Wagener
1976: Paul Abraas
2002: Marchien Koster
2009: Ben Francooy
2018: Dick Koerselman
