= Arts Union (Netherlands) =

Trade union

The Arts Union (Dutch: Kunstenbond) is a trade union representing workers in the creative sector in the Netherlands.

Until 2015, creative workers were represented by the Arts, Information and Media Union (KIEM), an affiliate of the Federation of Dutch Trade Unions (FNV). KIEM decided to dissolve into the FNV, but the arts sector preferred instead to remain an independent union, affiliated to the FNV. On 1 July 2016, the Arts Union was formed.

In 2018, the union absorbed the Dutch Musical Artists' Union, which became its music section. Since then, it has represented designers, musicians, dancers, photographers, sculptors, art teachers, lighting technicians, production managers, and those in related roles. By 2019, the union had about 8,000 members.
