= Dutch Painters' Assistants' Union =

Dutch trade union

The Dutch Painters' Assistants' Union (Dutch: Nederlandse Schilders Gezellenbond, NSGB) was a trade union representing workers in the painting and decorating trade in the Netherlands.

The union was founded in the early 1900s and was an early affiliate of the Dutch Confederation of Trade Unions (NVV). By 1921, it has 6,076 members. While relatively small, it played a leading role in the International Secretariat of Painters and Allied Trades, and from 1937 provided its general secretary, A. J. Dooyes.

During the Nazi occupation of the Netherlands, the union was taken under Nazi control. On 1 March 1941, the union was merged into the General Dutch Construction Union. After the war, the NVV was reformed, but decided not to re-establish the NSGB.
