= General Dutch Typographers' Union =

Dutch trade union

The General Dutch Typographers' Union (Dutch: Algemene Nederlandse Typografenbond, ANTB) was an early trade union, representing typographers in the Netherlands.

The union was founded on 30 May 1866, the first national trade union in the Netherlands. It aimed to increase minimum wages from 6 to 9 guilders per ten-hour day. Despite attempts by employers to sack union members, the union endured. In later years, it was affiliated to the Dutch Confederation of Trade Unions (NVV).

In 1945, it merged with the Dutch Graphical Union, the Dutch Litho-, Photo- and Chemographers' Union, and the Dutch Union of Managers in the Graphic Industry, to form the General Dutch Printing Union.

== Presidents ==
- 1894: Paulus Hols
- 1914: Feike van der Wal
- 1937: Barend Ponstein
