= General Dutch Metalworkers' Union =

Dutch trade union

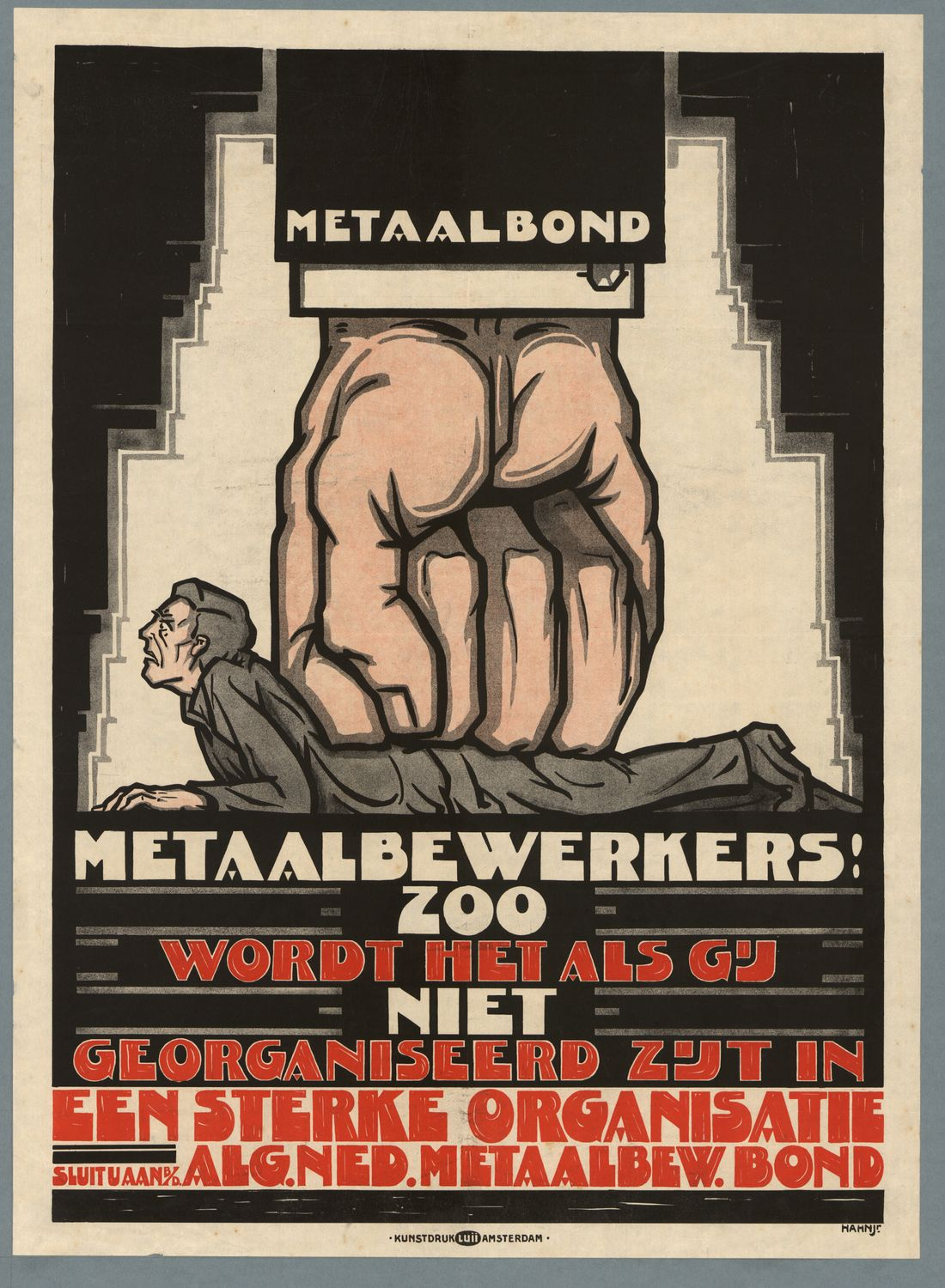
Poster designed by Albert Hahn jr., 1920

The General Dutch Metalworkers' Union (Dutch: Algemene Nederlandse Metaalbewerkersbond, ANMB) was a trade union representing workers in the metal industry in the Netherlands.

The union was founded in 1886, and in 1906, it was a founding affiliate of the Dutch Confederation of Trade Unions (NVV). In 1951, it was renamed as the General Dutch Metal Industry Union, and in 1956, as the General Dutch Industrial Union for the Metal and Electrical Industries. In 1958, the General Dutch Diamond Workers' Union merged into the union.

By 1970, the union had 112,072 members. On 1 January 1972, it merged with the General Union of Miscellaneous Industries and the General Industrial Union of Textiles and Clothing, to form the Industrial Workers' Union NVV.

== Presidents ==
1910: W. F. Dekkers
1916: Piet Danz
1936: Henk van den Born
1950: Kees van Wingerden
1953: D. W. van Hattum
1959: Ies Baart
1965: Maarten Zondervan
1970: Arie Groenevelt
