= Printing and Paper Union (Netherlands) =

Trade union in the Netherlands

The Printing and Paper Union (Dutch: Druk en Papier, D&P) was a trade union representing people in the printing and papermaking industries in the Netherlands.

In 1978, the Dutch Catholic Printing Union and the General Dutch Printing Union formed the D&P as a federation. In 1982, both the unions merged fully into the D&P. Like both its predecessors, it affiliated to the Federation of Dutch Trade Unions.

By 1996, the union had 42,557 members. In 1998, it merged with the Arts Union, to form the Arts, Information and Media Union.

== Presidents ==
1982: René van Tilborg
