= Industrial Workers' Union NVV =

Dutch general workers union

The Industrial Workers' Union NVV (Dutch: Industriebond-NVV, IB-NVV) was a general union focused on workers in heavy industry in the Netherlands.

The union was founded on 1 January 1972, when the General Dutch Industrial Union of the Metal and Electronic Industries merged with the General Union of Miscellaneous Industries, and the General Industrial Union of Textiles and Clothing. Like all its predecessors, it affiliated to the Dutch Confederation of Trade Unions (NVV).

By 1980, the union had 174,472 members, of whom 66% worked in the metal industry, 15% in chemicals, 6% in food production, 3% in ceramics and glass, 3% in paper and printing, 3% in textiles and clothing, 2% in personal services, and the remainder in other areas of manufacturing. In December 1980, the union merged with the rival Industrial Workers' Union NKV, to form the Industrial Workers' Union.

== Presidents ==
1971: Arie Groenevelt
