= Abvakabo =

Dutch trade union

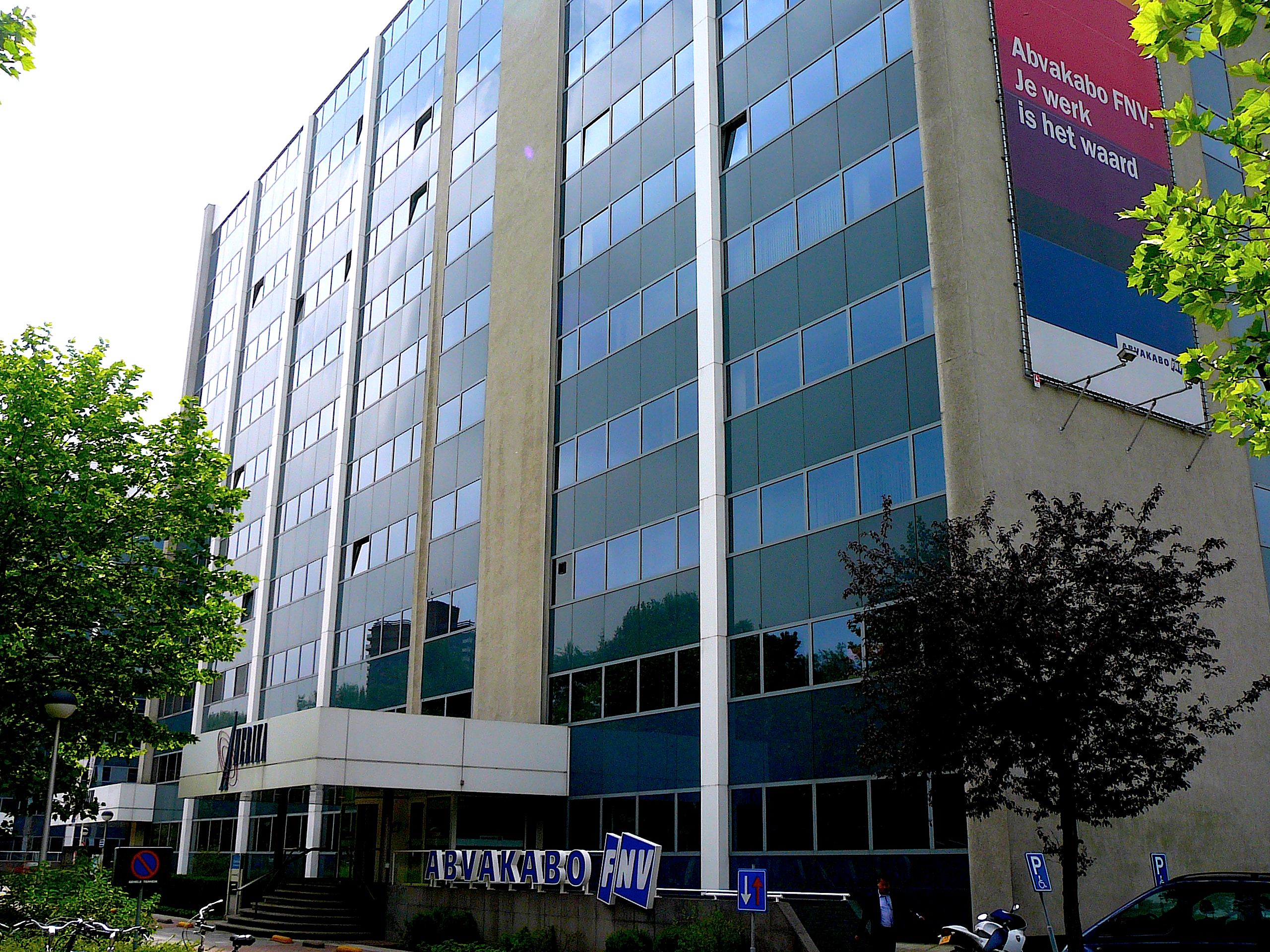

Abvakabo was a trade union representing public sector and postal workers in the Netherlands.

The union was founded in 1982, when the General Union of Civil Servants (ABVA) merged with the Catholic Union of Government Personnel (KABO). It affiliated to the Federation of Dutch Trade Unions (FNV). In its early years, the union strongly opposed privatisation and plans to reduce the number of civil servants, leading high profile industrial action. In 1988, it led successful protests for improved pay and conditions in the health and welfare sectors.

Membership of the union grew steadily, from 255,000 members in 1982, to 359,446 in 1998. At this time, 38% worked in administration, 24% in healthcare, 14% in communication, 6% in education, 6% in utilities, and the remainder in a wide range of fields. By the 1990s, more than half of the union's members were women. In 1998, the Dutch Independent Union of Public and Non-Profit Workers merged into Abvakabo.

In 2015, the union dissolved, its members becoming direct members of the FNV.

== Presidents ==
1982: Jaap van de Scheur
1990: Cees Vrins
2005: Edith Snoey
2011: Corrie van Brenk
