= General Federation of Military Personnel =

The General Federation of Military Personnel (Dutch: Algemene Federatie van Militair Personeel, AFMP) is a trade union representing members of the armed forces of the Netherlands.

The union was founded in 1992, when Ons Belang merged with the Association for Military Technical and Specialist Professional Personnel, and the General Military Pension Association. The union affiliated to the Federation of Dutch Trade Unions. By 1998, the union had 19,956 members, and in 2008 this had grown to 24,684.
