= Catholic Union of Agriculture, Food and Tobacco =

Dutch Christian trade union

The Catholic Union of Personnel in Agriculture, Food and Beverage, Tobacco Processing, Catering and Related Industries (Dutch: Katholieke Bond van Personeel in de Agrarische, Voedings- en Genotmiddelen-, Tabakverwerkende, Horeca- en Aanverwante Bedrijven, AVG) was a trade union representing workers in various related industries in the Netherlands.

The union was founded on 25 June 1968, when the Dutch Catholic Agricultural Workers' Union merged with the Dutch Catholic Union of Workers in the Food and Beverage Industries, the Dutch Catholic Tobacco Union, and the Dutch Catholic Union of Hotel, Cafe and Restaurant Employees. Like all its predecessors, it affiliated to the Dutch Catholic Trade Union Federation. In 1976, it formed a federation with the rival Industrial Union of Agriculture and Food (ABVG).

By 1980, the union had 18,775 members, 72% of whom worked in food production, 15% in agriculture, and 13% in catering. Later in the year, it merged with the ABVG, to form the Food Workers' Union.
