= Trade Union Federation for Professionals =

The Trade Union Federation for Professionals (Dutch: Vakcentrale voor Professionals, VCP) is a national trade union centre bringing together unions representing managers and professionals in the Netherlands.

The federation was established in 1974, as the Federation of Middle and Higher Personnel. By 1998, it had only four affiliates, of which, the Dutch Central Organisation of Middle and Higher Personnel, and the Central Union of Middle and Higher Civil Servants and Staff were federations of smaller unions. It became the VHP in 2014, and it is affiliated to the European Trade Union Confederation. Its current affiliates include:

- Police Union ACP
- ANBO
- CMHF
- De Unie
- The Black Corps (HZC)
- Synergo-vhp
- UOV
- VKP
- VHP2
- VHP Tata Steel
- VNV
