= Federation of Dutch Trade Unions =

Dutch national trade union centre

FNV
- Dutch Federation of Trade Unions
- Federatie Nederlandse Vakbeweging
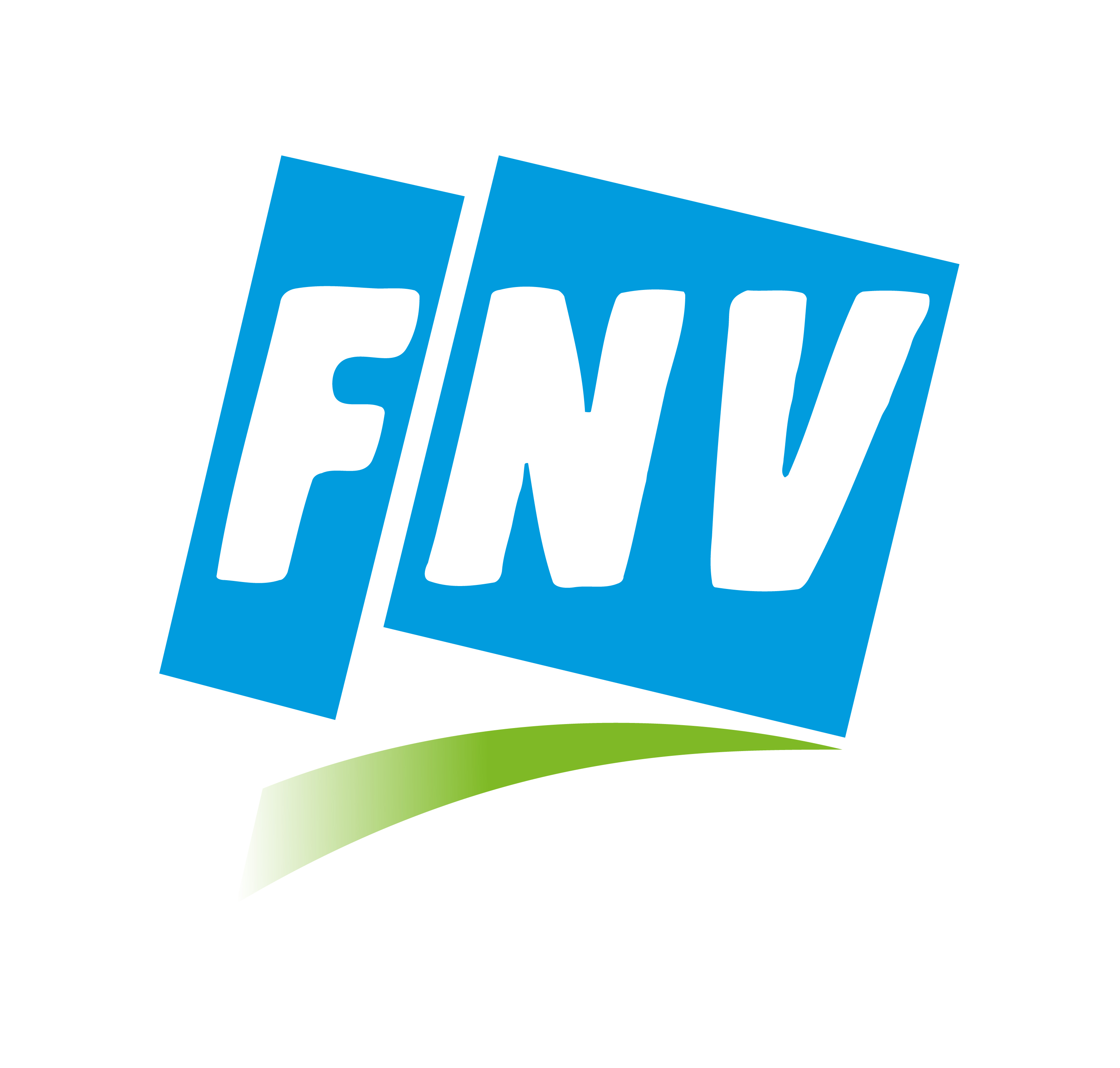
- Founded: 1976
- Headquarters: Utrecht
- Location: Netherlands
- Members: 1.000.000
- Affiliations: ITUC, ETUC
- Website: www.fnv.nl

The Federation of Dutch Trade Unions (Dutch: Federatie Nederlandse Vakbeweging, FNV) is a national trade union centre in the Netherlands. The FNV is a significant player in the field of work and income. The trade union consists of a central federation, complemented by several sectoral unions representing specific professional groups and sectors. The FNV aims to safeguard the interests of employees, promote fair labor conditions, and protect workers' rights at the national level.

== History ==
The FNV was founded in 1976 from the merger of the Dutch Catholic Trade Union Federation (NKV) and the social-democratic Dutch Confederation of Trade Unions (NVV). The Protestant Christian National Trade Union Federation (CNV) originally also participated in the talks, but it refused to fully merge into a new union. The federation was founded because of declining membership, due to depillarisation and increasing political polarisation between left and right. The first president of the FNV was Wim Kok, who had been chair of NVV since 1973. He remained its leader until 1986, when he entered parliament for the Dutch Labour Party. The NKV and the NVV dissolved themselves into the FNV at the start of 1982.

The FNV was crucial in the economic recovery in the Netherlands during the 1980s. It supported the so-called Wassenaar Agreement, where employee accepted lower wages in exchange for more employment. During the 1990s the FNV came into a heavy conflict over reforms of the WAO, the disabled act, with the cabinet Lubbers-III, in which the party's former chair, Kok, was vice-prime minister. The proposals were consequently dropped.

In the 2000s the FNV came into conflict with the Second Balkenende cabinet over the AOW, the old aged act, and the WAO, the disabilities act. A huge protest was organized in Amsterdam in 2004. The FNV became a leading member in "Keer het Tij" (Turn the Tide) an alliance of social organizations that opposed the cabinet and became involved in organizing the Dutch Social Forum, the Dutch branch of the World Social Forum in 2004 and 2006.

In 2012 the FNV almost split due to a conflict between the more radical wing and the moderates on the issue of pensions. The split was averted, but led to a complete overhaul of the organizational model of the FNV. In late 2014, the largest three affiliates of the FNV, the Allied Union, Construction and Wood Union, and Abvakabo, dissolved into the federation.

== Activities ==
The most important function of FNV are the collective bargaining negotiations, on wages and secondary working conditions, it holds with the employers' federations. It also advises government through the Social Economic Council in which other trade unions, employers' organizations and government appointed experts also have seats.

The Collective Labour Agreement (CAO) is an important instrument used by the FNV to represent the interests of employees and ensure their employment conditions. Over two million employees in the Netherlands are covered by a CAO negotiated by the FNV, which represents the interests of workers in various sectors.

In addition to negotiating collective labour agreements, the FNV also provides extensive individual legal assistance to its members in cases involving work or income-related issues. Workers who find themselves in a conflict with their employers can rely on legal support from FNV lawyers.

Another service offered by the FNV to its members is assistance in cases of personal injury and occupational diseases. Employees who suffer injuries during their work or are affected by diseases resulting from their profession can count on the expertise of the FNV to defend their rights.

Furthermore, the FNV provides the FNV Belastingservice (FNV Tax Service), an ISO-certified service department that works for all unions affiliated with the FNV. Around 4,250 volunteers handled approximately 215,000 tax returns for FNV members in 2016. These volunteers are trained by 350 instructors who receive annual updates themselves. As a result, the FNV Belastingservice is the largest tax consultant service in the Netherlands.

== Organisation ==
The FNV is both a labour union (consisting of different sectors) as well as a labour federation (with affiliated independent unions). Both these sectors and affiliated unions are represented in the FNV parliament, which is directly elected by the membership. The number of seats per sector/affiliated union is determined by their membership in proportion to the total membership of the FNV. The parliament represents the membership, creates "overarching" policy and oversees the board. The parliament also elects the board (except the chairman, who is directly elected by the membership). The current chairman is Hans Spekman.

== Affiliates ==
=== Current affiliates ===
Name	Abbreviation	Founded	Represents	Seats in parliament	Membership (2008)
Association of Contract Players	VVCS	1961	Football players	1	N/A
Beauty Union	Mooi	1932	Barbers and beauty parlors	1	N/A
Catering Union	Horeca	1940	Hotels, recreation and catering	2	25,045
Dutch Community Support Officers' Union	NBB	2014	Community support officers	0	N/A
Dutch Police Union	NPB	1946	Police	2	23,000
Dutch Union of Journalists	NVJ	1884	Journalists	1	9,000
General Education Union	AOb	1997	Teachers	8	77,943
General Federation of Military Personnel	AFMP	1992	Military	2	24,684
Marechaussee Union	MARVER	1907	Royal Marechaussee	1	N/A
Nautilus International	Nautilus	2009	Seafaring	1	6,200
NL Athletes	NL Sporter	2001	Professional athletes (excluding football players)	1	N/A
Women's Union	Vrouw	1981	Women	1	4,202

=== Former affiliates ===
Union	Abbreviation	Founded	Left	Reason not affiliated	Membership (1982)
Abvakabo	ABVA-KABO	1982	2014	Dissolved into FNV	248,778
Allied Union	FNV-Bond	1998	2014	Dissolved into FNV	N/A
Arts, Information and Media Union	KIEM	1998	2016	Dissolved into FNV	N/A
Arts Union	Kunstenbond	2016	2021	Separated from FNV	N/A
Construction and Wood Union	B&HB	1982	2014	Dissolved into FNV	168,219
Dutch Catholic Printing Union	NKGB	1902	1982	Merged into D&P	N/A
Dutch Independent Union of Public and Non-Profit Workers	NOVON	1991	1998	Merged into ABVA-KABO	N/A
Federation of Maritime Workers	FWZ	1967	2009	Merged into Nautilus	6,368
Food Workers' Union	VB	1980	1998	Merged into FNV-Bond	50,384
General Pharmacy Assistants' Union	AAAB	1890	1984	Merged into DIBO	2,927
General Union of Education Personnel	ABOP	1966	1996	Merged into AOB	41,833
General Dutch Printing Union	ANGB	1945	1982	Merged into D&P	N/A
Industrial Workers' Union	IB	1980	1998	Merged into FNV-Bond	273,316
Printing and Paper Union	D&P	1982	1998	Merged into KIEM	47,438
Self-Employed Union	Zelfstandigen	1999	2017	Dissolved into FNV	N/A
Services Union	DIBO	1981	1998	Merged into FNV-Bond	70,271
Transport Workers' Union	VB	1981	1998	Merged into FNV-Bond	68,790
Union of Military Conscripts	VVDM	1966	1996	Dissolved	N/A

== Presidents ==
1976: Wim Kok
1986: Hans Pont
1988: Johan Stekelenburg
1997: Lodewijk de Waal
2005: Agnes Jongerius
2012: Ton Heerts
2017: Han Busker
2021: Tuur Elzinga
2026: Hans Spekman
