= Dutch Catholic Trade Union Federation =

Dutch Christian trade union centre

The Dutch Catholic Trade Union Federation (Dutch: Nederlands Katholiek Vakverbond, NKV) was a national trade union centre bringing together Catholic trade unions in the Netherlands.

The federation was established in 1925, as the Roman Catholic Workers' Federation. It disbanded in 1941, but was reformed in 1945, as the Catholic Workers' Movement. In 1964, it became the NKV, with nine affiliated trade unions. In 1976, it merged with the Dutch Confederation of Trade Unions, to form the Federation of Dutch Trade Unions, although it was not formally dissolved until 1981.

== Presidents ==
1925: Ad de Bruijn
1952: Toon Middelhuis
1964: Jan Mertens

== Affiliates ==
Union	Abbreviation	Founded	Left	Reason not affiliated	Membership (1964)
Catholic Union of Administrative and Commercial Personnel in Industry	ACI	1963	1967	Merged into BHP	8,850
Catholic Union of Agriculture, Food and Tobacco	AVG	1968	1981	Merged into VB	N/A
Catholic Union of Commercial Employees	KBPH	1963	1980	Merged into DIBO	9,537
Catholic Union of Government Personnel	KABO	1949	1981	Merged into ABVA-KABO	36,803
Catholic Union of Personnel in Banks, Insurance Companies and Administrative Offices	St Christoffel	1963	1974	Transferred to MHP	7,019
Dutch Catholic Union of the Building and Wood Industries	KBBH	1972	1981	Merged into BHB	N/A
Dutch Catholic Clothing and Textile Workers' Union	St Lambertus	1948	1971	Merged into IB-NKV	21,175
Dutch Catholic Diamond Workers' Union					
Dutch Catholic Factory Workers' Union	St Willibrordus	1918	1971	Merged into IB-NKV	43,289
Dutch Catholic Metal Workers' Union	St Eloy	1902	1971	Merged into IB-NKV	57,667
Dutch Catholic Mineworkers' Union	St Barbara	1903	1971	Merged into IB-NKV	33,157
Dutch Catholic Non-Commissioned Officers' Association	St Martinus	1911	1981	Merged into ACOM	5,906
Dutch Catholic Pharmaceutical Assistants' Union		1918			1,063
Dutch Catholic Printing Union	NKGB	1902	1982	Transferred to FNV	15,374
Dutch Catholic Tobacco Workers' Union	St Willibrordus	1897	1968	Merged into AVG	4,052
Dutch Catholic Union of Agricultural Workers	St Deusdedit	1904	1968	Merged into AVG	21,974
Dutch Catholic Union of Barbers and Hairdressers	St Cosmos	1932	1980	Transferred to FNV	2,691
Dutch Catholic Union of Building Workers	St Joseph	1917	1971	Merged into KBBH	74,348
Dutch Catholic Union of Commercial Travellers, Agents, and Insurance Inspectors		1916			3,054
Dutch Catholic Union of Foremen and Supervisors	KLP	1913	1971	Merged into BHLP	10,002
Dutch Catholic Union of Hotel, Restaurant and Restaurant Employees	St Antonius	1911	1968	Merged into AVG	2,114
Dutch Catholic Union of Musicians and Artists		1947			91
Dutch Catholic Union of Shop Assistants, Administrative and Insurance Personnel	St Franciscus	1909	1963	Split	N/A
Dutch Catholic Union of Transport Personnel	KBV	1903	1981	Merged into VB	28,853
Dutch Catholic Union of Transport Workers	St Bonifacius	1918	1963	Merged into KBV	N/A
Dutch Catholic Union of Workers in the Food and Drink Industry	St Joris	1949	1968	Merged into AVG	8,123
Dutch Roman Catholic Union of Technicians and Chemical Workers	St Bernulphus	1918	1967	Merged into BHP	4,190
Dutch Roman Catholic Union of Woodworkers, Furniture Makers, Wallpaperers, and Related Trades	St Antonius van Padua	1920	1971	Merged into KBBH	7,796
Federation of Catholic Dutch Civil Servants and Private Sector Workers in Indonesia					315
General Roman Catholic Civil Servants' Association	ARKA	1918	1981	Transferred to CNV	
Industrial Workers' Union NKV	IB-NKV	1972	1981	Merged into IB	N/A
Union of Clerical and Supervisory Staff	BHP	1967	1971	Merged into BHLP	N/A
Union of Officials, Management and Senior Personnel	BHLP	1972	1974	Transferred to MHP	N/A
