= Dutch Confederation of Trade Unions =

Dutch former trade union confederation

NVV
- Dutch Confederation of Trade Unions
- Nederlands Verbond van Vakverenigingen
- Merged into: FNV
- Founded: 1906
- Dissolved: 1982
- Location: Netherlands

The Dutch Confederation of Trade Unions (Dutch: Nederlands Verbond van Vakverenigingen, NVV) was a Dutch social-democratic trade union.

== History ==
The NVV was founded in 1906 as a merger of fifteen smaller unions, as a result of the inability of the previous unions to control the radical elements of the workers movement in the railworkers' strike of 1903. The NVV was led by Henri Polak, who was a prominent member of the socialist Social Democratic Workers' Party.

During World War II the NVV was taken over by the German occupiers, its Dutch leader was Hendrik Jan Woudenberg. Under the German occupation the NVV was transformed into a Nazi union. After the war these influences were purged and the NVV cooperated tightly with the centre left government to create a welfare state based on the principles of corporatism.

In the 1970s, NVV membership began to decline due to depillarisation. Under the leadership of Wim Kok, the NVV attempted to form a federation with the Protestant Christian National Trade Union Federation (CNV) and the Catholic Dutch Catholic Trade Union Federation (NKV) which could strengthen all three. The CNV, however, left the talks in 1973. In 1976 the NVV and the NKV merged to form the Federation of Dutch Trade Unions (FNV).

== Ideology ==
The NVV started out as a socialist union, in favour of class struggle, workers' ownership of the means of production, and the use of strikes. After the second world war it began to moderate its tone, becoming, social-democratic and cooperating in the creation of a welfare state and a corporatist economy.

== Organization ==
The NVV had close formal, ideological and personal links with the socialist Social Democratic Workers' Party and later with the social-democratic PvdA. Together with the socialist VARA and several other organizations they formed the socialist pillar.

== Presidents ==
1906: Henri Polak
1909: Jan Oudegeest
1919: Roel Stenhuis
1929: Evert Kupers
1940: Henk Woudenberg
1942: Vacant
1945: Evert Kupers
1949: Henk Oosterhuis
1956: Kees van Wingerden
1959: Derk Roemers
1965: André Kloos
1971: Harry ter Heide
1972: Wim Kok

== Affiliates ==
Union	Abbreviation	Founded	Left	Reason not a member	Membership (1921)	Membership (1964)
Association of Captains and Officers of the Merchant Navy	VKO		1970	Merged into FMV	N/A	
Central Dutch Union of Civil Servants	CNAB	1919	1946	Merged into ABVA	10,122	N/A
Central Organisation of Merchant Navy Officers	CKO	1922	1955	Merged into CKV	N/A	N/A
Central Organisation of Sailors and Fishermen	CKV	1956	1967	Merged into FWZ	N/A	10,818
Central Union of Transport Workers	CBT	1917	1955	Merged into NBV	20,550	N/A
Dutch Barbers' and Hairdressers' Union		1891	1947	Merged into ANBH	266	N/A
Dutch Litho-, Photo- and Chemographers' Union	NLFCB	1912	1945	Merged into ANGB	1,536	N/A
Dutch Painters' Assistants' Union	NSGB	1905	1941	Merged into ANB	6,076	N/A
Dutch Musical Artists' Union	NTB	1919	1963	Disaffiliated	513	N/A
Dutch Police Union	NPB	1946	1981	Transferred to FNV	N/A	7,049
Dutch Union of Glass and Pottery Workers	NVvGA	1907	1926	Merged into ABC	2,670	N/A
Dutch Union of Hotel, Restaurant and Cafe Workers	NBHCR	1919	1981	Transferred to FNV	3,240	6,208
Dutch Union of Insurance Agents and Collectors	ANBVZI	1919	1947	Merged into Mercurius	N/A	N/A
Dutch Union of Personnel in Government Service	NBPO	1920	1946	Merged into ABVA	15,233	N/A
Dutch Association of Railway and Tramway Employees	NV	1886	1955	Merged into NBV	20,784	N/A
Dutch Union of Workers in Meat and Related Industries			1948	Merged into ABVG	1,219	N/A
Federation of Maritime Workers	FWZ	1967	1981	Transferred to FNV	N/A	N/A
General Diamond Workers' Union of the Netherlands	ANDB	1894	1958	Merged into ANMB	9,543	N/A
General Dutch Construction Union	ANB	1920	1970	Merged into ANBH	18,885	76,400
General Dutch Industrial Union of Agriculture	ANAB	1909	1970	Merged into AVB	13,521	32,114
General Dutch Industrial Union of the Mining Industry	ANBM	1909	1970	Merged into ABC	2,870	2,002
General Dutch Industrial Union of the Tobacco Industry	ANBTI	1887	1969	Merged into ABC	7,552	2,422
General Dutch Metalworkers' Union	ANMB	1886	1972	Merged into IB-NVV	21,048	107,478
General Dutch Pavers' Union		1915		Merged into ANB	670	N/A
General Dutch Plasterers' Union	ANSB	1903	1941	Merged into ANB	1,300	N/A
General Dutch Printing Union	ANGB	1945	1981	Transferred to FNV	N/A	29,097
General Dutch Typographers' Union	ANTB	1866	1945	Merged into ANGB	10,538	N/A
General Dutch Union of Domestic Workers	ANBH	1930	1954	Merged into ABC	514	N/A
General Dutch Union of the Building and Wood Industries	ANBH	1970	1981	Merged into BHB	N/A	N/A
General Dutch Union of Trade and Office Workers	ANBHK	1905	1940	Merged into Mercurius	4,932	N/A
General Union of the Food and Stimulant Industries	ABVG	1948	1970	Merged into AVB	N/A	12,956
General Dutch Union of Workers in the Baking, Chocolate and Sugar Working Industries		1908	1948	Merged into ABVG	5,122	N/A
General Industrial Union of Furniture Makers and Woodworkers	ABMH	1871	1970	Merged into ANBH	5,760	9,347
General Industrial Union of Textiles and Clothing	ABTK	1895	1972	Merged into IB-NVV	6,009	18,444
General Union of Artists		1964	1981	Transferred to FNV	N/A	386
General Union of Civil Servants	ABVA	1946	1980	Merged into ABVA-KABO	N/A	87,190
General Union of Education Personnel	ABOP	1966	1981	Transferred to FNV	N/A	N/A
General Union of Miscellaneous Industries	ABC	1907	1972	Merged into IB-NVV	17,449	46,161
General Union of Pharmaceutical Assistants	AAAB	1890	1980	Transferred to FNV	N/A	1,006
Industrial Union of Agriculture and Food	AVB	1970	1981	Merged into VOEB	N/A	N/A
Industrial Workers' Union NVV	IB-NVV	1972	1981	Merged into IB	N/A	N/A
Navvies' Union				Merged into ANB	2,221	N/A
Mercurius	Mercurius	1940	1981	Merged into DIBO	N/A	31,030
Dutch Transport Workers' Union	NBV	1956	1982	Merged into VB	N/A	45,534
Union of the Clothing Industry		1901	1942	Merged into ABTK	5,803	N/A
Union of Dental Technicians					N/A	N/A
Union of Dutch Captains and Mates in the Merchant Navy	VNGSK	1901	1922	Merged into CKO		N/A
Union of Dutch Teachers	BNO	1874	1946	Merged into NOV	N/A	N/A
Union of Foremen and Technical and Supervisory Personnel					665	N/A
Union of Marine Engineers	VVS	1913	1922	Merged into CKO	N/A	
Union of the Merchant Navy					N/A	
