= List of members of the House of Representatives of the Netherlands for the Social Democratic Workers' Party =

The Social Democratic Workers' Party (SDAP) was represented in the Dutch House of Representatives from 1897 until its merger into the Labour Party (PvdA) in 1946. This is a list of all members of the House of Representatives for the SDAP. Some terms nominally extended past May 1940, reflecting formal membership during the German occupation of the Netherlands, when the States General did not convene.

== List ==
List of members of the House of Representatives of the Netherlands for the Social Democratic Workers' Party
Member	Term start	Term end	Ref.
Willem Albarda	16 September 1913	9 August 1939	
George van den Bergh	15 September 1925	8 May 1933	
Harm de Boer	11 February 1930	8 May 1933	
Jan Bommer	4 September 1939	21 November 1945	
Henk van den Born	25 September 1945	8 February 1946	
Hendrik Jan van Braambeek	14 October 1921	8 February 1946	
Johan Brautigam	18 November 1919	16 September 1931	
Johan Brautigam	9 May 1933	20 September 1935	
Hendrik Brugmans	29 April 1939	15 November 1945	
Jaap Burger	20 November 1945	8 February 1946	
Charles Cramer	15 September 1925	7 June 1937	
Leen Donker	2 October 1935	8 February 1946	
Willem Drees	9 May 1933	23 June 1945	
Willem Drop	15 September 1925	9 March 1939	
Jan Duijs	21 September 1909	15 November 1935	
Jan Lambertus Faber	3 November 1931	11 March 1941	
Jacob van Gelderen	8 June 1937	13 May 1940	
Adriaan Gerhard	16 September 1913	13 May 1940	
Marinus van der Goes van Naters	8 June 1937	8 February 1946	
Suze Groeneweg	17 September 1918	7 June 1937	
Albert van der Heide	15 September 1925	7 June 1937	
Arie Heijkoop	17 September 1918	11 November 1919	
Willem Helsdingen	17 September 1901	18 September 1905	
Willem Helsdingen	21 October 1907	19 August 1921	
Louis Maximiliaan Hermans	17 September 1918	19 September 1921	
Piet Hiemstra	12 October 1921	7 June 1937	
Jan Hilgenga	8 June 1937	5 November 1941	
Henk Hofstra	20 November 1945	8 February 1946	
Bertus van der Houven	10 December 1929	8 May 1933	
Frederik Willem Nicolaas Hugenholtz	17 September 1901	13 May 1924	
Arie IJzerman	25 July 1921	8 February 1946	
Alida de Jong	29 September 1931	8 May 1933	
Alida de Jong	8 June 1937	8 July 1943	
Willem Caspar de Jonge	17 September 1918	24 July 1922	
Arie Kievit	8 June 1937	8 February 1946	
Asser Benjamin Kleerekoper	16 September 1913	17 September 1931	
Henri van Kol	24 September 1897	20 September 1909	
Herman van Kuilenburg	20 November 1945	8 February 1946	
Evert Kupers	17 September 1929	8 February 1946	
Jan ter Laan	16 September 1913	19 November 1929	
Jan ter Laan	13 October 1931	14 September 1941	
Kornelis ter Laan	17 September 1901	7 June 1937	
Jan van Leeuwen	16 September 1913	16 September 1918	
Kees van Lienden	8 June 1937	8 February 1946	
Gerrit Willem Melchers	17 September 1901	18 September 1905	
Maup Mendels	16 September 1913	16 September 1918	
Gerard Nederhorst	20 January 1946	8 February 1946	
Frans Ossendorp	17 September 1918	24 July 1922	
Jan Oudegeest	17 September 1918	24 July 1922	
Nico Palar	20 November 1945	8 February 1946	
Henk Ploeg Jr	25 September 1945	8 February 1946	
Henri Polak	16 September 1913	3 November 1913	
Jaap le Poole	20 November 1945	8 February 1946	
Eltjo Rugge	17 September 1918	24 July 1922	
Goswijn Sannes	16 September 1913	31 December 1929	
Jan Schaper	25 April 1899	30 August 1934	
Harm van Sleen	8 June 1937	8 February 1946	
Wiebe van der Sluis	15 September 1925	8 February 1946	
Hendrik Spiekman	16 September 1913	17 November 1917	
Bernardus Johannes van Stapele	20 November 1919	24 July 1922	
Roelof Stenhuis	15 September 1925	16 September 1929	
Jo Stokvis	8 June 1937	8 February 1946	
Ko Suurhoff	21 September 1939	8 February 1946	
Pieter Lodewijk Tak	19 September 1905	23 August 1907	
Jan van den Tempel	10 November 1915	10 August 1939	
Theo Thijssen	9 May 1933	22 December 1943	
Pieter Jelles Troelstra	24 September 1897	16 September 1901	
Pieter Jelles Troelstra	13 December 1902	14 September 1925	
Evert Vermeer	10 January 1946	8 February 1946	
Jan Vlam	22 November 1945	8 February 1946	
Willem Vliegen	21 September 1909	30 September 1915	
Willem Vliegen	22 July 1922	8 June 1937	
Hein Vos	8 June 1937	23 June 1945	
Agnes de Vries-Bruins	25 July 1922	8 May 1933	
Agnes de Vries-Bruins	20 September 1934	8 February 1946	
Theo van der Waerden	17 September 1918	11 June 1940	
Bernard Wijkamp	18 September 1924	14 September 1925	
Bernard Wijkamp	25 September 1945	8 February 1946	
Jan van Zadelhoff	17 September 1918	8 June 1937	
Arie de Zeeuw	15 January 1918	11 November 1919	

== See also ==
- Social Democratic Workers' Party (Netherlands)
- List of Labour Party (Netherlands) MPs
