= Hendrik Jan Woudenberg =

Dutch fascist union leader and politician (1891–1967)

- Hendrik Jan Woudenberg in 1938

Member of the House of Representatives
- In office 8 June 1937 – 14 September 1945

Personal details
- Born: 19 September 1891 Amsterdam, Netherlands
- Died: 4 July 1967 (aged 75) Amsterdam, Netherlands
- Party: NSB (1933–1945)
- Other political affiliations: SDAP; SP
- Spouse: Trijntje van Blaaderen (m. 1917)
- Children: 3

Hendrik Jan Woudenberg (19 September 1891 – 4 July 1967) was a Dutch fascist politician and union leader. He was a member of the Dutch House of Representatives from 1937 until 1945 for the National Socialist Movement (NSB). During the German occupation of the Netherlands, Woudenberg was made head of the Dutch Confederation of Trade Unions in 1940, which was replaced by the Dutch Labour Front (DAF) in 1942. Following World War II, Woudenberg was sentenced to life in prison, which was later commuted to 20 years, being released in 1956.

== Early life ==
Hendrik Jan Woudenberg was born on 19 September 1891 as the sixth child of Helmert Woudenberg, a farmer from Woudenberg who settled in Amsterdam where he ran a small cow farm in the Joden Houttuin, and Sophia Gijsbertsen. Hendrik Jan was a sickly child, who was almost completely blind until the age of three, and would suffer from deafness in his left ear, problems with moving his left arm and various other medical issues his whole life. He left school at twelve to become an errand boy, while taking night courses in French, German, and accounting. In 1914, Woudenberg found work at Van Oterendorp & Co, a Jewish-owned fish export business in IJmuiden, becoming procurator in 1922 and a director and co-owner of the company in 1935.

== Political career ==
According to himself, Hendrik Jan Woudenberg had initially had socialist sympathies until about 1933, similar to his brother Kees Woudenberg, a prominent member of the Social Democratic Workers' Party (SDAP). He had at one point also been a member of the Socialist Party led by Harm Kolthek.

Following the ascension of Adolf Hitler to power and the mutiny on HNLMS De Zeven Provinciën in 1933, Hendrik Jan Woudenberg grew increasingly attracted to fascism, coming under the influence of several members of the National Socialist Movement (NSB) and their internal solidarity, joining the NSB in late 1933. Woudenberg was a supporter of NSB leader Anton Mussert, whom he had admired even before joining the NSB. Woudenberg became deputy circle leader of the NSB in IJmuiden that same year, and joined the Propaganda Council and Political Council of the NSB as well, serving in these bodies until 1937 and 1944 respectively.

Following the 1937 Dutch general election, Woudenberg was elected to the House of Representatives for the NSB. As one of the few NSB members with union experience, Woudenberg was the party's primary expert on trade union matters.

== Union leader ==
In 1935, Woudenberg was chosen as chairperson of the National Worker's Federation (Nationale Werknemersvereniging; NWV), a minor labour union of less than 5,000 members founded initially by the Alliance for National Reconstruction, but which grew increasingly close to the NSB. The NWV consisted mainly of waiters, taxi drivers, and fishermen, small entrepreneurs, vendors and salespeople, with negligible support among industrial workers. Woudenberg also edited Het Arbeidsfront, a NSB publication aimed at workers, from 1935 to 1937.

In May 1940, Woudenberg, along with other fascists, was interned by the Dutch government. During the German occupation of the Netherlands, Woudenberg was initially tasked by Mussert with setting up a Dutch equivalent of the German Labour Front. As head of the NWV, he presented the occupiers with a set of demands in June, including equal recognition of the NWV with other unions and the implementation of national unemployment insurance. After plans were made for the gleichschaltung of Dutch unions, Woudenberg was appointed by Reichskommissar Arthur Seyss-Inquart as head of the Dutch Confederation of Trade Unions (NVV) in July 1940 with the support of Mussert and Meinoud Rost van Tonningen, who was tasked with nazifying the SDAP and the socialist pillar. As commissioner of the NVV, Woudenberg immediately fired its chairman Evert Kupers and general secretary Simon de la Bella, and set about purging the NVV, though its membership remained relatively stable.

In 1941, Woudenberg joined the SS, and was awarded an SS pistol as a gift. On 25 July 1941, Woudenberg became commissioner of the Christian union federations as well with the intention of merging them into a single union federation, but was hindered by a mass exodus of members. The Christian unions were eventually liquidated and forcibly merged with the NVV. The NVV was also tasked with organising the Arbeidseinsatz in January 1942, coordinating the forced labour of Dutch men in German factories.

On 1 May 1942, the NVV was reformed into the Dutch Labour Front (Nederlands Arbeidsfront, NAF), based on the German Labour Front, and which had the ultimate goal of mandating membership for all employers and employees, and which would participate in the setting of wages. The NAF failed to gain much influence among Dutch workers however, due to its close and transparent ties to the NSB, as well as the concurrent drop in living standards and forced labour of Dutch workers in German factories. Woudenberg was also represented in meetings of Rost van Tonningen's Employers' Council.

In late 1943, Woudenberg attempted to resign due to illness, but at the urging of Mussert he continued at his post, spending the last period of the war sick in Amsterdam.

== Later life ==
After the capitulation of Germany, Woudenberg attempted to escape by disguising himself as a German soldier, which he managed to do successfully for a week. He was eventually discovered among German soldiers in their barracks in Amsterdam, and was subsequently arrested.

On 23 December 1948, Woudenberg was sentenced to life in prison, which was reduced to 20 years in 1950 before he was ultimately released from prison in 1956. While imprisoned, Woudenberg wrote his memoirs at the request of the NIOD Institute for War, Holocaust and Genocide Studies.

Hendrik Jan Woudenberg died on 4 July 1967 in Amsterdam.

== Personal life ==
Woudenberg married Trijntje van Blaaderen on 10 May 1917, with whom he had two sons and one daughter.
