= Plan De Man =

Contemporary poster showing the Plan, portrayed as a fist, attacking big business, represented as an octopus coiled around the Belgian economy.

The Labour Plan (French: Plan du Travail, Dutch: Plan van de Arbeid), commonly known as the Plan De Man after its creator, was an economic policy devised in 1933 by the Belgian politician Henri De Man of the Belgian Labour Party (POB-BWP), to combat the economic situation experienced by Belgium in the aftermath of the Great Depression. The plan, described as a "Labour Plan", was one of the foremost examples of De Man's doctrine of "Planisme" (state planning). The policy was aimed at "instilling a mixed economic system" by the creation of "a nationalized sector covering the organization of credit and the main industries which have already in reality been monopolized."

It was broadly similar to the Franklin D. Roosevelt's 1933 "New Deal" in the United States and the later SDAP's 1935 Plan of Labour in the Netherlands.

== Criticism ==
Despite the support of the POB-BWP, the plan was criticized by many left-wing commentators. Leon Trotsky derided the plan as "a plan to deceive the toilers" and "a renovated instrument of bourgeois-democratic conservatism." Trotsky further attacked the plan in a January 1934 article, entitled Revisionism and Planning, in the newspaper New International.
