= Nellie van Kol =

Dutch feminist, educator and children's author

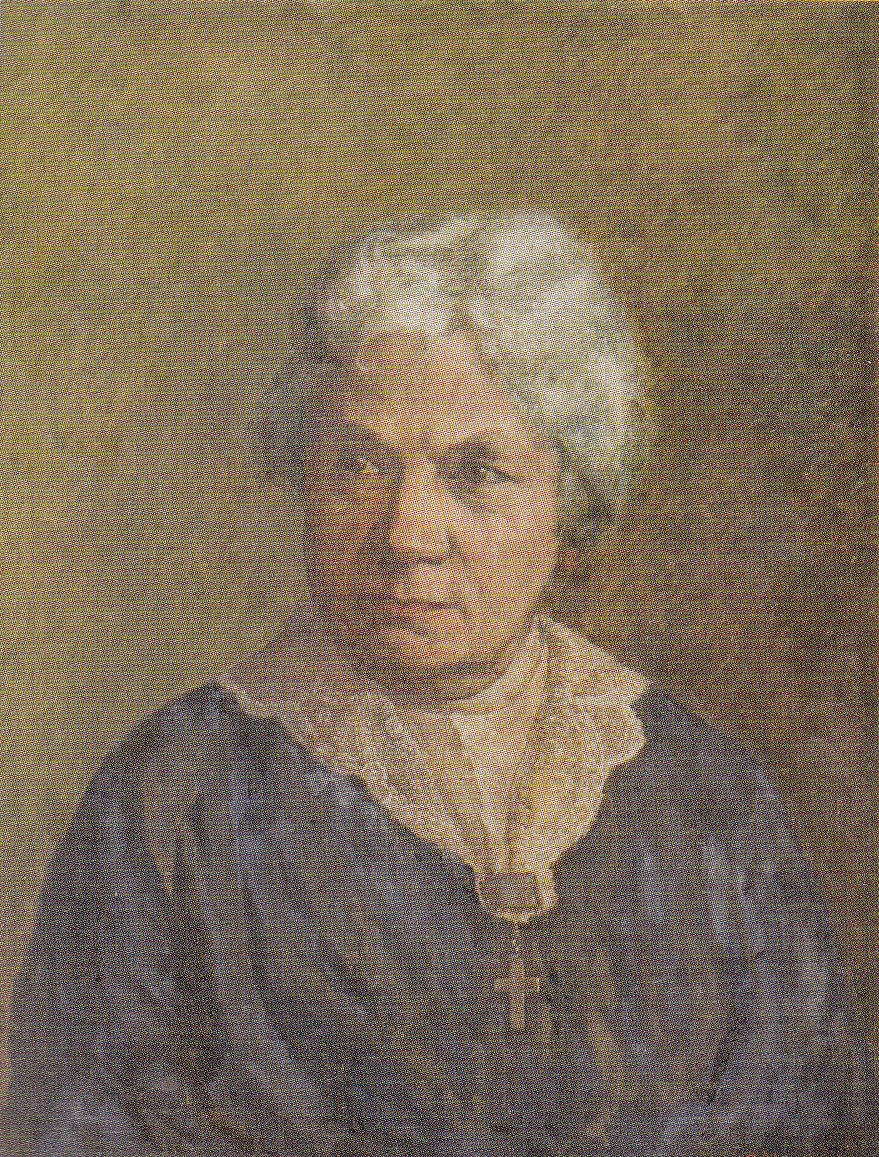
- Portrait of Nellie van Kol, by C.A.F. (1931)
- Born: Jacoba Maria Petronella Porreij; 12 December 1851 's-Hertogenbosch, Netherlands
- Died: 24 February 1930 (aged 78); Utrecht, Netherlands
- Occupations: Feminist; educator; children's author
- Spouse: Henri van Kol (m. 1883; div. 1919)
- Children: 4
- Relatives: Drs. P (grandson)

Nellie van Kol (née Porreij; pen name/nickname, Nellie; 12 December 1851 – 24 February 1930) was a Dutch feminist, educator, and children's author also active in Belgium. She contributed to the cause of women and had a great influence on the development of children's literature in the 20th century.

== Early life and education ==
Jacoba Maria Petronella Porreij was born in 's-Hertogenbosch, Netherlands, on 12 December 1851. Her parents, David Porrey (1818-1864), a state tax official, and Sophia Frederika Juliana Wilhelmina Neirinckx (1828-1909) were devout members of the Dutch Reformed Church. Van Kol was the eldest of six children. Her father died when she was fourteen. Despite financial difficulties, she attended a boarding school (1866-1869) where she studied to become a teacher, not by vocation, but to meet her needs and those of her family (her mother, grandmother, brother, and her half-sister).

== Career ==
She worked for several years as a teacher (1871-1876), notably in Baarn and then at the Hernhütters boarding school for girls in Barby, Germany.

In 1875, she met Professor G. J. Mulder, a Protestant conservative. He was a mentor for her and encouraged her to continue her studies and to write. He also boosted her confidence. Van Kol continued to correspond with Mulder until his death in 1880.

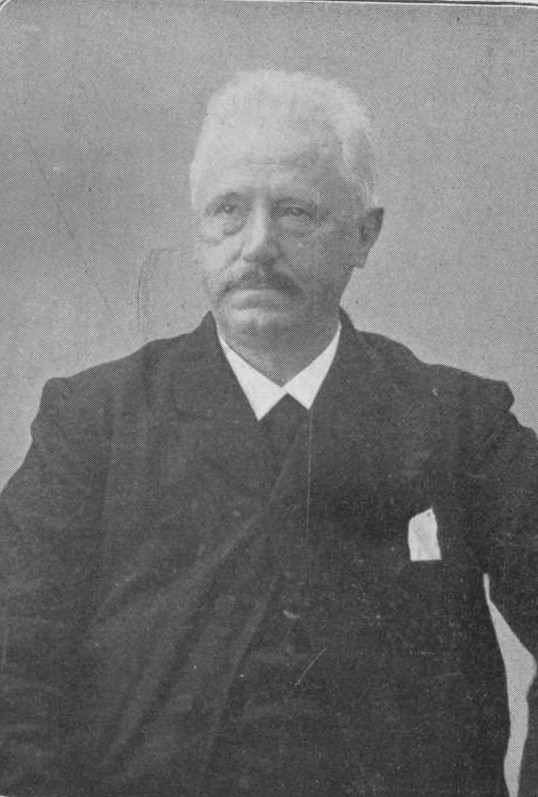
Henri van Kol (1913)

In 1877, van Kol left for the Dutch East Indies to work as a governess. She did not like her life in the Dutch East Indies, as she regularly noted in her diary: "With my thirst for higher knowledge, I have to teach the alphabet to children. I would like to cry out in despair and bitterness!" In addition to her diary, she wrote regularly. In 1882, she won a competition from Soerabaijasch Handelsblad with a travelogue. In the years 1882–1883, this newspaper published her "Letters to Minette" (Brieven aan Minette van Nellie), in which she gave her opinion on subjects such as colonial society, the situation of women, and the education of children. She wrote under the name "Nellie" and that's how she began to be called in everyday life. Her articles quickly gained popularity, boosting the newspaper's sales figures. One of her admirers was water management engineer, Henri van Kol.

Henri van Kol was one of the first Dutch socialists. In 1871, he joined the First International as a student. Nellie and Henri van Kol married on 27 July 1883. They had four children, Lili (born 1886) and Ferdi (born 1891), and two children who died very young. Lili was the mother of writer Heinz Polzer, known as Drs. P. Nellie continued to write and published, among other things, in 1883 a collection of stories for children, Bloemensprookjes.

=== Socialism ===
In the years 1884–1886, the couple settled for some time in Aywaille, Belgium. From there, Nellie made many trips. With her husband, she participated in the activities of the socialist movement. She made the acquaintance of many important socialists, including Ferdinand Domela Nieuwenhuis as well as socialist women from Russia. From then on, she declared herself agnostic and socialist. She assisted her husband with translations and took care of his correspondence. She herself became president of the Union pour la Solidarité des Femmes à Bruxelles (Union for Women's Solidarity in Brussels).

She is one of the first women to publish articles in socialist journals, such as Vooruit, in particular, articles on socialism and education. In 1892, Nellie van Kol and her husband returned to Europe permanently, settling again in Belgium.

Van Kol published articles in the Dutch magazine Evolutie and took a stand on issues such as sex education, the monarchy, feminism, and socialism. She attended the International Socialist Congresses of 1893 in Zürich and 1896 in London. In the early 1890s, she still believed that women's participation in the socialist movement would bring them emancipation. From around 1896, van Kol distanced herself more because she believed the movement was expecting too much from material changes. She then became more involved in the women's movement and children's literature. She even declared that she had never been a member of any party.

=== Feminism ===
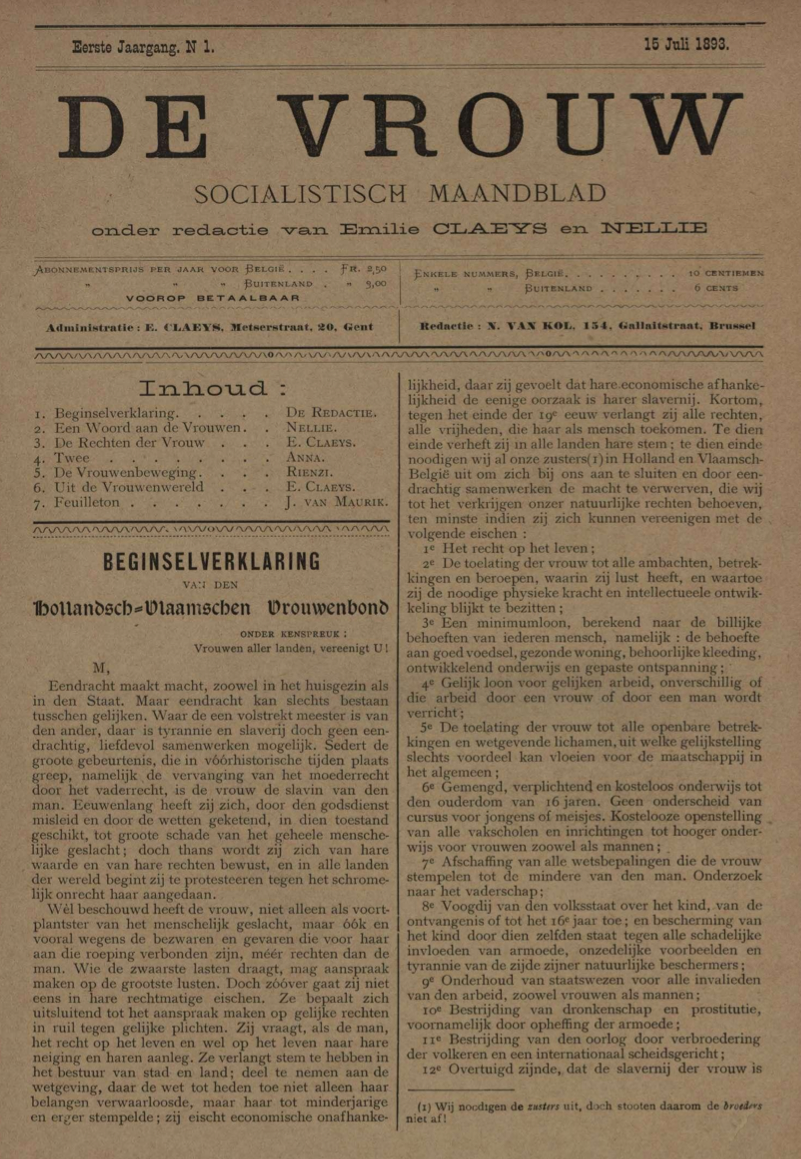
Cover of the first edition of De Vrouw from 15 July 1893

In 1893, with the Ghent socialist Emilie Claeys, van Kol found the Hollandsch-Vlaamsche Vrouwenbond (Union of Dutch and Flemish women). Together, they published a monthly magazine, De Vrouw, until 1900. Van Kol published very avant-garde articles in favor of the emancipation of women which were not always very well received. In numerous speeches in the Netherlands and Belgium, she pleaded for birth control (which caused De Vrouw to be blacklisted by the Catholic Church), for equal career opportunities for women and men, and for equal pay for equal work.

An article on sex education caused the paper to lose almost all of its Belgian subscribers. As a result, the paper took on a predominantly Dutch connotation, which displeased the editors of Evolutie, especially Wilhelmina Drucker, who feared this competition.

In 1893, she was one of the founders of the Vereeniging voor Vrouwenkiesrecht (Association for Women's Suffrage). In 1897, she was a co-founder of the Vereeniging Onderlinge Vrouwenbescherming (Association for the Mutual Protection of Women), which supported single mothers, and from 1898, she was a member of the Vereeniging voor Verbetering van Vrouwenkleeding (Association for the Improvement of Women's Clothing). She remained active in the socialist movement, attending several congresses of the Socialist International with her husband and collecting signatures against the Aceh War in 1897. Henri van Kol left the Social Democratic League (SDB) and became one of the founders of the Social Democratic Workers' Party (SDAP). In 1900, Nellie van Kol resigned as editor-in-chief of De Vrouw to devote more time to children's literature. However, she continued to publish articles regularly.

=== Return to children's literature ===
Van Kol founded the magazine Ons Blaadje, with the aim of offering good literature at affordable prices to working-class children. The magazine displeased the Catholic and conservative circles, who reproached it with an "inflammatory socialist character". Until 1908, van Kol remained associated with the magazine as editor-in-chief. She then published Bibliotheek voor jongens en meisjes (Library for boys and girls) in nine volumes, which later became Volkskinderbibliotheek van Nellie (Nellie's Popular Library). She also translated and adapted many fairy tales and Bible stories, which were popular genres at the time. She also published numerous reviews of children's books, contributing to the growing interest in children's literature.

== Later life ==
In 1897, Henri van Kol was elected a member of parliament for the Democratic Workers' Party in the Netherlands. Two years later, the family moved to the Netherlands, first to Princenhage, later to Voorschoten. Henri van Kol is often absent, traveling a lot in the Netherlands and in the Dutch Indies. During this period the two spouses gradually separate. Nellie van Kol became interested in religious socialism, the Rein Leven Beweging, theosophy, and spiritualism. She also became a vegetarian. She retired from public life, resigning from most of her functions. In the article "Exeo" (I'm leaving; or I'm dying), she takes leave of the editorial staff of De Vrouw.

From 1901 onwards, van Kol turned to Christianity, joining The Salvation Army in 1908 and publishing regular articles in their magazine De Strijdkreet. She declared herself "converted and born again". This conversion was very badly perceived in the socialist milieu. Ferdinand Domela Nieuwenhuis called van Kol a "lost sheep", but continued to see her as an ideal woman working for the good of the people. In 1913, she was co-organizer of the exhibition De Vrouw 1813-1913 in Amsterdam, where she was responsible for the children's reading department. In 1919, the separation from her husband is final. From 1925, she lived successively in De Bilt, Amerongen, and Doorn.

== Death and legacy ==
Nellie van Kol died on 24 February 1930 in Utrecht at the age of 79. Soldiers of the Salvation Army carried her to her grave.

The Nellie van Kol Archive is kept at Atria Institute on gender equality and women's history in Amsterdam.

== Selected works ==
- De belegerde stad, 1908. (text)
- Bloemensprookjes, 1883
- Brieven aan Minette van Nellie, 1884.
- Der bloemen sprookjeswereld. Bloemensagen, -legenden, -sprookjes, 1908. (text)
- Chineesche schimmen. Vertellingen en legenden uit China, 1906. (text)
- Een geheim en andere verhalen, Nelly van Kol (ed.), Netty Heyligers (ill.)
- Het heele jaar rond. Feesten, gebruiken, vertellingen en legenden, in Nederland en elders, 6 vol. 1903. (vol. 1), (vol. 2), (vol. 3), (vol. 4), (vol. 5), (vol. 6).
- In 't schemeruur bij 't knappend vuur, 1904. (text)
- Kinderversjes, Netty Heyligers (ill.), 1923.
- Nellie's groote vertelselboek. Sprookjes en vertellingen van Mevrouw van Kol, 1931. (text)
- Onze oudjes in hun lief en leed, 1907. (text)
- Parels. Keur van vertellingen voor de rijpere jeugd, 1904. (text)
- Stralen van één licht. Keur van vertellingen, voor de rijpere jeugd, 1902. (text)
- Uit Egypteland, 1906. (text)
- Uit het groene Erin. Iersche verhalen en sagen, 1904. (text)
- Uit het land van Bretagne. Middeleeuwsche legenden, 1904. (text)
- Van blond en bruin. Kinder-levensbeeldjes, 1905. (text)
- Van strijd en moeite. Schetsen voor de rijpere jeugd, 1920. (text)
- Van 't zelfde ras. Vijf verhalen voor de rijpere jeugd, 1903. (text)
