= Gerard Nederhorst =

Dutch politician (1907-1979)

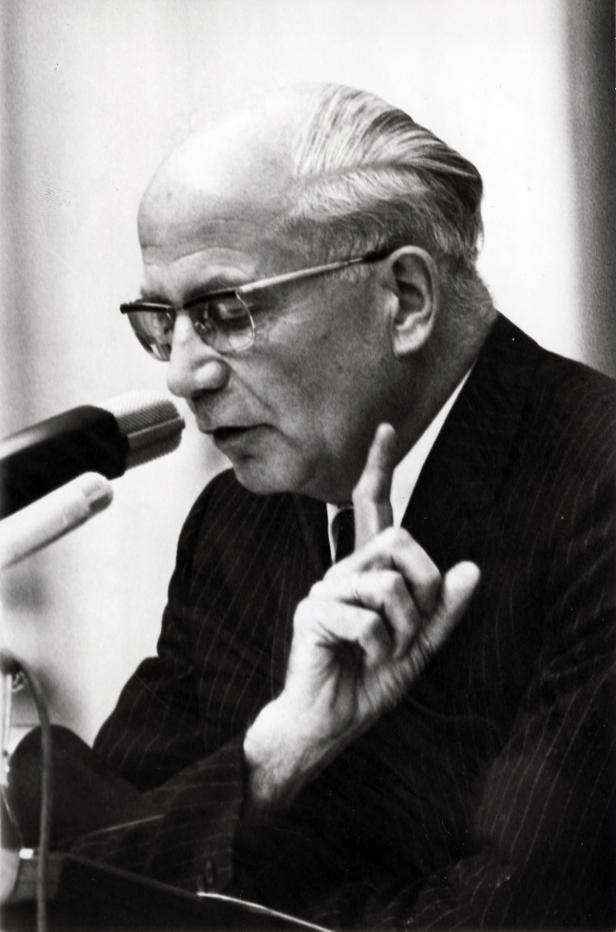
- Gerard Nederhorst in 1969

Member of the House of Representatives
- In office 10 January 1946 – 4 June 1946
- In office 16 August 1946 – 27 July 1948
- In office 21 December 1948 – 10 May 1971

Member of the Senate
- In office 11 May 1971 – 20 September 1977

Member of the European Parliament
- In office 10 September 1952 – 29 September 1965
- Constituency: Netherlands

Personal details
- Born: Gerard Marinus Nederhorst; 17 October 1907 Gouda, Netherlands
- Died: 28 August 1979 (aged 71) Haastrecht, Netherlands
- Party: SDAP (1931-1946); PvdA (1946-1979)
- Spouse: Carolina Pothuis (m. 1936)
- Children: 3
- Education: University of Amsterdam

Gerard Marinus Nederhorst (17 October 1907 – 28 August 1979) was a Dutch economist and politician. He was a member of the House of Representatives from 1946 to 1971 for the Labour Party (PvdA), the European Parliament from 1952 to 1965, and the Senate from 1971 to 1977, serving as the PvdA's parliamentary leader from 1965 to 1967.

== Early life ==
Gerard Nederhorst was born on 17 October 1907 in Gouda into a wealthy family. His grandfather had been a liberal member of the South Holland provincial council and an alderman in Gouda. After finishing his secondary education in Arnhem and The Hague he studied business administration at the University of Amsterdam, graduating in 1926. He became attracted to socialism after hearing SDAP leader Johan Willem Albarda speak in 1930 and through contacts with Henriëtte Roland Holst, and in 1931, Nederhorst joined the Social Democratic Workers' Party (SDAP).

During the Great Depression, Nederhorst became opposed to what he saw as the too conservative economic stance of the SDAP, and became influenced by the ideas of H. N. Brailsford and Hendrik de Man who argued for economic interventionism. He participated in the writing of the Plan of Labour, which was adopted as the SDAP's official economic proposal to fight the Great Depression in 1935.

== Political career ==
In 1946, Nederhorst became a member of the House of Representatives for the newly formed Labour Party (PvdA). He was a part of the minority within the PvdA who opposed the Police Actions in Indonesia, against the policy of prime minister Willem Drees. However, he was also a staunch supporter of Dutch membership in NATO.

He was an early supporter of European unification, and was chosen to serve in the Common Assembly of the European Coal and Steel Community in 1952, later renamed to the European Parliament, which he was a member of until 1965.

In 1965 Nederhorst caused controversy by writing a letter regarding the marriage of princess Beatrix to former Wehrmacht soldier Claus von Amsberg. Despite his personal opposition to the marriage and harsh criticism of Beatrix who he saw as unfit for office, he nevertheless urged skeptical party members to vote in favour of it. He also criticised foreign minister Joseph Luns and former Prime Minister Jan de Quay, the latter over his fascist sympathies during World War II, seeing Beatrix as a more preferable head of state compared to them. After the letter was published by Het Parool on 25 October 1965, Nederhorst had to retract several statements in a parliamentary debate two weeks later.

In 1967, he was succeeded as the PvdA's parliamentary leader by Joop den Uyl. He was vice-chairman of the House of Representatives until 1971, when he became a member of the Senate, in which he served until 1977.
