= Evert Kupers =

Dutch union leader and politician (1885–1965)

- Evert Kupers in 1933

Member of the House of Representatives
- In office 17 September 1929 – 27 July 1948

Member of the Provincial Council of North Holland
- In office 12 April 1927 – 28 April 1931

Personal details
- Born: 5 January 1885 Groningen, Netherlands
- Died: 23 January 1965 (aged 80) Bloemendaal, Netherlands
- Party: SDAP (1903–1946); PvdA (1946–1965)
- Spouse: Constantina Maria Geeske Thönissen (m. 1909)
- Children: 4
- Occupation: trade unionist, chair of the Dutch Federation of Trade Unions (NVV), 1928–1949

Evert Kupers (5 January 1885 – 23 January 1965) was a Dutch union leader and politician. One of the most prominent figures in the Dutch labour movement of the early 20th century, Kupers served in various leadership positions of the Dutch Confederation of Trade Unions (NVV) from 1915 and as its chairperson from 1928 to 1949, with an interruption during the German occupation of the Netherlands. Kupers was also a member of the Provincial Council of North Holland from 1927 to 1931 and of the Dutch House of Representatives from 1929 to 1948 for the Social Democratic Workers' Party (SDAP) and later the Labour Party (PvdA).

== Early life ==
Evert Kupers was born on 5 January 1885 in Groningen to Jan Kupers, a tailor, and Anje Kema. From 1899, Kupers worked as an apprentice for his father. Although he had initially been part of a Christian youth organisation, Kupers became convinced of the merits of socialism after attending a socialist public meeting, subsequently joining the socialist youth organisation De Zaaier. At the age of 18, Kupers joined the Social Democratic Workers' Party.

That same year, Kupers joined the Dutch Association of Workers in the Clothing Industry, and after raising money for striking clothing workers he became assistant secretary of the union and representative from the northern provinces to the union's national executive. In 1905, Kupers attended the founding congress of the Dutch Confederation of Trade Unions (NVV).

== Union career ==
In 1907, after the Dutch Association of Workers in the Clothing Industry moved to Amsterdam, Kupers became the union's first salaried employee, working as its treasurer. In 1909, he became the Association's chairperson. Under Kupers's leadership, the Association grew significantly in influence in the clothing industry. He also helped lead strikes in support of higher wages, most notably during the strike wave of 1913. Kupers stepped down as chairman of the Association in 1915.

In 1915, Kupers helped establish an unemployment fund for his union, which led to him being asked by Jan Oudegeest and Jan van den Tempel to become second secretary of the national NVV that year. In 1919, Kupers was promoted to first secretary of the NVV, becoming vice-chair in 1925 and finally head chairperson in 1928, succeeding Roel Stenhuis. As the NVV's leader, Kupers became known as a pragmatic and responsible figure, who sought to keep the labour movement on what he saw as a realistic path.

During the 1910s to 1930s, Kupers wrote widely on social affairs, including a 1918 report advocating for a state health service. In 1920, Kupers authored a plan with employer representative F. E. Posthuma for having health insurance implemented through cooperation between unions and employers' organisations, which formed the basis for the health insurance funds implemented from 1930 onward. He continued advocating for more centralisation in the organisation of health insurance fund in the 1930s, though with little effect.

Two days after the Dutch capitulation to Germany on 15 May 1940 during World War II, the NVV under Kupers initially intended on staying neutral with the hope of being able to continue its social tasks. On 16 July 1940, Kupers was unexpectedly informed that he, along with vice-chair Simon de la Bella, would be immediately fired, to be replaced by National Socialist Movement politician and fascist trade unionist Hendrik Jan Woudenberg, successfully managing to escape arrest after being tipped off about the German occupation's intention to arrest him. Kupers was arrested in 1941 during the February Strike but was released from jail after the Germans determined Kupers had had no role in the strike, and was able to escape arrest a second time in May 1942. After being removed from the NVV, Kupers took on various functions throughout the Netherlands, which enabled him to keep in touch with union leadership throughout the country.

During the war, Kupers would begin to cooperate with unions from other social pillars, such as with Adrianus Cornelis de Bruijn of the Roman Catholic Workers' League (RKWV) in 1942 in a failed attempt to set up a counterweight to the fascist Dutch Labour Front, and drafting an agreement in 1943 between the NVV, RKWV and Christian National Trade Union Federation (CNV) to set up a cooperation council after the war. Kupers was arrested again in March 1945 and imprisoned in Apeldoorn, being freed after the Allied liberation of the town. After the refoundation of the NVV following the war, Kupers participated in merger talks with the communist-aligned Unity Trade Union Federation, but these ultimately failed in 1947.

== Political career ==
In 1924, Kupers had established a commission aimed at cooperation between the SDAP and NVV, proposing that members of the NVV be put on the SDAP's electoral list. Kupers was first elected to the Provincial Council of North Holland in 1927, serving until 1931. In the 1929 Dutch general election, Kupers was also elected to the House of Representatives for the SDAP. As an MP, Kupers focused on social affairs and labour matters, as well as agriculture and the Dutch East Indies. He primarily saw his parliamentary activities as an extension of his union work, as a way to express the wishes of the labour movement to the government, and was often absent due to his international activities.

In 1931, Kupers and two other NVV leaders traveled to the Dutch East Indies, where they visited Sukarno in prison and undertook efforts to have him released. During the Indonesian War of Independence, Kupers became a supporter of the Dutch efforts to keep Indonesia under its control. Kupers left the House of Representatives in 1948, having joined the Labour Party (PvdA) following the SDAP's merger in 1946.

== International activities ==
Kupers's international activities began in the 1910s, founding an international union secretariat in 1910 and representing the NVV internationally in 1919 and 1920. From 1922, he attended the yearly meetings of the International Labour Organization (ILO), and actively worked on matters including internal ILO affairs and Indonesia, serving on its executive in the 1930s. He also served on the General Council of the International Federation of Trade Unions from 1926 to 1936, and as a vice-chair from 1936 onward.

After World War II, Kupers became active in the World Federation of Trade Unions (WFTU), attending its founding congress in 1945. Kupers came into conflict with the communist unions in the WFTU over his stances on union independence, his support for American foreign policy, including the Marshall Plan, as well as his support of the Dutch Police Actions, being the sole representative to vote against a 1947 motion condemning the Netherlands. In 1949, Kupers, along with British and American union representatives, left the WFTU, and would later go on to found the International Confederation of Free Trade Unions that same year.

== Later life ==
In 1949, Kupers officially retired as chairperson, and was given a grand farewell by the NVV. He would remain active in various organisations throughout the rest of his life, including as an advisor for the Trade Union Advisory Committee to the OECD until 1951 and a group organising support for Hungarian refugees fleeing the Soviet invasion of Hungary in 1956.

Evert Kupers died on 23 January 1965 in Bloemendaal.

== Personal life ==
Kupers married Constantina Maria Geeske Thönissen, a seamstress who was also active in the labour movement, on 19 May 1909. The couple had four sons together.

Trade union offices
Preceded by Roel Stenhuis vacant	President of the Dutch Confederation of Trade Unions; 1928–1940; 1945–1949	Succeeded by Hendrik Jan Woudenberg; Henk Oosterhuis
