= Enschede (electoral district) =

The district of Enschede in 1888

Enschede was an electoral district of the House of Representatives in the Netherlands from 1848 to 1850, and again from 1888 to 1918.

== Profile ==
The electoral district of Enschede was first created as a provisional single-seat district in 1848, and comprised the southern and eastern parts of the Twente region in the province of Overijssel. It had a population of 22,576, of which a majority of 54.7% was Catholic, while 42.7% was Dutch Reformed. The district abolished only two years later, when most of its territory was absorbed by the district of Almelo, which became a two-seat district.

Enschede was recreated as a single-seat district in 1888. It was smaller than it had been in its first iteration; aside from the city of Enschede, it included the municipalities of Haaksbergen, Hengelo, Lonneker, Losser and Oldenzaal. Much of the district's population worked in the textile industry. Throughout its second iteration, the district of Enschede's population increased substantially, from almost 47,000 in 1888 to just over 94,000 in 1909. The Catholic share of the population decreased in the same period from 45.6% to 38.1%, while its Dutch Reformed share of the population remained steady at around 47-48%. The small gereformeerde minority increased from 2.1% to 5.0%, while the category "Others" increased from 4.4% to 10.1%.

The district of Enschede was abolished upon the introduction of party-list proportional representation in 1918.

== Members ==
=== First creation ===
Enschede's inaugural election was won by the moderate liberal Carel Marius Storm van 's-Gravesande, but he did not take his seat. The subsequent by-election was won by Maximiliaan Jacob de Man, also a moderate liberal.

Election	Member	Ref.
1848	Carel Marius Storm van 's-Gravesande	
1848	Maximiliaan Jacob de Man	

=== Second creation ===
Geertsema, 1897

Van Kol, 1905

During its second iteration, Enschede was usually held by the parliamentary left, initially by the Liberal candidate Willem Jacob Geertsema. In 1897, after a single term in which the district was represented by the Catholic Antonius Franciscus Vos de Wael, the seat was taken back by the Liberals, but the elected member, Nicolaas Pierson, did not take his seat due to his appointment as finance minister in the new Pierson ministry. In the subsequent by-election, the seat was won by the Social Democratic candidate Henri van Kol, who became one of just three Social Democrats in the House of Representatives. With the exception of a single term, the district remained in Social Democratic hands until its abolition in 1918, notably with Willem Albarda, the later party leader and minister.

Election	Member	Party	Ref.
1888	Willem Jacob Geertsema	Lib	
1891	Willem Jacob Geertsema	Lib	
1894	Antonius Franciscus Vos de Wael	Ka	
1897	Nicolaas Pierson	Lib	
1897	Henri van Kol	SDAP	
1901	Henri van Kol	SDAP	
1905	Henri van Kol	SDAP	
1909	Gerrit Elhorst	AR	
1913	Willem Albarda	SDAP	
1917	Willem Albarda	SDAP	

== Election results ==
=== Elections in the 1840s ===
1848 general election: Enschede
Candidate	Party	Votes	%
Carel Marius Storm van 's-Gravesande	Independent	261	53.81
Herman van Sonsbeeck	Independent	215	44.33
Others		9	1.86
Total		485	100.00
Valid votes		485	99.79
Invalid/blank votes		1	0.21
Total votes		486	100.00
Registered voters/turnout		532	91.35
Independent gain			
Source: Electoral Council, Huygens Institute

1848 Enschede by-election
Candidate	Party	Votes	%
Maximiliaan Jacob de Man	Independent	257	52.66
Herman van Sonsbeeck	Independent	186	38.11
B.W. Blijdenstein	Independent	36	7.38
Others		9	1.84
Total		488	100.00
Valid votes		488	100.00
Invalid/blank votes		0	0.00
Total votes		488	100.00
Registered voters/turnout		532	91.73
Independent hold			
Source: Electoral Council, Huygens Institute

=== Elections in the 1880s ===
1888 general election: Enschede
Candidate	Party	Votes	%
Willem Jacob Geertsema	Lib	939	50.24
Jan van Alphen	AR	919	49.17
Others		11	0.59
Total		1,869	100.00
Valid votes		1,869	99.36
Invalid/blank votes		12	0.64
Total votes		1,881	100.00
Registered voters/turnout		1,996	94.24
Liberal gain			
Source: Electoral Council, Huygens Institute

=== Elections in the 1890s ===
1891 general election: Enschede
Candidate	Party	First round		Second round	
Candidate	Party	Votes	%	Votes	%
Willem Jacob Geertsema	Lib	965	44.68	1,138	51.35
J.H.A.M. Essink	Ka	853	39.49	1,078	48.65
Jan van Alphen	AR	168	7.78		
A.D. van Assendelft de Coningh	Lib	117	5.42		
Adriaan Gerhard	Soc	54	2.50		
Others		3	0.14		
Total		2,160	100.00	2,216	100.00
Valid votes		2,160	99.04	2,216	98.66
Invalid/blank votes		21	0.96	30	1.34
Total votes		2,181	100.00	2,246	100.00
Registered voters/turnout		2,347	92.93	2,347	95.70
Liberal hold					
Source: Electoral Council, Huygens Institute

1894 general election: Enschede
Candidate	Party	First round		Second round	
Candidate	Party	Votes	%	Votes	%
Antonius Franciscus Vos de Wael	Ka	781	40.36	1,049	53.17
R.E. Hattink	Lib	722	37.31	924	46.83
Willem Hendrik de Beaufort	Lib	432	22.33		
Others		0	0.00		
Total		1,935	100.00	1,973	100.00
Valid votes		1,935	98.98	1,973	97.72
Invalid/blank votes		20	1.02	46	2.28
Total votes		1,955	100.00	2,019	100.00
Registered voters/turnout		2,212	88.38	2,212	91.27
Catholic gain					
Source: Electoral Council, Huygens Institute (Note: The procès-verbal states the total number of valid votes as being 1,974, one more than the sum of the candidates' votes.)

1897 general election: Enschede
Candidate	Party	First round		Second round	
Candidate	Party	Votes	%	Votes	%
Antonius Franciscus Vos de Wael	Ka	3,475	42.62	3,929	46.40
Nicolaas Pierson	Lib	2,454	30.10	4,539	53.60
Henri van Kol	SDAP	1,337	16.40		
Johan Diederik Six	CHK	473	5.80		
Jan van Alphen	AR	414	5.08		
Total		8,153	100.00	8,468	100.00
Valid votes		8,153	99.62	8,468	99.72
Invalid/blank votes		31	0.38	24	0.28
Total votes		8,184	100.00	8,492	100.00
Registered voters/turnout		8,778	93.23	8,778	96.74
Liberal gain					
Source: Electoral Council, Huygens Institute

1897 Enschede by-election
Candidate	Party	First round		Second round	
Candidate	Party	Votes	%	Votes	%
J.H. ter Veer	Ka	3,238	40.81	3,877	47.22
Henri van Kol	SDAP	2,589	32.63	4,333	52.78
Gerrit Jannink	Lib	1,653	20.83		
Pieter van Vliet	AR	256	3.23		
Johan Diederik Six	CHK	199	2.51		
Total		7,935	100.00	8,210	100.00
Valid votes		7,935	98.99	8,210	98.83
Invalid/blank votes		81	1.01	97	1.17
Total votes		8,016	100.00	8,307	100.00
Registered voters/turnout		8,778	91.32	8,778	94.63
Social Democratic gain					
Source: Electoral Council, Huygens Institute

=== Elections in the 1900s ===
1901 general election: Enschede
Candidate	Party	First round		Second round	
Candidate	Party	Votes	%	Votes	%
Piet Aalberse Sr.	Ka	4,256	43.22	4,593	47.07
Henri van Kol	SDAP	3,321	33.72	5,165	52.93
Egbert Broer Kielstra	VL	2,271	23.06		
Total		9,848	100.00	9,758	100.00
Valid votes		9,848	99.21	9,758	98.70
Invalid/blank votes		78	0.79	129	1.30
Total votes		9,926	100.00	9,887	100.00
Registered voters/turnout		10,639	93.30	10,639	92.93
Social Democratic hold					
Source: Electoral Council, Huygens Institute

1905 general election: Enschede
Candidate	Party	First round		Second round	
Candidate	Party	Votes	%	Votes	%
Arnold Engels	Ka	6,192	45.92	6,440	46.84
Henri van Kol	SDAP	4,118	30.54	7,310	53.16
D. Brocx	Lib	3,020	22.40		
A. Kreuzen Azn.	CD	153	1.13		
Total		13,483	100.00	13,750	100.00
Valid votes		13,483	98.96	13,750	99.24
Invalid/blank votes		142	1.04	105	0.76
Total votes		13,625	100.00	13,855	100.00
Registered voters/turnout		14,396	94.64	14,396	96.24
Social Democratic hold					
Source: Electoral Council, Huygens Institute

1909 general election: Enschede
Candidate	Party	Votes	%
Gerrit Elhorst	AR	7,163	50.88
Henri van Kol	SDAP	4,882	34.68
C.K. Elout	Lib	2,033	14.44
Total		14,078	100.00
Valid votes		14,078	98.81
Invalid/blank votes		170	1.19
Total votes		14,248	100.00
Registered voters/turnout		15,251	93.42
Anti-Revolutionary gain			
Source: Electoral Council, Huygens Institute

=== Elections in the 1910s ===
1913 general election: Enschede
Candidate	Party	First round		Second round	
Candidate	Party	Votes	%	Votes	%
Gerrit Elhorst	AR	7,936	47.22	8,251	48.29
Willem Albarda	SDAP	5,325	31.69	8,836	51.71
C.A. Zelvelder	VD	3,349	19.93		
H. Gorter	SDP	196	1.17		
Total		16,806	100.00	17,087	100.00
Valid votes		16,806	98.55	17,087	99.43
Invalid/blank votes		248	1.45	98	0.57
Total votes		17,054	100.00	17,185	100.00
Registered voters/turnout		17,895	95.30	17,895	96.03
Social Democratic gain					
Source: Electoral Council, Huygens Institute

1917 general election: Enschede
Candidate	Party	Votes	%
Willem Albarda	SDAP	5,614	87.11
David Wijnkoop	SDP	831	12.89
Total		6,445	100.00
Valid votes		6,445	95.85
Invalid/blank votes		279	4.15
Total votes		6,724	100.00
Registered voters/turnout		19,303	34.83
Social Democratic hold			
Source: Electoral Council, Huygens Institute
