= De zusters Karamazov =

1957 song by Drs. P

"De zusters Karamazov" (The Karamazov Sisters) is a song from 1957 by Dutch poet and writer Drs. P.

== Storyline ==
The song describes in four stanzas the sad story of two sisters, living in Overveen, who have a disagreement on how to divide an inheritance that consists solely of dresses. In the end, one of the sisters decides to poison the other one. Upon concocting a poisoned drink, the first sister cannot resist having a taste in order to verify whether the recipe has worked out well. It turns out she has used the correct fatal dose and she drops dead instantly, leaving the other sister behind with all the dresses.

Refrain:

Terwijl de kater sliep,
en de pendule liep
en de kanarie sprak:
"Tsjiep, tsjiep, tsjiep, tsjiep".

While the tomcat slept
and the clock ticked
and the canary spoke:
"tweet, tweet, tweet, tweet".

The song is intended as entertainment, with a melancholic core: greed can lead to discord, annoyance and worse, maybe eventually even to murder. The name Karamazov (from the title) is mentioned nowhere in the song. The song is therefore also known by the (incorrect) name of "Tante Constance en tante Mathilde" ("Auntie Constanze and Auntie Mathilde").

== Cultural references ==
The title refers to the 1880 novel The Brothers Karamazov by Russian writer Fyodor Dostoevsky.

The melody of the chorus was derived from the first part of Wolfgang Amadeus Mozart’s Piano Sonata No. 11 in A major (K. 331).

In 2013, the American actress Christina Applegate explained to talk show host Conan O'Brien that her (Dutch) husband was teaching this song to their little daughter.
