= Drs. P =

Swiss singer-songwriter, poet and prose writer in Dutch

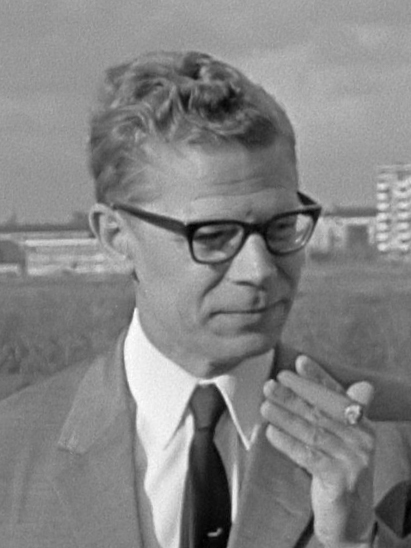
- Drs. P in 1969
- Born: Heinz Hermann Polzer; 24 August 1919; Thun, Switzerland
- Died: 13 June 2015 (aged 95); Amsterdam, Netherlands
- Occupations: Poet; singer-songwriter
- Relatives: Henri van Kol (grandfather); Nellie van Kol (grandmother)
- Writing career
- Pen name: Geo Staad; Coos Neetebeem (Note: An intentional comic misspelling of the name of the Dutch writer Cees Nooteboom.); Drandus P
- Language: Dutch

Heinz Hermann Polzer (Swiss Standard German: [haɪnts ˈhɛrman ˈpɔltsər]; 24 August 1919 – 13 June 2015), better known under his pseudonym Drs. P (Dutch: [dɔktoːˈrɑndʏs ˈpeː]), was a Swiss singer-songwriter, poet, and prose writer in the Dutch language. His lyrics and poems used dry humour and surprising twists, enabled by his vast vocabulary. He sang his lyrics with a distinctive shaky voice, while accompanying himself on the piano.

== Life and career ==
Heinz Hermann Polzer was born on 24 August 1919 in Thun in Switzerland. He had a Dutch mother and an Austrian father who had been naturalized into a Dutchman. However, being born in Switzerland, Polzer was of Swiss nationality, which he never changed.

After his parents divorced, when he was 3 years old, he and his mother moved to the Netherlands, where he grew up. His mother tongue was Dutch. He obtained a master's degree in economics at the Economische Hogeschool Rotterdam (currently Erasmus University Rotterdam). Thus, he was entitled to use the academic title of doctorandus (drs.).

In 1942, during the German occupation of the Netherlands, he wrote a children's story in a student magazine, about Dolf & Ben (Hitler & Mussolini) who were punished by Uncle Sam (the USA). He was imprisoned in the Oranjehotel for four months, which were extended by two months after he had drawn a card game featuring Hitler and Mussolini as jokers. Upon his release from prison, he fled to Switzerland, where he served in the military from 1942 to 1944. In 1945, he went to Paris to serve the Red Cross. After the German capitulation, he returned to the Netherlands.

In 1954, Polzer went to Indonesia, where he worked for an advertising company. He started to write songs. From 1965, he became known to a wide audience after a TV appearance in Willem Duys' programme. Duys styled him Drs. P, which he continued to use as his pseudonym. He wrote texts for cabarets by Hetty Blok, Gerard Cox, and Albert Mol.

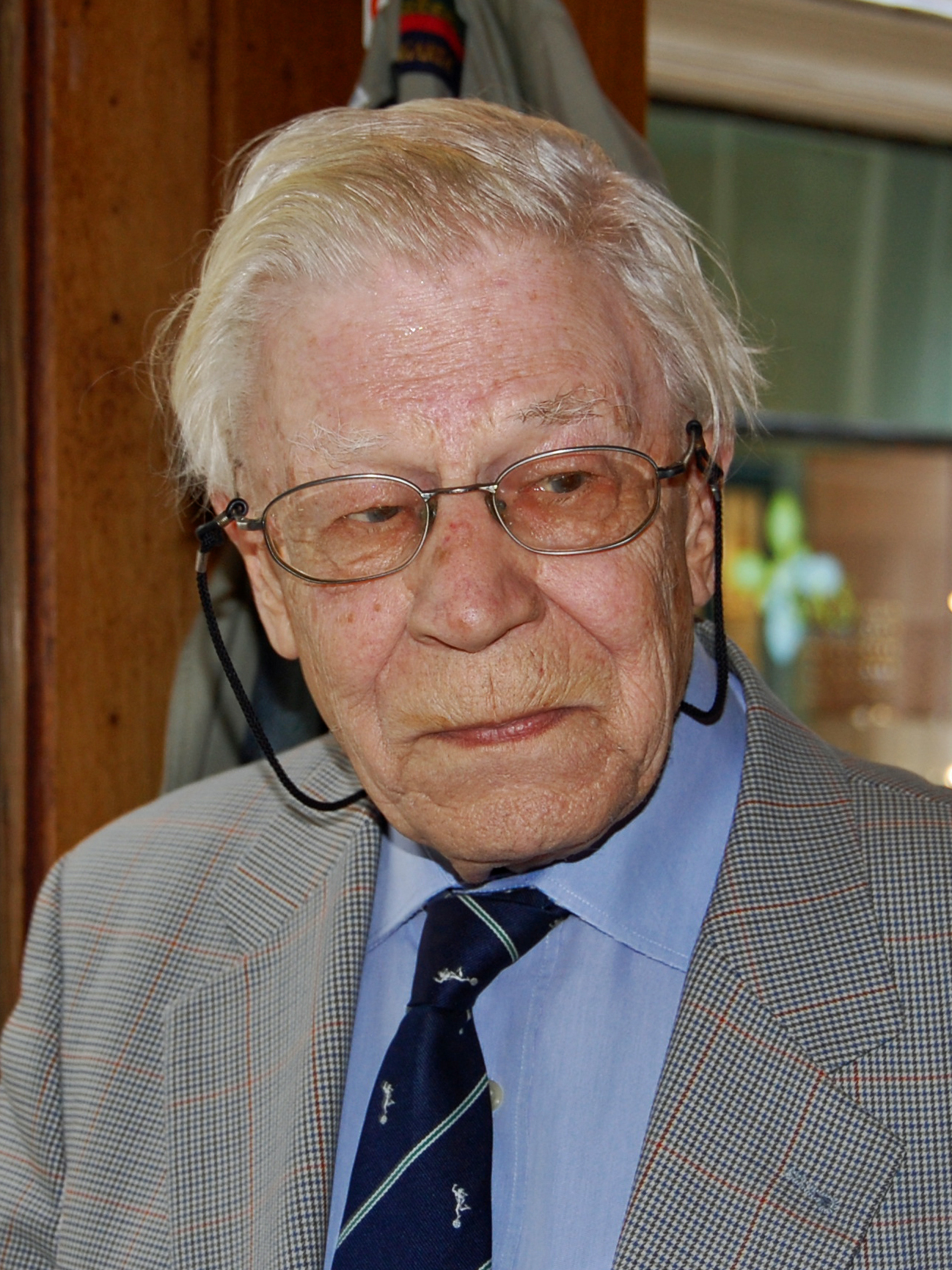
Drs. P in 2011

He also wrote the scripts for the comic strip Dan Teal by Johnn Bakker under the pseudonym "Geo Staad".

In 1998, he gave his last concert. A book with the texts of all his songs appeared on that day. During his lifetime he wrote hundreds of songs, thousands of poems, and a lot of prose under the pseudonym Drs. P. "Veerpont", "Dodenrit", and "De Zusters Karamazov" rank among his better-known humorous songs. He wrote a collection of poems in double dactyls (ollekebolleke in Dutch). Other poetry forms he invented were the balladet and the triolet.

Drs. P wrote and sang a series of songs about vegetables, such as broccoli, and about typical Dutch vegetables, called "Knolraap en lof, schorseneren en prei", which were collected in a songbook for gardeners (Tuindersliedboek, in Dutch).

== Discography ==
His discography consist of (at least) 40 titles of LP's, EP's and singles.

== Death ==
Drs. P. smoked cigars throughout his life, but as an old man wrote a poem that he regretted that he never dared to smoke a cigarette or marihuana. Drs. P. died of old age on 13 June 2015, aged 95, in Amsterdam. He wrote his own obituary, in the form of a double dactyl poem. A new double CD, Drs. P Retrouvé, was released in November 2016, featuring 31 songs recorded in 1972 and 1973 for the weekly radio show Poptater. Of the 31 songs, 12 had never been released before.

== Prizes ==
- De Nieuwe Clercke-Pico Bello-prijs (1979)
- Cestoda-prijs (1986)
- Kees Stip-prijs (1986)
- Golden Harp (1991)
- Edison Award (1992)
- Tollens Prize (2000)
- Special charter of the Dutch Language Union (2009)
