= Simon de la Bella =

Dutch trade unionist and politician (1889–1942)

- Simon de la Bella in 1938

Member of the Senate
- In office 17 September 1935 – 11 July 1942

Personal details
- Born: Simon de la Bella; 28 October 1889 Amsterdam, Netherlands
- Died: 11 July 1942 (aged 52) Dachau concentration camp, Germany
- Party: SDAP
- Spouse: Hinderientje "Riek" van Zuiden (m. 1914)
- Children: 1

Simon de la Bella Jr. (28 October 1889 – 11 July 1942) was a Dutch trade unionist and politician. He was a prominent member of the Dutch Confederation of Trade Unions (NVV), serving as its first secretary and vice-chair from 1936 until 1940. He was also a member of the Dutch Senate from 1935 until his death in 1942. De la Bella died in Dachau concentration camp on 11 July 1942.

== Early life ==
Simon de la Bella was born on 28 October 1889 in Amsterdam to Aron Samuel de la Bella, a diamond cleaver, and Cato van Vriesland. Despite not being born with the designation, De la Bella would in later years adopt the suffix Jr. as part of his name. After finishing his primary education, De la Bella became a junior clerk at a shipping office, before working at a trading firm and an enamel factory.

== Union career ==
At the relatively young age of 28, De la Bella became office manager at the headquarters of the Dutch Confederation of Trade Unions (NVV) in September 1917. He became second chair of the General Dutch Union of Trade and Office Workers (ANBHK) in 1919, and chair of the union's Amsterdam branch in February 1920, before joining the executive board of the Dutch Confederation of Trade Unions (NVV) in 1921, where his activities kept him so busy he was forced to resign his position at the ANBHK in 1923.

In 1924, De la Bella became treasurer and second secretary of the NVV, and was promoted to first secretary in 1930. He wrote actively on labour and economic issues, publishing pamphlets and reports on health insurance funds in 1923 and on annual leave policies and a shortened work week between 1925 and 1933.

De la Bella served as the representative of the NVV in various other organisations, including the Cooperative Council, funds for public buildings and health insurance funds, and De Arbeiderspers. In 1925, De la Bella joined the executive of the Institute of Workers' Development (Instituut voor Arbeidersontwikkeling; IvAO), jointly founded by the SDAP and NVV a year prior. In 1928, he became its chair, and fought for the IvAO's independence and against SDAP efforts to reorganise it.

As NVV vice-chair, he presided over the adoption of a financial program in 1934, which included support for a more progressive income tax, but faced opposition from SDAP leaders Willem Vliegen and Willem Albarda over De la Bella's persistent efforts to adopt said measure. Over the opposition of figures within the SDAP, De la Bella participated in the drafting of the Plan of Labour, the SDAP's economic proposals to combat the Great Depression, and became one of its staunchest defenders within the party and later in the Senate. Joint efforts between the SDAP and NVV to have the Plan of Labour adopted were ended in 1937 after Albarda accused De la Bella of unjustly seeking political leadership. In the years after, De la Bella would continue advocating for a more planned and state-led economy, writing several books on the subject in 1937 and 1939.

In 1935, De la Bella was chosen as a member of the Senate for the Social Democratic Workers' Party (SDAP). As a senator, he was the SDAP's spokesperson on economic affairs, agriculture, and water infrastructure. In September 1936, he spoke in the Senate against plans of the Third Colijn cabinet to cut support for the unemployed, after which a plan by the Roman Catholic State Party to reverse these plans was passed successfully. De la Bella was one of three SDAP senators to vote against defence spending in 1938, holding on to the SDAP's old stance on military disarmament.

== World War II and death ==
In 1939, as a consequence of the increasing threat of war, the NVV sent five million guilders of its funds to the United Kingdom, and decided that in case of war De la Bella, along with his successor as NVV treasurer, would attempt to reach the UK. Following the German invasion of the Netherlands in May 1940, De la Bella attempted but failed to flee to Britain.

On 16 July, the German occupation forces took over the NVV, putting in charge the fascist Hendrik Jan Woudenberg, who immediately purged De la Bella from the organisation. Four days later, De la Bella was arrested for having sent NVV funds to the UK the year prior. While being transported to prison, De la Bella attempted to commit suicide by taking poison, but the attempt failed and he was transported to a hospital to have his stomach pumped. While imprisoned, he shared a cell with Henri Polak, and was initially much weakened as a result of his earlier suicide attempt. On 4 September, De la Bella was deported to Germany, where he would end up in Dachau concentration camp.

Simon de la Bella died on 11 July 1941 in Dachau, either due to being murdered by gassing, or of a lung infection.

== Personal life ==
De la Bella married Hinderientje "Riek" van Zuiden on 25 November 1914, with whom he would have one daughter. His only daughter Carla was active in the Dutch resistance during World War II.

== Bibliography ==
- Presser, J. (1965). Ondergang. De vervolging en verdelging van het Nederlandse jodendom 1940-1945 [Demise. The persecution and extermination of Dutch Jewry 1940-1945] (in Dutch). the Hague: Staatsuitgeverij. ISBN 978-90-12-04893-4.
