= Emilie Claeys =

Belgian feminist and socialist (1855-1943)

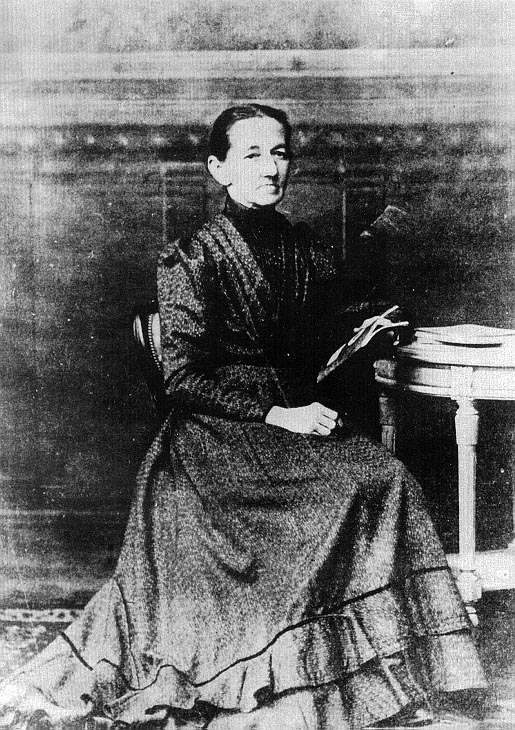
Emilie Claeys

Emilie Maria Claeys (8 or 9 May 1855 - 16 February 1943) was a Belgian feminist and socialist.

== Biography ==
Emilie Claeys was born in Ghent in 1855 as daughter of a labourer who died young. She worked as a spinner and a maidservant before becoming politically active from 1886 on. Raised a Catholic, she lost her faith as an adult. She was an unmarried mother of two by the age of 26.

In 1886 she founded and became president of the "Socialistische Propagandaclub voor Vrouwen" (the Socialist Propaganda Club for Women) in Ghent; this club organised a school for adult women, where they studied French, reading, writing and mathematics. They also organised lectures, reading clubs, art evenings, .. all with the goal of "pull women away from the double morality of men and capitalism". Her goal was the emancipation of women, both in marriage and at the workplace: socialism was only a means to get that goal.

In 1891 she wrote the pamphlet "Een woord aan de vrouwen" ("A word to the women"), about the roles of men and women in education: and in 1892 followed "Het vrouwenstemrecht", about the right for women to vote, a subject she also tackled in multiple lectures in those years, e.g. for the congress of the Belgian Labour Party in April 1893. She was elected there as a member of the party council, and was the first woman to reach this position; she also participated at the International Socialist Congress in Zurich in the same year. In 1895 she left the party again, because she didn't receive sufficient support for her positions.

Still in 1893, she launched together with the Dutch feminist Nellie van Kol the "Hollandsch-Vlaamsche Vrouwenbond" ("Dutch-Flemish Women's Union"), and its biweekly magazine "De Vrouw". In this magazine she published the article "Een ernstig woord" ("A serious word"). The same article was also published as a pamphlet, but nearly all 500 copies were seized by law enforcement. The article promoted birth restriction, and was probably the first such article in Flanders. The subject was highly controversial, and not supported by her own party.

Between 1892 and 1896 Claeys printed and published the socialist newspaper Vooruit (Forward), and during the same period she was a governor of the Bond Moyson, a socialist health insurance. In 1896 she started to live together with a married man, and she was attacked about this in the newspaper Het Volk. Claeys denied having a relation with the man, but in November she was caught in adultery by the police: afterwards she resigned from the newspaper and from the Socialistische Propagandaclub voor Vrouwen, which soon afterwards folded. Only her work with "De Vrouw" continued until 1900. After this, her role at the forefront of feminism in Flanders was done. Claeys continued to live in Ghent, converted to Protestantism, and died in poverty in 1943.
