= Catholic Comprehensive School, Breul =

Location
- Arnhemsebovenweg, Breul, Zeist; Netherlands; 52°04′06″N 5°15′34″E

Information
- Motto: Mutual trust
- Religious affiliation: Catholicism
- Denomination: Jesuit (former)
- Established: 1831; 195 years ago
- Rector: Van den Broek-Hanskamp
- Staff: 140 teachers
- Grades: VMBO-II, HAVO, atheneum, gymnasium
- Gender: Coeducational
- Enrollment: 1,560
- Locations: 1831 Katwijk aan den Rijn; 1928 The Hague; 1946 Breul
- Website: www.de-breul.nl

Catholic Comprehensive School, Breul, is a Catholic secondary school for VMBO, HAVO, Atheneum and Gymnasium, near Zeist. It is one of the colleges founded by the Society of Jesus in the Netherlands, in 1831, and has undergone several moves since then.

== History ==
The school began as a private, Catholic, boys boarding school in 1831 in Katwijk aan den Rijn and in 1842 became a work of the Jesuits. In 1928 it moved to The Hague and in 1946 to an estate in Breul, between Zeist and Driebergen. In 1953 a new building was built which still stands and displays the school's motto Mutua Fides (mutual trust).

Girls were admitted from 1966 and in 1968 it merged with other girl's and boy's schools, and has been growing ever since. The boarding school, which accommodated 150 boys, remained until 1981. The current school building opened in 1980. The last Jesuits retired from the faculty in the 1980s and since then the school has become more generic Christian.

The students have long been included on the committee that hires teachers and evaluates them before issuing further contracts, through Representation of Students in Appointment Procedures (VLIB). The practice has drawn the attention of the national press. The VLIB organizes an assessment of teachers in their first year, through surveys in three classes, in the first and second half of the school year. Based on the results of the second evaluation VLIB pupils provide advice to the rector on whether to grant tenure to the teacher.

As of 2016 the school had about 1,600 students, of which 42% were in the first two years. The school was then controlled by an interim administration.

== See also ==
- List of Jesuit schools
- List of Jesuit sites in the Netherlands
