= Centre-left politics =

Political orientation

Centre-left politics is the range of left-wing political ideologies that lean closer to the political centre. Ideologies commonly associated with it include social democracy, social liberalism, progressivism, and green politics. Ideas commonly supported by the centre-left include welfare capitalism, social justice, liberal internationalism, and multiculturalism. Economically, the centre-left supports a mixed economy in a democratic capitalist system, often including economic interventionism, progressive taxation, and the right to unionize. Centre-left politics are contrasted with far-left politics that reject capitalism or advocate revolution.

The centre-left developed with the rest of the left–right political spectrum in 18th and 19th century France, where the centre-left included those who supported transfer of powers from the monarchy to parliament or endorsed moderate republicanism. Early progressivism and left liberalism evolved in the late-19th and early-20th centuries in Western Europe and the United States, while social democracy split from revolutionary socialism, which became associated with communism, and advocated reformist socialist positions. Social democracy became the dominant ideology in Western Europe during the post–World War II economic expansion and it spread to Africa after decolonization.

Centre-left economics declined in popularity following the 1973–1975 recession and was replaced by neoliberalism. In the 1990s, Third Way politics emerged as a centrist variant of social democracy in Europe, and centre-left politics spread to Latin America during the pink tide. In the 21st century, centre-left politics are challenged by the developments of the Digital Revolution, the subsumption of the lower class into the middle class in developed nations, and an increase in support for populism.

== Ideologies ==
The ideologies of the centre-left include social democracy, social liberalism, progressivism, and green politics. Centre-left politics often incorporate elements of libertarianism and occasionally favour limited state intervention. As with all political alignments, the exact boundaries of centre-left versus far-left or centrist politics are not clearly defined and can vary depending on context. Centre-left ideologies are common in stable political systems, which typically allow for political debate with an ideological centre.

=== Social democracy ===
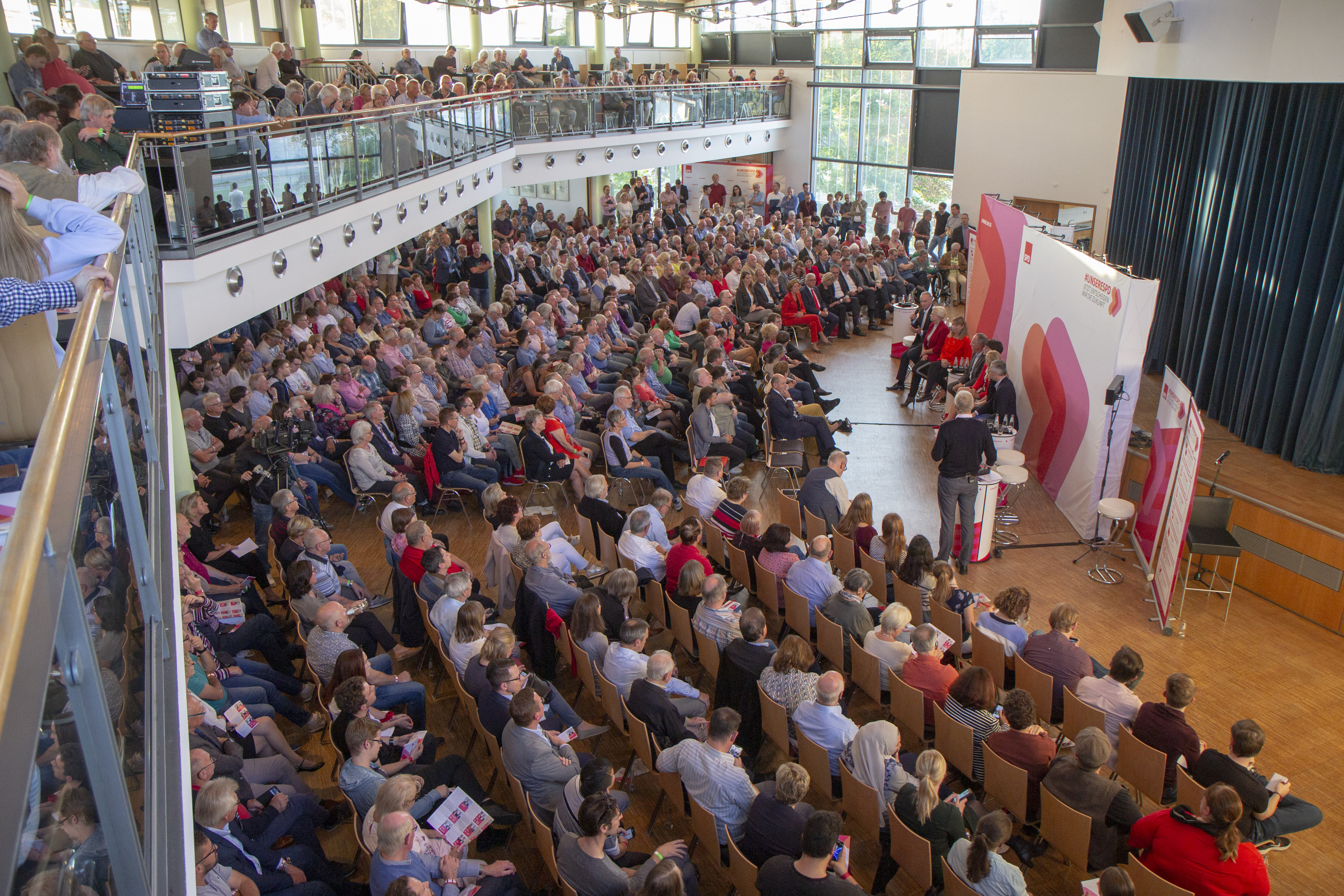
2019 regional conference of the Social Democratic Party of Germany in Nieder-Olm

Social democracy is a reformist offshoot of socialism that supports the modification of capitalist economies rather than their total abolition. It seeks to regulate capitalism to protect social equality, advocating reforms that benefit the entire people and the common good while rejecting the Marxist position of aligning specifically with the working class. Liberty under social democracy is defined as a collective concept based in equality rather than an individualist concept. Democratization, the welfare state, public education, and Keynesian economics are all major components of social democratic politics.

Social democracy has influenced the politics of nearly every major democracy; however, it has historically been most successful in the European Union, where it was the predominant ideology from 1945 to 1973. Sweden in particular has historically been closely associated with social democracy, as it was the first country to be led by a social democratic party, and social democrats in Sweden continued to be relevant even after the ideology lost influence in other countries during the 1970s. Social democracy also became a popular ideology in many African governments after the decolonisation of Africa.

=== Social liberalism ===
Social liberalism, or left liberalism, overlaps significantly with social democracy. This form of liberalism argues in favour of capitalism and the benefits it provides for society, but it also advocates regulations to reduce wealth inequality. It rejects the idea that the upper class seeks to harm or exploit members of society, instead arguing that these are unintentional effects of laissez-faire economics. Left liberalism supports liberal capitalism and a mixed economy, which have been adopted by virtually all liberal nations. Political pluralism and strong social institutions are prioritized by liberalism.

Social liberalism was developed in the United Kingdom in the mid-20th century, where it took the form of new liberalism. The identification of centre-left ideologies as "liberal" is most common to the United States. Liberalism is less common in regions such as Africa and Asia, where there is no individualist or liberal democratic tradition.

=== Progressivism ===
Progressivism is the support of continuous social reform to improve society gradually, opposing revolutionary or conservative politics. It is typically associated with the centre-left ideologies of social liberalism and social democracy, though communist and centrist ideologies have sometimes been involved in progressive politics. There is great divergence within the progressive movement, with disagreement in what reforms should be attempted and how they can be implemented, though redistributive policies are a common theme within progressivism. Progressivism first developed in the United Kingdom and the United States during the 19th century.

=== Green politics ===
Green politics is an ideological movement that advocates a political focus on ecology and nonviolence. It challenges modern industrialisation and institutions through a lens of social justice while rejecting traditional political philosophy and organization. Definitions of the scope of green politics may vary; it may be limited to explicitly environmentalist parties, or it may broadly cover political movements descended from New Left or left-libertarian ideas. Besides environmentalism, green politics often includes support for disarmament, ending nuclear power, decentralized democracy, feminism, and immigration.

Green politics developed from various left-wing ideologies, including social democracy and Marxism, in the 1970s. It was initially developed in Australia and New Zealand, and it first gained influence in Germany as a response to the Cold War and environmental issues. The presence of green politics in national government is mostly limited to Western Europe, Australia, and New Zealand, though green political parties briefly held influence during the postcommunist period of Eastern Europe. Green political parties have been most successful in Belgium, Finland, France, and Germany, where they integrated into the national party system.

=== Related ideologies ===
In addition to the most common centre-left ideologies, other ideologies are sometimes described as centre-left or have centre-left variants. Democratic socialism supports the abolition of capitalism in favour of socialism, though it opposes the creation of a communist state. It was historically seen as a centre-left position, and may sometimes be described as such; however, modern democratic socialism is typically considered radical in nature and distinct from centre-left ideologies. The Third Way is a variation of social democratic politics that gained prominence in the 1990s after the decline of traditional social democracy. It advocates reform of the social democratic model to emphasize equal opportunity over equality of outcome. To accomplish this, it supports heavy deregulation and privatization for the purpose of increasing economic growth to fund public goods such as education, healthcare, and pensions. The Third Way may be defined as centre-left or as centrist.

Christian democracy is an ideology that incorporates Catholic social teaching into a secular political philosophy. Though most enduring Christian democratic parties are centrist, those in Latin America have historically ranged across the political spectrum, with centre-left and centre-right variants both being common. Christian democrats often support the welfare state, and social justice has been a frequent theme among Christian democracy parties in Latin America. Christian democracy in Europe is not usually associated with the centre-left, instead favouring the centre-right.

Though it is often associated with conservatism, some elements of Confucianism invoke ideas that are associated with the centre-left in Western countries. Promotion of general welfare, supporting members of the family, and the ideal of the Harmonious Society all have implications for centre-left politics. The welfare state of East Asian countries such as Japan, Singapore, South Korea, and Taiwan are sometimes described as Confucian. These welfare systems have been influenced by Confucian familialism, which shifts some of the burden of welfare from the state to the family.

== Positions ==
Centre-left politics seeks equal opportunity in society. Centre-left groups are more likely to prioritize issues of long-term or abstract importance than other ideological groups. These include environmentalism, the arts, science, social equality, and foreign aid. Advocates of centre-left politics typically support laws and government programs to support marginalized groups such as the elderly, disabled, and unemployed. Measures to this effect include financial assistance and anti-discrimination laws.

Liberal internationalism is associated with the centre-left through its idealism, constructivism, and progressivism. Liberal internationalists seek cooperation between nations, often including support for common security and arms control between nations to facilitate peace. The centre-left, along with the centre-right, implemented this foreign policy in Europe during the Cold War, but it has become less prominent due to the rise of anti-globalist far-right parties.

The immigration policies of centre-left groups vary depending on the political circumstances of a given country, and they may seek to greatly expand or greatly restrict immigration. In principle, centre-left parties generally believe in multiculturalism and support high immigration. The key issue of centre-left immigration policy is the balance between egalitarianism and pragmatism. The centre-left often faces pressures from working class voters to restrict immigration to prevent competition over jobs and public services. Other centre-left policies can also be negatively impacted by immigration, as a large increase in low-skilled workers can raise concerns about the increased price of public services, prompting spending cuts and roll-backs of centre-left welfare policies.

Though positions on environmentalism are not consistent across centre-left parties, they are more likely to support environmentalist policies than centre-right parties. Centre-left parties are popularly associated with environmental policies in the minds of voters, which earns them support in good economic conditions but loses them support in poor economic conditions. Environmentalism is a major component of green politics.

=== Economics ===
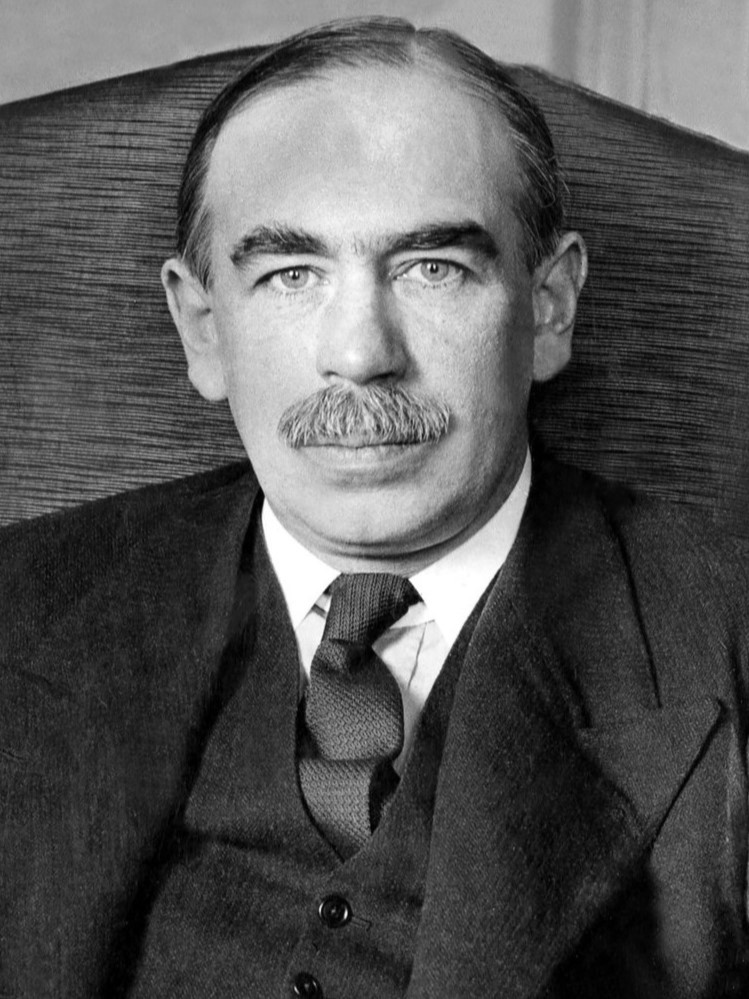
The economic thought of John Maynard Keynes (pictured in 1929) has been influential on centre-left politics

Centre-left groups generally support a mixed economy with moderate economic interventionism. Keynesian economics has historically seen support among the centre-left. This is an interventionist economic philosophy that emphasizes income rather than pricing. These ideas have since declined in popularity in favour of balanced budgets and low government spending. Closely related to centre-left politics are concepts of the welfare state and regulated labour markets. In the 20th century, trade unions and their working class constituency were closely associated with social democratic and labour parties, especially in Scandinavia, the United Kingdom, and former British colonies in the Pacific. These associations generally lessened by the end of the century as union membership declined and centre-left parties shifted toward Third Way politics, which introduced elements of neoliberalism into centre-left politics, increasing the focus on free markets. Labour-government relations and the right to unionize have been less prominent ideas in East Asia.

Centre-left politics often involve transfer payment systems, such as welfare and early childhood education, with the goal of creating higher employment while avoiding a welfare trap. Closely associated with this is the implementation of a progressive tax, in which higher earnings are taxed at higher rates. Some early centre-left groups supported gradual reform toward socialism, but this position is not supported by the centre-left in the 21st century. The modern centre-left distinguishes between just and unjust capitalism, advocating for welfare state policies to create what it considers to be just capitalism. Through the late 20th and early 21st centuries, the centre-left has been more likely to benefit electorally during periods of economic growth and suffer electorally in economic downturn.

The core objective underlying centre-left economic policies, democratic capitalism, has largely been achieved within many economies, with further policies seeking to merely reform or improve upon this system. These may include measures to reduce poverty or to support lower-wage workers. One common dispute within the centre-left is the extent to which centre-left parties should reform markets versus regulating pre-existing markets. Centre-left parties in Europe and the United States have supported corporate governance reform to protect the investments of shareholders.

The economies of Nordic countries such as Denmark and Sweden are often upheld by proponents of centre-left economic policies as successful applications of these policies. These economies heavily emphasize international trade as well as collaboration between government, industry, and labour. In post-war Europe, West Germany established the socioeconomic model of a social market economy, a regulated market economic system that promoted free markets and fair competition with regulation for social policies and a welfare state.

== History ==
=== Origins ===
The centre-left is descended from left-wing politics, which originated in the French Revolution and in the response to early capitalism. In France, the early centre-left was led by Adolphe Thiers, head of the liberal-nationalist Movement Party. The centre-left was Orléanist, but supported a liberal interpretation of the Charter of 1830, more power to the Parliament, manhood suffrage and support to rising European nationalisms. Thiers served as Prime Minister for King Louis Philippe I twice (in 1836 and 1840), but he then lost the king's favour, and the centre-left rapidly fell. The centre-left during the Second Republic and the Second Empire was commonly associated with the Moderate Republicans. Thiers restored the centre-left to prominence in the Third Republic, where it was led by the liberal republican Opportunist faction.

Elsewhere in Europe, centre-left movements appeared from the 1860s, mainly in Spain and Italy. In Italy, the centre-left was born as coalition between the liberal Camillo Benso, Count of Cavour and the progressive Urbano Rattazzi, the heads respectively of the Right and Left groupings in Parliament. This alliance was called "connubio" ("marriage") for its opportunist characteristics. Liberalism was typically associated with the centre-right in the late 19th century, but liberal parties in France, Switzerland, and the United Kingdom adopted left liberal policies through coalitions of middle and working class voters that survived until World War I.

Progressivism developed as a school of thought within British and American centre-left politics in the mid-19th century. Early progressive thought developed from modernism and humanism, manifesting as calls for reform. It developed as a political movement in the late-19th and early-20th centuries as it was adopted by social liberal and social democratic parties. Unlike later social democratic movements, social democracy in the 19th century held socialist society as an eventual goal. The first social democratic party was established in Germany in 1863.

=== Early 20th century ===
Social democracy had developed as a major political movement in Europe by the early 20th century as a response to the strength of capitalism. Challenging the idea that capitalism was nearing an implosion, reformist socialists such as Eduard Bernstein rejected Marxist ideas of historical materialism and class conflict, and social democrats established themselves as a reformist alternative to the revolutionary left, arguing that societal improvements within capitalist democracy would better serve the working class. This philosophy became widely popular among the European left after World War I, which had convinced many contemporary leftists that national identity was more important to the working class than class solidarity, which would render Marxism unviable. This was reinforced by the wave of democracy that followed, allowing socialists to participate in electoral politics.

Social democrats made up the centre-left during the interwar period in Europe, advocating government regulation and intervention in opposition to the passive policies of the predominant Marxist and classical liberal parties. The centre-left and the centre-right in this period were primarily divided by their stance on trade unions, with social democracy advocating greater powers for unions in collective bargaining. In Western Europe, the centre-left supported the Plan De Man. During the Great Depression in the 1930s, social democracy became a viable alternative to other left-wing ideologies, and state intervention saw popular support throughout the western world. It was also seen as a potential means to counteract rising far-right movements that were developing in Europe. The centre-left was particularly strong in Sweden, which was the only country at the time to have ruling party that was explicitly social democratic, the Swedish Social Democratic Party. Other European countries with social democratic governments included Denmark, Norway, and Czechoslovakia. The Democratic Party in the United States also implemented centre-left policies with the New Deal, as a lack of ties to socialist groups allowed for a stronger centre-left relative to other countries.

=== Post-war politics ===
Centre-left ideas proliferated rapidly after the Great Depression and World War II. A post-war consensus formed among policymakers in Western Europe that rejected both classical liberalism and democratic socialism in favour of social democratic ideals. With the end of fascism, countries in Western Europe adopted social democracy and liberal democracy. Social democracy was widely adopted and implemented in much of Europe, both by centre-left and by traditionally centre-right parties. Social liberalism was developed in the United Kingdom by liberal politicians such as John Maynard Keynes and William Beveridge, who advocated market restrictions to the benefit of the public. Keynesian economics became the mainstream in Western Europe during the 1950s and 1960s, while the social market economy was developed by social democrats in Germany at the same time. As social democracy became influential in Europe, the United Nations considered the New International Economic Order plan that would facilitate social democratic governments in developing nations.

Centre-left politics were historically unpopular in Latin America, and left-wing candidates were kept out of power through both right-wing dictatorships and through conservative victories in fair elections. In the mid-20th century, centre-left politics supported state-led development and industrialization in the region, which allowed redistributive and socially inclusive policies to be implemented. In East Asia, interventionism and developmental policy were adopted by right-wing parties rather than centre-left parties.

Keynesian economics declined in popularity after the end of the post-war consensus, spurred by the 1970s energy crisis and the subsequent recession. The centre-left parties that had held power to that point received much of the blame for the economic crises, and support for the centre-left declined in favour of conservative neoliberalism. At the same time, the end of several right-wing dictatorships in Southern Europe prompted support for centre-left politics among these countries in the 1970s. A decline in the relevance of trade unions, historically a prominent voter group for social democratic parties, contributed to the limited success of centre-left politics in the 1980s. Furthermore, centre-left policies faced new challenges that necessitated a reconsideration of the welfare state, including population ageing that threatened pension programs and women in the workforce that heavily altered the job market. Green political parties first became prominent in the 1980s when they became influential in European politics.

=== Late 20th century ===
Third Way politics developed as a prominent form of centre-left politics, beginning with the Australian governments of Bob Hawke and Paul Keating in the 1980s and 1990s. Similar movements developed elsewhere, including in Germany and New Zealand. Centre-left parties in Latin America also shifted from social democracy to social liberalism in a pragmatic attempt to reach voters. The most prominent adoption of Third Way politics was that of New Labour in the United Kingdom. Centre-left politics remained unpopular in much of Continental Europe at this time. Third Way politics lost support among the centre-left after the early 2000s, and neo-Keynesianism regained popularity.

Centre-left ideologies were among those uplifted by the pink tide in Latin America in the late 1990s. Early centre-left politics and progressivism in Latin America has focused heavily on the inclusion of previously excluded groups in society through citizenship and its associated rights. Income inequality also became a major focus, and centre-left parties in the region promote redistributive policy. Liberalism in Latin America has historically been conservative and oligarchic rather than a centre-left liberalism of progressivism or egalitarianism. Several centre-left parties supported reforms toward economic liberalism in line with those supported by their right-wing counterparts, in some cases leading to backlash that saw incumbent centre-left leaders replaced by far-left populists.

Ideological diversity developed in Africa after the end of the decolonization period, which had been dominated by far-left politics. Most post-colonial African political parties adopted some form of socialism or social democracy, though social democratic policies have seen limited success due to the unstable nature of democracy in Africa.

=== Early 21st century ===
By the beginning of the 21st century, the centre-left had almost entirely overtaken further left groups in politics globally, with other forms of left-wing politics seeing little support in democratic nations. Globalization and the Digital Revolution altered the objectives and demographics of the centre-left, as the working class has been largely subsumed by the middle class in developed nations due to increased living standards and the establishment of a knowledge economy. Of those in service industry careers, class is not a unifying or significant aspect of personal identity. In particular, this shift has caused People's Parties based on mass mobilization to be less viable. These rapid developments in society during the turn of the century caused distress among voters, including increased perceptions of social inequality and fear of change, causing voters to move away from traditional centre-left ideologies toward populism.

The Great Recession exacerbated this trend, bringing significant challenges to the rule of centre-left parties, particularly those with social democratic leanings. In Europe, this brought about a period of Pasokification in which social democratic parties saw large declines during the 2010s, largely being replaced by far-left and right-wing populist parties. The centre-left's stance on immigration in Europe was one of multiculturalism, further pushing working class voters from the centre-left to the far-right. In some cases, centre-left and centre-right politics in these countries became less distinct as political cleavages shifted toward populist versus traditional politics. The Arab Spring in the Middle East and North Africa supported ideals often associated with social democracy and the centre-left.

== See also ==
- Centre-right politics
- Distributism
- Eco-capitalism
- Green liberalism
- Green libertarianism
- Green politics
- Hard left
- Left–right political spectrum
- List of left-wing political parties
- Neoclassical liberalism
- Social democracy
- Soft left
