= Jan van Leeuwen =

Jan van Leeuwen may refer to:

- Jan van Leeuwen (late 13th century), author of the Rhyming Chronicle of Worringen
- Jan van Leeuwen (mystic) (died 1378)
- Jan van Leeuwen (classicist) (1850–1924)
- Jan van Leeuwen (computer scientist) (born 1946)
