= Henri van Kol =

Dutch politician (1852–1925)

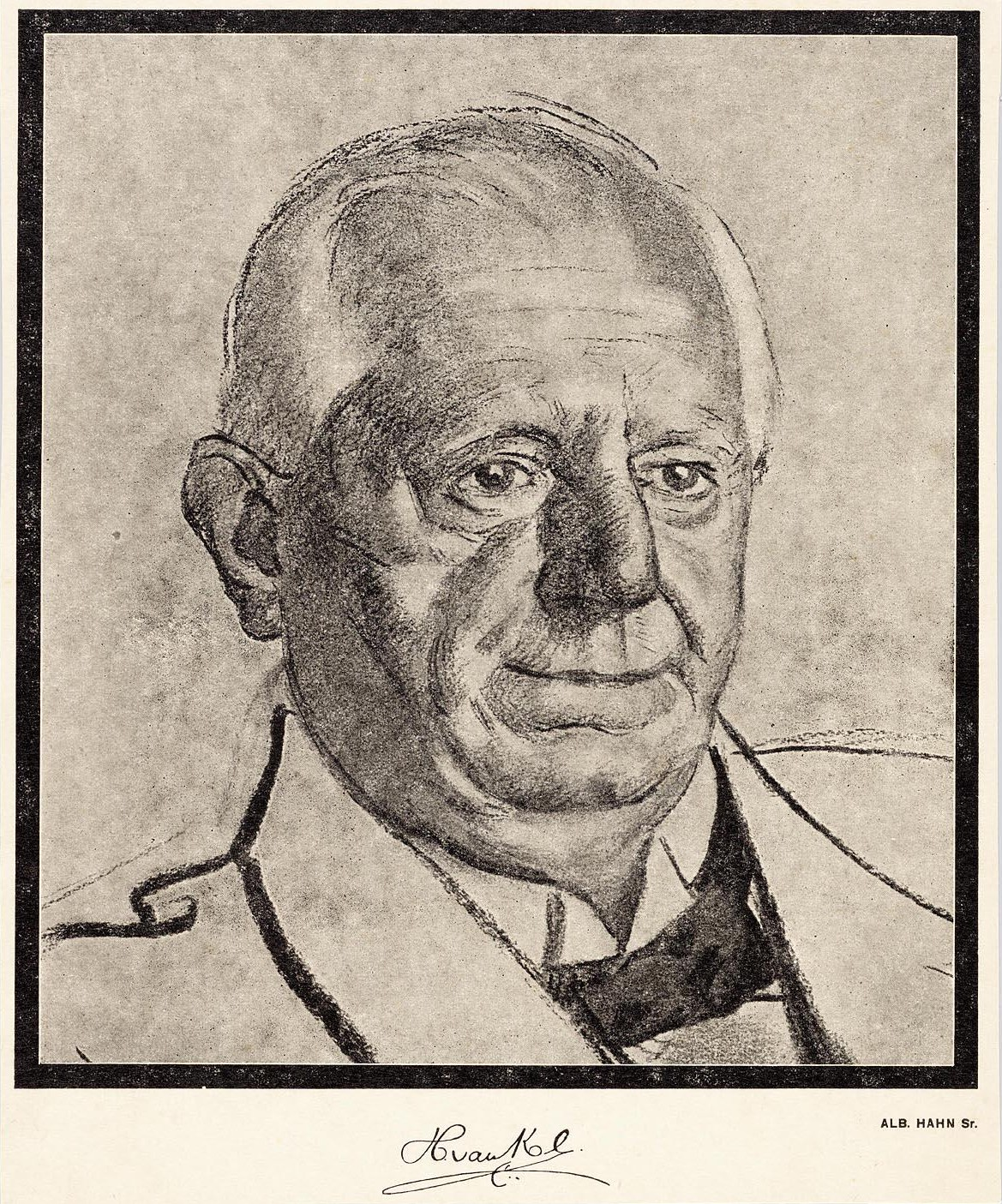
- Henri van Kol (1918) by Albert Hahn
- Born: Hendrikus Hubertus van Kol; 23 May 1852; Eindhoven, Netherlands
- Died: 22 August 1925 (aged 73); Aywaille, Belgium
- Occupations: Member of parliament, engineer, coffee plantation investor
- Spouse: Nellie van Kol (m. 1883; sep. 1919)
- Relatives: Drs. P (Heinz Hermann Polzer, grandson)

Henri van Kol, also known as Henri Hubert van Kol (23 May 1852 — 22 August 1925), was a Dutch politician, engineer, and part owner of a coffee plantation in the East Indies. In the first half of the 1870s, he studied hydraulic engineering at Polytechnic School in Delft, during which he was introduced and became increasingly interested in socialism that supported colonialism. Van Kol went to Indonesia where he worked as an engineer, met the woman who became his wife, Nellie van Kol, and they had their children.

He wrote under his own name, and a pseudonym, about his socialistic viewpoints. He became the first socialist in the East Indies. In 1876, he joined the First International. Van Kol was a member of the Social Democratic League (SDB), a Dutch socialist political party, and broke away from the party to co-found the Social Democratic Workers' Party (SDAP) in 1894. From 1897 to 1909, van Kol a member of the House of Representatives.

== Early life, education, and military ==
Hendrikus Hubertus (Henri) van Kol was born in Eindhoven, Netherlands on 23 May 1852 to Maria Anna Schutjes and Christianus Adrianus Hubertus van Kol, a wealthy merchant and hotelier. He was the eldest child with four younger siblings. He attended an Eindhoven primary school; Turnhout, Belgium secondary school; and Hoogere Burger High School in Roermond, Netherlands. In 1870, he enrolled in the Polytechnic School in Delft to study hydraulic engineering. He graduated in 1875. He read Der Volksstaat, published by Wilhelm Liebknecht, and Das Kapital by Karl Marx, and other socialist publications. He joined socialist groups and heard about noted socialists, including Ferdinand Lassalle, during the years he attended the Polytechnic School.

As a child, van Kol fought for those beaten, a trend that continued throughout his life. He was imprisoned after he attacked policemen who tortured a man. He fought for the Communards in Paris in 1871 (following the Franco-Prussian War).

== The Netherlands and East Indies ==
Born in the Netherlands, van Kol moved to the East Indian Archipelago and began his engineering career there. He also started his marital life and became a father in the East Indies.

== Marriage and children ==
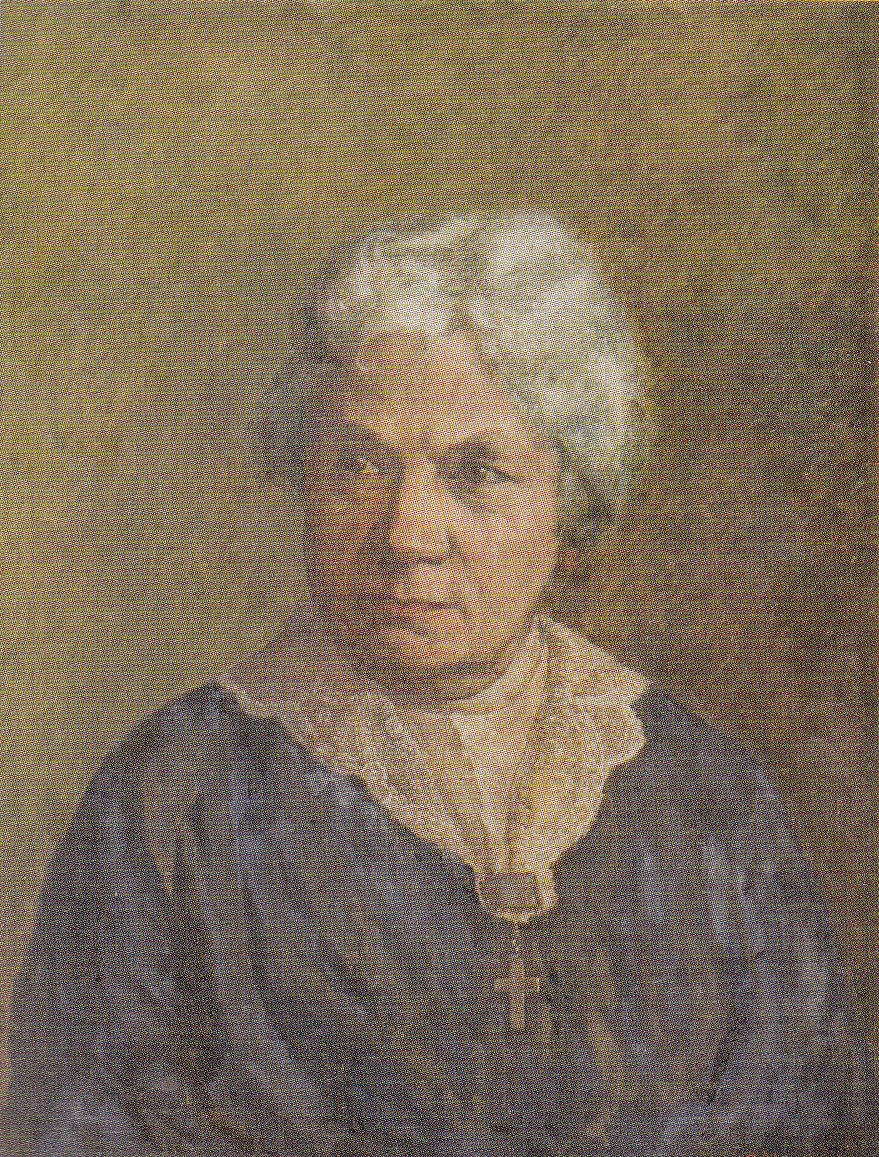
Nellie van Kol, 1931

On 27 July 1883, Van Kol married Jacoba Maria Petronella (Nellie) Porreij, becoming Nellie van Kol. They lived in Java, Indonesia. and had two children who survived infancy and two who died shortly about the time of their birth. Their first child was a stillborn baby in 1884, and he went on a medical leave of absence for a problem with his liver that required a stay in Europe for about a year. Their daughter Lili was born in Switzerland in 1886. (Lili's son was Heinz Hermann Polzer, known as Drs. P.) The family moved to Bandung, West Java. In 1891, they had a stillborn son. In 1891, they had a son named after Domela Nieuwenhuis, the baby's godfather, in Cheribon (now Cirebon ), northern Java. The following year the family lived in Aywaille, Liège, Belgium.

Nellie was a socialist and feminist who argued for equal opportunities for women, sex education and birth control. In Belgium, Nellie became an active socialist feminist. In 1892, she was chosen as the president of the Union pour la Solidarité des Femmes à Bruxelles (Union for Women's Solidarity in Brussels)'s president. In 1893, she co-founded the Hollandsch-Vlaamsche Vrouwenbond (Union of Dutch and Flemish women). She continued to work with feminist and, for a while, socialist organizations. Beginning in 1895, she wrote books for children. Nellie broke away from the socialist movement and joined The Salvation Army, which created a schism between her and her husband and other socialists. Van Kol and Nellie separated in 1919, and he lived with Otawa Tomi, a journalist from Japan, in Aywaille.

== Politics ==
Van Kol's interest in socialism grew throughout his school years and into adulthood. He worked on a study of how much it costs for workers to support a family of six and volunteered in workers' community houses, as prescribed by Charles Fourier. He got to know Karl Marx's family when he was their guide and interpreter at the Congress of the International at The Hague in September 1872. He met other noted socialists at the Congress. He wrote in socialist publications under the pseudonym Rienzi, an opera based upon Cola di Rienzo, an Italian politician from the 14th century and he wrote under his name for books like Christendom en socialisme (1881) and Wages as it is, and as it should be (1888-1889). He had several perspectives about socialism, scientific, utopian idealist, and emotional when acquiring examples of downtrodden workers.

Henri van Kol worked in the East Indies, and became the first socialist there. In 1876, he joined the First International. Van Kol was a member of the Social Democratic League (Sociaal Democratische Bond, SDB), a Dutch socialist political party, and broke away from the party to co-found the Social Democratic Workers' Party in 1894. In 1897, van Kol was elected to the House of Representatives in the district of Enschede. The family moved to Princenhage, and van Kol was often in The Hague. He made political trips within the Netherlands and to the East Indies in 1901 and 1902. He met and supported Kartini in her quest to earn a scholarship to train to become a teacher in Indonesia. Van Kohl was a member of parliament until 1909.

== Engineer ==
Van Kol worked as a hydraulic engineer in Java beginning in 1876. He worked initially at Sitoebondo in East Java. He also worked at the Waterstaat.

== Coffee plantation ==
In 1887, Ferdinand Domela Nieuwenhuis loaned van Kol money to buy the Cayumas coffee plantation with Nieuwenhuis, which brought in enough money for the van Kols to retire to Europe. He also donated much of his earnings to the Dutch labor movement. Ironically, the plantation employed poor people, having argued that 'the poor Javanese people' should not be exploited at The Hague. Like Nieuwenhuis, van Kol did not share that he owned the coffee plantation. A Christian family oversaw the plantation, which had a school and church, and established Sunday as a day of rest. Nieuwenhuis and van Kol's friendship suffered after arguing about dividend payments and differences of opinion about socialism.

== Uit Onze Koloniën ==
In 1903, Van Kol published the book Uit Onze Koloniën (From Our Colonies) and illustrated it with photographs he took while researching the Dutch colony in 1902. The book expressed a patriarchal view of the Indonesian people, stating, "We must lead this people lovingly, augment the riches of the country as benevolent caretakers, and increase the wealth of its inhabitants. In this magnificent country we have to support these good people when they stumble in their suffering path to the Sublime!" His descriptions of the indigenous people of Indonesia, though, could be crude with discrediting racial stereotypes.

== Death ==
Kol died in Aywaille, Belgium on 22 August 1925. His body was cremated at Westerveld.

== Publications ==
Translated titles:

- Christendom en socialisme (1881)
- Wages as it is, and as it should be (1888-1889)
- 'The International Socialist Congress of Workers at Zurich' in: The Social Guide, 1893, 423-440
- 'Our political struggle. Unfair criticism' in: De Sociale Gids, 1894, 139-143, 145-159, 241-249
- Women of the French Revolution (Amsterdam 1901)
- Uit Onze Koloniën (From Our Colonies) (1903)
- 'From the old box (1870-1872)' in: After ten years. Memorial to the tenth anniversary of the Social Democratic Labor Party (Amsterdam 1904) 164-166
- The Dutch East Indies in the States General from 1897 to 1909. A contribution to the history of colonial politics in the Netherlands (The Hague 1911)
- 'The struggle of the SDAP in the colonial field' in: Memorial book on the occasion of the twenty-fifth anniversary of the Social Democratic Workers' Party in the Netherlands (Amsterdam 1919) 89-95
- The struggle of the SDAP in Colonial Area (Amsterdam 1920)
- 'Childhood Memories' in: Weekend Illustrated Weekly, 19 September 1924, 302-305
