= Plan of Labour =

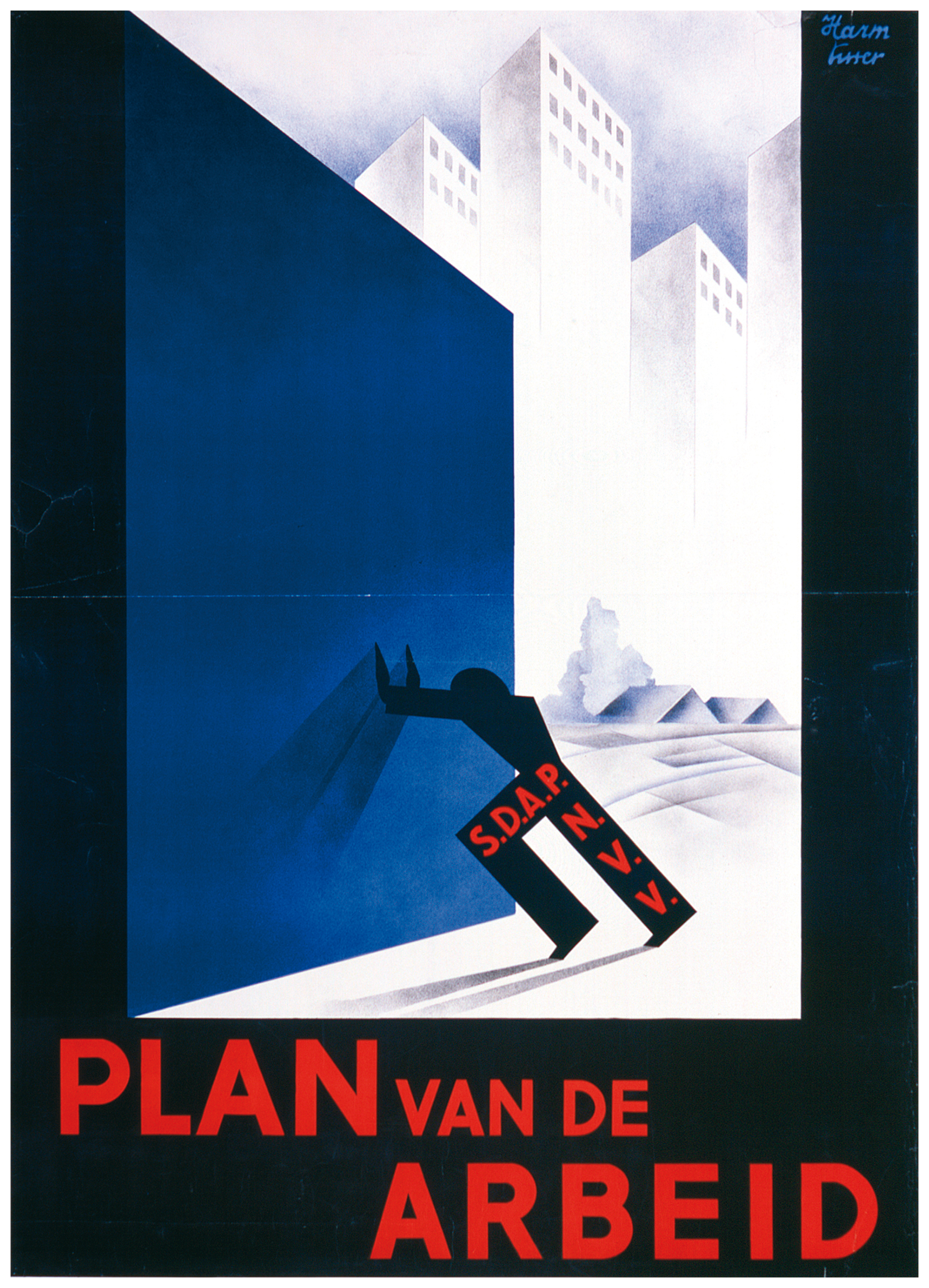
Promotional poster of the Plan of Labour

The Plan of Labour (Dutch: Plan van de Arbeid) was a proposed economic programme formulated by the Social Democratic Workers' Party (SDAP) and Dutch Confederation of Trade Unions (NVV) in 1935. The plan was formulated to respond to the economic malaise caused by the Great Depression. The plan was largely written by the Dutch economists Hein Vos and Jan Tinbergen, the latter becoming the first laureate of the Nobel Prize in Economics.

== History ==
When the Great Depression started to affect the Netherlands in 1931, the Dutch government, consisting of confessional and liberal parties, responded with austerity, whilst maintaining the value of the Dutch guilder at the gold standard. Although Dutch socialists had hailed the Great Depression as the start of the end of capitalism and thus believed it necessary to let it run its course, the SDAP realised it was their constituency, the working class, who were most harshly affected by the Depression and the government's policies. This change in policy towards the Depression came following the loss of two seats in the 1933 general election to the extreme-left Stalinist CPH and Trotskyist RSP, which was blamed on the SDAP's inactive policy towards the Depression. Thus, at the SDAP party congress in 1934, a plan commission was established to provide a socialist response to the Depression.

== The Plan ==
The Plan of Labour had two aims: to end economic stagnation and to fundamentally change the economic system. To achieve the first aim, Vos and Tinbergen argued for the investment of 200 million guilders in public works, which would employ nearly 200,000 workers, thereby, relying on Keynesian economic idea of a multiplier, to increase working-class purchasing power and reinvigorate the Dutch economy. To achieve the second aim, the Plan of Labour envisaged a General Economic Council in which businesses, workers and the government could coordinate the economy through rationalisation, industrialisation and investment. Thus the Plan of Labour was the rejection of Marxist orthodoxy of passive opposition during the end crisis of capitalism, providing a template for the SDAP to seek government responsibility.

== Aftermath ==
At the 1937 general election, in which the SDAP campaigned with the slogan Het moet, het kan! Op voor het Plan! ("It's necessary, it's possible! For the Plan!"), the SDAP and its progressive-Protestant ally the CDU won two seats from the extreme-left, reversing the defeat of 1933. However, with only 25 out of 100 seats, the centre-left did not enter government to implement the plan. Nevertheless, following the Second World War, the Labour Party (PvdA), the catch-all-successor of the SDAP and CDU, implemented large parts of the plan, most notably in the fields of agriculture and economic coordination, the latter with the establishment of the Social and Economic Council (SER), which was based on the aforementioned General Economic Council.

== Sources ==
- Abma, R. (1977-01-01). "Het Plan van de arbeid en de SDAP". BMGN: Low Countries Historical Review. 92 (1): 37–68. doi:10.18352/bmgn-lchr.1968. ISSN 2211-2898.
