= Social Democratic Workers' Party (Netherlands) =

Former political party in the Netherlands

Social Democratic Workers' Party Sociaal-Democratische Arbeiderspartij
- Abbreviation: SDAP
- Leader: Pieter Jelles Troelstra (1893–1925); Johan Willem Albarda (1925–1940)
- Founded: 26 August 1894
- Dissolved: 9 February 1946
- Split from: Social Democratic League
- Merged into: Labour Party
- Newspaper: Het Volk
- Youth wing: Arbeiders Jeugd Centrale
- Membership (1939): 82,415
- Ideology: Socialism; Marxism; Reformism; Republicanism
- Political position: Centre-left to left-wing
- International affiliation: Second International (1894–1914); Labour and Socialist International (1923–1940)
- Colours: Red

The Social Democratic Workers' Party (Dutch: Sociaal-Democratische Arbeiderspartij, SDAP) was a socialist political party in the Netherlands existing from 1894 to 1946. Originating from a split in the prior Social Democratic League, the party was a predecessor of the social democratic Labour Party.

== History ==
=== 1893–1904 ===
The SDAP was founded by members of the Social Democratic League (SDB) after a conflict between anarchist and reformist factions. During the SDB party conference of 1893 in Groningen, a majority voted to stop participating in the elections. They were afraid that the parliamentary work would drift the socialists away from what socialism was really about. A minority of members led by Pieter Jelles Troelstra tried to prevent this, and later left the party in order to found a new party. The foundation of a new party was controversial within the socialist movement, because Troelstra was seen as a bourgeois force who had destroyed the unity of the SDB and the socialist movement. When the anarchist elements began to take full control of the SDB, important regional social democratic figures joined the group around Troelstra. Together they formed a group called "the twelve apostles". The twelve apostles nearly all came from the provinces of Friesland and Groningen or from large cities like Amsterdam and Rotterdam, and most were intellectual-type men like teachers, vicars or lawyers. That is why SDB members and other socialists mockingly called the SDAP not a workers' party but a teachers' (Dutch: Schoolmeesters), vicars (Dutch: Dominees) and lawyers (Dutch: Advocaten) party still forming the acronym SDAP.

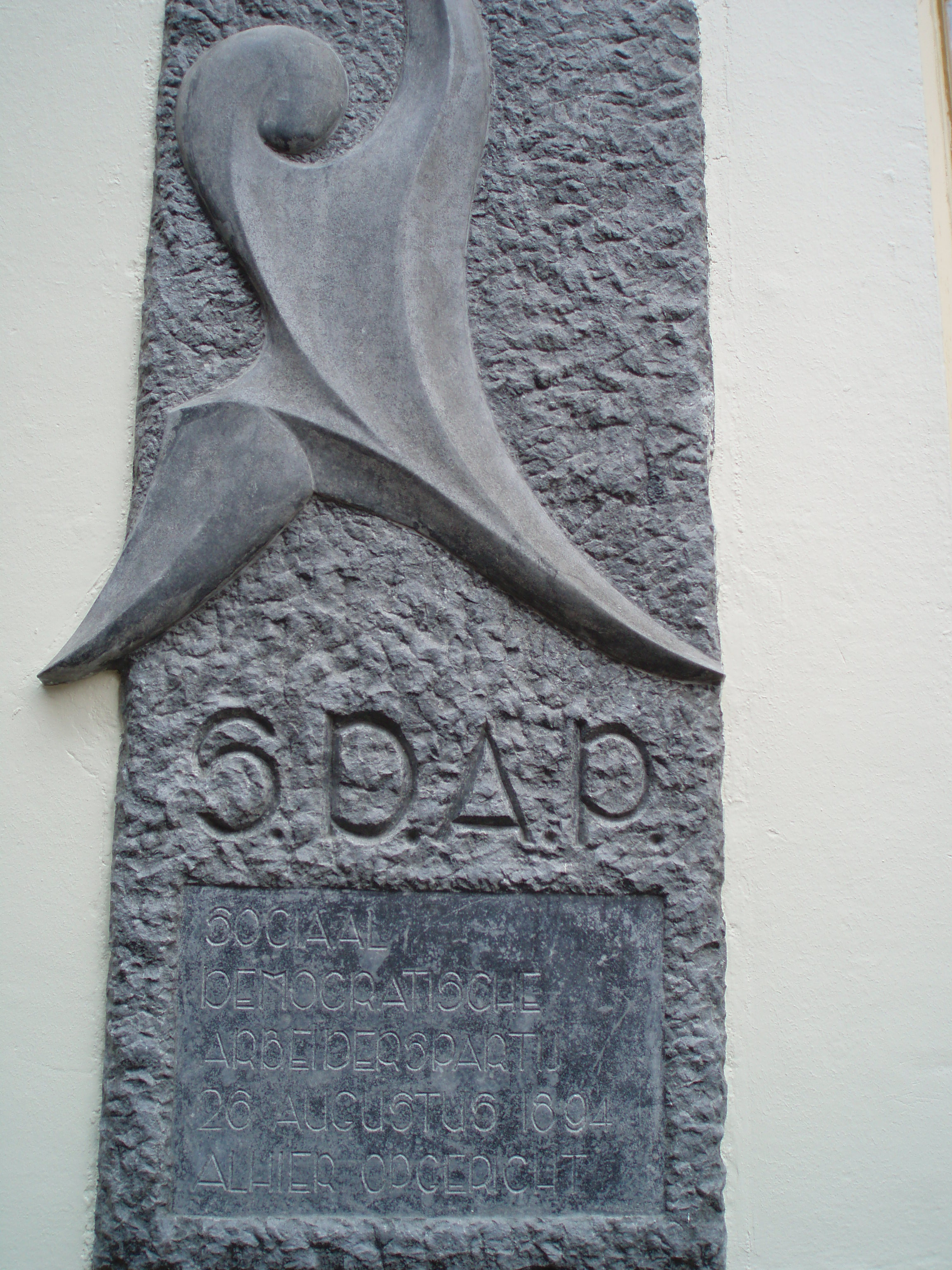
A plaque in Zwolle commemorating the founding of the SDAP

A political poster of the SDAP. It reads: "The Reds call, strengthen the SDAP".

The party was founded in Zwolle in 1894. The party programme was a literal translation of the Erfurt Program of the Social Democratic Party of Germany (SPD). Both parties believed in an imminent revolution which would make an end to suffering and inequality between classes and between men and women. The parliamentary work was only seen as a means to help the workers before the revolution would set off.

In its first years, the SDAP was a small party, searching for the best way to organise itself. It received a lot of financial and organisational support from the German SPD. In 1894, the International recognised the SDAP as the labour party. The SDAP was open for other socialist organisations, such as trade unions to associate themselves with the party.

In 1896, Cornélie Huygens became the first female member of the SDAP, and the first woman in the Netherlands to be a member of a political party. She was known as the "Red Lady".

In the 1897 general election, the party won its first two seats in the House of Representatives. Pieter Jelles Troelstra, a controversial person in the party, won the seat of Tietsjerksteradeel in Friesland and became chairman of the parliamentary party. In parliament the SDAP supported the social legislation of the Liberal majority cabinet, led by Nicolaas Pierson. The core of the cabinet was formed by the Liberal Union. During this period the party became the major socialist party of the Netherlands, attracting famous writers and poets like Herman Gorter, Henriette Roland Holst and Herman Heijermans, and the journalist Pieter Lodewijk Tak.

In 1900, party leader Troelstra visited Berlin and received a considerable sum of money, with which the party founded its own daily newspaper, called Het Volk, Dagblad voor de Arbeiderspartij ("The People, Paper for the Workers' Party"). In the same year the remainder of the SDB, which had been renamed Socialist League, joined the SDAP.

In the 1901 general election, the SDAP performed particularly well; it tripled its seats to six, the Liberal cabinet which the socialists supported lost its majority. The Coalition cabinet, composed of the Protestant Anti-Revolutionary Party and the Catholic General League, ignored the Socialists. After the election victory the party's power in the socialist pillar began to rise. In a massive reorganisation, the associated socialist organisations had to integrate with the party's branches.

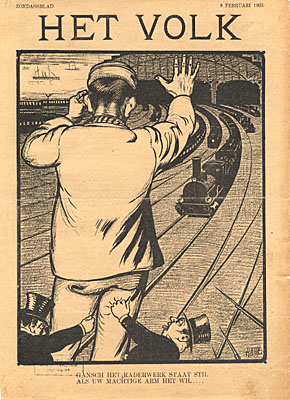
A famous cartoon by Albert Hahn in the socialist paper Het Volk. It reads: "The whole machinery stops, if your mighty hand wills it so".

=== 1903–1919 ===
In January 1903, a large strike broke out in the docking sector, out of solidarity, other sectors like the railway sector went on strike as well. The employers responded by firing the strikers. Years of suppression of the socialist movement and trade unions led to a huge revolt. The strikers demanded the re-employment of fired strikers, payment of wages for the striking days and the recognition of trade unions. The surprised directors of the railway companies accepted the demands. Meanwhile, the confessional cabinet led by Kuyper wanted to end the strike by posing harsh penalties against the strikers, because the strike struck vital industries.

Initially, the SDAP supported the strike, hoping it would spark a socialist revolution. But in reaction to the government legislation, moderate party members, including Troelstra, turned against the strikes. This led to a controversy between orthodox Marxists and moderate revisionists.

The strike ended the cooperation of socialist unions with confessional unions and the social democratic SDAP and anarchists of other organisations. The strike however did not only lead to breaches. The trade unions were prepared to unite and work together with the SDAP. The Dutch Confederation of Trade Unions (NVV) was founded in 1905 by Henri Polak.

After the railway strike, the conflict between revisionists and orthodox Marxists intensified both within the SDAP and internationally. In 1903 Troelstra lost control of Het Volk to the orthodox faction. In 1904, the orthodox faction had another victory, when revisionism was forbidden by the conference of the International in Amsterdam.

On the eve of the 1905 general election, the revisionists won a crucial victory. The party decided to support liberal candidates who were in favour of universal suffrage. The party gained one seat, meaning it held seven seats, and supported the liberal minority De Meester cabinet.

Many members of the SDAP were irritated by the behaviour of the orthodox Marxists who were continuously denouncing moderates. Troelstra openly attacked the orthodox Marxists and the party congress in a formal resolution declared to oppose all labelling opportunists and revisionists. The orthodox Marxist chairman Pieter Lodewijk Tak resigned and was succeeded by Willem Vliegen. Tak also lost control of Het Volk to Vliegen.

In 1907, a group of orthodox Marxists around David Wijnkoop founded the magazine De Tribune, which attacked the revisionist leadership of the SDAP. Troelstra and other leaders removed him and his associates from the party ranks in 1909. Wijnkoop founded the orthodox Marxist Social Democratic Party (SDP) the same year. The SDP later became the Communist Party of Holland. This was one of the first splits within the European labour movement.

In the 1909 general election, the SDAP held on to its seven seats, but their liberal allies lost many seats to the Coalition parties, who won a majority of sixty seats. In the knowledge that they could not accomplish anything in parliament, the SDAP focused on the extra-parliamentary movement for universal suffrage, for both men and women, regardless of class.

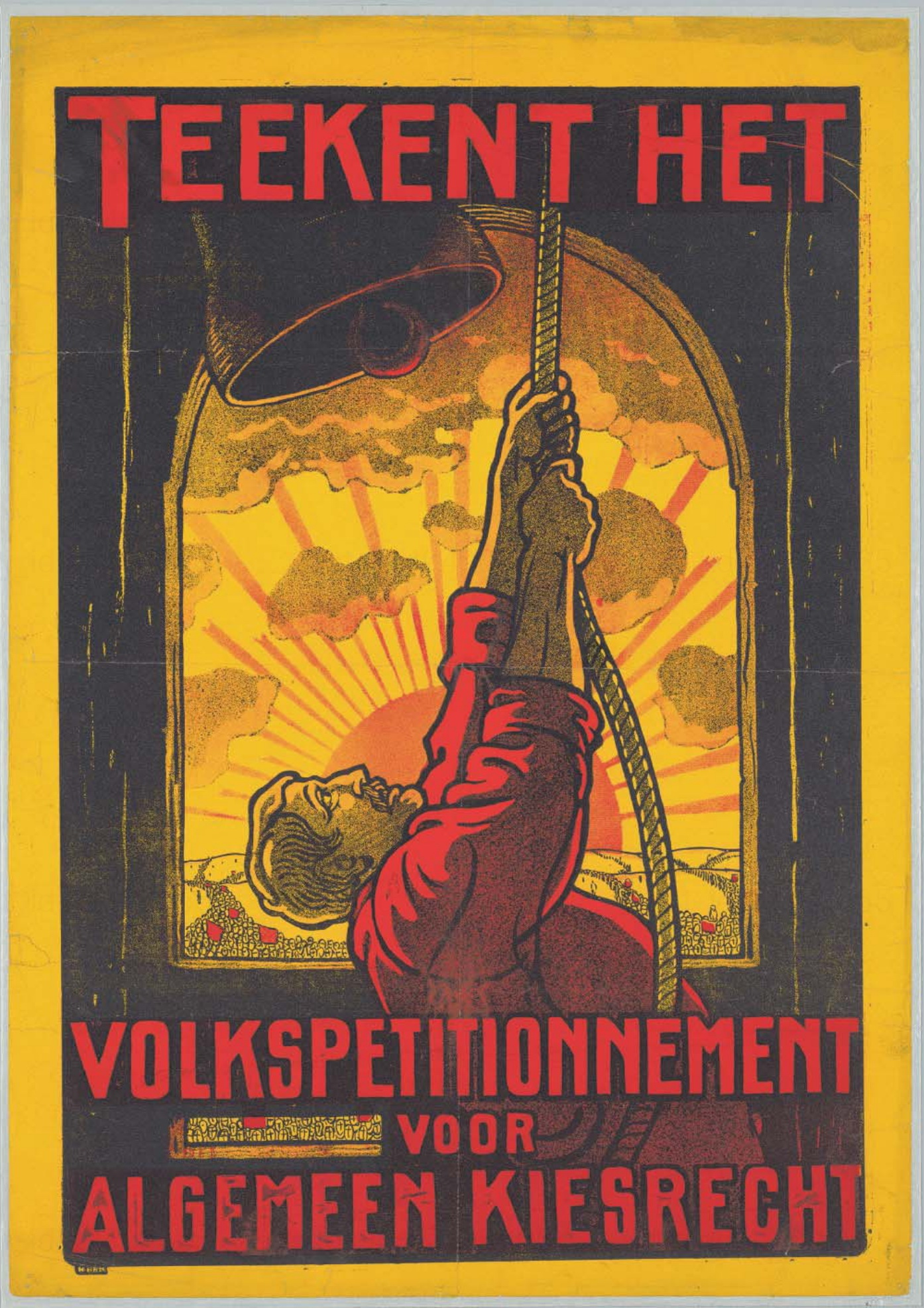
A political poster of the SDAP by Albert Hahn. It reads: "Sign the People's Petition for Universal Suffrage".

The party's original strategy was to organise mass strikes for universal suffrage. But the socialist union NVV feared reprisals from employers, so the SDAP decided to start a petition. In a mass demonstration in The Hague on Prinsjesdag the petition was presented to parliament. The SDAP called it Roode Dinsdag ("Red Tuesday"). The demonstration led to considerable controversy, when Queen Wilhelmina decided not to attend the Prinsjesdag ceremonies. For the 1912 Prinsjesdag the Red Tuesday was forbidden.

During this time, the women's movement began to influence the party. Women were deprived of political influence in the party, and the party leadership was split over the issue. Socialist women organisations began to flourish because of the struggle for universal suffrage. The SDAP founded a women's section, called Samen Sterk (Together Strong). Samen Sterk tried to found trade unions for female employees, starting with house maids. This caused considerable controversy in bourgeoisie circles.

In the 1913 general election, the SDAP more than doubled its seats to 15. As a serious force in parliament, the SDAP was asked to participate in government by the liberal formateur, and was offered three ministerial posts. The SDAP, even the reformist Troelstra, refused government participation, because the party acknowledged one of its major ideals, national disarmament, could not be realised. Instead of an unstable minority government, an extra-parliamentary cabinet was formed, comprising liberal and non-partisan ministers. The cabinet intended to realise socialist demands, like universal suffrage, the state pension and the eight-hour working day.

After the 1913 municipal elections, however, the SDAP did accept government responsibility in Zaandam and Amsterdam, forming municipal executives with the liberals.

After World War I had broken out, the SDAP supported the Dutch policy of armed neutrality. This support was welcomed by the leaders of the other parties but not by many SDAP members. In 1915, a special conference declared that the SDAP only supported the government temporarily and the support could be withdrawn, thus preventing another party-wide conflict.

During the war, the Allies blockaded the Dutch ports, which in turn led to an enormous lack of food; riots broke out in the major cities. The SDAP supported the government actions against these riots. Many of the protesters were furious about the SDAP and changed allegiance to the Social Democratic Party.

Meanwhile, the political system was in revision. A constitutional reform enabling universal suffrage was prepared by the liberal cabinet. In order to realise this change a two-thirds majority was necessary. This practically meant that all major parties, including the Coalition parties needed to agree with the change. The Coalition parties would consent to the change, but only if confessional schools would be granted finances equal to the public schools and if universal suffrage was not extended to women.

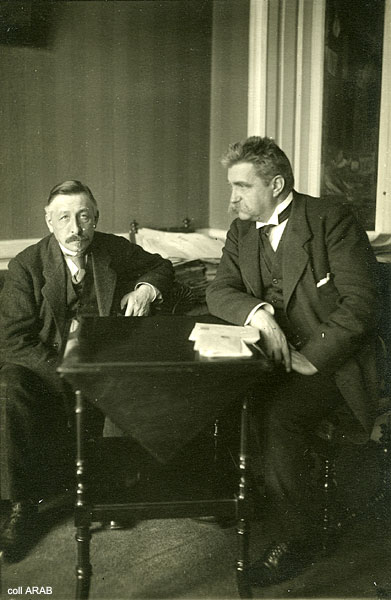
SDAP leader Pieter Jelles Troelstra in 1917 (on the left together with Hjalmar Branting)

The SDAP was especially critical of the second demand. On 17 September 1916, it organised a mass rally with 40,000 demonstrators, demanding female suffrage. In the end, however, the party consented with the changes the confessional parties demanded. With some changes, women were granted the right to be elected and women's suffrage was deconstitutionalised, meaning that only a normal majority was necessary to implement the change. In 1919, the left-liberal Henri Marchant initiated a bill to implement female suffrage, and in 1922 the first election with real universal suffrage was held.

In 1918, the first general election with universal suffrage and proportional representation was held. The SDAP won 22 of the 100 seats. One of these seats was taken by Suze Groeneweg, the first woman elected to parliament. Four seats were won by other left-wing parties, including the communists. The confessional parties however won a majority.

In November 1918, revolution broke out in Germany. SDAP leader Troelstra thought that the Netherlands was ready for revolution as well. In a speech in parliament he demanded the resignation of the government, because he expected the army and the police to support the revolution. The government did not resign. Instead, it prevented revolution from spreading. In doing so they were supported by most of the Dutch population. This incident is called "Troelstra's mistake" (Dutch: Troelstra's vergissing). Many SDAP members were displeased with Troelstra. He politically survived the 1919 party congress, though only narrowly.

Troelstra's mistake, the SDAP's reluctance to form a socialist/liberal government in 1913 and the electoral strength of the confessional parties prevented the SDAP's participation in government until 1939.

The SDAP won in the 1919 municipal elections, and socialist-supported municipal executives were formed in many cities.

In 1919, many socialist demands (universal suffrage, the eight hour workday and state pensions) were implemented. The party began to shift their focus away from the revolution and towards the direct improvement of the position of the working class.

A political poster of the SDAP. It reads: "One struggle, one goal, one party; join the SDAP".

=== 1919–1946 ===
Between 1919 and 1939, the SDAP got increasingly more seats but were kept out of government by a confessional majority; in 1926, Roman Catholic State Party leader, Wiel Nolens said that the confessionals would only govern with the socialists in a case of extreme necessity.

During the 1930s, the SDAP began to moderate its policies. It removed the demand of national disarmament in 1934, and became less republican, for instance sending a telegram with felicitations to Queen Wilhelmina in 1938 after her daughter, princess Juliana, gave birth to princess Beatrix. During the crisis the party proposed several plans for economic reform. In 1935 the SDAP published the Plan of Labour, which included plans to increase employment, nationalise vital industry and implement a system of unemployment benefits. The confessional-liberal government rejected the socialist proposals for economic reform. After 1936, however, it changed its course, giving into socialist demands by devaluating the guilder and allowing the national debt to rise in order to increase employment.

In reaction to this moderate course, a group of orthodox Marxist members, led by Jacques de Kadt, left the party to form the Independent Socialist Party. After an unsuccessful merger with the (Trotskyist) Revolutionary Socialist Party, many of the 3,000 split members returned.

This course of moderation was suddenly interrupted by the incidents surrounding the mutiny on the cruiser De Zeven Provinciën. During the mutiny, the political leadership of the SDAP announced that, although they did not support it, they could understand the motives behind the mutiny. Because of this incident the government temporarily forbade soldiers to be a member of the SDAP.

In 1939, at the dawn of World War II, prominent SDAP members were asked to participate in a national coalition, led by Protestant politician De Geer; the dawning war was the extreme necessity that allowed the SDAP to enter government. After the Netherlands was invaded by the Germans this government became the Dutch government-in-exile, in London. The SDAP first supplied two ministers (Albeda and Jan van de Tempel) and in 1944 they were joined by Jaap Burger. The SDAP was banned in 1940 by the occupying force. Many SDAP members were involved in resistance work during the war.

After World War II, there was a widespread sentiment in the Netherlands that the political system should be changed. This was called the Breakthrough. In order to force this breakthrough the SDAP merged with the left-liberal Free-thinking Democratic League (VDB) and the Christian-socialist Christian Democratic Union (CDU) to form a new party: the Labour Party. They were joined by individuals from the Protestant Christian Historical Union (CHU) and Anti-Revolutionary Party (ARP) and members of the Catholic resistance movement.

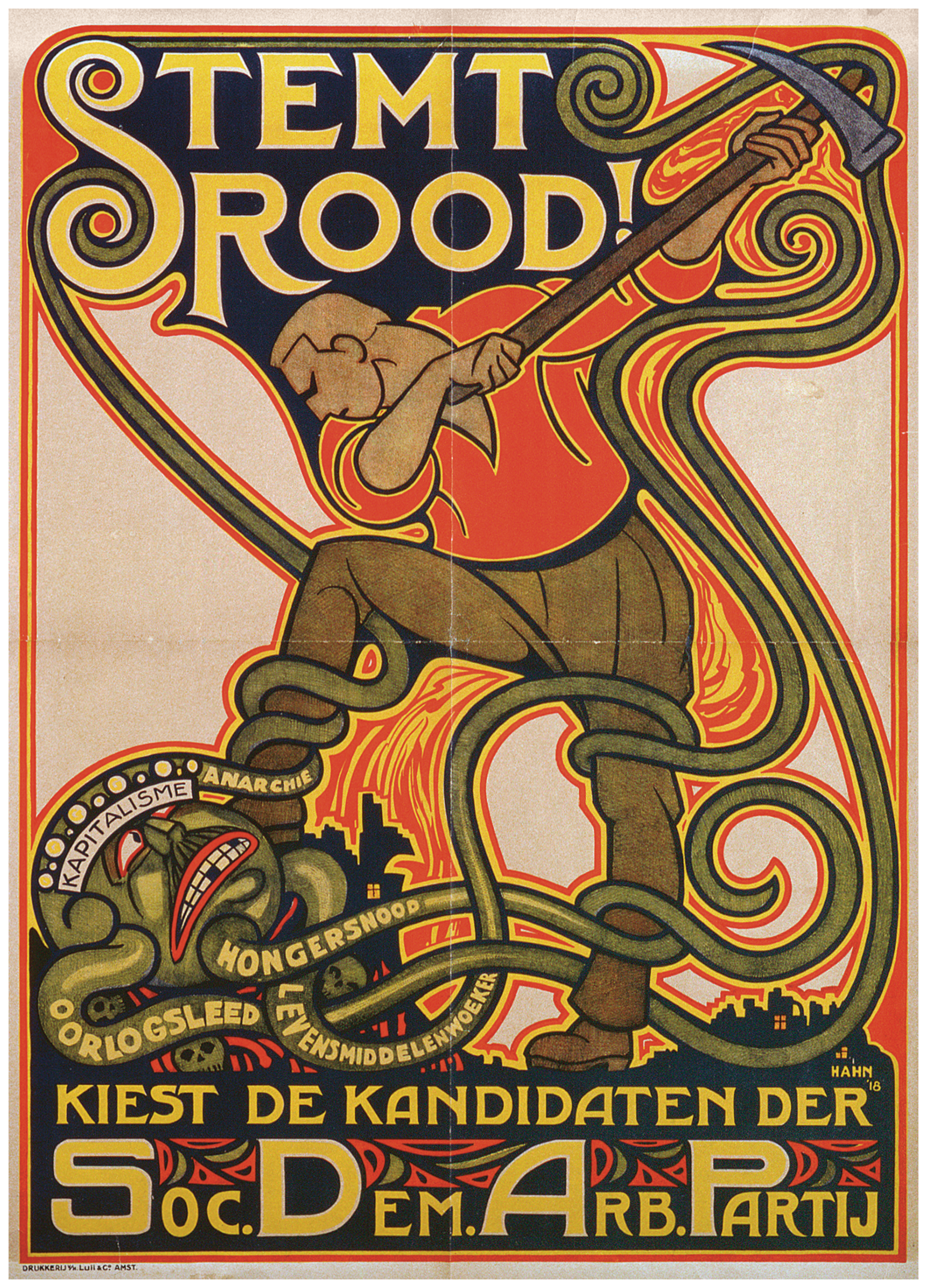
A political poster of the SDAP by Albert Hahn. It reads: "Vote Red! Vote for one of the candidates of the SDAP"; it depicts a socialist worker killing the octopus capitalism with its tentacles war, anarchism, famine and shortage.

== Ideology and issues ==
When it was founded in 1897 the SDAP was a socialist party, which strove for a socialist revolution. The party wanted to nationalise the means of production and build a system of social security. It was a staunch proponent of universal suffrage. Through time the party became more moderate. In 1939, the party was a democratic socialist party, which wanted to improve the situation of Dutch workers through parliament.

The parties main issues were the 5 k's the party opposed:

1. Capital (Dutch: Kapitaal): the party opposed the rule of capital, and wanted to create a socialist society.
2. Church (Dutch: Kerk): the party opposed the control the church had over large parts of society.
3. King (Dutch: Koning): the party opposed the monarchy and wanted to transform the Netherlands into a republic.
4. Barracks (Dutch: Kazerne): the party wanted to disarm the Dutch army. The party opposed militarism and nationalism. After the rise of the German Nazi Party the SDAP began to agitate for a people's army.
5. Pubs (Dutch: Kroeg): the party thought that alcoholism was one of the greatest foes of the working class.

== Electoral results ==
=== House of Representatives ===
Election	Leader	Votes	%	Seats	+/–	Government
1897	Pieter Jelles Troelstra	12,312	3.0	2 / 100	▲2	Confidence and supply
1901	Pieter Jelles Troelstra	36,981	9.5	6 / 100	▲4	In opposition
1905	Pieter Jelles Troelstra	65,561	11.2	6 / 100	Steady	Confidence and supply
1909	Pieter Jelles Troelstra	82,855	13.9	7 / 100	▲1	In opposition
1913	Pieter Jelles Troelstra	142,185	18.5	17 / 100	▲10	Confidence and supply
1917	Pieter Jelles Troelstra	41,775	18.7	15 / 100	▼2	Confidence and supply
1918	Pieter Jelles Troelstra	296,145	22.0	22 / 100	▲7	In opposition
1922	Pieter Jelles Troelstra	567,769	19.4	20 / 100	▼2	In opposition
1925	Willem Albarda	706,689	22.9	24 / 100	▲4	In opposition
1929	Willem Albarda	804,714	23.8	24 / 100	Steady	In opposition
1933	Willem Albarda	798,632	21.5	22 / 100	▼2	In opposition
1937	Willem Albarda	890,661	21.9	23 / 100	▲1	In opposition

== Representation ==
This table shows the SDAP's results in elections to the House of Representatives, Senate and provincial councils, as well as the party's parliamentary leader, this post is normally taken by the party's leader. It also possible that the party leader is member of cabinet, if the SDAP was part of the governing coalition, the highest ranking minister is listed, supportive indicates that the SDAP did not supply any ministers, but was supportive of the legislation proposed by cabinet.

Year	HoR	S	SP	Parliamentary leader	Cabinet
1897	2	0	unknown	Pieter Jelles Troelstra	supports Pierson cabinet
1898	2	0	unknown	Pieter Jelles Troelstra	supports cabinet
1899	2	0	unknown	Pieter Jelles Troelstra	supports cabinet
1900	2	0	unknown	Pieter Jelles Troelstra	supports cabinet
1901	6	0	unknown	Pieter Jelles Troelstra	opposition
1902	6	0	unknown	Pieter Jelles Troelstra	opposition
1903	6	0	unknown	Pieter Jelles Troelstra	opposition
1904	6	0	unknown	Pieter Jelles Troelstra	opposition
1905	7	0	unknown	Pieter Jelles Troelstra	supports De Meester cabinet
1906	7	0	unknown	Pieter Jelles Troelstra	supports cabinet
1907	7	0	unknown	Pieter Jelles Troelstra	supports cabinet
1908	7	0	unknown	Pieter Jelles Troelstra	supports cabinet
1909	7	0	unknown	Pieter Jelles Troelstra	opposition
1910	7	0	unknown	Pieter Jelles Troelstra	opposition
1911	7	0	unknown	Pieter Jelles Troelstra	opposition
1912	7	0	unknown	Pieter Jelles Troelstra	opposition
1913	15	2	unknown	Pieter Jelles Troelstra	supports Cort van der Linden cabinet
1914	15	2	unknown	Pieter Jelles Troelstra	supports cabinet
1915	15	2	unknown	Pieter Jelles Troelstra	supports cabinet
1916	15	2	unknown	Pieter Jelles Troelstra	supports cabinet
1917	15	2	unknown	Pieter Jelles Troelstra	supports cabinet
1918	22	2	unknown	Pieter Jelles Troelstra	opposition
1919	22	3	117	Pieter Jelles Troelstra	opposition
1920	22	4	117	Pieter Jelles Troelstra	opposition
1921	22	4	117	Pieter Jelles Troelstra	opposition
1922	20	4	117	Pieter Jelles Troelstra	opposition
1923	20	11	107	Pieter Jelles Troelstra	opposition
1924	20	11	107	Pieter Jelles Troelstra	opposition
1925	24	11	107	Johan Willem Albarda	opposition
1926	24	11	107	Johan Willem Albarda	opposition
1927	24	11	120	Johan Willem Albarda	opposition
1928	24	11	120	Johan Willem Albarda	opposition
1929	24	11	120	Johan Willem Albarda	opposition
1930	24	11	120	Johan Willem Albarda	opposition
1931	24	11	127	Johan Willem Albarda	opposition
1932	24	11	127	Johan Willem Albarda	opposition
1933	22	11	127	Johan Willem Albarda	opposition
1934	22	11	127	Johan Willem Albarda	opposition
1935	22	11	126	Johan Willem Albarda	opposition
1936	22	11	126	Johan Willem Albarda	opposition
1937	23	12	126	Johan Willem Albarda	opposition
1938	23	12	126	Johan Willem Albarda	opposition
1939	23	12	124	Willem Drees	Johan Willem Albarda
1940	out of session				Johan Willem Albarda
1941	out of session				Johan Willem Albarda
1942	out of session				Johan Willem Albarda
1943	out of session				Johan Willem Albarda
1944	out of session				Johan Willem Albarda
1945	23	12	124	Willem Drees	Johan Willem Albarda

=== Founders ===
Founders, known as the 12 apostles: Frank van der Goes, Pieter Jelles Troelstra, Henri van Kol, Adriaan Gerhard, Helmig Jan van der Vegt, Louis Cohen, Jan Fortuijn, Willem Helsdingen, Henri Polak, Jan Schaper, Hendrik Spiekman, and Willem Vliegen.

=== Municipal and provincial government ===
Many SDAP members of parliament were also members of a provincial or municipal council. Since 1913 the SDAP had participated in the municipal government of Amsterdam. Several famous SDAP politicians, like Willem Drees had first built up a reputation in municipal government through initiating employment and housing programs. This tradition was called Wethouderssocialisme (Alderman Socialism) and was very important for the credibility of the post-war PvdA.

In 1919 the SDAP had 1162 members of municipal councils and 72 members of the municipal executive.

The figure below shows the SDAP's results in the 1927 provincial elections. In several provinces, the urban North Holland and South Holland especially, the party performed very well. In the Catholic and predominantly rural South, Limburg and North Brabant, the party had a marginal position. In the Protestant and rural North, especially Groningen and Friesland, the party also performed well.

Province	Seats in SP (1927)
Limburg	4
North Brabant	4
Zeeland	4
Utrecht	8
North Holland	21
South Holland	21
Gelderland	11
Overijssel	8
Drenthe	8
Friesland	14
Groningen	14

== Electorate ==
In the period 1897-1919, when voting rights were restricted the party mainly received support from educated workers and young members of the Intelligentsia (lawyers, teacher, vicars and engineers). The SDAP was mainly supported by atheists and latitudinarian protestants. When universal suffrage was granted in 1919 the SDAP began to expand to all layers of the population, drawing heavy support from the working class.

The party historically received strong support from the major cities, such as Amsterdam and Rotterdam, and the northern provinces of Groningen, Friesland and Drenthe and the industrial region Twente.

== Organisation ==
=== Organisational structure ===
The highest organ of the SDAP was the Congress, formed by delegates from the municipal branches. It convened once every year. It appointed the party board, decided the order of candidates on electoral lists for the Senate and House of Representatives and had the final say over the party program.

=== Membership ===
When the SDAP was founded in 1897 it has around 600 members organised in 25 municipal branches.

In 1919 the party had around 49,000 members in around 645 municipal branches.

In 1938 the party had around 88,000 members in around 650 municipal branches.

The party's membership throughout its existence is displayed in the chart below.

View source data.

=== International organisations ===
Between 1894 and 1914 the SDAP was member of the Second International, after World War I, it lost its international contacts.

The party was a member of the Labour and Socialist International between 1923 and 1940.

=== Pillarised organisations ===
The SDAP had strong links with other socialist organisations in the socialist pillar. It had strong links with the largest trade union NVV. Two important means of propaganda of the party were the social democratic broadcasting organisation VARA and the paper Het Vrije Volk. The youth organisation Arbeiders Jeugdcentrale (Workers' Youth Central, AJC) was a large youth organisation aligned with the SDAP, founded in 1918, with around 11,500 members in 1935. The women's association aligned with the SDAP was Samen Sterk (Together Strong) founded in 1912. The student's association aligned with the SDAP was the Social Democratic Students Club, (Sociaal-Democratische Studentenclub, SDSC). A Workers' Education Institute (Instituut voor Arbeiders Ontwikkeling IvAO) was set up in 1924 and a scientific bureau in 1935. But the SDAP also had close links with workers' recreational organisations like the League of Workers' Singing Association and the Dutch Workers' Sporting Association. The teetotalist movement also had close links with the SDAP.

=== Relationships to other parties ===
Between 1897 and 1919 the SDAP supported liberal politicians, who were in favour of universal suffrage, in some districts. Several liberal minority governments were supported by the socialists. These relations deteriorated after the SDAPs unwillingness to participate in socialist/liberal cabinet in 1913 and Troelstra's mistake (in 1918). Furthermore, universal suffrage, a goal which united the liberals and the socialists was granted in 1918.

The relations between the SDAP and the confessional parties was particularly bad. The confessional parties saw socialism as an atheist ideology. This prevented SDAP government participation until 1939. Following the 1919 election some Christian socialist parties entered parliament which advocated stronger cooperation between the SDAP and the confessional parties. These calls were ignored by the confessional parties.

The SDAP was in constant state of cold war with the communist party SDP, later CPH, split from the SDAP. In 1935 when Moscow decreed that Comintern parties should cooperate with social democratic parties, the relationship improved.

The SDAP also had good relations with the social liberal Free-minded Democratic League (VDB). However the VDB's participation in the economically conservative 1930s crisis cabinets deteriorated this relationship. It furthermore had good relations with the Christian socialist Christian Democratic Union.

== Additional sources consulted ==
- J. Perry, P.J. Knegtmans, D.F.J. Bosscher, F. Becker and P. Kalma (1994). Honderd jaar sociaal-democratie in Nederland 1894-1994. Amsterdam: Uitgeverij Bert Bakker.
- H. de Vos. (1976) Geschiedenis van het socialisme in Nederland, in het kader van zijn tijd, deel 1. Baarn: Het wereldvenster
