= General Labour Confederation of Belgium =

National trade union federation

The General Labour Confederation of Belgium (Dutch: Belgisch Vakverbond, BVV; French: Confédération Générale du Travail de Belgique, CGTB) was a socialist national trade union federation in Belgium active between 1937 and 1945, when it merged with two other labor unions to form the General Labour Federation of Belgium.

== History ==
The federation was established on 5 December 1937, as a replacement for the Trade Union Commission. It was more centralised than its predecessor, and was not formally linked with the Belgian Labour Party. By 1939, it had about 540,000 members, making it the largest trade union federation in the country.

After 1940, it briefly operated under the German occupation, with new leadership who disavowed class struggle, but was banned completely later in the year.

Much of the trade union movement took part in the Belgian Resistance. Some tried to operate underground, while some leaders formed the Belgian Trade Union Centre in London. On 29 April 1945, with the occupation ended, the BVV was officially merged with the communist Belgian Federation of Unity Syndicates and the Unified Trade Unions, to form the General Labour Federation of Belgium.

== Affiliates ==
Union	Flemish abbreviation	French abbreviation	Membership (1937)
Belgian Union of Tramway and Municipal Transport Workers	CBPT	BCTBAP	12,600
Belgian Typographical Federation	BTF	FTB	5,356
Belgian Union of Transport Workers	UTB	BTB	29,000
Central Union of Public Service Workers	COD		16,225
General Diamond Workers' Association of Belgium	ADB		12,602
General Union	CG	AC	120,732
General Union of Employees, Warehousemen, Technicians and Travelling Salesmen of Belgium	SETCa	BBTK	15,806
Leather Workers' Union			7,910
National Federation of Jewellery and Related Trades			438
National Food Federation	HORVAL	HORVAL	8,325
National Union of Civil Defence Staff			2,489
National Union of Rail, Post, Telegraph, Telephone, Marine and Aviation Workers	IJPTTZL	ChPTTMA	41,310
Tobacco Workers' Union			4,500
Socialist Union of Education Workers	CSOP		5,400
Union of Agents in North Belgium			3,732
Union of Agricultural Operations Staff			492
Union of Belgian Stoneworkers	COPB		20,830
Union of Belgian Textile Workers	COTB	TACB	65,204
Union of Bookworkers of Belgium	CSB		4,233
Union of Clothing Workers and Kindred Trades in Belgium	CKAVB	CVPS	3,349
Union of Doctors			120
Union of Hatters			600
Union of Merchant Navy Officers			900
Union of Mineworkers of Belgium	CSTMB	NCMB	46,701
Union of Socialist Journalists			100
Union of the Belgian Metal Industry	CMB	CMB	116,465

== Leadership ==
=== Presidents ===
1937: Edward De Vlamynck
1940: Joseph Bondas

=== General Secretaries ===
1937: Joseph Bondas
1939: Joseph Bondas and Jef Rens
1940: Jef Rens
