= Trade Union Commission =

Belgian trade union federation

The Trade Union Commission (Dutch: Syndikale Kommissie van België, SK; French: Commission syndicale de Belgique, CS) was a national trade union federation in Belgium.

== History ==
The federation was established on 11 April 1898, at a conference of the Belgian Workers' Party (BWP). It hoped to increase union membership, while linking unions with the BWP and the socialist movement. It initially focused on lobbying for legislation to improve working conditions, and encouraging affiliated unions to merge. From 1903, it published the Korrespondentieblad journal.

In its early years, the SK made some headway in obtaining compensation for workplace injuries, and a state pension. In 1902, it led a general strike in support of universal suffrage, a key policy of the BWP. However, the strike failed, and more than half the SK's membership then left. From 1905, the SK became increasingly independent of the BWP, firstly by removing the party's ability to nominate half of its executive, then from 1906 by admitting unions which did not themselves affiliate with the BWP. In 1913, the union led another general strike, and this proved more successful, ultimately leading to universal suffrage in 1919. Around this time, it also secured the right for state employees to join unions, and the abolition of a law which targeted radical trade unionists with lengthy prison sentences.

From 1921, the affiliated membership of the SK declined, as the country entered a long depression. The federation managed to obtain some further improvements in working conditions in the 1920s, and persuaded more of its affiliates to merge. The 1930s saw the economic situation worsen, and some gains were lost, but a major strike in 1936, led by the SK but backed by the General Confederation of Liberal Trade Unions of Belgium and the Confederation of Christian Trade Unions, obtained major gains including paid leave, a minimum wage, and a 40-hour working week for many workers.

In 1937, the SK decided that it needed to adopt a more centralised structure, and gain more independence from the BWP. As a result, at the end of the year, it reformed itself as the General Labour Confederation of Belgium.

== Affiliates ==
Union	Flemish abbreviation	French abbreviation	Membership (1920)
Association of Tailors' Cutters			118
Belgian Typographical Federation	BTF	FTB	4,858
Belgian Union of Tramway and Municipal Transport Workers	CBPT	BCTBAP	9,184
Belgian Union of Transport Workers	UTB	BTB	27,520
Central Union of Public Service Workers	COD		10,981
Federation of the Glove Industry			807
General Clerks' Union			10,250
General Diamond Workers' Association of Belgium	ADB		7,858
Leather Workers' Union			7,547
National Food Federation	HORVAL	HORVAL	8,250
National Union of Civil Defence Staff			2,117
National Union of Rail, Post, Telegraph, Telephone, Marine and Aviation Workers	IJPTTZL	ChPTTMA	90,013
National Federation of Jewellery and Related Trades			740
Socialist Union of Education Workers	CSOP		2,026
Tobacco Workers' Union			9,000
Union of Belgian Stoneworkers	COPB		25,300
Union of Belgian Textile Workers	COTB	TACB	52,152
Union of Bookbinders			1,987
Union of Clothing Workers and Kindred Trades in Belgium	CKAVB	CVPS	6,357
Union of Cobblers			1,303
Union of Construction and Wood			68,340
Union of Factory Workers			51,283
Union of Glass Warehouse Workers			1,050
Central Union of Belgian Glassworkers			8,959
Union of Hatters			958
Union of Lithographers			1,108
Union of Mineworkers of Belgium	CSTMB	NCMB	112,964
Union of Socialist Journalists			48
Union of the Belgian Metal Industry	CMB	CMB	139,413

== Leadership ==
=== Presidents ===
1911: Jules Solau
1930: Jean Baeck
1931: Edward De Vlaemynck

=== General secretaries ===
1921: Corneel Mertens
