= Brian Orrell =

Brian David Orrell OBE (born September 1948) is a former British trade union leader.

Born in Barrow-in-Furness, Orrell went to sea in 1965, training as an engineer with the Blue Funnel Line. He joined the Merchant Navy and Airline Officers Association (MNAOA), and from 1973 he worked full-time for the union as industrial officer of its Liverpool branch. While in this post, he studied with Ruskin College and then the Chelmer Institute Law School.

In 1989, Orrell was elected as assistant general secretary of National Union of Marine, Aviation and Shipping Transport Officers (NUMAST), the successor to the MNAOA, and then he became general secretary in 1993. He represented the union at the International Transport Workers' Federation, and chaired its seafarers' group from 2000, achieving new agreements on working conditions, hours or work, and identity documents.

Orrell negotiated an international merger, which led NUMAST to join the new Nautilus International in 2009. He stood down shortly before the merger took place. In 2007, he was made an Officer of the Order of the British Empire, and the following year, he was given the Lloyds List London Lifetime Achievement Award. He also served for several years on the General Council of the Trades Union Congress. After his retirement, he served as chair of Seafarers' Rights International.

Trade union offices
Preceded by John Newman	General Secretary of the National Union of Marine, Aviation and Shipping Transport Officers; 1993–2009	Succeeded by Mark Dickinson
Preceded by John Fay	Chair of the Seafarers' Section of the International Transport Workers' Federation; 2000–2010	Succeeded by David Heindel
