= Radio and Electronic Officers' Union =

Former trade union of the United Kingdom

- Predecessor: Association of Wireless Telegraphists; Cable and Telegraph Operators' Association,
- Merged into: National Union of Marine, Aviation and Shipping Transport Officers
- Founded: 1921
- Dissolved: 1985
- Headquarters: 4/6 Branfill Road, Upminster
- Location: United Kingdom
- Members: 4,500 (1922); 2,957 (1968)
- Publication: The Signal
- Affiliations: TUC, ITF, IFR, SJC

The Radio and Electronic Officers' Union (REOU) was a trade union representing radio operators on British civilian ships.

== History ==
The union was founded in 1921, when the Association of Wireless Telegraphists merged with the Cable and Telegraph Operators' Association, forming the Association of Wireless and Cable Telegraphists. The majority of early members worked for the Marconi Company, Siemens Brothers, or the Radio Communication Company.

The union was successful, and by 1922 it had about 4,500 members, and was a member of the Seafarers' Joint Council. It undertook a strike in 1922, which achieved agreement on a standard pay scale, and another in 1925 in opposition to a pay cut. However, it devoted much of its time to negotiating with the Engineering Employers' Federation.

In 1937, the union renamed itself as the Radio Officers' Union. It affiliated to the Trades Union Congress in 1936, the Officers' (Merchant Navy) Federation in 1940, and the National Maritime Board in 1941.

In 1967, the union lengthened its name to the Radio and Electronic Officers' Union, in light of it also admitting technicians. By this time, it had members in the Merchant Navy, and also on fishing vessels, oil rigs and related onshore industries.

The union merged with the Merchant Navy and Airline Officers' Association and the Mercantile Marine Service Association in 1985, forming the National Union of Marine, Aviation and Shipping Transport Officers.

== General Secretaries ==
1921: E. R. Tuck
1929: T. J. O'Donnell
1938: Harry J. Perkins
1949: Hugh O'Neill
1968: Kevin Murphy
