= Peter de Vries =

Peter, Pieter, or Piter de Vries may refer to:

- Peter De Vries (1910–1993), American editor and novelist
- Peter R. de Vries (1956–2021), Dutch crime reporter
- Pieter de Vries (1897–1975), Dutch trade union leader
- Piter De Vries, character from the 1965 science fiction novel Dune
