= Union of Bookworkers of Belgium =

Trade Union in Belgium

The Union of Bookworkers of Belgium (French: Centrale des travailleurs du livre de Belgique; Dutch: Centrale der Boekbewerkers van België, CBB) was a trade union representing printers and bookbinders in Belgium.

After World War I, the unions affiliated to the Trade Union Commission (SK) were increasingly able to achieve agreements which covered the entire printing industry. The SK persuaded the Central Union of Bookbinders and the Union of Lithographers to merge in 1924, although the Belgian Typographical Federation (FTB) refused to join.

The new union affiliated to the SK, with 4,421 members. This increased to 5,186 by the end of 1925, and then gradually declined. In 1937, it transferred from the SK to its successor, the General Labour Confederation of Belgium. During the Nazi occupation, it affiliated to the collaborationist Union of Manual and Spiritual Workers, but suffered the loss of most of its members.

At the start of 1945, the union joined with former members of the FTB, to form the Paper and Publishing Industry Union. From 1924 until 1935, the union's general secretary was Henri Berckmans.

== Presidents ==
1924: Jean Pladet
1924: Corneel Mertens
