= Van Uytven =

Van Uytven or van Uytven is a surname. Notable people with the surname include:

- Alfons Van Uytven (1920–2008), Belgian trade union leader
- Raymond van Uytven (1933–2018), Belgian medievalist
