= Dore Smets =

Belgian politician (1901–1976)

Isidore Albert Maria Smets (6 June 1901 – 31 May 1976) was a Belgian trade union leader and politician.

Born in Mechelen, Smets began working for the Union of Factory Workers when he was just sixteen years old, as secretary of its branch in his home town. In 1921, the union became part of the new General Union, and Smets was appointed as the new union's secretary in Lier. He also worked for the Union of Food and Hotel Workers, and for the local co-operative. He joined the Socialist Party, and served on Mechelen council from 1927 to 1932, then Lier council from 1933 to 1938.

Smets was appointed as deputy general secretary of his union in 1937, and general secretary in 1938. He fled to the United Kingdom during World War II, organising the Belgian trade unionist in exile in the country, and also broadcasting on behalf of the BBC. After the war, he returned to Belgium, winning election as president of the General Union in 1949.

From 1954 to 1961, and again from 1965 to 1968, Smets served as a co-opted member of the Senate. Through this, he served in the European Parliament, and was a vice-president in 1958. From 1960, he was the president of the International Federation of Building and Woodworkers, and he was also vice-president of the International Federation of Factory Workers. He retired in 1966, and died ten years later.

Trade union offices
Preceded by Paul Fassin	President of the General Union; 1949–1966	Succeeded by Emiel Janssens
Preceded by Richard Coppock	President of the International Federation of Building and Woodworkers; 1960–1966	Succeeded by James H. Mills
