= General Labour Federation of Belgium =

Belgian trade union federation

- Algemeen Belgisch Vakverbond; Fédération générale du travail de Belgique
- Abbreviation: ABVV-FGTB
- Predecessor: Belgian Trade Union Federation
- Founded: 29 April 1945; 81 years ago
- Headquarters: Brussels, Belgium
- Location: Belgium
- Members: 1.5 million (2019)
- Key people: Thierry Bodson, chairperson Miranda Ulens, secretary general
- Affiliations: ITUC, ETUC, TUAC
- Website: abvv.be

The General Labour Federation of Belgium (Flemish: Algemeen Belgisch Vakverbond, pronounced [ˈɑlɣəmeːn ˈbɛlɣis ˈfɑkfərˌbɔnt]; Walloon: Fédération générale du travail de Belgique, pronounced [fedeʁɑsjɔ̃ ʒeneʁal dy tʁavaj də bɛlʒik]; ABVV-FGTB) is a socialist national trade union federation in Belgium. It was founded in 1945. It is affiliated with the International Trade Union Confederation and has a membership of 1.5 million. With said membership the ABVV-FGTB is the second largest of the three major trade unions in Belgium, closely following the Confederation of Christian Trade Unions (ACV/CSC) which has 1.6 million members and dwarfing the General Confederation of Liberal Trade Unions of Belgium (ACLVB/CGSLB) which has approximately 300,000 members.

During the bulk of its history the ABVV-FGTB remained closely affiliated with the Belgian Socialist Party which was split in 1978 into separate social-democratic parties along linguistic lines which have subsequently become Vooruit and the Parti socialiste (PS). While remaining formally independent from any political party, the ABVV-FGTB noticed the increasing influence of the Marxist Workers' Party of Belgium amongst its active base during the 2010s.

== History ==
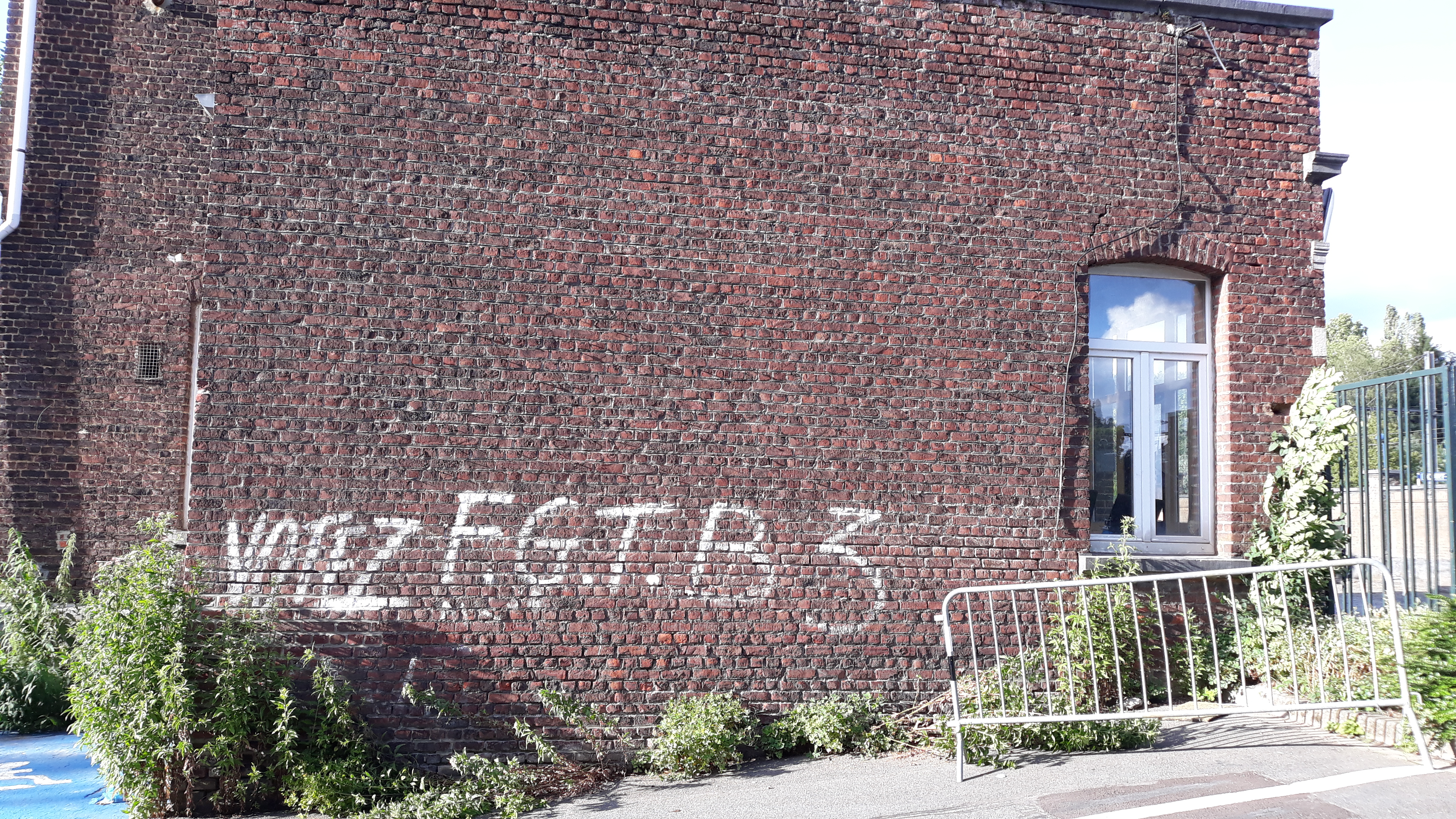
Graffiti in Court-Saint-Etienne during social elections at the local steel factory Usines Émile Henricot around 1983. "Vote FGTB Nr 3"

The first noteworthy historic date when talking about the history of the ABVV-FGTB is the founding of the Belgian Labour Party (BLP) in 1885. While several socialist organisations already existed beforehand this was the first time that the Belgian socialist movement was largely unified and laid the groundwork for the foundation of the ABVV-FGTB. In 1898 the Syndical Commission was erected within the framework of the BLP and in 1937 this Commission formally became independent from the socialist party, as the Belgian Trade Union Federation. Nonetheless strong ties between the socialist union and the socialist party were maintained until today. After the Second World War in 1945 this independent socialist union became the ABVV-FGTB we know today.

== Membership and Affiliates ==
In 2017 the ABVV-FGTB had a total of 1,517,968 members divided across its 7 affiliates. Thus Belgium's second largest labour union noticed a modest decline in membership of 17,340 compared to 2016. On the regional level 726,410 of the aforementioned membership comes from Flanders, 600,945 from Wallonia and 190,613 from Brussels.

Union	French abbreviation	Flemish abbreviation	Membership 2015	Membership 2016	Membership 2017
General Union	CG	AC	432,271	427,517	424,095
Association of Employees, Technicians and Managers	SETCa	BBTK	424,580	421,922	420,285
General Union of Public Services	CGSP	ACOD	311,795	309,046	303,062
Union of the Belgian Metal Industry	CMB	CMB	160,136	156,085	153,233
Food, Hospitality and Services Union	HORVAL	HORVAL	122,794	123,468	124,214
Belgian Union of Transport Workers	UTB	BTB	49,831	50,471	51,684
General Labour Federation of Belgium - Youth	FGTB - Jeunes	ABVV - Jongeren	43,509	46,799	41,395

=== Former affiliates ===
Union	French abbreviation	Flemish abbreviation	Founded	Reason no longer affiliated	Date
Belgian Union of Tramway and Municipal Transport Workers	CBPT	BCTBAP	1919	Merged into ACOD	1968
Food Production Van Sina	Vansina	Vansina	1951	Merged into HORVAL	1955
General Diamond Workers' Association of Belgium		ADB	1895	Merged into TVD	1994
Leather Workers' Union			1919	Merged into AC	1953
Paper and Publishing Industry Union	CLP	CBP	1944	Merged into BBTK and AC	1996
Textile-Clothing-Diamond Union	TVD	TKD	1994	Merged into AC	2014
Tobacco Workers' Union			1909	Merged into AC	1954
Union of Mineworkers of Belgium	CSTMB	NCMB	1889	Merged into AC	1994
Union of Belgian Stoneworkers	COPB		1889	Merged into AC	1965
Union of Belgian Textile Workers	COTB	TACB	1898	Merged into TVD	1994
Union of Clothing Workers and Kindred Trades in Belgium	CVPS	CKAVB	1908	Merged into TVD	1994

== Walloon movement ==
Through the foundation of the Mouvement populaire wallon during the Great Strike that took place in the Winter of 1960-1961, the Walloon working class now also demanded federalism as well as structural reforms. The leader of the Strike, André Renard was also a national leader of the General Labour Federation of Belgium. This whole process would come to be named Renardism.

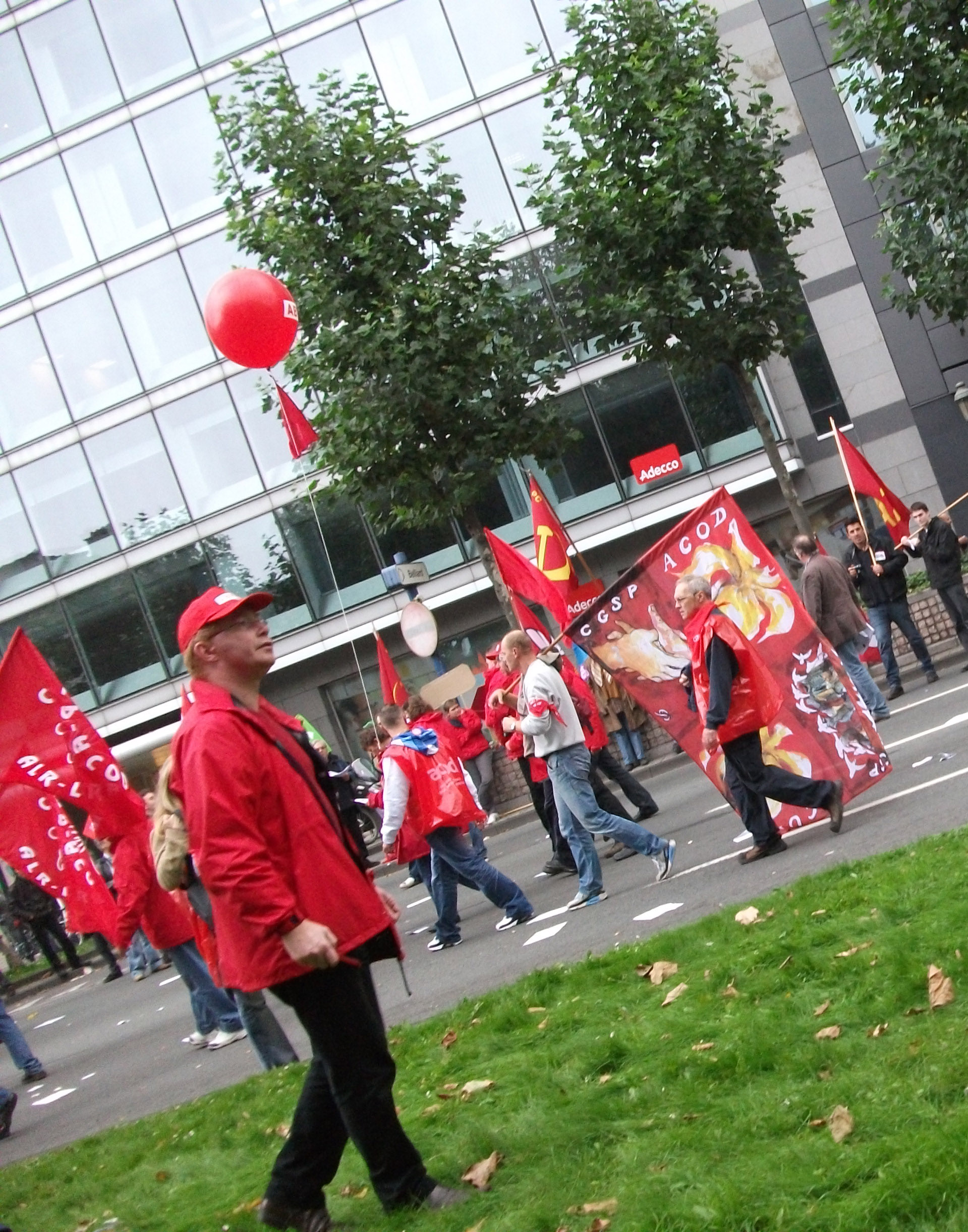
Protest against economic austerity in Brussels (29 September 2010)

== Leadership ==
=== General Secretaries ===
1945: Joseph Bondas
1947: Paul Finet
1952: Louis Major
1968: Georges Debunne
1982: Alfred Delourme
1987: Jean Gayetot
1989: Mia De Vits
2002: André Mordant
2004: Xavier Verboven
2006: Anne Demelenne
2014: Marc Goblet
2017: Robert Vertenueil
2018: Miranda Ulens

=== Presidents ===
1956: Roger Dekeyzer
1957: Willy Schugens
1958: Alfons Baeyens
1959: Hervé Brouhon
1960: Emiel Janssens
1961: Joseph Dedoyard
1963: Victor Thijs
1964: Oscar Leclercq
1965: Desiré Van Daele
1966: Louis Plumier
1967: Gust Wallaert
1968:
1982: André Vanden Broucke
1989: François Janssens
1995: Michel Nollet
2002: Mia De Vits
2004: André Mordant
2006: Rudy De Leeuw
2018: Robert Vertenueil
2020: Thierry Bodson

== See also ==
- Interrégionale wallonne de la FGTB

== Sources ==
- ICTUR; et al., eds. (2005). Trade Unions of the World (6th ed.). London, UK: John Harper Publishing. ISBN 0-9543811-5-7.
