= General Union =

General Union may refer to:

- General union, a type of trade union that does not limit its membership to workers in particular crafts or industries
- General Union (Belgium), a Belgian trade union
- General Union (Japan), a Japanese trade union
- Luis Fermín de Carvajal, Conde de la Unión (1752–1794), a Spanish general
