= Another Left =

Another Left (French: Une Autre Gauche, pronounced [yn otʁə ɡoʃ]) was an electoral initiative in Wallonia, Belgium. It was founded in 2006 by people disappointed by the austerity policies of the socialist and green parties and supported by most parties of the radical left.

== History ==
This attempt to build a new left-wing force in the French-speaking part of Belgium goes back to an appeal published on 22 February 2006 entitled "Another policy is possible, another policy is necessary". Trade union delegates of the company CSC Transcom had taken the initiative for the call. They were triggered by the so-called "generation pact", a law to reduce the pension insurance, which despite a general strike the Socialist Party (PS) and the green Ecolo had approved in parliament in 2005. The initiative was also joined by people who had opposed the adoption of the European Constitution by parliament.

The first meeting of the initiative took place on 11 March 2006. It was attended by left socialists and greens, representatives of the Communist Party (PC), the trotskyist Movement for a Socialist Alternative (LSP/MAS) and Socialist Workers Party (POS), Humanist Party (PH) and groups such as Unite Resistance and Against the Current.

On 28 October 2006, a joint conference with the Flemish Committee for Another Policy (CAP) took place in Brussels, attended by 650 people. But differences soon became apparent. While the CAP, which was perceived more publicly than the UAG because of the larger prominence of its founders, wanted to participate in the parliamentary elections in June 2007, the majority of the UAG gave priority to programmatic work. It was oriented towards the formation of an anti-capitalist party, in contrast to the CAP, which focused on anti-neoliberalism. These differences led to a break with the LSP/MAS in June 2006 which was influent inside the CAP.

After the LSP/MAS started to set up organizations of the CAP in the Walloon part of the country without consulting the UAG, and the management of the CAP did not stop it, there was a crisis in the UAG's relations with the CAP.

The UAG never took part in elections. It ceased activities around 2010.

It was an observer member of the European Left.
