= Paper and Publishing Industry Union =

The Paper and Publishing Industry Union (Dutch: Centrale der Boek- en Papiernijverheid, CBP; French: Centrale de l'industrie du Livre et du Papier, CLP) was a trade union representing workers in the graphical industries in Belgium.

The union was founded on 1 January 1945, when the Union of Bookworkers of Belgium came together with former members of the Belgian Typographical Federation and established a new organisation. It was then a founder constituent of the General Federation of Belgian Labour (ABVV).

While always a relatively small union, with a peak membership of 18,017 in 1975, for its first three decades, it was considered strong and highly successful. However, increased mechanisation and computerisation of the industry led to widespread job losses, and many remaining workers were placed on precarious freelance contracts.

By 1995, union membership was down to only 11,878, and while there was a consensus that it should merge into a larger union, there was disagreement over which one it should choose. The union's secretariat decided to merge it into the Association of Employees, Technicians and Managers, the amalgamation taking place on 1 January 1996, but the Flemish region instead joined the General Union. Soon afterwards, the majority of former union members in Brussels and Wallonia also transferred to the General Union.
