= Douglas Tennant =

British trade union leader

Charles Douglas Smith Tennant CBE (1906 – 19 November 1985) was a British trade union leader.

Tennant came to prominence in 1935, when he helped to found the Navigators' and Engineer Officers' Union (NEOU). This affiliated to the International Mercantile Marine Officers' Association (IMMOA). In 1940, the IMMOA evacuated to London, and Tennant was appointed as its acting general secretary, soon winning the post on a permanent basis. In 1943, he also became general secretary of the NEOU.

After the war, Tennant felt that officers in the merchant navy were better represented by the International Transport Workers' Federation, and so in 1948, the IMMOA transferred all its industrial functions to that body. Tennant became chair of its Seafarers' Section, and vice-chair of its Civil Aviation Section, while continuing to run a largely inactive IMMOA until its dissolution, in 1964.

In 1956, Tennant arranged for the Marine Engineers' Association to merge into the NEOU, which was then renamed as the Merchant Navy and Airline Officers' Association. He remained its general secretary until his retirement, in 1971.

Tennant was made a Commander of the Order of the British Empire in the 1952 New Year Honours.

Trade union offices
Preceded by Omer Becu	General Secretary of the International Mercantile Marine Officers' Association; 1940–1964	Federation dissolved
Preceded by William Harry Coombs	General Secretary of the Merchant Navy and Airline Officers' Association; 1943–1971	Succeeded by John Slater
