= Central Union of Transport Workers =

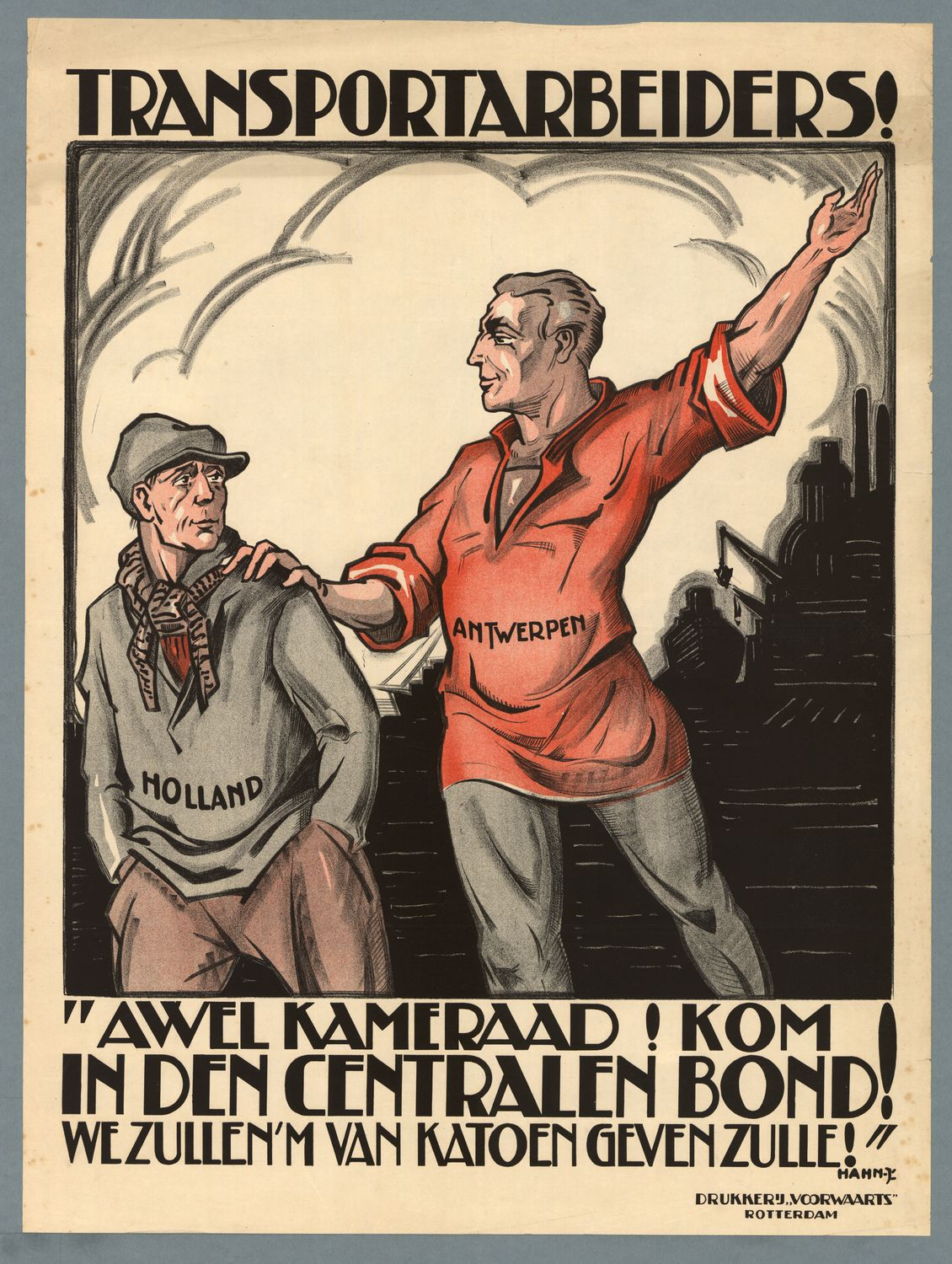
Poster calling on transportation workers to join "Centrale Bond", designed by Albert Hahn jr.

The Central Union of Transport Workers (Dutch: Centrale Bond van Transportarbeiders, CBT) was a trade union representing workers in the transport sector in the Netherlands.

The union was founded on 1 January 1918, when the General Dutch Union of Port Authority Workers merged with the Union of Seamen. Like both its predecessors, it affiliated to the Dutch Confederation of Trade Unions. In 1950, it was renamed as the Central Union of Transport Company Workers.

By 1954, the union had 35,216 members. At the end of 1955, it merged with the Dutch Transport Workers' Association, to form the Dutch Transport Workers' Union, although its mariners instead joined the Central Organisation of Sailors and Fishermen, and its dredgers transferred to the General Dutch Construction Union.

== Presidents ==
1918: Arie Heijkoop
1919: Johan Brautigam
1927:
1936: Arie Kievit
1947: Reint Laan
