= Jacobus Oldenbroek =

Dutch trade union leader and politician

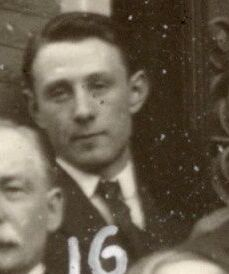
Jacobus Hendrik Oldenbroek in 1921

Jacobus Hendrik Oldenbroek (10 November 1897 – 7 March 1970) was a Dutch trade union leader and politician, who served as general secretary of the International Confederation of Free Trade Unions.

Born in Amsterdam, Oldenbroek became a clerk and joined the Nederlands Verbond van Vakverenigingen union. Through this, he met Edo Fimmen, and the two began working closely together. Along with Fimmen, he began working for the International Federation of Trade Unions in 1919, and then the International Transport Workers' Federation (ITF) in 1921.

Oldenbroek also joined the Social Democratic Workers' Party (SDAP), and was elected as a local councillor. However, in 1932 he was part of the left-wing split which formed the Independent Socialist Party (OSP), serving as its first treasurer. He continued working for the ITF, although the federation insisted that he put forward more centrist views in this role, and eventually required him to resign from the OSP, returning to the SDAP.

In 1937, Oldenbroek became assistant general secretary of the ITF, after Nathan Nathans was killed in the 1937 Beert KLM Douglas DC-2 crash. In this role, he devoted significant time to Germany, where trade unions had been made illegal. He established an underground network of sailors based in the country, and planned to remain in Amsterdam to further this activity even once it became clear that World War II was imminent. He also launched back into political activity, and was again elected as a local councillor in September 1939. Soon after, the ITF headquarters were evacuated to London, Fimmen also leaving for England. However, Fimmen soon became ill, and Oldenbroek was called to London to take over his duties. One of his first acts was to publicly call for crews of ships sailing under the flags of countries threatened by the Nazis to sail to Allied ports. He later set up an organisation of sailors from states occupied by the Nazis.

Fimmen died in 1942, and Oldenbroek succeeded him as acting general secretary of the ITF. As leader of the ITF, Oldenbroek served on the Extraordinary Advisory Council of the Dutch government-in-exile, and joined the board of directors of the International Labour Organization. His role as general secretary was made official in 1946, when he won election to the post, and he became active in the new World Federation of Trade Unions (WFTU). However, he became concerned that the largely communist leadership of the WFTU did not share the interests of the whole movement, and so became a leading figure in the split which formed the International Confederation of Free Trade Unions (ICFTU).

Oldenbroek became the ICFTU's first general secretary, but encountered increasing opposition from the more right-wing George Meany of the American AFL–CIO. This came to a head in 1960, when Meany argued for the ICFTU to adopt a top-down approach to trade unionism in Africa, while Oldenbroek wished local activists to take the lead. Meany threatened to withdraw the AFL–CIO from the ICFTU unless Oldenbroek resigned. Faced with the potential loss of a major affiliate, Oldenbroek stood down, but continued to work for the federation. In 1970, while on federation business in the Philippines, he contracted an infection and died.

Trade union offices
Preceded by Edo Fimmen	General Secretary of the International Transport Workers' Federation; 1946–1950	Succeeded by Omer Becu
Preceded by New position	General Secretary of the International Confederation of Free Trade Unions; 1949–1960	Succeeded by Omer Becu
