= Omer Becu =

Belgian trade unionist

Omer Liévin Benjamin Becu (21 August 1902 – 9 October 1982) was a Belgian trade unionist, who became General Secretary of the International Confederation of Free Trade Unions.

Born in Ostend, Becu trained as a radio operator and joined the merchant navy. He soon became involved in trade unionism, and in 1929 became the full-time assistant general secretary of the International Mercantile Marine Officers' Association. In 1932, he was elected as the union's general secretary, simultaneously becoming general secretary of the Belgian Union of Merchant Marine Officers. In this role, he gave support to the republicans in the Spanish Civil War.

Threatened by World War II, Becu escaped to the UK in 1940, continuing in his trade union posts. The International Transport Workers' Federation (ITF) took an interest in his activities, and in 1941 invited him to New York, where he set up a special section of the federation for workers in countries which had been occupied by the Nazis. In support of this, he travelled to North Africa, and later to Italy. He next returned to London, where he continued his ITF activity, making plans for the end of the war.

In 1944, Becu was able to return to Belgium, where he and some surviving comrades began re-establishing the trade union movement. He was elected as the president of the Belgian Union of Transport Workers, and in 1947 also became the president of the ITF. In 1950, he was appointed as the ITF's general secretary, giving up his posts in Belgium, and in 1953 he was additionally elected as president of the International Confederation of Free Trade Unions (ICFTU). His term of office ended in 1957, but he remained involved with the federation, and was elected as its general secretary in 1960, serving until his retirement in 1967.

Trade union offices
Preceded by Alex Brandt	General Secretary of the International Mercantile Marine Officers' Association; 1932–1940	Succeeded by Douglas Tennant
Preceded by Frans Daems	General Secretary of the Belgian Union of Transport Workers; 1945–1950	Succeeded by Roger Dekeyzer
Preceded by John Benstead	President of the International Transport Workers' Federation; 1947–1950	Succeeded by Robert Bratschi
Preceded by Jacobus Oldenbroek	General Secretary of the International Transport Workers' Federation; 1950–1960	Succeeded by Pieter de Vries
Preceded by Vincent Tewson	President of the International Confederation of Free Trade Unions; 1953–1957	Succeeded by Arne Geijer
Preceded by Jacobus Oldenbroek	General Secretary of the International Confederation of Free Trade Unions; 1960–1967	Succeeded by Harm Buiter
