= Central Union of Public Service Workers =

Belgian trade union

The Central Union of Public Service Workers (French: Union centrale Belge des travailleurs des services publics; Dutch: Belgische Centrale der Openbare Diensten, COD) was a trade union representing public sector workers in Belgium.

The union was founded sometime around 1910, and it affiliated to the Trade Union Commission (SK). It grew rapidly under the leadership of Louis Uytroever, and later Achilles De Roo, reaching 10,981 members by 1920. In 1937, it transferred to the General Labour Confederation of Belgium, successor of the SK, by which time, it had 16,225 members.

The union ceased to operate during World War II, but various branches survived, and in 1942 they merged into the new General Association of Public Services, which soon became part of the General Union of Public Services.
