= Eric Nevin =

British trade union leader

Eric Nevin (died 21 August 2009) was a British trade union leader.

Born in Waterloo, Merseyside, Nevin studied at St Mary's College, Crosby, on HMS Conway, and at Liverpool Technical College. He served in the Merchant Navy from 1948, and became a master seaman in 1957.

Nevin joined the Merchant Navy and Airline Officers' Association (MNAOA) and began working full-time for the union in 1959, initially as an assistant district secretary in Liverpool, but two years later he was promoted to become a national secretary. He rose to become assistant general secretary in 1971, and then in 1974 was elected as the union's general secretary.

As the leader of the union, Nevin set up the J. W. Slater Memorial Fund, in memory of his predecessor, and he served on a large number of external bodies. From 1985, this included the General Council of the Trades Union Congress. He organised a merger between the MNAOA and two smaller unions, forming the National Union of Marine, Aviation and Shipping Transport Officers. Nevin continued as general secretary until his retirement in 1988. He died in 2009, at the age of 78, following a long illness.

Trade union offices
Preceded by John Slater	General Secretary of the Merchant Navy and Airline Officers' Association; 1974–1985	Succeeded by Union merged
Preceded by New position	General Secretary of the National Union of Marine, Aviation and Shipping Transport Officers; 1985–1988	Succeeded by John Newman
