= Union of Factory Workers =

Belgian trade union

The Union of Factory Workers (French: Union Centrale des Travailleurs de Fabrique, Dutch: Centrale der Fabriekwerkers) was a general union in Belgium.

Various local unions of factory workers were formed in Belgium around the turn of the 20th century. In 1908, Christ Mahlman attempted to unite these unions as the Belgian Factory Workers' Union. This initiative struggled, but the union was later reestablished in 1910 as the "Union of Factory Workers," affiliated with the Trade Union Commission. Initially a small organization with only 3,500 members in 1913, it grew quickly during World War I; by 1920 it had 51,283 members.

The union's rapid growth led to numerous demarcation disputes with other unions. Consequently, at the beginning of 1921, it merged with the recently founded Building and Wood Workers' Union to form the General Union of Building, Furnishing and Other Industries.

The union was led by national secretary August De Bruyne. From 1919, Dore Smets also served as a district secretary.
