= International Mercantile Marine Officers' Association =

The International Mercantile Marine Officers' Association (IMMOA) was a global union federation bringing together trade unions representing officers in merchant navies.

== History ==
The federation was established on 16 June 1925, at a meeting attended by representatives of unions from Belgium, Denmark, France, Germany, the Netherlands, Norway, Spain, and the United States. It set up headquarters in Antwerp, and successfully negotiated representation on the Joint Maritime Commission of the International Labour Organization. From the start, it also represented navigators, engineers, and ships' doctors, and the International Federation of Radio Officers soon affiliated to the federation.

Omer Becu became the union's secretary in 1932. In 1940, he escaped to London, moving the IMMOA's headquarters there. The International Transport Workers' Federation (ITF) had also evacuated to London, and it began working closely with the IMMOA. Becu was seconded to ITF work, and the British Navigators' and Engineering Officers' Union took over the leadership of the federation.

By 1946, the federation had decided to fully integrate with the ITF. It recommended that all its affiliates join the ITF, and refocused its activity on promoting friendship and co-operation among ships' officers. It undertook little activity, holding a conference in 1948, and the penultimate meeting of its board of directors in 1951, but remained in existence.

In 1964, the federation held one final directors' meeting, recommending that the organisation be wound up, and this was agreed at a final congress, held the following year. The IMMOA's assets were transferred to the ITF's Edo Fimmen Free Trade Union Fund.

== Leadership ==
=== General Secretaries ===
1925: Alex Brandt
1932: Omer Becu
1940: Douglas Tennant

=== Presidents ===
1925: François Mas
1940: William Harry Coombs
1948: Pieter de Vries
