= Roger Dekeyzer =

Belgian politician

Roger Dekeyzer (18 June 1906 – 16 December 1992) was a Belgian trade union leader.

Born in Ostend, Dekeyzer became an English teacher, and the unpaid secretary of the Socialist Union of Education Workers of West Flanders. In 1925, he joined the Belgian Workers' Party, and from 1928 he served on the executive of its Ostend branch. In 1935, he began working full-time for the Belgian Union of Transport Workers (BTB), as deputy secretary of its West Flanders district. The following year, he was promoted to become district secretary, and also secretary of the union's coastal area car drivers' section.

In 1939, Dekeyzer was elected to both the Ostend Municipal Council, and the West Flanders Provincial Council. He fled to the United Kingdom early in World War II, and worked organising Belgian sailors there. He became active in the International Transport Workers' Federation (ITF), and was placed in charge of organising Belgian, Danish, Dutch, Polish and French transport workers in Scotland.

Dekeyzer returned to Belgium at the end of the war, and was elected as secretary of the General Federation of Belgian Labour (ABVV). He also served as general secretary of the BTB and of its ports section, and as secretary of the Belgian Socialist Party's Ostend district. He soon moved to Antwerp, and in 1952, was elected to the municipal council, then in 1954 to the provincial council, and finally in 1958 was elected to the Senate.

In 1955, Dekeyzer was appointed as vice-president of the ABVV, then as president the following year. Omer Becu, president of the BTB, left to work for the ITF, and Dekeyzer's role of general secretary was merged with that of president of the union. He was also elected as vice-president of the ITF, then in 1960 became president of the ITF.

Dekeyzer retired from his trade union and political posts in 1971, but remained on the boards of various organisations for the next decade. He died in 1992.

Trade union offices
Preceded by ?	General Secretary of the Belgian Union of Transport Workers; 1945–1971	Succeeded by Alfons Daems
Preceded by Omer Becu	President of the Belgian Union of Transport Workers; 1950–1971	Succeeded by Ward Cassiers
Preceded by ?	President of the General Federation of Belgian Labour; 1956–1957	Succeeded by Willy Schugens
Preceded by Frank Cousins	President of the International Transport Workers' Federation; 1960–1962	Succeeded by Frank Cousins
