= Mark Dickinson (trade unionist) =

British trade union leader

Anthony Mark Dickinson (born January 1962) is a British trade union leader.

Dickinson joined the Merchant Navy at the age of 16, completing a cadetship, then became a navigating officer before leaving to attend university. After graduating, he worked for the UK Chamber of Shipping, then joined the International Transport Workers' Federation (ITF). In 1995, he became assistant general secretary of the ITF, and led its campaign against flags of convenience.

Dickinson moved to work for the National Union of Marine, Aviation and Shipping Transport Officers (NUMAST) in 2000, in which role he was central to setting up the Maritime Labour Convention. In 2009, NUMAST merged to form Nautilus International, and Dickinson was elected as its first general secretary. He was also elected to the General Council of the Trades Union Congress (TUC), and in 2024 was elected as President of the TUC. On election, he noted that he was the first member of his union to hold the post, and the first seafarer since Tom Yates in 1958.

Trade union offices
| Preceded by Graham Brothers; Ake Selander | Assistant General Secretary of the International Transport Workers' Federation; 1995–2000; With: Graham Brothers | Succeeded by Stuart Howard |
| Preceded by Brian Orrell | General Secretary of Nautilus International; 2009–2026 | Succeeded by Sascha Meijer |
| Preceded by Matt Wrack | President of the Trades Union Congress; 2024–2025 | Succeeded by Steve Gillan |
