= Committee for Another Policy =

Committee for Another Policy: Comité voor een Andere Politiek; Comité pour une Autre Politique
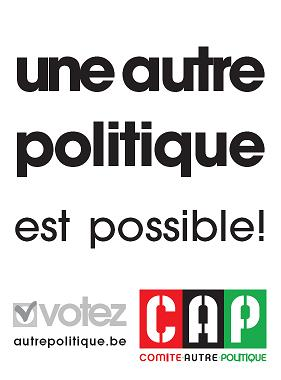
- Founded: 2005
- Ideology: Socialism
- Colours: Red

Website
- www.anderepolitiek.be (Dutch); www.autrepolitique.be (French)

The Committee for Another Policy (Dutch: Comité voor een Andere Politiek, French: Comité pour une Autre Politique), abbreviated to CAP, was a Belgian left-wing political movement that was established in 2005, and became a political party in 2006.

== Formation ==
The initiators of the committee are the Belgian politicians Jef Sleeckx (former SP.A-MP), Lode Van Outrive (former MEP for the SP.A, and former ABVV) and ETUC chairman Georges Debunne. All three have been active in the Belgian socialist movement for several decades.

On 28 October 2006, a foundation congress took place at the ULB in Brussels. Various existing left-wing groups, like the LSP, the KP and the SAP, committed their support to the idea of a new broad left-wing political formation.

== Elections in 2007 ==
At a second congress, held on 3 February 2007, it was decided by a great majority of the participants to take part in the Belgian federal elections of 10 June 2007. The CAP participated with 239 candidates in these elections and got 0.4% of the vote for both the Chamber of People's Representatives and the Senate.

== Election results ==
=== Federal Parliament ===
Chamber of Representatives
Election year	# of overall votes	% of overall vote	% of language group vote	# of overall seats won	# of language group seats won	+/-
2007	20,083	0.30		0 / 150		

Senate
Election year	# of overall votes	% of overall vote	% of language group vote	# of overall seats won	# of language group seats won	+/-
2007	21,215	0.32		0 / 40		
2010	6,254		0.10	0 / 40		0
