= William Harry Coombs =

William Harry Coombs (15 July 1893 – 23 June 1969) was a British sailor, insurance company founder, barrister and trade union leader.

Just 4 feet 10 tall, Coombs trained on HMS Conway, then began his career surveying the Hooghly River. During World War I, he served as a lieutenant in the Royal Navy, then after the war he transferred to the Merchant Navy, becoming a master in 1919. The following year, he travelled to Shanghai to undertake cartographic work, and during the course of this became aware that there was no insurance covering officers in the service.

On returning to the United Kingdom, Coombs founded the Navigators' and General Insurance Company. This proved successful, and in 1928, he founded the Officers (Merchant Navy) Federation, bringing together various small bodies representing this group. These activities also led him to study the law, and in 1932, he became a barrister at Inner Temple. He became increasingly convinced that Merchant Navy officers needed a trade union, and so in 1936 reformed the Officers Federation as the Navigators' and Engineer Officers' Union. He initially served as its general secretary, then in 1942 switched to become president. From 1940 until 1948, he additionally served as president of the International Mercantile Marine Officers' Association.

Coombs was made an honorary captain in the Royal Naval Reserve, and used this title in his work. He retired from all his posts in 1958, and died in 1969, while at sea.

Trade union offices
Preceded by New position	General Secretary of the Navigators' and Engineer Officers' Union; 1935–1942	Succeeded by Douglas Tennant
Preceded by François Mas	President of the International Mercantile Marine Officers' Association; 1940–1948	Succeeded by Pieter de Vries
