= Georges Debunne =

Belgian trade unionist (1918–2008)

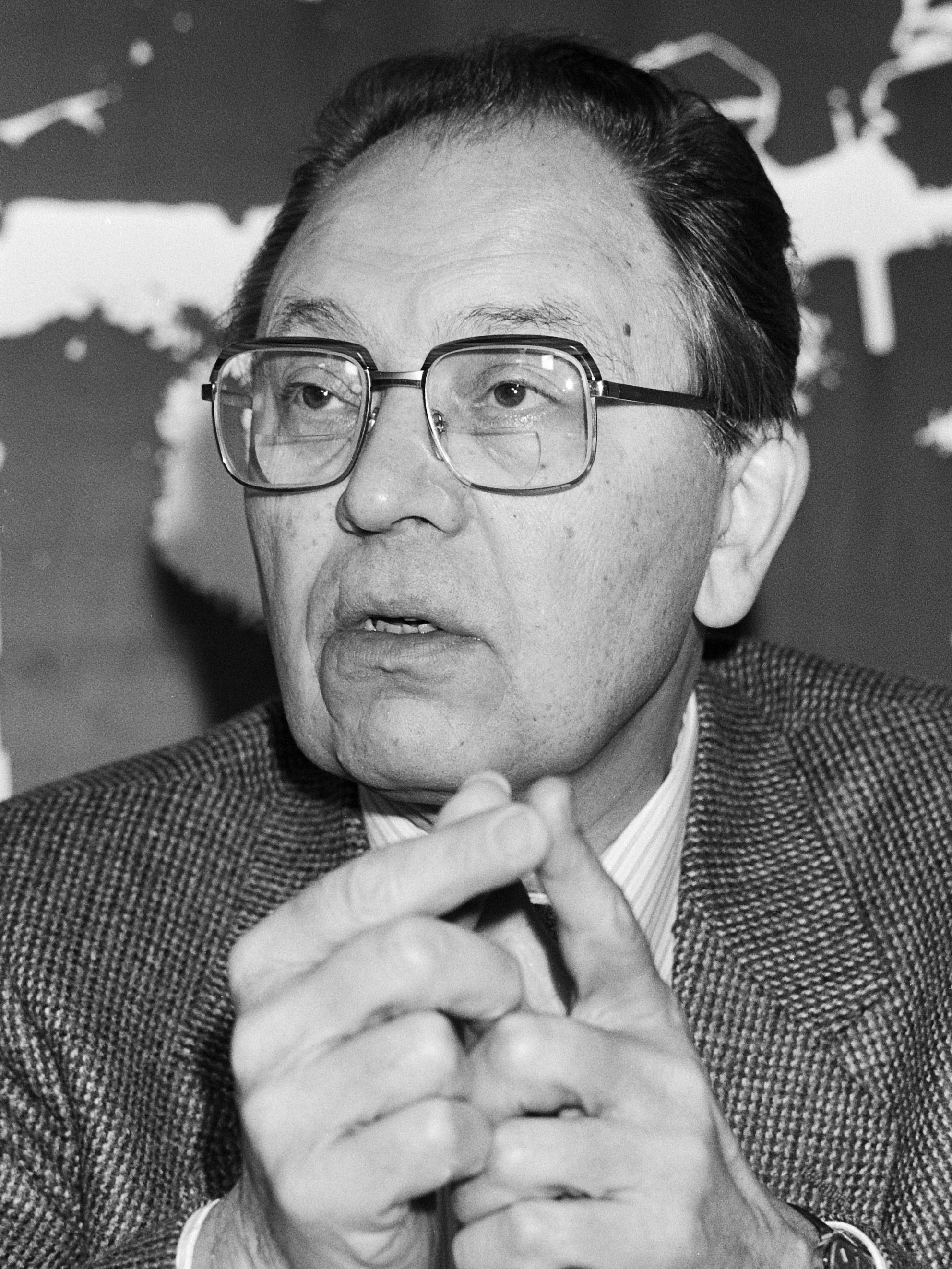
Debunne in 1983

Georges Debunne (2 May 1918 – 21 September 2008) was a Belgian trade union leader.

Born in Menen, Debunne qualified as a teacher, and worked in Halle, joining the trade union. After World War II, he was elected as full-time secretary of the civil engineering section of the General Union of Public Services, then as national secretary of its civil service section. In 1956, he was elected as president of the union. In 1968, he was elected as general secretary of the General Federation of Belgian Labour, and also as a vice-president of the International Confederation of Free Trade Unions. In 1983, he was elected as president of the European Trade Union Confederation (ETUC). He retired in 1985, becoming secretary of the ETUC's Federation of Retired and Elderly People.

In 2005, Debunne was a founder of the small Committee for Another Policy political party.

Trade union offices
Preceded by Henri Janssen	President of the General Union of Public Services; 1956–1968	Succeeded by Edmond Hamont
Preceded by Louis Major	General Secretary of the General Federation of Belgian Labour; 1968–1982	Succeeded by Alfred Delourme
Preceded by Wim Kok	President of the European Trade Union Confederation; 1982–1985	Succeeded by Ernst Breit
