= John Slater (trade unionist) =

John William Slater (3 May 1920 – 24 April 1974) was a British trade unionist. He served on the General Council of the Trades Union Congress and has been memorialised by a fund set up in his name.

Slater was born in Shetland, Scotland, and joined the Merchant Navy and the National Union of Seamen, serving during World War II. In 1943, he obtained a master mariner's certificate and became a navigating officer, transferring to the Merchant Navy and Airline Officers' Association (MNAOA). He began working full-time for the union as its London officer in 1954, then served consecutively as its national secretary and assistant general secretary.

In 1971, Slater was elected as General Secretary of the MNAOA. This led him to greater international prominence, serving with the International Transport Workers' Federation and attended conferences of the International Labour Organization. In 1972, he was elected to the General Council of the Trades Union Congress, and he also chaired the employee side of the National Maritime Board.

Slater suffered an accident in his London office in April 1974, and died as a result of the injuries he received. Three years later, the MNAOA set up the J. W. Slater Fund, to support ratings in the Merchant Navy for those who wished to qualify as master mariners, as Slater had done.

Trade union offices
Preceded by Douglas Tennant	General Secretary of the Merchant Navy and Airline Officers' Association; 1971–1974	Succeeded by Eric Nevin
