= Textile-Clothing-Diamond Union =

The Textile-Clothing-Diamond Union (Flemish: Centrale voor Textiel, Kleding en Diamant, TKD; Walloon: Centrale du Textile, Vêtement et Diamant, TVD) was a trade union representing workers in various industries in Belgium.

The union was founded in 1994, when the Union of Belgian Textile Workers merged with the Union of Clothing Workers and Kindred Trades in Belgium and the General Diamond Workers' Association of Belgium. By 1995, the union had 48,868 members, of whom 90% worked in clothing and textiles, and the remaining 10% in the diamond industry. Like its predecessors, the union affiliated to the General Federation of Belgian Labour.

Employment in all the industries covered by the union declined rapidly, so, on 1 January 2014, the union merged into the General Union. Its final president was Dominique Meyfroot.

== Presidents ==
1994: Jef Hoymans
2000s: Dominique Meyfroot
