= Central Organisation of Sailors and Fishermen =

Trade union representing seafarers in the Netherlands

The Central Organisation of Sailors and Fishermen (Dutch: Centrale van Zeevarenden ter Koopvaardij en Visserij, CKV) was a trade union representing seafarers in the Netherlands.

The union was founded in 1956, when the Central Board of Captains and Officers of the Merchant Navy merged with the fisheries section of the Central Union of Transport Workers. Like both its predecessors, it affiliated to the Dutch Confederation of Trade Unions.

By 1966, the union had 9,127 members, of whom 15% worked in fishing. The following year, it merged with the General Association of Seafarers, to form the Federation of Maritime Workers.

== Presidents ==
1956: Pieter de Vries
1958: Willy van Zuylen
