= Teachers' International Trade Secretariat =

Former global union federation (1926–1946)

The Teachers' International Trade Secretariat or International Trade Secretariat of Teachers (ITST) was a global union federation bringing together unions representing schoolteachers.

== History ==
The International Federation of Civil Servants and Teachers was formed in 1925, but in many countries, teachers were not part of the same unions as civil servants, and preferred to organise separately. As a result, in November 1926, the International Federation of Trade Unions sponsored the creation of a new "Teachers' International Trade Secretariat", which brought together the teachers' unions from the old federation, along with some other trade unions. Like its predecessor, it affiliated to the International Federation of Trade Unions. It established headquarters in Brussels.

In 1945, the federation affiliated to the new International Professional Department of Education (DPIE), and the following year, it merged into the new World Federation of Teachers' Unions. Some members unions refused to join, and instead helped found the new Joint Committee of International Teachers' Federations.

== Affiliates ==
As of 1935, the federation had a total membership of 108,750, in the following affiliates:

Union	Country	Affiliated membership
Dutch Indies Teachers' Society	Dutch East Indies	2,000
Federation of Education Workers	Spain	2,000
General Federation of Teachers	France	90,000
Middle School Teachers' Union	Luxembourg	100
Socialist Teachers' Group	Czechoslovakia	1,400
Socialist Teachers' Union	Norway	100
Socialist Teachers' Union	Switzerland	150
Socialist Union of Education Workers	Belgium	5,500
Union of Dutch Teachers	Netherlands	7,000
Union of Emigrant Germany Teachers	France	150

== Leadership ==
=== Secretaries ===
1927: Louis Klein
1936: Joseph Bracops

=== Presidents ===
Lebaillif
1936: Ludovic Zoretti
