= Corneel Mertens =

Belgian trade unionist and politician

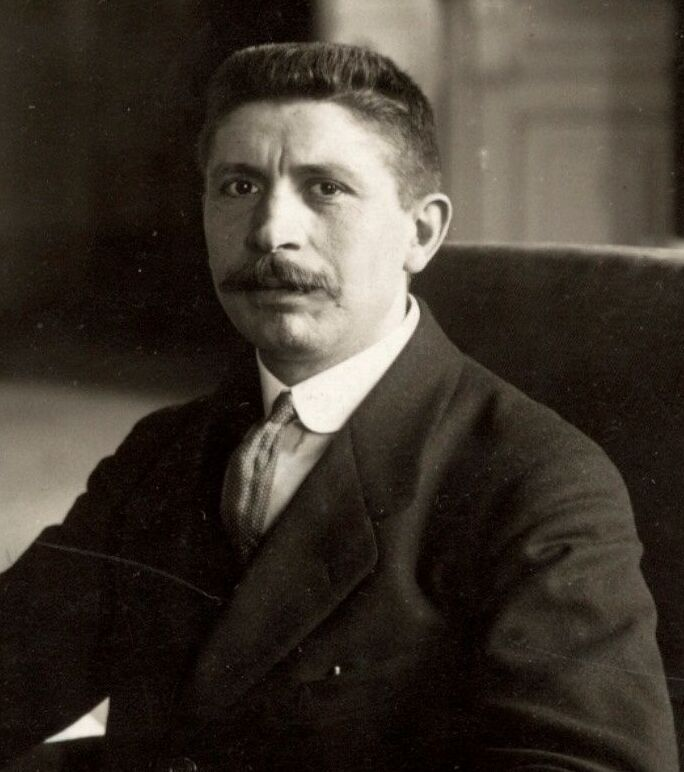
Corneel Mertens (1919)

Corneille Mertens (29 January 1880 – 18 March 1951) was a Belgian trade unionist and politician.

== Biography ==
Born in the St Andrey area of Antwerp, Mertens became a bookbinder, and taught himself to speak several languages. He joined the Bookbinders' Union of Antwerp, and in 1905 was elected as its general secretary. He proved successful in the role, and in 1911 moved to become the full-time secretary of the Belgian National Trade Union Centre. In 1913, he was elected to the executive of the Belgian Labour Party, with responsibility for trade union matters. As a trade union leader, he focused on achieving an eight-hour working day, forming joint industrial committees with employers, and opposing communism.

After World War I, Mertens was elected as a vice president of the International Federation of Trade Unions, and served on its executive committee. From 1919 to 1937, he also served as the president of the workers' group in the International Labour Organization. From 1924, he was additionally president of the Union of Bookworkers of Belgium.

In 1925, Metens was co-opted as a member of the Belgian Senate. He retired from his trade union posts shortly before World War II, but remained a senator until 1949.

Trade union offices
Preceded by	General Secretary of the Trade Union Commission; 1920–1937	Succeeded by Union restructured
Preceded by Jean Pladet	President of the Union of Bookworkers of Belgium; 1924–1945	Succeeded by Union merged
