= General Union of Public Services =

Belgian trade union

The General Union of Public Services (Dutch: Algemene Centrale der Openbare Diensten, ACOD; French: Centrale Générale des Services Publics, CGSP) is a trade union representing public sector workers in Belgium.

The union's origins lie in four unions active before World War II: the National Union of Rail, Post, Telegraph, Telephone, Marine and Aviation Workers, the Central Union of Public Service Workers, the Socialist Union of Education Workers and the National Union of Civilian National Defense Staff. These unions ceased to operate during the war, but various branches survived and in 1942 they formed the General Association of Public Services (ASOD). In 1945, the General Federation of Belgian Labour (ABVV) was established. At a conference on 28 and 29 April, it merged ASOD with several recently created unions of government workers, to form ACOD.

The union soon became one of the most important in the ABVV, with membership growing from 70,000 in 1945, to 250,000 in 1997. In 1968, the small Belgian Union of Tramway and Municipal Transport Workers merged in. All public service employees are eligible to join the union, and by 1995, 40% of its members worked in administration, 20% in health, with the remainder divided between the railways, communication, utilities, and other minor sectors. It has generally been associated with the left wing of the union movement.

== Presidents ==
1945: Joseph Bracops
1946: Henri Janssen
1957: Georges Debunne
1968: Edmond Hamont
1982: Roger Piton
1993: Jacques Lorez
2000: Henri Dujardin
2003: Guy Biamont
2006: Karel Stessens
2014: Michel Meyer
