= Sascha Meijer =

Dutch trade union leader

Sascha Meijer is a Dutch trade union leader.

Meijer trained as a lawyer and became involved in the trade union movement around 2004. In 2015 she began working for Nautilus International as a senior national secretary, then became vice chair of its Netherlands branch in 2017. In this role, she represented maritime trade unions in the European Union in negotiations with the European Commission and shipowners.

In 2024, Meijer was appointed as international assistant general secretary of Nautilus International, and in 2026 she was elected as general secretary of the union. On election, she listed the safety and work-life balance of members as priorities.

Trade union offices
| Preceded by Mark Dickinson | General Secretary of Nautilus International; 2026–present | Succeeded by Incumbent |
