= Belgian Typographical Federation =

Former Belgium printers trade union

- French: Fédération typographique belge (FTB); Dutch: Belgische Typografische Federatie (BTF)
- Founded: 1869
- Dissolved: 1941
- Location: Belgium

The Belgian Typographical Federation (French: Fédération typographique belge, FTB; Dutch: Belgische Typografische Federatie, BTF), also known as the Belgian Book Printers' Union, was a trade union representing printers in Belgium.

The union was established in 1869, when local unions of typographers in Brussels, Antwerp and Ghent merged. It was the first trade union in the country to operate on a national basis. Until World War I, the union was dominated by the Brussels section, the Free Association of Typographical Compositors of Brussels, which focused on encouraging printers in other areas of the country not to move to Brussels. By establishing strong branches in other towns, it succeeded in this, and the relative shortage of printers in Brussels enabled it to raise wages. Following action from 1909 to 1911, it achieved a maximum nine-hour working day.

In 1920, the union achieved an eight-hour day and further wage increases. A national executive was appointed to lead the union, although it often came into conflict with the more radical Brussels branch. When the Brussels branch went on strike, in 1931 for higher wages and better conditions, the national union provided no support. The strike failed, and the Brussels branch was left with large debts. Membership of the union peaked at 6,803 in 1927, then gradually fell. In 1924, the union was pressured by the Trade Union Commission to join the Union of Bookworkers of Belgium (CBB), but it consistently refused to do so.

In 1936, the union took part in the general strike, as a result of which it obtained six days annual paid leave, and another wage increase. It was banned by the Nazi occupiers at the end of 1941, although its leadership managed to retain control of its pension fund. After the war, former members of the union joined with the CBB, to form the Paper and Publishing Industry Union.

== Presidents ==
1883: Pierre-Joseph Rousseau
1890: Gustave Defnet
1891: Charles Callewaert
1891: Félix Van Ausloos
1903: Jean Pletinckx
1907: Alfred Durieux
1914: Gustave Conrardy
1920:
1929: Louis Stordeur
1932: Alexander Theunissens
