= International Federation of Radio Officers =

The International Federation of Radio Officers (IFR) was a global union federation bringing together trade unions representing marine radio and telegraph operators.

== History ==
The federation was established in June 1922, at a conference in Brussels, as the International Federation of Radio-Telegraphists. It set up headquarters in London, and affiliated to the International Mercantile Marine Officers' Association.

By 1932, the federation had affiliates from Australia, Belgium, Canada, Denmark, Estonia, Finland, France, Germany, Greece, Iceland, the Netherlands, Norway, Portugal, Spain, Sweden, the United Kingdom, and the United States. From about 1950, it was generally known as the "International Federation of Radio Officers", although its alternative French name remained the Fédération internationale des radio-télégraphistes.

== Leadership ==
=== General Secretaries ===
1922: H. Robinson
T. J. O'Donnell
1938: Harry J. Perkins
1949: Hugh O'Neill
1950s: Gösta Hilding
1950s: J. Madsen
1960s: Böje Larsen

=== Presidents ===
1922: J. Madsen
