= Merchant Navy and Airline Officers' Association =

Former trade union of the United Kingdom

- Merged into: National Union of Marine, Aviation and Shipping Transport Officers
- Founded: 1956
- Dissolved: 1985
- Headquarters: Oceanair House, High Road, Leytonstone
- Location: United Kingdom
- Members: 34,650 (1980)
- Publication: The Telegraph
- Affiliations: TUC, BSJC, ITF, IMMOA

The Merchant Navy and Airline Officers' Association (MNAOA) was a trade union representing officers in the United Kingdom.

The origins of the union lay in 1921, when Captain W. H. Coombes founded the Navigators and General Insurance Company Ltd. It offered insurance for officers in the merchant navy against the possibility of the Board of Trade cancelling their certificate of competency. A succession of small rivals began offering similar services, prompting Coombes to expand operations to the insurance of small vessels. He also created a trust to administer the company, and this began representing officers in negotiations with employers and the government.

Over time, the trade union functions of the company increased and, in 1935, the Navigators and Engineering Officers' Union was created to take these on, with all policyholders becoming members. In 1956, the Marine Engineers' Association merged in, and the union was renamed as the MNAOA. In 1985, it merged with the Radio and Electronic Officers' Union to form the National Union of Marine, Aviation and Shipping Transport Officers.

== General Secretaries ==
1935: William Harry Coombs
1943: Douglas Tennant
1971: John Slater
1974: Eric Nevin
