= Association of Employees, Technicians and Managers =

Belgian trade union

The Association of Employees, Technicians and Managers (Dutch: Bond van Bedienden, Technici en Kaderleden, BBTK; French: Syndicat des Employés, Techniciens et Cadres, SETCa) is a trade union representing white collar staff in Belgium.

The union was founded in 1920, as the General Union of Employees, Warehousemen, Technicians and Travelling Salesmen of Belgium, with about 12,000 members. It ceased to operate during World War II, but was re-established in 1945, under its current name, as an affiliate of the new General Federation of Belgian Labour (ABVV).

The union grew during the 1950s and 1960s, establishing joint industrial committees across the sectors it covered, and the union led campaigns for early retirement. The 1970s and 1980s saw more industrial action in protest at cuts to jobs and government spending, culminating in the 1993 general strike. By 1995, the union had more than 200,000 members, with 25% working in commerce and catering, 25% in production, 20% in banking and finance, and the remainder spread across a wide variety of industries. In 1996, the Paper and Publishing Industry Union merged in to the BBTK.

== Presidents ==
1945: Charles Everling
1956: Oscar Leclercq
1971: Maurice Massay
1977: François Janssens
1990: Karel Boeykens
1992: Christian Roland
2006: Erwin De Deyn
2019: Myriam Delmée
