= Socialist Union of Education Workers =

Belgian trade union

The Socialist Union of Education Workers (French: Centrale du Personnel enseignant socialiste; Dutch: Centrale van het Socialistisch Onderwijzend Personeel, CSOP) was a trade union representing workers in the education sector in Belgium.

The union was founded in 1913, and affiliated to the Trade Union Commission (SK). In 1924, it was joined by the Independent Trade Union of Education Workers in Antwerp. It also affiliated to the Teachers' International Trade Secretariat, and by 1935, it had 5,500 members. In 1937, it transferred from the SK to its successor, the General Labour Confederation of Belgium. It ceased to operate during World War II, but various branches survived, and in 1942 they merged into the new General Association of Public Services, which soon became part of the General Union of Public Services.

Prominent figures in the unions included national secretary Henri Jansen, and West Flanders secretary Roger Dekeyzer.
