= National Union of Rail, Post, Telegraph, Telephone, Marine and Aviation Workers =

Belgian trade union

The National Union of Rail, Post, Telegraph, Telephone, Marine and Aviation Workers (French: Syndicat National des Ouvriers et Employés des Chemins de Fer, Postes, Télégraphes, Téléphone, Marine et Aéronautique, ChPTTMA; Dutch: Nationaal Syndikaat der Werklieden en Bedienden der Ijzerwegen, Post, Telegraaf, Telefoon, Zeewezen en Vliegwezen, IJPTTZL) was a trade union representing transport and communications workers in Belgium.

The union was founded in 1917, when Prosper de Bruyn organised the merger of numerous railway workers' unions. It also accepted members who worked in communications, and in marine transport, and so was initially known as the National Union of Railways, Post, Telegraph, Telephone and Marine Workers. It affiliated to the Trade Union Commission (SK), and was one of its largest members, with 90,013 members by 1920. It then gradually declined, and by 1937 was down to 41,310 members. That year, it transferred from the SK to its successor, the General Labour Confederation of Belgium. It ceased to operate during World War II, but various branches survived, and in 1942 they merged into the new General Association of Public Services, which soon became part of the General Union of Public Services.
