= Pieter de Vries =

Dutch trade union leader

Pieter de Vries (1897 – November 1975) was a Dutch trade union leader.

De Vries became a sailor when he was 18, and joined a trade union two years later. From 1927 to 1931, he worked for the Amsterdam Chamber of Trade in the Dutch East Indies. He then returned to the Netherlands, and in 1932, he became the assistant secretary of the Master Mariners' and Mates' Union. He held the post until 1942, when the Nazis dissolved all the Dutch trade unions.

In 1947, de Vries was elected as president of the Netherlands Seafarers' and Fishermen's Union. The following year, he was additionally elected as president of the International Mercantile Marine Officers' Association, although this organisation was largely inactive, so the role involved little work. He also became prominent in the International Transport Workers' Federation (ITF), becoming the chair of its Fishermen's Section.

De Vries retired from his position in the Dutch union in 1958. He relocated to London to become the ITF's Director of Regional Affairs. The ITF's general secretary, Omer Becu, left to take a new role in 1960, and with his backing, de Vries was narrowly elected as his successor. He was re-elected by fewer than 500 votes in 1962, and retired in 1965.

Trade union offices
| Preceded by William Harry Coombs | President of the International Mercantile Marine Officers' Association; 1948–1964 | Succeeded by Union dissolved |
| Preceded by New position | President of the Central Organisation of Sailors and Fishermen; 1956–1958 | Succeeded by Willy van Zuylen |
| Preceded by Omer Becu | General Secretary of the International Transport Workers' Federation; 1960–1965 | Succeeded by Hans Imhof |
