= National Union of Marine, Aviation and Shipping Transport Officers =

UK trade union

The National Union of Marine, Aviation and Shipping Transport Officers (NUMAST) was a United Kingdom trade union representing seafarers and allied workers that existed between 1985 and 2006. It then changed its name to Nautilus UK and, in 2008, it merged with the Dutch trade union Nautilus NL to form Nautilus International.

== Origins ==
NUMAST traced its roots back more than 150 years, when the Mercantile Marine Service Association was founded in 1857 in response to the harsh laws of the 1850 Merchant Shipping Act.

In 1936, the MMSA merged with the Imperial Merchant Service Guild and retained its name. Six years later, it became a member of the Officers’ Federation, which was established in 1928 in an attempt to foster cooperation between all the organisations representing British and Commonwealth officers.

Meanwhile, the Association of Wireless Telegraphists was established in 1912 in response to the growing use of telegraphy at sea. Mergers and name changes down the years culminated in the formation of the Radio and Electronic Officers' Union (REOU) in 1967.

Representation for ships' engineers began in the late 19th century, and two unions came together to form the Marine Engineers’ Association (MEA) in 1899.

The Navigating & Engineer Officers' Union (NEOU) was born in the mid-1930s and in 1956, following more than a decade of cooperation on issues of common concern, the MEA and the NEOU joined to form the Merchant Navy & Airline Officers' Association (MNAOA).

== History ==
The union was established in 1985, when the Merchant Navy and Airline Officers' Association merged with the Radio and Electronic Officers' Union and the Mercantile Marine Service Association.

The union originally included aviation personnel, such as flight navigators and flight engineers, however these members were transferred to BALPA, the airline pilots' union by 1990.

On 2 October 2006, the union formed the Nautilus Federation with the Dutch Federation of Maritime Workers (FWZ), and changed its name to Nautilus UK. FWZ became Nautilus NL at the same time.

== Nautilus International ==
In 2008, members of Nautilus UK and Nautilus NL voted overwhelmingly in favour of proposals to create a new single trans-boundary union for maritime professionals, the two merging into Nautilus International on 15 May 2009.

== General Secretaries ==
1985: Eric Nevin
1988: John Newman
1993: Brian Orrell
