= Alfons Van Uytven =

Belgian trade union leader (1920–2008)

Alfons Van Uytven (11 December 1920 – 29 December 2008) was a Belgian trade union leader.

== Life and career ==
Born in Leuven on 11 December 1920, Van Uytven joined the Tobacco Workers' Union (BCVT), and in 1950 was elected as its general secretary. In 1952, he was additionally elected as general secretary of the International Federation of Tobacco Workers (IFTW).

By 1953, the BCVT had only 3,809 members, and it felt that this was insufficient to continue, so in 1954, it merged into the General Union (AC). Van Uytven became national secretary of the AC, and remained in his IFTW post until 1958, when it merged into the International Union of Food and Drinks Workers' Associations.

In 1976, Van Uytven was elected as the general secretary of the General Union, serving until 1980.

Van Uytven died on 29 December 2008, at the age of 88.

Trade union offices
Preceded by Frans van Uytven	General Secretary of the Tobacco Workers' Union; 1950–1954	Succeeded by Union merged
Preceded by Dirk Nak	General Secretary of the International Federation of Tobacco Workers; 1952–1958	Succeeded by Federation merged
Preceded by Emiel Janssens	General Secretary of the General Union; 1976–1980	Succeeded by André Vanden Broucke
