= Union of Belgian Textile Workers =

Trade union in Belgium

- Textielarbeiderscentrale van België
- Centrale des Ouvriers Textiles de Belgique
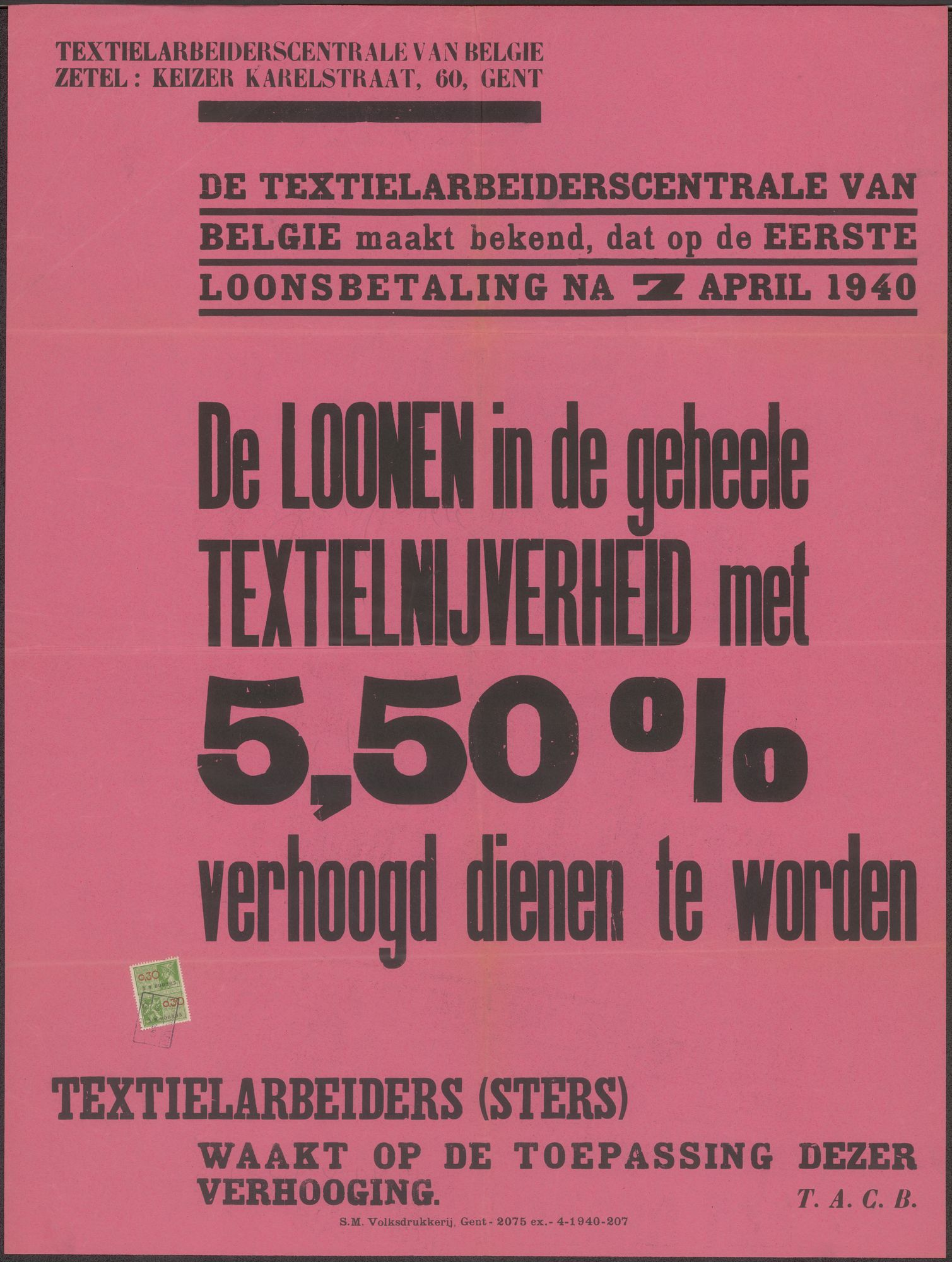
- Flyer advertising a pay increase won by the Union, 1940
- Abbreviation: TACB/COTB
- Merged into: Union of Clothing Workers and Kindred Trades in Belgium; General Diamond Workers' Association of Belgium
- Successor: Textile-Clothing-Diamond Union
- Established: 1898
- Type: Trade union
- Headquarters: 60 Keizer Karelstraat
- Location: Ghent
- Members: 79,953 (1953)
- Official languages: Flemish and Walloon
- Affiliations: General Labour Federation of Belgium
- Formerly called: National Textile Workers' Association of Belgium (1898-1908); Textile Workers Center of Belgium (1908)

The Union of Belgian Textile Workers (Dutch: Textielarbeiderscentrale van België, TACB; Walloon: Centrale des Ouvriers Textiles de Belgique, COTB) was a trade union representing workers in the textile trades in Belgium.

The union was founded in 1898 as the National Textile Workers' Association of Belgium, linked to the Belgian Workers Party. In 1908, it became the Textile Workers Center of Belgium, with the wool workers federation of Verviers joining. However, after World War I, the Flemish leadership decided to centralise the union, and the Verviers federation left, only rejoining in 1935. In 1945, the union was a founding constituent of the General Federation of Belgian Labour.

The union's membership peaked at 79,953 in 1953, then fell steadily, in line with employment in the industry. By 1993, it had only 28,126 members. The following year, it union merged with the Union of Clothing Workers and Kindred Trades in Belgium and the General Diamond Workers' Association of Belgium, to form the Textile-Clothing-Diamond Union.

== Presidents ==
1921: Alfons Segier
1932:
1954: Alfons Baeyens
1963: Marcel Lefèvre
1976:
1980: Jan Monserez
1988: Donald Wittevrongel
