= Leather Workers' Union =

The Leather Workers' Union (Dutch: Centrale der Leder- en Vellenbewerking van België) was a trade union representing workers in the leather and shoe industries in Belgium.

The union was established in 1919, on the initiative of the Belgian Shoeworkers' Union, which merged into it. Compared to its forerunner, the new union had a far more centralised structure, and it looked to expand by absorbing smaller unions. In 1921, the glove makers' union joined, and overall membership reached 10,000. However, the union struggled to recruit the approximately 15,000 Jewish workers in the leather trades. In 1939, the Union of Clothing Workers and Kindred Trades in Belgium proposed a merger, but the Leather Workers' Union rejected the idea.

In the early 1950s, there was a major strike in the shoemaking trade in Izegem. The Leather Workers' Union feared that it would be unable to sustain the action, but the General Union gave its support. Concerned about its viability, the Leather Workers' Union merged into the General Union on the 1 January 1953.
