= Union of Belgian Stoneworkers =

Trade union in Belgium

The Union of Belgian Stoneworkers (Dutch: Centrale der Steenbewerkers van België; French: Centrale des Ouvriers de la Pierre de Belgique, COPB) was a trade union representing quarry workers in Belgium.

The union was founded in 1889 as the National Association of Stone and Plaster Workers. It included quarry workers, stonemasons, and paviours, although the quarry workers were always the strongest section, and the stonemasons later left to join the construction workers' union. From 1893, the union published Le Carrier, but until 1906 it achieved little.

The union undertook a lengthy strike in Écaussinnes in 1908, and this experience led it to restructure. It became the more centralised "Union of Belgian Stoneworkers" on 1 January 1909, and by the end of the year, it had 6,435 members. It was initially known for its high membership fees, but it reduced these, and by 1913, it had 13,920 members, more than 30% of the total workforce.

After World War I, employment in the industry declined, as mechanisation increased, but initially the union's membership continued to grow, reaching a peak of 25,752 in 1921. The following year, it secured an agreement for an eight-hour working day in the industry.

The union's leader, Hubert Lapaille, was a leading figure in the Belgian Resistance during World War II. After the war, the union was a founding constituent of the General Federation of Belgian Labour, but it emerged from the war much weakened, with fewer members than its communist rival.

Membership did not increase, and by 1964 it had only 6,443 members. On the 1 January 1965, the union merged into the General Union.

== Secretaries ==
- 1889: Rondas
- 1893: Pierre Lalemand
- 1909: Léon Denis
- 1913: Ernest Martel
- 1932: Hubert Lapaille
- 1953: Jules Taminiaux
