= General Diamond Workers' Association of Belgium =

Trade union in Belgium

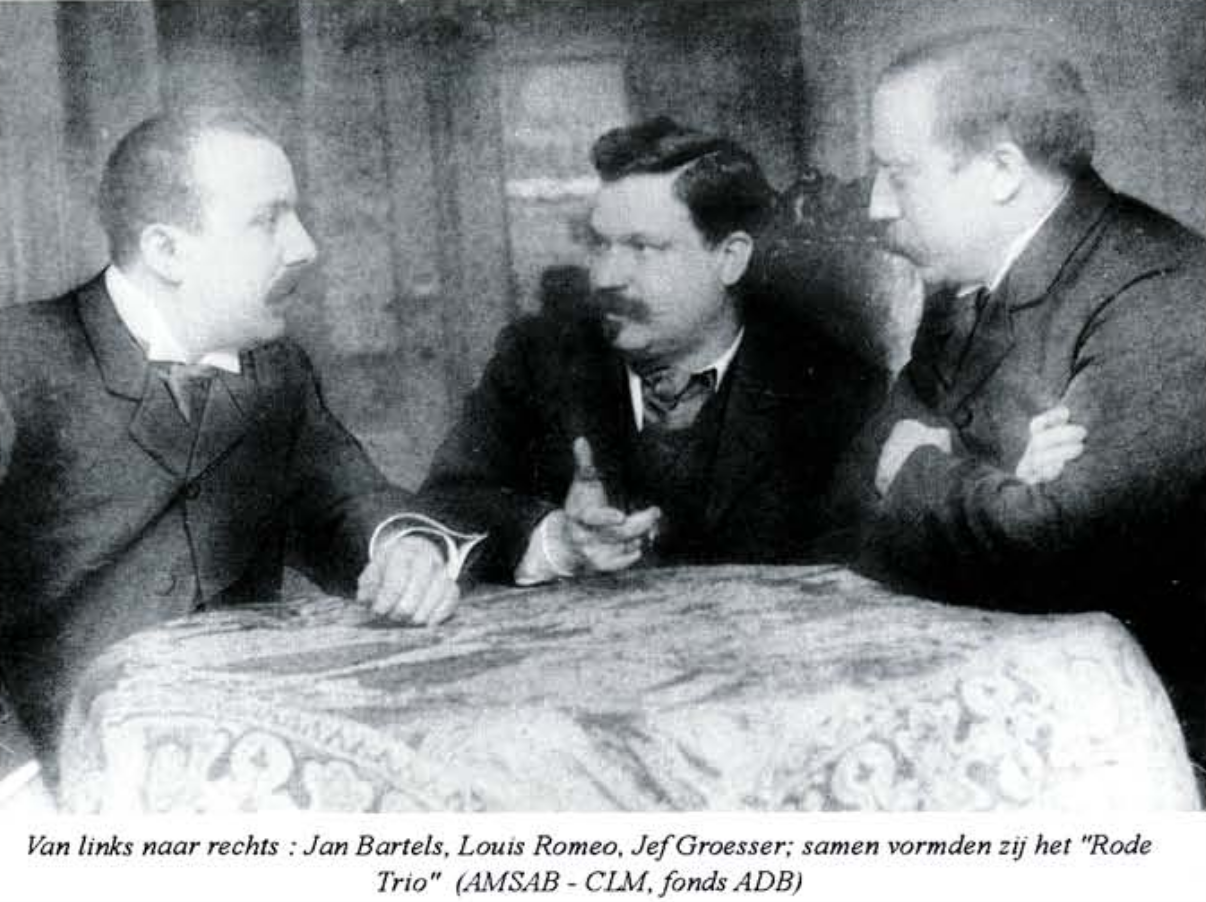
Jan Bartels, Louis Romeo, and Jef Groesser, known as the Red Trio of the General Diamond Workers Association of Belgium

The General Diamond Workers' Association of Belgium (Flemish: Algemene Diamantbewerkersbond van België, ADB; Walloon: Syndicat des Ouvriers Diamantaires) was a trade union representing workers in the diamond trade in Belgium. It became one of the most powerful trade unions in Belgium in the interwar period.

The union was founded on 19 August 1895, as the Antwerp Diamond Workers' Association, with considerable support from the already better organised General Diamond Workers' Union of the Netherlands (Dutch: Algemene Nederlandse Diamantbewerkersbond, ANDB). It rapidly became one of the leading trade unions in the city. Unlike many unions, it did not affiliate to the Belgian Workers Party, although almost all of its leading members were active in the party. A group of members who wanted to work closely with the party split away in 1911, but after Louis Van Berckelaer (nl) was elected as leader of the ADB in 1912, he reunified the groups.

Together with the Dutch ANDB, the ADB set up the Universal Alliance of Diamond Workers in 1905, and shared its headquarters with this small international trade secretariat. The union gradually expanded into unionising diamond workers in the countryside, and in 1929 it set up De Daad, the most modern diamond cutting factory in Belgium at the time.

Many union members were Jewish and were killed during World War II. After the war, the industry entered a gradual decline, and the union focused on maintaining pay and conditions. It affiliated to the General Federation of Belgian Labour, and membership peaked in 1955 at 12,304, then declined to only 2,694 by 1992. At the start of 1994, it merged with the Union of Belgian Textile Workers and the Union of Clothing Workers and Kindred Trades in Belgium, to form the Textile-Clothing-Diamond Union.
