= Tobacco Workers' Union (Belgium) =

The Tobacco Workers' Union (Dutch: Belgisch Centraal Verbond voor Tabaksbewerkers, French: Central Belge de travailleurs du tabac) was a trade union representing workers in the tobacco industry in Belgium.

The union was founded on 22 November 1908, on the initiative of the National Federation of Cigar Makers, which merged into the new union. Like its predecessor, the union supported the emigration of members who struggled to find work, and it founded branches in the United States for Belgian tobacco workers there. In its early years, the union also focused on promoting the use of union labels on tobacco boxes, showing that the contents had been made by unionised workers.

The union's membership peaked at 10,000 in 1919, when it secured the eight-hour working day for the industry. However, branches in Turnhout moved to the union's Christian rival, and as tastes switched from cigars to cigarettes, increased mechanisation saw the total workforce in the industry fall. It was a founder constituent of the General Federation of Belgian Labour in 1945. By 1953, it had only 3,809 members, and it felt that this was insufficient to continue. On 1 April 1954, it merged into the General Union.

From 1950, the union's secretary was Alfons Van Uytven, who also became secretary of the International Federation of Tobacco Workers.
