= Belgian Union of Tramway and Municipal Transport Workers =

The Union of Tramway and Municipal Transport Workers (Dutch: Belgische Centrale Van Tram- Buurtspoorweg- en Autobuspersoneel, BCTBAP; French: Centrale Belge du personnel des tramways, vicinaux et autobus, CBPT) was a trade union representing public sector transport workers in Belgium.

The union was founded in 1919 as the National Federation of Tram Personnel. In 1945, it was a founding constituent of the General Federation of Belgian Labour. In 1947, it affiliated to the Belgian Union of Transport Workers, but it split away again in the early 1950s. Its membership peaked at 17,588 in 1953, then fell steadily. By 1967, it had only 6,309 members, and the following year, it merged into the General Union of Public Services.

== Presidents ==
1944: Arthur Vercruyce
1950: Sylvain Romain
