= Belgian Union of Transport Workers =

Belgian trade union

The Belgian Union of Transport Workers (Dutch: Belgische Transportbond, BTB; French: Union Belge du Transport, UBT) is a trade union representing transport workers in Belgium.

== History ==
The union was founded on 6 June 1913, with the merger of numerous local port, sailors' and transport workers' unions, giving it an initial membership of 8,000. During World War I, the union was largely inactive, but it was revived in 1919, and created a new section for ships' stewards.

The union was successful in the early 1920s, and in 1925 was able to fund the construction of a sanatorium, De Mick. It took part in a major strike at the port in Antwerp in 1928, and then in the Belgian general strike of 1936. During World War II, the union was forced to stop activity in the Netherlands, but a few leaders including Omer Becu escaped to the United Kingdom and were able to keep the union running from there.

In 1947, the Belgian Union of Tramway and Municipal Transport Workers merged into the union, and immediately became its largest sector, just ahead of its port membership, but it split away again in the early 1950s. Despite this, membership peaked at 32,224 in 1958, then gradually fell, to only 23,225 in 1995. Since then, its membership has increased, reaching 46,068 in 2010.

As of 2011, the union has two sections: Ports, Road Transport and Logistics; and Maritime.

== Presidents ==
1913: Piet Somers
1919: Henri Van Eyken
1935: Frans Daems
1945: Omer Becu
1950: Roger Dekeyzer
1971: Ward Cassiers
1977: Louis Eggers
1982: Egide Baudet
1987: Remi Van Cant
1991: Martin Devolder
1995: Alfons Geeraerts
2001: Ivan Victor
2016: Frank Moreels
