= Nautilus International =

- Nautilus International
- Founded: 15 May 2009; 17 years ago
- Headquarters: London, United Kingdom; Rotterdam, The Netherlands; Basel, Switzerland
- Location(s): United Kingdom; Netherlands; Switzerland
- Members: ▲19,089 (2024)
- General Secretary: Sascha Meijer
- Affiliations: TUC; STUC; GFTU; ITWF; IFSMA; FNV; Nautlius Federation
- Website: nautilusint.org

Nautilus International is an international trade union and professional association representing seafarers and allied workers, which is based in the United Kingdom, the Netherlands and Switzerland.

== Organisation ==
The union's head office is in London, UK; its General Secretary is Mark Dickinson. The union also has offices in Rotterdam, The Netherlands, and Basel, Switzerland.

Nautilus International is affiliated to the International Transport Workers' Federation, International Federation of Shipmasters Associations, the UK Trades Union Congress, the Federation of Dutch Trade Unions and the Nautilus Federation.

== Membership ==
The union's membership in 2016 stood at more than 22,000; 15,043 in the UK (male: 14,537, female: 506). This includes "shipmasters, officers, cadets, ratings, yacht crew, VTS officers, harbourmasters, river boatmen, nautical college lecturers, maritime lawyers and even ship-based medical personnel".

== History ==
On 2 October 2006, the British National Union of Marine, Aviation and Shipping Transport Officers and the Dutch Federation of Maritime Workers formed the Nautilus Federation. The two unions changed their names to Nautilus UK, and Nautilus NL, respectively, and worked closely together on an industrial and political level.

In 2008, members of Nautilus UK and Nautilus NL voted overwhelmingly in favour of proposals to create a new single trans-boundary union for maritime professionals. Nautilus International was born on 15 May 2009. In 2011, Swiss maritime professionals and boatmen, formerly represented by Swiss union Unia, voted to join Nautilus International. In 2015, FNV Waterbouw also became part of the union.

== General Secretaries ==
2009: Mark Dickinson
2026: Sascha Meijer
