= General Union (Belgium) =

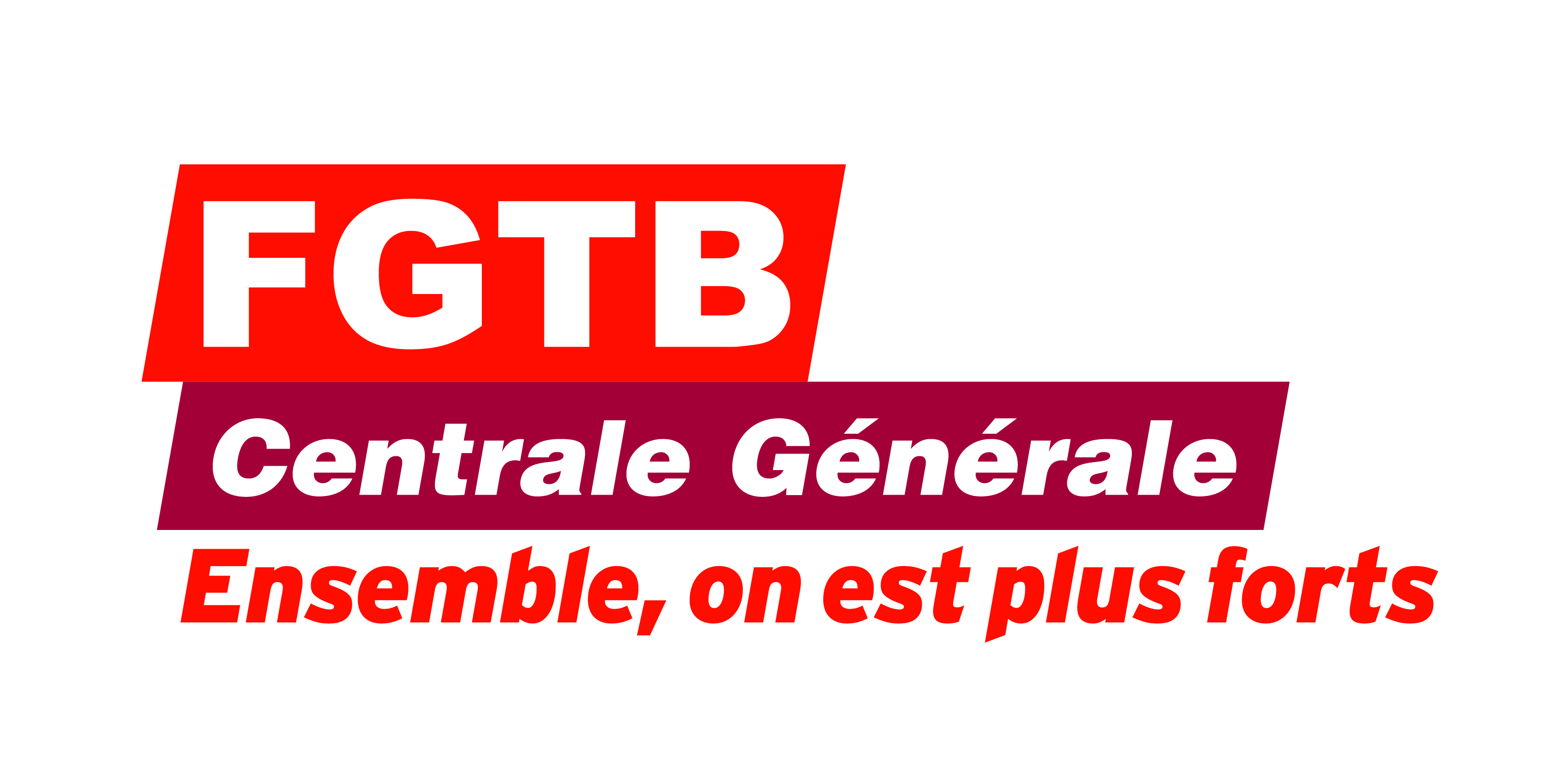
Logo Centrale Générale - FGTB

The General Union (Dutch: Algemene Centrale, AC; French: La Centrale Générale, CG) is a general union representing workers in Belgium.

== History ==
The union was founded on 1 January 1921, when the Building and Wood Workers' Union merged with the Union of Factory Workers. It was originally known as the General Union of Building, Furnishing and Other Industries. Several other unions merged over the next few years: the National Federation of Glass Workers in 1929, the Hairdressers' Union in 1930, and the Paviours' and Assistants' Union of Belgium in 1936.

In its early years, the union focused on campaigning for an eight-hour working day, and for wage increases. It also founded its own holiday camp, at Floreal. During World War II, the union had little involvement with the Belgian Resistance, but few of its leaders actively collaborated.

After the war, mergers continued, with the Leather Workers' Union joining in 1953, and the Tobacco Workers' Union in 1954, then the Union of Belgian Stoneworkers in 1965, the Union of Mineworkers of Belgium in 1994, and finally the Textile-Clothing-Diamond Union in 2014. As a result, it has a highly diverse membership. In 1995, 20% of its members worked in construction, and 20% in transport, with a wide variety of sectors represented among the other 60%.

The union had 123,160 members on formation, its lowest membership being 68,016 in 1928. Since 1952, it has been the largest affiliate of the General Federation of Belgian Labour. In 2020, it had 419.382 members.

== Presidents ==
1932: Emile Gryson
1946: Paul Fassin
1949: Dore Smets
1966: Emiel Janssens
1976: Alfons Van Uytven
1980: André Vanden Broucke
1982: Jean De Nooze
1984: Juan Fernandez
1992: Michel Nollet
1992: Hans Raes
1998: Maurice Corbisier
2006: Alain Clauwaert
2015: Paul Lootens
2015: Werner Van Heetvelde
