= Union of Clothing Workers and Kindred Trades in Belgium =

The Union of Clothing Workers and Kindred Trades in Belgium (Dutch: Centrale der Kleding en Aanverwante Vakken van België, CKAVB; French: Centrale du Vêtement et Parties Similaires de Belgique, CVPS) was a trade union representing workers in the clothing industry in Belgium.

The union was founded on 16 March 1919, with the merger of the unions of tailors, tailors' cutters, hat makers, fur workers, linen workers and dyers. For many years, it had the lowest level of unionisation of any industry in Belgium: 4.5% in 1933.

From 1920, the union was led by Frans Liebaers, who was a member of the Belgian Workers Party. Under his leadership, the union's funds were secreted with Paul Finet during World War II, and after the war, the union was a founder of the General Federation of Belgian Labour (ABVV). In 1952, Liebaers opposed a 24-hour strike by the ABVV for the reduction of the length of compulsory military service, and was removed from office.

The union's membership grew during the 1940s, 1950s and 1960s, peaking at 32,268 in 1976, then fell gradually; by 1993, it had 22,658 members. The following year, it merged with the Union of Belgian Textile Workers and the General Diamond Workers' Association of Belgium, to form the Textile-Clothing-Diamond Union.

== Presidents ==
1978: Frans Christiaenssens
1991: Jef Hoymans
