= Food, Hospitality and Services Union =

Food & service trade union in Belgium

The Food, Hospitality and Services Union (Dutch: Centrale van de Voeding, Horeca en Diensten, HORVAL; French: Centrale Alimentation, Horeca & Services) is a trade union representing workers in the food and service sector in Belgium.

The union was founded in 1905 when the National Bakers' Federation merged with the National Confectioners' Federation, to form the National Food Federation. In 1921, the Belgian Central Union of Landworkers also joined, followed by the Union of Belgian Cooks in 1925, and the Union of Personnel in the Hotel Industry in 1929.

The union was a founding constituent of the General Federation of Belgian Labour in 1945, and became known as the Union of Food and Hotel Workers. In 1946, a section split to form Food Production Van Sina, but this rejoined in 1955. This saw the start of a steady increase in membership; by 2008, the union had 109,391 members.

== Presidents ==
Arthur Ladrille
Alfons de Mey
2011: Alain Detemmerman and Tangui Cornu
