= William Lucy (labor leader) =

American trade union leader (1933–2024)

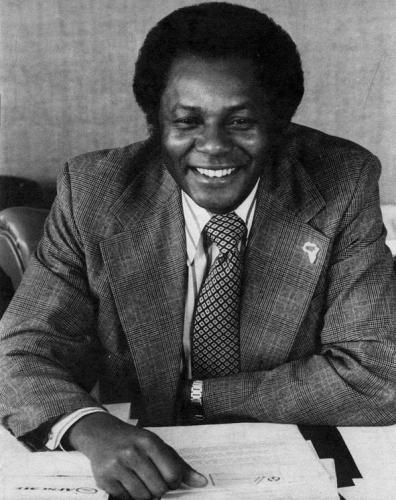
- Lucy in 1984
- Born: November 26, 1933; Memphis, Tennessee, U.S.
- Died: September 25, 2024 (aged 90); Washington, D.C., U.S.
- Education: UC Berkeley
- Occupations: Labor and community organizer
- Spouse: Dorothea Raider (m. 1953; died 2000)
- Children: 3

William Lucy (November 26, 1933 – September 25, 2024) was an American trade union leader. He served as Secretary-Treasurer of the American Federation of State, County and Municipal Employees (AFSCME) from 1972 to 2010.

== Life ==
Lucy was born to Susie and Joseph Lucy in Memphis, Tennessee, on November 26, 1933, and grew up in Richmond, California. In the early 1950s, he served in the U.S. Navy, and studied civil engineering at the University of California, Berkeley but did not obtain a degree. He worked for Contra Costa County as a materials and research engineer, where he would work for the next thirteen years. During this period of time, Lucy started working within the labor movement.

Lucy served on the board of directors of the NAACP.

Lucy married Dorothea Raider in 1953; they had three children and were married until her death in 2000. Lucy died at his home in Washington, D.C., on September 25, 2024, at the age of 90.

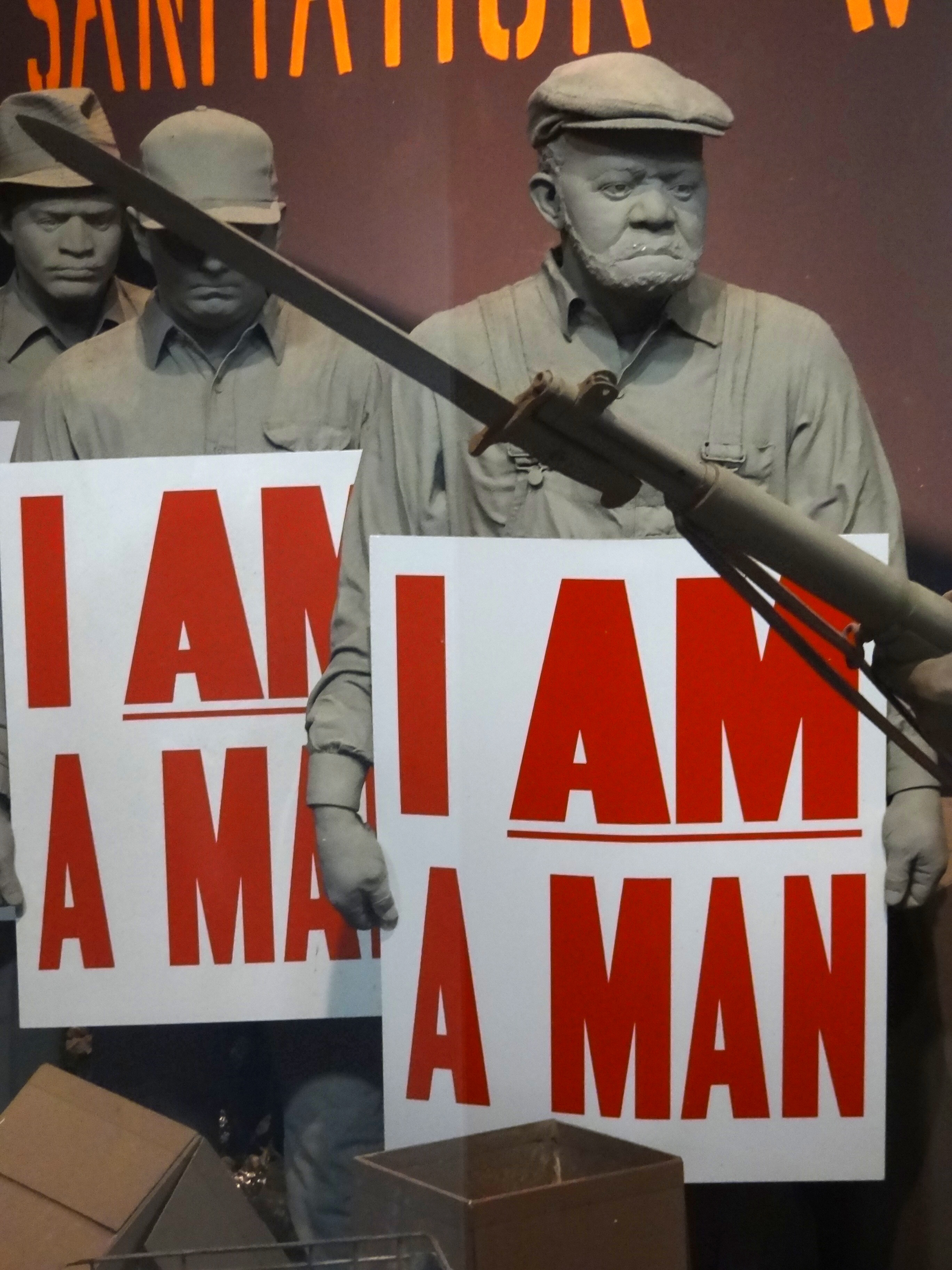
Diorama of Memphis Strikers featuring the famous slogan "I Am A Man!"

== Labor movement ==
Lucy became a member of the American Federation of State, County and Municipal Employees (AFSCME) Local #1675 in 1956 and was elected as its president in 1965. He began working full-time at AFSCME's national headquarters in Washington, D.C. the following year as associate director of legislation and community affairs.

Lucy served as Secretary-Treasurer of AFSCME from 1972 until retiring from the position in 2010. During that period, Lucy co-founded the Coalition of Black Trade Unionists (CBTU), along with fellow black unionists Nelson Edwards, William Simons, Charles Hayes, and Cleveland Robinson. Lucy was elected its first president and continued to serve in that capacity until 2013, when the role was assumed by Terrence Melvin.

Lucy was elected president of Public Services International in 1994, the first African American to hold the post. In 1995, he was appointed to the AFL–CIO executive council. He has also served as vice-president for the AFL–CIO's Maritime Trades, Professional Employees, and Industrial Union departments.

== Memphis sanitation strike ==
In 1968, as part of his leadership role with AFSCME, Lucy lent his support to Martin Luther King Jr. and the mostly black sanitation and other service workers in Memphis who were striking for better wages and benefits. In spite of King's assassination in April 1968, Lucy continued the work in Memphis, helping see the strike to a successful resolution. Lucy is credited with the famous slogan, "I Am A Man!" that became the rallying call for the Memphis strikers.

== Free South Africa Movement ==
Lucy co-founded the Free South Africa Movement, a grassroots anti-apartheid campaign, and was part of the movement for over 20 years. He was part of an AFL–CIO delegation monitoring elections when Nelson Mandela was elected the first black president of the Republic of South Africa.

== Notes ==
Trade union offices
Preceded by Monika Wulf-Mathies	President of the Public Services International; 1994–2002	Succeeded by Ylva Thörn
