= Monika Wulf-Mathies =

German politician

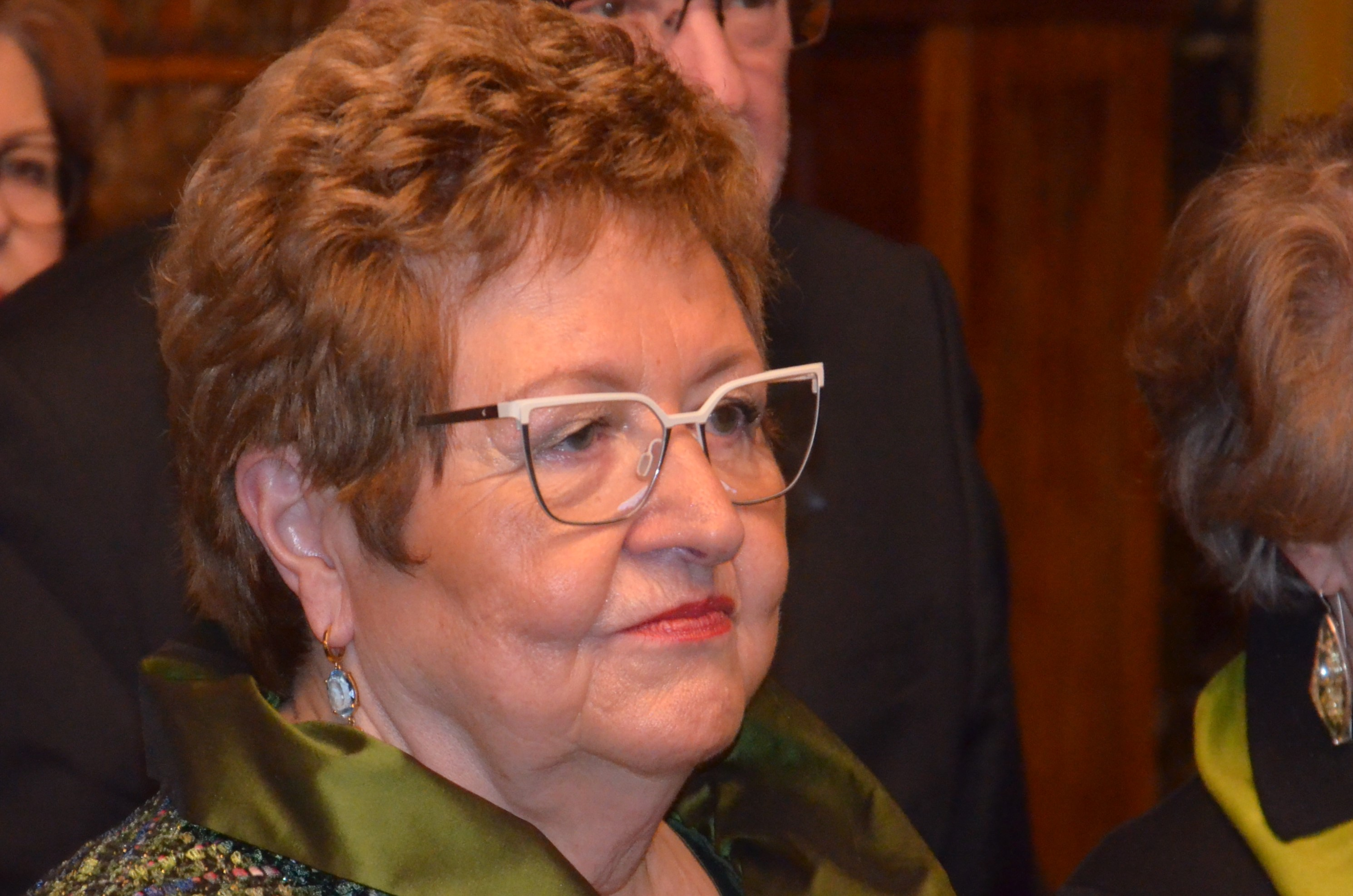
- Wulf-Mathies in 2018

European Commissioner for Regional Policy
- In office 1995–1999
- President: Jacques Santer
- Preceded by: Bruce Millan
- Succeeded by: Michel Barnier

Personal details
- Born: Monika Baier; 17 March 1942 (age 84) Wernigerode, Germany
- Party: Social Democratic Party of Germany (SPD)

Monika Wulf-Mathies (born 17 March 1942) is a German politician, who was European Commissioner for Regional Policy.

== Early life ==
Wulf-Mathies was born in the rural town of Wernigerode in 1942 after her family was evacuated from wartime Hamburg.

== Career ==
In 1971, at the age of 29, Wulf-Mathies joined the then German Chancellor Willy Brandt’s office in Bonn. In the government of Chancellor Helmut Schmidt, she later led the Federal Chancellery’s department of social affairs.

In 1976, Wulf-Mathies left the chancellor’s office to join the managing board of the public service trade union ÖTV. Four years later, and to many observers’ surprise, she was elected as the first woman ever to lead one of Germany's most powerful unions, succeeding Heinz Kluncker. In this capacity, she also served as president of Public Services International (PSI) from 1989 until 1995.

In 1994, Wulf-Mathies was – again unexpectedly – appointed as one of Germany's two European Commissioners by Chancellor Helmut Kohl; she succeeded Peter Schmidhuber. From 1994 until 1998, she served as European Commissioner for Regional Policy in the administration of President Jacques Santer.

After leaving the European Commission, Wulf-Mathies served as Executive Vice President Head of Corporate Public Policy and Sustainability at Deutsche Post from 2001 until 2009, working under the leadership of the company's CEO Klaus Zumwinkel. From 2009 until 2011 she worked as policy advisor to the Board of Management, this time under Frank Appel.

In 2018, Wulf-Mathies was appointed by intendant Tom Buhrow to lead an internal investigation into allegations of sexual harassment at German public broadcaster Westdeutscher Rundfunk (WDR).

== Other activities ==
- Leibniz Association, Member of the Senate (since 2010)
- Beethoven Foundation, Chairwoman of the Board of Trustees (since 2004)
- Friedrich Ebert Foundation (FES), Member of the Board of Trustees
- Gegen Vergessen – Für Demokratie, Member of the Advisory Board
- University of Bonn, Deputy Chairwoman of the University Council (2008-2013)
- Deutsche Lufthansa, Member of the Supervisory Board (1978-1995)
- European Movement Germany, Honorary President

== Controversy ==
When Home Affairs Minister Friedrich Zimmermann published memoirs in which he described trying to dampen her negotiating ardour by putting his hand on her knee, Wulf-Mathies demanded and obtained a retraction of the offending work from circulation.

Trade union offices
Preceded by Heinz Kluncker	President of the Public Services, Transport and Traffic Union; 1982–1994	Succeeded by Herbert May
Preceded by Victor Gotbaum	President of the Public Services International; 1989–1994	Succeeded by William Lucy
Political offices
Preceded by Peter Schmidhuber	German European Commissioner; 1994-1998	Succeeded by ?
