= Adolph Kummernuss =

German trade union leader

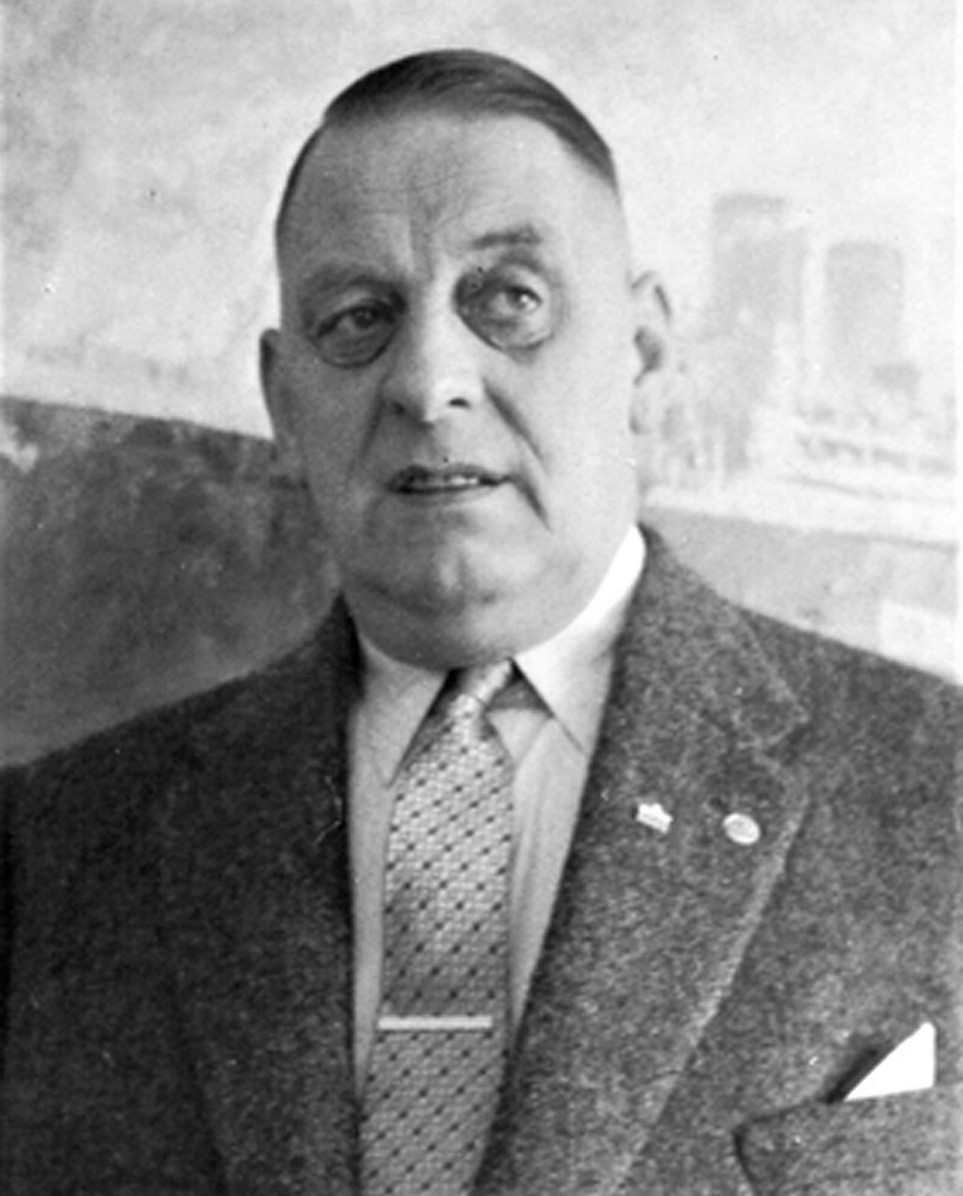
Adolph Kummernuss, ver.di archives.

Adolph Kummernuss (23 June 1895 – 7 August 1979) was a German trade union leader.

Born in Hamburg, Kummernuss found work in the city's port, and joined the youth wing of the Social Democratic Party of Germany (SPD), then in 1912 became a full party member. That year, he also joined the German Transport Workers' Union. In 1915, he was conscripted into the army, serving on the Eastern Front and then after a serious injury, on the Western Front, before being invalided out in 1918.

After the war, Kummernuss took a variety of jobs, and gradually rose to prominence in his union and in the SPD. He strongly opposed the Nazis, and when they forceably dissolved the unions, in 1933, he continued to organise illegal union meetings, working closely with the International Transport Workers' Federation. He was arrested in 1935, and spent several months in the Fuhlsbüttel concentration camp, before being sentenced to two years in prison. He was released in 1937, and found work in a warehouse, later becoming a factory manager.

As soon as World War II finished, Kummernuss began organising a trade union in the civil service of the British occupying force. In 1947, he was elected as chair of the new Local Committee of Greater Hamburg of the German Trade Union Confederation, which represented the trade unions in the region, and also became the founding president of the Public Services, Transport and Traffic Union of the British Zone. From 1946 until 1949, he also served on the Hamburg Citizen's Committee, representing the SPD.

In 1949, Kummernuss' union established the national Public Services, Transport and Traffic Union (ÖTV), closely based on its structure - for example, not including railway workers - and Kummernuss was elected as its first president. He also played a prominent role in establishing the German Trade Union Confederation (DGB), and served on the executive of the Public Services International (PSI). He was sharply critical of former Nazi Party members re-entering public life, and was often spoken of as a possible future leader of the DGB. However, he decided to focus on the ÖTV and, from 1956, an additional role as President of the PSI.

Kummernuss' term as leader of the ÖTV ended in 1961, and as he was above the age limit, he was due to retire. However, the union voted strongly to change the by-laws so he could continue. In 1962, he was appointed to the Economic and Social Committee of the European Economic Community. He retired from his trade union work in 1964, moving to Lübeck. In 1971, he was elected to the seniors' council of the SPD. He died in 1979, and was buried at sea.

Trade union offices
Preceded by New position	President of the Public Services, Transport and Traffic Union; 1949–1964	Succeeded by Heinz Kluncker
Preceded by Tom Williamson	President of the Public Services International; 1956–1964	Succeeded by Gunnar Hallström
