= Ernest Michaud =

French trade union leader

Ernest François Michaud (5 December 1884 – 8 August 1939) was a French trade union leader.

Born in Breloux-la-Crèche, Michaud trained as a carpenter, then found work on the railways. In 1910, he joined the local railway workers' union, becoming its assistant secretary in 1911. In 1913, he moved to Paris, to work on the railways there, and in 1915, he became the secretary of the Parisian railway workers' union. In 1918, he became the administrator of the railway workers' orphanage.

In 1920, Michaud was sacked for taking part in a strike. He instead found work as the town hall secretary in Gassicourt. This led him to join the National Federation of Public Service Employees and Workers, and in 1925, he was elected as its full-time general secretary.

From 1927 until 1937, Michaud served on the National Economic Council. In 1932, he stood unsuccessfully for the French Section of the Workers' International in the 3rd district of the 11th arrondissement of Paris. In 1933, he became the general secretary of the International Federation of Employees in Public Services, leading it through a successful merger with the International Federation of Civil Servants.

Michaud's union took part in a merger in 1936, which admitted many communists to the union. While Michaud retained his post, he opposed their influence, and contributed to the anti-communist Syndicats newspaper. He resigned from his trade union roles in 1937, becoming the secretary of a town hall in Nice. He remained an active trade unionist, and was suspended from work for several months for taking part in a strike in November 1938.

Trade union offices
Preceded by Maurice Copigneaux	General Secretary of the National Federation of Public Services; 1925–1937	Succeeded by Lucien Jayat
Preceded by Ludwig Maier	General Secretary of the International Federation of Employees in Public Services; 1933–1937; With: Charles Laurent (1935–1937)	Succeeded by Charles Laurent
