= VGS =

VGS may refer to:

== Education ==
- Videregående skole, upper secondary school in Norway

== Gaming ==
- Voice Game System, a communication tool used in many team based online-multiplayer games
- Connectix Virtual Game Station, a PlayStation emulator.

== Military ==
- Escort Scouting Squadron, a U.S. Navy aviation unit designation used from 1942 to 1943
- Volunteer Gliding Squadron

== Music ==
- Voodoo Glow Skulls, skacore band

== Places ==
- Arcot, Tamil Nadu, India
- Vince Genna Stadium, a baseball park in Bend, Oregon, US

== Symbols ==
- V_{GS} means gate to source voltage in field effect transistors (electronics)

== Trade unions ==
- Union of Municipal and State Workers, former trade union in Germany
