= Central Union of Sailors of Germany =

The Central Union of Sailors of Germany (German: Zentralverband seemännischer Arbeiter Deutschlands) was a trade union representing sailors and related workers in the German merchant navy.

Albert Störmer, leader of the Hamburg sailors' union, called a conference of local sailors' unions in June 1897, which agreed to establish a national agitation committee. This launched the journal Der Seemann in November, and also held a national congress, which formed the Central Union of Sailors of Germany on 1 February 1898. The union affiliated to the General Commission of German Trade Unions and the International Transport Workers' Federation, and adopted Der Seemann as its journal.

From 1900, the union was led by Paul Müller, who gradually moved the union to more centrist positions, achieving the introduction of health insurance for German sailors, while also arguing that black people should not be employed in the industry.

The union always worked closely with the Union of Dockers of Germany, and from the mid-1900s, it formed a loose association with other German transport workers' unions. It grew slowly, and by 1909 had 7,541 members. At the start of 1910, it merged into the German Transport Workers' Union.

== Presidents ==
1898: Albert Störmer
1900: Paul Müller
