= Viani =

Viani is an Italian surname. Notable people with the surname include:

- Alan Viani, American labor leader
- Antonio Maria Viani (born c. 1540), Italian Renaissance painter and carver
- Domenico Maria Viani (1668–1711), Italian Baroque painter
- Giorgio Viani (1762-1816), Italian writer and numismatist
- Giovanni Maria Viani (1636–1700), Italian Baroque painter
- Giuseppe Viani (1909–1969), Italian footballer and manager
- Julianne Viani-Braen, American broadcaster for the YES network
- Osvaldo Gnocchi-Viani (1837–1917), Italian journalist and a member of the First International
- Riccardo Vianello Raimondo Viani (1922-2010), Italian actor, comedian and television host
- Serafino Viani (1768 – 1803), Italian painter and patriot from Reggio Emilia
