= General Union of Public Sector and Transport Workers =

- Gesamtverband der Arbeitnehmer der öffentlichen Betriebe und des Personen- und Warenverkehrs
- Predecessor: German Transport Workers' Union; Union of Gardeners and Nursery Workers; Union of German Professional Firefighters; Union of Municipal and State Workers
- Successor: Industrial Union of Trade and Transport (E Germany), Public Services, Transport and Traffic Union (W Germany)
- Founded: 1 January 1930
- Dissolved: May 1933
- Headquarters: 1/2 Michaelkirchplatz, Berlin
- Location: Germany
- Members: 700,000 (1930)
- Publication: Gewerkschaft
- Affiliations: ADGB, ITF, PSI

The General Union of Public Sector and Transport Workers (German: Gesamtverband der Arbeitnehmer der öffentlichen Betriebe und des Personen- und Warenverkehrs, GV) was a trade union representing workers in various industries in Germany.

== History ==
=== Formation ===
The German Transport Workers' Union and the Union of Municipal and State Workers were both affiliates of the General German Trade Union Confederation (ADGB), but the two frequently came into dispute as to which union should represent groups of workers, such as tram workers who were employed by local municipalities. Oswald Schumann, of the transport workers' union, believed that the best resolution to these disputes was for the two unions to merge, and in 1925 he initiated discussions between the two unions, and also the United Union of German Railway Workers.

By 1928, discussions were well advanced, but the railway workers' union was concerned that a new union would be dominated by the municipal and state workers, and withdrew from the negotiations. In July 1929, the two unions agreed, in principle, to merge. The small Union of Gardeners and Nursery Workers only represented workers in the private sector, and also agreed to be part of the merger, in order to establish a stronger section representing gardeners in both private and public sectors. In October 1929, a congress was held, to finalise the arrangements for the merger. In December, the Union of German Professional Firefighters also voted in favour of joining: however, the Communist Party of Germany (KPD), which was influential in that union, opposed the merger, its supporters instead transferred to the German Civil Service Federation.

=== Operations ===
The new union was officially created on 1 January 1930. It was jointly led by Schumann and Fritz Müntner. Like all its predecessors, it affiliated to the ADGB, and it also affiliated to the International Transport Workers' Federation, and the International Federation of Employees in Public Services. It was the second largest affiliate of the ADGB, with about 700,000 members, organised in six sections:

Section	Trades
A	Municipal administration, gas, electric, water, healthcare, gardening, parks, cemeteries, firefighting
B	Civil service, theatre, cinema
C	Commerce, transport
D	Trams, port transport, private transport
E	Post, telegraphy
F	Shipping, inland navigation, port operations, hydraulic engineering

The union was based in Berlin and published the Gewerkschaft journal, plus five journals for workers in specific trades. The Film Union merged into the union in 1930, and at the start of 1932, the Union of Hairdressers and Assistants also joined.

The transport workers' union had been constructing a new headquarters for several years, with costs and time overrunning. By 1931, Schumann was still unable to present a final cost estimate, and controversy over this led him to resign in November 1932. Müntner had been suffering from increasingly poor health, and resigned at the same time, the two being replaced by Otto Becker and Toni Reißner. It was also discovered that treasurer Richard Nürnberg and cashier Adam Ruppert had invested money without board approval, and they were sacked, with August Reitz appointed as the new treasurer. In order to save money, the number of board members was also reduced.

=== Under the Nazi government ===
The Nazis came to power in January 1933. Becker engaged in talks with the Nazis, to explore whether he could prevent a ban on trade unions. This proved highly controversial. Reißner was active in the Social Democratic Party of Germany (SPD) and had been active in anti-fascist activities, investigating the potential of collaborating with the KPD to oppose the Nazi government. Reißner was arrested in April, and took leave from the union, intending to resign in protest at attempts to negotiate with the Nazis, while secretary of the executive Carl Polenske did resign. At the start of May all trade unions were banned, and Becker was taken into custody, concluding that it was not possible to organise underground trade union work, while Reißner was later able to emigrate to the Netherlands and organised trade union activity among other workers who had escaped the Nazis.

After World War II, trade unions were re-established on a reorganised basis. The Public Services, Transport and Traffic Union was the main successor to the Union of Public Sector and Transport Workers, but communication and commercial workers were placed in other unions.

== Leadership ==
=== Presidents ===
1930: Fritz Müntner and Otto Schumann
1932: Otto Becker and Anton "Toni" Reißner

=== Secretaries ===
1930: Anton "Toni" Reißner
1932: Carl Polenske

=== Treasurers ===
1930: Richard Nürnberg
1932: August Reitz
