= Stanley Hill (union official) =

American labor organizer (1936–2019)

Stanley Weldon Hill (September 24, 1936 – January 25, 2019) was an American labor organizer born in The Bronx, New York City. He succeeded Victor Gotbaum as executive director of District Council 37 of the American Federation of State, County, and Municipal Employees (AFSCME), serving from 1987 to 1998. In 1988 he served as New York co-chair of Jesse Jackson's presidential campaign.

Hill resigned from his post in 1998 following numerous allegations of misuse of union funds.

Hill died in Queens, New York City, in 2019 from pneumonia at the age of 82.

== Early life ==
Hill was born in the South Bronx and grew up on the Lower East Side. His father, Merton, was a mechanic. He played basketball for the High School of Commerce in Manhattan and for Iona College.
