= NBPO =

NBPO may refer to:

- Dutch Union of Personnel in Government Service, a former Dutch trade union
- New Blue Party of Ontario, a political party in Ontario
