= General German Civil Service Federation =

The General German Civil Service Federation (German: Allgemeiner Deutscher Beamtenbund, ADB) was a trade union representing civil servants in Germany.

In 1922, the German Civil Service Federation (DBB) opposed a strike by railway workers. In protest, the federation's more left-wing affiliates left and on 8 June founded the "General German Civil Service Federation". The new federation soon negotiated a partnership agreement with the General German Trade Union Federation, and the AfA-Bund. It also worked closely with the Social Democratic Party of Germany (SPD), but because some SPD supporters remained part of the DBB, the SPD only recognised the new federation in 1930.

The federation was led by Albert Falkenberg and published the journal Mitteilungsblatt der Gewerkschaflichen Beamtenzentrale. From 1925, it was affiliated to the International Federation of Civil Servants.

Membership of the federation was initially 350,000 but, due to reductions of the size of the German civil service, by 1932, it was down to 171,000. Once a Nazi government was elected, the federation anticipated that it would be banned, and so pre-empted this by dissolving, on 6 April 1933.

As of 1928, the following unions were affiliated to the ADB, some only in respect of part of their membership:

- Central Union of Employees
- Central Union of Machinists and Stokers
- General German Postal Union
- German Musicians' Union
- General Union of German Bank Employees
- German Foremen's Union
- German Workers' Union
- National Union of German Administrative Officials
- National Union of German Municipal Officials
- Union of Administrative Officials
- Union of German Judicial and Criminal Justice Officials
- Union of German Professional Firefighters
- Union of German Teachers
- Union of Municipal and State Workers
- Union of Prison, Criminal Police, and Educational Officials
- Union of Saxon State Officials
- Union of Technical Employees and Officials
- Union of Thuringian Police Officers
- United Union of German Railway Workers
