= Albin Mohs =

German trade union leader

Albin Mohs (1867 – 1925) was a German trade union leader.

Mohs was born on 16 May 1867 in Leipzig, Kingdom of Saxony. He became a woodturner, and joined the Union of Woodturners of Germany. From 1889, he chaired its Leipzig branch. In 1893, the Woodturners merged with several other unions, to form the German Woodworkers' Union. He opposed this, and soon afterwards lost his job. He found work as a journalist on the Leipziger Volkszeitung, and also served as president of the Leipzig trades council.

In 1898, Mohs moved to Berlin, where he helped form a union representing butchers. From 1900, he was the editor of the union newspaper, Fleischer, then in 1902, he began working full-time in the office of the Union of Municipal and State Workers (VGS). The union's membership among gas workers had fallen dramatically, but Mohs was able to reverse this. He then spent the first half of 1903 editing the union's newspaper, and in April was appointed as one of five members of the union's executive. He was given responsibility for constructing a new union headquarters, in Leipzig, and was appointed as regional secretary for most of southern Germany, developing new branches in the Rhineland.

In 1905, Mohs was appointed as vice president of the union, and also secretary to its executive board. At the end of 1905, he became acting president, when Bruno Poersch resigned, and in April 1906, he was elected to the office on a permanent basis. In contrast to Poersch, he was willing to make concessions in demarcation disputes with other unions, something which proved controversial within the VGS. Mohs also championed the formation of an international trade secretariat to represent public sector workers. He organised a conference in 1907 which formed the International Secretariat of the Workers in Public Services (PSI), and he became its general secretary.

Under Mohs' leadership, the VGS grew, recruiting new members, and also persuading some local unions to join. However, he remained unpopular with the union's board, and in 1909, he was defeated in a vote for re-election by Richard Heckmann, 26 votes to 25. Because of the closeness of the vote, Heckmann refused to take up the post, and Mohs remained in office. At the next vote, in 1912, he defeated Emil Wutzky only by 43 votes to 42.

Mohs was also active in the Social Democratic Party of Germany (SPD), serving as vice president of its Schöneberg branch from 1910 to 1913, and unsuccessfully standing for Schöneberg City Council in 1910. In 1913, he won election to the Greater Berlin council.

By 1914, the PSI had sufficient funds to pay for a full-time general secretary. Mohs was given the role, standing down as leader of the VGS, allowing Heckmann to take over. With the outbreak of World War I soon afterwards, Heckmann argued that the PSI should be abolished, and Mohs could return to his old post as leader of the union's southern district. However, Mohs persuaded a majority of PSI affiliates to support the federation's continued existence.

In February 1915, Mohs suffered a heart attack, and spent the remainder of the year recuperating. With the PSI no longer able to pay a full-time salary, he filled the role part-time, and also became editor of the Correspondenzblatts der Generalkommission der Gewerkschaften Deutschlands and the Gewerkschaftlichen Frauenzeitung. The VGS left the PSI at the start of 1917, but Mohs remained in post, and persuaded the union to rejoin in 1919. He then retired from the international position, and won election as a district councillor in Schöneberg, with responsibility for the local employment office. He retired at the start of 1925, and died in March from heart failure.

He died 20 March 1925.

Trade union offices
Preceded by Bruno Poersch	President of the Union of Municipal and State Workers; 1906–1914	Succeeded by Richard Heckmann
Preceded by New position	General Secretary of the International Secretariat of the Workers in Public Services; 1907–1919	Succeeded by Nico van Hinte
