= Heinz Kluncker =

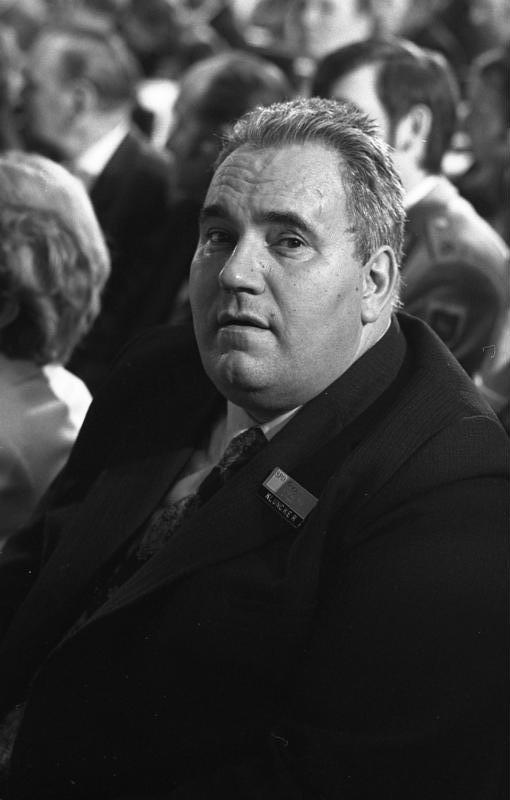
Heinz Kluncker, 1973

Heinz Kluncker (February 20, 1925 (Wuppertal) – April 21, 2005 (Stuttgart)) was president of the German trade union ÖTV (Öffentliche Dienste, Transport und Verkehr Public service, transport and traffic) from 1964 to 1982.

Kluncker was conscripted into the German Army in 1943. In 1944 he deserted in France and became prisoner of war. He returned to Germany in 1946.

He was a member of the SPD (Sozialdemokratischen Partei Deutschlands Social-democratic party of Germany) since 1946.

Trade union offices
Preceded by Adolph Kummernuss	President of the Public Services, Transport and Traffic Union; 1964–1982	Succeeded by Monika Wulf-Mathies
Preceded by Gunnar Hallström	President of the Public Services International; 1973–1985	Succeeded by Victor Gotbaum
