= F. S. Noordhoff =

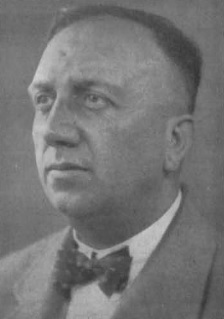
Franciscus Siebren Noordhoff

Franciscus Siebren Noordhoff (7 June 1882 – 20 April 1970) was a Dutch trade unionist and politician.

Born in The Hague, Noordhooff grew up in Leeuwarden and Sneek. Although his family were of Frisian origin, his father banned him from learning the Frisian language. In his spare time, he trained as an economist, and worked for the government in a variety of posts. While based in Arnhem, he joined both the Social Democratic Workers' Party (SDAP) and the General Dutch Civil Servants' Union (ANAB).

Noordhoff began working for the ANAB in 1910, as the volunteer editor of its journal, the De Ambtenaar, then became the union's full-time secretary. Because of inflation during World War I, he led a broad coalition demanding increased wages for civil servants. This made him favour a merger with the other unions of civil servants affiliated to the Dutch Confederation of Trade Unions (NVV). In 1919, this produced the Central Dutch Union of Civil Servants (CNAB), and Noordhoff became its first president. He also became secretary of the Committee for the Promotion of the General Interests of Government Employees. In 1925, he was elected as the founding general secretary of the International Federation of Civil Servants.

Outside trade unionism, Noordhoff developed a theory that modern wars were oil wars, and he wrote extensively on the subject. In 1923/24, he served on the council in Baarn. He was a founder of the Institute for Workers' Development, and chaired it from 1932 until 1935. He was the secretary of the Military Commission, which aimed to decide on the SDAP's approach to future wars, and on it, he took a pacifist position.

In 1930, Noordhoff left the ANAB to join the executive of the NVV, and moved to Haarlem. From 1931, he devoted much of his time to chairing the General Council for Health Insurance, but it was dissolved in 1934. From 1934, he served on the council of the Dutch Association to Abolish Alcoholic Beverages, and chaired it from 1936. From 1935, he served on Haarlem's city council. In the late 1930s, he served on several government commissions.

Noordhoff rejected an opportunity to flee to England at the start the Nazi occupation of the Netherlands. Along with the rest of the NVV's executive, he was dismissed in 1940, and the following year, Haarlem's council was dissolved. He found work in health insurance, and maintained contact with other former leading figures in the NVV. After the war, he became vice-chair of the Honour Council which adjudicated which NVV members had collaborated too closely with the Nazis, and should therefore not be permitted to return to their posts. He briefly served as an alderman in Haarlem, and then in 1949 briefly became a councillor again. He also helped work on plans for the national social security system. After his retirement, he was chair of the De Blinkert organisation for the elderly.

Trade union offices
Preceded by New position	President of the Central Dutch Union of Civil Servants; 1919–1930	Succeeded by W. C. Luberti
Preceded by New position	General Secretary of the International Federation of Civil Servants; 1925–1930	Succeeded by Charles Laurent
