= Charles Laurent =

French trade unionist (1879–1965)

Charles Louis Laurent (18 March 1879 – 10 July 1965) was a French trade union leader.

From 1899, Laurent worked for the Deposits and Consignments Fund, eventually rising to become office manager. He became interested in trade unionism, and in 1908 he established a loose federation of civil servants. It had 140,000 on its launch, and 228,000 the following year. It led a strike in the postal service that year, and this convinced Laurent to reform the body as the more formal Civil Servants' Federation, becoming its general secretary.

The federation was able to sustain its membership, around half of whom were schoolteachers. In 1913, Laurent launched a union journal. Although the federation was forced to stop operations at the start of World War I, Laurent revived it in 1917. From 1915 to 1918, he served as a captain in the army, but remained based in Paris.

In 1920, Laurent took the federation into the General Confederation of Labour (CGT). In 1922, he was laid off from his government job, and began working full-time for the union. In 1924, the government raided the union's offices in the hope of discovering evidence of fraud, but there was none, and this led Laurent into opposition to the National Bloc.

From 1925 until 1940, Laurent served on the National Economic Council. He also served on the executive of the CGT from 1927, and as secretary of the International Federation of Civil Servants from 1931, then of its successor, the International Federation of Employees in Public and Civil Services. Although he opposed the communists, he accepted them into the union in 1937, remaining its leader.

Laurent opposed the Vichy government, later moving to London and serving on the National Council of the Resistance, then on the Provisional Consultative Assembly. In 1946, he left his trade union posts, being nominated by the CGT as the government commissioner for the banque de l’Union parisienne.

Laurent retired in 1963 and died two years later. He was awarded the Légion d’honneur.

Trade union offices
Preceded by New position	General Secretary of the Civil Servants' Federation; 1909–1946	Succeeded by Alain Le Léap
Preceded by F. S. Noordhoff	General Secretary of the International Federation of Civil Servants; 1931–1935	Succeeded by Union merged
Preceded by Ernest Michaud	General Secretary of the International Federation of Employees in Public and Civil Services; 1935–1945; With: Ernest Michaud (1935–1937)	Succeeded by Maarten Bolle
