= Fritz Müntner =

German trade union leader

Fritz Müntner (6 November 1870 – 31 March 1934) was a German trade union leader.

Born in Wriezen, Müntner completed an apprenticeship as a saddler and travelled extensively in his journeyman years, before settling in Berlin in 1894. He joined the Union of Saddlers of Germany and also the Social Democratic Party of Germany (SPD). From 1902, he began working full-time for the union, running its health insurance scheme in Berlin. In 1905/06, he served as the SPD secretary in Rixdorf.

Müntner became known for his strong administrative skills, and in 1906 was elected as national treasurer of his union. He actively supported its merger into the Union of Saddlers and Portfolio Makers in 1909, and then became the editor of the new union's journal, Sattler- und Portefeuiller-Zeitung. However, he felt that the union was being badly run and resigned in 1911. He found work as the Leipzig district leader of the Union of Municipal and State Workers, where he soon overcame resistance to the appointment of someone from outside the union. In 1912, he was instead appointed as chair of the union's Greater Berlin district, although he did not take up the post until 1914. In the role, he focused on supporting the relatives of members who had been called up to fight in World War I, and also served on the city's Nutrition Committee. He also negotiated a maximum eight-hour working day for most city workers.

After the November Revolution, union membership in Berlin grew rapidly, but Müntner faced criticism from the left wing of the union for having supported the war effort. Despite this, in 1919, he was elected as national vice president of the union. In 1920, the union's president resigned, and Müntner was appointed to replace him. That year, he was also elected to Berlin City Council.

As leader of the union, Müntner served on the Provisional National Economic Council, and the executive of the General German Trade Union Confederation (ADGB). He advocated compulsory arbitration in disputes and a national eight-hour working day, and argued against resistance to the Occupation of the Ruhr.

In 1929, Müntner was elected as general secretary of the International Federation of Employees in Public Services. He immediately organised an international congress of energy workers, to campaign against privatisation, but thereafter struggled to achieve much in the role, as the federation's finances worsened. This financial struggle also affected the Union of Municipal and State Workers, and Müntner arranged for it to merge with several other unions to form the General Union of Public Sector and Transport Workers (GV); he became its joint president.

Just before the union merger, Müntner became seriously ill with heart problems. He recovered sufficiently to become the auditor of the ADGB in 1931, but retired from all his trade union posts in October 1932. GV was banned in 1933, and Müntner had to leave his union-owned apartment. He died the following year.

Trade union offices
Preceded by Richard Heckmann	President of the Union of Municipal and State Workers; 1920–1929	Succeeded by Union merged
Preceded by New position	President of the General Union of Public Sector and Transport Workers; 1930–1932; With: Otto Schumann	Succeeded by Otto Becker and Toni Reißner
Preceded by Nico van Hinte	General Secretary of the International Federation of Employees in Public Services; 1929–1932	Succeeded by Ludwig Maier
