= Alan Viani =

American union official

Alan Viani was head of the Department of Research and Negotiations at DC37, the largest municipal union in New York City, from 1973 to 1985. He was intimately involved in the negotiations to resolve the 1975 New York City fiscal crisis. He was later involved with resolving the 2005 NYC transit strike. In 2024 he served as the Mediator that resolved a 13-year unsettled collective bargaining agreement between the City of NY and the Marine Engineers Beneficial Association covering the Staten Island Ferry Boat Captains and crews.

In 1965, Viani, as President of Local 371, AFSCME, led a strike by over eight thousand workers for the New York City Department of Welfare. He was the first Union leader to be jailed by the City of NY for violating the NY State Condon-Wadlin Act. He served 12 days in jail during that strike but, nonetheless, the strike was largely successful, as it led to a clear statement of the rights of city employees to collective bargaining. It also led to the appointment of Victor Gotbaum as DC37's Executive Director.

Viani was later an assistant to DC37's Department of Research & Negotiations head, Daniel Nelson, and took over the position after Nelson's death in 1973. He was DC37's lead negotiator in this role until 1985, when he joined the New York City Office of Collective Bargaining.

In 1993, he retired to become a mediator and arbitrator. In 2005, Viani was part of a three-member mediation team that helped the two sides to resolve their differences in the 2005 New York transit strike.

In 2015, Viani was appointed as a neutral member to the New York City Board of Collective Bargaining.
