= Gunnar Hallström =

Swedish trade unionist and politician

Hans Gunnar Fredrik Hallström (5 January 1910 – 29 June 1989) was a Swedish trade unionist and politician.

Hallström joined the Swedish Social Democratic Youth League in 1927, remaining active in it until 1936. He then became leader of the Malmö branch of the Swedish Municipal Workers' Union (Kommunal), and was elected to the city council. In 1948, he was elected as president of Kommunal, serving until 1973, also serving on the committee of the Swedish Trade Union Confederation. In 1964, he was also elected as president of the Public Services International. He retired in 1973.

Trade union offices
Preceded by Peter Söderberg	President of the Swedish Municipal Workers' Union; 1948–1973	Succeeded by Bengt Blomdahl
Preceded by Adolph Kummernuss	President of the Public Services International; 1964–1973	Succeeded by Heinz Kluncker
