= Union of German Professional Firefighters =

- Verband Deutscher Berufsfeuerwehrmänner
- Merged into: General Union of Public Sector and Transport Workers
- Founded: 1 October 1908
- Dissolved: December 31, 1929
- Location: Germany
- Publication: Der Berufsfeuerwehrmann
- Affiliations: ADGB

The Union of German Professional Firefighters (German: Verband Deutscher Berufsfeuerwehrmänner) was a trade union representing firefighters in Germany.

The union was founded on 1 October 1908, at a meeting in Dortmund. It published the journal Der Berufsfeuerwehrmann. While the union was not affiliated to the General Commission of German Trade Unions or any other federation, most of its officials were members of the Social Democratic Party of Germany, while the Berlin region became increasingly dominated by members of the Communist Party of Germany (KPD) and Independent Social Democratic Party of Germany. By 1920, the union had 9,470 members, which represented more than 90% of eligible workers. In 1921, the union affiliated to the General German Trade Union Federation. In 1922, it also affiliated to the related General German Civil Service Federation.

By 1924, the union's leadership was concerned that it was too small to survive in the long-term. It proposed a merger into the Union of Municipal and State Workers (VGS), but this was rejected on a split 22-22 delegate vote. This led the opposition, led by the KPD but also including German nationalists, to propose a 1925 vote of no confidence in the union's leadership, but this too was lost.

In 1929, the VGS was finalising a merger which was to form the General Union of Public Sector and Transport Workers. The firefighters voted in favour of joining the new union, completing the merger on 1 January 1930. However, much of the KPD opposition refused to join the new union, instead transferring to the German Civil Service Federation.

== Presidents ==
1908: Max Laaser
1919: Max Neumann
1922: Hans Weilmaier
1926: Erich Grollmus
