= Carol Gotbaum =

South African air traveler

Carol Anne Gotbaum was a South African-born air traveler who died, at age 45, on September 28, 2007 in Phoenix, Arizona in Sky Harbor International Airport while being held in police custody. She was arrested after becoming angry while attempting to board her plane to enter an alcohol treatment center in Tucson, Arizona.

== The incident ==
Gotbaum was unable to board her flight, as it had been overbooked. After being denied passage on a later flight, Gotbaum became irate; reviews of publicly available closed-circuit security tapes shows her lurching about and flailing, as well as hurling a PDA device at a U.S. Airways employee. Several passengers subsequently claimed they attempted to switch seats so she could make her flight, but were dissuaded by employees of the airline, U.S. Airways but there is no information available to verify this.

Soon after the assault with the PDA, security officers were called and Gotbaum was arrested. According to Phoenix police, as she was taken away, Gotbaum was irate and continued to scream. She was subsequently handcuffed to a bench and left in a holding cell for five to ten minutes. Police state they did not check on her when she was screaming, but became concerned when she stopped. When authorities later checked on her, they found Gotbaum dead.

== Later controversy ==
The story of Gotbaum's death became national headline news, and newspapers across the country speculated as to what had actually happened. Most reports stated simply that she had been late in arriving for her flight, although this was changed in later news stories. The Gotbaum family announced its intention to investigate and potentially sue the police pending an autopsy, which they hired a representative to attend. Police officials say that officers acted justly and according to protocol. The Maricopa County Medical Examiner found Gotbaum accidentally strangled herself and ruled her death an accident. The report states she was acutely intoxicated on alcohol and prescription medication at the time of her death. These medicines included the antidepressants Citalopram and Duloxetine, as well as the antitussive Dextromethorphan and the antihistamines Diphenhydramine and Chlorpheniramine. Her blood alcohol content was .24 — three times the legal driving limit in Arizona.

Cyril Wecht, a pathologist hired by the Gotbaum family, agreed with the Medical Examiner's assessment of death by asphyxiation but argued that Gotbaum's condition should have been better assessed by the Phoenix police when they initially encountered her and appropriate medical personnel should have been contacted. A spokesman for the Phoenix police stated there was no way the Phoenix authorities could have known about Gotbaum's health problems and that the police department had acted appropriately.

== Lawsuit ==
On March 27, 2008, the family of Gotbaum announced it would file a claim for $8 million against the city of Phoenix and its police department. A lawsuit was filed May 8, 2008. On August 21, 2008, the Maricopa County Attorney determined that the Phoenix police officers involved in the arrest of Carol Gotbaum did not break any laws and will not be prosecuted.

On October 19, 2009, it was announced that the city of Phoenix and the Phoenix Police Department would provide a $250,000 settlement to Gotbaum's family, in which Gotbaum's children would become the beneficiaries. A news release provided the Phoenix Police Department indicated the police department and the city decided to settle due to the expenses (at least $750,000) associated with taking the case to trial.

== Biography ==
A native of Cape Town, South Africa, Carol Gotbaum was born Carol Anne Stiger. She had three sisters: Geraldine, Heidi and Patricia. Their father, Naval Officer, Commander (retired) Henry Brian Stiger, to whom Carol was particularly close, died of lymphoma in 2006. She left South Africa after earning an MBA from the University of the Witwatersrand in Johannesburg. She moved to London where she worked for Harrods and House of Fraser before relocating to the United States, where she married Noah Eliot Gotbaum (the son of Victor and Sarah Gotbaum) on June 10, 1995 at the Loeb Boathouse in Manhattan, and with whom she had three children.
