= General Union of Civil Servants =

The General Union of Civil Servants (Dutch: Algemene Bond van Ambtenaren, ABVA) was a trade union representing civil servants, including postal and telecommunication workers, in the Netherlands.

The union was founded in 1947, when the Central Dutch Union of Civil Servants merged with the Dutch Union of Personnel in Government Service. Like both its predecessors, it affiliated to the Dutch Confederation of Trade Unions (NVV).

By 1980, the union had 209,014 members, of whom, 40% worked in administration, 22% in healthcare, 13% in communication, 7% in utilities, 6% in education, and the remainder in a wide variety of areas. In 1982, it merged with the rival Catholic Union of Government Personnel (KABO), to form Abvakabo.

== Presidents ==
1947: Nico Vijlbrief
1949: Jaap Blom
1958: Arie van Rossen
1970: J. Hoogerwerf
1974: Jaap van Dijck
1976: Jan Dutman
1982: Jaap van de Scheur
