= Paul Tofahrn =

Paul Tofahrn (8 January 1901 – 7 February 1979) was a Belgian and international trade union leader.

== Biography ==
Born in Manderfeld, Tofahrn grew up in Germany, France, Belgium and Italy, as his father moved to find work. During World War I, he worked as an agricultural labourer, then in industry, before finding work on the railways in Losheim. Because he was fluent in both French and German languages, he was able to play a leading role in the transfer of railways in the Eupen-Malmedy region to Belgium. He also joined the Belgian Railwaymen's Union, and took part in its 1923 strike.

For his activism, Tofahrn was sacked, and he instead began working full time for the union. In 1928, he became assistant secretary of the railwaymen's section of the International Transport Workers' Federation (ITF). His language skills saw him working closely with Ernest Bevin, but in 1931 he moved to Zürich to take a research post with the International Federation of Food and Drink Workers. He returned to Belgium in 1934, and became regional secretary of the Belgian Labour Party in the Tournai area. He proved successful, and became the party's acting general secretary, but the position was not made permanent, and so in November 1938 he returned to the ITF, now as secretary of the railwaymen's section.

Tofahrn moved to Paris in 1939, and London in 1940, to avoid the Nazi advances, and keep the ITF operating. In 1943, he was appointed as Assistant General Secretary of the ITF, remaining in post under Jaap Oldenbroek and then Omer Becu, despite frequent disagreements with both. In 1955, he resigned, to become General Secretary of the International Federation of Employees in Public and Civil Services. As leader, he focused on liaising with the International Labour Organization, and encouraging the growth of trade unions in Africa, Asia and Latin America.

Tofahrn had a heart attack in 1962, and took six months off work, but later returned and retired only in 1968. He then served as a governor of two schools in Southwark, and served on the executive of the Pedestrians' Association.

Trade union offices
Preceded by Jaap Oldenbroek	Assistant General Secretary of the International Transport Workers' Federation; 1943–1955	Succeeded by ?
Preceded by Jaap Blom	General Secretary of the International Federation of Employees in Public and Civil Services; 1955–1968	Succeeded by Werner Barazetti
