= Peter Waldorff =

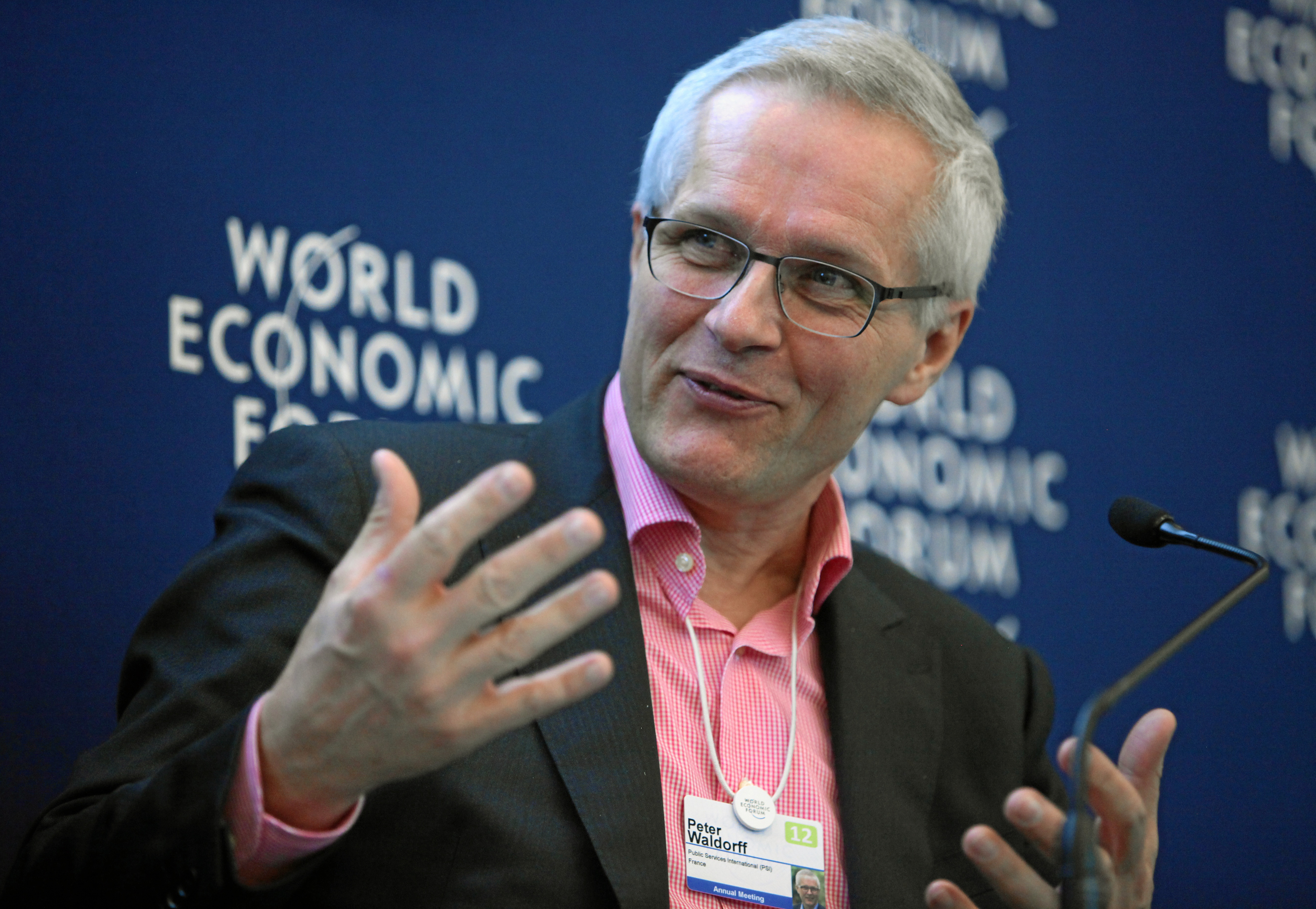
- Waldorff at the World Economic Forum annual meeting in 2012
- Born: August 4, 1955

Peter Waldorff, 2007-2012 General Secretary of PSI Public Services International. He was born in 1955 and is Danish, married with Tina Waldorff and having two grown up children. He was elected as General Secretary of Public Services International during the 28th Congress in Vienna, Austria on 24–28 September 2007, his mandate ended in November 2012 when he was not re-elected at the 29th Congress in Durban. 2011-2013 Chair of The Council of Global Unions.

Previous to his election, Peter was President of HK/Stat the trade union for Government and Public Employees in Denmark from 1998 to 2007, and in that capacity, he was already an active member of the PSI Executive Board and the EPSU Executive Committee.

In Denmark, Peter had several other mandates in trade union organisations and pension funds. His trade union activity started in 1975 when he was a youth activist in the HK union, and he went from strength to strength, becoming youth secretary in 1981, then in 1986 collective bargaining officer for the HK/State Sector. From 1992 to 1998, he was Head of Secretariat of HK/Stat.

Peter worked for eight years in the municipality of Lyngby-Taarbaek, north of Copenhagen, where he was also shop steward. His work there was mainly in the tax department, and he spent the last year in the department for child day care. His formal education was in the area of local government and further training combined with courses in economics, languages, management, ICT and organisational development.

Peter’s achievements in the collective bargaining sphere include obtaining binding agreements for state sector employees, enabling them to develop their competences and take on more demanding positions. He was also involved in the 2005 agreement to set up so-called integration positions targeted at persons with a non-Danish ethnical background (immigrants and their descendants) who experience difficulties accessing the labour market.

Peter is convinced that Quality Public Services is vital fighting growing inequality. He also underlines the importance of collective bargaining, which is a vital tool for unions everywhere to achieve decent working conditions.

Trade union offices
Preceded by Hans Engelberts	General Secretary of the Public Services International; 2007–2012	Succeeded by Rosa Pavanelli
