= German Transport Workers' Union =

Former German Reich trade union (1897–1929)

- Deutsche Transportarbeiter-Verband
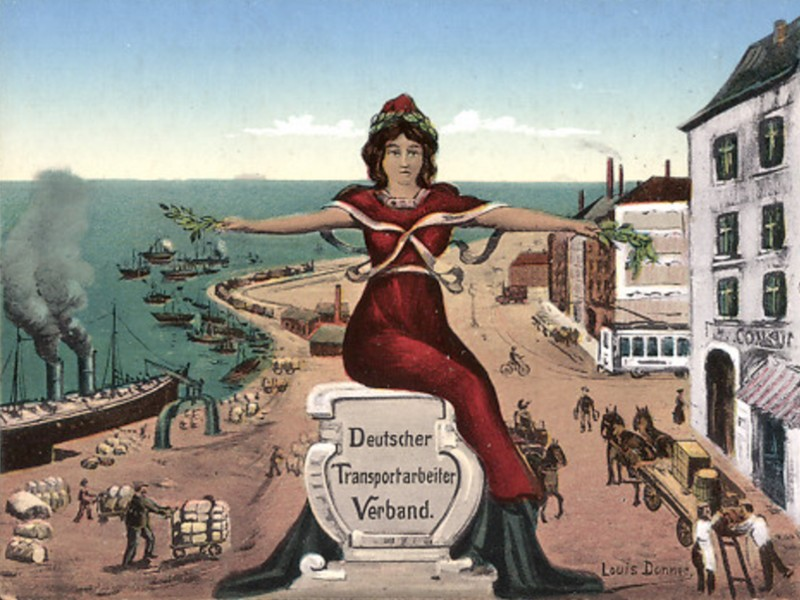
- Merged into: General Union of Public Sector and Transport Workers
- Founded: 1 January 1897
- Dissolved: December 31, 1929
- Headquarters: Berlin
- Location: Germany
- Members: 582,000 (1922)
- Publication: Deutscher Verkehrsbund
- Affiliations: ADGB, ITF

The German Transport Workers' Union (German: Deutscher Transportarbeiter-Verband, DTV) was a trade union representing transport workers in Germany.

The union was founded in 1897 as the Association of Commercial, Transport and Communication Workers, and it affiliated to the General Commission of German Trade Unions. It grew rapidly, with the German Railway Workers' Union joining in 1908, and the Union of Dockers of Germany and the Central Union of Sailors of Germany both joining in 1910, taking membership to 230,000 by 1913.

Although the Railway Workers disaffiliated in 1916, as the German Railway Union, the DTV embarked on a series of further mergers: with the German Porters' Union in 1919, the Central Union of German Post and Telegraph Staff in 1921, and the Union of Domestic Workers of Germany in 1923. Membership peaked at 582,000 in 1922. After World War I, it affiliated to the new General German Trade Union Confederation. In 1923, it shortened its name to become the German Transport Union.

By 1930, membership had fallen to 390,000, and the union merged with the Union of Municipal and State Workers, the Union of Gardeners and Nursery Workers, and the Union of German Professional Firefighters, to form the General Union of Public Sector and Transport Workers.

Throughout its existence, the union was led by Oswald Schumann.
