= Nico van Hinte =

Dutch trade union leader

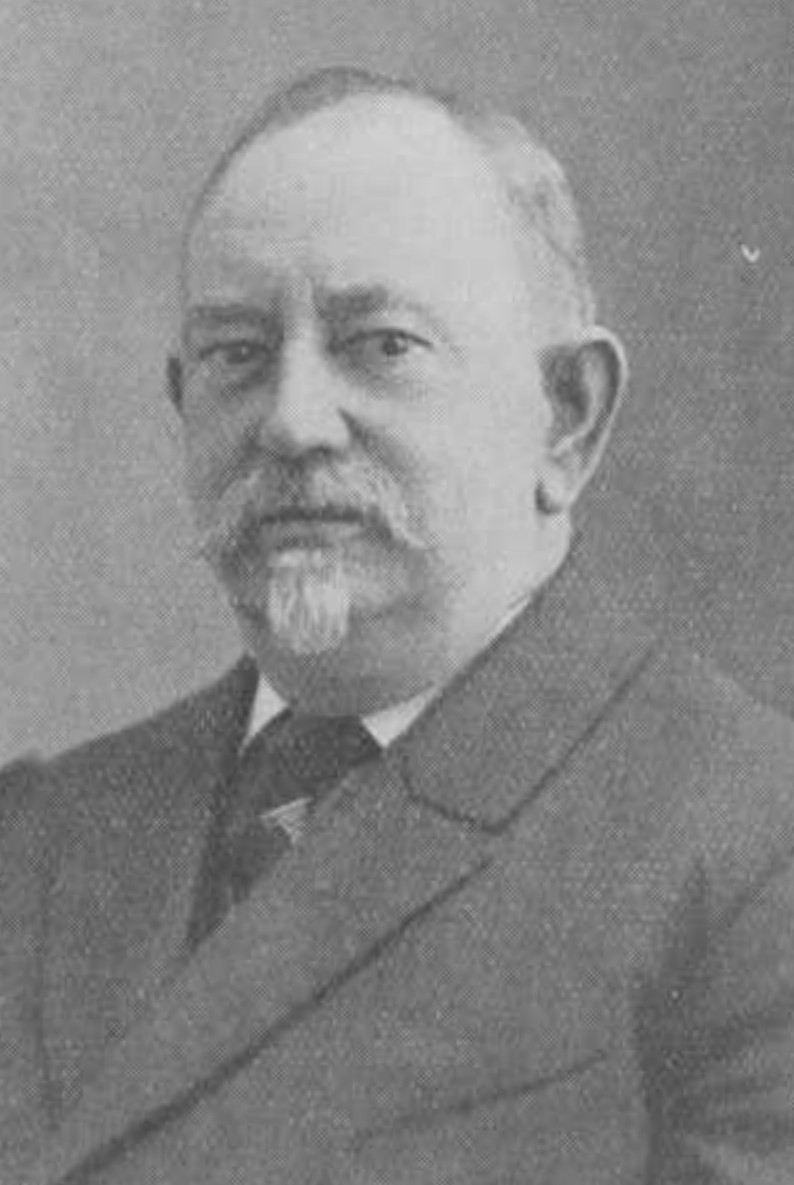
Nico van Hinte

Nicolaas van Hinte (13 July 1869 – 6 November 1932) was a Dutch trade union leader.

Born in Assen, van Hinte followed his father in completing an apprenticeship as a gas fitter. He worked in Dokkum, before moving to Leeuwarden. In 1897, he joined the Social Democratic Workers' Party (SDAP), and joined the editorial board of its Arm Friesland newspaper.

In 1899, van Hinte formed Ons Belang, a union for municipal workers, and also the Leeuwarder Administration Union, which he served as general secretary, and then as president. In 1901, he founded the national Dutch Union of Municipal Workers, similarly becoming its general secretary, and then its president. Under his leadership, it grew from 1,400 members to more than 13,000. Alongside his trade union activities, he campaigned for universal suffrage.

Van Hinte took the union into the new Dutch Confederation of Trade Unions in 1906, it becoming the second largest affiliate, and van Hinte served on the NVV executive. He moved to Rotterdam in 1905, winning a seat on its city council in 1907, then moved to Amsterdam in 1912, serving on the North Holland provincial council.

From 1919, van Hinte was the general secretary of the International Secretariat of the Workers in Public Services. In 1920, he took his union into a merger which formed the Dutch Union of Personnel in Government Service, and he became its first president. In 1928, he suffered a heart attack, leading him to retire in March 1929. He died three years later.

Trade union offices
Preceded by J. G. van Zelm	President of the Dutch Union of Municipal Workers; 1906–1920	Succeeded by Union merged
Preceded by Albin Mohs	General Secretary of the International Secretariat of the Workers in Public Services; 1919–1929	Succeeded by Fritz Müntner
Preceded by New position	President of the Dutch Union of Personnel in Government Service; 1920–1929	Succeeded by Frans van Meurs
