= Central Dutch Union of Civil Servants =

Dutch trade union

The Central Dutch Union of Civil Servants (Dutch: Centrale Nederlandsche Ambtenaarsbond, CNAB) was a trade union representing administrative civil servants in the Netherlands.

The union was founded in 1919, when the General Dutch Union of Civil Servants merged with the General Union of Dutch Post and Telecommunication Personnel, and the Association of State Officials. Like all its predecessors, it affiliated to the Dutch Confederation of Trade Unions (NVV). It had 10,122 members by 1921.

The union was banned under the Nazi occupation during World War II and re-established after the war; by the end of 1945, it had 17,370 members. At the end of the following year, it merged with the Dutch Union of Personnel in Government Service, to form the General Union of Civil Servants.

== Presidents ==
1919: F. S. Noordhoff
1930: W. C. Luberti
