= District Council 37 =

New York City public employee union

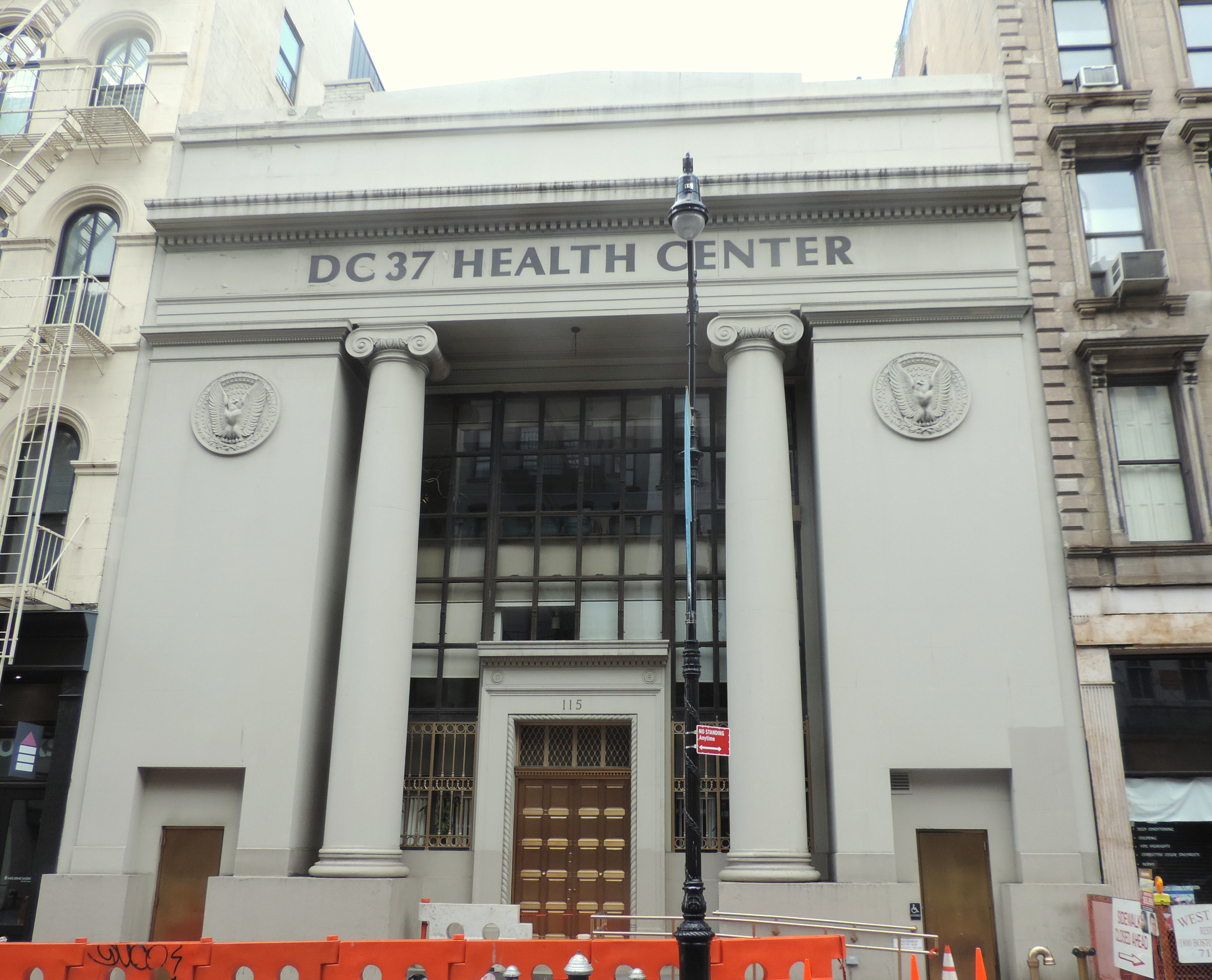
- DC 37 Health Center on Chambers Street.
- Abbreviation: DC37 or DC 37
- Established: 1944; 82 years ago
- Founders: Henry Feinstein
- Type: labor union
- Purpose: public sector employees
- Headquarters: 125 Barclay Street, Tribeca, Manhattan,
- Location: New York City, US
- Coordinates: 40.71470°N 74.01304°W
- Region served: New York City
- Members: over 150,000
- President: Shaun D. Francois I
- Executive Director: Henry Garrido
- Key people: Henry Feinstein, Jerry Wurf, Victor Gotbaum, Stanley Hill
- Parent organization: American Federation of State, County and Municipal Employees (AFSCME)
- Website: dc37.net

District Council 37 (also known as DC 37) is New York City's largest public sector employee union, representing over 150,000 members and 89,000 retirees.

DC 37 was chartered in 1944 by AFSCME to represent public employees in New York City. It was small and relatively unsuccessful under its first president, Henry Feinstein, but under the leadership of Jerry Wurf, who took over as president in 1952, the union grew to 25,000 members by 1957, and 36,000 members in 1962. It also successfully pressured Mayor Robert F. Wagner Jr., to pass executive order 49, which recognized collective bargaining rights for public sector workers.

Wurf became president of AFSCME in 1964 and was replaced later that year by Victor Gotbaum, who was Executive Director of DC 37 until 1987. Under Gotbaum, the union continued to grow in numbers and power.

People who worked closely with Gotbaum included: Lillian Roberts, Associate Director in charge of Organization; Edwin Maher, Associate Director in charge of employees; Daniel Nelson, head of the Department of Research; Julius Topol, DC 37 counsel; Bernard Stephens, editor of the Public Employee Press; and Alan Viani, who took over as head of the Department of Research in 1973 after Nelson's death.

Gotbaum's successor was Stanley Hill, who subsequently resigned in 1998 due to a major scandal in the union. After a trusteeship by AFSCME, Hill was ultimately succeeded in 2002 by Lillian Roberts, who first started working with Gotbaum in 1959.

Roberts retired at the end of 2014. Henry Garrido, who served as Roberts' associate director, was elected Executive Director in January 2015. Garrido, a native of the Dominican Republic, is the first Latino to serve in the position. On Nov. 26, 2024, Garrido was reelected to a fourth term beginning in January 2025.

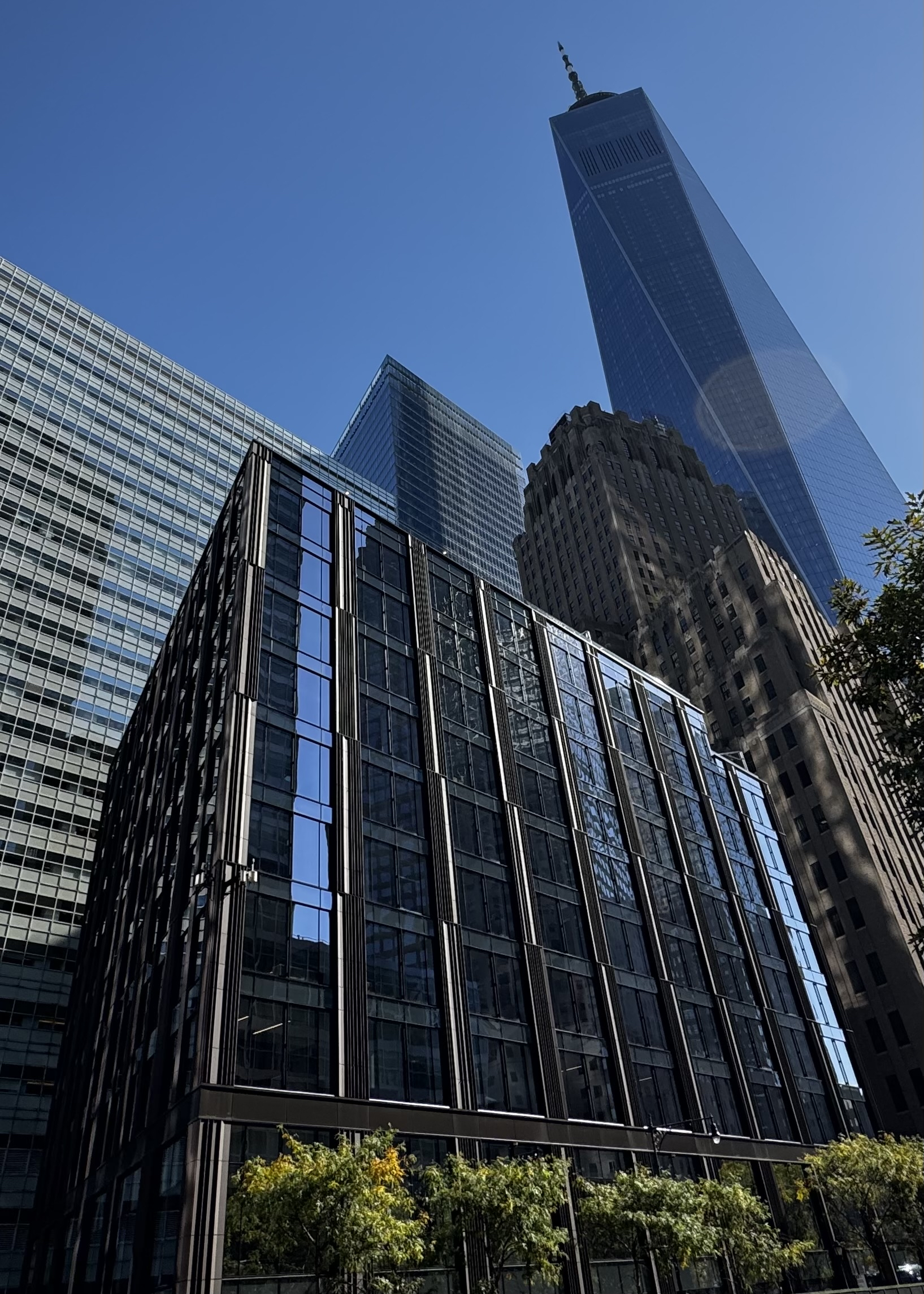
On Oct. 22, 2024, the union reopened its redeveloped, state-of-the-art headquarters at 125 Barclay Street.

On October 26, 2024, the union celebrated the 80th anniversary of receiving its charter from the American Federation of State, County and Municipal Employees (AFSCME) in its newly redeveloped headquarters at 125 Barclay Street in downtown Manhattan.

== Unification with District Council 1707 ==
In 2019, District Council 1707, an AFSCME affiliate representing 20,000 private-sector workers in six local unions across New York City, merged with DC 37 to better serve those workers employed by the city's human services nonprofit organizations.

== See also ==
- Chris Postiglione Triangle, honoring a member of the union
