= Rosa Pavanelli =

Italian trade union leader

- Born: 1955; Brescia, Italy
- Occupation: Trade union leader
- Known for: General Secretary of Public Services International

Rosa Pavanelli is the former General Secretary of Public Services International, the global union federation for public sector trade unions.

== Early life ==
Pavanelli was born in 1955 in Brescia, Italy. She holds a degree in biology from the State University of Milan.

== Trade unions ==
Pavanelli started her trade union activity in 1978 while working with the Ministry of Labour in Brescia. In 1986 she became a member of the secretariat of the trade union Public Function, responsible for the municipal sector, and then for the healthcare sector. She later worked full-time for Italian General Confederation of Labour, becoming regional General Secretary in 1999, and later President of the public sector branch of CGIL. She has also served as Vice President of the European Public Service Union Federation in 2009, and PSI Vice President for the European Region. In November 2012, at the World Congress in Durban, South Africa, she was elected General Secretary of Public Services International-PSI, and later re-elected at Congress in 2017.

In March 2016, Pavanelli was appointed by United Nations Secretary-General Ban Ki-moon to the High-Level Commission on Health Employment and Economic Growth, which was co-chaired by presidents François Hollande of France and Jacob Zuma of South Africa. In January 2024, Pavanelli retired from Public Services International.

In December 2024, she was nominated Chair of the Board of Directors of the Center for Economic and Social Rights.

Trade union offices
Preceded by Peter Waldorff	General Secretary of the Public Services International; 2012–2023	Succeeded by Daniel Bertossa
