= Coalition of Black Trade Unionists =

US nonprofit organization

CBTU
- Coalition of Black Trade Unionists
- Founded: 1972
- Headquarters: Washington, D.C.
- Location: United States
- Key people: Terry Melvin, president
- Affiliations: AFL–CIO
- Website: www.cbtu.org

The Coalition of Black Trade Unionists (CBTU) is a nonprofit organization of African American trade union members affiliated with the AFL–CIO. More than 50 different international and national trade unions are represented in CBTU and there are 50 chapters in the United States and one in Ontario, Canada.

== History ==
CBTU was started in September 1972 when more than 1,200 black union officials and rank and file members from 37 national unions met on September 23–24 at the LaSalle Hotel in Chicago, Illinois, to discuss the role of black trade unionists in the labor movement. At the time, it was the largest single gathering of black unionists in the history of the American labor movement. Five black labor leaders (William Lucy, Nelson Edwards, William Simons, Charles Hayes and Cleveland Robinson) called the new organization the Coalition of Black Trade Unionists.

They believed AFL–CIO President George Meany had been ignoring the voice of black trade unionists. They also believed that the AFL–CIO might attempt to declare its neutrality in the forthcoming U.S. presidential campaign in which President Richard Nixon was seeking re-election. The members of the CBTU thought that the re-election of Richard Nixon would continue hurtful policies to laborers such as unemployment, inflated prices, frozen wages, and appointing judges to the U.S. Supreme Court who did not consider the rights of minorities, workers, and the poor.

Between 35 and 40 percent of the delegates who attended the first meeting were black women. Five of them served on the first executive committee of the CBTU. The CBTU executive council subsequently organized the National Women's Committee, which now holds conferences and workshops.

The CBTU held its first convention in Washington, D.C., in May 1973. There was opposition to the new labor organization. Bayard Rustin claimed that the CPTU was redundant because black trade unionists had already assumed leadership roles in their own unions and communities.

Since its founding, CBTU has been involved in a number of causes including the rights of women workers, promoting black leadership, and bringing attention to human rights issues. In 1974, it was the first labor organization in the United States to pass resolutions for the economic boycott of South Africa in response to its policies of apartheid. CBTU has also passed resolutions highlighting political and human rights issues in Namibia and Zimbabwe.

In 2013, William Lucy left the presidency after 40 years of service to the organization. Terrence (Terry) L. Melvin was elected and became the second president of the CBTU.
