= Lillian Roberts =

American union leader (1928–2026)

Lillian Davis Roberts
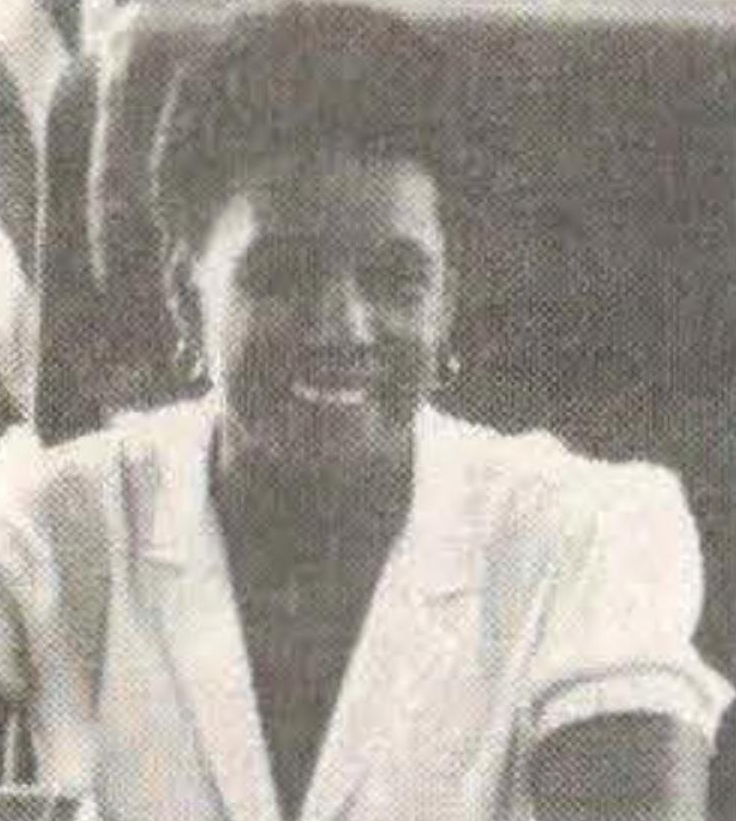
- Roberts c. 1982
- Born: January 2, 1928, Chicago, Illinois
- Died: July 9, 2026, New York, New York
- Citizenship: American
- Occupation: Union leader
- Years active: 1959–1981; 2002–2014
- Employer: AFSCME
- Title: Associate Director of District Council 37; Executive Director of District Council 37
- Movement: Labor

Lillian Davis Roberts (January 2, 1928 – July 9, 2026) was an American union leader who served from 2002 through 2014 as the executive director of District Council 37 (DC37), the largest municipal union in New York City.

== Life and career ==
Roberts was born in Chicago on January 2, 1928 to Lillian and Henry Davis, a couple who migrated to Chicago in 1926 from Mississippi. The second of five children, Roberts won a scholarship to the University of Illinois Urbana Champaign in 1945, but financial difficulties forced her to return home. At age 18, she became a nurse's aide, working for $13 a week at the Chicago Lying-In Clinic.

Roberts was secretary of the University of Chicago Hospital local when she was invited by Victor Gotbaum to join his AFSCME union staff as a full-time organizer in Chicago in 1959. This began a professional relationship between Gotbaum and Roberts that lasted for decades. When Gotbaum became head of DC37, Roberts joined him in New York as a director of hospital field operations, and eventually became Associate Director in charge of organization. During her time as Associate Director, DC37's membership quadrupled to 125,000. In 1969, she led a series of rolling strikes against three hospitals in order to pressure New York Governor Nelson Rockefeller to hold an election for workers to select their representation; she was subsequently jailed for two weeks for defying New York's Taylor Law which prohibits state employees from striking.

In 1981, after events which decreased her power in DC37, she left the union and was appointed New York State Industrial Commissioner, the first black woman to hold such a high post in New York. From 1987 to 1992, she was senior vice president of Total Health Systems, an HMO. DC37 was involved in a major scandal in the late 1990s, and Roberts's return to DC37 as executive director in 2002 was seen, as noted in Roberts's words, as a return to that "old time religion". She retired at the end of 2014 and was succeeded by her associate Henry Garrido.

Roberts received the AFSCME Lifetime Achievement Award in 2014. In 2023, AFSCME established the Lillian Roberts Endowed Scholarship for union members and their children studying at School of Labor and Union Studies at the City University of New York.

Roberts died in Manhattan on July 9, 2026, at the age of 98.
