= Union of Gardeners and Nursery Workers =

Former German Reich trade union (1890–1929)

- Verband der Gärtner und Gärtnereiarbeiter
- Merged into: General Union of Public Sector and Transport Workers
- Founded: 20 August 1890
- Dissolved: December 31, 1929
- Location: Germany
- Publication: Gärtnereifachblatt
- Affiliations: ADGB

The Union of Gardeners and Nursery Workers (German: Verband der Gärtner und Gärtnereiarbeiter) was a trade union representing gardeners, horticultural workers, and flower arrangers in Germany.

The union was founded in 1890 as the General German Gardeners' Union, a social democratic union, based in Berlin. In 1904, it absorbed the non-affiliated German Gardeners' Union. It was a founding affiliate of the General German Trade Union Confederation in 1919, but remained small, with only 10,518 members in 1928. Despite this, such prominent figures as Otto Albrecht, Wilhelm Jannson, and Georg Schmidt, all entered trade unionism through the association.

The union established a library of 2,660 books relating to gardening, and published the journal, Gärtnereifachblatt. At the start of 1930, it merged with the German Transport Workers' Union, the Union of Municipal and State Workers, and the Union of German Professional Firefighters, to form the General Union of Public Sector and Transport Workers. The Union of Municipal and State Workers had represented most public sector garden workers, and both they and the former Gardeners' Union members were placed in a Gardens, Parks, and Cemeteries section, which by the end of the year had 24,048 members.

== Presidents ==
1906: Jakobloch
1907: Georg Schmidt
1909: Josef Busch
