= Chris Postiglione Triangle =

Green space in Queens, New York

Coordinates: 40°44′17″N 73°47′43″W

Chris Postiglione Triangle is a green space in the Fresh Meadows neighborhood of Queens, New York City, formed by the separation of the eastbound Horace Harding Expressway, 64th Avenue, and 174th Street. Its namesake, Christopher S. Postiglione (1968–1999), a construction worker at the New York City Department of Environmental Protection, who grew up in Queens.

On January 11, 1999, Postiglione was struck in a hit-and-run by a passing motorist as he was exiting his truck to repair a catch basin at this location. He died of his injuries 11 days later. His murderer had never been identified. On October 20, 2000, Mayor Rudy Giuliani signed legislation renaming the traffic triangle at the site of the hit after Postiglione.

The acute end of the triangle contains a small monument for Postiglione donated by his labor union, DC 37 Local 376. Within the triangle is a single tree, surrounded by shrubs. On the Horace Harding side of the park is a bus stop on the eastbound Q17 and Q88 routes.
