= Jaap Blom =

Dutch politician and trade unionist

Jakob Blom
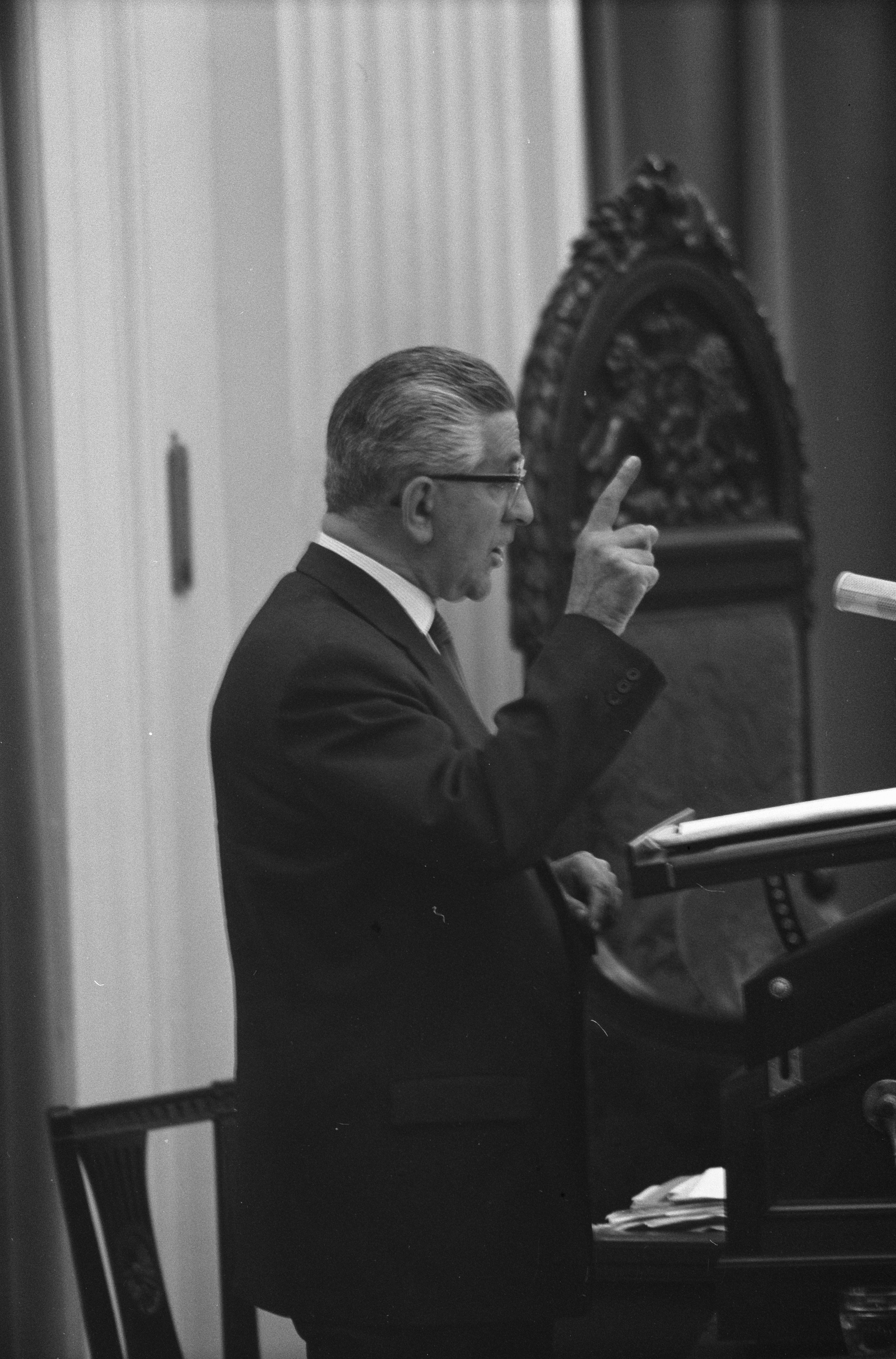
- Blom in 1961

Member of the House of Representatives
- In office 1952–1966

President of the General Union of Civil Servants
- In office 1949–1958

General Secretary of the International Federation of Unions of Employees in Public and Civil Services
- In office 1954–1956

Personal details
- Born: 23 September 1898 Oud-Beijerland, Netherlands
- Died: 26 May 1966 (aged 67)
- Party: Labour Party
- Occupation: Politician, trade unionist

Jakob Blom (23 September 1898 – 26 May 1966) was a Dutch politician and trade unionist.

Born in Oud-Beijerland, after World War II, Blom became prominent in the General Union of Civil Servants (ABVA), winning election as its president in 1949. He also joined the Labour Party (PvDA), and in 1952 was elected to the House of Representatives. In 1954, he also became general secretary of the International Federation of Unions of Employees in Public and Civil Services, serving for two years.

Blom left his trade union posts in 1958, to focus on his political career. From 1963, he was chair of the Defense Commission, and he also devoted time to promoting compensation for civil servants. He died in 1966, while still in office.

Trade union offices
Preceded by Nico Vijlbrief	President of the General Union of Civil Servants; 1949–1958	Succeeded by Arie van Rossen
Preceded by Maarten Bolle	General Secretary of the International Federation of Unions of Employees in Public and Civil Services; 1956–1958	Succeeded by Paul Tofahrn
