= Nelson "Jack" Edwards =

Nelson "Jack" Edwards (1917–1974) was Vice President of the UAW (United Auto Workers), and a founder of CBTU, the Coalition of Black Trade Unionists.

Nelson Edwards was born in 1917 on a farm in Lowndes County, Alabama. In 1937 he moved to Detroit and worked at the Chrysler plant, where he became active in the local union. Inspired by his brother John, Edwards began his union career during the union growth of the 1930s. He was elected UAW Union steward to represent workers in Chrysler's Foundry plant. He was laid off from Chrysler in 1941, and later obtained a job at the Ford Lincoln Plant on Detroit’s west side. Immediately, Edwards became active in his new union, Local 900, at that time freely-recognized by the Ford Motor Company. He served on the local’s education, citizenship, and by-laws committee and in 1944 was chosen to be chairman of that committee. Jack was involved in the civic and political life of Detroit, the State of Michigan, as well as the Nation for many years where he made substantial contributions.

In 1947 Edwards became an International Representative assigned to Region 1A Detroit’s Westside. His first major assignment was as an organizer in the UAW's drive to win Caterpillar workers (Peoria, IL.) into UAW, and away from the Farm Equipment Workers. Following that successful campaign to swell UAW ranks with agricultural implement workers, Edwards returned to his region and became a servicing representative. He helped handle plant problems in Ford Lincoln, Helsey-Hayes and several malleable iron plants. He completed 14 years as an International Representative. A dedicated union activist, Edwards rose through the union ranks, starting as a line steward to become the first black man elected to the UAW’s Executive Board, May 1962. A year later, in May 1963, he was asked by UAW President Walter P. Reuther to go to Birmingham, Alabama to assist African Americans in their struggle for equality. He was re-elected to that executive board position three times and in 1970 was elected union Vice President. He held this post for 15 years, when delegates appointed him to the UAW's International Executive Board. An ardent and persistent fighter in the struggle for civil rights, he was one of the founders of the Trade Union Leadership Council (TULC) in 1957 and now TULC_MDLCA; one of the founders of the Negro labor Council (NALC) in 1959, headed by Philip Randolph; and one of the founders of the Coalition of Black Trade Unionist (CBTU) in September 1972. As Vice President of the UAW, he headed the following Departments and Councils: Alcoa, Allen Industries; Bendix; Borg-Warner; Budd; Die Cast; Doehler-Jarvis; Donaldson; Drop Forge and Heat Treat; Eaton; Electric Storage Battery; Ex-Cell-O; Federal Mogul; Foundry; FMC-Food Machinery; Heating-Air Conditioning-Radiation and Refrigeration; Hoover; Houdaille; Independents-Parts and Suppliers; Indian Head; Kelsey-Hayes; Koehring; McQuay-Norris; Midland-Ross; Modine; Motor Wheel; Purolator; Standard Products; Sundstrand Council; and Teledyne. He was also Co-Director of the Manpower Training and Development Department and Chairman of UAW's Southeastern Michigan Community Action Program Council (SEMCAP). Jack was a member of many organizations including: NAACP (life member), Detroit Labor Action Council, New Detroit, Inc., Metropolitan Fund, Inc. United Foundation, COBTUU, Citizens Crusade Against Poverty, American Civil Liberties, Union Wayne County Stadium Authority, etc. Nelson Jack Edwards and the UAW Foundry Conferences were synonymous since its founding in the City of Milwaukee, Wisconsin in the year of 1948.

It was under the affirmative leadership of Nelson Jack Edwards that the Foundry Conference which gave birth to new concepts with the collective bargaining programs, personal paid time off, the special Foundry pension program of 25 and out, on-the-job medical examinations for family and forge workers at no cost to the worker, and the federal law of pension reinsurances of private pension programs all on the initiative of Nelson Jack Edwards and his pursuit for its enactment by Congress.

Edwards once said, "The Foundry Conference has been a pacesetter on many occasions. By its efforts on the collective bargaining front and in the legislative field, it has won many gains for foundry workers that have, in many cases, been extended to other workers in the Union," With great and warm feelings for his fellow man, he would plead. "Within this Great Society of ours rests an abundance and liberty for all. It demands an end to poverty and racial injustice—a place where every child can find knowledge to enrich his mind and to enlarge his talents...It is a place where man is more concerned with the quality of his goals than the quantity of his goods. But most of all the Great Society is not a safe harbor, a resting place, a final objective, a finished product—it is a challenge constantly renewed, beckoning us towards destiny where the meaning of lives matches the marvelous product of our labor."

Nelson Jack Edwards, 57, the first black man to become a vice-president of the UAW and long-time civil rights champion, was killed by a gunman, November 2, 1974. In the month of March 1975, a special memorial was held in honor of the late UAW Vice President and Foundry Department Director. As a tribute to the lasting memory of Nelson Jack Edwards, the International Union dedicated to him one of the buildings at the Walter and May Reuther UAW Family Education Center at Black Lake.
