= Klaus Zumwinkel =

German businessman

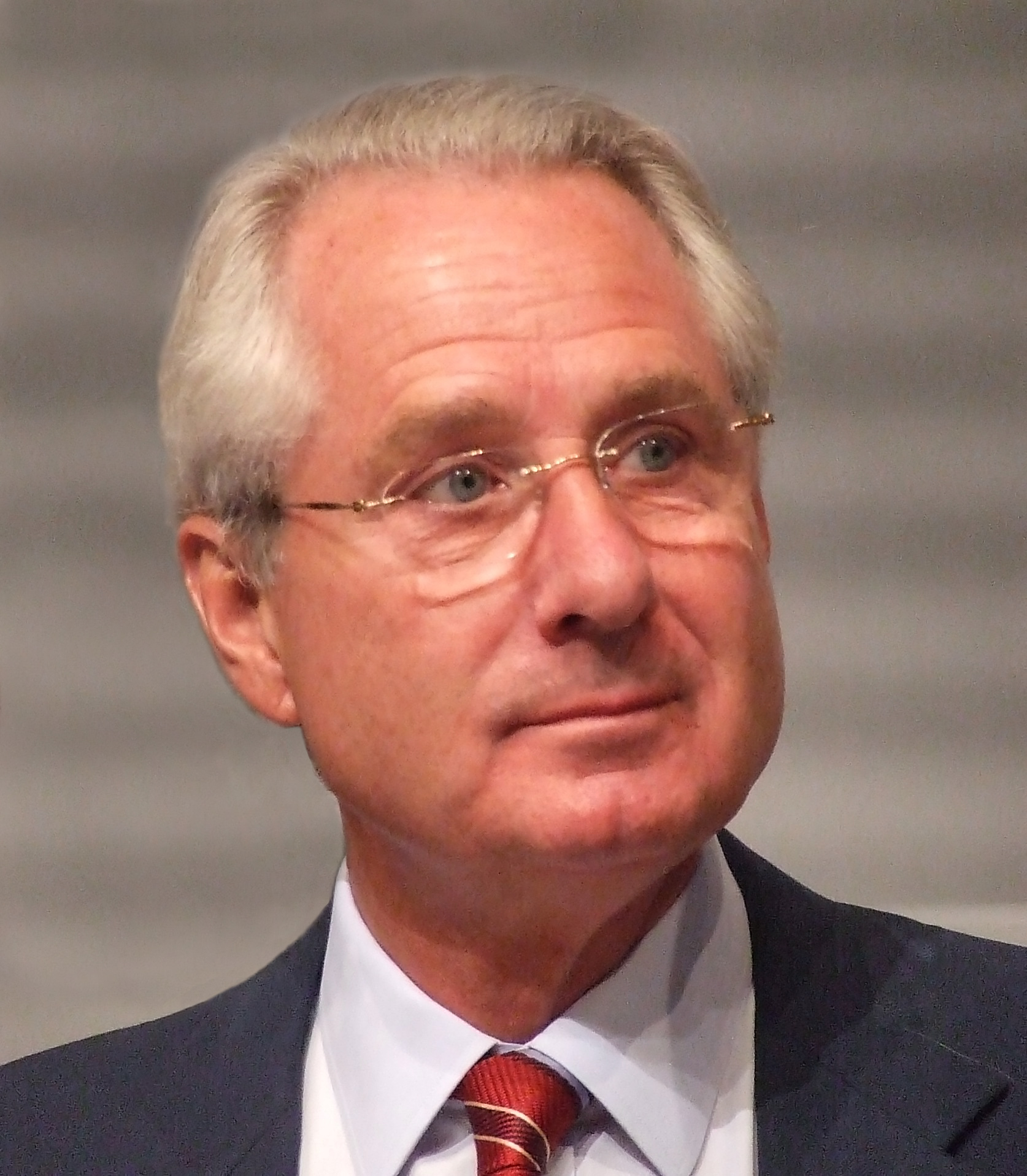
- Klaus Zumwinkel in 2007
- Born: December 15, 1943 (age 82); Rheinberg, Northrhine-Westphalia, Germany
- Education: University of Münster; Wharton Business School
- Occupation: Retired
- Title: Former Deutsche Post CEO
- Successor: Frank Appel

Klaus-Gerhard Maximilian Zumwinkel (German pronunciation: [ˈtsʊmvɪŋkəl], born December 15, 1943) was Chief Executive Officer (CEO) and Chairman of Deutsche Post between 1990 and 2008. Being under suspicion of tax fraud, he resigned from office on February 15, 2008. He was convicted in January 2009, and given a suspended sentence of two years imprisonment and fined one million euros.

== Early life ==
Zumwinkel was born in Rheinberg, Kreis Moers, Rheinprovinz, which is now in Kreis Wesel, Nordrhein-Westfalen. He attended Gymnasium Adolfinum in Moers and studied business at the University of Münster. Following graduation in 1969, he attended Wharton Business School of the University of Pennsylvania from 1970. He gained his M.Sc. in 1971, and returned to the University of Münster, where he qualified as Dr. rer. pol. in 1973.

== Career ==
Zumwinkel began his career as a consultant with McKinsey in 1974, leaving to become CEO of Quelle in 1984 before subsequently joining the management board of Deutsche Post in 1990.

From 2001 to 2004, Zumwinkel has been a member of the Board of Trustees of the Bertelsmann Stiftung.

== See also ==
- 2008 German tax affair
