= Frank Appel =

CEO of Deutsche Post

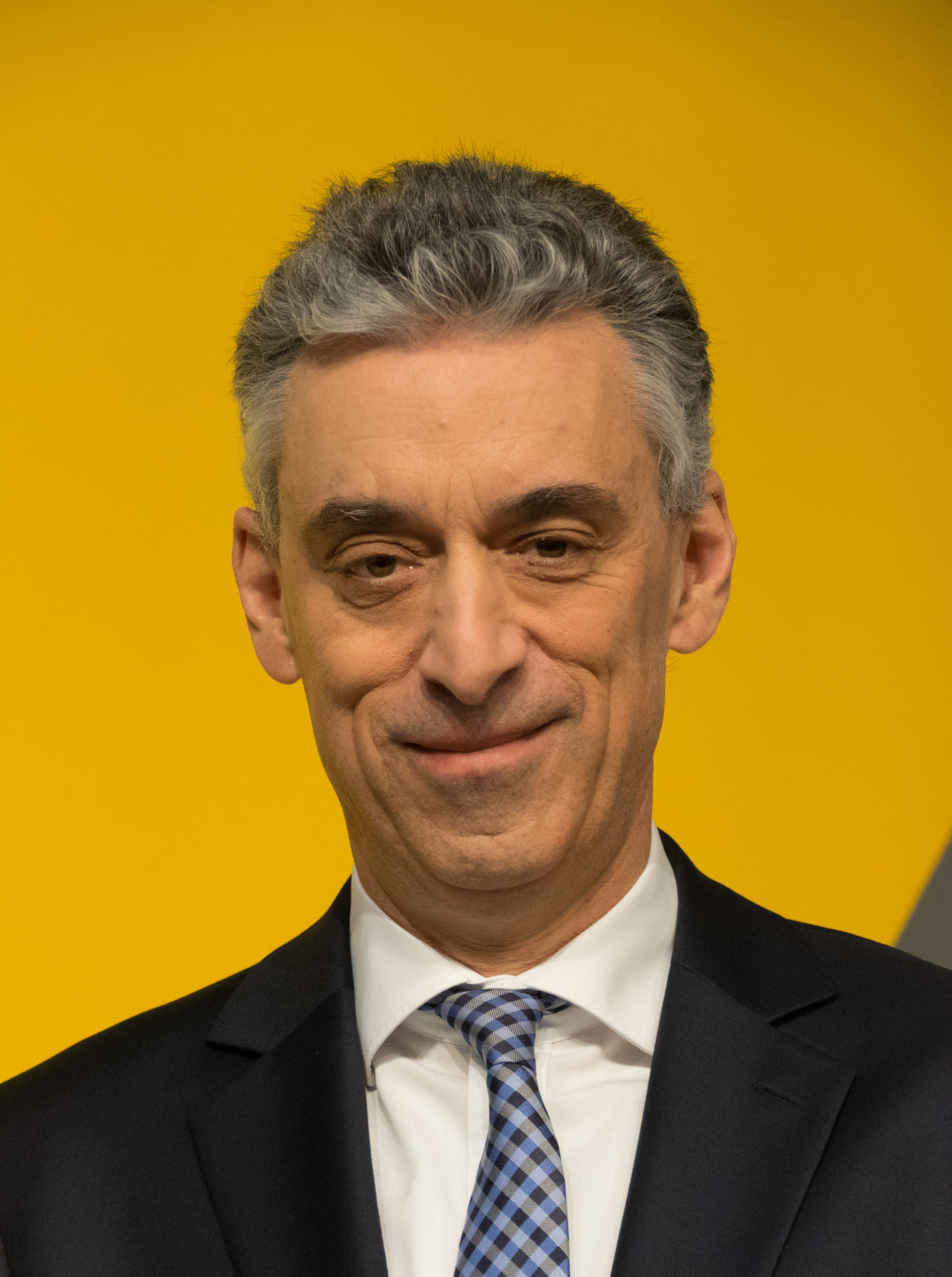
- Occupation: Generaldirektor of Deutsche Post
- Predecessor: Klaus Zumwinkel
- Successor: Tobias Meyer

Frank Appel is a German manager who was CEO of Deutsche Post from 2008 to 2023.

== Career ==
A former McKinsey consultant, Appel first joined Deutsche Post in 2000. From November 2002, he was a member of the Board of Management of Deutsche Post AG.

Appel was chairman of the supervisory board of Deutsche Postbank AG, but effective 31 December 2010, resigned his position on the supervisory board.

In his capacity as CEO, Appel accompanied Chancellor Angela Merkel on various state visits abroad, including to China in 2012 and in 2014.

At the shareholders' meeting on April 7, 2022, Appel was elected to the supervisory board of Deutsche Telekom AG until 2026. On the same day, he was elected by the supervisory board to succeed Ulrich Lehner as its chairman.

== Other activities ==
=== Government agencies ===
- Economic Development Board (EDB), Member of the International Advisory Council

=== Corporate boards ===
- RWE, Chair of the Supervisory Board (since 2025)
- Deutsche Telekom AG, Member and Chair of the Supervisory Board (since 2022)
- Fresenius, Member of the Supervisory Board (since 2021)
- DHL Global Forwarding, Chair of the Supervisory Board
- Adidas, Member of the supervisory board (2018–2019)
- Deutsche Postbank, Chair of the Supervisory Board (2008–2011)

=== Non-profit organizations ===
- Baden-Badener Unternehmer-Gespräche (BBUG), Member of the Board of Trustees
- econsense, Member of the Board of Trustees
- Federation of German Industries (BDI), Member of the Presidium
- Max Planck Society, Member of the Senate
- Working Group of Protestant Businesses (AEU), Member of the Board of Trustees

== Personal life ==
Appel was born in 1961, is married and is the father of two children. He spent his childhood growing up in Hamburg.

== Education ==
- 1989 - M.Sc. in chemistry at LMU Munich, Munich, Germany.
- 1993 - PhD in neurobiology at ETH Zurich, Zurich, Switzerland.
