= Cleveland Robinson =

American labor leader (1914–1995)

Cleve Robinson
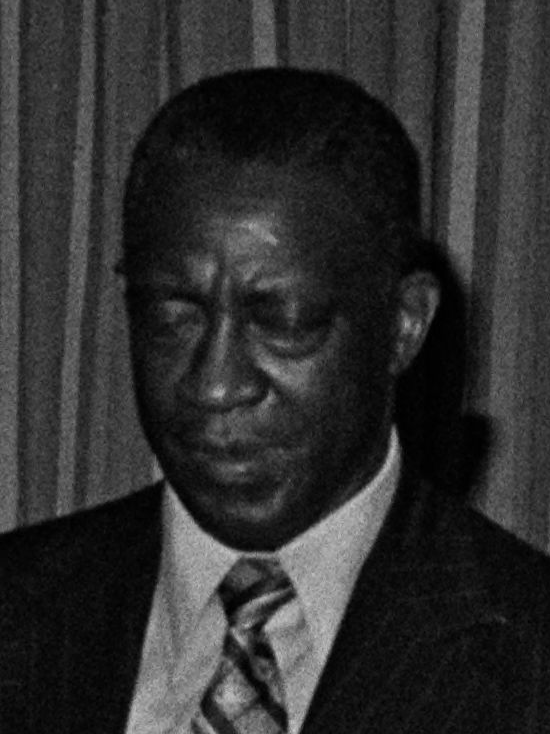
- Robinson in 1972
- Born: December 12, 1914; Swabys Hope, Jamaica
- Died: August 23, 1995 (aged 80); New York City, U.S.
- Occupation: Labor organizer
- Known for: March on Washington for Jobs and Freedom

Cleveland Lowellyn "Cleve" Robinson (December 12, 1914 – August 23, 1995) was a Jamaican-born American labor organizer and civil rights activist. He was a key figure in the 1963 March on Washington for Jobs and Freedom, for which he acted as the Chairman of the Administrative Committee.

== Life ==
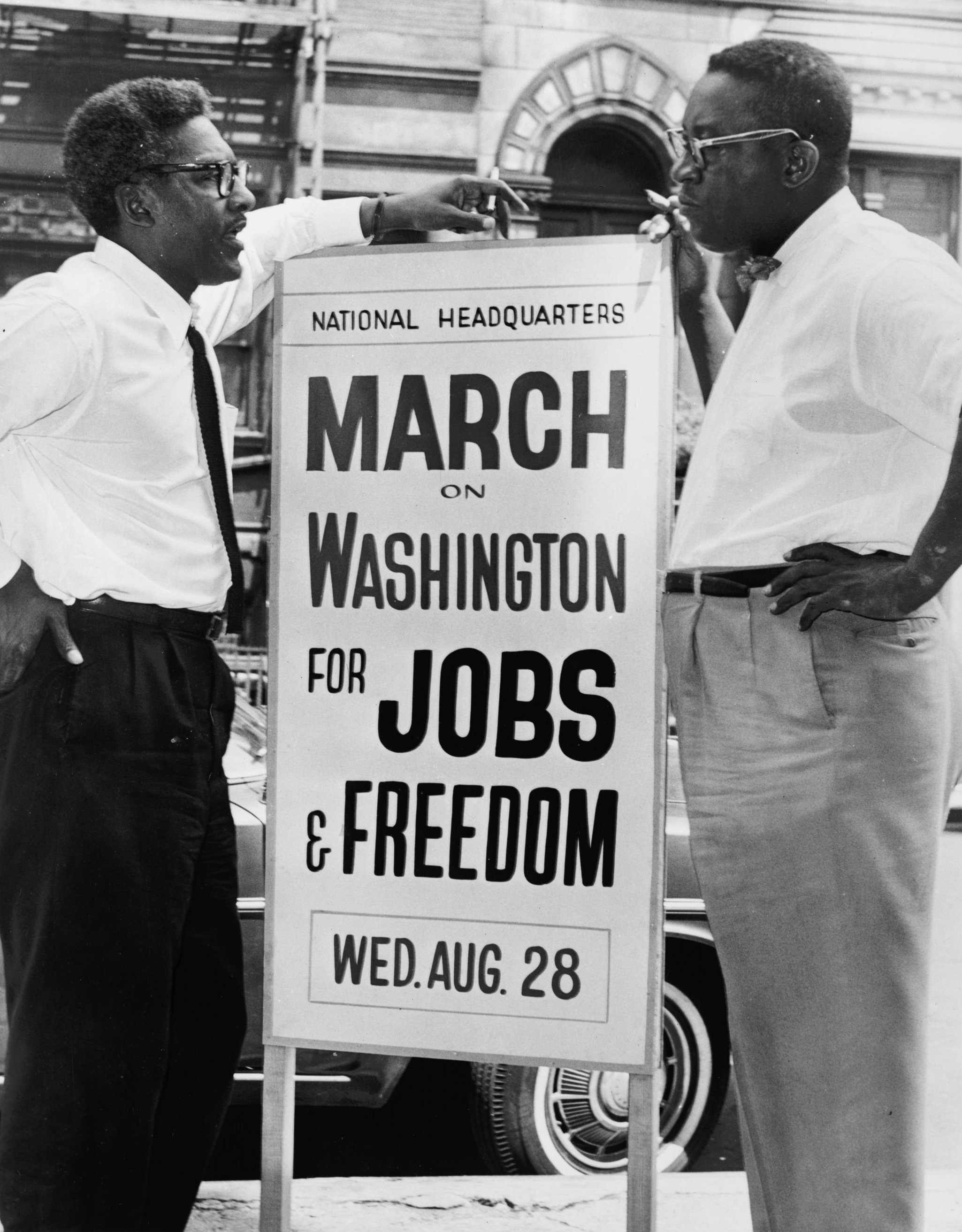
In front of 170 W 130 St., March on Washington, Bayard Rustin, Deputy Director, and Cleveland Robinson, Chairman of Administrative Committee (left to right). World Telegram & Sun photo by O. Fernandez. (Library of Congress's Prints and Photographs division)

Cleveland Robinson was born in Swabys Hope, in Manchester Parish, Jamaica. After serving as a local constable and an elementary school teacher, he emigrated to the U.S. in 1944. When he arrived, he took a job in a Manhattan dry goods store and very soon became active in District 65. In 1947 he owned his own shop; he went on to become a steward, and then a full-time organizer for the union. He was elected vice-president in 1950 and later in 1952 became secretary-treasurer. He held that position until he retired in 1992. When District 65 was affiliated with the Retail, Wholesale and Department Store Workers Union, Robinson held the positions of international vice-president and executive board member of that union. After disagreements with the retail, wholesale and department store workers union District 65 pulled out and organized the National Council of Distributive Workers of America and Robinson was elected president of the new body. In 1981, District 65 was affiliated with the United Auto Workers. At that time the union had 33,000 members in 37 states, Canada and Puerto Rico.

Robinson was a stalwart of the civil rights movement. In 1957, he participated in the Prayer Pilgrimage for Freedom. He was the chairman and one of the key organizers of the August 1963 March on Washington for Jobs and Freedom. In September 1972, he helped to found the Coalition of Black Trade Unionists (CBTU), successor organization to the Negro American Labor Council (NALC), and served as its first vice-president.

Robinson suffered from glaucoma for many years, and was legally blind by 1970. His level of commitment and activity was in no way impaired by this disability. He never lost touch with his Jamaican origins and traveled to the island often, keeping up a keen interest in a number of Jamaican-American political, cultural and fraternal organizations.

Robinson died of kidney failure in New York City in August 1995. His papers are held by the Tamiment Library & Robert F. Wagner Labor Archives, New York University.

== Family ==
His first wife was Sue Eliza Robinson; they had two sons and a daughter. When she died in 1976, he married Doreen McPherson Robinson.
