= Union of Dockers of Germany =

The Union of Dockers of Germany (German: Verband der Hafenarbeiter Deutschlands) was a trade union representing dock workers in Germany.

The union was founded on 1 January 1891, in the aftermath of a major strike in Hamburg. It brought together various local unions, and by May, when it held its first conference, it had 4,957 members. The conference elected Johann Schwarz, former leader of the Hamburg dockers, as its first president, but he was dismissed before the end of the year, having stolen money from the union. It published the newspaper Hafenarbeiters, and affiliated to the General Commission of German Trade Unions.

In 1892, the union merged with the shipbuilders' union, to form the Union of German People involved in Shipbuilding and Shipping. This did not prove a success, and in 1894, the two unions split again. The union was a founding constituent of what became the International Transport Workers' Federation.

In 1896, dockers in Hamburg held a major strike, in which Johann Döring emerged as the leading figure. Although the strike was defeated, the orderly way he ran the strike, and the clear demands he raised, led him to win election as president of the union in 1899. From 1900, the union admitted workers in related trades, such as inland waterway workers. Membership increased, and by 1904, had reached 14,054.

From the mid-1900s, the union started working closely with other unions representing transport workers in Germany, and at the start of 1910, it merged into the German Transport Workers' Union.

== Presidents ==
1891: Johann Schwarz
1891: Georg Kellermann
1899: Johann Döring
