= Dutch Union of Personnel in Government Service =

Former Dutch public trade union

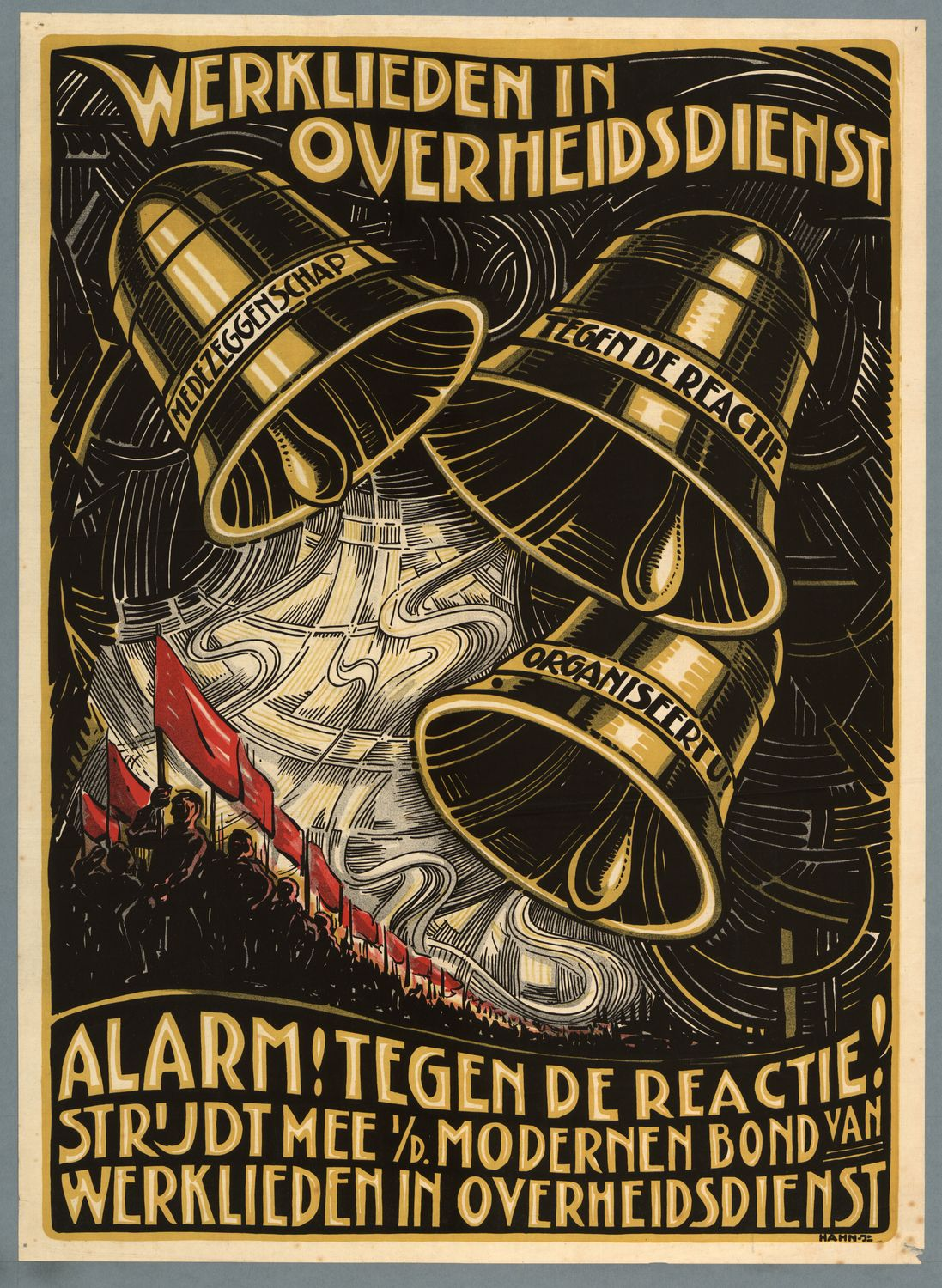
Poster calling on public sector laborers to unionize, designed by Albert Hahn jr., 1926

The Dutch Union of Personnel in Government Service (Dutch: Nederlandsche Bond van Personeel in Overheidsdienst, NBPO) was a trade union representing blue collar government workers in the Netherlands.

The union was founded in 1920, when the Dutch Association of Workers in Public Services and Companies merged with the State Workers' Union, to form the Dutch Union of Workers in Government Service. Like both its predecessors, it affiliated to the Dutch Confederation of Trade Unions (NVV). By 1921, it had 15,233 members. In 1924, it adopted its final name.

The union was banned under the Nazi occupation during World War II and re-established after the war; by the end of 1945, it had 12,858 members. At the end of the following year, it merged with the Central Dutch Union of Civil Servants, to form the General Union of Civil Servants.

== Presidents ==
1920: Nico van Hinte
1929: Frans van Meurs
1935: Maarten Bolle?
