= Public Services International =

Global union federation

- Abbreviation: PSI
- Formation: 1907
- Type: Global union federation
- Headquarters: Ferney-Voltaire, France
- Members: 30 million in 154 countries
- President: Britta Lejon
- General secretary: Daniel Bertossa
- Website: publicservices.international
- Formerly called: International Secretariat of the Workers in Public Services (1907–1925); International Federation of Employees in Public Services (1925–1935); International Federation of Employees in Public and Civil Services (1935–1946); International Federation of Unions of Employees in Public and Civil Services (1946–1958)

Public Services International (PSI) is the global union federation for workers in public services, including those who work in social services, health care, municipal services, central government and public utilities. As of November 2019, PSI has 700 affiliated trade unions from 154 countries representing over 30 million workers.

== History ==
In March 1907, the executive of the German Union of Municipal and State Workers, based in Berlin, issued a call to "workers employed in municipal and state undertakings, in power stations, in gas and waterworks, in all countries" to attend an international conference in August 1907, in Stuttgart. Four Danes, two Dutchmen, eight Germans, a Hungarian, a Swede, and a Swiss met in the Stuttgart trade union building for the First Congress of Public Services International, representing 44,479 workers, and they founded the International Secretariat of the Workers in Public Services. This grew rapidly, and by 1913 represented more than 100,000 workers, enabling a part-time salary to be paid to the secretary, based in Berlin.

The federation ceased to operate during the First World War, but was reactivated in 1919, now based in Amsterdam. In 1925, it renamed itself as the International Federation of Employees in Public Services, while in 1935 it absorbed the International Federation of Civil Servants, becoming the International Federation of Employees in Public and Civil Services. The headquarters moved back to Berlin in 1929, then to Amsterdam in 1933, and on to Paris. This closed in 1940, and the occupying Nazi forces destroyed the federation's property, but in 1945 the federation was relaunched at a meeting of the executive committee, held in London. The following year, it became known as the International Federation of Unions of Employees in Public and Civil Services, then in 1958 it shortened its name to become the "Public Services International".

== Policies ==
PSI is involved in the movement against privatization of public services by corporations across the world. PSI also works against tax evasion by multinational corporations and is a founding member of the International Commission for the Reform of International Corporate Taxation. PSI's pro-worker stance has put it at odds with the WTO, World Bank, and IMF who predominantly promote market solutions.

PSI works in partnership with affiliate trade unions, other global union federations and NGOs such as the Our World Is Not For Sale Network.

== Public Services International Research Unit ==
Financed by PSI, Public Services International Research Unit (PSIRU) researches the privatization and restructuring of public services around the world, with special focus on water, energy, waste management, and healthcare. Established in 2000, it is part of the Business School of the University of Greenwich, UK.

== Leadership ==
=== General Secretaries ===
1907: Albin Mohs
1919: Nico van Hinte
1929: Fritz Müntner
1933: Ludwig Maier (acting)
1933: Ernest Michaud
1935: Charles Laurent and Ernest Michaud
1937: Charles Laurent
1945: Maarten Bolle
1954: Jaap Blom
1956: Paul Tofahrn
1967: Werner Barazetti
1970: Carl Franken
1981: Hans Engelberts
2007: Peter Waldorff
2012: Rosa Pavanelli
2023: Daniel Bertossa

=== Presidents ===
1920: Peter Tevenan
1932: Charles Dukes
1937: Mark Hewitson
1939: Tom Williamson
1956: Adolph Kummernuss
1964: Gunnar Hallström
1973: Heinz Kluncker
1985: Victor Gotbaum
1989: Monika Wulf-Mathies
1994: William Lucy
2002: Ylva Thörn
2010: Dave Prentis
2023: Britta Lejon
