= International Federation of Civil Servants =

The International Federation of Civil Servants was a global union federation bringing together trade unions representing civil servants.

== History ==
Two international conferences of unions of civil servants were organised by the Austrian Association of Public Employees, and held in Vienna in 1923 and 1924. These led to the establishment of the International Federation of Civil Servants and Teachers in 1925, with headquarters in Paris.

In 1927, the International Federation of Trade Unions sponsored the creation of a new Teachers' International Trade Secretariat, and the unions of teachers decided to leave the International Federation of Civil Servants and Teachers, to join the new organisation. As a result, the federation shortened its name to the "International Federation of Civil Servants".

In 1935, the federation merged into the International Federation of Employees in Public Services, which renamed itself as the "International Federation of Employees in Public and Civil Services".

== General Secretaries ==
1925: F. S. Noordhoff
1931: Charles Laurent
