= Victor Gotbaum =

American labor activist

Victor H. Gotbaum (September 5, 1921 – April 5, 2015) was an American labor leader. From 1965 to 1987, he was president of AFSCME District Council 37 (DC37), the largest municipal union in New York City.

== Biography ==
Gotbaum was born in Brooklyn, New York. He married his first wife, Sarah, in August 1943. He fought in World War II, attended Brooklyn College and the School of International and Public Affairs at Columbia University, and took his first union job as assistant director of the Amalgamated Meat Cutters in Chicago, in 1955.

Under Gotbaum's leadership, DC37 successfully organized thousands of municipal hospital workers in the 1960s and helped create New York City's Office of Collective Bargaining. During the New York City bankruptcy crisis in the mid-1970s, Gotbaum and DC37 agreed to major collective bargaining concessions, which set a pattern that forced other municipal unions to do the same. The action helped the city avoid default on its bonds.

Gotbaum was succeeded by Stanley Hill, who was removed in 1998 in the midst of a major scandal, some of which may have had its roots under Gotbaum. After a trusteeship by AFSCME, Hill was ultimately succeeded in 2002 by Lillian Roberts, who first started working with Gotbaum in 1959.

Gotbaum divorced his first wife Dr. Sarah C. Gotbaum in the early 1970s and married Betsy Gotbaum in 1977. From 2002 to 2009, Betsy Gotbaum was the New York City Public Advocate.

Gotbaum's daughter-in-law Carol Anne Gotbaum was found dead on September 28, 2007 at the Phoenix Sky Harbor Airport. She was arrested for disorderly conduct, and initial reports indicate that Gotbaum may have accidentally strangled herself while trying to get out of her handcuffs. Carol Gotbaum was married to Noah Gotbaum, one son of Sarah and Victor Gotbaum.

Joshua Gotbaum, another son of Sarah and Victor, worked in the Carter, Clinton and Obama administrations and was a recess appointment as director of Pension Benefit Guaranty Corporation in 2010.

Victor Gotbaum died of a heart attack in Manhattan on April 5, 2015.

== In popular media ==
An interview with Gotbaum appeared in British filmmaker Adam Curtis's 2016 documentary HyperNormalisation. Gotbaum is seen criticizing the way bankers caused the New York City financial crisis of the 1970s.

Trade union offices
Preceded by Heinz Kluncker	President of the Public Services International; 1985–1989	Succeeded by Monika Wulf-Mathies
