= Union of Municipal and State Workers =

- Verband der Gemeinde- und Staatsarbeiter
- Merged: General Union of Public Sector and Transport Workers
- Founded: 4 October 1896
- Dissolved: December 31, 1929
- Headquarters: 42 Schlesische Straße, Berlin
- Location: Germany
- Members: 300,000 (1922)
- Publication: Gewerkschaft
- Affiliations: ADGB, ADB, PSI

The Union of Municipal and State Workers (German: Verband der Gemeinde- und Staatsarbeiter, VGS) was a trade union representing public sector workers in Germany.

== History ==
In September 1896, gas workers in Berlin went on strike in opposition to having to work for 18 hours on Sundays. Bruno Poersch, leader of the local union of saddlers, supported the strike, and helped found a union to represent them. This was officially established on 4 October, under the name the Union of Gas, Wood, Coal, and Other Workers, and by the end of the year, it had launched a journal. Poersch aimed to develop the union into one representing municipal workers, and so in 1897, the coal and wood workers were transferred to the German Transport Workers' Union, and the union became the Association of Gas and Other Municipal Workers, recruiting water, sewage, lighting, market and slaughterhouse workers, as well as inspectors of gas works. Section were established for each industry, and in 1899, the union was accepted into the social democratic trade union movement.

Under Poersch, the union took inspiration from the British trade union movement and notably argued that workers could best protect their interests if they worked for a single employer, and that strikes should be avoided whenever possible. It also argued for wages linked to seniority and the number of children each employee had, and for the unions to be politically neutral. These positions were unpopular with the rest of the trade union movement, and led Poersch to resign in 1906. He was replaced by Albin Mohs, who proved more malleable, and accepted frequent demands for specialist public sector workers to be represented by industrial unions.

Under Mohs, the union renamed itself as the "Union of Municipal and State Workers". It grew, and by 1910 had 39,262, an estimated 26% of all workers in the sector. In 1909, the union's conference voted to replaced Mohs with Richard Heckmann, by 26 votes to 25, but in view of the closeness of the vote, Heckmann refused the position, and Mohs continued. He had been general secretary of the International Secretariat of the Workers in Public Services since 1907, and from 1914 was paid for the role, allowing Heckmann to replace him as leader of the German union.

Under Heckmann, the union focused on negotiating collective agreements. It persuaded several small, local unions to merge in, and it signed agreements with larger unions which had some public sector workers. It was a founding member of the General German Trade Union Confederation in 1919, by 1922 had about 300,000 members.

By the start of 1930, union membership had fallen slightly, to 266,000 members. At the start of 1930, it union merged with the German Transport Workers' Union, the Union of Gardeners and Nursery Workers, and the Union of German Professional Firefighters, to form the General Union of Public Sector and Transport Workers.

== Presidents ==
1896: Bruno Poersch
1906: Albin Mohs
1914: Richard Heckmann
1922: Fritz Müntner
