= Leopoldo Piccardi =

Italian politician (1889–1974)

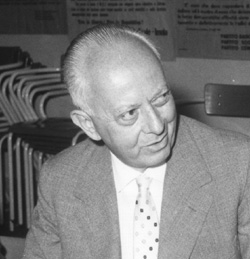

Minister of Industry and Commerce of the Kingdom of Italy
- In office 25 July 1943 – 16 November 1943
- Preceded by: Tullio Cianetti
- Succeeded by: Epicarmo Corbino

Personal details
- Born: 12 June 1889 Ventimiglia, Kingdom of Italy
- Died: 18 April 1974 (aged 84) Rome, Italy
- Party: National Fascist Party; Popular Unity; Radical Party

Military service
- Allegiance: Kingdom of Italy
- Branch/service: Royal Italian Army
- Rank: Captain
- Battles/wars: World War I; Battles of the Isonzo; World War II; Italian campaign

Leopoldo Piccardi (Ventimiglia, 12 June 1889 – Rome, 18 April 1974) was an Italian politician and civil servant, who served as Ministry of Industry and Commerce of the Badoglio I Cabinet, the first after the fall of the regime. After the war he became a founding member and secretary of the Radical Party until a scandal over his participation in anti-Semitic conferences during the Fascist period forced him to resign.

== Biography ==
During the First World War he was called up in 1917, fighting on the Karst Plateau and being later commissioned as a second lieutenant after attending an officer's course at the Military Academy of Turin; after the war he took part in Gabriele D'Annunzio's occupation of Fiume. In 1922 he entered the Judiciary of Italy and in 1930 the Council of State, of which he became a councilor in 1930. In 1932 he joined the National Fascist Party. After the fall of the Fascist regime, he was appointed Minister for Industry and Commerce in the Badoglio I Cabinet; in this role he proposed the appointment of Bruno Buozzi, Guido De Ruggiero, Giuseppe Di Vittorio, Achille Grandi, Oreste Lizzadri, Gioacchino Quarello, Giovanni Roveda and Ezio Vanoni as extraordinary commissioners of the trade union confederations. In November 1943 he resigned from his post as minister to enlist as an artillery captain in the Italian Co-belligerent Army until September 1944, when he was recalled and appointed extraordinary commissioner of the Istituto per la Ricostruzione Industriale. In 1946 he was retired by the State Council.

In 1953, Piccardi joined Popular Unity, a liberal socialist movement created to thwart the attempt made by the Christian Democrats, with the approval of the so-called "fraud law" (an electoral law that assigned 65% of parliament seats to the party that gained at least 50% of all valid votes), to "fraudulently" secure an absolute majority in the two branches of Parliament. Popular Unity ran in the political elections of 7 June 1953, obtaining a modest result and no seats, but sufficient to prevent the parties of the government coalition from reaching the quorum required for the majority prize. On 28 November 1954 Piccardi was elected to the executive committee of the movement, together with Tristano Codignola, Ferruccio Parri, Paolo Battino Vittorelli and Oliviero Zuccarini. However, in the Sicilian regional elections of 1955, "Unità Popolare" invited to vote the Italian Socialist Party; this caused a rift between Piccardi and his liberal democratic current and the rest of the party.

During a meeting of the Central Committee (Rome, 18 December 1955), Piccardi and his group explained the reasons why they would detach from the movement. During 1955 Piccardi had participated in some meetings organized by the "Friends Il Mondo", and formed an executive committee in charge of creating a new liberal democratic party, which was established on 5 February 1956 with the name of Radical Party. Parri and Arrigo Olivetti (a liberal among the founders of Il Mondo, brother-in-law of the better known Adriano Olivetti) later passed from Popular Unity to the Radical Party as well. On 28 February 1959 Piccardi was elected to the post of secretary of the Radical Party, together with Franco Libonati, Arrigo Olivetti and Eugenio Scalfari. On 6 November 1960 he was to the city council of Rome.

In 1961 historian Renzo De Felice, in a new book on the history of Italian Jews under Fascism, revealed that Piccardi, as a member of the Council of State, had participated in 1938 and 1939 in two Italian-German legal conferences on the theme "Race and law", which had contributed to the theoretical elaboration of the Italian racial laws. In December 1961 Mario Pannunzio and other members of the "Friends of Il Mondo" condemned Piccardi, asking for his resignation from the Radical Party, while Ernesto Rossi and Ferruccio Parri supported him. The party secretariat and leadership resigned; internal strife went on for a few months, and the Radical Party essentially disintegrated, with most of its member going over to the Italian Socialist Party. In October 1962 Piccardi, together with other radical exponents, asked for the dissolution of the party and its merger into the Italian Socialist Party, but internal conflicts pushed him to resign.
