= Giovanni Roveda =

Italian politician and mayor

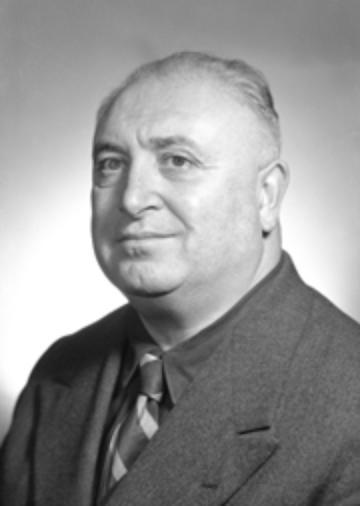
Roveda in 1948

Giovanni Roveda (4 June 1894 – 17 November 1962) was an Italian trade union leader, communist politician and anti-fascist activist.

Born in Mortara, Roveda moved to Turin when he was 13, to undertake an apprenticeship as a lithographer. In 1909, he joined the youth federation of the Italian Socialist Party, and demonstrated against the Italian-Turkish War, and then World War I. Although he was conscripted in 1915, because of his politics, he was not sent to the front.

After the war, Roveda became a full-time trade union organiser, and in 1919, he was elected as the national secretary of the Italian Federation of Wood Workers. The newspaper L'Ordine Nuovo was also founded in 1919, and Roveda was involved in an editorial capacity from the start.

In 1920, Roveda supported the factory occupations. He also became a founder member of the Italian Communist Party (PCI). In April, he became the secretary of the Turin Trades Council. From 1922, he served on the executive of the General Confederation of Labour. He argued against any attempt to work with the fascist government, but did not put forward any positive proposal. He became identified with the right wing of the PCI, and from 1924 served on the executive of the now illegal party.

Roveda was arrested in 1925, but was soon released, and attended a plenum of the Comintern in Moscow early in 1926. In November, he was arrested again, and sentenced to 20 years in prison. He was released in March 1937, but re-arrested in April for failing to repent his views, and was imprisoned for the next few years at Ventotene, where he met many new and old comrades from the PCI.

In 1943, Roveda received permission to visit his wife, who was ill. While on temporary release, he evaded police, and with the help of Umberto Massola escaped to Milan, where he was involved in organising strikes. When the regime fell, he was the first to address crowds in the city, and proposed a popular front to govern. He accepted a post of national deputy commissioner of industrial workers, on the advice of the PCI leadership, although many other PCI members criticised him for taking the role.

Roveda took part in the discussions which formed the Italian General Confederation of Labour, and he was appointed as joint deputy general secretary. However, before he could take up the post, the Nazis occupied Rome, and Roveda was again arrested. In June 1944, partisans attacked the prison where he was being held and freed him, but he was shot and seriously injured. He was taken to Milan, and by September had recovered sufficiently to be placed in charge of PCI activities in Northern Italy.

In November 1944, Roveda moved to Turin, to further his recuperation. In April 1945, he was elected as Mayor of Turin, organising reconstruction and the supply of food and water. He organised a Congress of Mayors of regional capital cities, to try to gain more autonomy and resources. In January 1946, he was elected to the central committee of the PCI. In June, he was elected to the National Constituent Assembly, and he subsequently served in the Italian Senate until 1958.

Roveda's term as Mayor of Turin ended in November 1946, and he returned to leading the Turin Trades Council. In December, he was elected as general secretary of the Italian Federation of Metalworkers (FIOM). In 1949, he became the founding president of the Trade Union International of Workers in the Metal Industry. In 1955, FIOM was heavily defeated in internal elections for representation at FIAT, and Roveda took the blame, standing down from the post. He instead became general secretary of the international, serving for a couple of years. He then returned to Turin, where he worked for the PCI. He died in 1962, from complications from the bullet he took in 1944.

Trade union offices
Preceded by Antonio Negro	General Secretary of the Italian Federation of Metalworkers; 1946–1956	Succeeded by Agostino Novella
Preceded by New position	President of the Trade Union International of Workers in the Metal Industry; 1949–1956	Succeeded by Livio Mascarello
Preceded by Marcel Bras	General Secretary of the Trade Union International of Workers in the Metal Industry; 1956–1958	Succeeded by Giacomo Adduci
Civic offices
Preceded by Michele Fassio	Mayor of Turin; 1945–1946	Succeeded by Celeste Negarville
