= Italian General Confederation of Labour =

Italian trade union

CGIL
- Italian General Confederation of Labour
- Confederazione Generale Italiana del Lavoro
- Predecessor: General Confederation of Labour
- Founded: 9 June 1944
- Headquarters: Corso d'Italia 25; 00198 Rome, Italy
- Location: Italy
- Members: 5,149,885 (2023)
- Key people: Maurizio Landini (General Secretary)
- Affiliations: ITUC, ETUC, TUAC
- Website: cgil.it

The Italian General Confederation of Labour (Italian: Confederazione Generale Italiana del Lavoro, pronounced [koɱfederatˈtsjoːne dʒeneˈraːle itaˈljaːna del laˈvoːro]; CGIL [ˌtʃiddʒiˈɛlle]) is a national trade union centre in Italy. It was formed by an agreement between socialists, communists, and Christian democrats in the "Pact of Rome" of June 1944. In 1950, socialists and Christian democrats split forming UIL and CISL, and since then the CGIL has been influenced by the Italian Communist Party (PCI) and until recent years by its political heirs: the Democratic Party of the Left (PDS), the Democrats of the Left (DS) and currently the Democratic Party (PD).

It has been the most important Italian trade union since its creation. It has a membership of over 5.5 million. The CGIL is currently the second-largest trade union in Europe, after the German DGB, which has over 6 million members. The CGIL is affiliated with the International Trade Union Confederation and the European Trade Union Confederation, and is a member of the Trade Union Advisory Committee to the OECD.

== History ==
=== Beginnings and opposition to Fascism ===
The roots of CGIL date back to early 1900s with the foundation of the General Confederation of Labour, an Italian labour union founded in 1906, under the initiative of socialist members. In 1926, during the fascist dictatorship of Benito Mussolini, CGdL's headquarter in Milan was attacked and completely destroyed by fascist blackshirts; after few months, the CGdL's central committee decided to dissolve the trade union and disbanded the entire organization. Their decision was opposed by communists and left socialists like Bruno Buozzi, who spent the next decades maintaining the old trade union clandestinely. The underground CGdL faced a perilous course, not only because of the fascist repression, but because of the dramatic changes in direction of the Communist International (IC). In 1929 Italian communist militants were ordered to enter fascist trade unions, only to be told in 1935, when the IC adopted the Popular Front strategy, to reconcile with the socialists and other anti-fascists in trade unions and faced the fascist regime.

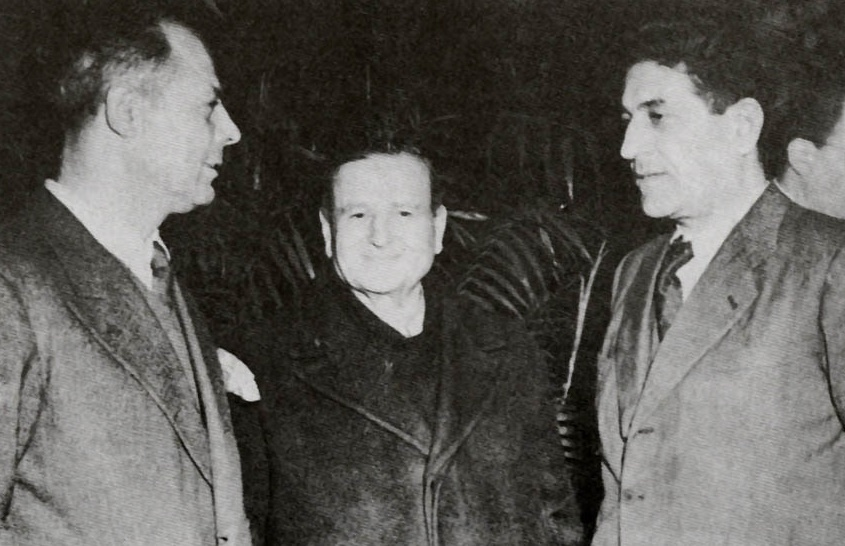
The three CGIL leaders, Lizzardi, Grandi and Di Vittorio, in 1945.

On 9 June 1944, the Pact of Rome was signed between representatives of the three main anti-fascist parties: the Christian Democracy (DC), the Italian Socialist Party (PSI) and the Italian Communist Party (PCI). However, a few days before, Bruno Buozzi, who had worked intensively on the Pact, was murdered by the Nazi troops. The pact established the foundation of a new CGdL, named Italian General Confederation of Labour (CGIL). The Pact was signed by Giuseppe Di Vittorio for the PCI, by Achille Grandi for the DC and by Emilio Canevari for the PSI. The latter will be later replaced as responsible for the socialist component of CGIL by Oreste Lizzadri.

Despite the unitary CGIL was strongly supported by communists and socialists, the Catholic Church did not oppose it. However, in 1945 it favoured the establishment of the Christian Associations of Italian Workers (ACLI). Until the end of the World War, the CGIL worked in the freed regions to spread the so-called "Labour Chambers" and stipulated wage agreements. With the general insurrection proclaimed by the Italian Resistance on 25 April 1945 and the definitive defeat of the Nazi-Fascist regime, the CGIL extended its influence throughout the country. The trade union contributed to the victory of the Republic in the 1946 institutional referendum, that ended the Savoy's monarchy.

=== First congress and split ===
On 1 February 1947, Salvatore Giuliano, a Sicilian bandit and separatist leader, killed 11 farmworkers and wounded other 27, during May Day celebrations in the municipality of Piana degli Albanesi. His aim had been to punish local leftists for the recent election results. In an open letter, he took sole responsibility for the murders and claimed that he had only wanted his men to fire above the heads of the crowd; the deaths had been a mistake. The massacre created a national scandal and the CGIL called a general strike in protest against the massacre. According to newspaper reports hints at the possibility of civil war were heard as communist leaders harangued meetings of 6,000,000 workers who struck throughout Italy in protest against the massacre.

After a few months, in the first national congress, which took place in Florence in June 1947, the CGIL registered 5,735,000 members and Giuseppe Di Vittorio, from the PCI, was elected General Secretary. Already during the congress, the signs of the divisions between the social-communist component and the Catholic were evident. Tensions increased with the beginning of the Cold War and the 1948 general election, which saw the DC facing the socialists and communists' Popular Democratic Front. The pretext that the Christian democratic faction was trying to create to split from the CGIL was provided by the general strike that the Confederation proclaimed following the attack to the communist leader, Palmiro Togliatti, which took place outside the Italian Parliament on 14 July 1948. The Catholic associations ACLI offered a structure on which built, after few days from the strike, the Christian democratic trade union, which was initially named "Free CGIL" and then, in 1950, Italian Confederation of Workers' Trade Unions (CISL). In the same year, the secular and social-democratic faction split from the CGIL too, founding the Italian Federation of Labor, which was quickly transformed into the Italian Labour Union (UIL). These are, even today, the three main Italian trade unions.

=== Di Vittorio Era ===
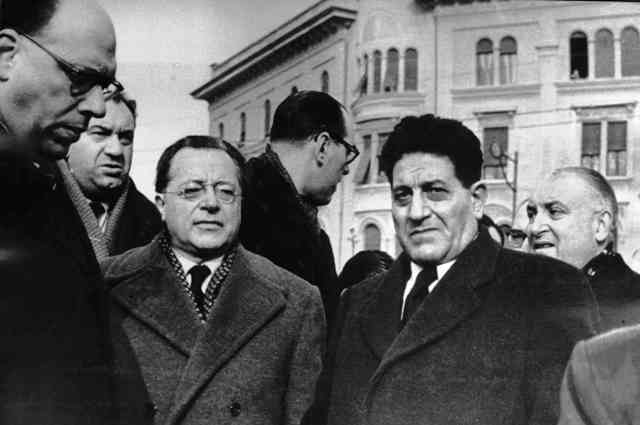
Di Vittorio with Communist leader, Palmiro Togliatti in Modena, 1950.

In January and March 1953, Di Vittorio proclaimed general strikes against the so-called "Scam Law", an electoral law proposed by the Christian Democratic government of Alcide De Gasperi, which introduced a majority bonus of two-thirds of seats in the Chamber of Deputies for the coalition which would obtain at-large the absolute majority of votes.

The anti-communist winds broke out in harsh repression against CGIL members in factories and in the countryside. Many activists were fired, while many others were forced into the so-called "confinement" departments, where communist members were humiliated. To increase the repression against communists, the American ambassadress in Italy, Clare Boothe Luce, declared that the companies where the CGIL trade unionists obtained more than 50% of the votes in the internal commission's election, could not have access to deals with the United States of America. Moreover, Pope Pius XII launched the excommunication to the communists and favoured the alliance between DC and neo-fascist Italian Social Movement (MSI), for the Municipality of Rome. Police repression was also very hard, due to the Christian democratic Minister of the Interior, Mario Scelba, who ordered the police to shoot the communist demonstrators, in order to prevent further strikes. On 9 January 1950, six workers were killed by police in Modena, while more than 200 had been wounded.

Giuseppe Di Vittorio, along with the socialist Fernando Santi, reacted to the Government and Confindustria, launching the "Work Plan", a major political initiative with an alternative idea of economic and social development. The Work Plan supported the nationalization of electric companies, the creation of a vast program of public works and public housing and the establishment of a national body for land reclamation. The Plan of Work was not implemented by the Government but with it the CGIL managed to break the isolation, speaking to the whole country and keeping workers and unemployed workers together, from the industrialized North to the rural South. In the early 1950s, the contrast between CISL and UIL was at its peak; while the CGIL was fighting for great national issues, CISL, backed by the government, pursued its rooting in factories, signing numerous separate agreements.

The tragic facts of the 1956 Hungarian revolution, brutally repressed by the Soviet Union, reinforced the conflict between the three trade unions. For CGIL it was a very difficult moment: Di Vittorio, who, unlike the Communist Party, had immediately condemned the Soviet invasion, was forced by Togliatti to a humiliating retraction. Many officials resigned and the number of members dropped by 1 million from 1955 to 1958. Di Vittorio died on 3 November 1957 in Lecco, after a trade union assembly. He directed the CGIL during the post-war period, preserving its internal unity and creating the premises for the resumption of the unitary dialogue with CISL and UIL. On 3 December, Agostino Novella was elected new General Secretary.

=== Protests of 1968 and Hot Autumn ===
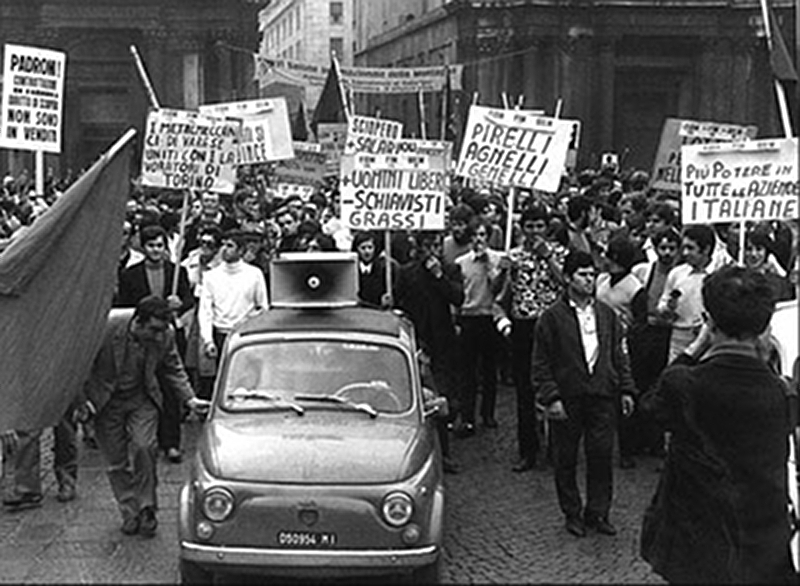
Metalworkers' protests in Turin during the Hot Autumn of 1969.

After years of approach between the three trade unions, in 1966, the Catholic association ACLI broke with the Christian Democracy, asking for a new season of cooperation with communists. 1968 opens with a historical success for the workers' movement: the pension reform, obtained after a strong protest in workplaces. The general strike proclaimed by the CGIL on 7 March was characterized by massive and unitary participation in all the country. The student revolt, launched by the Californian University of Berkeley against the Vietnam War, extended to France, Germany and Italy. In Italy, the student struggles were intertwined with the workers' struggles that, in hundreds of factories, invested work organization, contracts, timetables, and wage inequalities. On 1 May 1968, for the first time after the 1948 break, CGIL, CISL and UIL celebrated Labor Day together. Moreover, the 7th National Congress of CGIL in Livorno was attended for the first time by members from CISL and UIL.

On 21 August 1968, Novella's CGIL not only expressed its clear condemnation against the Soviet invasion of Czechoslovakia, but broke with the World Federation of Trade Unions, the international organization of Marxist-inspired unions. Meanwhile, in Italy, the struggles in the South exploded and the Government did not hesitate in repressing them with extreme hardness. On 2 December 1968, in Avola, near Siracusa, the police shot the workers who were demonstrating after the end of the negotiations for the renewal of employment contracts, killing two demonstrators. On 9 April 1969, near Battipaglia, Campania, the police shot workers who were demonstrating against the probable closure of the local tobacco factory, killing a 19-year-old worker and a young teacher. Workers' protest continued in the so-called Hot Autumn (Autunno Caldo), a term used for a series of large strikes in factories and industrial centres of Northern Italy, in which workers demanded better pay and better conditions. In 1969 and 1970 there were over 440 hours of strikes in the region. The decrease in the flow of labour migration from Southern Italy had resulted in nearly full employment levels in the northern part of the country.

=== Lama Era ===
On 24 March 1970, Luciano Lama succeeded Novella, becoming the third General Secretary of CGIL. Through all his secretariat, Lama pursued a unified policy between the three unions. In May 1970, on the wave of the great mass struggles and thanks to the socialist Minister of Labour, Giacomo Brodolini, the "Statute of Workers" was approved by the Parliament.

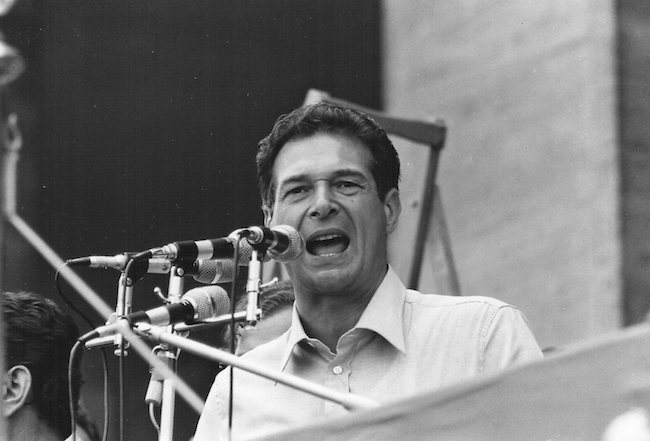
Secretary Luciano Lama addressing the crowd during a rally in the 1970s.

In October 1970 the general councils of the three confederations met together in Florence to examine the possibility of starting a unification process. In particular, the metalworkers' factions, FIOM, FIM and UILM, strongly supported the union, but the proposal faced strong opposition from UIL and large sectors of CISL. In July 1972, the three general councils, in a unified session, signed the "Federative Pact" in Rome, electing a joint committee of 90 members and a secretariat of 15 members. The CGIL–CISL–UIL Federation will guarantee the unitary management of the main trade union events for all the 1970s and will be dissolved only after the so-called "Valentine's Day decree" of Bettino Craxi's government in 1984.

The 1970s were also marked by great civil rights achievements. In 1970 the Law n. 898 on divorce was approved, while in 1971 the Parliament approved the Law n. 1204 for the protection of working mothers and the one on nursery schools. In 1975, Law n. 151 introduced equality between men and women inside families. Finally, in 1978 the Law n. 194 "Rules for the social protection of motherhood and voluntary interruption of pregnancy" was approved. However, in the second half of the decade, the unions' action began to weaken. Entrepreneurs used the economic crisis to overturn in their favour the balance of power, resulting from Hot Autumn. Intense restructuring processes were implemented almost everywhere, favoured by the introduction of new automation technologies. While, investments in new plants, based on robotics and information technology created unemployment.

During the decade, with the beginning of the so-called, "strategy of tension", the CGIL was the target of terrorist attack, perpetrated by neo-fascist groups. On 28 May 1974, a bomb exploded during a trade union rally in Piazza della Loggia, Brescia, killing eight people and wounding more than one hundred. The bomb was placed inside a rubbish bin at the east end of the square. It was the beginning of the Years of Lead, a period of social and political turmoil that lasted from the late 1960s until the early 1980s, marked by a wave of both left-wing and right-wing political terrorism, which culminated with the kidnapping and murder of Christian democratic leader, Aldo Moro, in 1978 and Bologna railway station massacre in 1980.

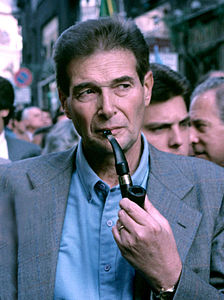
Lama during the 1980s.

In February 1978 three trade unions, on the initiative of Luciano Lama, ratified at the Palazzo dei Congressi in Rome, a document, known as the "EUR Turn", proposing a wage restraint in exchange for an economic policy that would support the development and defend employment. But in those years, CGIL and the unitary union were mostly committed to fighting the strategy of tension, defending democracy and democratic institutions from terrorist attacks. The total isolation of subversive groups from the working world would be the main basis of their defeat. In September 1980, Fiat declared that it would proceed with the dismissal of 14,000 workers and unilaterally put 23,000 workers into redundancy. Metalworkers blocked the Fiat factories for 35 days. Luciano Lama and Enrico Berlinguer, General Secretary of the Communist Party, strongly supported the workers' strikes. In October 1980, Fiat's employees and managers protested through the streets of Turin in an event remembered as the "March of Forty Thousand", to protest against the strikes and against the trade unions which organized it. It was a sound defeat for all Italian trade unions, but especially for the CGIL. The "Fiat case" marked forever trade unions' history in Italy, accelerating towards the dissolution of the unitary federation.

In June 1982, the three unions rejected, with a major demonstration in Rome in June 1982, the end of an agreement on the sliding wage scale, better known in Italy as "escalator" (scala mobile in Italian), a method which consisted in increasing the wages as the prices rise in order to maintain the purchasing power of the workers even if there is inflation. However, after few days CISL and UIL opened to the revision of the "escalator", while CGIL was strongly against it. On 14 February 1984, the government led by socialist Prime Minister, Bettino Craxi, unilaterally reduced the "escalator" with the famous "Valentine's Day decree". CISL and UIL expressed their positive view on the decree, while the CGIL announced strikes. The divisions between the trade unions caused the definitive breaking of the unitary federation. The CGIL launched a referendum on the "escalator", which was rejected by voters, marking a strong defeat for the trade union.

=== From the late 1980s to Tangentopoli ===
The defeat in the referendum on the escalator opened a difficult period for the CGIL, in a context marked by a drastic loss of representativeness of the three confederations and the birth of small autonomous trade unions. In 1986 Antonio Pizzinato, succeeded Lama, becoming the new General Secretary. However, difficulties within the CGIL were suddenly reflected in the following National Congress. Pizzinato, after only two years of the secretariat, resigned from his post in favour of Bruno Trentin, former General Secretary of FIOM during the Hot Autumn.

Meanwhile, in the Soviet Union, the new head of the Soviet Communist Party, Mikhail Gorbachev, started the Perestroika reform movement. Meanwhile, other socialist countries were also invested in renewal processes, inspired by Solidarność trade union movement in Poland. In 1989 the collapse of the Berlin Wall assumed the symbolic value of the defeat of socialism in the countries of the Soviet bloc.

In 1992 the Tangentopoli scandal broke out. It was a nationwide judicial investigation into political corruption in Italy, which led to the demise of the so-called "First Republic", resulting in the disappearance of many political parties. Christian Democracy, which dominated the entire political system for almost fifty years, was disbanded in January 1994, while the Socialist Party disappeared in November. The Communist Party had previously transformed into a democratic socialist party, the Democratic Party of the Left (PDS), led by Achille Occhetto, but it suffered a split from the left with the foundation of the Communist Refoundation Party (PRC), by Armando Cossutta. In this period, new populist movements, such as the Northern League (LN), grew up.

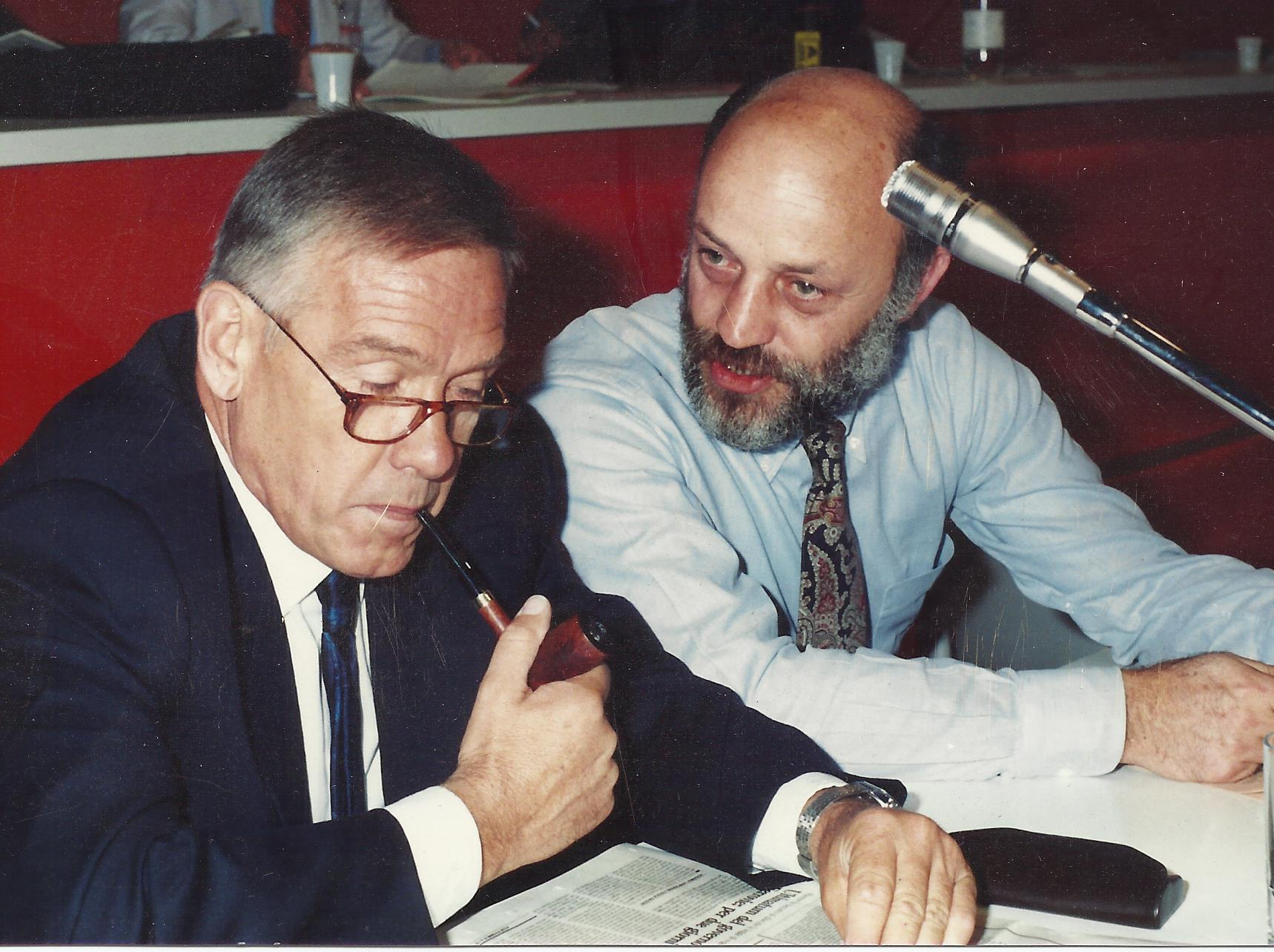
Bruno Trentin with Agelo Airoldi during a CGIL National Congress in the early 1990s.

In July 1992, the government of Giuliano Amato proposed the definitive overcome of the "escalator" and its replacement with a negotiated recovery. Bruno Trentin, to prevent a new dramatic rupture between the unions, signed the agreement and then resigned, being that signature contrary to the negotiating mandate of the governing bodies of CGIL. The next CGIL directorate rejected his resignation and decided to negotiate a new system of relations based on the income policy. A few days later, the financial crisis seems to plunge into bankruptcy. Amato's government decided a drastic devaluation of Italian lira, the consequent exit from the European Monetary System and an extraordinary financial bill of one hundred thousand billion. The measures implemented, such as the increase in the retirement age and the seniority of contributions, the blocking of retirement, the "minimum tax" on autonomous income, the balance sheet on companies, the withdrawal on bank accounts, the introduction of health tickets, the institution of house tax (ICI), caused a widespread of social protest which turned against the three trade unions too. However, in July 1993 CGIL, CISL and UIL signed a new wage agreement with the new Prime Minister, Carlo Azeglio Ciampi, and Confindustria.

On 29 June 1994, Sergio Cofferati became the new General Secretary of CGIL and quickly start facing the new Prime Minister, Silvio Berlusconi, a media magnate who founded the new conservative party, Forza Italia (FI), collecting the electoral heritage of the Christian Democrats in the 1994 election, in alliance with the Northern League and the heirs of the neo-fascist MSI, National Alliance (AN). The first act of the Berlusconi's government concerned the attempt to radically reduce the Italian social security system, breaking the "pact between generations" that supports it. The confederations react unanimously with extreme determination and on 12 November a demonstration took place in Rome with a million workers and pensioners. The great popular participation in protest put the centre-right coalition in crisis and, with the withdrawal of the League from the cabinet, the Berlusconi's government fell. The reform, launched in 1995 after an agreement with the social partners and the positive outcome from workers, innovated the social security system with a gradual transition to the contributory system and the beginning of supplementary pensions.

With the victory of Romano Prodi's centre-left coalition in 1996 general election, the dialogue with the trade union movement was strengthened and, as already mentioned, allowed Italy to reach Euro convergence criteria and enter into the single currency. CGIL, CISL and UIL were also protagonists of a battle against the secessionism of the League, which put at risk the political unity of Italy, with major demonstrations in Milan and Venice.

=== From 2000 to the Great Recession and the COVID-19 pandemic ===
Berlusconi returned to power after the 2001 general election. His government tried to abolish Article 18 of the Workers' Statute, which protected workers from unjustified dismissal. On 23 March 2002, the CGIL led by Sergio Cofferati announced a great demonstration against the reform. It was the largest mass demonstration in Italian history, with more than three million people gathered at the Circus Maximus in Rome to protest against the abolition of Article 18. The CGIL continued the struggle, proclaiming a general strike for 18 April of the same year, which was later joined by CISL and UIL. After a few weeks the government announced the withdrawal of the reform.

In September 2002, CGIL elected Guglielmo Epifani as the new General Secretary. Epifani continued the fight against Berlusconi's government, started by his predecessor. In particular he launched general strikes against budget laws of 2003 and 2004. After the 2006 general election, Prodi's centre-left, strongly supported by Epifani's CGIL, returned to power. However, he lost the majority after less than two years and Berlusconi became Prime Minister once again after the 2008 general election.

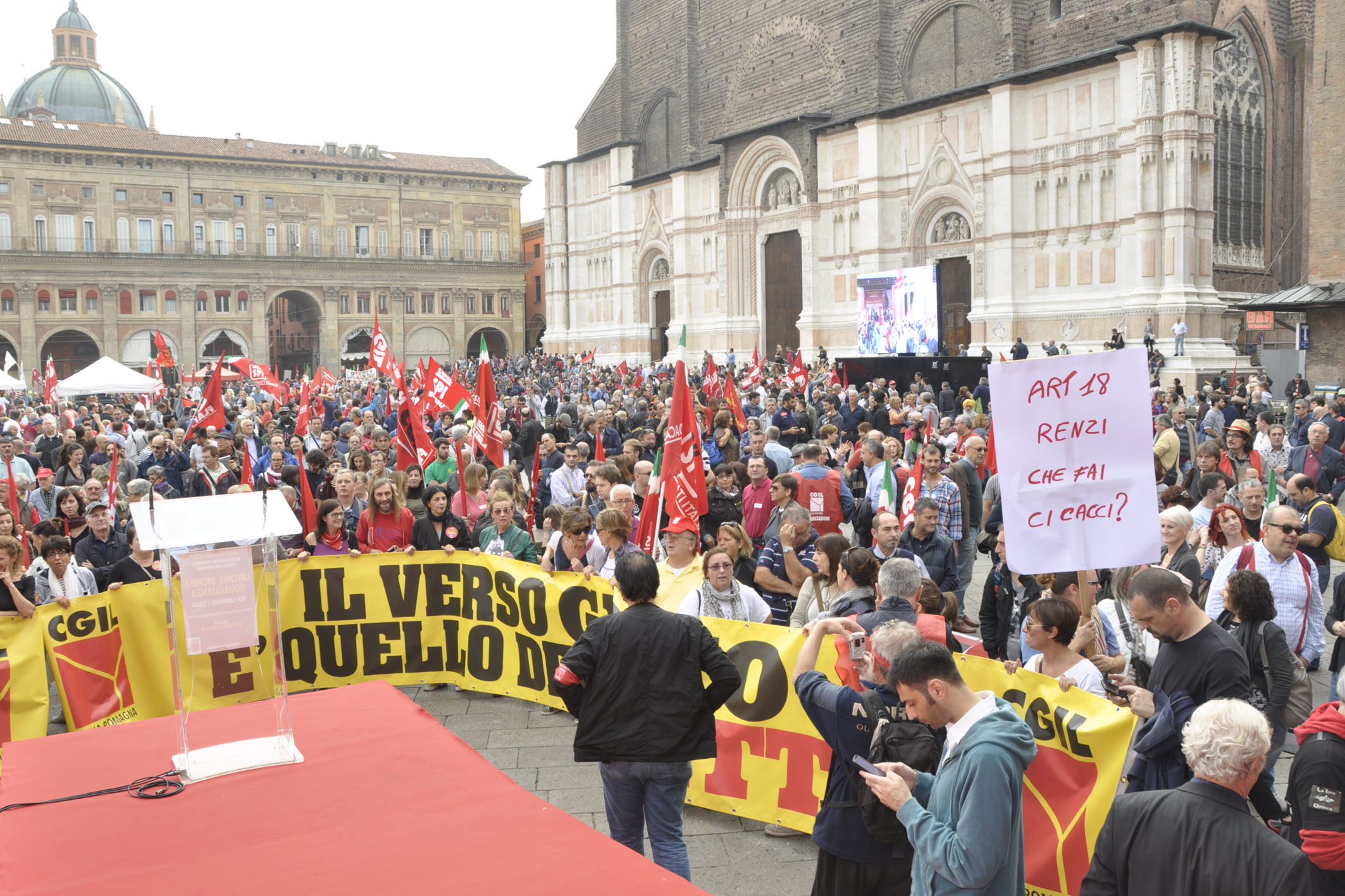
CGIL protest in Bologna against Matteo Renzi's labour reform in 2014.

On 3 November 2010, Susanna Camusso was elected General Secretary; she was the first woman to hold the office. Camusso's secretariat was characterized by the Great Recession and the Euro area crisis, which harshly affected Italy in the early 2010s, leading Berlusconi to resign in November 2011. On 4 December 2011, the technocratic government of Mario Monti introduced emergency austerity measures intended to stem the worsening economic conditions in Italy and restore market confidence, especially after rising Italian government bond yields during the Euro area crisis threatened Italy's financial stability. The austerity package called for increased taxes, pension reform and measures to fight tax evasion. Monti also announced that he would be giving up his own salary as part of the reforms. On 20 January 2012, Monti's government formally adopted a package of reforms targeting Italy's labour market. The reforms were intended to open certain professions to more competition by reforming their licensing systems and abolishing minimum tariffs for their services. Article 18 of Italy's Workers' Statute, which requires companies that employ 15 or more workers to re-hire any employee found to have been fired without just cause, would also be reformed. The proposals faced a strong opposition from Camusso's CGIL and other trade unions, which was followed by public protests, which forced the government to withdraw the amendment on Article 18.

In 2014, Article 18 was finally abolished by the centre-left cabinet of Matteo Renzi as part of a huge labour market reform called the Jobs Act. The proposal was heavily criticised by Camusso, who announced a public protest. On 25 October, almost one million people took part in a mass protest in Rome, organised by the CGIL in opposition to the labour reforms of the government. Some high-profile members of the left-wing faction of the Democratic Party also participated in the protest. On 8 November, more than 100,000 public employees protested in Rome in a demonstration organised by the three trade unions. Despite the mass protests, the Parliament approved the Jobs Act in December 2014. After years of fights to protect Article 18 from the reforms promoted by the centre-right, it was finally abolished by the centre-left, causing a serious break between CGIL and its political counterpart, the Democratic Party.

On 24 January 2019, during the 18th National Congress in Bari, Maurizio Landini, a left-wing populist and former Secretary of FIOM, was elected General Secretary. Landini's main opponent in the Congress, Vincenzo Colla, a reformist and former Regional Secretary of CGIL for Emilia-Romagna, was appointed Vice Secretary. During his inaugural speech, Landini strongly attacked the M5S–League government and especially its Interior Minister, Matteo Salvini, denouncing a serious risk of a return of fascism in the country. On 9 February, CGIL, CISL and UIL protested together in Rome, against the economic measures promoted by Conte's government; more than 200,000s people participated in the march. It was the first time since 2013 that the three trade unions organized a unified rally.

On 9 October 2021, the CGIL's national headquarters in Rome was attacked by a mob of members of the neo-fascist party New Force, who were protesting against the introduction of a COVID-19 vaccination certificate in Italy. Secretary Landini described the attack as an "act of fascist squadrismo".

On 18 March 2023, at the 19th Congress of the CGIL, Landini was re-elected general secretary with 94.2% of votes in favour.

In 2025, CGIL promoted five referendums, concerning changes to the law on the acquisition of Italian citizenship for foreign residents and the repeal of some provisions on employment, three of which were originally introduced by the Jobs Act in 2016.

== General Secretaries ==
N°	Portrait	Name (Born–Died)	Term of office		Tenure (Years and days)	Party
1		Giuseppe Di Vittorio (1892–1957)	3 June 1944	3 November 1957	13 years, 153 days	PCI
2		Agostino Novella (1905–1974)	3 December 1957	24 March 1970	12 years, 111 days	PCI
3		Luciano Lama (1921–1996)	24 March 1970	28 February 1986	15 years, 341 days	PCI
4		Antonio Pizzinato (1932– )	11 March 1986	29 November 1988	2 years, 263 days	PCI
5		Bruno Trentin (1926–2007)	29 November 1988	29 June 1994	5 years, 212 days	PCI/PDS
6		Sergio Cofferati (1948– )	29 June 1994	20 September 2002	8 years, 83 days	PDS/DS
7		Guglielmo Epifani (1950–2021)	20 September 2002	3 November 2010	8 years, 44 days	DS/PD
8		Susanna Camusso (1955– )	3 November 2010	24 January 2019	8 years, 82 days	Ind.
9		Maurizio Landini (1961– )	24 January 2019	Incumbent	7 years, 302 days	Ind.

== National Congresses ==
- 1st National Congress – Florence, Tuscany, 1–7 June 1947
- 2nd National Congress – Genoa, Liguria, 4–9 October 1949
- 3rd National Congress – Naples, Campania, 26 November–3 December 1952
- 4th National Congress – Rome, Lazio, 27 February–4 March 1956
- 5th National Congress – Milan, Lombardy, 2–7 April 1960
- 6th National Congress – Bologna, Emilia-Romagna, 31 March–5 April 1965
- 7th National Congress – Livorno, Tuscany, 16–21 June 1969
- 8th National Congress – Bari, Apulia, 2–7 July 1973
- 9th National Congress – Rimini, Emilia-Romagna, 6–11 June 1977
- 10th National Congress – Rome, Lazio, 16–21 November 1981
- 11th National Congress – Rome, Lazio, 28 February–4 March 1986
- 12th National Congress – Rimini, Emilia-Romagna, 23–27 October 1991
- 13th National Congress – Roma, Lazio, 2–5 July 1996
- 14th National Congress – Rimini, Emilia-Romagna, 6–9 February 2002
- 15th National Congress – Rimini, Emilia-Romagna, 1–4 March 2006
- 16th National Congress – Rimini, Emilia-Romagna, 5–8 May 2010
- 17th National Congress – Rimini, Emilia-Romagna, 6–8 May 2014
- 18th National Congress – Bari, Apulia, 22–24 January 2019
- 19th National Congress – Rimini, Emilia-Romagna, 15–18 March 2023

== Affiliated union federations ==
=== Current affiliates ===
Acronym	Logo	Name	Founded
FIOM		Italian Federation of Metalworkers	1901
SPI		Italian Pensioners' Trade Union	1949
FLAI		Italian Federation of Agroindustrial Workers	1988
FILLEA		Italian Federation of Wood, Building and Industry Workers	1944
FILT		Italian Federation of Transport Workers	1980
FILCTEM		Italian Federation of Chemical, Textile, Energy and Manufacturing Workers	2010
FILCAMS		Italian Federation of Commerce, Hotel and Service Workers	1960
FISAC		Italian Federation of Insurance and Credit Workers	1983
NIDIL		New Labour Identity	1998
SLC		Communication Workers' Union	1996
FLC		Federation of Education Workers	2004
FP		Public Function	1980

=== Former affiliates ===
Union	Abbreviation	Founded	Left	Reason not affiliated	Membership (1954)
Italian Federation of Aqueduct Workers	FILDA	1946	1977	Merged into FNLE	2,188
Italian Federation of Auxiliary Workers	FILAI	1948	1974	Merged into FILCAMS	24,768
Italian Federation of Chemical Workers	FILC	1901	1960	Merged into FILCEP	123,286
Italian Federation of Chemical and Allied Workers	FILCEA	1968	2006	Merged into FILCEM	N/A
Italian Federation of Chemical, Energy and Manufacturing Workers	FILCEM	2006	2009	Merged into FILTCEM	N/A
Italian Federation of Chemical and Oil Workers	FILCEP	1960	1968	Merged into FILCEA	N/A
Italian Federation of Civil Aviation Staff	FIPAC	1944	1980	Merged into FILT	1,110
Italian Federation of Commercial Agents and Travellers	FIARVEP	1945	1979	Merged into FILCAMS	2,052
Italian Federation of Credit Company Employees	FIDAC	1944	1983	Merged into FISAC	23,055
Italian Federation of Electricity Company Employees	FILDAE	1946	1977	Merged into FNLE	34,600
Italian Federation of Employees of Telephone Companies	FIDAT	1946	1983	Merged into FILPT	10,987
Italian Federation of Entertainment Workers	FILS	1944	1981	Merged into FILIS	22,163
Italian Federation of Firemen	FIVF	1944	1962		2,868
Italian Federation of Food Industry Workers	FILIA	1944	1960	Merged into FILZIAT	109,486
Italian Federation of Garment Workers	FILA	1947	1966	Merged into FILTEA	86,837
Italian Federation of Gas Workers	FIDAG	1945	1977	Merged into FNLE	10,725
Italian Federation of Glass and Ceramic Workers	FILCEVA	1945	1968	Merged into FILCEA	54,136
Italian Federation of Hat and Allied Workers	FILCA	1901	1966	Merged into FILTEA	4,087
Italian Federation of Hauliers and Inland Waterways	FIAI	1948	1980	Merged into FILT	84,812
Italian Federation of Hospital Employees	FNO	1946	1958	Merged into FLELS	35,366
Italian Federation of Hotel and Restaurant Workers	FILAM	1945	1960	Merged into FILCAMS	40,800
Italian Federation of Information and Entertainment Workers	FILIS	1981	1996	Merged into SLC	N/A
Italian Federation of Insurance Workers	FILDA	1947	1983	Merged into FISAC	639
Italian Federation of Marine Workers	FILM	1944	1980	Merged into FILT	32,613
Italian Federation of Mining Industry Workers	FILIE	1945	1956	Merged into FILCEP	49,341
Italian Federation of Port Workers	FILP	1944	1980	Merged into FILT	24,351
Italian Federation of Postal and Telecommunication Workers	FILPT	1983	1996	Merged into SLC	N/A
Italian Federation of Paper and Printing Workers	FILPC	1946	1981	Merged into FILIS	59,893
Italian Federation of Public Sector Workers	FIDEP	1946	1980	Merged into PF	8,047
Italian Federation of Sanatorium Workers	FILSA	1951			6,136
Italian Federation of Sugar and Alcohol Industry Employees	FIAIZA	1947	1960	Merged into FILZIAT	8,700
Italian Federation of Sugar, Food Industry and Tobacco Workers	FILZIAT	1960	1988	Merged into FLAI	N/A
Italian Federation of Tax Collectors					4,081
Italian Federation of Textile Workers	FIOT	1901	1966	Merged into FILTEA	172,810
Italian Federation of Textile and Garment Workers	FILTEA	1966	2009	Merged into FILCTEM	N/A
Italian Federation of Trade and Allied Workers	FILCEA	1945	1960	Merged into FILCAMS	69,648
Italian Postal and Telecommunication Federation	FIP	1945	1983	Merged into FILPT	29,043
Italian Railway Union	SFI	1907	1980	Merged into FILT	97,136
Italian Union of Carters	SNBI				4,393
Italian Union of Oil Workers	SILP	1946	1960	Merged into FILCEP	11,411
Italian Union of Railway Contract Workers	SILAF				12,429
National Association of Street Traders	ANVA	1948		Disaffiliated	36,713
National Federation of Agricultural Workers	Federterra	1901	1948	Became umbrella group	N/A
National Federation of Artists, Painters, Sculptors, Engravers and Set Designers					139
National Federation of Energy Workers	FNLE	1977	2006	Merged into FILCEM	N/A
National Federation of Italian Agricultural Labourers and Employees	Federbraccianti	1948	1988	Merged into FLAI	1,084,116
National Federation of Local Authority and Healthcare Workers	FLELS	1946	1980	Merged into PF	84,661
National Federation of Pharmacists					307
National Federation of Sharecroppers	Federmezzadri	1947	1977	Disaffiliated	543,806
National Federation of Wood and Forests					54,694
National Lawyers' Union					77
National School Union	SNS	1967	2004	Merged into FLC	N/A
National State Federation	FNS	1945	1980	Merged into PF	68,699
National Union of Barbers and Hairdressers					3,051
National Union of Newsagents					2,369
National Union of Research	SNR	1973	1997	Merged into SNUR	N/A
National Union of Shipping Company Employees					1,133
National Union of Tobacco	SNT	1948	1960	Merged into FILZIAT	17,938
National Union of Travelling Entertainers					261
National Union of University and Research	SNUR	1997	2004	Merged into FLC	N/A
National University Union	SNU	1986	1997	Merged into SNUR	N/A
Union of Italian Fishermen	SIP	1945	1956	Merged into FILM	9,113
Union of Porters and Assistants	SINFA	1952	1980	Merged into FILT	17,285
United Union of Central Bank Staff	USPIE	1945	1983	Merged into FISAC	2,248

== Formally associated bodies ==
Acronym	Logo	Name	Chair
AGENQUADRI		General Association of Managers	Paolo Terranova
Auser		Self-management Services	Enzo Costa
Federconsumatori		Consumer Federation	Emilio Viafora
RSM		Rete degli Studenti Medi	Giammarco Manfreda
UdU		University Students' Union	Enrico Gulluni

== Symbols ==
CGIL logo

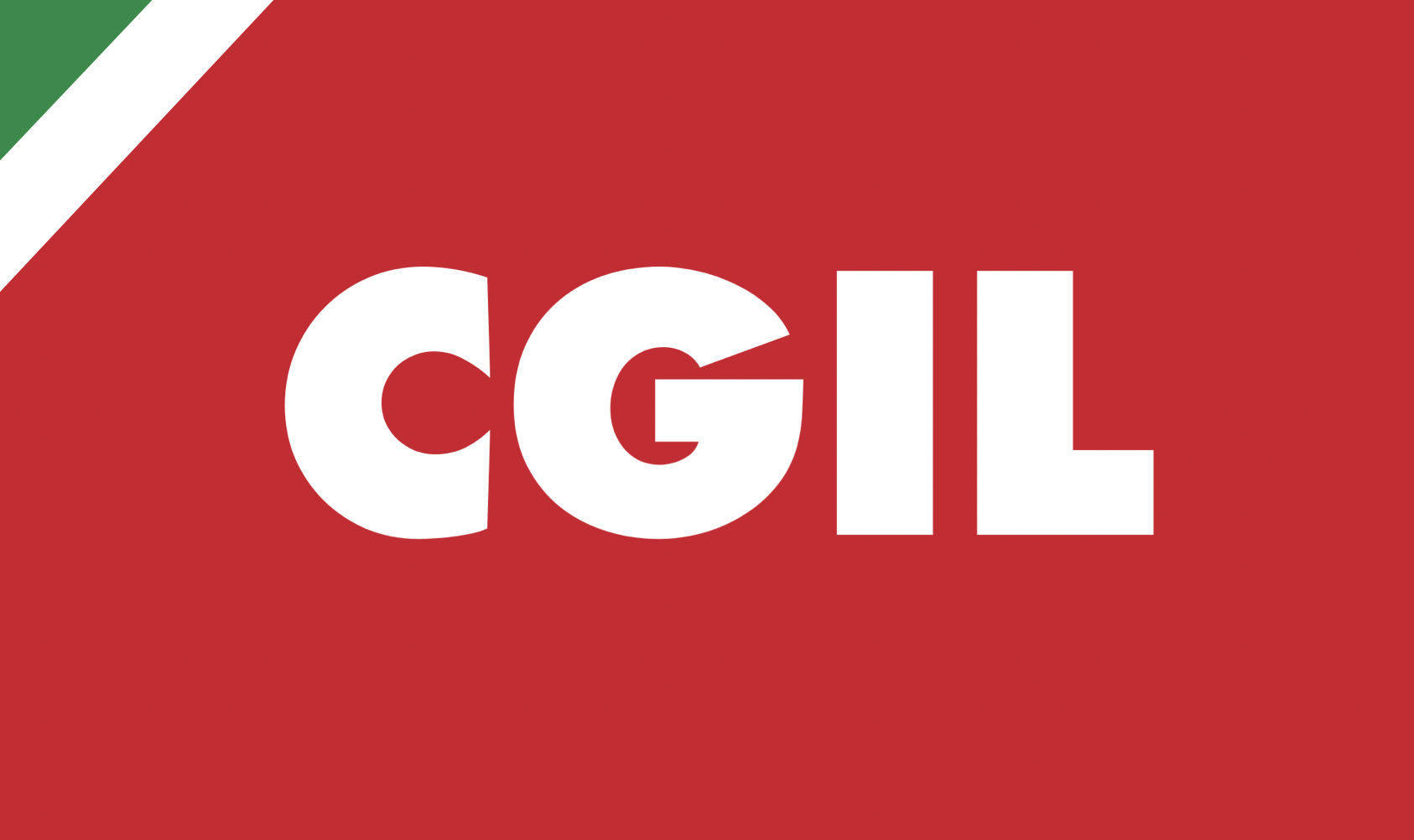
CGIL flag

== See also ==
- CISL
- UIL
- Rete degli Studenti Medi
