= Italian Railway Union =

Railway Union in Italy

The Italian Railway Union (Italian: Sindacato Ferrovieri Italiani, SFI) was a trade union representing railway workers in Italy.

The union was founded in 1907, and affiliated to the General Confederation of Labour, but it was banned by the fascist government in 1925. The union was re-established in 1944, affiliating to the new Italian General Confederation of Labour (CGIL), and by 1954, it had 97,136 members. In 1970, it affiliated to CGIL's new Italian Federation of Transport Trade Unions.

The union's membership remained fairly constant, and by 1979, it was 97,047. In 1980, it merged with the Italian Federation of Hauliers and Inland Waterways, the Italian Federation of Civil Aviation Staff, the Union of Porters and Assistants, the Italian Federation of Marine Workers, and the Italian Federation of Port Workers, to form the Italian Federation of Transport Workers.

== General Secretaries ==
1945: Cesare Masini
1960: Renato Degli Esposti
1976: Sergio Mezzanotte
