= Guglielmo Epifani =

Italian trade unionist and politician (1950–2021)

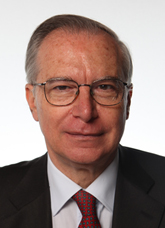

Secretary of the Democratic Party
- In office 11 May 2013 – 15 December 2013
- Preceded by: Pier Luigi Bersani
- Succeeded by: Matteo Renzi

General Secretary of the CGIL
- In office 20 September 2002 – 3 November 2010
- Preceded by: Sergio Cofferati
- Succeeded by: Susanna Camusso

Member of the Chamber of Deputies
- In office 15 March 2013 – 7 June 2021

Personal details
- Born: Ettore Guglielmo Epifani; 24 March 1950 Rome, Italy
- Died: 7 June 2021 (aged 71) Rome, Italy
- Party: Art.1 (2017–2021)
- Other political affiliations: PSI (before 1994); DS (1998–2007); PD (2007–2017)
- Education: Sapienza University of Rome
- Profession: Trade unionist

Guglielmo Epifani (24 March 1950 – 7 June 2021) was an Italian trade unionist and politician. From 2002 to 2010, he was the General Secretary of the Italian General Confederation of Labour (CGIL), which was the biggest trade union in Europe. On 11 May 2013, Epifani was appointed secretary of the Democratic Party (PD).

== Biography ==
Epifani was born in Rome in 1950. In 1953 the family moved to Milan and then returned to Rome, in the Talenti neighbourhood, where Epifani finished secondary school at a Liceo classico, obtaining a classical education diploma in 1969. In 1973 he graduated from the Sapienza University of Rome in Philosophy with a thesis on Anna Kuliscioff and subsequently enrolled in the CGIL, where he worked as a trade unionist. In 1974 he directed the publishing house of the Confederation, the Esi, significantly increasing its personal prestige within the confederation: within two years he landed at the Office of Auditors, where he coordinated the contractual policies of the categories, and then all Industry Bureau of the Confederacy.

Epifani was a member of the Italian Socialist Party (PSI). In 1979 he began his career as a union leader with the post of Secretary-General of the category of Printing and paper manufacturers. In 1990 he joined the confederate and in 1993 was appointed Deputy Secretary-General by Bruno Trentin. He was writing before the Italian Socialist Party and, after the end of the PSI, the Democrats of the Left.

Following the termination of the mandate of Sergio Cofferati, Deputy of the union from 1994 to 2002, Epifani became General Secretary of CGIL, the most important Italian trade union, the first Socialist to lead it since its reconstitution in 1944. On 16 October 2010 Guglielmo Epifani delivered his last speech as secretary of the CGIL in Piazza San Giovanni in Rome, on the occasion of the event FIOM. On 3 November 2010, the leadership of the CGIL was handed over to Susanna Camusso first woman secretary of the CGIL.

Subsequent to the 2013 Italian general election, Epifani was elected to the Chamber of Deputies as a candidate of the Democratic Party in the constituency list Campania I. On 11 May 2013, Epifani became Secretary of the party, with the mission of leading the party to the convention. He was the first former Socialist to have led the PD.

Epifani was re-elected to the Chamber of Deputies in the 2018 Italian general election, among the ranks of the Free and Equal list.
