= Italian Federation of Information and Entertainment Workers =

Trade union of Italy

The Italian Federation of Information and Entertainment Workers (Italian: Federazione Italiana Lavoratori dell'Informazione e dello Spettacolo, FILIS) was a trade union representing workers in the printing and entertainment industries in Italy.

The union was founded in 1981, when the Italian Federation of Entertainment Workers merged with the Italian Federation of Paper and Printing Workers. Like its predecessors, it affiliated to the Italian General Confederation of Labour. By 1995, the union had 53,327 members.

In 1996, the union merged with the Italian Federation of Postal and Telecommunication Workers, to form the Communication Workers' Union.

== General Secretaries ==
1981: Giorgio Colzi
1983: Guglielmo Epifani
1989: Massimo Bordini
