= Italian Federation of Insurance and Credit Workers =

Italian trade union for the financial sector

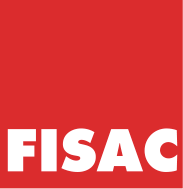
Logo of the union

The Italian Federation of Insurance and Credit Workers (Italian: Federazione Italiana Sindacato Assicurazioni e Credito, FISAC) is a trade union representing workers in the finance sector in Italy.

The union was founded in 1983, when the Italian Federation of Credit Company Employees merged with the Italian Federation of Insurance Workers, and the United Union of Central Bank Staff. Like all its predecessors, it affiliated to the Italian General Confederation of Labour. By 1996, it had 76,951 members, of whom half worked in banking, and half in insurance.

== General Secretaries ==
1983: Tebaldo Zirulia
1988: Nicoletta Rocchi
2000: Marcello Tocco
2002: Domenico Moccia
2010: Agostino Megale
