= Italian Federation of Chemical, Textile, Energy and Manufacturing Workers =

Trade union of Italy

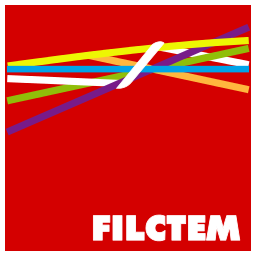
Logo of FILCTEM

The Italian Federation of Chemical, Textile, Energy and Manufacturing Workers Italian: Federazione Italiana Lavoratori Chimica Tessile Energia Manifatture, FILCTEM) is a trade union representing manufacturing workers in Italy.

The union was founded in October 2009, when the Italian Federation of Chemical, Energy and Manufacturing Workers merged with the Italian Federation of Textile and Garment Workers. Like its predecessors, it affiliated to the Italian General Confederation of Labour. It initially had more than 250,000 members.

== General Secretaries ==
2009: Alberto Morselli
2012: Emilio Miceli
2019: Marco Falcinelli
