= Antonio Pizzinato =

Italian trade unionist and politician

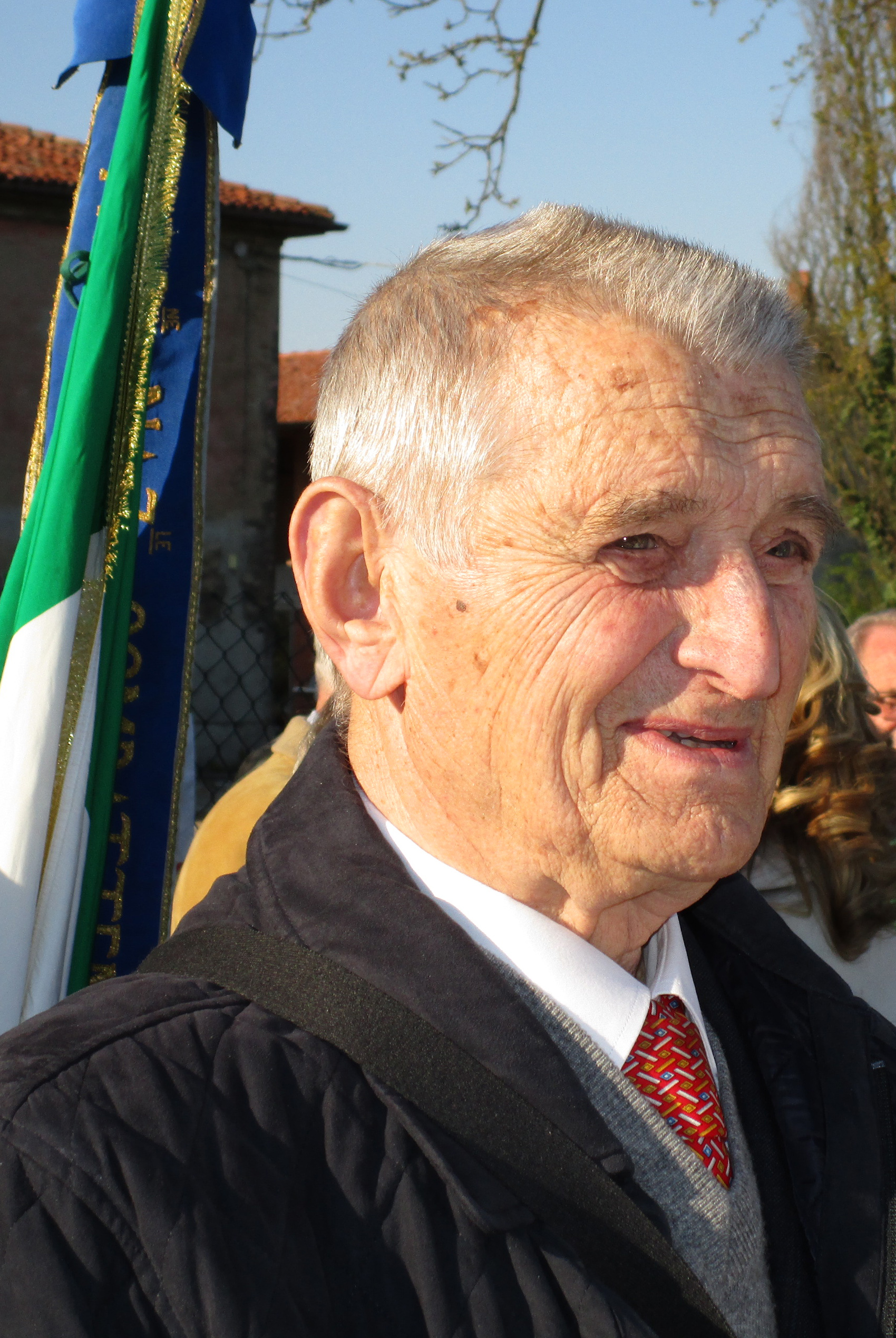

General Secretary of CGIL
- In office 1 March 1986 – 29 November 1988
- Preceded by: Luciano Lama
- Succeeded by: Bruno Trentin

Member of the Senate of the Republic
- In office 9 May 1996 – 27 April 2006
- Constituency: Lombardy

Member of the Chamber of Deputies
- In office 23 April 1992 – 14 April 1994
- Constituency: Milan

Personal details
- Born: 8 October 1932 (age 92); Caneva, Italy
- Political party: PCI (before 1991); PDS (1991–1998); DS (1998–2007); SEL (2010–2016); SI (2017–present)
- Profession: Trade unionist, politician

Antonio Pizzinato (born 8 October 1932) is an Italian trade unionist and politician, General Secretary of Italian General Confederation of Labour from 1986 to 1988.

== Biography ==
Pizzinato joined both the Italian General Confederation of Labour and the Italian Communist Party in 1947 and went to study Economy and Sociology at the Moscow State University, though he didn't graduate since he only had the Primary school diploma.

=== Career in the CGIL ===
Once he returned to Italy in 1961, Pizzinato began his career in the CGIL, being appointed Secretary-general of the trade union in March 1986. He held the office for only two years.

=== Deputy, city councilor, senator and undersecretary ===
Pizzinato is elected for the first time to the Chamber of Deputies at the 1992 general election with the Democratic Party of the Left.

In 1994, Pizzinato was elected to the city council of Sesto San Giovanni, leaving the office in 1996 when he was elected Senator. Again in 1996, Pizzinato was appointed undersecretary at the Ministry of Labour during the Prodi I Cabinet. He will be re-elected to the Senate with the Democrats of the Left at the 2001 general election.

=== Later years ===
In 2007, Pizzinato, being contrary to the birth of the Democratic Party, adhered to Fabio Mussi's motion to leave the Democrats of the Left and join, a few years later, Left Ecology Freedom. Since 2007, Pizzinato is president of the Lombardy section of the National Association of Italian Partisans.
