= National Federation of Energy Workers =

Trade union of Italy

The National Federation of Energy Workers (Italian: Federazione Nazionale dei Lavoratori dell'Energia, FNLE) was a trade union representing workers in the energy industry in Italy.

The union was founded in 1977, when the Italian Federation of Electricity Company Employees merged with the Italian Federation of Gas Industry Employees, and the Italian Federation of Aqueduct Workers. Like its predecessors, the union affiliated to the Italian General Confederation of Labour.

By 1998, the union had 48,326 members. In February 2006, it merged with the Italian Federation of Chemical and Allied Workers, to form the Italian Federation of Chemical, Energy and Manufacturing Workers.

== General Secretaries ==
1977: Giorgio Bucci
1988: Andrea Amaro
1996: Giacomo Berni
