= Italian Federation of Transport Workers =

Trade union of Italy

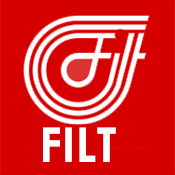
Logo of the union

The Italian Federation of Transport Workers (Italian: Federazione Italiana Lavoratori Trasporti, FILT) is a trade union representing workers in the transportation sector in Italy.

In 1970, the Italian General Confederation of Labour established the Italian Federation of Transport Trade Unions, which loosely grouped the Italian Federation of Hauliers and Inland Waterways, the Italian Railway Union, the Italian Federation of Civil Aviation Staff, the Union of Porters and Assistants, the Italian Federation of Marine Workers, and the Italian Federation of Port Workers. In 1980, these unions merged into a reconstituted "Italian Federation of Transport Workers".

By 1998, the union had 130,692 members, of whom 38% worked in the rail industry.

== General Secretaries ==
1980: Lucio Di Carlini
1986: Luciano Mancini
1994: Paolo Brutti
1997: Guido Abbadessa
2003: Fabrizio Solari
2008: Franco Nasso
2017: Alessandro Rocchi
2019: Stefano Malorgio
