= Luciano Lama =

Italian trade unionist and politician (1921–1996)

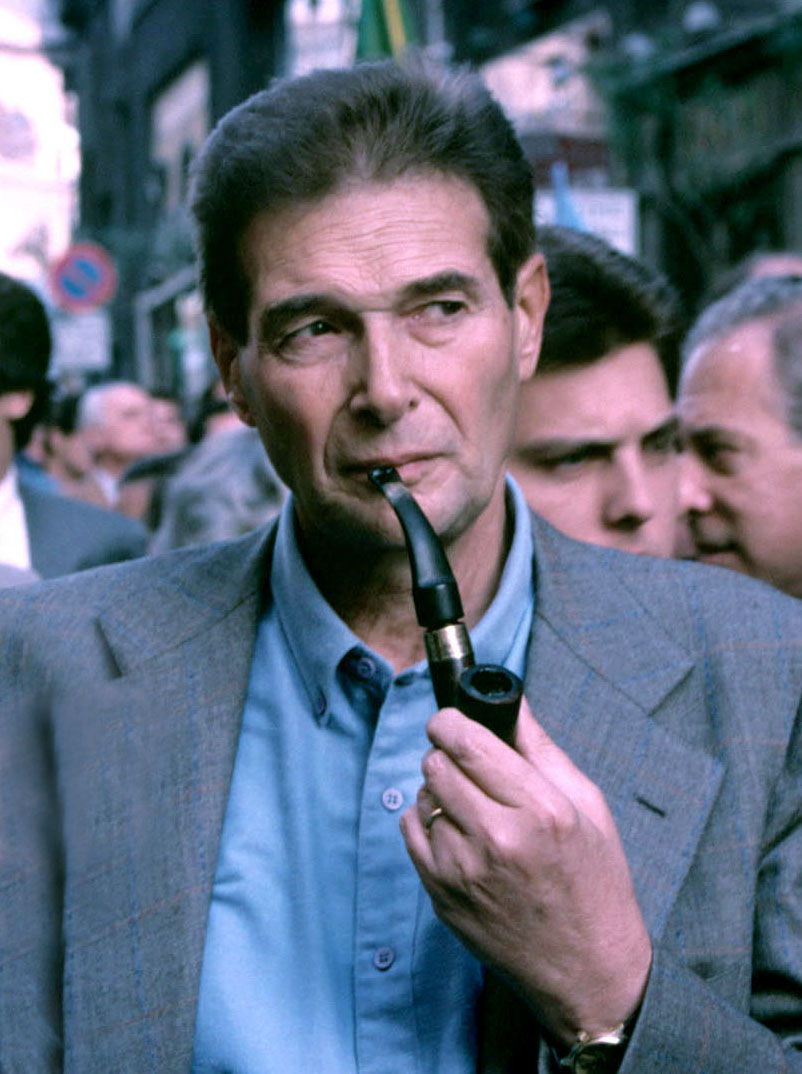

General Secretary of CGIL
- In office 24 March 1970 – 28 February 1986
- Preceded by: Agostino Novella
- Succeeded by: Antonio Pizzinato

Mayor of Amelia
- In office 17 July 1989 – 31 May 1996
- Preceded by: Giulio Ippoliti
- Succeeded by: Fabrizio Bellini

Member of the Senate of the Republic
- In office 2 July 1987 – 14 April 1994
- Constituency: Forlì-Faenza (1987–1992); Orvieto (1992–1994)

Member of the Chamber of Deputies
- In office 12 June 1958 – 2 July 1969
- Constituency: Bologna

Personal details
- Born: 14 October 1921 Gambettola, Italy
- Died: 31 May 1996 (aged 74) Rome, Italy
- Party: PSI (before 1946); PCI (1946–1991); PDS (1991–1996)
- Education: University of Florence
- Profession: Trade unionist, politician

Luciano Lama (14 October 1921 – 31 May 1996) was an Italian trade unionist and politician, General Secretary of Italian General Confederation of Labour from 1970 to 1986.

== Biography ==
=== Role in the resistance ===
Lama graduated in Political Sciences at the University of Florence under the name of Boris Alberti, since he had to remain anonymous because he refused to join the Republic of Salò. When he was very young, Lama joined the Italian Socialist Party and took part in the resistance movement, contributing to free the city of Forlì from the Nazis.

=== Deputy and secretary of the CGIL ===
In 1946, Lama joined the Italian Communist Party, with which he was elected to the Chamber of Deputies in 1958, in 1963 and in 1968. He left his seat when he joined the Italian General Confederation of Labour, being elected Secretary-general of the trade union in 1970.

On 17 February 1977, Lama was violently contested at the University of Rome by a group of young people, who adhered to extra-parliamentary positions.

In January 1978, in an assembly at the EUR in Rome, Lama proposed to the workers a politics of sacrifice, aimed at healing the Italian economy. At the end of his secretary, in 1986, the CGIL was strengthened in terms of political influence as it became the main point of reference for most of the employees.

=== Senator ===
In 1987, Lama was elected with the Communist Party to the Senate and was re-elected in 1992 with the Democratic Party of the Left. From 9 July 1987 to 14 April 1994, Lama was appointed Vice-president of the Senate.

=== Mayor experience and death ===
In 1989, Lama was elected Mayor of Amelia, a town in the province of Terni, and was re-elected in 1994, when he became the first Mayor elected directly by the people of Amelia, receiving support by the whole Alliance of Progressives.

Lama died in office on 31 May 1996, at the age of 74, after a long illness. He is now buried in the Verano Cemetery.

== Electoral history ==
| Election | House | Constituency | Party | Votes | Result |
|---|---|---|---|---|---|
| 1958 | Chamber of Deputies | Bologna–Ferrara–Ravenna–Forlì | PCI | 32,699 | Elected |
| 1963 | Chamber of Deputies | Bologna–Ferrara–Ravenna–Forlì | PCI | 26,332 | Elected |
| 1968 | Chamber of Deputies | Bologna–Ferrara–Ravenna–Forlì | PCI | 25,513 | Elected |
| 1987 | Senate of the Republic | Emilia-Romagna – Forlì-Faenza | PCI | 63,037 | Elected |
| 1992 | Senate of the Republic | Umbria – Orvieto | PDS | 19,974 | Elected |

Trade union offices
| Preceded by Agostino Novella | General Secretary of the Italian Federation of Metalworkers; 1957–1961 | Succeeded by Bruno Trentin |
