= Pavie =

- Commune
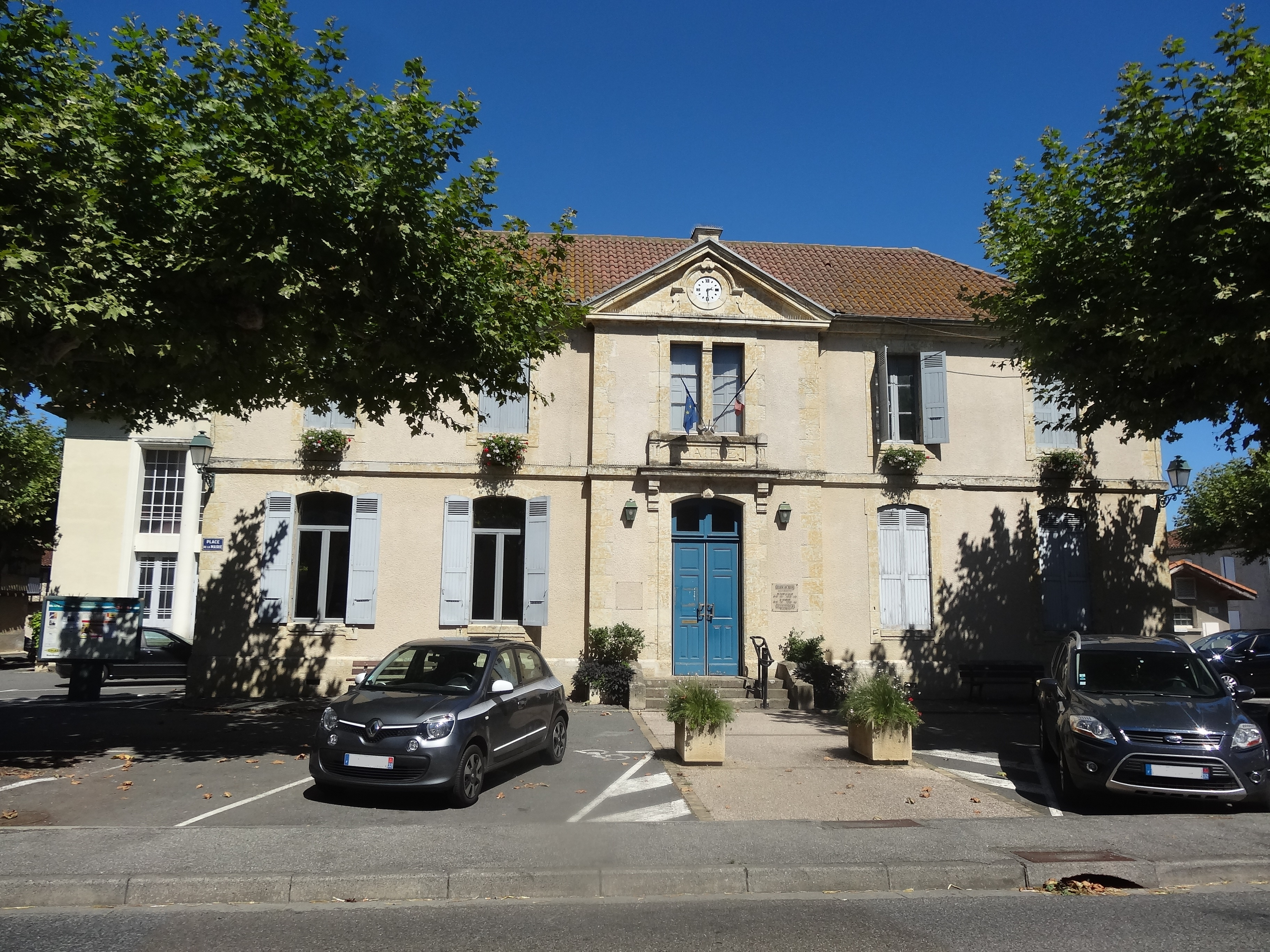
- The town hall in Pavie

- Coat of arms
- Location of Pavie
- Location within France Location within Occitanie
- Coordinates: 43°36′39″N 0°35′34″E
- Country: France
- Region: Occitania
- Department: Gers
- Arrondissement: Auch
- Canton: Auch-1
- Intercommunality: CA Grand Auch Cœur Gascogne

Government
  - Mayor (2020–2026): Jean-Michel Blay
- Area^{1}: 24.67 km^{2} (9.53 sq mi)
- Elevation: 140 m (460 ft)
- Highest elevation: 260 m (850 ft)
- Lowest elevation: 132 m (433 ft)
- Population (2023): 2,566
  - Density: 104.0/km^{2} (269.4/sq mi)
- Time zone: UTC+01:00 (CET)
  - Summer (DST): UTC+02:00 (CEST)
- INSEE/Postal code: 32307 /32550
- ^{1} French Land Register data, which excludes lakes, ponds, glaciers > 1 km^{2} (0.386 sq mi or 247 acres) and river estuaries.

Pavie (French pronunciation: [pavi]; Gascon: Pavia) is a commune in the Gers department in southwestern France.

== Geography ==
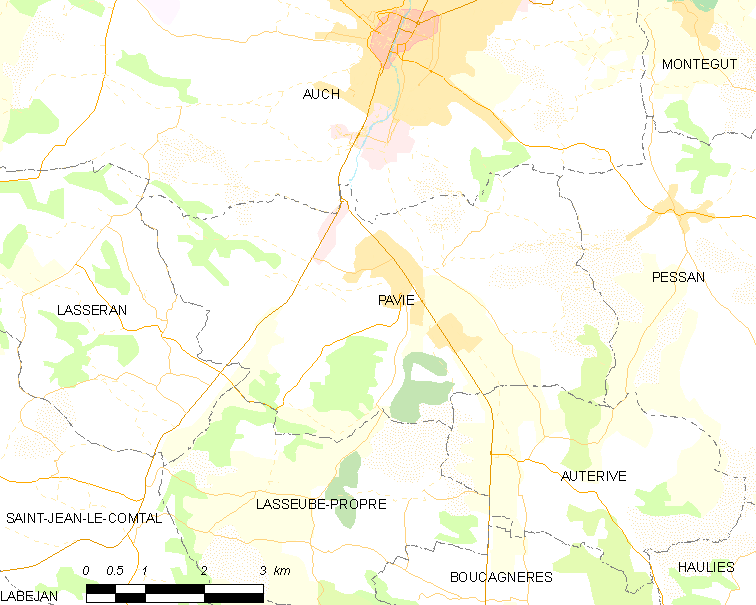
Pavie and its surrounding communes

== Natives ==
- Bruno Trentin

== Population ==
Historical population
Year	Pop.	±% p.a.
1968	1,005	—
1975	1,539	+6.28%
1982	1,699	+1.42%
1990	2,196	+3.26%
1999	2,222	+0.13%
2007	2,341	+0.65%
2012	2,414	+0.62%
2017	2,486	+0.59%
2023	2,566	+0.53%
Source: INSEE

== See also ==
- Communes of the Gers department
