= New Labour Identity =

Trade union of Italy

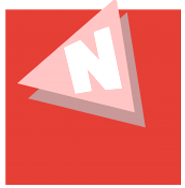
Logo of the union

New Labour Identity (Italian: Nuove Identità di Lavoro, NIdiL) is a trade union representing freelance workers and those on zero hours contracts in Italy.

The union was established in 1998 as part of the Italian General Confederation of Labour. While representing all precarious workers, many of its members are young workers. It campaigns for improved rights for its members, and for their access to credit and benefits such as pensions. It was prominent in highlighting the difficulties many precarious workers faced during the COVID-19 pandemic.

== General Secretaries ==
- 1998: Cesare Minghini
- 2001: Emilio Viafora
- 2006: Filomena Trizio
- 2013: Claudio Treves
- 2018: Andrea Borghesi
