= Italian Federation of Commerce, Hotel and Service Workers =

Trade union of Italy

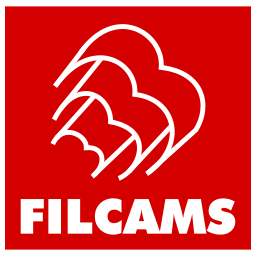
Logo of the union

The Italian Federation of Commerce, Hotel and Service Workers (Italian: Federazione Italiana Lavoratori Commercio Albergo Mensa e Servizi, FILCAMS) is a trade union representing workers in the service sector in Italy.

The union was founded in 1960, when the Italian Federation of Trade and Allied Workers merged with the Italian Federation of Hotel and Cafe Workers. Like its predecessors, it affiliated to the Italian General Confederation of Labour. By 2023, it had 599.607 members, of whom 41,10% worked in commerce, 36,46% in the services sector and 22,44% in the tourism industry.

== General Secretaries ==
1960: Alieto Cortesi
1972: Domenico Gotta
1981: Gilberto Pasucci
1991: Aldo Amoretti
1999: Ivano Corraini
2008: Francesco Martini
2015: Maria Grazia Gabrielli
2023: Fabrizio Russo
