= Italian Federation of Chemical and Allied Workers =

Trade union of Italy

Logo of the union

The Italian Federation of Chemical and Allied Workers (Italian: Federazione Italiana Lavoratori Chimici ed Affini, FILCEA) was a trade union representing chemical and some manufacturing workers in Italy.

The union was founded in December 1968, when the Italian Federation of Chemical and Oil Workers merged with the Federation of Glass and Ceramics. Like its predecessors, it affiliated to the Italian General Confederation of Labour.

By 1998, the union had 128,566 members, of whom 90% worked in the chemical industry, and most of the remainder in glass and ceramics. In February 2006, the union merged with the National Federation of Energy Workers, to form the Italian Federation of Chemical, Energy and Manufacturing Workers.

== General Secretaries ==
1968: Giovan Battista Trespidi
1977: Fausto Vigevani
1981: Ettore Masucci
1986: Giuliano Cazzola
1988: Sergio Cofferati
1990: Franco Chiriaco
2000: Edoardo Guarino
2002: Mauro Guzzonato
2003: Giacomo Berni
2004: Alberto Morselli
