= Italian Federation of Metalworkers =

Trade union of Italy

FIOM
- Italian Federation of Metalworkers
- Federazione Impiegati; Operai Metallurgici
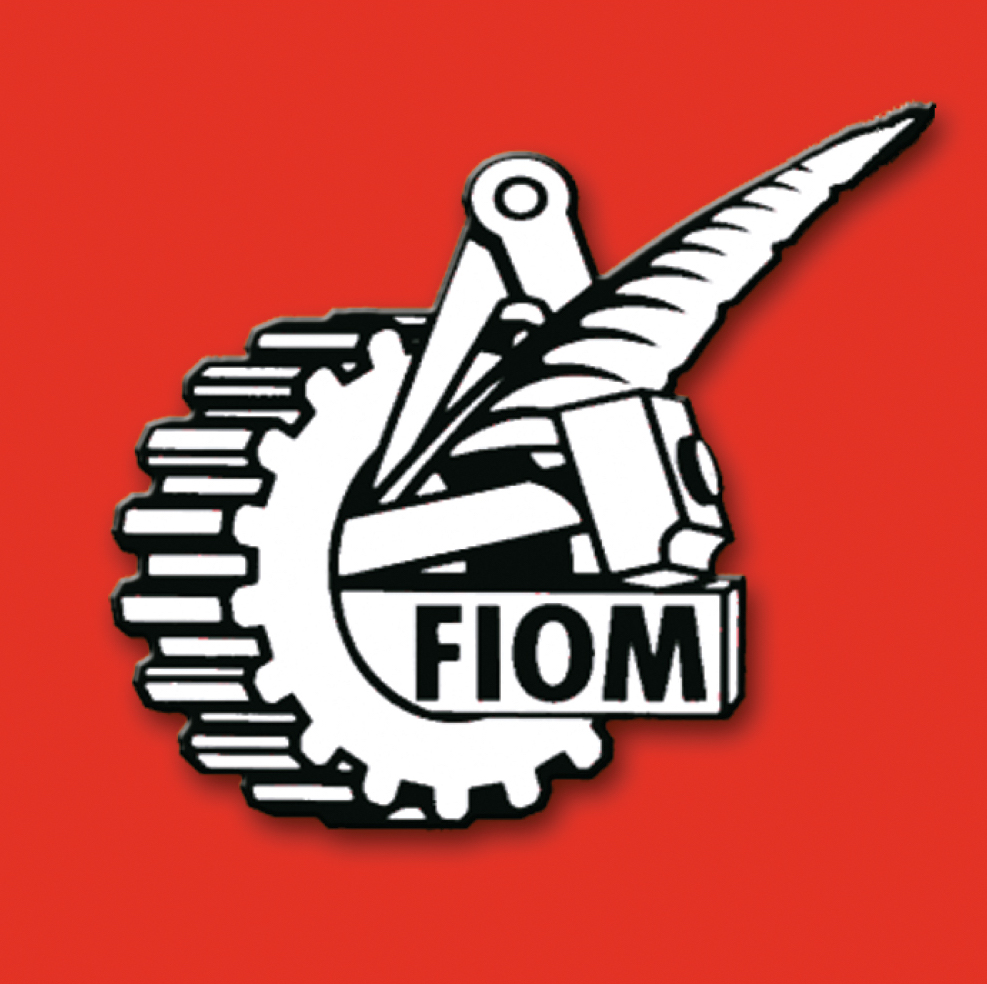
- Founded: 16 June 1901
- Headquarters: Corso Trieste, 36; 00198 Rome, Italy
- Location: Italy
- Members: 351,432 (2011)
- Key people: Francesca Re David (General Secretary)
- Website: www.fiom-cgil.it

The Italian Federation of Metalworkers (Italian: Federazione Impiegati Operai Metallurgici, FIOM) is a trade union representing workers in the metal and engineering industries in Italy.

The union was founded at a conference in Livorno, on 16 June 1901. In 1906, it was a founding affiliate of the General Confederation of Labour. Membership grew steadily, and by 1916, it had reached 22,445. In 1919, the union signed an agreement limiting working hours to a maximum of 48 a week. It was banned by the fascist government in 1924.

The union was re-established in 1944, and affiliated to the new Italian General Confederation of Labour. By 1946, it had 638,697 members. Although both the social democratic and Christian democratic groups soon split away, by 1949, the union still claimed 609,094 members. By 1998, membership had declined to 365,942.

== General Secretaries ==
1901: Ernesto Verzi
1907: Silla Coccia and Cleobulo Rossi
1908: Bruno Buozzi
1924: Union banned
1944: Giovanni Parodi
1945: Antonio Negro
1946: Giovanni Roveda
1955: Agostino Novella
1957: Luciano Lama
1961: Bruno Trentin
1977: Pio Galli
1985: Sergio Garavini
1987: Angelo Airoldi
1991: Fausto Vigevani
1994: Claudio Sabattini
2002: Gianni Rinaldini
2010: Maurizio Landini
2017: Francesca Re David
