= Rinaldo Rigola =

Italian union leader and politician (1868–1954)

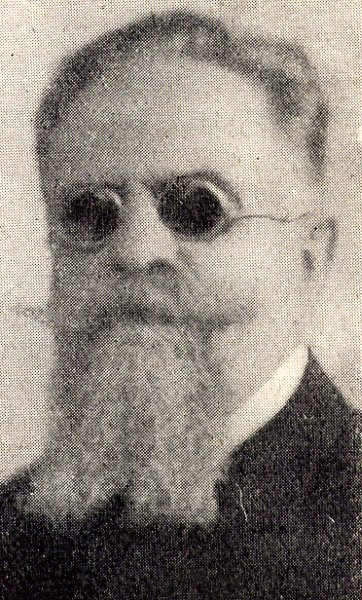

Member of the Chamber of Deputies
- In office 16 June 1900 – 8 February 1909

Secretary General of the General Confederation of Labour
- In office 1906–1918

Personal details
- Born: 2 February 1868 Biella, Kingdom of Italy
- Died: 10 January 1954 (aged 85) Milan, Italy
- Party: POI (1886–1893); PSI (1893–1922); PSU (1922–1925)
- Occupation: Metal worker

Rinaldo Rigola (2 February 1868 – 10 January 1954) was an Italian socialist politician who served as the founding secretary general of the General Confederation of Labour (CGdL) in 1906.

== Early life, career and activities ==
Rigola was born in Biella on 2 February 1868. He was a metal worker. He became a member of the Italian Workers' Party (POI) in 1886. He left the POI and joined the Italian Socialist Party (PSI) in 1893. In the PSI, Rigola was part of its reformist faction. He served as the municipal councilor in Biella in 1895 and as the director of the newspaper Corriere Biellese in 1896. That same year, he was forced to exile and settled in Switzerland where he stayed until 1900.

Shortly after his return to Italy, Rigola was elected a deputy, being the first Italian worker at the Parliament of the Kingdom of Italy. He wrote about trade union topics in the newspaper Avanti and then directed a magazine entitled Vita workeria. In 1903, Rigola lost his sight completely as a result of an accident during his youth.

In 1906, Rigola became founding secretary general of the CGdL. He resigned from the post in 1918. In 1922, he cofounded the Unitary Socialist Party (PSU). Rigola launched a magazine entitled Il Lavoro in Biella in 1924. He also headed a cultural organization, the National Association for the Questions of Labour, which was associated with the magazine.

== Later years and death ==
Rigola retired from public life in 1940. He died in Milan on 10 January 1954.

== Views and legacy ==
Rigola was a supporter of the guild socialism developed by G. D. H. Cole. He did not openly approve fascist corporatism. In 2012, a biography of Rigola was published, Rinaldo Rigola. Una biografia politica, by Paolo Mattera.
