= Italian Federation of Postal and Telecommunication Workers =

Trade union of Italy

The Italian Federation of Postal and Telecommunication Workers (Italian: Federazione Italiana Lavoratori Poste e Telecomunicazioni, FILPT) was a trade union representing workers in the communications industry in Italy.

The union was founded in 1983, when the Italian Postal and Telecommunication Federation merged with the Italian Federation of Employees of Telephone Companies. Like its predecessors, it affiliated to the Italian General Confederation of Labour. By 1995, the union had 41,956 members.

In 1996, the union merged with the Italian Federation of Information and Entertainment Workers, to form the Communication Workers' Union.

== General Secretaries ==
1983: Gianfranco Testi
1990: Carmelo Romeo
