= Communication Workers' Union (Italy) =

Trade union of Italy

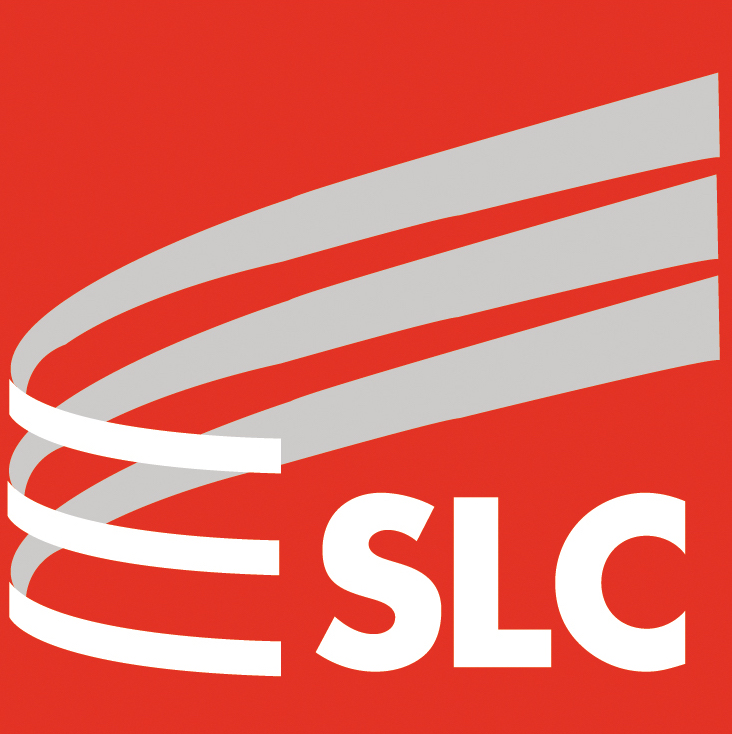
Logo of the SLC

The Communication Workers' Union (Italian: Sindacato Lavoratori della Comunicazione, SLC) is a trade union representing workers in the printing, communications and entertainment industries in Italy.

The union was founded in 1996, when the Italian Federation of Postal and Telecommunication Workers merged with the Italian Federation of Information and Entertainment Workers. Like its predecessors, the union affiliated to the Italian General Confederation of Labour. By 1998, the union had 90,757 members.

The Italian Actors' Union, Italian Union of Cartoonists and National Union of Italian Newspapers are affiliated with the SLC.

== General Secretaries ==
1996: Fulvio Fammoni
2004: Emilio Miceli
2012: Massimo Cestaro
2017: Fabrizio Solari
