= Italian Federation of Chemical, Energy and Manufacturing Workers =

Trade union of Italy

Logo of the union

The Italian Federation of Chemical, Energy and Manufacturing Workers Italian: Federazione Italiana Lavoratori Chimici, dell'Energia e delle Manifatture, FILCEM) was a trade union representing manufacturing workers in Italy.

The union was founded on 1 February 2006, when the Italian Federation of Chemical and Allied Workers merged with the National Federation of Energy Workers. Like its predecessors, it affiliated to the Italian General Confederation of Labour.

In October 2009, the union merged with the Italian Federation of Textile and Garment Workers, to form the Italian Federation of Chemical, Textile, Energy and Manufacturing Workers.

== General Secretaries ==
2006: Alberto Morselli
