= Italian Federation of Wood, Building and Allied Workers =

Trade union of Italy

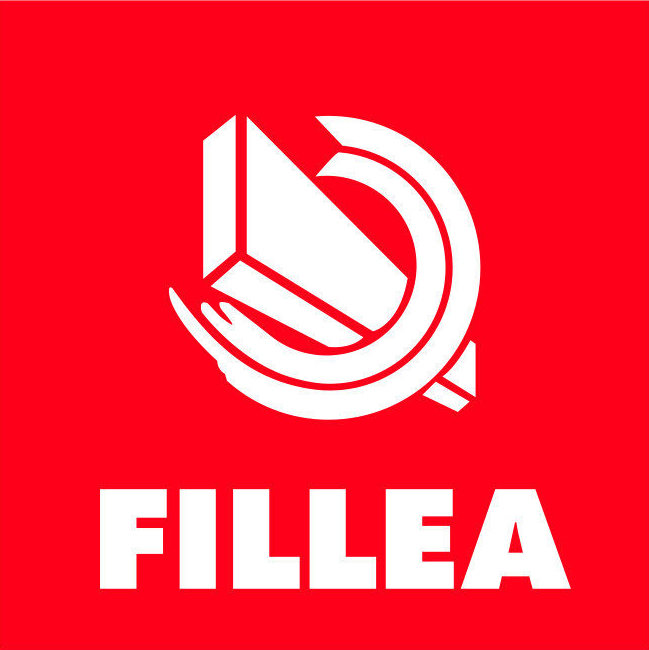
Logo of the union

The Italian Federation of Wood, Building and Allied Workers (Italian: Federazione Italiana Lavoratori Legno Edili e Affini, FILLEA) is a trade union representing construction workers in Italy.

The union was refounded in 1944 as the Italian Federation of Building Workers, an affiliate of the Italian General Confederation of Labour. By 1954, it claimed 455,000 members, although by 1998, this had fallen to 289,553. Of those, about 70% worked in construction, and most of the remainder in wood manufacturing and processing.

== General Secretaries ==
1946: Osvaldo Benci
1949: Otello Putinati
1952: Rinaldo Scheda
1958: Elio Capadaglio
1966: Claudio Cianca
1969: Claudio Truffi
1981: Annio Breschi
1985: Roberto Tonini
1992: Carla Cantone
2000: Franco Martini
2008: Walter Schiavella
2016: Alessandro Genovesi
