= Italian Federation of Credit Company Employees =

Trade union of Italy

The Italian Federation of Credit Company Employees (Italian: Federazione Italiana Dipendenti Aziende di Credito, FIDAC) was a trade union representing workers in the finance sector in Italy, principally in banking.

The union was founded on 3 November 1944 at meeting in Rome. It affiliated to the newly-founded Italian General Confederation of Labour. By 1954, it had 23,055 members.

In 1972, the National Union of Debt Collectors merged into FIDAC. The union grew steadily, and by 1983, it had 50,229 members. That year, it merged with the Italian Federation of Insurance Workers and the United Union of Central Bank Staff, to form the Italian Federation of Insurance and Credit Workers.

== General Secretaries ==
1944: Bruno Oggiano
1972: Giuseppe Pullara
1981: Tullio Rimoldi
