= Bruno Trentin =

Italian trade unionist and politician (1926–2007)

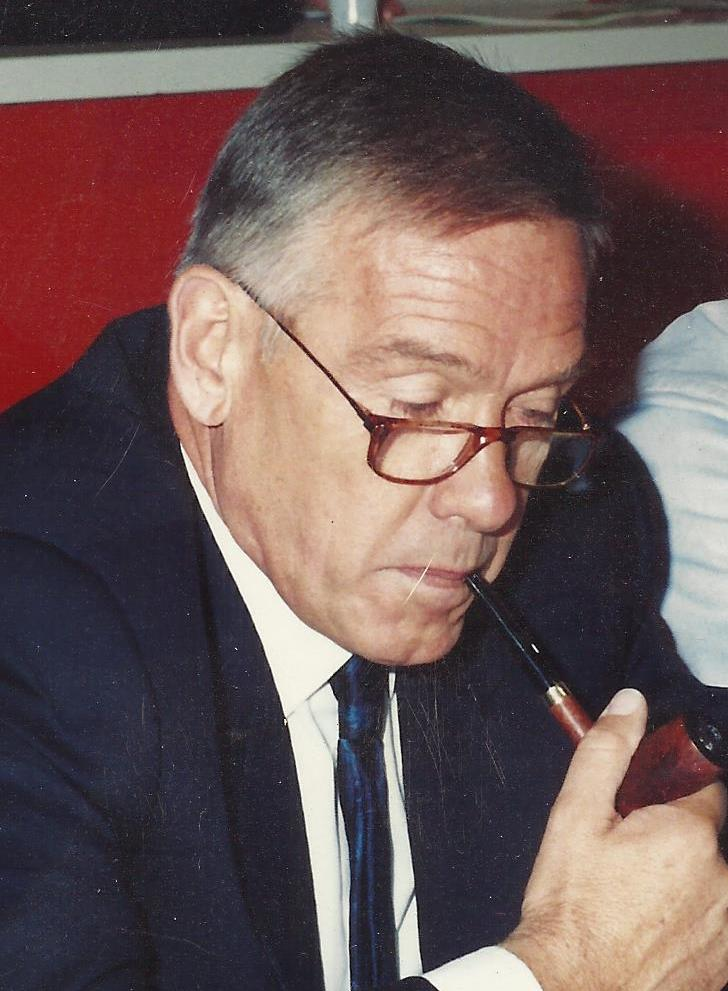

General Secretary of CGIL
- In office 29 November 1988 – 29 June 1994
- Preceded by: Antonio Pizzinato
- Succeeded by: Sergio Cofferati

Member of the European Parliament
- In office 13 June 1999 – 13 June 2004
- Constituency: North-West Italy

Member of the Chamber of Deputies
- In office 16 May 1963 – 4 June 1968
- Constituency: Lecce

Personal details
- Born: 9 December 1926 Pavie, France
- Died: 23 August 2007 (aged 80) Rome, Italy
- Party: PCI (before 1991); PDS (1991–1998); DS (1998–2007)
- Education: University of Padua
- Profession: Trade unionist, politician

Bruno Trentin (9 December 1926 – 23 August 2007) was an Italian trade unionist and politician, General Secretary of Italian General Confederation of Labour from 1988 to 1994.

== Biography ==
Trentin was born in Pavie, France, where his parents lived after escaping from the Fascist regime. After the Armistice of Cassibile, the Trentin family came back to Italy and joined the Italian resistance movement: at the age of 17, Trentin became the leader of the "Justice and Freedom" Brigade.

In 1949, Trentin graduated in law at the University of Padua, adhering to the Proudhonian thoughts, and joined both the Italian General Confederation of Labour and the Italian Communist Party, with which he was elected to the city council of Rome and to the Chamber of Deputies.

In 1988, Trentin became Secretary-general of the CGIL: in 1992, together with the leaders of the Italian Confederation of Workers' Trade Unions and the Italian Labour Union, Trentin signed a deal that put an end to the sliding wage scale system.

From 1999 to 2004, Trentin was a member of the European Parliament, elected with the Democrats of the Left.

Trentin died in Rome on 23 August 2007, at the age of 80, of pneumonia. He is now buried in the Verano Cemetery.

Trade union offices
Preceded by Luciano Lama	General Secretary of the Italian Federation of Metalworkers; 1961–1977	Succeeded by Pio Galli
