= Agostino Novella =

Italian worker and politician

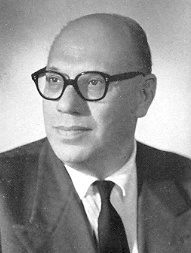

General Secretary of CGIL
- In office 3 December 1957 – 24 March 1970
- Preceded by: Giuseppe Di Vittorio
- Succeeded by: Luciano Lama

Member of the Chamber of Deputies
- In office 25 June 1946 – 24 May 1972
- Constituency: Genoa

Personal details
- Born: 14 December 1905 Genoa, Italy
- Died: 14 September 1974 (aged 68) Rome, Italy
- Party: PSI (1920–1924); PCdI (1924–1943); PCI (1943–1974)
- Profession: Trade unionist, politician

Agostino Novella (28 September 1905 – 14 September 1974) was an Italian trade unionist and communist politician.

== Biography ==
Born in Genoa, Novella worked in a shoe factory, then was apprenticed as a blacksmith in his father's workshop. He joined the Socialist Youth Federation in 1920, becoming active in the anti-fascist movement, and by 1923 was serving on the federation's national committee. However, in 1924, he led the whole of the Genoa federation into the Communist Party of Italy (PCdI).

In 1925, Novella undertook national service with the military, but he continued his political activities, and as a result spent time in military prison. He was discharged the following year, and became a leading supporter of Gramsci, serving on the central committee of the Italian Communist Youth Federation (FGCI). In November, he was sentenced to four years in prison in absentia, but he evaded capture until the middle of 1927. He was then imprisoned, being released in 1931 and exiled to France, where he became secretary of the FGCI. He undertook numerous missions for the group, also serving on the executive of the Communist Youth International, and studying at the Tolmačev School in Leningrad, and Sverdlov Communist University.

Novella was arrested in 1942, but the Vichy regime was unaware of his true identity, and so he was soon released. In 1943, he managed to clandestinely re-enter Italy, and began organising an opposition group, from a base in Milan. From 1945, he served on the central committee of the Italian Communist Party (PCI), and in 1946, he was elected to the assembly of the Province of Genoa.

Novella worked as the PCd'I's regional secretary for Liguria, then Lombardy, then from 1948 was the principal organiser of the Italian General Confederation of Labour (CGIL). From 1955, he was the leader of the Federation of Metallurgical Workers, then in 1958, he was elected as general secretary of CGIL. CGIL grew under his leadership, and he was also appointed as president of the World Federation of Trade Unions (WFTU). However, he became critical of some tactics of the WFTU, and was replaced as its president in 1961. In 1970, CGIL voted to separate its leadership from that of the PCI; Novella chose to retain his position on the central committee of the party, and resigned as the federation's secretary. He stood down in 1972, his health worsening, and was made the party's president of international relations.

Party political offices
Preceded by Celeste Negarville	Secretary of the Italian Communist Youth Federation; 1938–1940s	Succeeded by Enrico Berlinguer
Trade union offices
Preceded by Giovanni Roveda	General Secretary of the Italian Federation of Metalworkers; 1955–1957	Succeeded by Luciano Lama
Preceded by Giuseppe Di Vittorio	General Secretary of the Italian General Confederation of Labour; 1957–1970	Succeeded by Luciano Lama
Preceded by Giuseppe Di Vittorio	President of the World Federation of Trade Unions; 1959–1961	Succeeded by Renato Bitossi
