= Italian Federation of Hauliers and Inland Waterways =

Trade union of Italy

The Italian Federation of Hauliers and Inland Waterway Workers (Italian: Federazione Italiana Autotrasportatori e Internavigatori, FIAI) was a trade union representing transport workers in Italy.

The union was founded in 1948, as the Italian Federation of Auto, Rail and Inland Waterway Workers (FNAI), and it affiliated to the Italian General Confederation of Labour. By 1954, it had 84,812 members.

In 1968, the union renamed itself as the "Italian Federation of Hauliers and Inland Waterway Workers". Its membership was stable, and by 1979, stood at 86,595. In 1980 it merged with the Italian Railway Union, the Italian Federation of Civil Aviation Staff, the Union of Porters and Assistants, the Italian Federation of Marine Workers, and the Italian Federation of Port Workers, to form the Italian Federation of Transport Workers.

== General Secretaries ==
1948: Guido Antonizzi
1973: Altiero Ferrari
