= Susanna Camusso =

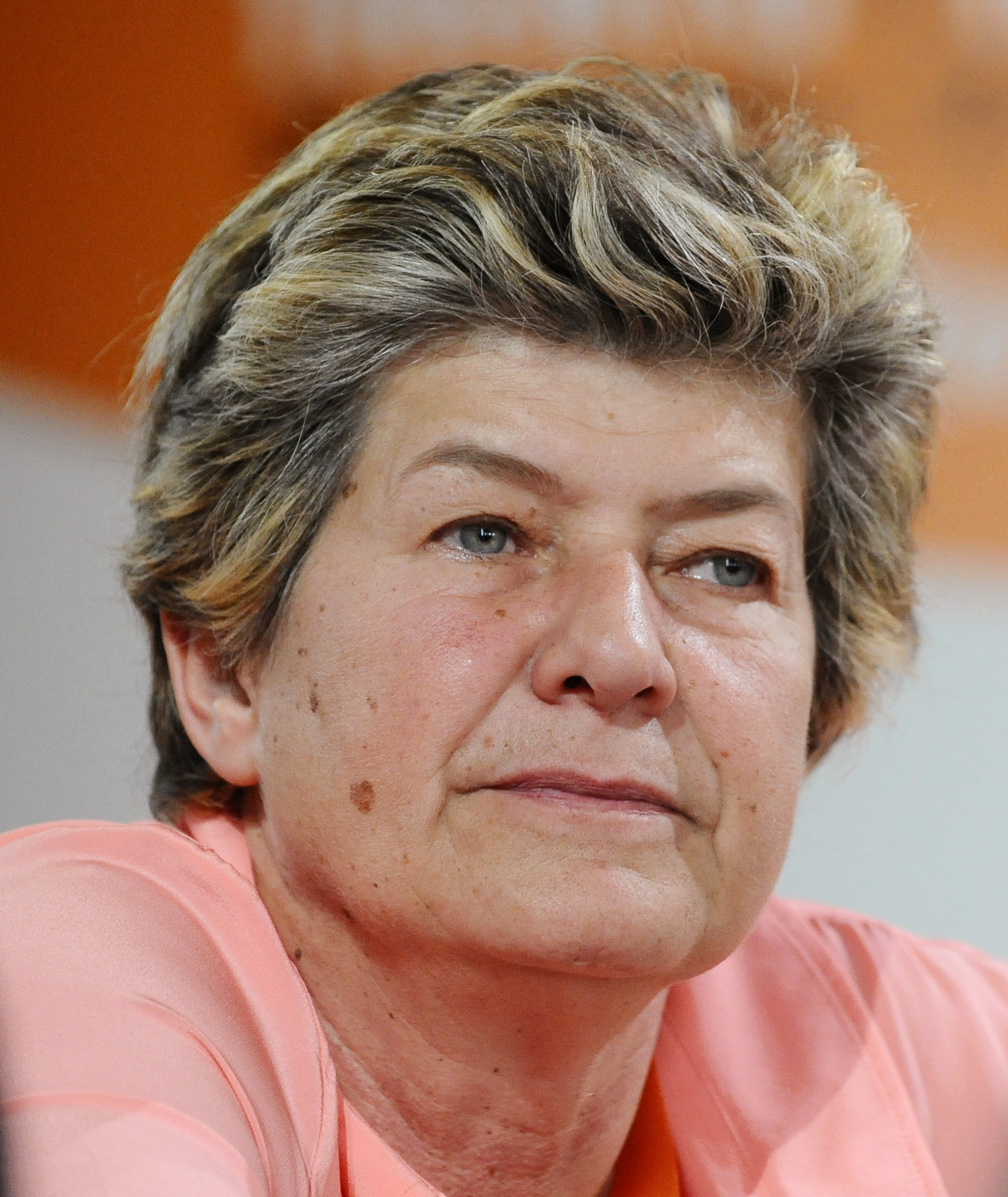

General Secretary of CGIL
- In office 3 November 2010 – 24 January 2019
- Preceded by: Guglielmo Epifani
- Succeeded by: Maurizio Landini

Member of the Senate
- Incumbent
- Assumed office 13 October 2022
- Constituency: Campania

Personal details
- Born: 14 August 1955 (age 71) Milan, Italy
- Party: Centre-left independent
- Other political affiliations: PSI (before 1994)
- Profession: Trade unionist

Susanna Camusso (born 14 August 1955) is an Italian trade unionist and former General Secretary of the CGIL.

== Biography ==
Camusso became involved with trade unions in 1975, while studying for a degree in archeology (incomplete), and was an activist for the right to education, coordinating the courses of the 150 hours of FLM in Milan. In the same period, she began to be an activist in the Italian Socialist Party. From 1977 to 1997 she was director of the local FIOM Milan, with some interruptions due to working with other union categories. She then moved to the regional FIOM in Lombardy, and finally to the national secretariat of the same metalworkers' union CGIL, with expertise in the automotive sector and steel production. She went on to assume the regional secretariat of FLAI, the agro-industry sector union CGIL and in 2001 was elected general secretary of the CGIL in Lombardy.

In 2008, Camusso entered the national Confederal Secretary of the CGIL, with responsibility for very different industries: policies of the productive sectors, cooperation, trade and agriculture. On 8 June 2010 she was elected vice deputy General Secretary of the CGIL, with responsibility for the coordination of cross communication between the departments of the various unions.

On 3 November 2010 she was elected general secretary of the CGIL, with 79.1% of the vote, succeeding Guglielmo Epifani, with whom she shares origins from the PSI.

On 13 February 2011 she attended the event If not now, when? for the respect and the dignity of women, following the Ruby case during the government of Silvio Berlusconi.

On 28 September 2012 she participated in the demonstration in Rome with the secretary of UIL, Luigi Angeletti, against cuts to Public Administration contained in the decree so-called "spending review".

In addition to her work with trade unions, Susanna Camusso is active in the women's movement, and is one of the promoters of the association We leave the Silence. She married and separated twice. Camusso has a daughter, Alice, with her second husband, journalist Andrea Leone.
