= Italian Federation of Paper and Printing Workers =

Trade union of Italy

The Italian Federation of Printing and Paper Workers (Italian: Federazione Italiana Lavoratori Poligrafici e Cartai, FILPC) was a trade union representing workers in the printing and papermaking industries in Italy.

The union was founded in 1946 as an affiliate of the Italian General Confederation of Labour, bringing together workers who had previously been represented by various craft unions. By 1980, the union had 79,430 members.

In 1981, the union merged with the Italian Federation of Entertainment Workers, to form the Italian Federation of Information and Entertainment Workers.

== General Secretaries ==
1946: Giovanni Valdarchi
1967: Giorgio Pavanetto
1970: Giorgio Colzi
