= Maurizio Landini =

Italian trade unionist (born 1961)

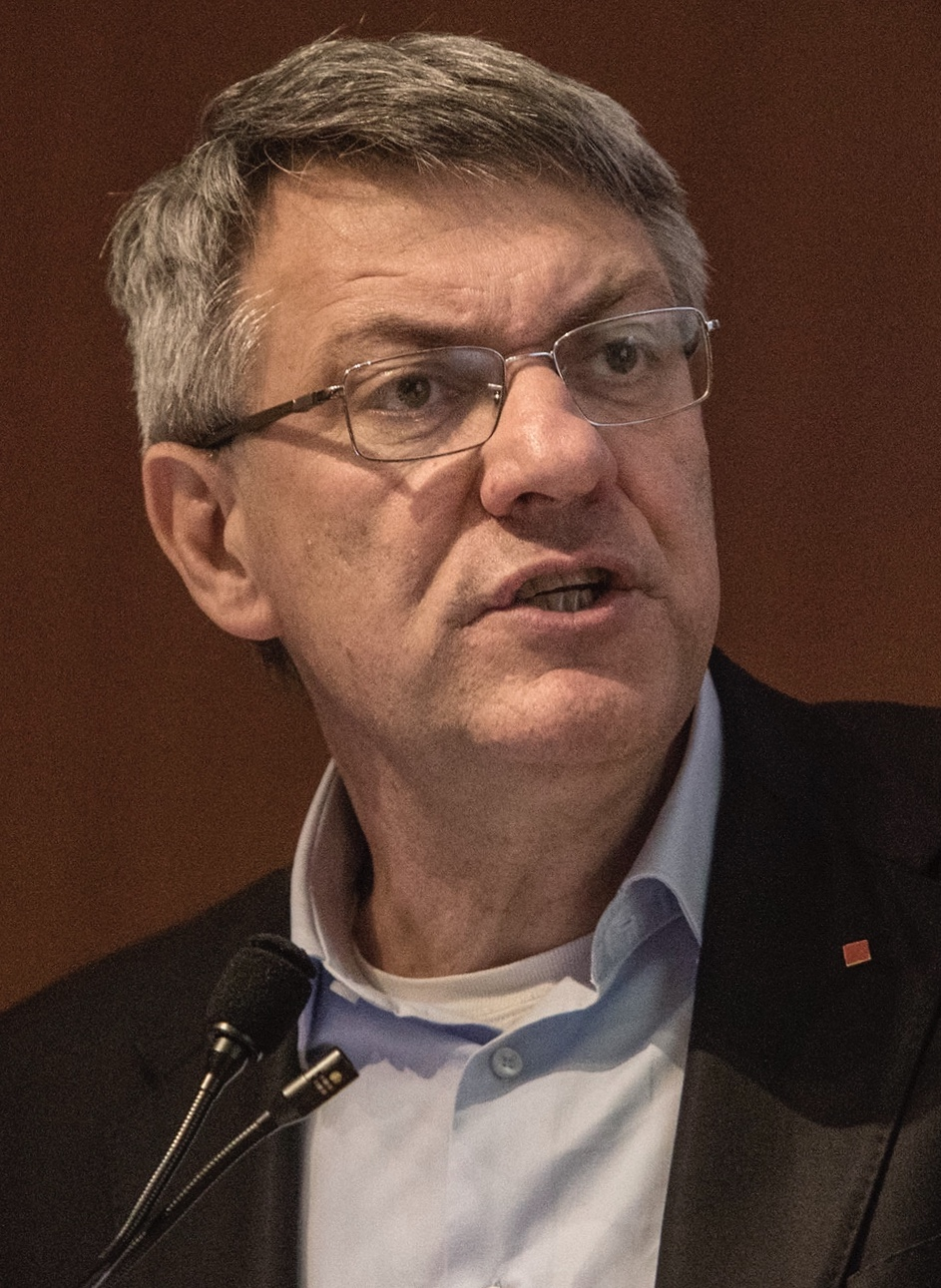

General Secretary of CGIL
- Incumbent
- Assumed office 24 January 2019
- Preceded by: Susanna Camusso

General Secretary of FIOM
- In office 1 June 2010 – 15 July 2017
- Preceded by: Gianni Rinaldini
- Succeeded by: Francesca Re David

Personal details
- Born: 7 August 1961 (age 65) Castelnovo ne' Monti, Italy
- Party: PCI (before 1991); Independent (since 1991)
- Profession: Trade unionist Metalworker

Maurizio Landini (born 7 August 1961) is an Italian trade unionist. Since January 2019, he is the General Secretary of CGIL. He was also former general secretary of FIOM from 2010 to 2017. Landini is considered a socialist and is famous for his populist political style.

== Biography ==
Landini was born in Castelnovo ne' Monti, near Reggio Emilia, in 1961. He was the second-last of five children; his father, who fought along with the Italian partisans during the World War II, was a cantoniere, a road maintenance worker who needed to live near the workplace due to service requirements, while his mother was a housewife. Landini grew up in San Polo d'Enza and, after middle school, he attended the building's surveyor secondary school, but he was forced to leave it due to financial difficulties of his family, and started working when he was only 15 years old as an apprentice welder in a cooperative in the engineering sector in Reggio Emilia.

During the 1980s he became an official of the Italian Federation of Metalworkers (FIOM) of Reggio Emilia. FIOM is the metalworkers' union of the Italian General Confederation of Labour (CGIL), the largest trade union in Italy. After a few years he was first elected provincial secretary of FIOM for Reggio Emilia, and subsequently, regional secretary of FIOM for Emilia-Romagna and provincial secretary again for Bologna.

On 30 March 2005, Landini was elected to the National Secretariat of FIOM. During these years, he led negotiations with companies such as Electrolux, Indesit and Piaggio. He closely followed with the then General Secretary, Gianni Rinaldini, negotiations for the renewal of the metalworkers' contract in 2009 under the centre-right government of Silvio Berlusconi. Landini was the head of the FIOM's delegation in negotiations for the renewal of the contracts with small and medium-sized enterprises.

=== General Secretary of FIOM ===
On 1 June 2010, Landini was elected General Secretary of FIOM. During his secretariat, Landini had a turbulent relationship with FIAT's CEO, Sergio Marchionne, whom he often criticized for his offshoring policies. In 2011 he wrote the book "Change the factory to change the world: FIAT, the trade union and the left's absence", published by Simon and Schuster. It is a book-interview about the whole history FIAT and especially, his relationship with Marchionne. As the leader of the metalworkers he was particularly involved in the Ilva affair.

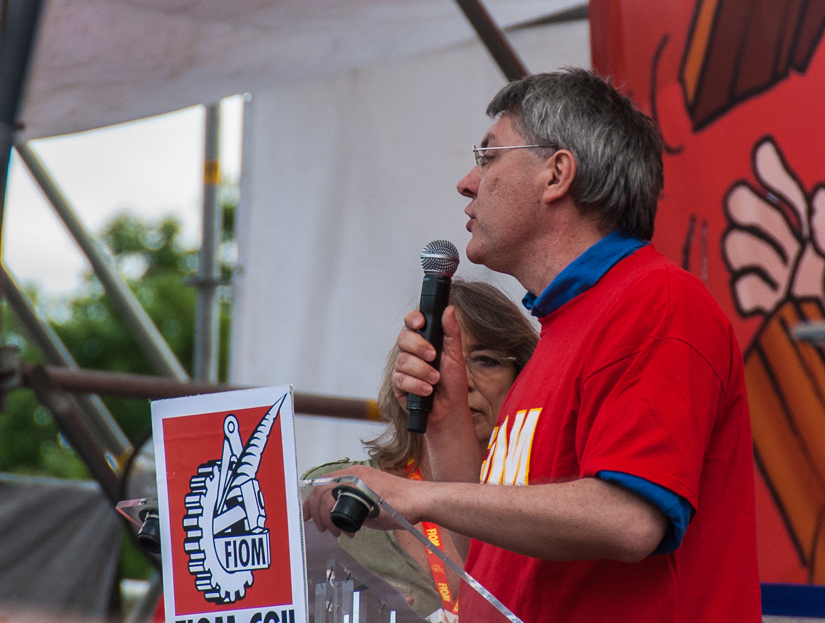
Maurizio Landini addressing the crowd during a FIOM strike in 2013

In 2014 Landini became a hard critic and opponent of centre-left Prime Minister, Matteo Renzi. Tensions rose up due to Renzi's huge labour market reform, called Jobs Act, which provided, among others, the abolition of Article 18 of Workers' Statute, which protected workers from unjustified dismissals. The proposal was heavily criticised by Landini and CGIL's General Secretary Susanna Camusso, who announced a public protest. On 25 October, almost one million people took part in a mass protest in Rome, organised by the CGIL in opposition to the labour reforms of the government. Some high-profile members of the left-wing faction of the Democratic Party also participated in the protest. On 8 November more than 100,000 public employees protested in Rome in a demonstration organised by the three trade unions. Despite the mass protests, in December, the Parliament approved the Jobs Act.

In June 2015, Landini launched Social Coalition (CS), a transversal political organization, whose goals were the protection of workers and the middle class. The organization – which reunited several leftist thinkers, such as the jurist Stefano Rodotà, the Communist politician and medic Vittorio Agnoletto, and the former Potere Operaio leaders Oreste Scalzone and Franco Piperno – never became an official party and was disbanded after few months.

In 2016, he was particularly involved in the 2016 constitutional referendum proposed by Renzi, where voters were asked whether they approve a constitutional law that amended the Italian Constitution to reform the composition and powers of the Parliament of Italy, as well as the division of powers between the State, the regions, and administrative entities. Landini campaigned for the "No", stating that it was a "badly made reform". On 4 December, the reform was reject by voters with 59% of votes against and 41% in favor, and Renzi resigned from his post.

On 15 July 2017, Landini left the leadership of FIOM and was succeeded by Francesca Re David. Four days before, the CGIL's General Assembly approved his appointment in the National Secretariat, with 166 votes in favour, 7 against and 1 abstained.

=== General Secretary of CGIL ===
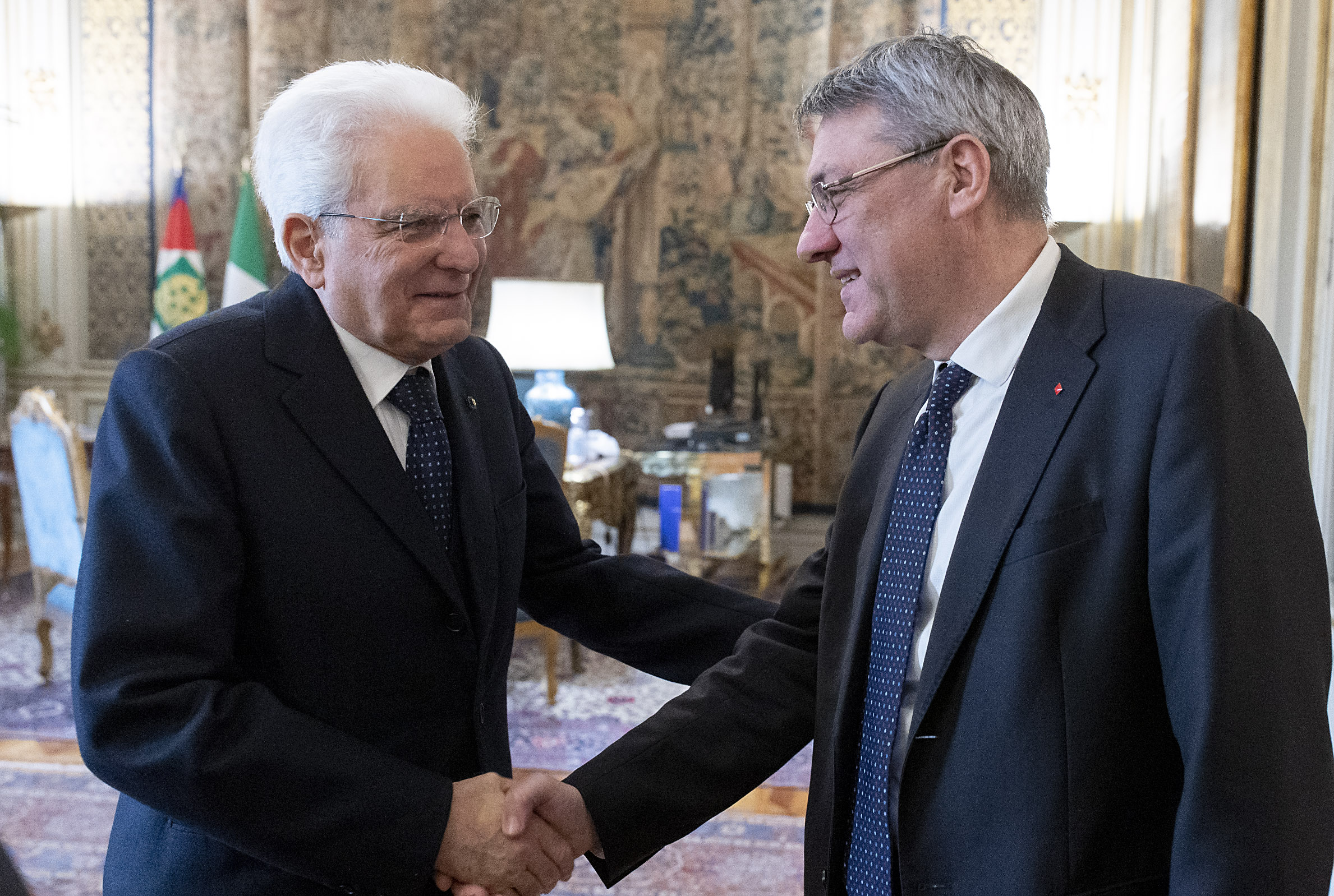
Landini with President Sergio Mattarella at the Quirinal Palace, in 2019

On 24 January 2019, during the 18th National Congress in Bari, Landini was elected General Secretary of CGIL, with more than 93% of votes in favor. His main opponent in the Congress, Vincenzo Colla, a reformist and former Regional Secretary of CGIL for Emilia-Romagna, was appointed Vice Secretary. During his inaugural speech, Landini strongly attacked the M5S–League government and especially its Interior Minister and de facto leader, Matteo Salvini, denouncing a serious risk of a return of fascism in the country.

On 9 February, CGIL, CISL and UIL protested together in Rome, against the economic measures promoted by Conte's government; more than 200,000 people participated in the march. It was the first time since 2013 that the three trade unions organized a unified rally.

In December 2019, Landini proposed to the new government between M5S and PD the sign of a "social pact" against deindustrialization, with the aim of planning "a project to rule the transition to a new model of sustainable development, but also to control the technological transformation in the production system, keeping work, quality of work and workers' rights at the centre of the project". Prime Minister Giuseppe Conte and PD's leader Nicola Zingaretti strongly supported Landini's proposal.

On 9 October 2021, the CGIL's national headquarter in Rome was attacked my a mob of members the neo-fascist party New Force, who were protesting against the introduction of a COVID-19 vaccination certificate in Italy. Secretary Landini described the attack as an "act of fascist squadrismo".

On 18 March 2023, at the 19th Congress of the CGIL, Landini was re-elected general secretary with 94.2% of votes in favour.
