= Giuseppe Di Vittorio =

Italian trade unionist and politician (1892–1957)

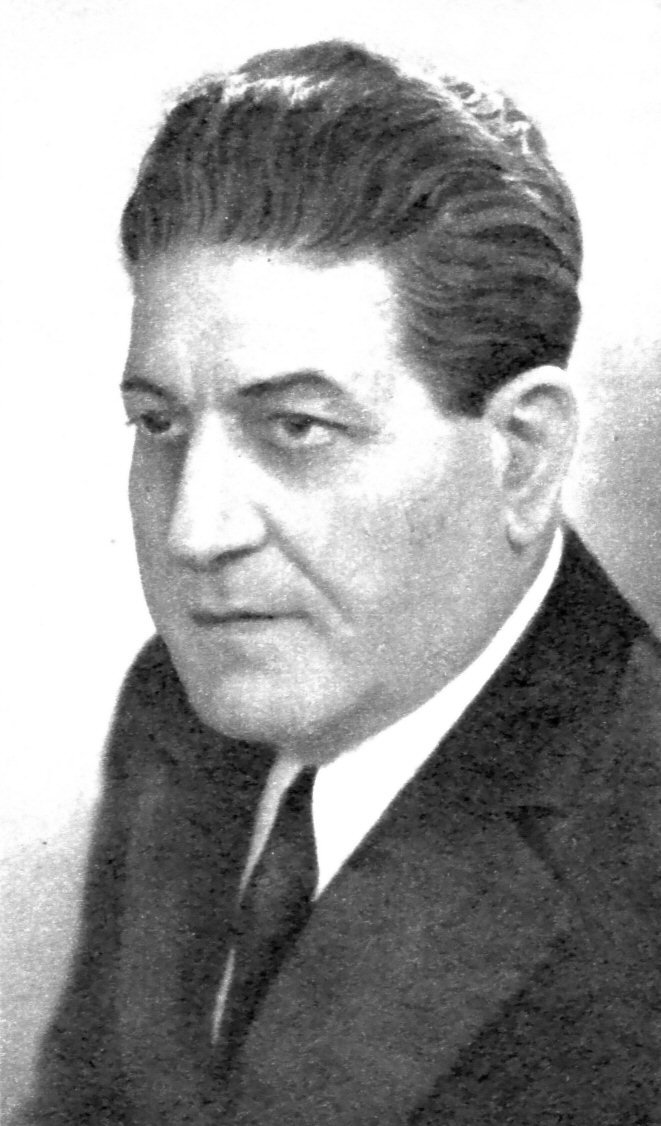
- Vittorio in 1950

General Secretary of CGIL
- In office 3 June 1944 – 3 November 1957
- Preceded by: Office established
- Succeeded by: Agostino Novella

Member of the Chamber of Deputies
- In office 8 May 1948 – 3 November 1957
- Constituency: Bari
- In office 11 June 1921 – 25 January 1924
- Constituency: Bari

Member of the Constitutional Assembly
- In office 25 June 1946 – 31 January 1948
- Constituency: Bari

Personal details
- Born: 11 August 1892 Cerignola, Apulia, Kingdom of Italy
- Died: 3 November 1957 (aged 65) Lecco, Lombardy, Italy
- Party: PSI (1920–1924); PCdI (1924–1943); PCI (1943–1957)
- Spouses: Carolina Morra (m. 1919; died 1935); Anita Contini (m. 1953)
- Children: 2, including Baldina
- Profession: Trade unionist; politician

Giuseppe Di Vittorio (11 August 1892 – 3 November 1957), also known as Mario Nicoletti, was an Italian trade union leader and communist politician.

He was one of the most influential trade union leaders of the labour movement after World War I. He became president of the World Federation of Trade Unions.

== Early life ==
Giuseppe Di Vittorio was born in Cerignola, Apulia, into a family of poor agricultural day labourers. After his father's death, Di Vittorio was forced to leave school and work as a day labourer. He joined the May 1904 general strike during which five workers were killed by troops in Cerignola. Di Vittorio was strongly influenced by the growth of peasants' organizations and the spread of socialist ideas, giving rise to his participation in the local young socialist organization in Cerignola. He was radicalised by affiliating with the national Federazione Giovanile Socialista (Federation of Young Socialists), led by syndicalists in opposition to the official youth federation of the Italian Socialist Party (PSI). His involvement in the socialist and labour movement grew, and in 1911 he became chairman of the Camera del Lavoro in Minervino Murge.

As a native of the Mezzogiorno, Di Vittorio became involved in the union plans for solving the region's acute problems in the manner illustrated by the Fasci Siciliani (Sicilian Workers Leagues) in the final decade of the 19th century. A partisan of insurgence, Di Vittorio became a leader of an anarcho-syndicalist Unione Sindacale Italiana (USI) after its formation in 1912. After the Red Week, a number of arrest warrants were issued against him, leading to his escape to Lugano, Switzerland, in June 1914; he would return ten months later, when the government issued a general amnesty.

While the majority of the USI opposed militarism, Randolfo Pacciardi claimed that Di Vittorio belonged to a minority of left-wingers, like Alceste De Ambris and Filippo Corridoni, who supported irredentist claims and advocated Italy's entry into World War I. Di Vittorio later denied this, but there is a pro-war article under his name appearing on Il Popolo d'Italia in June 1915. He served in the conflict in a Bersaglieri unit, and was discharged in 1916 after having been gravely wounded.

== Opposition to fascism ==
In the 1921 Italian general election, Di Vittorio was elected to Parliament in the lists of the PSI. For the 1924 Italian general election, he joined the Communist Party of Italy (PCdI) but failed to be re-elected. Di Vittorio was also a member of the militant anti-fascist organisation Arditi del Popolo.

The new situation after the rise to power of fascism and the March on Rome made him an enemy of Benito Mussolini's regime. In May 1927, he was sentenced in absentia to twelve years of imprisonment for subversive propaganda by the Special Tribunal for the Defense of the State. He managed to flee to France, and later lived in the Soviet Union from 1928 to 1930, where he represented the dissolved General Confederation of Labour in the Profintern, as well as being Italy's representative in the Krestintern. Afterwards, he returned to Paris, where he was a member of the Politburo of the Italian Communist Party.

Di Vittorio joined the Republican side fighting Francisco Franco's forces during the Spanish Civil War. He was Political Commissar of the XI International Brigade. After the fall of the Republic, he headed the board of a Paris-based antifascist newspaper, La Voce degli Italiani.

In 1941, Di Vittorio was arrested by German authorities in France on a request from Fascist Italy, and held in internal exile on Ventotene.

== Post-war years ==
Di Vittorio (standing) addresses a meeting of the International Fur & Leather Workers Union in New York City, October 1946

In 1944, Di Vittorio, along with socialist and Catholic union leaders, agreed to re-establish CGIL as a representative of all currents of trade unionism in Italy, including communists, socialists, Christian democrats, and anarcho-syndicalists. He was elected union secretary the following year.

As a union representative, Di Vittorio sat on the National Council, an advisory body created to fulfil the role of a provisional legislature from September 1945 to June 1946. In the 1946 Italian general election, he was elected to the Constituent Assembly as a member of the Italian Communist Party (PCI), and would later be re-elected as a member of the new Parliament in the 1948 and 1957 Italian general elections.

With the onset of the Cold War and the breakdown of the alliance between the main anti-fascist parties, particularly Christian Democracy (DC) and the Italian Communist Party, the organisation suffered internal divisions. When a right-wing student attempted to assassinate the PCI leader Palmiro Togliatti in July 1948, CGIL called a general strike and organised street protests during which widespread rioting occurred. After this event, those affiliated with the Christian Democrats within the union left to establish the Confederazione Italiana Sindacati Lavoratori (CISL). They were followed in May 1949 by supporters of the Italian Democratic Socialist Party, which split from the PSI and left to form what would become the Unione Italiana del Lavoro (UIL). These three organisations continue to be Italy's main labour unions.

During the Hungarian Revolution of 1956, Di Vittorio clashed with Togliatti over the CGIL's statements of support for the Hungarian insurgents. According to Antonio Giolitti, this position was supported by Di Vittorio himself during private meetings, and archival documents show that the CGIL secretary faced pressure from the PCI leadership to retract the statements.

Di Vittorio continued leading CGIL as Italy's largest union with the backing of the PCI and PSI until his death from a heart attack in 1957. He was also a longtime leader of the World Federation of Trade Unions. His strong charisma made him the most popular myth of the Italian workers. His funeral was attended by more than three million people coming to Rome from all over Italy.

== Electoral history ==
Election	House	Constituency	Party	Votes	Result
1921	Chamber of Deputies	Bari	PSI	—N/a	Elected
1924	Chamber of Deputies	Apulia	PCdI	—N/a	Not elected
1946	Constituent Assembly	Bari–Foggia	PCI	74,809	Elected
1948	Chamber of Deputies	Bari–Foggia	FDP	90,979	Elected
1953	Chamber of Deputies	Bari–Foggia	PCI	118,274	Elected

Trade union offices
Preceded by New position	General Secretary of the Italian General Confederation of Labour; 1944–1957	Succeeded by Agostino Novella
Preceded by Arthur Deakin	President of the World Federation of Trade Unions; 1948–1957	Succeeded by Agostino Novella
