= Bruno Buozzi =

Italian trade unionist and anti-fascist

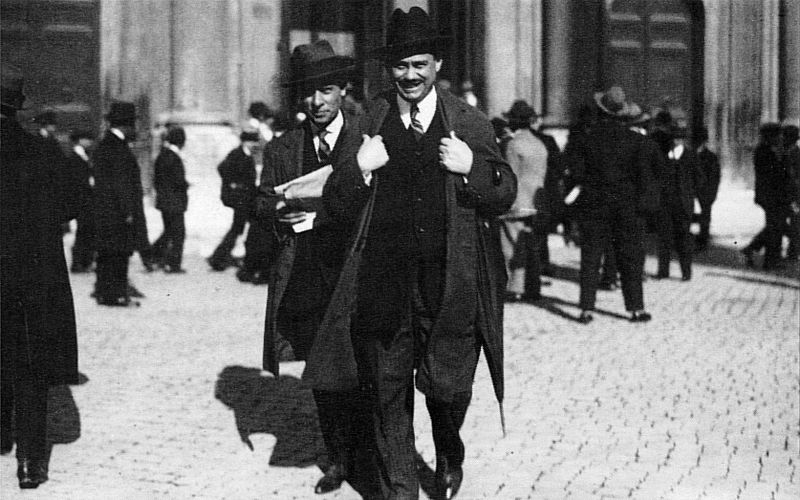
Bruno Buozzi in Rome, 1924

Bruno Buozzi (31 January 1881 – 4 June 1944) was an Italian socialist politician, trade unionist and anti-fascist resistance leader.

== Biography ==
=== Early life ===
Buozzi was born in to a working-class family. Forced to leave his studies after primary school, he moved to Milan in the early 1900s, where he began working as a mechanic, joining the Italian Socialist Party (PSI) and the Italian Federation of Metalworkers (FIOM) in 1905. Buozzi headed FIOM as secretary from 1911 to 1925, and from 1911 onwards he was a member of the leadership of the General Confederation of Labour (CGT), remaining a supporter of the reformist current in the PSI.

=== Interwar period ===
At the 17th Congress of the PSI in Livorno, he followed Giacomo Matteotti and Filippo Turati into the United Socialist Party. He was elected to the Chamber of Deputies of the Kingdom of Italy in 1919, 1921, and 1924. During the political crisis caused by Matteotti's assassination by the Fascists, he supported the Aventine Secession of the Socialists and, together with Turati, represented the USP on the "Committee of Sixteen".

In March 1925, he led the last mass metalworkers' strikes after the establishment of the fascist regime. In December 1925, remaining the only influential trade unionist unwilling to bow to fascism, he became the general secretary of the CGT. He received numerous death threats, was attacked by Squadristi, and in 1926 went into exile in Paris with his family. As a result of an emergency law introduced by Mussolini as part of the enforcement of the totalitarian state, he was removed from his position as a member of parliament on November 9, 1926, along with 123 other Aventine Party members. In exile, he became involved with the International Federation of Trade Unions. He maintained his friendship with Turati, who died in his Paris apartment in March 1932. During the Spanish Civil War, he organized, on behalf of the PSI, aid supplies for the Spanish Republicans fighting against Francoist forces.

=== World War II and death ===
After the German occupation of Paris in the spring of 1940, Buozzi moved to Tours and returned to the French capital a few months later, where he was arrested by the Gestapo on March 1, 1941. He was taken to La Santé prison, from where he and his fellow trade unionist Giuseppe Di Vittorio were extradited via Germany to Italy. The Fascist regime exiled him to Montefalco, where he spent two years. A few days after Mussolini's fall, he was liberated on July 30, 1943. Together with Sandro Pertini, who had also been freed from exile, he secured the release of all the prisoners on the island of Ventotene. The Badoglio government appointed him commissioner of the newly formed Industrial Workers' Trade Unions. A few days before the announcement of the Armistice of Cassibile on September 8, 1943, Buozzi and Giuseppe Mazzini, commissioner of the employers' association Confindustria, signed the Buozzi-Mazzini Agreement on September 2. The agreement allowed, for the first time after 18 years of fascist dictatorship, independent, employee-elected representatives in factories.

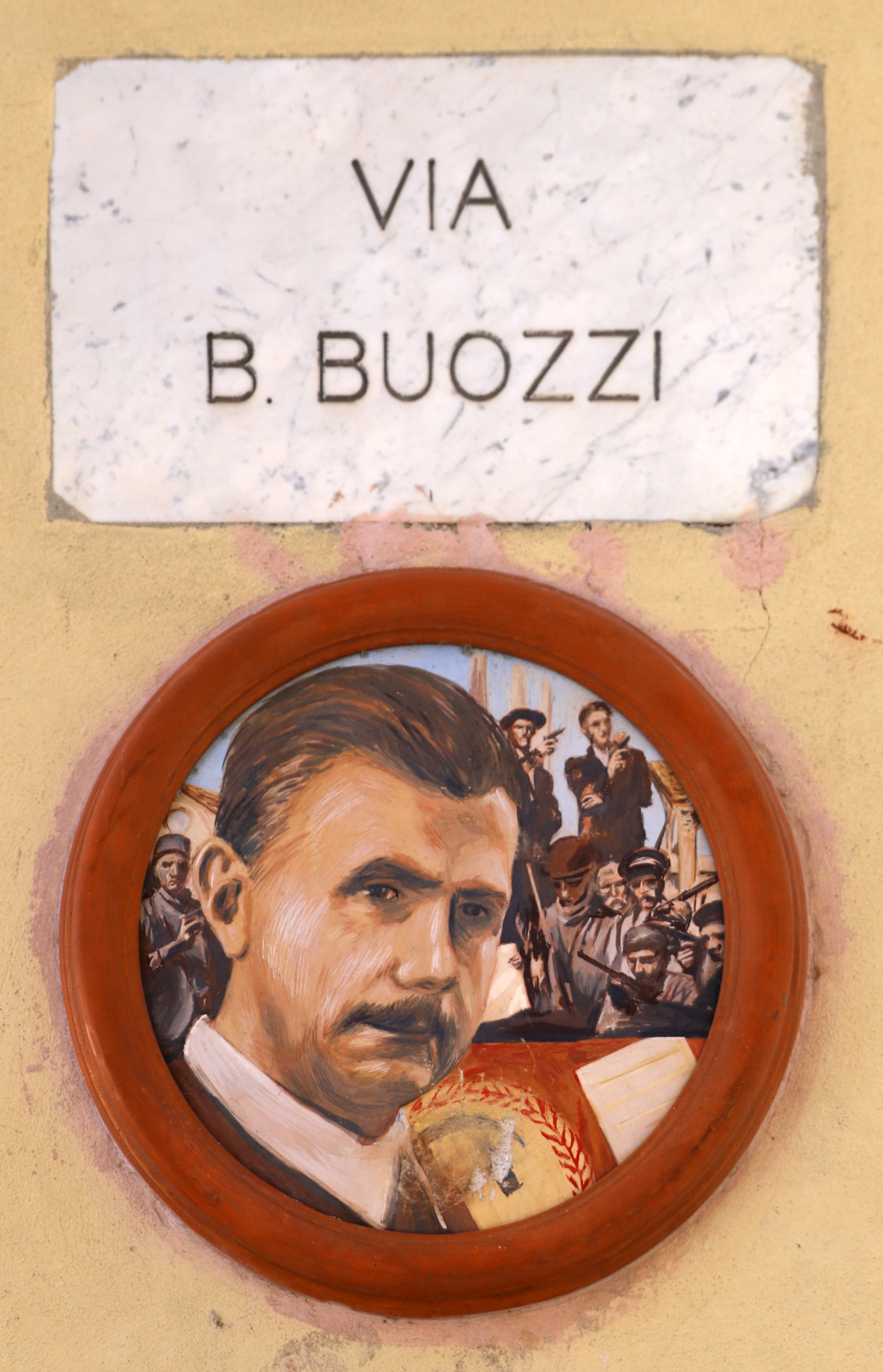
Painted medallion depicting Bruno Buozzi at the Bruno Buozzi avenue in Campiglia Marittima

After the announcement of the armistice between the Kingdom of Italy and the Western Allies on September 8, 1943 and the subsequent occupation of Northern Italy by German troops, he went underground, but on April 13, 1944, he was arrested and on the night of June 4, 1944, during the retreat of German troops from Rome, he was shot along with 13 other resistance fighters, presumably on the orders of SS-Hauptsturmführer and deputy Gestapo chief in Rome, Erich Priebke. He was buried in the Verano Cemetery.

After the Liberation, in 1949 the Municipality of Rome erected a monument in Via Giulio Galli, in the locality of La Storta, with the names and professions of the 13 murdered people whose identities were known. Multiple streets and squares in Rome and many other Italian cities were later named after Buozzi.
