= Achille Grandi =

Italian politician (1883–1946)

Achille Grandi (24 August 1883 – 28 September 1946) was an Italian politician and catholic syndicalist.

Grandi was born in Como, Italy. In 1918, he entered the secretariat of the Confederazione Italiana dei Lavoratori CIL being one of its founding members, with Ulisse Carbone. He was elected CIL general secretary from 1922 to 1926 and brought the CIL up to 2 million members. In 1919 he was among the founding members of Partito Popolare Italiano becoming member of the parliament the same year. During fascism he didn't collaborate and survived working in a printing house. On 3 June 1944 he was one of the promoters and signatories of the Pact of Rome, which originated the unified CGIL and was the germ of all post-war Italian trade-unionism. In August 1944 he founded the Associazioni Cristiane dei Lavoratori Italiani (ACLI) becoming just for 6 months their president. As member of Democrazia Cristiana he was elected in 1946 to the Constituent Assembly of Italy. He died two months later in Desio nearby Milan, aged 63.

== See also ==
- Pact of Rome
- Associazioni Cristiane dei Lavoratori Italiani (ACLI)
- Constituent Assembly of Italy
