= Sliding wage scale =

The sliding wage scale consists in increasing the wages as the prices rise in order to maintain the purchasing power of the workers even if there is inflation.

== Application ==
=== In Belgium ===
Main article on the Dutch Wikipedia

=== In France ===
The sliding wage scale was introduced in France in July 1952 under Vincent Auriol's presidency (SFIO) and Antoine Pinay's government (CNIP).

It was removed in 1982 as Jacques Delors (PS) was Finance minister, in the second administration of Pierre Mauroy (PS).

=== In Italy ===
In Italy it was introduced in 1945, modified several times since and definitely removed in 1992.

=== In the European Union ===
Since 2013 salaries of employees of the institutions of the European Union are linked to the rate of inflation of Belgium and Luxembourg.

== See also ==
- Indexation
- Living wage
- Real wages
- Wage–price spiral
