= General Confederation of Labour (Italy) =

Trade union of Italy

- General Confederation of Labour
- Confederazione Generale del Lavoro
- The 1906 Congress of the CGdL, at the Camera del Lavoro, Milan.
- Merged into: Italian General Confederation of Labour
- Founded: 1 October 1906
- Dissolved: 4 June 1944
- Location: Italy
- Members: 2,200,100 (1920)

General Confederation of Labour (Italian: Confederazione Generale del Lavoro, CGdL) was an Italian labor union, founded in 1906, under the initiative of socialist militants. Having survived the Fascist dictatorship and the Second World War as an underground organization, the CGL joined the cross-party CGIL labor federation in 1945.

== History ==
=== Founding ===
The Confederazione Generale del Lavoro was founded 1 October 1906 but its formation goes back to the first Camera del Lavoro (Workers' Hall) begun in Milan in 1891, and to the founding of its largest constituent unions (especially the FIOM national metal workers' union created in 1901). The CGdL's first secretary was the Reformist Socialist Rinaldo Rigola (1906–1918). It affiliated to the International Secretariat of National Trade Union Centres.

=== Growth and decline ===
In the first few years, membership of the federation grew rapidly, reaching 383,770 in 1911. It then fell, but boomed at the end of World War I, and by 1920 had reached a peak, of 2,200,100. Over time, the trades councils became less important, and the national industrial unions became the dominant force; the CGdL itself always lacked authority, with affiliates freely joining and leaving. During the war, it was the only major European trade union federation to oppose its government's participation in the conflict.

After the war, the federation was reluctant to follow the more radical line of the Italian Socialist Party, and this led Rigola to resign in 1918. He was replaced by fellow reformist Ludovico D'Aragona. The unions undertook a major campaign for a maximum eight-hour working day, but this was soon overtaken by the rise of fascism. The CGdL formed an Alliance of Labour with the syndicalist USI and UIL, which called a general strike in 1922, but achieved little.

Membership of the federation began falling, and by 1924 was down to only 200,000. Its leaders proclaimed that it was apolitical, in the hope of avoiding a ban, but after the right to strike was abolished, in 1926, it could do little. Bruno Buozzi became the general secretary in January 1926, but was forced to flee the country later in the year. On 4 January 1927, the federation decided to dissolve itself.

=== Underground and Liberation ===
The decision to disband was opposed by communists, and by left socialists like Buozzi. The communists held a secret trade union congress in Milan in February 1927, also attended by some left-wing socialists. Little activity was possible, and the members largely began working in the official fascist trade unions, in the hope of inspiring resistance.

Buozzi, based in France, also maintained a CGdL in exile, which had little influence in Italy. In 1936, he and the communists announced that they had agreed to co-operate, which had little immediate impact, but paved the way for a resurgence of trade union activity in the later part of World War II.

=== Postwar ===
After its forced suspension, unions were reconstituted under the Pact of Rome (3 June 1944), confederating the socialist, communist and Christian Democrat unions in the CGIL (Italian General Confederation of Labor). The influence of the PCI and Palmiro Togliatti, was strong in the federation, and in 1948 the PSI and Christian Democrat unions left to form the UIL and CISL.

== Affiliates ==
The following unions were in existence by 1902, and were later involved with the CGdL:

Union	Membership (1902)
Agricultural Workers	240,000
Bakers	3,000
Barbers	2,000
Chemical Workers	6,000
Clerks	4,500
Construction Workers	29,000
Cooks and Waiters	8,000
Gas Workers	3,500
Glass Workers	2,880
Gold Workers	659
Hatters	5,220
Leather Workers	3,694
Lithographers	1,000
Metal Workers	50,000
Nurses	Not recorded
Port Workers	7,000
Post and Telegraph Workers	4,700
Railway Workers	41,000
Seamen	12,000
Shoemakers	3,461
State Monopoly Workers	10,000
Telegraph Messengers	1,000
Textile Workers	18,000
Tramway Workers	6,400
Woodworkers	6,000
Typographical Workers	9,600
Zincographers	155

== General Secretaries ==
1906: Rinaldo Rigola
1918: Ludovico D'Aragona
1926: Bruno Buozzi
1926: Battista Magilone

== See also ==
- Italian General Confederation of Labour, the CGL's direct descendant.

== Bibliography ==
- Antonio Alosco, Alle origini del sindacalismo, La ricostruzione della CGL nell’Italia liberata (1943–1944), Prefazione di Giorgio Benvenuto, SugarCo Edizioni, Milano, 1979.
- Arturo Peregalli, L’altra Resistenza. Il PCI e le opposizioni di sinistra in Italia 1943-1945, Graphos, Genova, 1991.
