= Wallon =

Wallon is a surname. Notable people with the surname include:

- Henri-Alexandre Wallon (1812–1904), French historian and statesman
- Henri Wallon (psychologist) (1879–1962), French psychologist and grandson of Henri-Alexandre Wallon

== See also ==
- Walloon (disambiguation)
