= Toxotai =

Ancient Greek archers

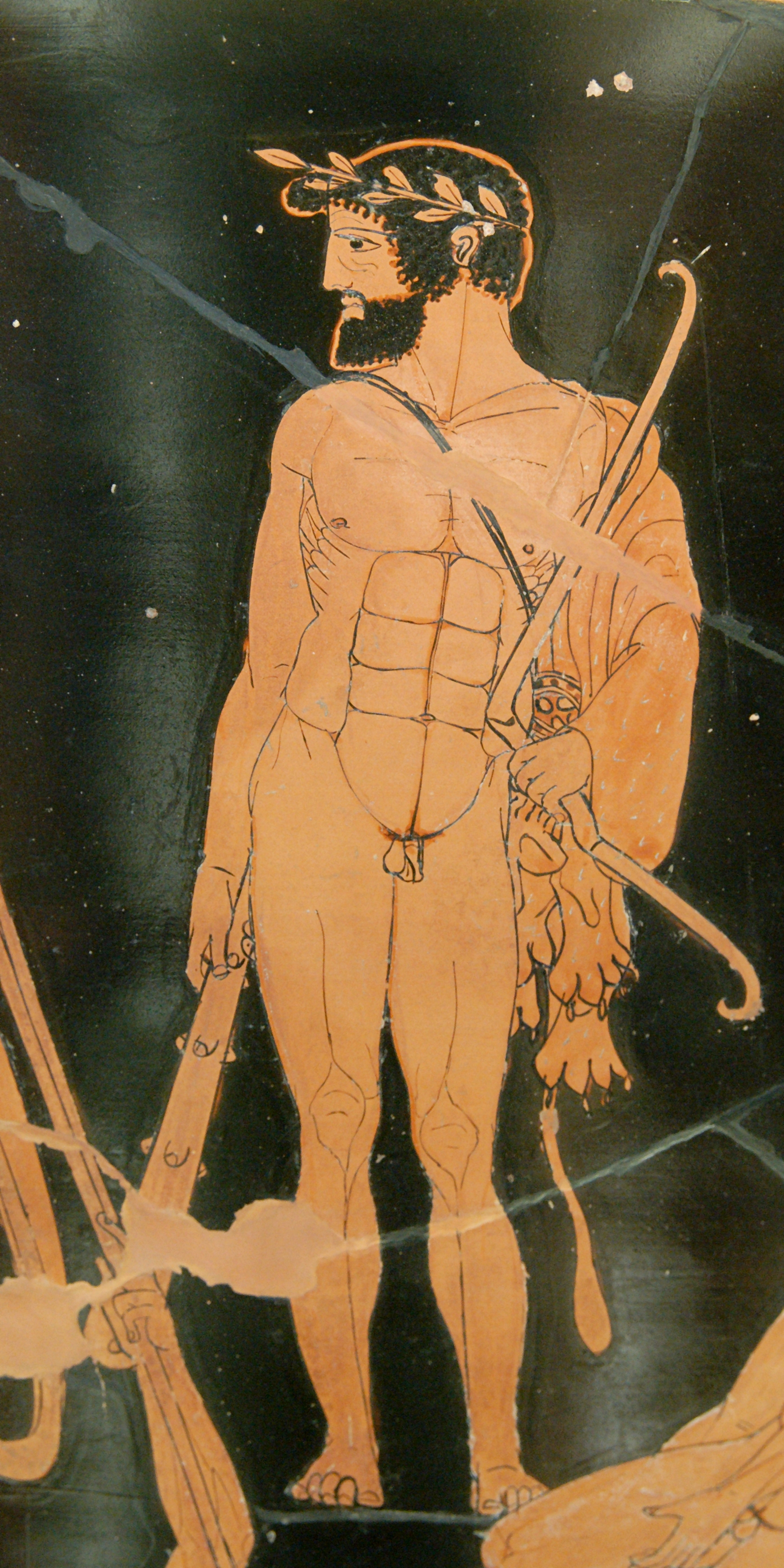
Heracles wielding a bow and club.

Toxotai (Ancient Greek: τοξόται, romanized: toxotai, lit. 'archers'; singular: τοξότης, toxótēs) were Ancient Greek and Byzantine archers. During the ancient period they were armed with a short Greek bow and a short sword. They carried a little pelte (or pelta) (πέλτη) shield.

Hippotoxotai (ἱπποτοξόται) were mounted archers and rode ahead of the cavalry.

The term toxotes was used to describe the mythic Sagittarius, a legendary creature thought to be a centaur.

Unlike cavalry or hoplites, toxotai tended to come from the lower classes of citizens, at least in Athens. They were viewed with prejudice by both the elite and the non-elite in Greek society, many of their contemporaries thought of them as cowards. Classical Athenians usually defined courage in terms of hoplites remaining steadfast in the face of danger, accepting the possibility of injury or death; archers never put themselves in such physical danger, and thus were not courageous.

Toxotai also referred to the class of public slaves, or Demosioi, also known as Scythian archers, who were depicted as carrying bows and were tasked with preserving order in certain public spaces, similar to a police force.
