= Henri Wallon =

Henri Wallon may refer to:

- Henri-Alexandre Wallon (1812–1904), French historian and statesman, grandfather of the following
- Henri Wallon (psychologist) (1879–1962), French psychologist and politician, grandson of the preceding
