= World Federation of Teachers' Unions =

FISE WFTU FSM
- World Federation of Teachers Unions, Federación Internacional Sindicl de la Ensenanza, Fédération Internationale Syndicale de l'Enseignement, الاتحاد الدولي النقابي للتعليم
- Federation Internationale Syndicale de L'Enseignement FISE WFTU FSM
- Founded: 1946
- Key people: Drissi Abderrazzak, General Secretary, 2025; Amiya Kumar Mohanty, President, 2025
- Affiliations: WFTU FSM
- Website: fise.taalim.org wftufise.org www.facebook.com/fise.wftu.fsm.2025/

The World Federation of Teachers Unions (French: Federation Internationale Syndicale de L'Enseignement FISE) is the Trade Union International (TUI) branch of the World Federation of Trade Unions representing educators.

== History ==
The FISE was founded in Paris in July 1946 as a merger of the International Trade Secretariat of Teachers and l'Internationale des Travailleurs de l’Enseignement (ITE), with the participation of the American Education Association. In 1951 a group of unions split off and founded the International Federation of Free Teachers Unions.

During the 1980s it cooperated with the International Federation of Teachers Unions (then affiliated with the International Confederation of Free Trade Unions), the World Federation of Educators (affiliated with the World Confederation of Labour) and the World Federation of Organizations of the Teaching Profession.

FISE is an organization with consultative status with United Nations Educational, Scientific and Cultural Organization (UNESCO) and United Nations Economic and Social Council (ECOSOC). It has had its position within UNESCO since at least 1985.

== Action ==
FISE takes actively part in the Worker’s Group of the International Labour Organisation (ILO), as well as in conferences of all of the above international organisations. During the previous period it actively participated in most activities of the WFTU and took initiatives which strengthened the renown and the strength of the organisation. In 2013 it organized an international conference in Brussels on “the role of teachers today, today’s school, public education, democracy in education” and published a book with the proceedings. It held meetings with trade unionists teachers from different countries and unions: Cuba, Germany, Egypt, Palestine, Greece, Italy, Mexico, etc. FISE publishes every year announcements and posters useful for every trade union, concerning the International Workers’ May Day (May 1), the International Teachers Day, the International Women's Day (March 8), the Day of the Anti-fascist Victory of Peoples (May 9), the day against violence towards women, against child labour, for the refugees, the xenophobia and racism, and other relevant topics or subjects of commemoration. It particularly focuses on the expression of concrete solidarity. It denounced the killings and police attacks against the Mexican teachers. One of the most important actions that FISE undertook in Greece was the solidarity campaign for the children of Palestine, entitled "a notebook for GAZA". Many students, parents, parents' associations, cultural associations, women's associations, responded to the invitation of FISE and gathered materials. They organized theatrical performances in which the ticket was two notebooks or other school supplies. Discussions have been held by teachers to students on the situation in Palestine. Painting exhibitions on the Palestinian matter were organised, as well as other initiatives, too. In 2017 FISE also launched a support campaign for Yemeni children and protests against the war in Yemen.

== Organization ==
The organization's highest body is the Statutory Conference, formerly called the World Conference of Teachers. Originally annual events, they were held at irregular intervals in the 1950s and now are constitutionally mandated to be held every four years. Between meetings of this conference the organization is headed by an Administrative Committee which meets at least once a year. Day to operations are directed by a Bureau which consists of the General Secretary, President, Vice-President and Secretariat, who are ex-officio members of the Administrative Committee.

FISE was originally headquartered in Paris but was expelled in 1952 for "fifth column activities". It then moved to the Soviet sector of Vienna, but was expelled, again, in February 1956. The location of the headquarters immediately after the expulsion from Vienna is unclear, though FISEs' journal Teachers of the World was published from 10 Rue de Solférino, Paris 7ème. In 1978 its headquarters is reported at Wilhelm Wolff Strasse 21, East Berlin 111. It was at the same address in 1985. Its current headquarters is at 6/6 Kalicharan Ghosh Road, 700 050, Kolkata, India. After the 18th Congress, FISE was located in Mexico, then after the 19th, it moved to Hyderabad, India.

=== Conferences ===
The first six conferences were called "World Conferences of Teachers". They were denoted "Statutory Conferences" since at least 1985:

- Paris, July 1946
- Brussels, 1947
- Budapest, 1948
- Warsaw, 1949
- Vienna, 1950
- Vienna, 1953
- Warsaw, August 1957
- 13th Statutory Conference Sofia, May 24-6, 1985
- 16th Statutory Conference New Delhi, March 9 to 11, 2007
- 17th Statutory Congress Caracas, Venezuela, September 19–20, 2012
- 18th Statutory Congress Mexico City, Mexico, March 4–5, 2018
- 19th Congress: Bhubaneswa City, India, December 2019
- 20th Congress: Rabat City, Morocco, April 2025

== Membership ==
In August 1956 FISE was reported to have seven million members in 34 countries. By the 1978 this had grown to over 16 million in 74 organizations in 50 countries. In 1985 the group claimed 20 million members in 121 organizations in 82 countries. As of 2009 FISE claimed over 26 million members within 156 trade unions in 40 countries including France, Greece, Burkina Faso, Cape Verde, Congo, Ethiopia, Libyan Arab Jamahiriya, Morocco, Mozambique, Senegal, Togo, Argentina, Bolivia (Plurinational State of), Brazil, Chile, Colombia, Cuba, Ecuador, Jamaica, Mexico, Nicaragua, Peru, Bangladesh, China, India, Iraq, Kazakhstan, Democratic People's Republic of Korea, Kuwait, Lao People's Democratic Republic, Lebanon, Nepal, Pakistan, Palestinian territories, Philippines, Sri Lanka, Syrian Arab Republic, United Arab Emirates, Vietnam, and Yemen.

=== Regional federations ===
By 1978 the FISE had two regional federations, the Confederation of American Teachers and the Federal of Arab Teachers Syndicates. As of 2009 there are four regional affiliates - Confederation of American Educators, Federation of Teachers Organizations of Central America, Federation of Arab Teachers and the Federation of University Workers Unions of Central America, the Caribbean and Mexico Since 2012 one Vice-president of FISE is elected for each continent. On the basis of the Vice-President, there is one Regional Office per continent.

=== National sections ===
In 1978 the following organizations were affiliated with FISE:

- Albania - Section "Enseignement" de l'Unione Professionnelle d'Albanie
- Angola - Syndicat National des Enseignants Angolais
- Austria - Union of Democratic Teachers
- Bangladesh - Bangladesh College Teachers Association
- Bangladesh - Bangladesh Teachers Association
- Benin - Syndicat National des Enseignants des Ecoles Privees Laique du Benin
- Benin - Syndicat National des Enseignants des Ecoles Ex-Catholiques du Benin
- Bolivia - Union Progressista de Educadores de Bolivia
- Bolivia - Federación Nacional de Maestros de Bolivia
- Bulgaria - Union des Enseignants Bulgares
- Central African Empire - Syndicat National des Enseignants Centrafricans
- Chile - Sociedad Nacional de Profesores de Chile
- China - Syndicat des Travailleurs des Ensiegnanats de Chine
- Congo - Federation des Travailleurs des Ensiegnanats, de la Science, de l'Information et de la Culture
- Costa Rica -
- Cuba - Sinicato Nacional de Education y de las Ciencias
- Cyprus - Organization of Technical School Teachers of Cyprus
- Cyprus - Organization of Secondary School Teachers of Cyprus
- Cyprus - Pan Cyprian Greek Teachers Organization - enseignant primaire
- Czechoslovakia - Federation des Travailleurs des Ensiegnanats et de la Science de la Tchecoslovaquiae
- Dominican Republic - Asociación Dominicana de Profesores
- Egypt - Teachers' Syndicate of the Arab Republic of Egypt
- El Salvador - Federation des Syndicats de Travailleurs des Universities d'Amerique Centrale
- Ethiopia - Teachers Association of Ethiopia
- France - Fédération de l'éducation nationale de la CGT
- France - Syndicat National des Esiegnements Techniques et Professionnels (SNETP-CGT)
- France - Syndicat National de la Recherche Scientifique de France (SNRS-CGT)
- France - Syndicat National des Esiegnement Superieur
- France - Syndicat des Personnels Educatif et Administratif de la FFMJC (FEN-CGT)
- France - Syndicat National des Esiegnement Secondairs de France (associate)
- East Germany - Union of Education and Training
- Guatemala -
- Guyana - Guyana Teachers' Association
- Honduras - Federation des Syndicats de Travailleurs des Universities d'Amerique Centrale
- Hungary - Syndicat des Ensiegnanats Hongrois
- India - All Bengal Primary Teachers Association
- India - All Bengal Teachers Association
- India - All India College Principals Association
- India - All India Federation of Ele/Pri School Teachers Associations
- India - All India Federation of University and College Teachers' Organizations
- India - All India School Teachers Federation
- India - All Orissa Federation of Teachers Organizations
- India - Andhra Pradesh Teachers' Union
- India - Bengal Primary Teachers Association
- India - Orissa Secondary School Teachers Association
- India - Secondary Teachers' and Employees' Union
- India - West Bengal College and University Teachers Association
- India - West Bengal Headmasters Association
- Iraq - Iraqi Teachers Union
- Italy - National School Union (CGIL) (associate)
- North Korea - Union of Teachers and Cultural Workers of Korea
- North Korea, Japan - Union of Korean Teachers and School Clerks in Japan
- Lebanon - Syndicat des Ensiegnanats des Ecoles Privees
- Madagascar - Syndicat des Ensiegnanats des Madagascar
- Mexico - Sindicato Nacional de Trabajadores de la Educación de Mexico
- Mexico - Federacion de Asociaciones y Sindicados de Trabajadores al Servicio de Universidades e Institudos de Ensanzas Superior de Rep. Mexico
- Mongolia - Syndicat des Travailleurs de la Culture de la Education de Mongolie
- Nicaragua -
- Palestine - General Union of Palestinian Teachers
- Panama - Frente Reformista de Educadores Panamenos
- Peru - Federacion Nacional de Trabajadores de la Education de Peru
- Poland - Syndicat des Ensiegnanats Polonais
- Romania - Union des Syndicats des l'Ensiegnanats de la Science et de la Culture de Roumanie
- Senegal - S.E.S Syndicat des Ensiegnanats du Senegal
- Somalia - Union des Travailleurs des l'Ensiegnanats
- Soviet Union - Syndicat des Travailleurs de l'Ensiegnanats et de la Science de l'URSS
- Sri Lanka - All Ceylon Union of Tamil Teachers
- Sri Lanka - National Union of Teachers (Sri Lanka Jatika Guru Sangamaya)
- Sri Lanka - National Union of Teachers (Private)
- Sudan - Sudanese Federation of Teachers Trade Unions
- Syria - Syndicat des Ensiegnants de la Republique Arabbe Syrienne
- Turkey - Association de tous les Ensiegnants pour le Unite et la Solidarite
- Upper Volta - Syndicat des Ensiegnants Africains de Haute Volta
- Uruguay - Federacion Uraguaya de Docentes Universitarios del Uruguay
- Uruguay - Federacion Uraguaya de Docentes y Administrativos de la Universidad del Trabajo
- Venezuela - Asociación de Profesores de la Universidad de Carabobo
- Vietnam - Syndicat des Travailleurs de l'Ensiegment du Vietnam
- South Yemen - Educational Professions Union

== Publications ==
The FISE published a quarterly Teachers of the World in English, French and German with "separate" Latin American Spanish and Japanese editions. By the 1980s this publication carried a "pedagogical supplement" financed by UNESCO. Another bulletin was published 8 times a year and was variously called Educators International Courier or International Teachers News. It was published in English, French, Spanish, German, Russian, Portuguese and Arabic.

FISE still publishes Teachers of the World quarterly in English as well as the FISE Information Letter eight times a year in French, English, Spanish, Russian, German, Portuguese, Arabic.

FISE also submitted a nomination for the 2018 edition of the UNESCO Prize for Girls’ and Women’s Education (GWE) to UNESCO.

== Leadership ==
=== General Secretaries ===
1949: Paul Delanoue
1961: Angel Pizarro
1962: Hélene Dazy
1967: Marius Delsal
1973: Daniel Retureau
1994: Gérard Montant
1998: Mrinmoy Bhattacharyya
2007:
2013: Orlando Perez
2018: Mariano García
2025: Drissi Abderrazzak

=== Presidents ===
1949: Henri Wallon
1964: Paul Delanoue
1975: Lesturuge Ariyawansa
2007: Akhtar uzz Zazam
2013: Hassan Ismail
2019: Amiya Kumar Mohanty
2025: Amiya Kumar Mohanty

== See also ==
- Education International
