= Slavery in ancient Greece =

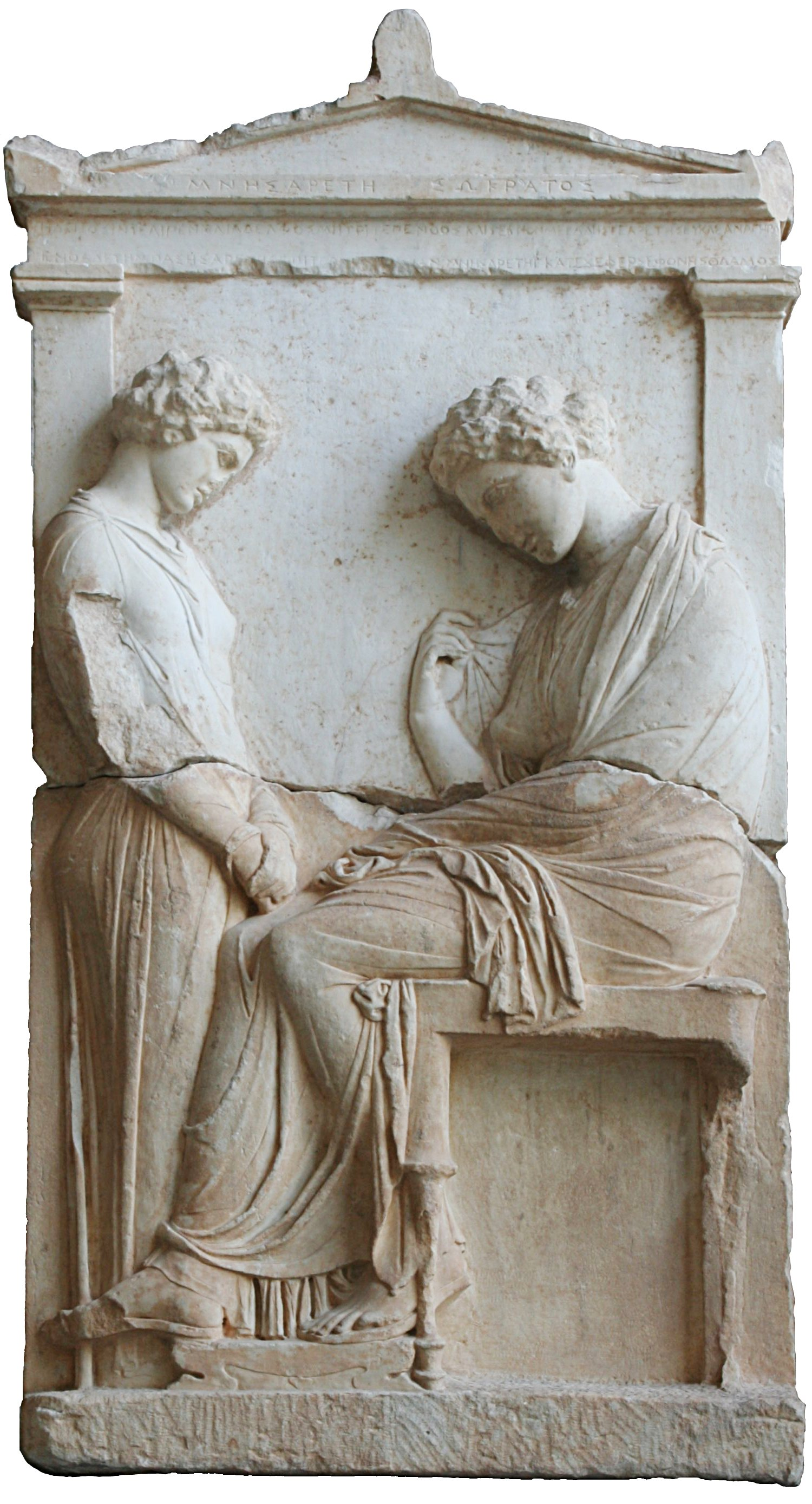
Funerary stele of Mnesarete, daughter of Socrates; a young servant (left) is facing her dead mistress. Attica, c. 380 BC. (Glyptothek, Munich).

Slavery was a widely accepted practice in ancient Greece. The principal use of slaves was in agriculture, but they were also used in stone quarries or mines, as domestic servants, or even as a public utility, as with the demosioi of Athens.

Modern historiographical practice distinguishes between chattel slavery (where the slave was regarded as a piece of property, as opposed to a member of human society) and land-bonded groups such as the penestae of Thessaly or the Spartan helots, who were more like medieval serfs (an enhancement to real estate). The chattel slave is an individual deprived of liberty and forced to submit to an owner, who may buy, sell, or lease them like any other chattel.

The academic study of slavery in ancient Greece is beset by significant methodological problems. Documentation is disjointed and very fragmented, focusing primarily on the city-state of Athens. No treatises are specifically devoted to the subject, and jurisprudence was interested in slavery only as much as it provided a source of revenue. Greek comedies and tragedies represented stereotypes, while iconography made no substantial differentiation between slaves and craftsmen.

== Terminology ==
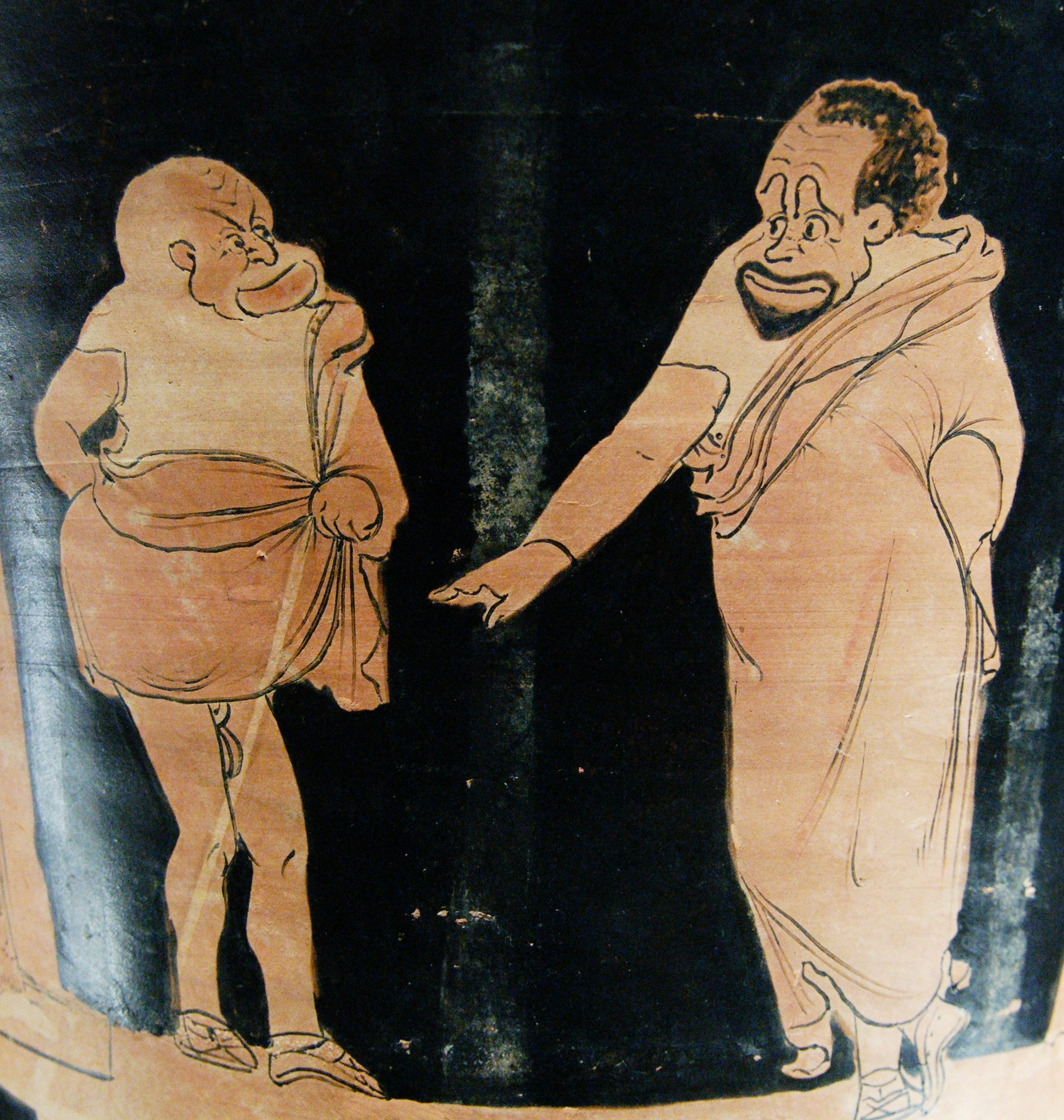
A master (right) and his slave (left) in a phlyax play, Silician red-figured calyx-krater, c. 350 BC – 340 BC. Louvre Museum, Paris.

The ancient Greeks had several words to indicate slaves, which leads to textual ambiguity when they are studied out of their proper context. In the works of Homer, Hesiod and Theognis of Megara, the slave was called δμώς (dmōs). The term has a general meaning but refers particularly to war prisoners taken as booty (in other words, property). During the classical period, the Greeks frequently used ἀνδράποδον (andrapodon), (literally, "one with the feet of a man") as opposed to τετράποδον (tetrapodon), "quadruped" or livestock. The most common word for slaves is δοῦλος (doulos), used in opposition to "free man" (ἐλεύθερος, eleútheros); an earlier form of the former appears in Mycenaean inscriptions as do-e-ro, "male slave" (or "servant", "bondman"; Linear B: 𐀈𐀁𐀫), or do-e-ra, "female slave" (or "maid-servant", "bondwoman"). The verb δουλεὐω (which survives in Modern Greek, meaning "work") can be used metaphorically for other forms of dominion, as of one city over another or parents over their children.

Other terms used to indicate slaves were less precise and required context:

- θεράπων (therapōn) – At the time of Homer, the word meant "companion" (Patroclus was referred to as the therapōn of Achilles and Meriones that of Idomeneus); but during the classical age, it meant "servant".
- ἀκόλουθος (akolouthos) – literally, "the follower" or "the one who accompanies". Also, the diminutive ἀκολουθίσκος, used for page boys.
- παῖς (pais) – literally "child", used in the same way as "houseboy", also used in a derogatory way to call adult slaves.
- σῶμα (sōma) – literally "body", used in the context of emancipation.

=== Terms denoting slave roles and functions ===
The term οἰκέτης (oiketēs) was used, as meaning "one who lives in house", referring to household servants.

Anagnostes (ἀναγνώστης; plural anagnostae, ἀναγνῶσται) was a term used for an educated slave whose task was to read books out aloud for their master.

The demosii (δημόσιοι) were public slaves in Athens, purchased by the state to perform various duties. They served in roles such as members of the police force, executioners, treasury workers, clerks, and record keepers in the assembly and courts. Additionally, they worked as minters, miners, and occasionally as rowers in the Athenian navy (like in the battle of Arginusae). The state was responsible for their training, preparing them for their specific roles.

A paratiltrios (παρατίλτριος) was a slave who attended bathers, removing unwanted body hair. The same practice applied to women, who were served by female slaves called παρατίλτριαι (the plural of παρατίλτρια, the feminine form of παρατίλτριος).

== Pre-classical Greece ==
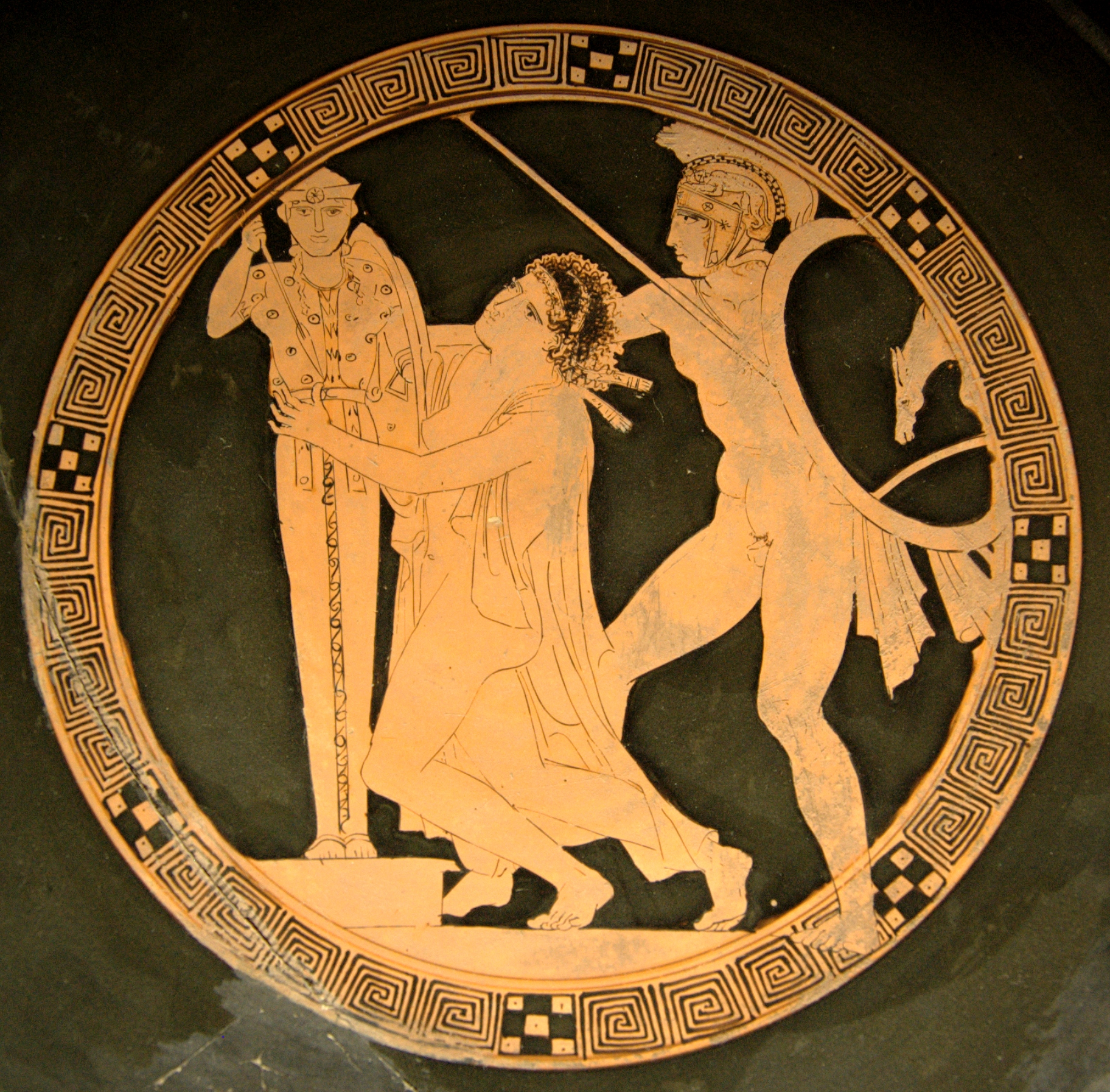
Women as plunder of war: Ajax the Lesser taking Cassandra, tondo of a red-figure kylix by the Kodros Painter, c. 440–430 BC, Louvre.

Slaves were present through the Mycenaean civilization, as documented in numerous tablets unearthed in Pylos 140. Two legal categories can be distinguished: "slaves (εοιο)" and "slaves of the god (θεοιο)", the god in this case probably being Poseidon. Slaves of the god are always mentioned by name and own their own land; their legal status is close to that of freemen. The nature and origin of their bond to the divinity is unclear. The names of common slaves show that some of them came from Kythera, Chios, Lemnos, or Halicarnassus and were probably enslaved as a result of piracy. The tablets indicate that unions between slaves and freemen were common and that slaves could work and own land. It appears that the major division in Mycenaean civilization was not between a free individual and a slave but rather if the individual was in the palace or not.

There is no continuity between the Mycenaean era and the time of Homer, where social structures reflected those of the Greek Dark Ages. The terminology differs: the slave is no longer do-e-ro (doulos) but dmōs. In the Iliad, slaves are mainly women taken as booty of war, while men were either ransomed or killed on the battlefield.

In the Odyssey, the slaves also seem to be mostly women. These slaves were servants and sometimes are concubines.

There were some male slaves, especially in the Odyssey, a prime example being the swineherd Eumaeus. The slave was distinctive in being a member of the core part of the oikos ("family unit", "household"): Laertes eats and drinks with his servants; in the winter, he sleeps in their company. Eumaeus, the "divine" swineherd, bears the same Homeric epithet as the Greek heroes. Slavery remained, however, a disgrace: Eumaeus declares, "Zeus, of the far-borne voice, takes away the half of a man's virtue, when the day of slavery comes upon him".

It is difficult to determine when slave trading began in the archaic period. In Works and Days (8th century BC), Hesiod owns numerous dmōes although their exact status is unclear. The presence of douloi is confirmed by lyric poets such as Archilochus or Theognis of Megara. According to epigraphic evidence, the homicide law of Draco (c. 620 BC) mentioned slaves. Draco, the first Athenian lawgiver, allowed a wide space for private violence against the slave. According to Plutarch, Solon (c. 594–593 BC) forbade slaves from practising gymnastics and pederasty. By the end of the period, references become more common. Slavery becomes prevalent at the very moment when Solon establishes the basis for Athenian democracy. Classical scholar Moses Finley likewise remarks that Chios, which, according to Theopompus, was the first city to organize a slave trade, also enjoyed an early democratic process (in the 6th century BC). He concludes that "one aspect of Greek history, in short, is the advance hand in hand, of freedom and slavery."

== Economic role ==
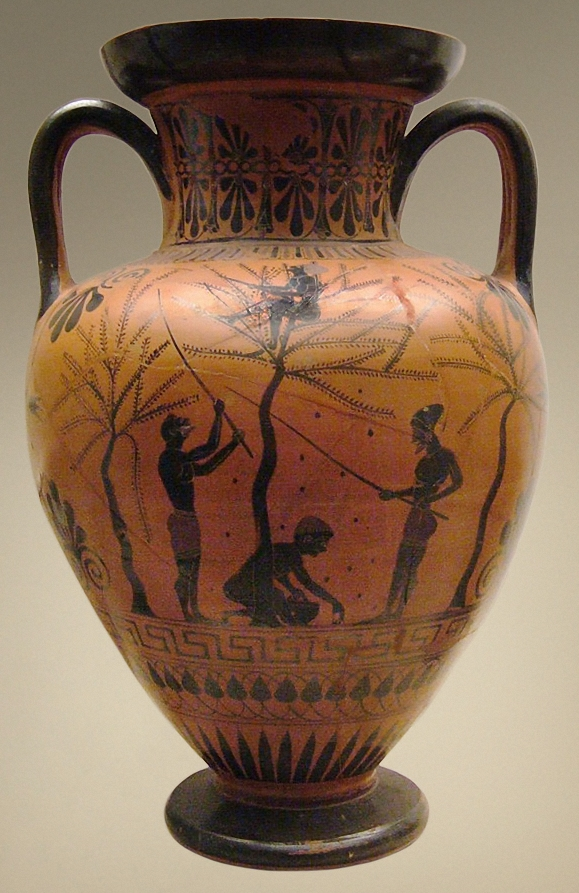
Agriculture, a common use for slaves, black-figure neck-amphora by the Antimenes Painter, British Museum

All activities were open to slaves with the exception of politics. For the Greeks, politics was the only occupation worthy of a citizen, the rest being relegated wherever possible to non-citizens. It was status that was of importance, not occupation.

The principal use of slavery was in agriculture, the foundation of the Greek economy. Some small landowners might own one slave, or even two. An abundant literature of manuals for landowners (such as the Economy of Xenophon or that of Pseudo-Aristotle) confirms the presence of dozens of slaves on the larger estates; they could be common labourers or foremen. The extent to which slaves were used as a labour force in farming is disputed. It is certain that rural slavery was very common in Athens, and that ancient Greece did not have the immense slave populations found on the Roman latifundia.

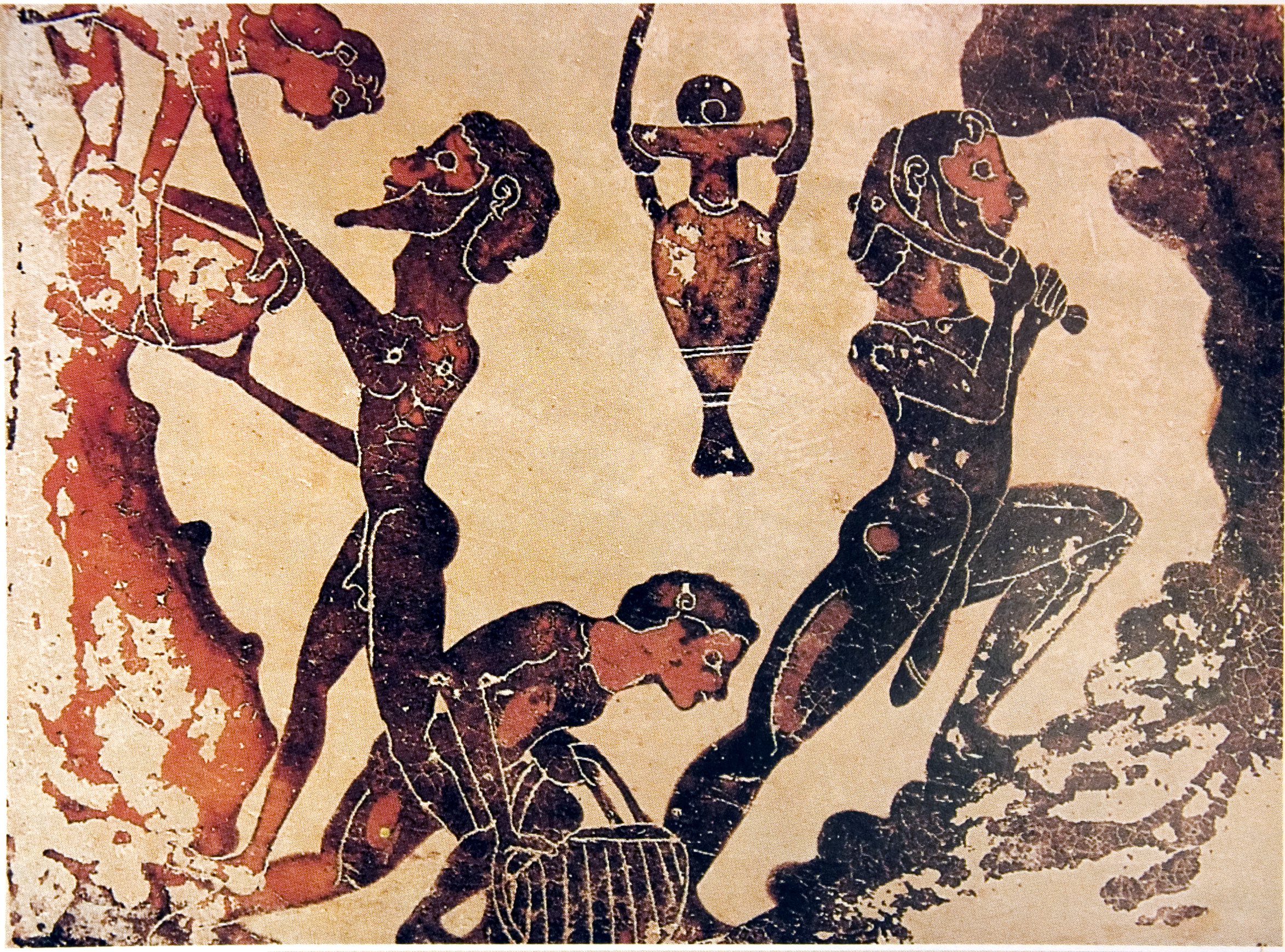
Corinthian black-figure terra-cotta votive tablet of slaves working in a mine, dated to the late seventh century BC

Slave labour was prevalent in mines and quarries, which had large slave populations, often leased out by rich private citizens. The strategos Nicias leased a thousand slaves to the silver mines of Laurion in Attica; Hipponicos, 600; and Philomidès, 300. Xenophon indicates that they received one obolus per slave per day, amounting to 60 drachmas per year. This was one of the most prized investments for Athenians. The number of slaves working in the Laurion mines or in the mills processing ore has been estimated at 30,000. Xenophon suggested that the city buy a large number of slaves, up to three state slaves per citizen, so that their leasing would assure the upkeep of all the citizens.

Slaves were also used as craftsmen and tradespersons. As in agriculture, they were used for labour that was beyond the capability of the family. The slave population was greatest in workshops: the shield factory of Lysias employed 120 slaves, and the father of Demosthenes owned 32 cutlers and 20 bedmakers.

Ownership of domestic slaves was common, the domestic male slave's main role being to stand in for his master at his trade and to accompany him on trips. In time of war he was batman to the hoplite. The female slave carried out domestic tasks, in particular bread baking and textile making.

== Demographics ==
=== Population ===
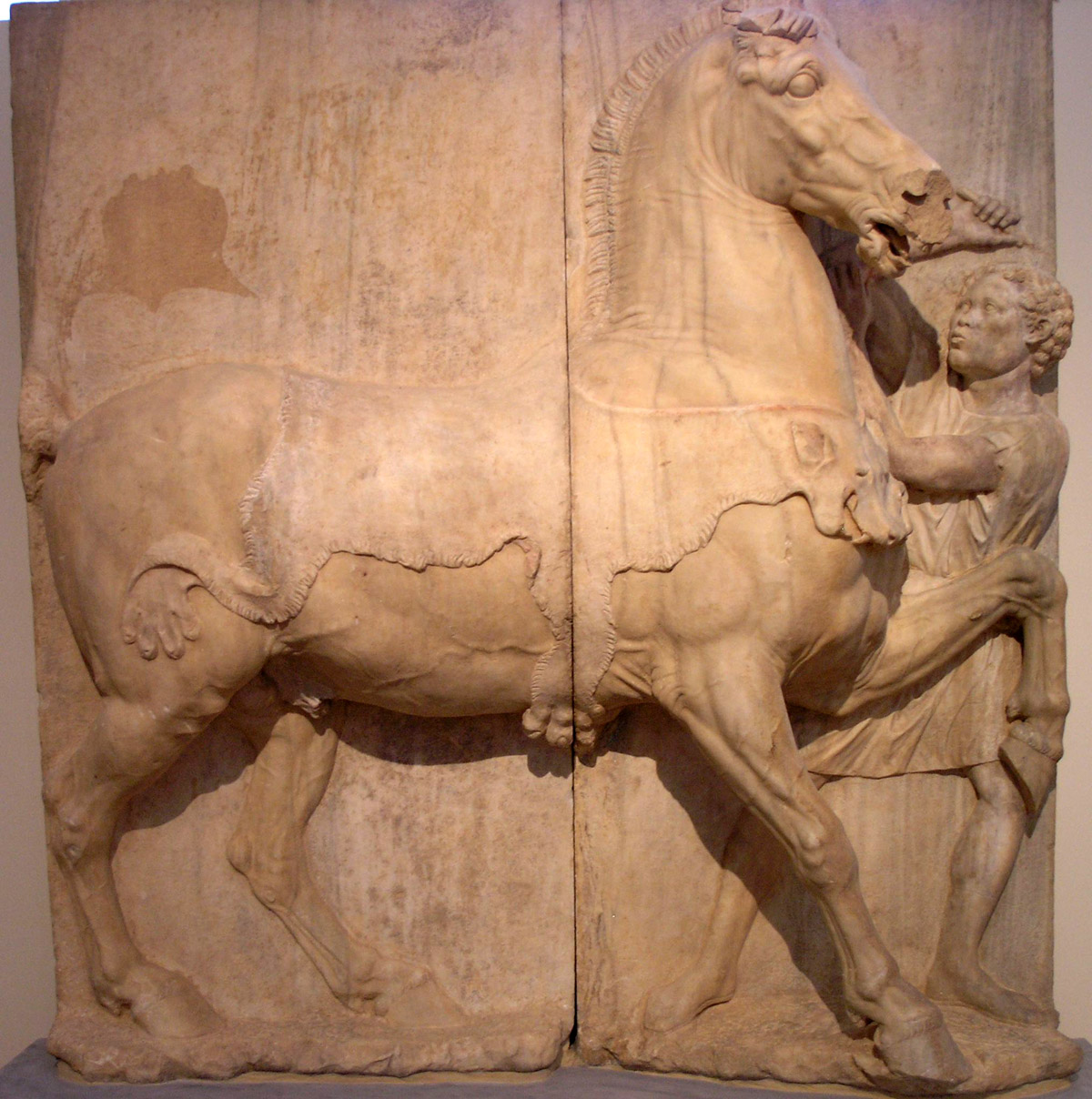
An Ethiopian slave attempts to break in a horse, date unknown, National Archaeological Museum of Athens

It is difficult to estimate the number of slaves in ancient Greece, given the lack of a precise census and variations in definitions during that era. It seems certain that Athens had the largest slave population, with as many as 80,000 in the 6th and 5th centuries BC, on average three or four slaves per household. In the 5th century BC, Thucydides remarked on the desertion of 20,890 slaves during the war of Decelea, mostly tradesmen. The lowest estimate, of 20,000 slaves, during the time of Demosthenes, corresponds to one slave per family. Between 317 BC and 307 BC, the tyrant Demetrius Phalereus ordered a general census of Attica, which arrived at the following figures: 21,000 citizens, 10,000 metics and 400,000 slaves. However, some researchers doubt the accuracy of the figure, asserting that thirteen slaves per free man appear unlikely in a state where a dozen slaves were a sign of wealth, nor is the population stated consistent with the known figures for bread production and import. The orator Hypereides, in his Against Areistogiton, recalls that the effort to enlist 15,000 male slaves of military age led to the defeat of the Southern Greeks at the Battle of Chaeronea (338 BC), which corresponds to the figures of Ctesicles.

According to the literature, it appears that the majority of free Athenians owned at least one slave. Aristophanes, in Plutus, portrays poor peasants who have several slaves; Aristotle defines a house as containing freemen and slaves. Conversely, not owning even one slave was a clear sign of poverty. In the celebrated discourse of Lysias For the Invalid, a cripple pleading for a pension explains "my income is very small and now I'm required to do these things myself and do not even have the means to purchase a slave who can do these things for me." However, the huge individual slave holdings of the wealthiest Romans were unknown in ancient Greece. When Athenaeus cites the case of Mnason, a friend of Aristotle and owner of a thousand slaves, this appears to be exceptional.

Thucydides estimates that the isle of Chios had proportionally the largest number of slaves.

=== Sources of supply ===
There were four primary sources of slaves: war, in which the defeated would become slaves to the victorious unless a more objective outcome was reached; piracy (at sea); banditry (on land); and international trade.

==== War ====
By the rules of war of the period, the victor possessed absolute rights over the vanquished, whether they were soldiers or not. Enslavement, while not systematic, was common practice. Thucydides reports that the inhabitants of Hyccara in Sicily were taken prisoner by Nicias and sold for 120 talents in the neighboring village of Catania. Likewise in 348 BC the population of Olynthus was reduced to slavery, as was that of Thebes in 335 BC by Alexander the Great and that of Mantineia by the Achaean League.

The existence of Greek slaves was a constant source of discomfort for Greek citizens. The enslavement of cities was also a controversial practice. Some generals refused, such as the Spartans Agesilaus II and Callicratidas. Some cities passed accords to forbid the practice: in the middle of the 3rd century BC, Miletus agreed not to reduce any free Knossian to slavery, and vice versa. Conversely, the emancipation by ransom of a city that had been entirely reduced to slavery carried great prestige: Cassander, in 316 BC, restored Thebes. Before him, Philip II of Macedon enslaved and then emancipated Stageira.

==== Piracy and banditry ====
Piracy and banditry provided a significant and consistent supply of slaves, though the significance of this source varied according to era and region. Pirates and brigands would demand ransom whenever the status of their catch warranted it. Whenever ransom was not paid or not warranted, captives would be sold to a trafficker. In certain areas, piracy was practically a national specialty, described by Thucydides as "the old-fashioned" way of life. Such was the case in Acarnania, Crete, and Aetolia. Outside of Greece, this was also the case with Illyrians, Phoenicians, and Etruscans. During the Hellenistic period, Cilicians and the mountain peoples from the coasts of Anatolia could also be added to the list. Strabo explains the popularity of the practice among the Cilicians by its profitability; Delos, not far away, allowed for "moving myriad slaves daily". The growing influence of the Roman Republic, a large consumer of slaves, led to development of the market and an aggravation of piracy. In the 1st century BC, however, the Romans largely eradicated piracy to protect the Mediterranean trade routes.

Slave raids were a specific form of banditry that was a primary method of gathering slaves. In regions such as Thrace and the eastern Aegean, natives, or barbaroi, captured in slave raids were the primary source of slaves, rather than prisoners of war. As described by Xenophon, and Menander in Aspis, after the slaves were captured in raids, their actual enslavement took place when they were resold through slave-dealers to Athenians and other slaveowners throughout Greece. After the slaves were captured, they were sold in slave markets. From the 6th century BC on, the vast majority of slaves were bought in these slave markets.

==== Slave trade ====
Trade in slaves operated between kingdoms and states of the wider region. The fragmentary list of slaves confiscated from the property of the mutilators of the Hermai in 415 BC mentions 32 slaves whose origins have been ascertained: 13 came from Thrace, 7 from Caria, and the others came from Cappadocia, Scythia, Phrygia, Lydia, Syria, Ilyria, Macedon, and the Peloponnese. Local professionals sold their own people to Greek slave-merchants. The principal centres of the slave trade appear to have been Ephesus, Byzantium, and Tanais at the mouth of the Don (a centre of the Black Sea slave trade). Some "barbarian" slaves were victims of war or localised piracy; others were sold by their parents. Barbarian areas such as Scythia could also maintain their own pools of slaves.

There is a lack of direct evidence of slave traffic, but corroborating evidence exists. Firstly, certain nationalities are consistently and significantly represented in the slave population, such as the corps of Scythian archers employed by Athens as a police force—originally 300, but eventually nearly a thousand in number. Secondly, the names given to slaves in the comedies often expressed a geographical link; thus Thratta, used by Aristophanes in The Wasps, The Acharnians, and Peace, simply meant a Thracian woman. Finally, the nationality of a slave was a significant criterion for major purchasers: contemporaneous practice avoided a concentration of too many slaves of the same ethnic origin in the same place, in order to limit the risk of revolt. It is also probable that, as with the Romans, certain nationalities were considered more productive as slaves than others.

The price of slaves varied in accordance with their ability. Xenophon valued a Laurion miner at 180 drachmas (i.e. about 775 grams of silver) — a workman at major works was paid one drachma per day. Demosthenes' father's cutlers were valued at 500 to 600 drachmas each. Price was also a function of the quantity of slaves available; in the 4th century BC slaves were abundant and thus a buyer's market developed. The market cities levied a tax on sale revenues. For instance, a large helot market was organized during the festivities at the temple of Apollo at Actium. The Acarnanian League, which was in charge of the logistics, received half of the tax proceeds, the other half going to the city of Anactorion, of which Actium was a part.

Buyers enjoyed a guarantee against latent defects: the transaction could be invalidated if the purchased slave turned out to be crippled and the buyer had not been warned.

== Status of slaves ==
The Greeks had many degrees of enslavement. There was a multitude of categories, ranging from free citizen to chattel slave, and including penestae or helots, disenfranchised citizens, freedmen, bastards, and metics. The common ground was the deprivation of civic rights.

Moses Finley proposed a set of criteria for different degrees of enslavement:

- Right to own property
- Authority over the work of another
- Power of punishment over another
- Legal rights and duties (liability to arrest and/or arbitrary punishment, or to litigate)
- Familial rights and privileges (marriage, inheritance, etc.)
- Possibility of social mobility (manumission or emancipation, access to citizen rights)
- Religious rights and obligations
- Military rights and obligations (military service as servant, heavy or light soldier, or sailor).

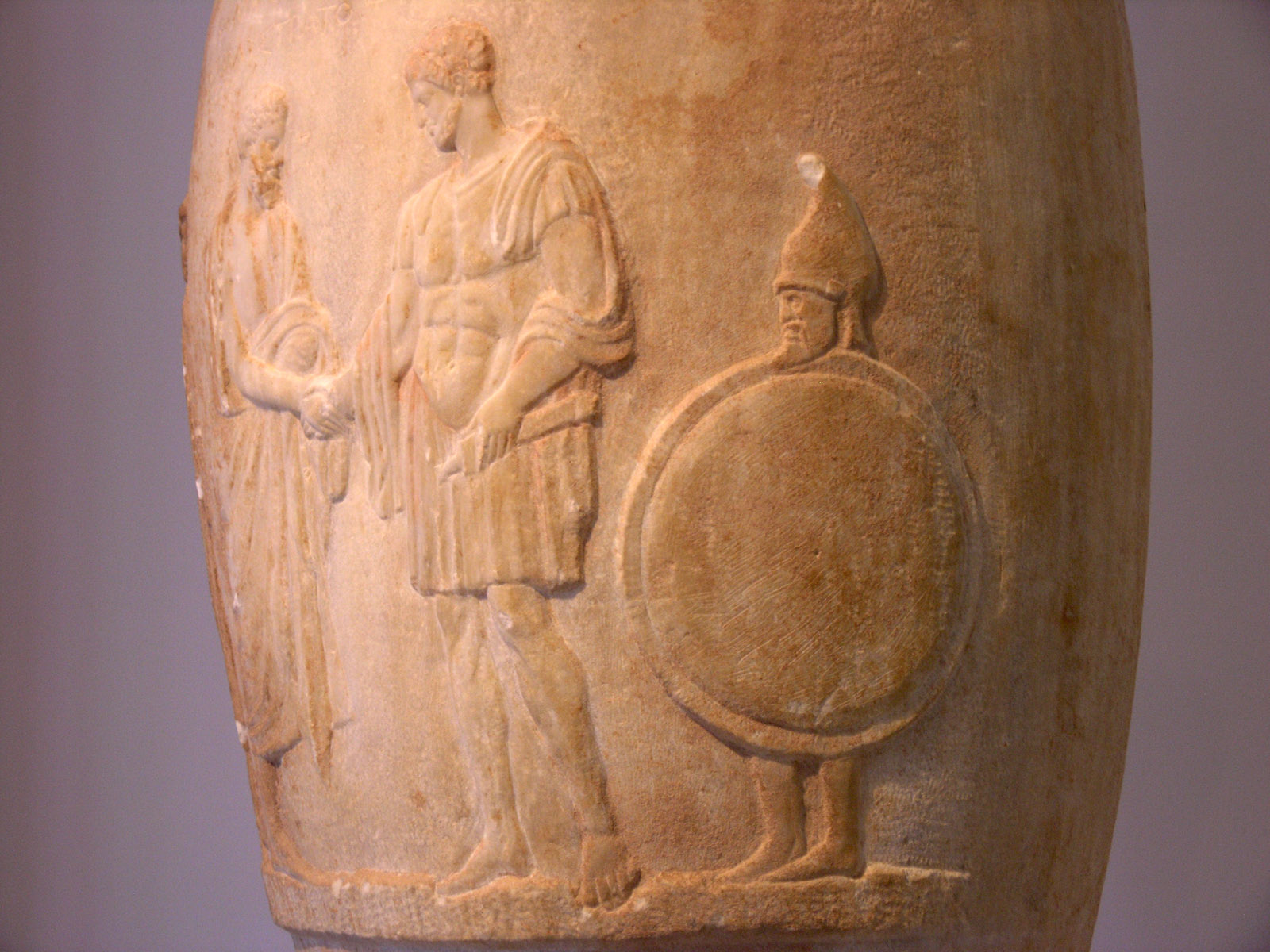
Funerary loutrophoros; on the right, a bearded slave carries his master's shield and helm, 380–370 BC, National Archaeological Museum of Athens

Athenian slaves were the property of their master (or of the state). Masters could dispose of their slaves as they saw fit by selling or renting them, or by granting them freedom. Slaves could have a spouse and children, but slave familial relationships were not recognized by the state, and the master could scatter the family members at any time.

Slaves had fewer judicial rights than citizens and were represented by their masters in all judicial proceedings. A misdemeanor that would result in a fine for the free man would result in a flogging for the slave; the ratio seems to have been one lash for one drachma. With several minor exceptions, the testimony of a slave was not admissible except under torture. Slaves were tortured in trials because they often remained loyal to their masters. A famous example of a trusty slave was Themistocles's Persian slave Sicinnus (the counterpart of Ephialtes of Trachis), who, despite his Persian origin, betrayed Xerxes and helped Athenians in the Battle of Salamis. Despite torture in trials, the Athenian slave was protected in an indirect way: if he was mistreated, the master could initiate litigation for damages and interest (δίκη βλάβης / dikē blabēs). Conversely, a master who excessively mistreated a slave could be prosecuted by any citizen (γραφὴ ὕβρεως / graphē hybreōs); this was not enacted for the sake of the slave, but to avoid violent excess (ὕβρις / hubris).

Isocrates claimed that "not even the most worthless slave can be put to death without trial"; the master's power over his slave was not absolute. Draco's law apparently punished with death the murder of a slave; the underlying principle was: "was the crime such that, if it became more widespread, it would do serious harm to society?" The suit that could be brought against a slave's killer was not a suit for damages, as would be the case for the killing of cattle, but a δίκη φονική (dikē phonikē), demanding punishment for the religious pollution brought by the shedding of blood. In the 4th century BC, the suspect was judged by the Palladion, a court which had jurisdiction over unintentional homicide; the imposed penalty seems to have been more than a fine but less than death—maybe exile, as was the case in the murder of a Metic. However, slaves did belong to their master's household. A newly bought slave was welcomed with nuts and fruits, just like a newly-wed wife. Slaves took part in most of the civic and family cults; they were expressly invited to join the banquet of the Choes, the second day of the Anthesteria, and were allowed initiation into the Eleusinian Mysteries. A slave could claim asylum in a temple or at an altar, just like a free man. The slaves shared the gods of their masters and could keep their own religious customs if any.

Slaves could not own property, but their masters often let them save up to purchase their freedom, and records survive of slaves operating businesses by themselves, making only a fixed tax-payment to their masters. Athens also had a law forbidding the striking of slaves: if a person struck what appeared to be a slave in Athens, that person might find himself hitting a fellow citizen because many citizens dressed no better. It astonished other Greeks that Athenians tolerated back-chat from slaves. Athenian slaves fought together with Athenian freemen at the battle of Marathon, and the monuments memorialize them. It was formally decreed before the Battle of Salamis that the citizens should "save themselves, their women, children, and slaves".

Slaves had special sexual restrictions and obligations. For example, a slave could not engage free boys in pederastic relationships ("A slave shall not be the lover of a free boy nor follow after him, or else he shall receive fifty blows of the public lash."), and they were forbidden from the palaestrae ("A slave shall not take exercise or anoint himself in the wrestling-schools."). Both laws are attributed to Solon.

The sons of vanquished foes would be enslaved and often forced to work in male brothels, as in the case of Phaedo of Elis, who at the request of Socrates was bought and freed from such an enterprise by the philosopher's rich friends. On the other hand, it is attested in sources that the rape of slaves was prosecuted, at least occasionally.

=== Slaves in Gortyn ===
In Gortyn, in Crete, according to a code engraved in stone dating to the 3rd century BC, slaves (doulos or oikeus) found themselves in a state of great dependence. Their children belonged to the master. The master was responsible for all their offences, and, inversely, he received amends for crimes committed against his slaves by others. In the Gortyn code, where all punishment was monetary, fines were doubled for slaves committing a misdemeanour or felony. Conversely, an offence committed against a slave was much less expensive than an offence committed against a free person. As an example, the rape of a free woman by a slave was punishable by a fine of 200 staters (400 drachms), while the rape of a non-virgin slave by another slave brought a fine of only one obolus (a sixth of a drachm).

Slaves did have the right to possess a house and livestock, which could be transmitted to descendants, as could clothing and household furnishings. Their family was recognized by law: they could marry, divorce, write a testament and inherit just like free men.

=== Debt bondage ===
Debt, especially in the agricultural field, was a very common occurrence in ancient Greece. A large portion of the Greek population was composed of peasants, of varying degrees of freedom, who survived on subsistence farming. Thus, lending and borrowing, and consequently incurring debts, was central to peasant life. Peasants could incur debt for a number of reasons. First, given the nature of their agricultural labor, they often borrowed tools, livestock, or sowing material, and these debts could roll over to the next day. As soon as debts surpassed day-to-day reciprocity, it became more and more difficult for peasants to pay off their loans. Thus, the laborer became indebted to the owner of the land they were working on, becoming indebted to the creditor. Soon after, the debtor might have had to give his property, and eventually his wife, children, and ultimately himself, over to the creditor, thus becoming entirely dependent and virtually enslaved to the creditor.

Prior to its interdiction by Solon, Athenians practiced debt enslavement: a citizen incapable of paying his debts became "enslaved" to the creditor. Debt bondage primarily concerned peasants known as hektēmoroi who, unable to pay their rents, worked land owned by rich landowners. In theory, debt bondage slaves would be liberated when their original debts were repaid.

Solon put an end to debt bondage with the σεισάχθεια / seisachtheia, literally "the shaking off of burdens", or liberation of debts, which prevented all claim to the person by the debtor and forbade the sale of free Athenians, including by themselves. Scholars believe that Solon got the idea for the cancellation of debts from Mesopotamian law. Aristotle in his Constitution of the Athenians quotes one of Solon's poems:

And many a man whom fraud or law had sold
Far from his god-built land, an outcast slave,
I brought again to Athens; yea, and some,
Exiles from home through debt’s oppressive load,
Speaking no more the dear Athenian tongue,
But wandering far and wide, I brought again;
And those that here in vilest slavery (douleia)
Crouched 'neath a master's (despōtes) frown, I set them free.

Though much of Solon's poem is reminiscent of "traditional" slavery, debt bondage slavery was different in that the enslaved Athenian remained an Athenian, dependent on another Athenian, in his place of birth. It is in these lines that Solon put an end to debt bondage. This measure, which received much praise in antiquity, was merely a cancellation of debts. The seisachtheia were not intended to free all Greek slaves but only those enslaved by debt. The reforms of Solon left two exceptions: the guardian of an unmarried woman who had lost her virginity had the right to sell her as a slave, and a citizen could "expose" (abandon) unwanted newborn children.

=== Manumission ===
The practice of manumission is confirmed to have existed in Chios from the 6th century BC. It probably dates back to an earlier period, as it was an oral procedure. Informal emancipations are also confirmed in the classical period. It was sufficient to have witnesses, who would escort the citizen to a public emancipation of his slave, either at the theatre or before a public tribunal. This practice was outlawed in Athens in the middle of the 6th century BC to avoid public disorder.

The practice became more common in the 4th century BC and gave rise to inscriptions in stone which have been recovered from shrines such as Delphi and Dodona. They primarily date to the 2nd and 1st centuries BC, and the 1st century AD. Collective manumission was possible; an example is known from the 2nd century BC in the island of Thasos. It probably took place during a period of war as a reward for the slaves' loyalty, but in most cases the documentation deals with a voluntary act on the part of the master (predominantly male, but in the Hellenistic period also female).

One inscription from Delphi records a rare manumission in a pagan temple by an individual named 'Ioudaios' ('Jew'), a name that may indicate the manumitter was himself a freed slave using his ethnic identity as a personal name.

The slave was often required to pay for himself an amount at least equivalent to his market value. To this end they could use their savings or take a so-called "friendly" loan (ἔρανος / eranos) from their master, a friend or a client like the hetaera Neaira did.

Emancipation was often of a religious nature, where the slave was considered to be "sold" to a deity, often Delphian Apollo, or was consecrated after his emancipation. The temple would receive a portion of the monetary transaction and would guarantee the contract. The manumission could also be entirely civil, in which case the magistrate played the role of the deity.

The slave's freedom could be either total or partial, at the master's whim. In the former, the emancipated slave was legally protected against all attempts at re-enslavement—for instance, on the part of the former master's inheritors. In the latter case, the emancipated slave could be liable to a number of obligations to the former master. The most restrictive contract was the paramone, a type of enslavement of limited duration during which time the master retained practically absolute rights. If a former master sued the former slave for not fulfilling a duty, however, and the slave was found innocent, the latter gained complete freedom from all duties toward the former. Some inscriptions imply a mock process of that type could be used for a master to grant his slave complete freedom in a legally binding manner.

In regard to the city, the emancipated slave was far from equal to a citizen by birth. He was liable to all types of obligations, as one can see from the proposals of Plato in The Laws: presentation three times monthly at the home of the former master, forbidden to become richer than him, etc. In fact, the status of emancipated slaves was similar to that of metics, the residing foreigners, who were free but did not enjoy a citizen's rights.

=== Spartan slaves ===
Spartan citizens used helots, an enslaved group (that formed the majority of the population) collectively owned by the state. It is uncertain whether Spartan citizens had chattel slaves as well. There are mentions of people manumitted by Spartans, which was supposedly forbidden for helots, or sold outside of Laconia. For example, the poet Alcman; a Philoxenos from Cytherea, reputedly enslaved with all his fellow citizens when his city was conquered, was later sold to an Athenian; a Spartan cook bought by Dionysius the Elder or by a king of Pontus, both versions being mentioned by Plutarch; and the famous Spartan nurses, much appreciated by Athenian parents.

Some texts mention both slaves and helots, which seems to indicate that they were not the same thing. Plato in Alcibiades I cites "the ownership of slaves, and notably helots" among the Spartan riches, and Plutarch writes about "slaves and helots". Finally, according to Thucydides, the agreement that ended the 464 BC revolt of helots stated that any Messenian rebel who might hereafter be found within the Peloponnese was "to be the slave of his captor", which means that the ownership of chattel slaves was not illegal at that time.

Most historians thus concur that chattel slaves were indeed used in the Greek city-state of Sparta, at least after the Lacedemonian victory of 404 BC against Athens, but not in great numbers and only among the upper classes. As it was in the other Greek cities, chattel slaves could be purchased at the market or taken in war.

Numa Denis Fustel de Coulanges mentions that there was a hierarchy of classes superposed one above the other in the Spartan society. If the Helots and the Laconians are left out, the hierarchy would be as follows: first there were the Neodamodes (former slaves freed), then the Epeunactae (helots who slept with Spartan widows in order to help Sparta with manpower shortage because of war casualties), then the Mothaces (very similar to domestic clients) and then the bastards (who though descended from true Spartans, were separated).

=== Athenian slaves ===
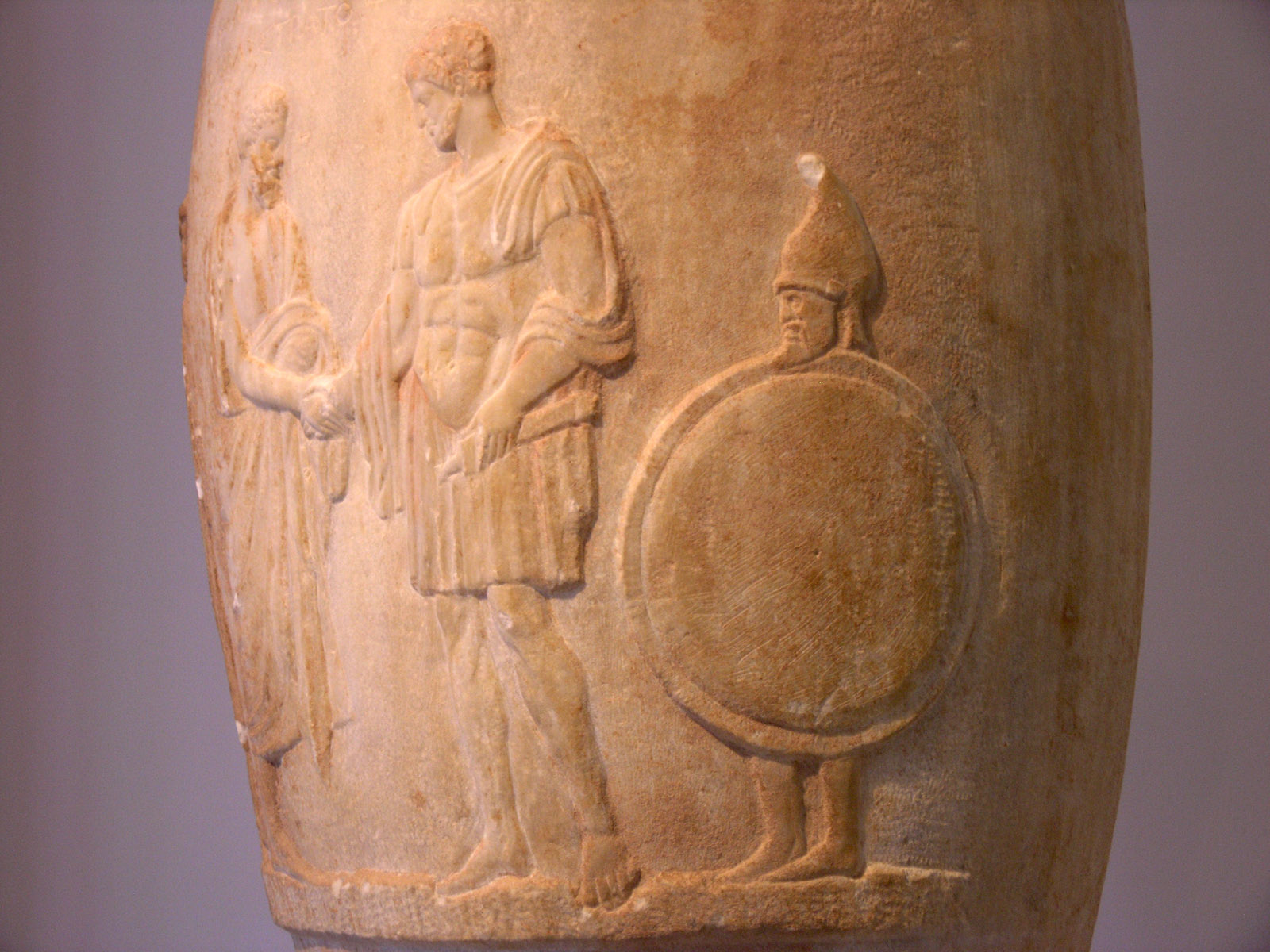
Funerary loutrophoros; on the right, a bearded slave carries his master's shield and helm, 380–370 BC, National Archaeological Museum of Athens

== Social death ==
Orlando Patterson's theory of social death says that the institution of slavery robs the slave of his or her "socially recognized existence outside of his master", effectively transforming the slave into a "social nonperson." By this definition, Greek slaves can be considered socially dead. According to Patterson's definition, there were several criteria that qualified a slave as socially dead. First, they were likely uprooted from kin groups and their homeland, and displaced in a new foreign land. The effect of physically relocating slaves was that they were seen as fundamentally different from the citizen population at any given time, alienating the slave and thus making it easier to justify their abuse and maltreatment. Second, the slaves subjection was permanent, and could only be terminated by the master. Third, socially dead slaves were "dishonored, devalued, and victims of gratuitous violence."

Looking at slavery in ancient Greece through the lens of social death offers insight regarding the daily lived experiences of ancient Greek slaves. According to Patterson, "slavery is the permanent, violent domination of natally alienated and generally dishonored persons," and all slaves are socially dead. The aforementioned aspects of social death shall be examined below in the context of ancient Greek slavery: the natal alienation of slaves, the permanence of a slave's enslavement, and the dishonor, domination, and violence.

=== Natal alienation ===
Patterson argues that the alienation of the slave from their birthplace and natal culture was the single most salient factor in determining whether a slave was socially dead or not. In ancient Greece, a binary system of classification categorized all people into one of two categories: Greek or non-Greek. Non-Greek peoples were called barbaroi, they could have either been born outside Greece, or have been born inside Greece to foreigners. This dichotomy reinforced the view of non-Greeks as fundamentally "The Other". This "Othering" of foreigners very likely made it psychologically easier for Athenians to "deny personhood" to someone who was seen as essentially different from themselves, thus making it easier to enslave non-Greeks and deprive them of their humanity. Consequently, barbarois became inextricably associated with slaves, and conversely, eleutheros became synonymous with Greek citizenship.

The capture of prisoners of war and slave raids during warfare between Greek and non-Greek territories were two primary ways of obtaining slaves in Classical Greece. This meant that the majority of the slave population was composed of non-Greeks. This relocation of slaves alienated them from the birthrights from their natal clan, village, or community, relegating the enslaved population to permanent outsiders.

=== Permanence ===
While it was possible for individual ancient Greek slaves to be freed, manumission was always in the hands of the owner. Slavery was heritable, meaning that even if an individual slave was granted freedom, their children would still likely be slaves. The permanence of many Greek slaves subjection and the perpetuity of enslavement over generations of a family was therefore indicative of their status as unfree members of society, since their freedom was on someone else's terms and never their own.

=== General dishonor, domination and violence ===
Perhaps the most salient feature of the social death of slaves was the dishonor and dehumanization they experienced at the hands of the slave-owning class. Slaves were seen as property: their only value was tied to their physical capacity for labor. This is reflected in Aristotle's work Politics, in which he provides a blunt conceptualization of slaves as property: they are nothing but "living tools" and "animate property". This viewpoint was shared by the rest of free Greek society.

Slaves were subject to corporal punishment, while free citizens were not, further differentiating the slave class from the rest of society. Flogging, verbal chastisement, and various forms of torture were characteristic of a slave's subjection. There was also a legal requirement that slave testimony in court be extracted via torture. Litigants would offer up their slave, who would be stretched out on a rack and whipped, and sometimes even killed, while giving their testimony. It is also not surprising that slaves were subject to physical violence in the private sphere as well: owners were free to whip, torture but not kill the slaves.

== Slavery conditions ==
It is difficult to appreciate the condition of Greek slaves. According to Aristotle, the daily routine of slaves could be summed up in three words: "work, discipline, and feeding". Xenophon notes the accepted practice of treating slaves as domestic animals, that is to say punishing them for disobedience and rewarding them for good behaviour. For his part, Aristotle prefers to see slaves treated as children and to use not only orders but also recommendations, as the slave is capable of understanding reasons when they are explained.

Greek literature abounds with scenes of slaves being flogged; it was a means of forcing them to work, as were control of rations, clothing, and rest. This violence could be meted out by the master or the supervisor, who was possibly also a slave. Thus, at the beginning of Aristophanes' The Knights (4–5), two slaves complain of being "bruised and thrashed without respite" by their new supervisor. However, Aristophanes himself cites what is a typical old saw in ancient Greek comedy:

He also dismissed those slaves who kept on running off, or deceiving someone, or getting whipped. They were always led out crying, so one of their fellow slaves could mock the bruises and ask then: 'Oh you poor miserable fellow, what's happened to your skin? Surely a huge army of lashes from a whip has fallen down on you and laid waste your back?'

The condition of slaves varied very much according to their status; the mine slaves of Laurion and the pornai (brothel prostitutes) lived a particularly brutal existence, while public slaves, craftsmen, tradesmen and bankers enjoyed relative independence. In return for a fee (ἀποφορά / apophora) paid to their master, they could live and work alone. They could thus earn some money on the side, sometimes enough to purchase their freedom. Potential emancipation was indeed a powerful motivator, though the real scale of this is difficult to estimate.

Ancient writers considered that Attic slaves enjoyed a "peculiarly happy lot": Pseudo-Xenophon deplores the liberties taken by Athenian slaves: "as for the slaves and Metics of Athens, they take the greatest licence; you cannot just strike them, and they do not step aside to give you free passage". This alleged good treatment did not prevent 20,000 Athenian slaves from running away at the end of the Peloponnesian War at the incitement of the Spartan garrison at Attica in Decelea. These were principally skilled artisans (kheirotekhnai), probably among the better-treated slaves, although some researchers believe them to be mainly workers of the mines of Laurion, whose conditions were infamously harsh. The title of a 4th-century comedy by Antiphanes, The Runaway-catcher (Δραπεταγωγός), suggests that slave flight was not uncommon.

Conversely, there are no records of a large-scale Greek slave revolt comparable to that of Spartacus in Rome. It can probably be explained by the relative dispersion of Greek slaves, which would have prevented any large-scale planning. Slave revolts were rare, even in Rome. Individual acts of rebellion of slaves against their master, though scarce, are not unheard of; a judicial speech mentions the attempted murder of his master by a boy slave, not 12 years old.

== Views of Greek slavery ==
=== Historical views ===
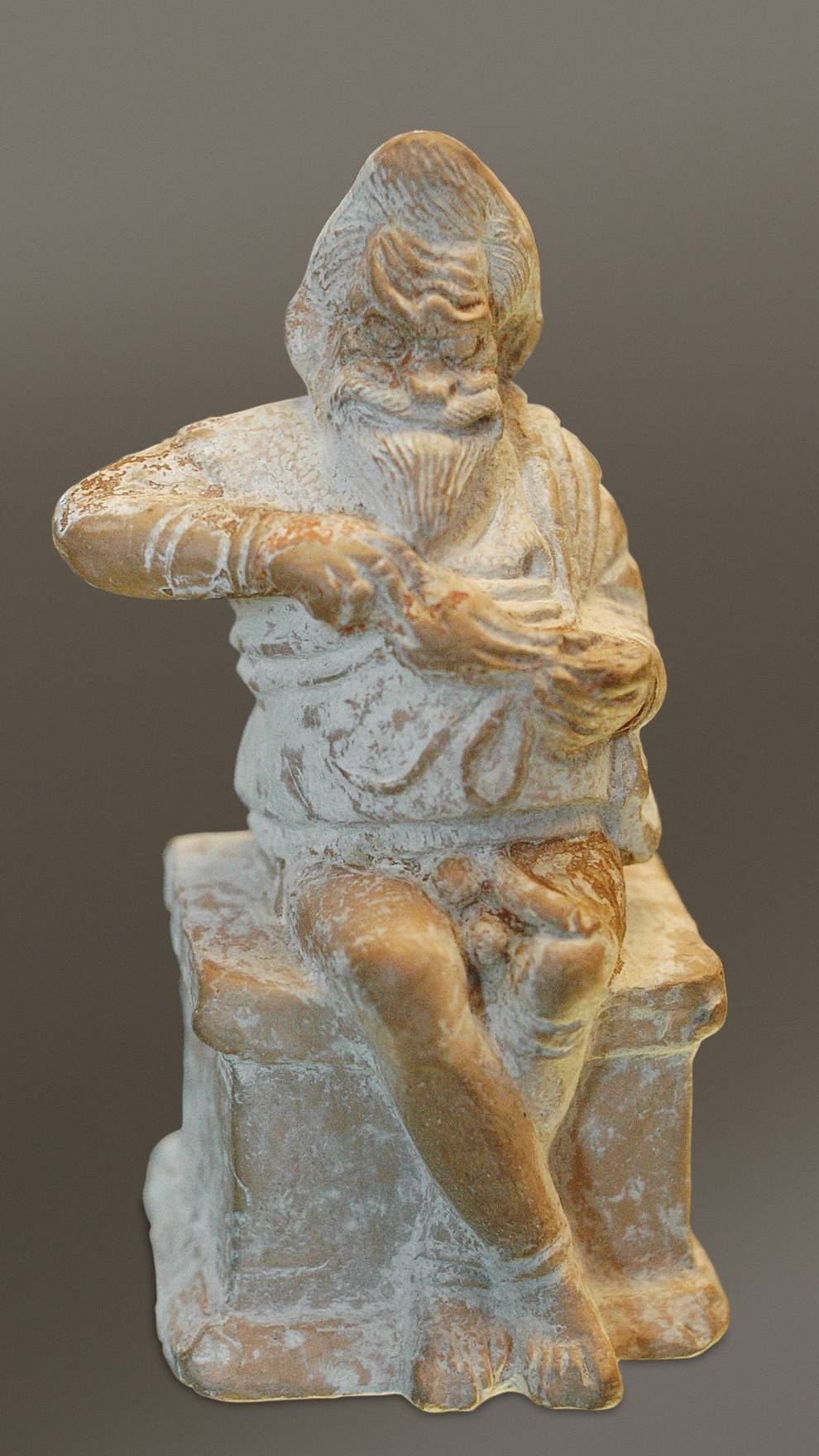
Depiction of a slave seated on an altar, looking at the purse he is about to steal, c. 400–375 BC, Louvre

Very few authors of antiquity call slavery into question. To Homer and the pre-classical authors, slavery was an inevitable consequence of war. Heraclitus states that "[w]ar is the father of all, the king of all...he turns some into slaves and sets others free." Aristotle also felt this way, stating "the law by which whatever is taken in war is supposed to belong to the victors." He also states that it might have a few issues, though, "For what if the cause of war be unjust?" If the war was because of an unfair or incorrect reason, should the victors of that war be allowed to take the losers as slaves?

During the classical period the main justification for slavery was economic. From a philosophical point of view, the idea of "natural" slavery emerged at the same time; thus, as Aeschylus states in The Persians, the Greeks "[o]f no man are they called the slaves or vassals", while the Persians, as Euripides states in Helen, "are all slaves, except one"—the Great King. Hippocrates theorizes about this latent idea at the end of the 5th century BC. According to him, the temperate climate of Anatolia produced a placid and submissive people. This explanation is reprised by Plato, then Aristotle in Politics, where he develops the concept of "natural slavery": "for he that can foresee with his mind is naturally ruler and naturally master, and he that can do these things with his body is subject and naturally a slave." As opposed to an animal, a slave can comprehend reason but "…has not got the deliberative part at all."

Alcidamas, at the same time as Aristotle, took the opposite view, saying: "nature has made nobody a slave".

In parallel, the concept that all men, whether Greek or barbarian, belonged to the same race was being developed by the Sophists and thus that certain men were slaves although they had the soul of a freeman and vice versa. Aristotle himself recognized this possibility and argued that slavery could not be imposed unless the master was better than the slave, in keeping with his theory of "natural" slavery. The Sophists concluded that true servitude was not a matter of status but a matter of spirit; thus, as Menander stated, "be free in the mind, although you are slave: and thus you will no longer be a slave". This idea, repeated by the Stoics and the Epicurians, was not so much an opposition to slavery as a trivialization of it.

The Greeks could not comprehend an absence of slaves. Slaves exist even in the "Cloud cuckoo land" of Aristophanes' The Birds. The utopian cities of Phaleas of Chalcedon and Hippodamus of Miletus are based on the equal distribution of property, but public slaves are used respectively as craftsmen and land workers. The "reversed cities" placed women in power or even saw the end of private property, as in Lysistrata or Assemblywomen, but could not picture slaves in charge of masters. The only societies without slaves were those of the Golden Age, where all needs were met without anyone having to work. In this type of society, as explained by Plato, one reaped generously without sowing. In Telekleides' Amphictyons barley loaves fight with wheat loaves for the honor of being eaten by men. Moreover, objects move themselves—dough kneads itself, and the jug pours itself. The same is pictured in a surviving fragment by Crates, where a man proposes to abolish slavery by making the objects themselves obey spoken orders. Similarly, Aristotle said that slaves would not be necessary "if every instrument could accomplish its own work... the shuttle would weave and the plectrum touch the lyre without a hand to guide them", like the legendary constructs of Daedalus and Hephaestus. Society without slaves is thus relegated to a different time and space. In a "normal" society, one needs slaves. Aristotle argues that slaves are a necessity though, saying "Property is part of the household, ... For no man can live well or indeed live at all, unless he be provided with necessaries." He also argues that slaves are the most important part of the property as they "take precedence of all the instruments." This would suggest that at least some slaves would be treated well for the same reason one would take great care of their most important tools. By viewing slaves as tools of a household, it creates another reason for acceptance of slavery. Aristotle says "indeed the use of slaves and of tame animals is not very different," showing as well that at least in part, some slaves were thought of no higher than the common tamed animals in use at the time. Antiphon viewed slaves as a bit more than common animals or tools. On the topic of a man killing his own slave, he says that the man should "purify himself and withhold himself from those places prescribed by law, in the hope that by doing so he will best avoid disaster." This suggests that there still is some sense of inappropriateness in killing a slave, even one owned by the killer.

Punishment of slaves would have been swift and harsh. Demosthenes viewed punishment for slaves as acceptable in the form of physical harm or injuries for all that they may have done wrong, stating "the body of a slave is made responsible for all his misdeeds, whereas corporal punishment is the last penalty to inflict on a free man." This was spoken about in legal proceedings, suggesting that it would have been a widely accepted way of treating slaves.

=== Modern views ===
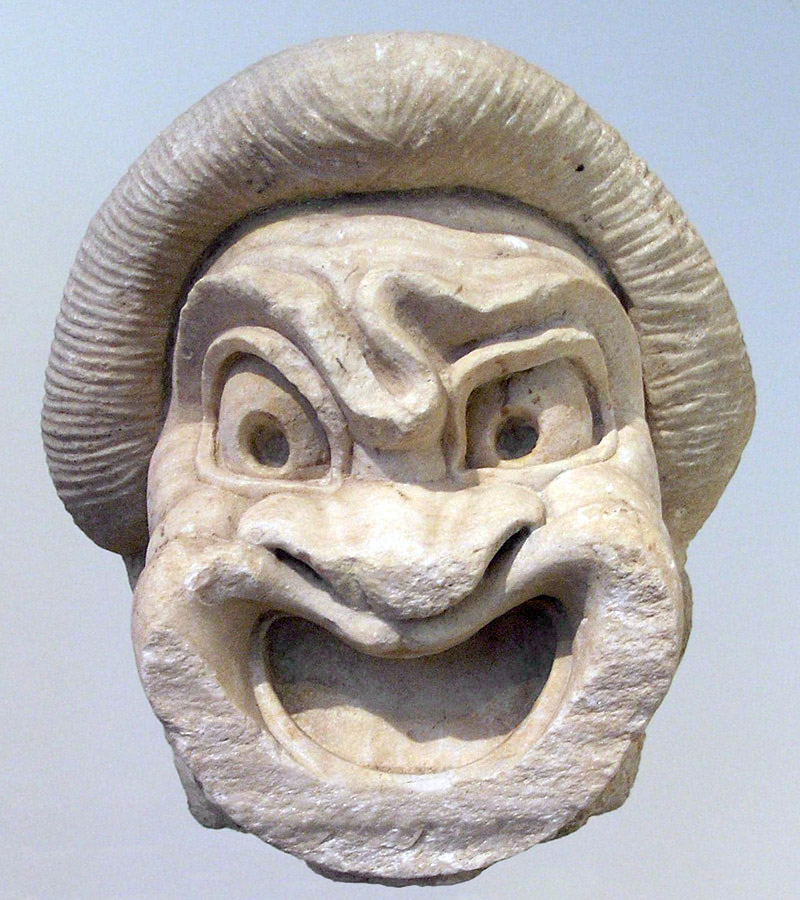
Theatre mask of a First slave in Greek comedy, 2nd century BC, National Archaeological Museum of Athens

Slavery in Greek antiquity has long been an object of apologetic discourse among Christians, who are typically awarded the merit of its collapse. From the 16th century the discourse became moralizing in nature. The existence of colonial slavery had significant impact on the debate, with some authors lending it civilizing merits and others denouncing its misdeeds. Thus Henri-Alexandre Wallon in 1847 published a History of Slavery in Antiquity among his works for the abolition of slavery in the French colonies.

In the 19th century, a politico-economic discourse emerged. It concerned itself with distinguishing the phases in the organisation of human societies and correctly identifying the place of Greek slavery. According to Karl Marx, the ancient society was characterized by development of private ownership and the dominant (and not secondary as in other pre-capitalist societies) character of slavery as a mode of production. The Positivists represented by the historian Eduard Meyer (Slavery in Antiquity, 1898) were soon to oppose the Marxist theory. According to him slavery was the foundation of Greek democracy. It was thus a legal and social phenomenon, and not economic.

Current historiography developed in the 20th century; led by authors such as Joseph Vogt, it saw in slavery the conditions for the development of elites. Conversely, the theory also demonstrates an opportunity for slaves to join the elite. Finally, Vogt estimates that modern society, founded on humanist values, has surpassed this level of development.

In 2011, Greek slavery remains the subject of historiographical debate, on two questions in particular: can it be said that ancient Greece was a "slave society", and did Greek slaves comprise a social class?

== Aftermath: slavery in later Greece ==
=== Roman and Byzantine rule ===
Slavery in Ancient Greece continued under Roman rule from the 2nd century BC in the form of slavery in the Roman Empire.

During the Middle Ages, Greece was under Byzantine rule. Slavery in Byzantine Greece was under the laws of slavery in the Byzantine Empire. Initially, a major use for slave labor were the large agricultural estates, where the landowers could own thousands of slaves, but this form of slavery were gradually transformed in to serfdom during the centuries, which eventually made slavery in the Byzantine Empire reduced to a marginal urban phenomena. Many slaves were supplied as non-Christian war captives, and slavery in the Byzantine Empire reached its maximum during the Balkan war campaigns of the 10th century. After the Byzantine warfare against the Balkans was ended after the 10th century, slavery in the Byzantine Empire gradually diminished the following centuries. A small number of slaves for urban domestic slavery was, however, still imported in the 13th century.

=== Ottoman Greece ===
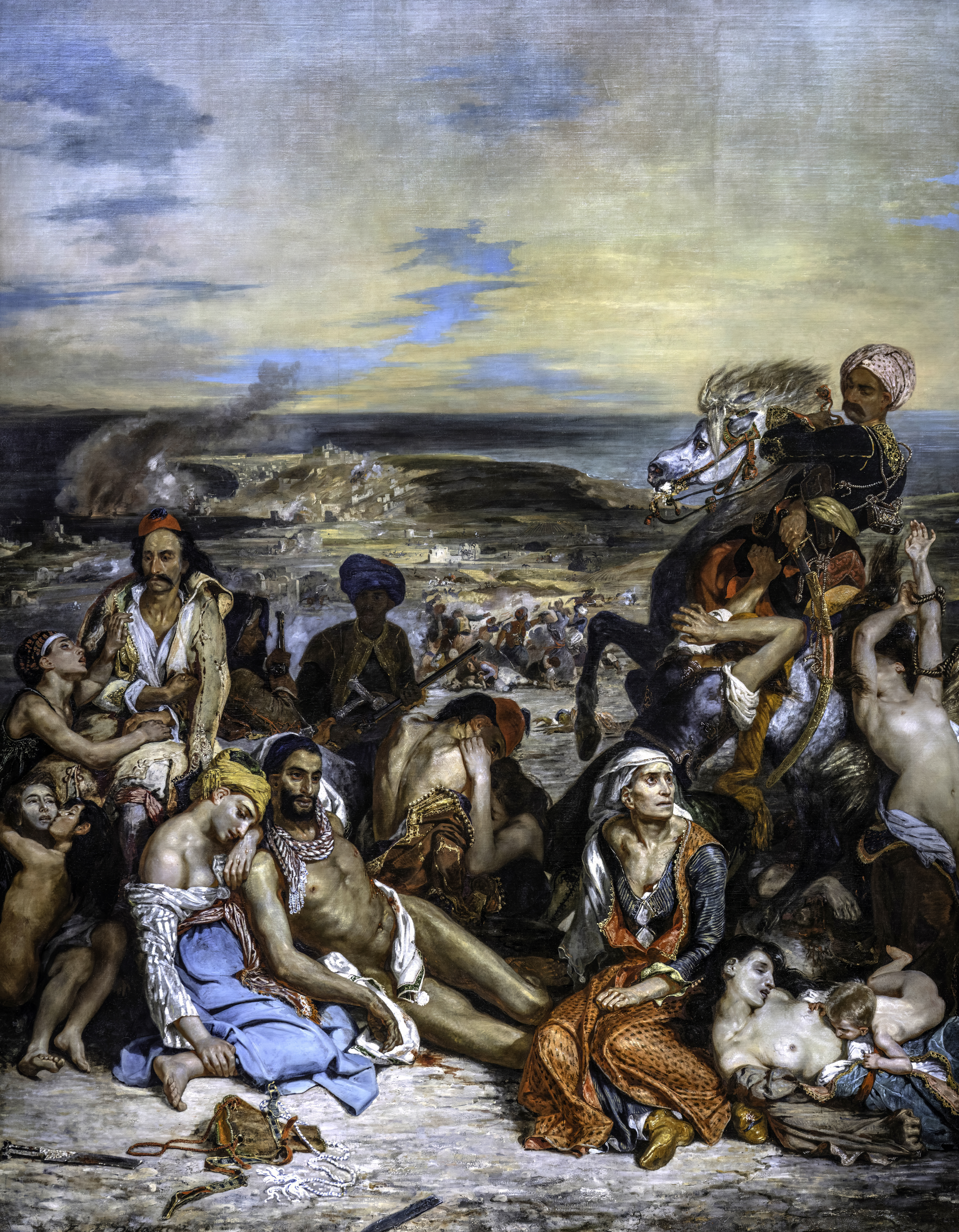
Eugène Delacroix, The Massacre at Chios, 1824

Byzantine rule was succeeded by Ottoman rule (1458–1830). Slavery in Ottoman Greece was practiced under the laws of slavery in the Ottoman Empire. During the conquests of the different states in the territory of later Greece, many Greeks were enslaved in accordance with Islamic law, which allowed the enslavement of kafir of Dar al-Harb (non-Muslims from non-Muslim lands).

In 1479, during the Ottoman conquest of the Despotate of Epirus, the islands of Santa Mavra, Cephalonia and Ithaka, the ducal officials were "cut to pieces", the castle of Cephalonia was burned and the peasantry was enslaved and taken to Constantinople as a gift to the sultan, who engaged in "slave breeding" by separating husbands and wives and "mating" them with Ethiopian slaves with the purpose of "producing a race of grey slaves", while other slaves from St Mavra were sold by Ahmed Pascha for ten soldi apiece.

In 1537, the Ottoman fleet under Admiral Hayreddin Barbarossa raided the Aegean islands and brought 2,000 captured people back to Constantinople as slaves, one of them being Nurbanu Sultan. The Ottoman conquest of Paros in 1537 resulted in atrocities committed against the public: as happened to the population in other islands during the Ottoman conquest of the Aegean islands, old men were killed; young men were made galley slaves; little boys were made janissaries; and the women where ordered to dance on the shore so that the conquerors could choose the most attractive for the lieutenants, enslaving around 6000 of the inhabitants of Paros for slavery in the Ottoman Empire.

Ottoman Greece was subjected to Ottoman law. Slavery in the Ottoman Empire was regulated by the Seriat, the religious Islamic Law, and by the secular Sultan's law Kanun, which was essentially supplementary regulations to facilitate the implementation of the Seriat law. The Islamic law regarding Islamic views on slavery legitimized enslavement by purchase of already enslaved people from middleman slave traders; by children born from two enslaved parents or from a slave mother without an acknowledged father; or by enslaving war captives, specifically kafir of Dar al-Harb, that is non-Muslims from non-Muslim lands, with whom Muslims of Dar al-Islam (the Muslim world) were by definition always in a state of war. A Muslim man was by law entitled to have sexual intercourse with his female slave (concubinage in Islam) without this being defined as extramarital sex (zina); if he chose to acknowledge paternity of a child with her the child would become free, and his mother would become umm walad and manumitted on the death of her enslaver; but if he did not acknowledge paternity both the child and mother would remain slaves, continuing the line of slavery.

During Ottoman rule, Greeks were subjected to the Devshirme slave system. In the devşirme, which connotes "draft", "blood tax" or "child collection", young Christian boys from the Balkans and Anatolia were taken from their homes and families, forcibly converted to Islam, and enlisted into the most famous branch of the Kapıkulu, the janissaries. Most of the military commanders of the Ottoman forces, imperial administrators, and de facto rulers of the Empire, such as Sokollu Mehmed Pasha, were recruited in this way. By 1609, the Sultan's Kapıkulu forces increased to about 100,000.

During the Greek War of Independence (1821–1829), the Ottoman practiced wide scale enslavement of Greeks. An occasion which attracted particular attention was the large-scale enslavement of the Greek population on Chios after the Chios massacre of 1822. This incident attracted great attention in Europe and gave the Ottoman Empire bad publicity. It ultimately resulted in the first anti-slavery reform in the Ottoman Empire, the Firman of 1830, which decreed the manumission of the Greek war prisoners. Kösem Sultan and Gülnuş Sultan were reportedy among the most known examples of the people enslaved in Serbia.

Enslavement of Greeks continued across the Ottoman Empire's remaining territories after the Greek War of Independence, well into the 20th century, including the enslavement of Christian women during the Greek genocide.
