= Aina Rado =

Spanish politician (1947–2017)

Member of the Parliament of the Balearic Islands for Mallorca
- In office 21 September 2004 – 7 June 2011
- Preceded by: Joana Maria Seguí i Pons

President of the Parliament of the Balearic Islands
- In office 9 March 2010 – 7 June 2011

Member of the Mallorca Insular Council
- In office 1999–2006

Secretary-General of the Federation of Education Workers
- In office 1987–1995

Personal details
- Born: 9 August 1947 (age 79) Santanyí, Mallorca, Spain
- Died: 25 April 2017 (aged 69)
- Party: Spanish Socialist Workers' Party
- Other political affiliations: Communist Party of Spain (formerly)
- Occupation: Politician; teacher

Aina Sebastiana Rado i Ferrando (9 August 1947 - 25 April 2017) was a Spanish Socialist Workers' Party politician who served as a deputy in the Parliament of the Balearic Islands for Mallorca from 2004 until 2011, as well as their president from 2010 until 2011. Prior to her election, she was a councillor on the Mallorca Insular Council from 1999 until 2006 and secretary-general of the Federation of Education Workers from 1987 until 1995.

== Biography ==
Aina Sebastiana Rado i Ferrando was born on 9 August 1947 in Santanyí, and she worked as a teacher outside of politics. A former member of the Communist Party of Spain, she later moved to the Federation of Education Workers (FETE-UGT), becoming their secretary-general from 1987 until 1995 and later the secretary of social action for their state-level branch (1995-1998).

Rado was a councillor on the Mallorca Insular Council (1999-2006), as well as general director for minors of the Government of the Balearic Islands (1999-2003). She joined the Spanish Socialist Workers' Party (PSOE) in 1998, and was secretary of equality of the party's Mallorca federation between 2000 and 2004.

Rado succeeded Joana Maria Seguí i Pons as a deputy of the Parliament of the Balearic Islands for Mallorca on 21 September 2004. She was re-elected to the same constituency in the 2007 election, and she served until 7 June 2011. she also became vice-president of that parliament. She became president of the Parliament on 9 March 2010, replacing Maria Antònia Munar, and she stood down from the vice-presidency; she was the second woman elected to the position, after Munar herself.

Rado died on 25 April 2017, aged 70.
