= Walloon =

Walloon may refer to:

- Walloons, a French-speaking population of Belgium
- Walloon language
- Walloon Region or Wallonia in Belgium
  - Walloon Government
- Walloon Lake
- Walloon, Queensland

== See also ==
- The Walloons, a 1782 play by Richard Cumberland
- Walloon sword
- Wallon (disambiguation)
- Walon Sport, a Peruvian sportswear company
