= Paul Delanoue =

French trade unionist (1908–1983)

Paul Louis Adrien Delanoue (1 June 1908 – 20 March 1983) was a French trade union leader.

Born in Sonzay, Delanoue's father was killed during World War I. He trained as a teacher, qualifying in 1926, and initially working in Château-Renault. He joined the Communist Party of France (PCF), and also the Unitary Federation of Education. He founded a local branch of the union in Indre-et-Loire, becoming its secretary.

Delanoue became increasingly prominent in the union, serving as joint secretary of its group on educational youth groups and teacher training, and secretary of the education branch of the Federal Union of Students. He also held regional positions in the PCF.

Delanoue was frequently subject to sanctions relating to his politics, making it difficult for him to teach. In his spare time, he studied mathematics, and then electrical engineering. In 1940, he was arrested for working on behalf of the banned PCF, but escaped, and continued his activities underground. During this period, he supported himself by working testing televisions in Paris. He wrote widely for communist resistance publications.

In 1944, the General Confederation of Labour (CGT) was relaunched, and Delanoue became the editor of its journal, La Vie Ouvrière. He also remained involved with the Federation for National Education, and led a campaign for secular education. Following disputes in the CGT, the education union opted to become independent. Delanoue strongly disagreed with this, and remained involved with the CGT.

In 1949, Delanoue was elected as the first general secretary of the World Federation of Teachers' Unions (FISE). In this role, he focused on developing trade unionism among teachers in Africa and Latin America. He stood down in 1961, and returned to teaching mathematics in Paris, until his retirement in 1966. In 1964, he was appointed as president of FISE, then in 1974, he became honorary president.

Delanoue remained active in the PCF, but in 1980, he signed a letter calling for the withdrawal of Soviet troops from Afghanistan, disagreeing with party's leadership.

Trade union offices
Preceded by New position	General Secretary of the World Federation of Teachers' Unions; 1949–1961	Succeeded by Angel Pizarro
Preceded by Henri Wallon	President of the World Federation of Teachers' Unions; 1964–1974	Succeeded by Lesturuge Ariyawansa
