= Union of Education and Training =

East German trade union

The Union of Education and Training (German: Gewerkschaft Unterricht und Erziehung, Gew. UuE) was a trade union representing education workers in East Germany.

The union was founded in 1946, and was a founding affiliate of the Free German Trade Union Federation (FDGB), by which point it had 44,392 members. Internationally, it affiliated to the World Federation of Teachers' Unions.

The union grew steadily, reaching 280,000 members by 1964, and 574,913 by 1989. In February 1990, it became independent, and it dissolved in October. Its members then decided whether to join the Education and Science Workers' Union or the Public Services, Transport and Traffic Union, both of which had established branches in East Germany.

== Presidents ==
1946: Richard Schallock
1949: Karl Ellrich
1954: Erika Wendland (acting)
1955: Alfred Wilke
1964: Paul Ruhig
1985: Helga Labs
1990: Friedhelm Busse
