= Zygostates (Byzantine official) =

The zygostates (Greek: ζυγοστάτης, "one who weighs with a balance"; plural: ζυγοστάται, zygostatai) was a public weigher of the coinage of the Byzantine Empire. According to the Lex Julia, he was a municipal official whose function was to verify the quality of the gold solidus coins.

== Description ==
The term zygostates often appears in inscriptions and papyri of the late Roman Empire in the form of zygostates tes poleos (Greek: ζυγοστάτης τῆς πόλεως, "public weigher of the city"). It has its origin in the demosioi, or state slaves, of ancient Greece who were employed in the mint or as other treasury functionaries, and the term demosioi zygostatai is attested in several works.

The Byzantine emperor Justinian I (r. 527–565) regarded the zygostatai, in his 11th Edict, as the main offenders in changing the purity of gold coins. Some imperial seals bearing the name of zygostatai are preserved from the 6th and 7th centuries AD. In the Taktika of the 9th and 10th centuries AD, the zygostates is a state, rather than urban, functionary belonging to the staff of the sakellion. The epithet "imperial" is granted to the zygostates on a Byzantine seal dating to the 7th century AD. Based on this evidence, John Bagnell Bury surmised that in the 7th century the zygostates began to examine and weigh coins that came to the Byzantine imperial treasury. The Byzantine Greek monk and abbot, Theodore the Studite, described the zygostasia, or the imperial station where the zygostatai worked, as a profitable business. As for Christopher of Mytilene, he praised a zygostates named Eustathios as the founder of a church and "one of the great chartoularioi".

The term zygastikon (Greek: ζυγαστικόν), attested in a false privilege granted to the city of Monemvasia in 1316, refers to one of the customary payments made to toll inspectors for measuring and weighing wares. On a functional level, the zygastikon had nothing in common with the zygostates of the sakellion.

== Sources ==
- Kazhdan, Alexander, ed. (1991). The Oxford Dictionary of Byzantium. Oxford and New York: Oxford University Press. ISBN 0-19-504652-8.
- Laiou, Angeliki E., ed. (2002). The Economic History of Byzantium from the Seventh through the Fifteenth Century. Washington, District of Columbia: Dumbarton Oaks. ISBN 0-88402-288-9. Archived from the original on 2012-02-18.
