= Paul Diel =

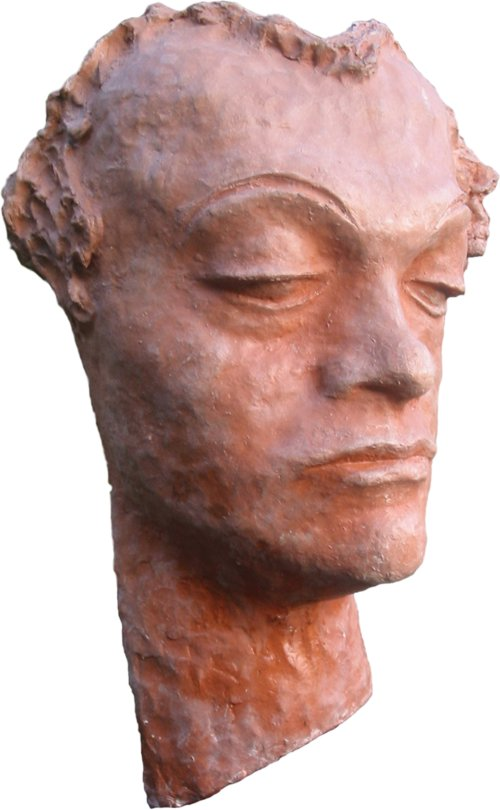
Bust of Paul Diel, by Jane Diel

Paul Diel (11 July 1893 – 5 January 1972) was a French psychologist of Austrian origin who developed the method of introspective analysis and the psychology of motivation.

== Life ==
Cover art for Symbolism in Greek Mythology first French edition

Diel was born in Vienna, Austria, on 11 July 1893, to a teacher of German origin and an unknown man. He was orphaned at the age of 13 after spending 8 years in a religious orphanage, but was able to obtain his baccalauréat with the support of a benefactor. Diel did not pursue formal higher education, but instead became an actor, novelist, and poet before teaching himself philosophy. Inspired by the philosophers Plato, Kant and Spinoza, and also by the psychologists Freud, Adler and Jung, he delved into his own psychological research and established the basis of the introspective analysis method that helped him develop his theories of the psychology of motivation.

Diel practiced psychotherapy at the central hospital of Vienna, and in 1935 he sent his work on introspective analysis to Albert Einstein. Einstein greatly appreciated Diel's work and they established a correspondence that did not end until Einstein's death in 1955.

In 1938, after the Nazi German Anschluss of Austria, Diel escaped to France and worked at the Sainte-Anne psychiatric hospital in Paris. Unfortunately, because he was a foreign national, he became imprisoned in the Gurs internment camp in southern France during World War II. After his release, he was able to join CNRS in 1945 with the backing of Einstein and Irène Joliot-Curie. At CNRS he worked as a children's psychotherapist in Henri Wallon's laboratory.

Diel continued working as a researcher and psychotherapist and had trained a group of students and published books on various subjects like education, symbolism and evolution when he died of cancer in Paris on 5 January 1972.
