= René Zazzo =

French psychologist and pedagogue

René Zazzo (27 October 1910 – 20 September 1995) was a French psychologist and pedagogue.

Zazzo's research focused on child psychology. He was one of the first people to study a group of problems relating to dyslexia and disability. Considering the development of children considered to be weak, Zazzo proposed the concept of "oligophrenic heterochrony" in order to show that this development, compared with that of normal children, occurred at various speeds, according to the particular psychobiological sector concerned. The majority of research which Zazzo produced between 1950 and 1980 centered on what he regarded as "the principal problem of psychology"—that of the identity: how does a person's psyche build itself? The fields in which he worked were various attempts to bring answers to this question.

== Biography ==
Zazzo was born in Paris into a modest family. After obtaining a Doctorate of Letters in the Sorbonne (1933-1933), on the advice of Meyerson and of Henri Wallon, he obtained a grant to study in the laboratory of Gesell at Yale University, where he specialized in child psychology.

On his return to France, Zazzo began working for the CNRS and integrated the laboratory of Child Psychobiology and the Practical School of the Higher Studies. When the Germans invaded Paris during World War II, he directed the laboratory of psychopathology of the Henri Rousselle Hospital. He published his first book during the War, which was devoted to a study of the pioneers of American psychology (1942), before entering the French Resistance.

In 1945, Zazzo was asked to found the first programs of school psychology. Zazzo wished to aid children who were not succeeding in school, as opposed to detecting children with psychological problems.

In 1950, Zazzo taught at the same time at the Institute of Psychology, the National Institute for the Vocational guidance, and the laboratory of EPHE, where he succeeded Wallon, before becoming president of the French Company of Psychology in 1955 and in 1977.

In 1967 he occupied the presidency of the Société Française de Psychologie, and in 1968 he was appointed president of the Groupement Français d'Études de Neuro-Psychopathologie Infantile.

== Works ==
- Psychologues et Psychologies d'Amérique (1942)
- Le Devenir de l'Intelligence (1946)
- Intelligence et Quotients d'âges (1946)
- Les Jumeaux, le Couple et la Personne (in two volumes, 1960)
- Conduites et Conscience (in two volumes, 1962, 1968)
- Nouvelle Echelle métrique de l'Intelligence (in two volumes in collaboration with other authors, 1966)
- Des Garçons de 6 à 12 ans (in collaboration, 1969)
- Les Débilités Mentales (in collaboration, 1969)
