= Federation of Education Workers =

Trade union of Italy

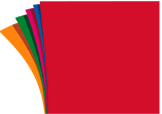
Logo of the union

The Federation of Education Workers (Italian: Federazione Lavoratori della Conoscenza, FLC) is a trade union representing educators and researchers in Italy.

In 1996, the Italian General Confederation of Labour (CGIL) founded the Second Level Federation (School - University - Research - Training), which loosely grouped together the National Union of University and Research, and the National School Union. In 2004, the two unions merged, forming the Federation of Education Workers, which also affiliated to CGIL. By 2017, the union had 211,769 members.

== General Secretaries ==
2004: Enrico Panini
2008: Domenico Pantaleo
2017: Francesco Sinopoli
