= Scythian archers =

Supposed police force of Classical Athens

Scythian archers Speusinioi Σπευσίνιοι
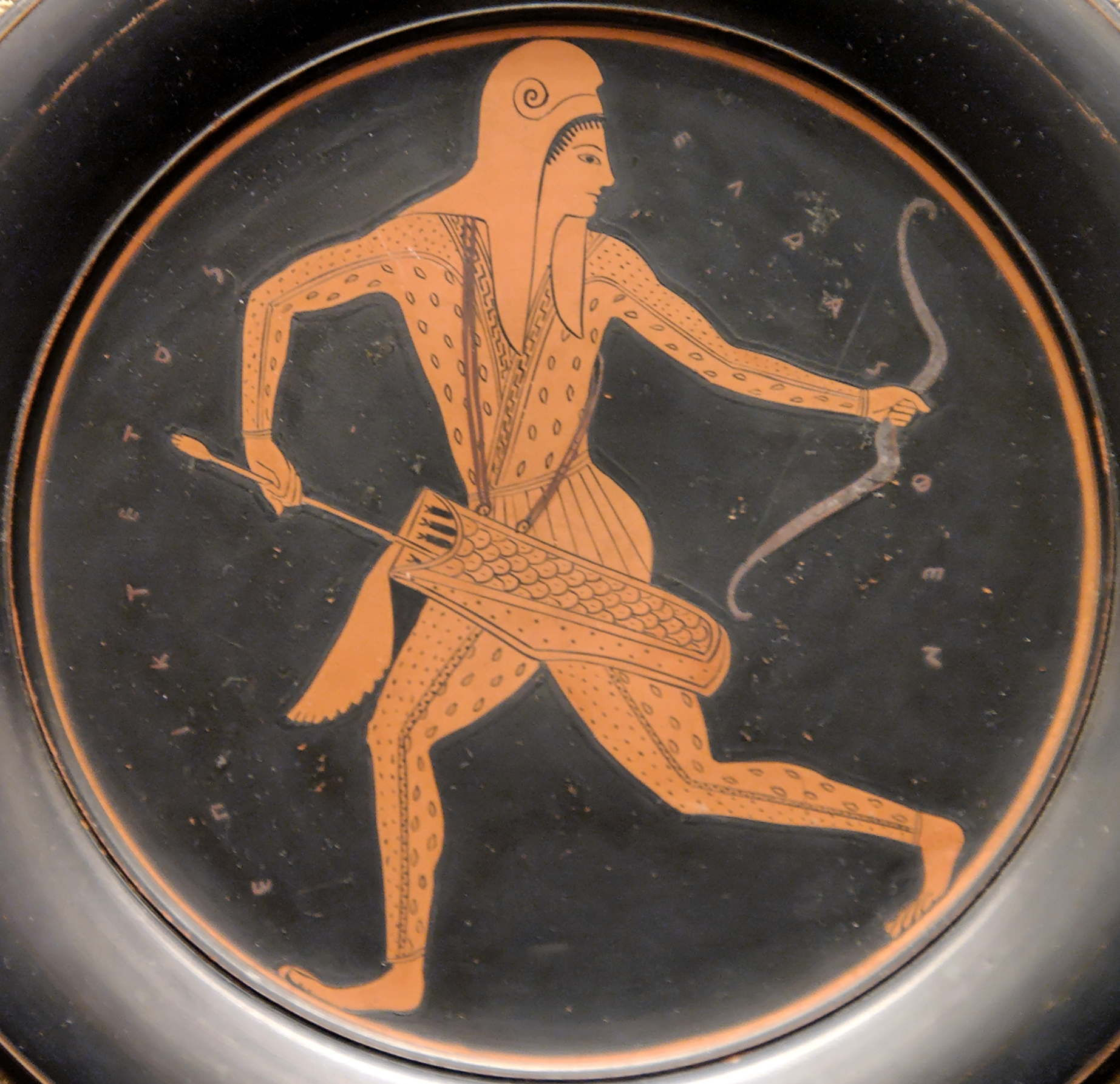
- An Attic red-figure vase-painting of a Scythian archer by Epiktetos, 520–500 BC

Agency overview
- Formed: 5th century BC
- Dissolved: 4th century BC
- Employees: 300–1,200
- Legal personality: Government agency

Jurisdictional structure
- National agency: Classical Athens
- Operations jurisdiction: Classical Athens
- General nature: Local civilian police

Operational structure
- Headquarters: Tents or wooden barracks in the Agora and later on the Areopagus
- Elected officer responsible: The Eleven

Notables
- Person: Speusinos, for allegedly establishing the force

The Scythian archers were a hypothesized police force of 5th- and early 4th-century BC Athens that is recorded in some Greek artworks and literature. The force is said to have consisted of 300 armed Scythians (a nomadic Iranic people living in the Eurasian Steppe) who were public slaves in Athens. They acted on behalf of a group of eleven elected Athenian magistrates "who were responsible for arrests and executions and for some aspects of public order" in the city. Despite being called "archers", the Scythian police probably did not use bows and arrows.

One of Aristophanes's comedies has a Scythian archer as a character, and he speaks broken Greek with an accent.

== Name ==
The Scythian archers were called toxotai (τοξόται, literally "[the] archers"), Skythai (Σκύθαι, literally "[the] Scythians"), and Speusinioi (Σπευσίνιοι), which was named after a certain Speusinos, the alleged founder of the force.

== Theory ==
The theory regarding the "police force" role of the Scythian archers in 5th- and early 4th-century BC Athens is mainly based on some possible evidence from Attic vase paintings and the works of the ancient Athenian playwright Aristophanes. The force is said to have consisted of 300 public slaves (demosioi), who wore Scythian dress and were equipped with bows and arrows in gorytos (the Scythian people were skilled archers). As portrayed on Attic vase paintings, the Scythian archers were distinguished by high pointed headdresses and wide trousers. They were said to have been used to maintain order in the Assembly and the council, though they had little authority themselves. They acted for the Eleven (οἱ ἕνδεκα), a group of eleven elected magistrates in Athens, "who were responsible for arrests and executions and for some aspects of public order".

== Analysis ==
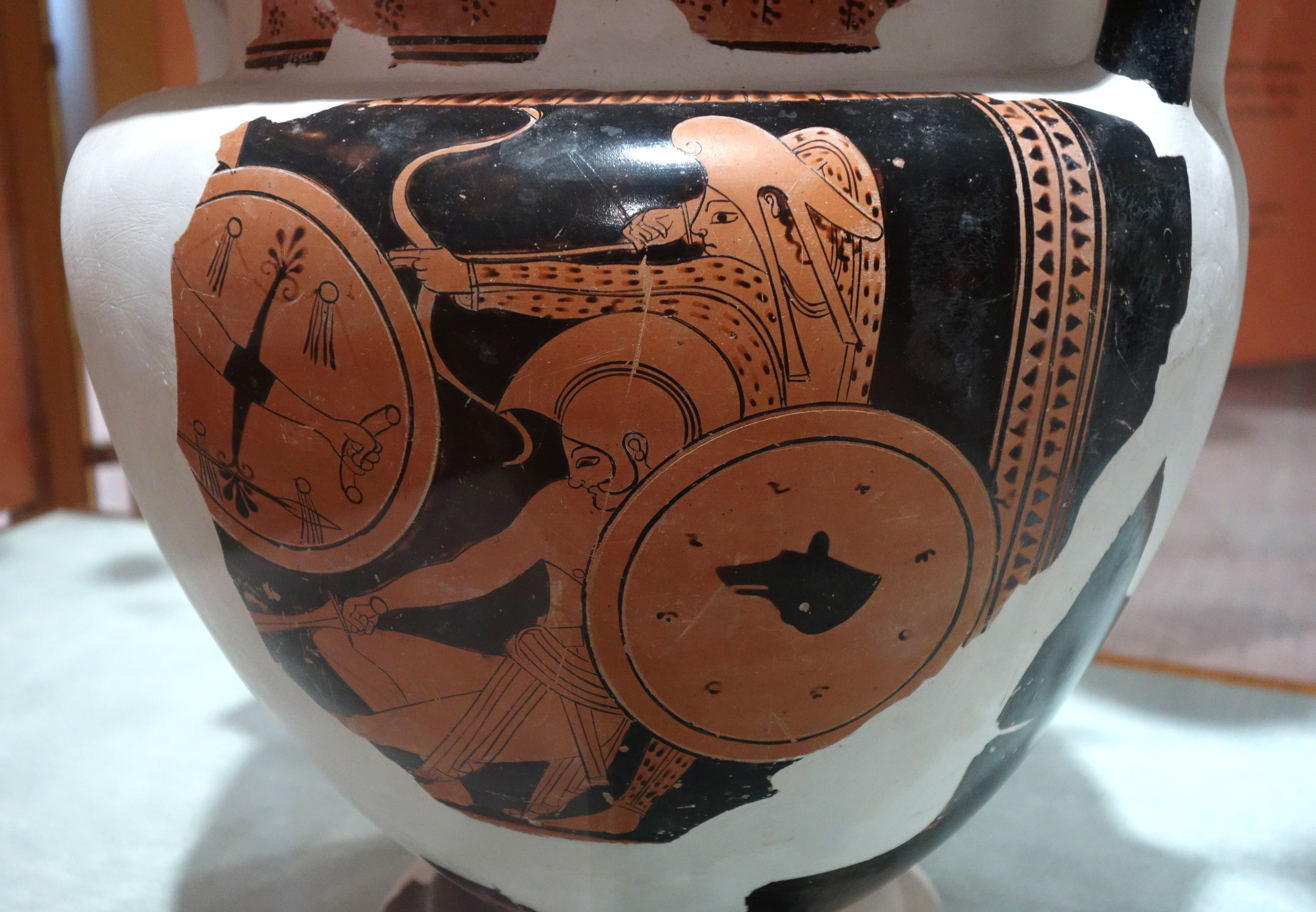
Attic painting of a Scythian archer fighting alongside a hoplite. First quarter of the 5th century BCE.

Scholars agree that a Scythian police force of some sort existed in Athens in the 5th century, although no one knows when it was first established or how long it lasted. The evidence for Scythian archers as early as the 6th century BC is inconclusive. The Scythian archers that appear to be attending to the hoplites on the Attic vase paintings of the 6th century BC are not necessarily related to the Scythian "police force" of the 5th century BC. The police force, the number of which is said to have swelled to 1,200 at some point, may have been involved in wartime conflicts as well. Balbina Bäbler points to archeological evidence for Scythians in the 4th century, including the stele of Getes, buried Scythian arrowheads, and other Greek-style grave stelae. It is impossible to know whether these Scythians represent a continuation of the police force known earlier or whether Scythian women also lived in Athens.

Scholars are unsure why Athenians would employ "barbarians", although it's possible that foreign slaves far from home would compose a more faithful police force than locals would. It is also not clear why bows and arrows were appropriate weapons for the cramped city of Athens.

In the comedy works of Aristophanes, the dialects of various Greek people are imitated. In his Thesmophoriazusae, the Scythian archer speaks broken Greek, consistently omitting the final -s (-ς) and -n (ν), using the lenis in place of the aspirate, and once using x (ξ) in place of s (σ). These have been noted by John William Donaldson to discuss the largely unknown Scythian languages.

=== Equipment ===
Despite their name and the presence of archers in Athenian art, researchers have questioned whether the Scythian police would have actually used bows and arrows. Archery expert Mike Loades argued that the Athenian vase paintings do not depict realistic Scythian composite bows, quivers, and clothing, especially compared to those known from original Scythian art. Accordingly, he has described the vase paintings as "fantasy 'dress-up'" by artists who wanted to depict the Scythians as exotic, but had probably never seen a Scythian bow beforehand. In this case, the term "archers" for the Athenian police force would be a byword for the police's ethnic composition, not its actual equipment. To support this view, Loades points out that all ancient literary references to the "Scythian archers" describe them as beating up people, and never as them using bows. Archaeological evidence also points at the Scythian police having used horse-whips with wooden handles on duty, similar to those used by some modern police units.

== See also ==
- Mamluks
- Peloponnesian War
