= All Bengal Primary Teachers Association =

- নিখিলবঙ্গ প্রাথমিক শিক্ষক সমিতি
- Abbreviation: ABPTA
- Formation: 9 February 1935 (91 years ago), Sirajganj, Bengal Presidency, British India
- Headquarters: 89, M.G. Road, Barabazar, Kolkata-700007
- Region served: West Bengal
- Members: ▲1.2 lakh (approx.)
- General Secretary: Dhrubasekhar Mandal
- President: Mohan Das Pandit
- Affiliations: School Teachers' Federation of India

The All Bengal Primary Teachers Association (ABPTA) is the oldest primary teachers' organization in India, founded in 1935.

== History ==
The All Bengal Primary School Teachers Association was established on 9-10 February 1935, at Sirajganj Intermediate College. The founding conference elected S. Wazed Ali as president and Maulvi Ahmed Hossain as general secretary.

The second conference of the association was held on 7-8 August 1937, at Albert Hall and Rammohan Library in Kolkata. During this conference, the association changed its name to the All Bengal Primary Teachers Association, removing the word "School." The conference was presided over by Sir Acharya Prafulla Chandra Roy. The leadership remained unchanged, and the association was officially registered under the Society Registration Act.

In 1938, the third conference took place on 3–4 September in Kolkata. The conference was inaugurated by Bengal's Prime Minister, A.K. Fazlul Huq, and presided over by Justice Charu Chandra Biswas. During this conference, Professor Mohitosh Ray Chaudhuri was elected president, and Radhika Prasad Bandyopadhyay became the general secretary.

The fourth conference was held in December 1940 in Rajshahi. There were no changes in the positions of president and general secretary. Due to the impact of World War II and the Bengal famine of 1943, subsequent conferences were delayed. The fifth conference was eventually held on 2-3 November 1945, at the Calcutta University auditorium. The leadership remained unchanged. In 1946 and 1947, Professor Mohitosh Ray Chaudhuri remained president for both the sixth and seventh conferences.

Following the partition of Bengal in 1947, the association in East Pakistan (now Bangladesh) reformed as East Pakistan Primary Teachers' Association, while the association in West Bengal continued to operate under the same All Bengal Primary Teachers Association.

The 46th State Conference, held from 23-25 August 2019, in Mathurapur elected Mohan Das Pandit as General Secretary and Debashis Dutta as President. The 47th Conference, on 10-11 September 2022, in Kalna elected Dhruva Shekhar Mondal as General Secretary and elected Mohandas Pandit as President. They currently lead the organization.

With over 120,000 members, stands as the largest primary teachers' organization in the country.

== See also ==
- All Bengal Teachers Association
- Students' Federation of India
- All India Students Federation
