= National School Union =

Trade union of Italy

The National School Union (Italian: Sindacato Nazionale Scuola, SNS) was a trade union representing workers in schools in Italy.

The union was founded on 16 December 1967, at a conference in Ariccia. It affiliated to the Italian General Confederation of Labour (CGIL), and by 1985 it had 137,254 members, but this figure began falling, and by 1998 was down to 98,834. In 1996, it became part of the Second Level Federation (School - University - Research - Training) section of CGIL, along with the National Union of University and Research. In 2004, the two unions merged, forming the Federation of Education Workers.

== General Secretaries ==
1967: R. Sciorilli Borelli
1969: Aldo Bondioli
1970: Eugenio Capitani
1974: Bruno Roscani
1980: Claudio Pedrini
1983: Gianfranco Benzi
1989: Dario Missaglia
1993: Emanuele Barbieri
1997: Enrico Panini
