= Henri Wallon (psychologist) =

French psychologist, philosopher, pedagogist, and politician

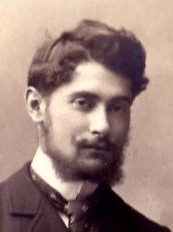
- Born: Henri Paul Hyacinthe Wallon; 15 March 1879; Paris, France
- Died: 1 December 1962 (aged 83); Paris, France
- Education: École normale supérieure
- Scientific career
- Fields: Psychology, social psychology, philosophy, psychiatry

Henri Paul Hyacinthe Wallon (March 15, 1879 – December 1, 1962) was a French philosopher, psychologist (in the field of social psychology), neuropsychiatrist, teacher, and politician. He was the grandson of the historian and statesman Henri-Alexandre Wallon.

== Career ==
Henri Wallon conducted two parallel careers. As a convinced Marxist, he took up political duties while carrying out scientific work in the field of developmental psychology.

=== Politics ===
In 1931, Wallon joined the French socialist political party SFIO and became a member of the French Communist Party in 1942. In 1944 he was named Secretary of National Education. He was elected Communist Deputy (1945-1946) and chaired an education reform commission that durably marked the National Education system under the name "The Langevin-Wallon Project" (1945).

=== Psychology ===
Henri Wallon is better known by his scientific work primarily devoted to child development. Following his education, he occupied the highest positions in the French university world where he fostered leading research activity.

Wallon was admitted to the École Normale Supérieure in 1899, where he passed higher-level competitive examinations for teachers and professors (agrégation) in philosophy in 1902. In 1908 he became a doctor of medicine, and from 1908 to 1931 worked with intellectually disabled children.

During World War I, Wallon was mobilized as an army medical officer and became interested in neurology. In 1920 he became a junior lecturer at the Sorbonne, and then in 1925 attained his Ph.D. (Docteur ès lettres) with a thesis on "the turbulent child". He was named director of studies at the École Pratique des Hautes Études in 1927 and created the Laboratory of Pediatric Psychobiology (laboratoire de psycho-biologie de l'enfant) at CNRS, where Paul Diel came under his direction upon joining the laboratory in 1945. From 1937 to 1949 he was a professor with the Collège de France (as chair of the department of Childhood Psychology and Education). In 1948, as director of the University of Paris's Institute of Psychology, he created the journal Enfance. He was a president of the Groupe français d'éducation nouvelle from 1946 until his death in 1962.

== Theoretical positions ==
Henri Wallon organized his observations by presenting the development of the child's personality as a succession of stages. Some of these stages are marked by the predominance of affectivity over intelligence whereas others appear characterized instead by the primacy of intelligence over affectivity. The child's personality is developed in this discontinuous and competitive succession between the prevalence of intelligence and affectivity. Thus, Wallon articulated at the core of a dialectical model of concepts such as emotion, attitudes, and interpersonal bonds. His conception of the stages implied the idea that regression was possible, contrary to Piaget's model.

=== The principal stages ===
1. The impulsive and emotional stages (0 to 12 months). Dominating infantile life, they are the internal feelings (introceptives) and the affective factors fostered with the surroundings. On the motor plane this period is characterized by weak motor control and thus gestural disorder. The quality responses from the infant's surroundings will enable him to pass from the gestural disorder to differentiated emotions.
2. The sensorimotor and projective stage (1 to 3 years). What prevails then for the child is the influence of the external world. The integration of this external influence will support the awakening of two types of intelligence: one practical (through the handling of objects and child's own body), the other the discursive through imitation and appropriation of language.
3. The personalism stage (3 to 6 years) is characterized by a predominance, once again, of affective functions over intelligence. Around 3 years of age the child tends to be opposed to the adult in a kind of negativist crisis, but this attitude is soon followed by a period of motor and social imitation. The child expresses thus the ambivalence binding him to the prestigious model that the adult represents for him.
4. The categorial stage (6 to 11 years). Here, intellectual faculties seem to take the lead over the affective one. During his schooling the child acquires capacities for voluntary memory and attention. His intelligence approaches the formation of mental categories, which lead to the capacities for abstraction.
5. The adolescence stage begins after 11 years and is characterized by a primacy of the affective concerns.

Émile Jalley showed how Henri Wallon was an attentive reader of the German scientific and philosophical literature and how he contributed to the introduction and diffusion of certain concepts of Hegel and Freud into French psychological theory.

While insisting on discontinuity and the concept of crisis underlying this discontinuity, Henri Wallon demonstrated his fidelity to the Hegelian theses of the dialectic. In this regard, Wallon differed from Jean Piaget, who in his own description of the stages of infantile development instead valorized interactions to the detriment of discontinuity.

Henri Wallon had a marked influence on psychoanalysis equally in France and abroad. Émile Jalley showed that he had revisited certain of Freud's observations or concepts in his theoretical developments. In turn, certain psychoanalysts adapted his observations, in particular René Spitz, Donald Winnicott, and Jacques Lacan, the latter of whom highlighted the focus on "social relativity in...Wallon's remarkable work". Lacan went on to borrow and adapt the concept of the mirror stage from Wallon, who saw the child's self-recognition in the mirror around six-eight months as a key to the transition from the specular to the imaginary and the symbolic concept of the ego/I - both the Imaginary and the Symbolic providing further borrowings for Lacan.

== See also ==
- Theory of cognitive development

== Bibliography ==
=== Henri Wallon's Works ===
- Délire de persécution. Le délire chronique à base d'interprétation, Baillière, Paris, 1909, reissued L'Harmattan, 2015
- « La conscience et la vie subconsciente » in G. Dumas, Nouveau traité de psychologie, PUF, Paris (1920-1921)
- L'enfant turbulent, 2 vol., Alcan, Paris, 1925, reissued PUF, Paris 1984 (the first volume)
- Les origines du caractère chez l'enfant. Les préludes du sentiment de personnalité, Boisvin, Paris, 1934, reissued PUF, Paris, 1973, 2015
- La vie mentale, Éditions sociales, Paris, 1938, reissued 1982 (intro by Émile Jallley)
- L'évolution psychologique de l'enfant, A. Colin, Paris, 1941, reissued 1974, 2012 (intro by Émile Jalley)
- De l'acte à la pensée, Flammarion, Paris, 1942
- Les origines de la pensée chez l'enfant, PUF, Paris, 1945, reissued 1963, 2015
- Psychologie et dialectique. La Spirale et le miroir (textes écrits de 1926 à 1961), Messidor, 1990 (presented by Émile Jalley and Liliane Maury)
- Œuvres d'Henri Wallon, 6 tomes, L'Harmattan, 2015. (led by Émile Jalley and Philippe Wallon)
  - Œuvres 1, délire de persécution, psychologie pathologique.
  - Œuvres 2, 1903-1929.
  - Œuvres 3, 1930-1937.
  - Œuvres 4, 1938-1950.
  - Œuvres 5, 1951-1956.
  - Œuvres 6, 1957-1963.

=== Studies on Henri Wallon ===
- René Zazzo, Psychologie et marxisme; la vie et l’œuvre d’Henri Wallon. Paris, Denoël Gonthier, 1975.
- Émile Jalley, Wallon lecteur de Freud et Piaget. Trois études suivies des textes de Wallon sur la psychanalyse, Éd. sociales, Paris, 1981
- Émile Jalley, Freud, Wallon, Lacan. L'enfant au miroir, éd. EPEL, Paris, 1998
- Émile Jalley, Wallon et Piaget : pour une critique de la psychologie contemporaine, Paris, L'Harmattan, coll. « Questions contemporaines », 2006 (notice BnF no FRBNF40244780).

Trade union offices
Preceded by New position	President of the World Federation of Teachers' Unions; 1949–1962	Succeeded by Paul Delanoue
