= Demosioi =

Class of public slaves in ancient Greece

Demosioi or Demosii (Ancient Greek: δημόσιοι, singular Demosios) generally referred to a class of public slaves in the system of slavery in ancient Greece at Athens, who were bought and owned by the state itself. They may in some cases have been privately owned slaves leased to the state. Their legal status in the Athenian state was complicated.

Demosios was a word that meant "public" or "of the state", but when used in the plural generally referred to this social class of public slaves. However the word had other applications. Some priesthoods were referred to as demosioi, presumably not because they were slaves, but on account of some state relationship. The word could also be used -- as in the phrase demosioi aethloi -- to refer to the various athletic games sponsored by the state.

== Classes of demosioi ==
Scholar S. Waszynski proposed the demosioi were divided into three classes:

- scythai, who formed a sort of police force
- ergatai, common workers who toiled at forced labour
- hyperetai, held positions of trust as assistants to the officials and governments of the state, or who were skilled in some exceptional way

Scythai, ergatai, and some lower classes of hyperetai were compensated at subsistence levels and lived in barracks provided by the state, while some higher classes of hyperetai appear to have made a competitive daily wage and were accorded some measure of independence unusual for a slave.

== Functions of demosioi ==
Demosioi held several different roles in public life, and performed a number of tasks useful to the state. There was apparently a "standard" punishment for demosioi who had committed some infraction or failed in their duties in some way, of fifty lashes.

=== Policing ===
The most numerous class of Demosioi were the toxotai (τοξόται) or scythai (Σκύθαι), a force of police armed with bows and also called Speusinioi (Σπευσίνιοι) from the first organizer of the service, who served under officers called toxarchoi (τόξαρχοι).

Their duty was to preserve order in the assembly, courts, public places, and public works. They were at first encamped in tents in the agora, and afterwards removed to the Areopagus. Certain of them were in personal attendance on officials, for example the Prytaneis, Probuli--especially police-officers: Astynomi, Agoranomi The corps dated from the year of the Battle of Salamis, that is, 480 BCE, when 300 were bought; they were later increased to 1200.

=== Court functionaries ===
Executioners and torturers and similar roles, whether police or not, were also slaves. Demosioi were also employed in subordinate places in the assembly and courts, as checking-clerks (antigrapheis, or ἀντιγραφεῖς); their amenability to torture making them especially serviceable for such duties. The state undertook their training.

=== Treasury functionaries ===
Demosioi served as slave workmen in the treasury and mint, and in the mines. Exceptional demosioi were also at times singled out and put in charge of things like weights and measures for a municipality. This role persisted until very late in the history of the Roman Empire, as demosioi zygostatai.

=== Healthcare ===
Demosioi iatroi, or "public slave doctors", are attested in several texts of Roman Egypt. These were elected or hired or (if they were indeed slaves) bought by the state, to secure the permanent presence of medical professionals in their city. These appear to have possessed honors or privileges that seem to distinguish them from slaves, which leads some historians to suppose demosioi weren't slaves after all. These may have been of the upper class of hyperetai that were accorded a measure of independence and freedom. They may also have fulfilled a role more like public health officer, medical examiner, or coroner, than that of a physician. This role of demosioi appears to be absent in the Greek state.

=== Socially unacceptable tasks ===
Demosioi were also put to work doing tasks that were considered unsuitable to free citizens. At Arginusae, demosioi rowed in the galleys. Elsewhere, they worked in waste disposal, removal of the dead, the upkeep of public roads and waterways, among other tasks.

== Debate ==
Some historians, such as Luciano Canfora and Gérard Walter, have suggested the demosioi were not in fact slaves but instead were a kind of public appointment, and the belief they were slaves comes about from mistranslation and misunderstanding of the scant texts we have that discuss demosioi. Other historians suggest that only some of the demosioi were slaves, and others were public appointments.

While some historians demur, "public slaves" remains the dominant translation of the term in modern texts.
