= Henri-Alexandre Wallon =

French historian and statesman (1812–1904)

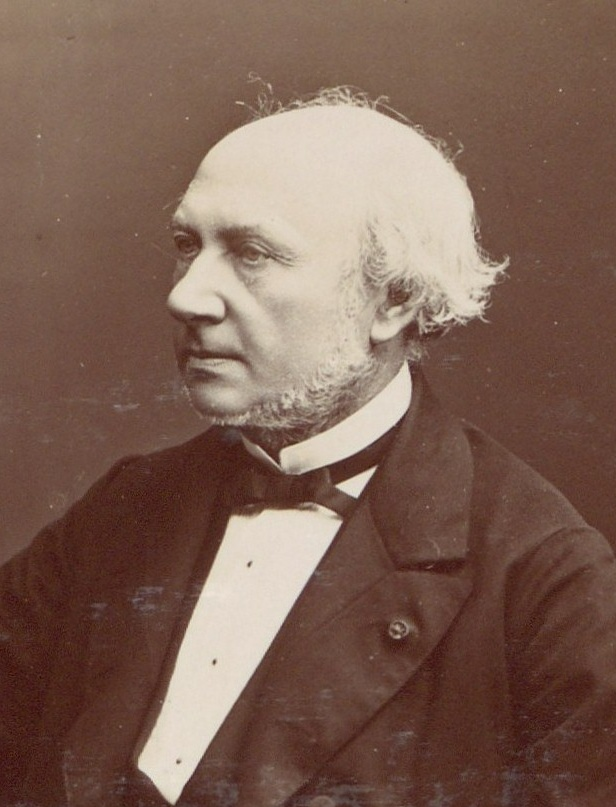
portrait of Henri Wallon

Henri-Alexandre Wallon (23 December 1812 – 13 November 1904) was a French historian and statesman whose decisive contribution to the creation of the Third Republic led him to be called the "Father of the Republic". He was the grandfather of psychologist and politician Henri Wallon.

== Early life ==
Wallon was born at Valenciennes (Nord) on 23 December 1812.

== Career ==
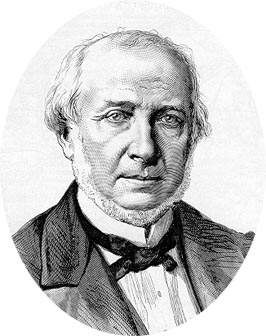
Henri-Alexandre Wallon

Devoting himself to a literary career, in 1840 he became professor at the École Normale Supérieure under the patronage of Guizot, whom he succeeded as professor at the Faculté des Lettres in 1846. His works on slavery in the French colonies (1847) and on slavery in antiquity (1848; new edition in 3 vols., 1879) led to his being placed, after the Revolution of 1848, on a commission for the regulation of labour in the French colonial possessions, and in November 1849 he was elected to the Legislative Assembly by the department of the Nord. He resigned in 1850, disapproving of the measure for the restriction of the suffrage adopted by the majority. In the same year he was elected a member of the Académie des Inscriptions, of which he became perpetual secretary in 1873.

Under the empire he withdrew altogether from political life, and occupied himself entirely with his duties as a professor of history and with historical writings, the most original of which is a biography, Richard II, épisode de la rivalité de la France et de l'Angleterre (2 vols., 1864). Although remaining a republican, he exhibited decided clerical leanings in his Jeanne d'Arc (2 vols., 1860; 2nd ed., 1875); La Vie de Notre Seigneur Jésus (1865) – a reply to the Vie de Jésus of E. Renan; and Saint Louis et son temps (1871; 4th ed., 1892).

Returning to politics after the Franco-Prussian War, Wallon was re-elected by the department of the Nord in 1871, took an active part in the proceedings of the Assembly, and finally immortalized himself by carrying his proposition for the establishment of the Republic with a president elected for seven years, and then eligible for re-election, which, after violent debates, was adopted by the Assembly on 30 January 1875. "Ma proposition," he declared, "ne proclame pas la République, elle la fait." Upon the definitive establishment of the Republic, Wallon became Minister of Public Instruction, and effected many useful reforms, but his views were too conservative for the majority of the Assembly, and he retired in May 1876. He had been chosen a life senator in December 1875.

Returning to his historical studies, Wallon produced four works of great importance, though less from his part in them as author than from the documents which accompanied them:

- La Terreur (1873)
- Histoire du tribunal révolutionnaire de Paris avec le journal de ses actes (6 vols., 1880–1882)
- La Révolution du 31 mai et le fédéralisme en 1793 (2 vols., 1886)
- Les Représentants du peuple en mission et la justice révolutionnaire dans les départements (5 vols., 1880–1890).

Besides these he published a number of articles in the Journal des savants; for many years he wrote the history of the Académie des Inscriptions in the collection of Memoirs of this academy, and he composed obituary notices of his colleagues, which were inserted in the Bulletin.

== Death ==
On his death on 13 November 1904, Henri Wallon was interred in the Cimetière du Montparnasse in Paris.

== See also ==
- Henri Wallon (psychologist), Henri-Alexandre Wallon's grandson
