= 2025 Italian referendum =

Abrogative referendums on labor protections and citizenship legislation

2025 Italian abrogative referendums
- 8–9 June 2025
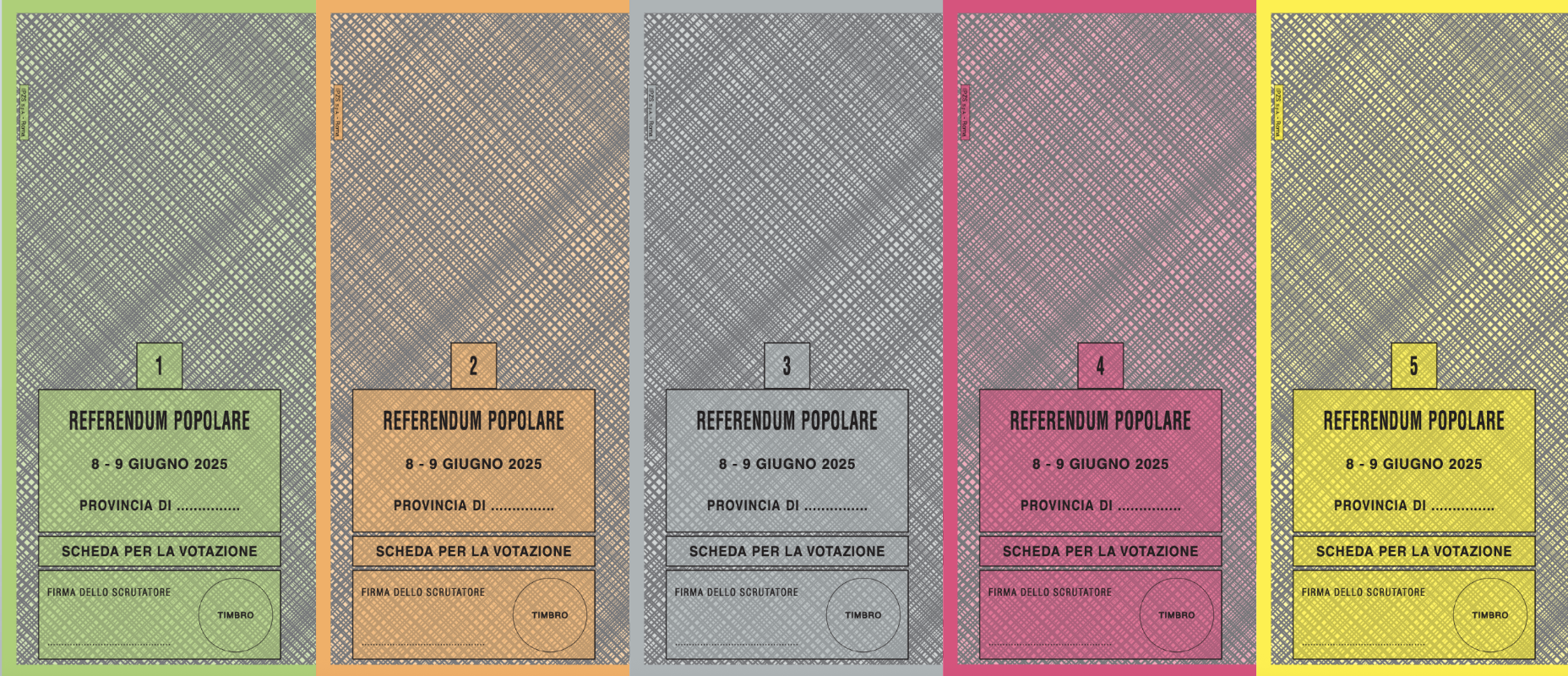
- Ballot colors for the five questions of the referendum
- Voting system: Popular referendum
- Outcome: Quorum of 50% + 1 voters not reached making the referendum void

Results
Choice	Votes	%
Yes	12,666,396	83.85%
No	2,213,566	14.65%
Blank	226,447	1.50%
Contested	215	0.00%
Valid votes	15,106,624	99.39%
Invalid votes	92,975	0.61%
Total votes (Note: Average of the outcome of the 5 questions)	15,199,599	100.00%
Registered voters/turnout	51,301,377	29.89%

Repeal of limitations on reinstatement following unlawful dismissal
Yes	87.57%
No	12.43%

Repeal of constraints on judicial discretion in employment termination cases
Yes	86.02%
No	13.98%

Repeal of liberalized use of fixed-term agency employment
Yes	87.53%
No	12.47%

Repeal of joint liability provisions for workplace accidents in subcontracting
Yes	85.78%
No	14.22%

Repeal of extended requirements for acquiring Italian citizenship
Yes	65.34%
No	34.66%

The 2025 Italian referendum, officially the 2025 Abrogative Referendums in Italy (Italian: Referendum abrogativi in Italia del 2025), were held on 8 and 9 June, concurrently with the second round of the local elections. The objective of the referendums was the repeal of four labor laws, two of which were originally introduced as part of the Jobs Act in 2016, and an amendment to the law on the acquisition of Italian citizenship by foreign residents.

The referendum question on the request for Italian citizenship was initially promoted by the More Europe secretary Riccardo Magi, as well as by the parties Possible, Italian Socialist Party, Italian Radicals, and Communist Refoundation Party, and numerous civil society associations, with a collection of signatures, also carried out digitally, which collected more than 637,000 signatures. The referendum questions on work were promoted by the Italian General Confederation of Labour (CGIL) with a public collection of signatures, which gathered over four million signatures.

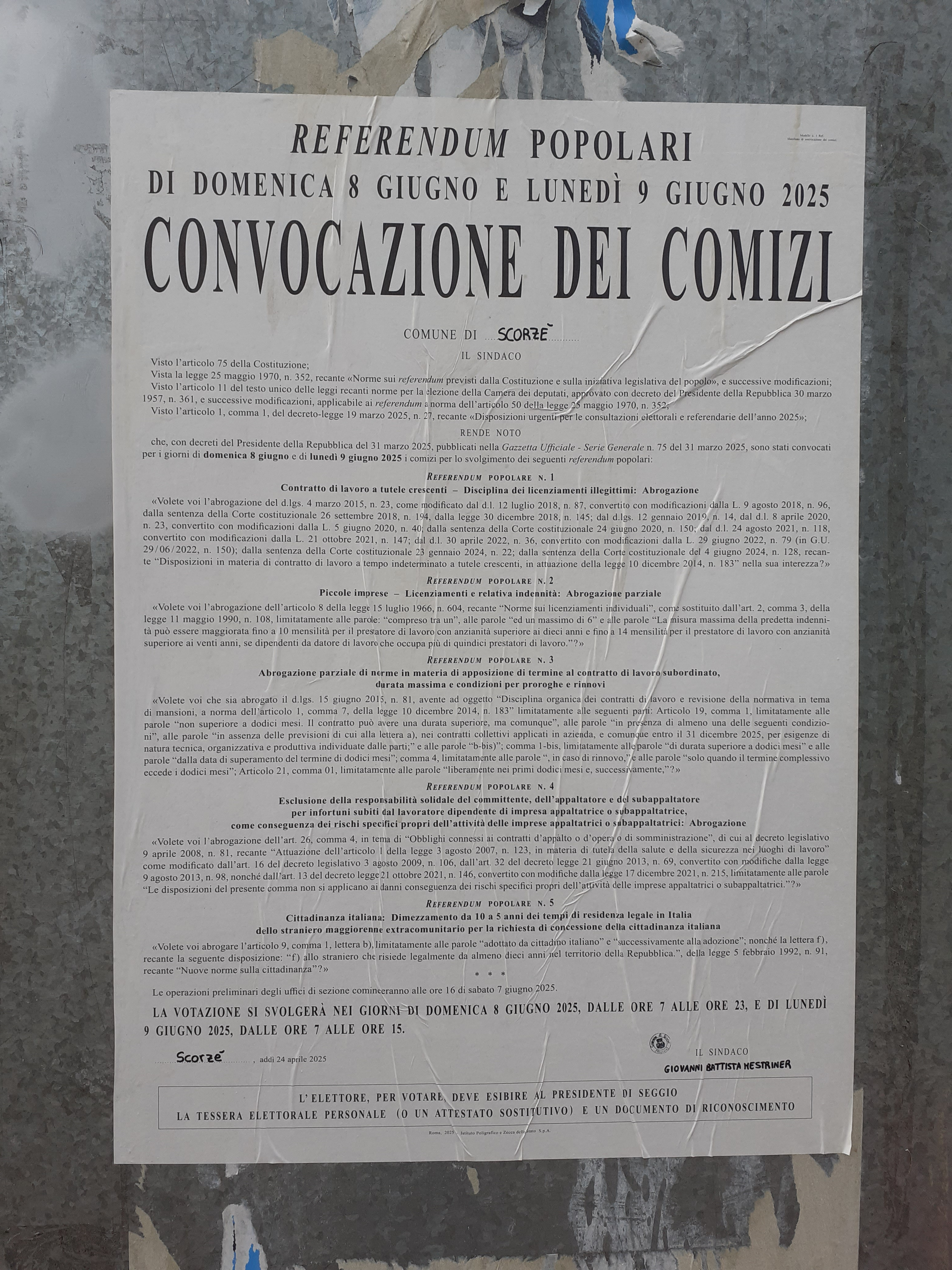
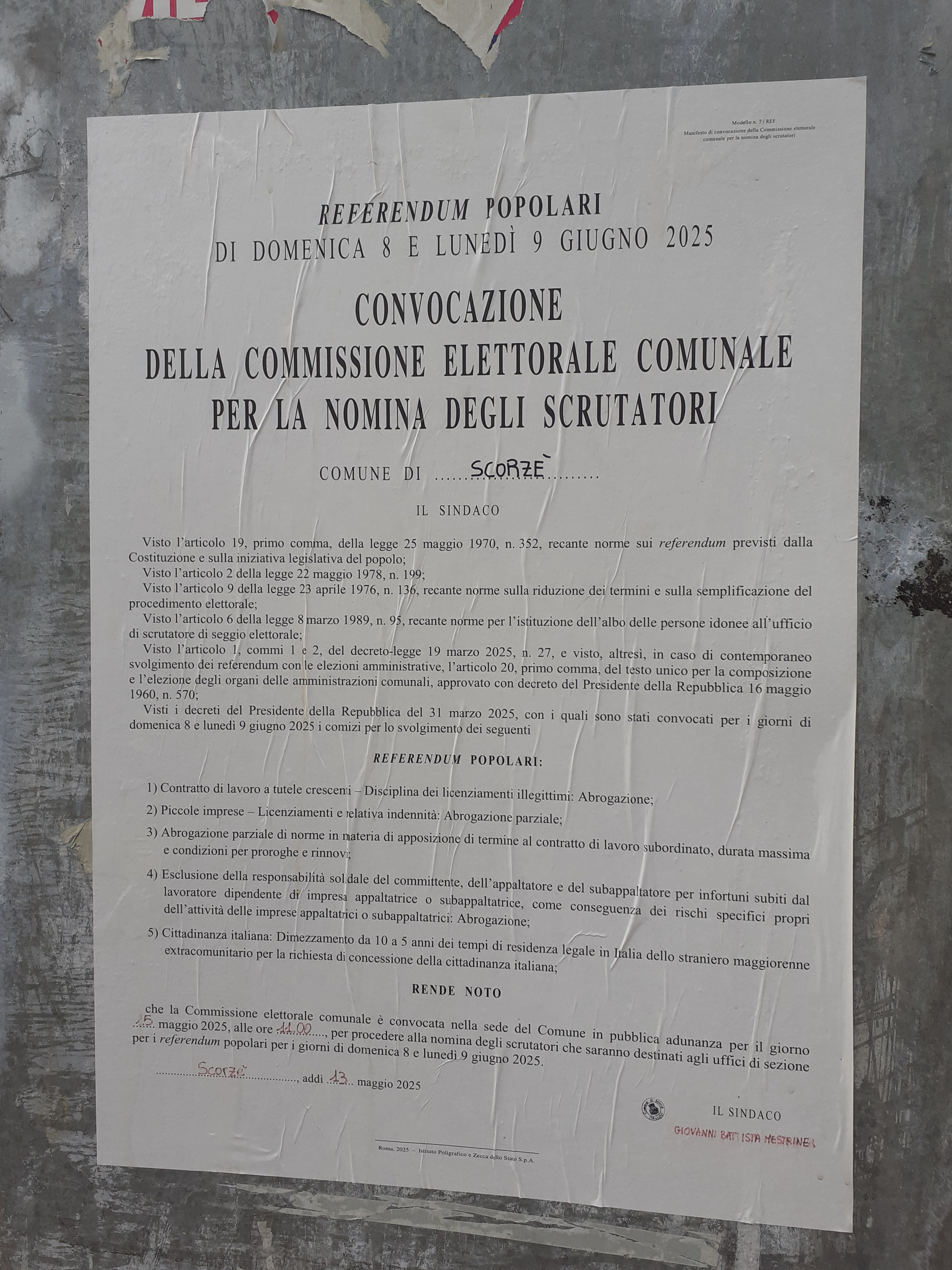
Posters announcing the convening of the electoral assemblies for the referendums

All five questions were declared admissible by the Constitutional Court during the council chamber of 20 January 2025, in which instead the proposal for a referendum to repeal the Calderoli law on differentiated autonomy was rejected and declared inadmissible. For the result to be valid, at least 50% + 1 eligible voters quorum had to be reached with at least 50% of participants approving. As none of the referendums reached the required turnout, the results were consequently rendered void.

== Referendum initiative ==
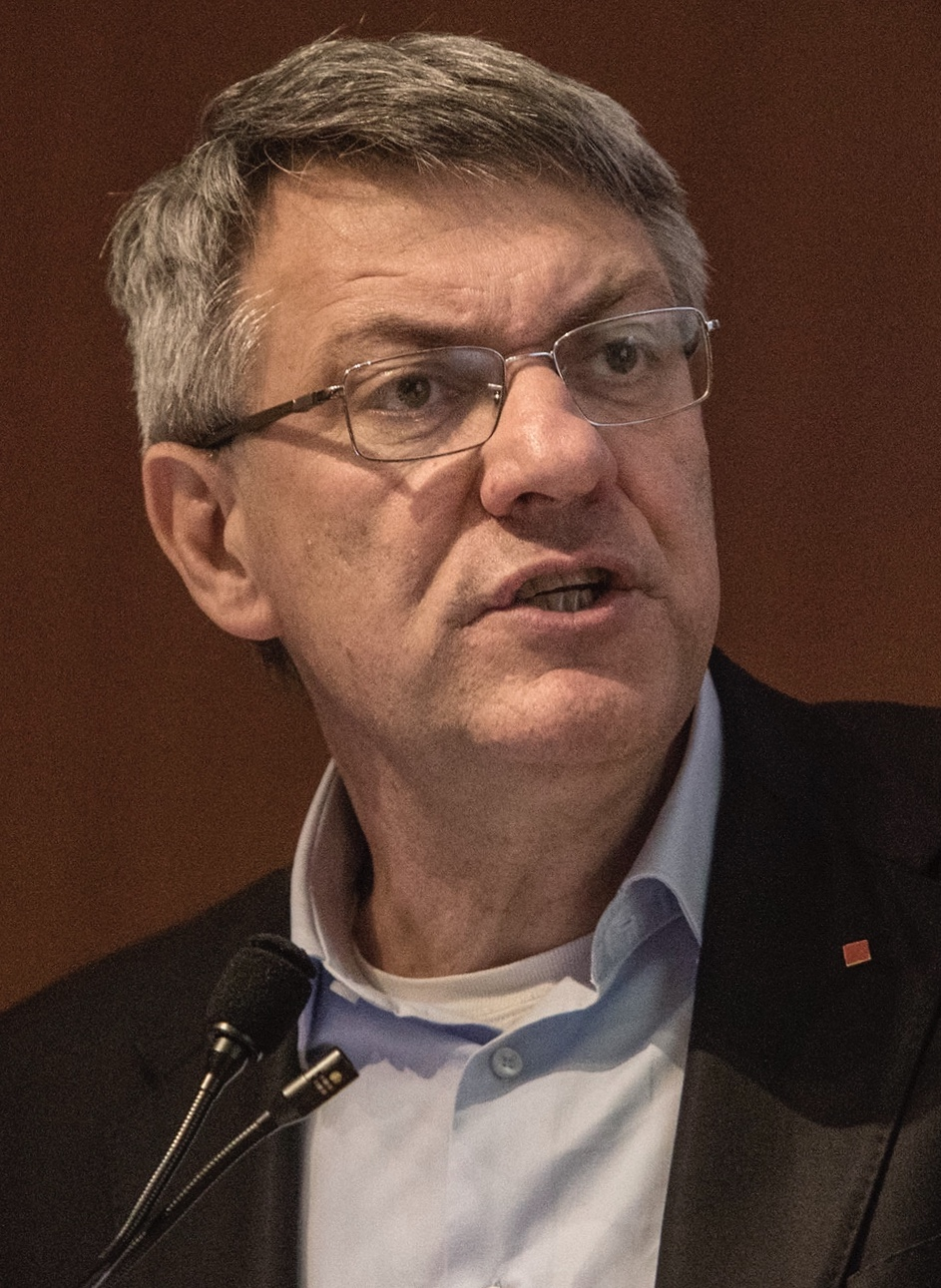
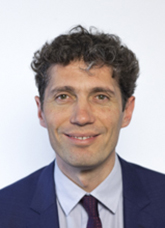
Maurizio Landini (left), president of the labour committee; Riccardo Magi (right), president of the citizenship committee

=== Referendum on labour ===
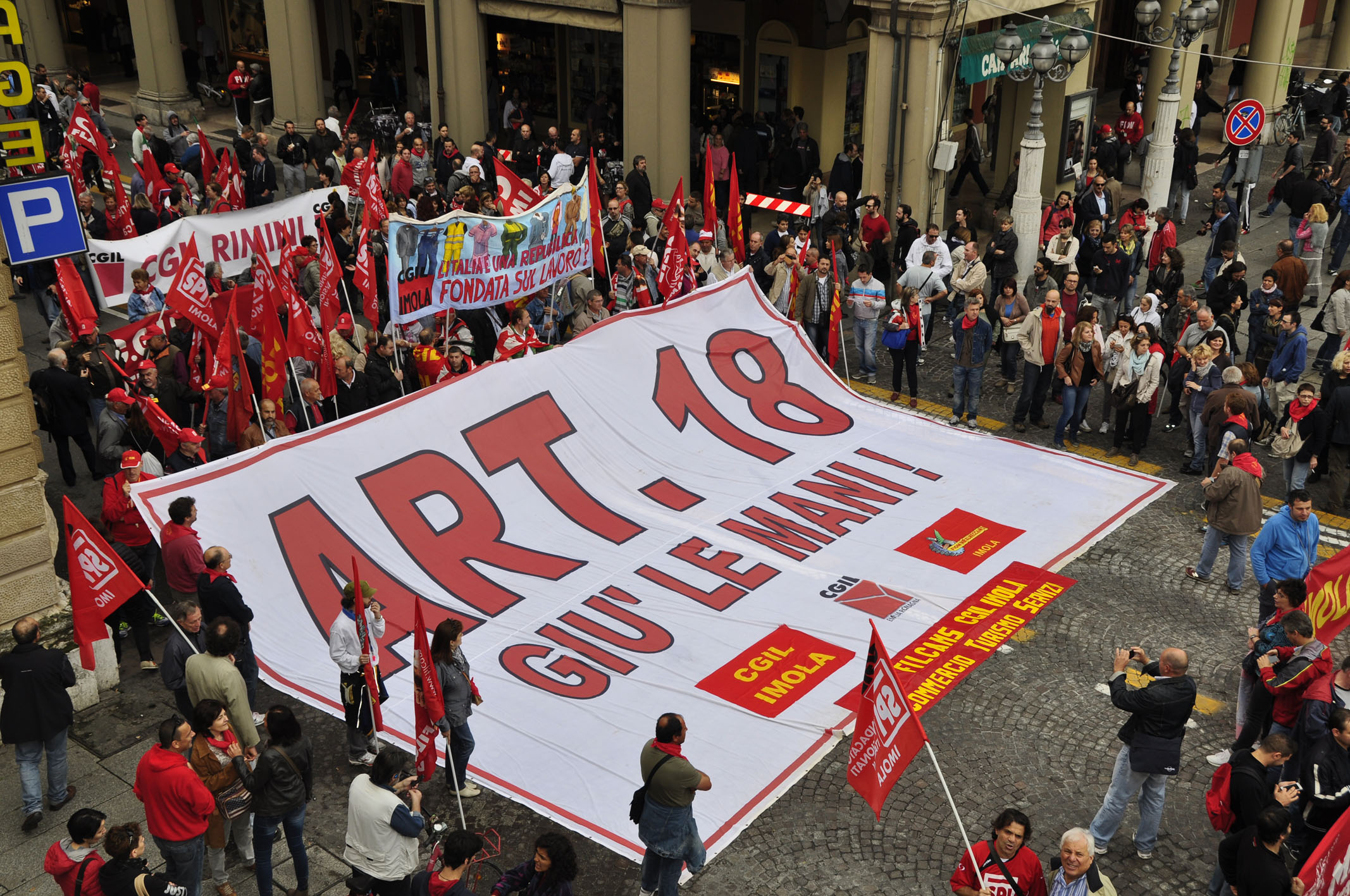
Strike and trade union demonstration in defence of Article 18 of the Workers' Statute (Bologna, 16 October 2014)

After numerous strikes and demonstrations against the labour reform introduced by the Jobs Act in March 2014 by the Renzi government, in 2016 the CGIL launched a campaign to collect signatures to carry out a referendum to restore the protections of Article 18 of the Workers' Statute for unlawful dismissals and extend them to all companies with at least five employees: this article, which provided for the reinstatement of the worker in the workplace in the case of unlawful dismissal, had been amended in 2015 by the Jobs Act, which instead provided for economic compensation. The CGIL managed to collect 3.3 million signatures throughout Italy; however, on 11 January 2017 the Constitutional Court declared the referendum question inadmissible because it had also been badly formulated in a proactive manner in order to extend the protection of Article 18 to companies with fewer than 15 employees. Further questions concerning the abolition of work vouchers and the repeal of the provisions limiting joint and several liability in the field of contracting were instead admitted by the Constitutional Court, so the date of 28 May 2017 was set for the abrogative referendums to be held; however, the Gentiloni government urgently approved Decree-Law no. 25 of 17 March 2017, which abrogated the provisions subject to the referendum, which was therefore annulled after the entry into force of the conversion law No. 49 of 20 April 2017.

In the general assembly of 26 March 2024, the CGIL approved the launch of a referendum consultation on four issues relating to work, three of which related to points of the Jobs Act reform (implemented by the Renzi government), as part of an overall mobilization strategy that also included a general strike (later held on 11 April), general demonstrations, popular initiative bills and support for disputes over the renewal of collective agreements. The general secretary of the union, Maurizio Landini, officially announced the launch of the signature collection for the following 25 April, Liberation Day, with numerous initiatives and stalls in various cities. The referendum campaign was accompanied by the slogan "For stable, dignified, protected and safe work I'll put my signature"; each of the four adjectives included in the sentence referred to one of the questions posed.

On 12 June 2024, the organizing secretary of the CGIL, Luigi Giove, announced that the campaign had reached and exceeded the 500,000 signatures required under Article 75 of the Italian Constitution. The signatures, quantified by Landini at four million, were finally deposited in the Supreme Court of Cassation on the following July 19. All four questions were declared legal by the Central Referendum Office on 12 December 2024. They were declared admissible by the Constitutional Court on 20 January 2025, with rulings filed on 7 February.

=== Referendum on citizenship ===
Residence requirements in years for naturalization by country: 2 years 2.5 years 3 years 4 years 5 years 7 years / 8 years 9 years 10 years 12 years 14 years 15 years / 20 years 25 years 30 years 35 years No naturalization allowed Not stated by law or varies No data

The referendum question that required halving the years of legal residence to apply for Italian citizenship was initiated by More Europe secretary Riccardo Magi, who filed it with the Supreme Court of Cassation on 4 September 2024, less than a month before the deadline for collecting signatures. The promoters of the referendum include the political parties More Europe, Possible, Italian Socialist Party, Italian Radicals, and Communist Refoundation Party, numerous associations of people with a migrant background such as Italians without citizenship, CoNNGI (National Coordination of New Italian Generations), and Idem Network, and other organizations including Libera, Gruppo Abele, A Buon Diritto and Società della Ragione, as well as various personalities such as Mauro Palma (former National Guarantor of the rights of persons deprived of personal liberty), Luigi Manconi, and Ivan Novelli (president of Greenpeace Italy). The issue of the citizenship law, already at the centre of failed attempts at amendment in Parliament on several occasions, had returned to the attention of public opinion after the 2024 Summer Olympics in Paris which had seen the successes of many Italian athletes of foreign origin (such as Paola Egonu and Myriam Sylla, winners of the Olympic gold medal for the women's national volleyball team) who in the past had struggled to be officially recognised as Italian.

Given the tight deadline of September 30, the promoting committee focused almost exclusively on digital signature collection using the new free platform made available for this purpose by the Government starting from July 26 and already successfully used for the signature collection for the referendum against differentiated autonomy. Despite the short time available, thanks also to the push of personalities such as the historian Alessandro Barbero, the writer Roberto Saviano, the cartoonist Zerocalcare, the director Matteo Garrone, the singers Ghali, Dargen D'Amico and Malika Ayane, the actress Kasia Smutniak and the coach of the women's national volleyball team Julio Velasco, the referendum reached the goal of 500,000 signatures on September 25. The signatures, which finally reached the number of 637,487, were deposited by the promoters at the Supreme Court of Cassation on September 30. The question was declared compliant with the law by the Central Referendum Office on 12 December 2024 and declared admissible by the Constitutional Court on 20 January 2025, with a ruling filed on 7 February.

== Questions ==
=== First question ===
- Card colour: Green
- Ballot:

 
 

- Title: Employment contract with increasing protections – regulation of unlawful dismissals: Repeal
- Description:

The question proposes to completely repeal the current legislation which prevents, in companies with more than 15 employees, the reinstatement of workers who have been dismissed unlawfully, if they were hired starting from 7 March 2015, even in the case in which the judge declares the interruption of the relationship unjust or unfounded; these employees are currently entitled exclusively to compensation ranging from 6 to 36 months of salary, in addition to unpaid wages and other contributions for the period between dismissal and the sentence. Reinstatement is expected only in cases of dismissals that are null or discriminatory.

These rules were introduced by Legislative Decree no. 23 of 2015, a part of the Jobs Act reform implemented by the Renzi government and later modified by various rulings of the Constitutional Court. If the referendum is approved, the previous rules would be reinstated, that is Article 18 of the Workers' Statute of 1970, later modified by the Fornero labour reform of 2012: in this way, the possibility of reinstatement in cases of unlawful dismissal would once again apply to all workers, but always within the limits set by the Fornero reform. As a result, compensation for individual dismissals would be limited to a range of 12 to 24 months of salary; instead, employees involved in collective dismissals (involving at least five people) judged to be unlawful would be reinstated.

Text of the question
Do you want the repeal of Legislative Decree no. 23 of 4 March 2015, containing "Provisions regarding permanent employment contracts with increasing protections, in implementation of Law no. 183 of 10 December 2014" in its entirety?

=== Second question ===
- Card colour: Orange
- Ballot:

 
 

- Title: Small Businesses - Layoffs and related compensation: partial repeal
- Description:

Text of the question
Do you want the repeal of Article 8 of Law No. 604 of 15 July 1966, containing "Rules on individual dismissals", as replaced by Article 2, paragraph 3, of Law No. 108 of 11 May 1990, limited to the words: "between one", the words "and a maximum of 6" and the words "The maximum amount of the aforementioned compensation may be increased up to 10 months' salary for employees with seniority of more than ten years and up to 14 months' salary for employees with seniority of more than twenty years, if employed by an employer who employs more than fifteen employees."?

=== Third question ===
- Card colour: Grey
- Ballot:

 
 

- Title: Partial repeal of provisions on the application of a term to subordinate employment contracts, maximum duration and conditions for extensions and renewals
- Description:

Text of the question
Do you want the repeal of Article 19 of Legislative Decree No. 81 of 15 June 2015, containing "Organic discipline of employment contracts and revision of the regulations on duties, pursuant to Article 1, paragraph 7, of Law No. 183 of 10 December 2014", paragraph 1, limited to the words "not exceeding twelve months. The contract may have a longer duration, but in any case", the words "in the presence of at least one of the following conditions", the words "in the absence of the provisions referred to in letter a), in the collective agreements applied in the company, and in any case by 31 December 2024, for technical, organizational and production needs identified by the parties;" and the words "b bis)"; paragraph 1-bis, limited to the words "lasting more than twelve months" and the words “from the date of exceeding the twelve-month term"; paragraph 4, limited to the words "in case of renewal," and to the words "only when the overall term exceeds twelve months"; Article 21, paragraph 01, limited to the words "freely in the first twelve months and, subsequently,"?

=== Fourth question ===
- Card colour: Red
- Ballot:

 
 

- Title: Exclusion of joint liability of the client, the contractor and the subcontractor for injuries suffered by the employee of a contracting or subcontracting company, as a consequence of the specific risks inherent in the activity of the contracting or subcontracting companies: Repeal
- Description:

Text of the question
Do you want the repeal of art. 26, paragraph 4, of Legislative Decree no. 81 of 9 April 2008, containing "Implementation of Article 1 of Law no. 123 of 3 August 2007, regarding the protection of health and safety in the workplace" as amended by art. 16 of Legislative Decree no. 106 of 3 August 2009, by art. 32 of Legislative Decree no. 69 of 21 June 2013, converted with amendments by Law no. 98 of 9 August 2013, as well as by art. 13 of Legislative Decree no. 146 of 21 October 2021, converted with amendments by Law no. 215, limited to the words "The provisions of this paragraph do not apply to damages resulting from specific risks inherent in the activity of contracting or subcontracting companies."

=== Fifth question ===
- Card colour: Yellow
- Ballot:

 
 

- Title: Italian citizenship: Halving from 10 to 5 years of the time of legal residence in Italy of the non-EU adult foreigner for the request for the granting of Italian citizenship
- Description:

Text of the question
Do you want to repeal art. 9, paragraph 1, letter b), limited to the words "adopted by an Italian citizen" and "subsequent to the adoption"; as well as letter f), containing the following provision: "f) to a foreigner who has resided legally for at least ten years in the territory of the Republic", of law 5 February 1992, n. 91, containing new rules on citizenship"?

=== Questions dismissed ===
A further question concerning the total repeal of the Calderoli law on differentiated autonomy, supported by almost all the opposition parties to the Meloni Government and by various associations, had collected the necessary signatures to be filed with the Court of Cassation, as well as being formally requested by five regional councils (of Campania, Emilia-Romagna, Apulia, Sardinia and Tuscany). On 20 January 2025, the question was declared inadmissible by the Constitutional Court following its previous ruling no. 192/2024, which had declared many parts of the law unconstitutional, with the consequence of having made the object of the question objectively obscure – significantly reduced as a result of the aforementioned ruling – as well as lacking clarity as to its purpose. Precisely because of sentence no. 192/2024, a second question of partial repeal of the law requested by the same 5 regional councils had already been considered outdated by the Central Office for the Referendum of the Court of Cassation.

== Positions ==
=== Main political parties ===
The following table lists all the positions taken by the political parties present in the Italian Parliament and European Parliament or associated with one of the committees promoting the questions. (Note: Parties are ordered by parliamentary representation and, in the event of a tie, alphabetically. Political movements and associations with parliamentary representation but not constituted as actual parties are not listed, as are political movements with parliamentary representation and federated to one of the parties already listed.)

Party	Ideology	Leader/s	Work				Citizenship	Source(s)
Party	Ideology	Leader/s	1	2	3	4	Citizenship	Source(s)
Brothers of Italy (FdI)	National conservatism	Giorgia Meloni	Abstain	Abstain	Abstain	Abstain	Abstain	
Democratic Party (PD)	Social democracy	Elly Schlein	Yes	Yes	Yes	Yes	Yes	
League (Lega)	Right-wing populism	Matteo Salvini	Abstain	Abstain	Abstain	Abstain	Abstain	
Five Star Movement (M5S)	Populism	Giuseppe Conte	Yes	Yes	Yes	Yes	Freedom of choice (Note: Although the Five Star Movement (M5S) has left the vote open on the citizenship referendum, some members of the party, including leader Giuseppe Conte, have announced the intention to vote in favor of the question.)	
Forza Italia (FI)	Liberal conservatism	Antonio Tajani	Abstain	Abstain	Abstain	Abstain	Abstain	
Italia Viva (IV)	Liberalism	Matteo Renzi	No	No (Note: Freedom of choice)	No	No	Yes	
Action (A)	Liberalism	Carlo Calenda	No	No	No	No	Yes	
Noi Moderati (NM)	Christian democracy	Maurizio Lupi	No	No	No	No	No	
Green Europe (EV)	Green politics	Angelo Bonelli	Yes	Yes	Yes	Yes	Yes	
Italian Left (SI)	Democratic socialism	Nicola Fratoianni	Yes	Yes	Yes	Yes	Yes	
More Europe (+E)	Liberalism	Riccardo Magi	No	No	No	Yes	Yes	
Union of the Centre (UdC)	Christian democracy	Antonio De Poli	No	No	No	No	No	
Centrists for Europe (CpE) (Note: The leader of CpE Pier Ferdinando Casini has invited people to go and vote without giving a clear indication on what to choose.)	Christian democracy	Pier Ferdinando Casini	Freedom of choice	Freedom of choice	Freedom of choice	Freedom of choice	Freedom of choice	
Democrazia Solidale (DemoS)	Christian left	Paolo Ciani	Yes	Yes	Yes	Yes	Yes	
Liberal Democratic Party (PLD)	Liberalism	TBD	No	No	No	No	Yes	
Italian Radicals (RI)	Liberalism	Filippo Blengino	No	No	No	No	Yes	
Partito Progressista (PP)	Progressivism	Massimo Zedda	Yes	Yes	Yes	Yes	Yes	
South calls North (ScN)	Regionalism Populist	Cateno De Luca	Freedom of choice	Freedom of choice	Freedom of choice	Freedom of choice	No	
Valdostan Union	Regionalism	Joël Farcoz	Freedom of choice	Freedom of choice	Freedom of choice	Freedom of choice	Freedom of choice	
Communist Refoundation Party (PRC)	Communism	Maurizio Acerbo	Yes	Yes	Yes	Yes	Yes	
Italian Socialist Party (PSI)	Social democracy	Enzo Maraio	Yes	Yes	Yes	Yes	Yes	
Possible (Pos)	Social democracy	Francesca Druetti	Yes	Yes	Yes	Yes	Yes	
Radical Europe (ER)	Liberalism	Igor Boni	No	No	No	No	Yes	
Volt Italy	Social liberalism	Guido Silvestri	Yes	Yes	Yes	Yes	Yes	
Atheist Democracy	Secularism	Carla Corsetti	Yes	Yes	Yes	Yes	Yes	

=== Main trade unions ===
The following table lists all the positions, if any of the main Italian trade unions, whether or not they are associated with one of the committees promoting the questions.

Trade union	Labor				Citizenship	Source
Trade union	1	2	3	4	5	Source
CGIL (Note: The union and its secretary, Maurizio Landini, directly promoted all four questions on the subject of work.)	Yes	Yes	Yes	Yes	Yes	
UIL	Yes	Freedom of choice	Freedom of choice	Yes	Freedom of choice	
CISL (Note: The union declared itself against the four referendums on work, considering them inappropriate.)	Abstention	Abstention	Abstention	Abstention		
USB	Yes	Yes	Yes	Yes	Yes	

=== Referendum committees ===
On 10 March 2025, the president of the citizenship referendum committee, Riccardo Magi, and his correspondent for the referendums on work, Maurizio Landini, announced that they would attend a meeting, held the following day, with the Secretary of the Council of Ministers, Alfredo Mantovano, and the Minister of the Interior, Matteo Piantedosi, requesting the possibility of voting for students, workers and out-of-town patients, as well as the calling of a single election day for the referendum and administrative elections and adequate media coverage by the RAI networks and other broadcasters.

On 13 March, the Council of Ministers established that the referendums would be held on Sunday 8 and Monday 9 June of the same year, at the same time as the run-off round of the administrative elections, in contrast with the request of the promoters to make the date of the consultations coincide with the first round of the aforementioned elections. On the same occasion, the approval of a decree-law was announced which would have allowed voters who had been away from home for study, work or medical reasons for at least three months before the referendum to request to vote in a polling station other than their municipality of residence, by submitting an application by 5 May.

==== Committees for Yes ====
Committee	Spokesperson(s)	Promoter(s)	Website	Work				Citizenship	Source(s)
Committee	Spokesperson(s)	Promoter(s)	Website	1	2	3	4	Citizenship	Source(s)
Citizenship Referendum (Referendum Cittadinanza)	Riccardo Magi	+E, P, RI, PSI, PRC, PD, EV, SI, ARCI, Libera	referendumcittadinanza.it					Yes	
Committee for the labor referendum 2025 (Comitato per i referendum sul lavoro 2025)	Maurizio Landini	CGIL, ARCI, Libera	referendum2025.it	Yes	Yes	Yes	Yes		

==== Committees for No ====
Committee	Spokesperson(s)	Promoter(s)	Website	Work				Citizenship	Source(s)
Committee	Spokesperson(s)	Promoter(s)	Website	1	2	3	4	Citizenship	Source(s)
Committee for NO to the 4 "Against Work" referendums (Contro il lavoro)	Igor Boni	Radical Europe, Italia Viva		No	No	No	No		
Referendum Committee for the NO and Conscious Abstention (Comitato Referendario per il NO e l’Astensione Consapevole)	Claudio Armeni	ANGPG		No	No	No	No	No	

=== Civil society and organisations ===
On April 28, 2025, an appeal to vote in favor of all the referendums was published by forty prominent figures from research and academia, including Giorgio Parisi, Silvio Garattini, Donatella della Porta, Nadia Urbinati, Salvatore Settis, Marco Doria, Luigi Ferrajoli, and Maria Cecilia Guerra, a deputy. On May 10, another similar appeal was published, promoted by a group of workers affiliated with the SLC CGIL union in Milan and signed, among others, by Angela Finocchiaro, Paolo Fresu, Lella Costa, Lino Guanciale, Marina Massironi, Francesco Paolantoni, Serena Dandini, the Punkreas, Ricky Gianco, and Elio De Capitani.

Alessandro Barbero, Alfiero Grandi, and the FNSI have promoted a vote in favor of all the five questions, whereas Maurizio Ambrosini and the general director of Save the Children Italy, Daniela Fatarella, publicly supported only the referendum on citizenship. More generic appeals to vote, without specific endorsements, came from Geppi Cucciari, Marco Mengoni, Valeria Solarino, Michele Serra, Maurizio Crozza, Vera Gheno and Piero Pelù.

On May 19, 2025, over fifty mayors from various Italian cities published a general appeal encouraging participation in the referendum. AGESCI and the Focolare Movement have adopted the same line as the CEI; Azione Cattolica and the Community of Sant'Egidio have promoted the vote in favor of the question on citizenship, while "Compagnia delle Opere" and Christian Workers Movement have sided in favor of abstention.

==== Student organisations ====
A dedicated student committee titled "Il Futuro Passa dal Sì – Studenti per il 5 Sì" (lit. 'The Future Passes through Yes – Students for the 5 Yes') was formed by the Rete degli Studenti Medi and the Unione degli universitari. This initiative focused on promoting youth engagement and supporting a 'Yes' vote across all five referendum questions. While aligned with the broader objectives of the national Comitato per i Referendum sul Lavoro 2025, the student committee operated autonomously, organizing events, assemblies, and communication campaigns in schools and universities. The committee framed the referendums as directly impacting students' futures, particularly regarding job security, fair employment practices, and access to citizenship. The initiative also intersected with the "Io Voto Fuori Sede" campaign, advocating for students’ voting rights when living away from their registered residence, an issue that affects electoral participation among mobile youth populations.

Committee	Organisation	Spokesperson(s)	Work				Citizenship	Source(s)
Committee	Organisation	Spokesperson(s)	1	2	3	4	Citizenship	Source(s)
Committee	Il Futuro Passa dal Sì – Studenti per il 5 Sì (The Future Passes through Yes - Students for the 5 Yes)	Rete degli Studenti Medi	Paolo Notarnicola	Yes	Yes	Yes	Yes	Yes
Unione degli universitari	Il Futuro Passa dal Sì – Studenti per il 5 Sì (The Future Passes through Yes - Students for the 5 Yes)	Alessandro Bruscella	Yes	Yes	Yes	Yes	Yes	

== Campaigns ==
On February 12 and 13, 2025, during a national meeting of the CGIL at the PalaDozza in Bologna, the referendum campaign on labor-related questions was launched, while the organizations and parties promoting the citizenship referendum held an official assembly on March 7 at the ExtraLibera venue in Rome. On April 11 and 12, the CGIL organized the “Futura 2025” event at the Camera del Lavoro in Milan, featuring a series of discussions on the content and goals of the five referendum questions.

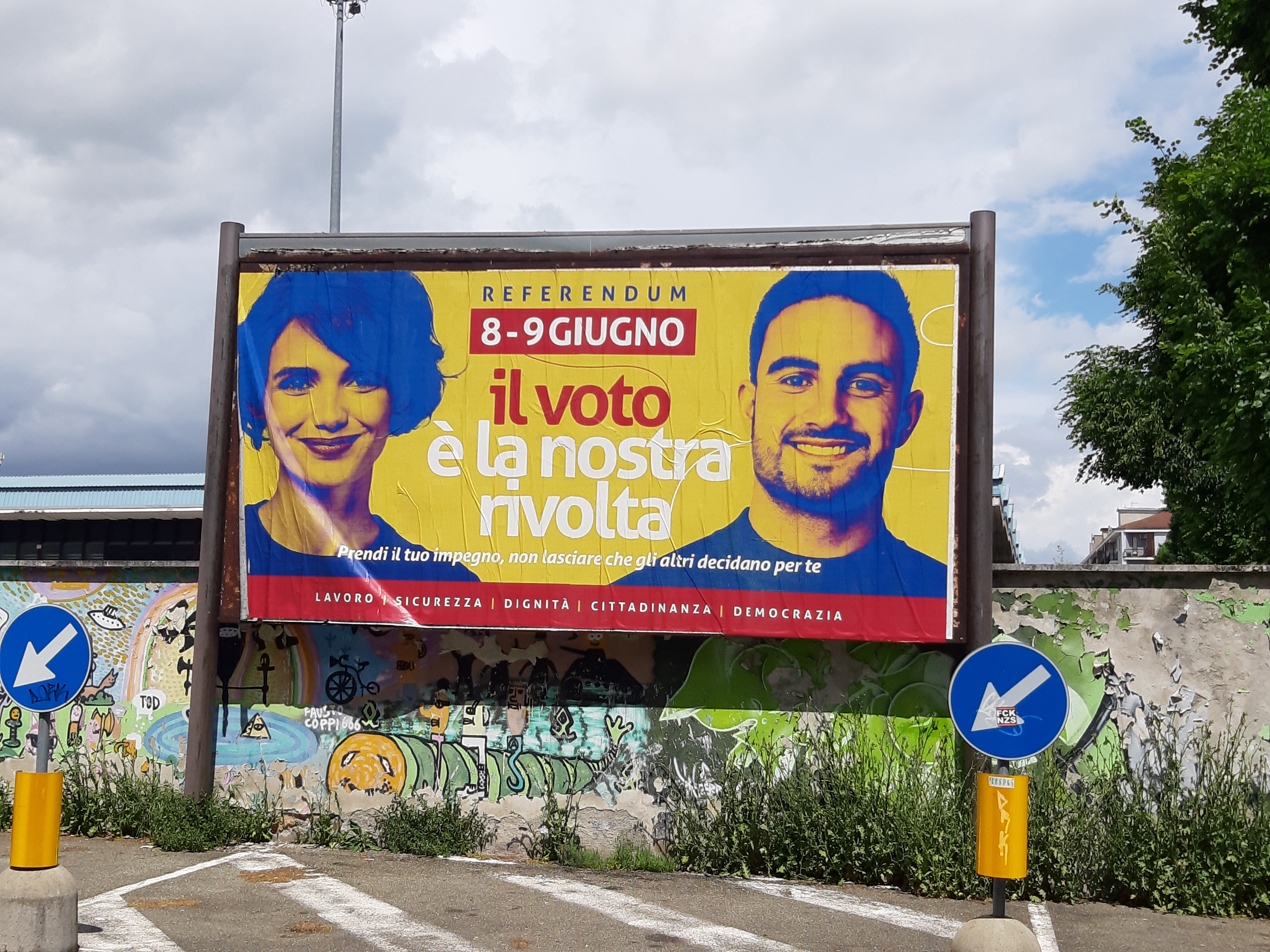
Poster by the "Comitato per i Referendum sul Lavoro e sulla Cittadinanza" promoting the referendum in Alessandria

On April 28, 2025, an appeal in support of all the referendums was published by forty academics and researchers, including the Nobel Prize winner in Physics Giorgio Parisi, Donatella della Porta, Nadia Urbinati, the founder of the Mario Negri Institute for Pharmacological Research Silvio Garattini, Salvatore Settis, former mayor of Genoa, Marco Doria, and deputy Maria Cecilia Guerra. Maurizio Ambrosini and Daniela Fatarella, general director of Save the Children Italia, publicly supported the citizenship referendum, while Alessandro Barbero endorsed voting "yes" on all five questions. Additionally, General voting appeals, without specific endorsements came from Geppi Cucciari, Marco Mengoni, Valeria Solarino, Michele Serra, and Maurizio Crozza.

On the evening of May 14, 2025, some members of the committee promoting the citizenship referendum projected the campaign logo onto the facade of Palazzo Chigi during a flash mob held in Piazza Colonna in Rome. During a pro-Palestinian protest which took place on June 7, 2025, the day before the referendum, and which hosted over 300,000 people, all the organizers went up on the stage and told people to vote "yes" to all of the referendums.

=== Communication via mass media ===
On 2 April 2025, the Rai Parliamentary Supervisory Commission issued a resolution to regulate communication, the organization of the electoral tribunes and the self-managed messages on the five referendum. Towards the end of April, the referendum committees organized a series of demonstrations in front of regional Rai offices in various cities, calling for the public broadcaster to ensure a higher level of information on the upcoming votes.

On 8 April, the Autorità per le Garanzie nelle Comunicazioni (AGCOM) published a resolution on the rules regarding political communication and equal access to the media for the referendum campaigns, aimed at newspapers, magazines, online outlets, polling agencies, and broadcasting stations. On 13 May, AGCOM also issued a warning to Rai and all other national TV and radio broadcasters to ensure "accurate, impartial, and complete information on the referendum questions and the arguments supporting each voting option".

=== Accusations of restrictions on campaigning ===
In May 2025, during an interview for Avvenire, Antonella Soldo, coordinator of the promoting committee for the citizenship referendum, accused the organizers of the "Concerto del Primo Maggio" in Rome of not allowing the hosts and performers to include references to the referendum in their speeches. She also stated that a flash mob organized on the same day by the committee in Piazza San Giovanni in Laterano had been blocked by "about fifteen undercover police officers" due to the lack of authorization.

On 10 May, four CGIL trade unionists and a security staff member of a shopping center in Rome were identified by a patrol of the Polizia di Stato, following a dispute over the union members' distribution of flyers in favor of the referendums. On 14 May 2025, during a question time in the Chamber of Deputies, the MP and citizenship referendum promoter Riccardo Magi entered the chamber dressed as a ghost, accusing the Meloni government of poor information about the five questions and protesting the ruling coalition parties’ call for abstention. The gesture, for which Magi was expelled from the chamber, was compared to a similar one by the Radical activist Marco Pannella during the hunting referendum of 1997.

=== Debates ===
From 12 May to 6 June, Rai Parlamento organized a series of 45 televised debates (two per day, then three starting from 2 June) on Rai 1, Rai 2, and Rai 3, in addition to 45 radio debates. Furthermore, self-managed messages supporting or opposing the questions were also broadcast on Rai 3 and Rai’s radio channels.

== Polls ==
=== Turnout ===
Date	Polling firm/Link	Sample size	Turnout				
Date	Polling firm/Link	Sample size	1st	2nd	3rd	4th	5th
21–22 May 2025	IZI S.p.A.	1058 (Note: Random sampling stratified by gender, age group and region of residence.)	36–42				
14–16 May 2025	Istituto Demopolis	2,000	31–39				
13–14 May 2025	Eumetra MR	800	35				
13 May 2025	Noto sondaggi	-	33				
10–15 May 2025	Lab21	1,000	29.9–33.9				
7–12 May 2025	SWG	1,200 (Note: Proportional sample consisting of adult voters living in Italy. Non respondents: 4,296. Methodology: CATI, CAMI, CAWI.)	32–36				
6–8 May 2025	Ipsos	1,000 (Note: Proportional sample consisting of adult voters disaggregated by gender, age, level of education, employment status, area of residence and size of the municipality of residence. Total contacts: 4,407. Methodology: CATI, CAMI, CAWI.)	32–38				

=== Questions ===
Fieldwork date	Polling firm/Link	Institution	Sample size	Margin of error	1st question				2nd question				3rd question				4th question				5th question			
Fieldwork date	Polling firm/Link	Institution	Sample size	Margin of error	Yes	No	Neither / don't know	Margin	Yes	No	Neither / don't know	Margin	Yes	No	Neither / don't know	Margin	Yes	No	Neither / don't know	Margin	Yes	No	Neither / don't know	Margin
14-16 May 2025	Istituto Demopolis	La7 - Otto e mezzo	2,000	3	65	—N/a	—N/a	-	68	—N/a	—N/a	-	60	—N/a	—N/a	-	67	—N/a	—N/a	-	48	-	—N/a	-
13–14 May 2025	Eumetra MR	Banijay Italia (La7 - Piazza Pulita)	800	±4	75.0	16.4	8.6	58.6	65.2	17.6	17.2	47.6	69.7	13.1	17.2	56.6	65.6	19.7	14.7	45.9	56.2	33.1	10.7	23.1
13 May 2025	Noto sondaggi	Rai 1 - Porta a Porta	-	-	75	13	12	62	62	21	17	41	59	27	21	32	62	21	17	41	52	40	12	12
7–12 May 2025	SWG	TG La7	1,200	±2.8	77	13	10	64	68	14	18	54	72	13	15	59	74	13	13	61	56	32	12	24
6–8 May 2025	Ipsos	Corriere della Sera	1,000	±3.1	30	5	65	11	26	7	67	7	29	5	66	17	33	5	62	24	23	12	65	8

== Outcome ==
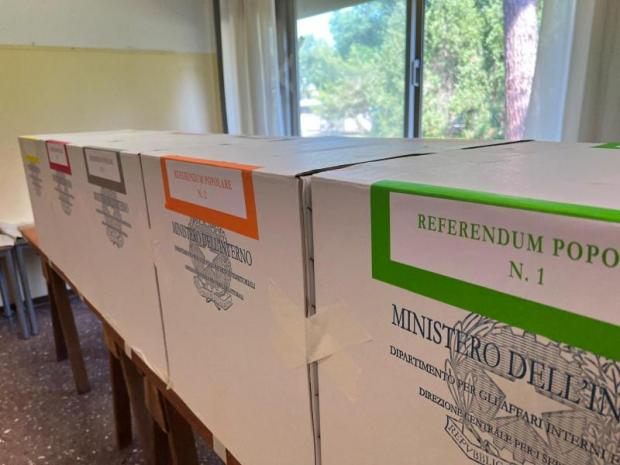
Ballot boxes for voting in Venice

The electorate for the 5 referendum questions was 51,301,377 voters, of which 45,997,941 in Italy (registered in 61,591 sections) and 5,303,436 abroad (registered in 1,863 consular districts). The quorum was reached in only 28 Italian municipalities (of which 11 engaged in local elections), with the primacy of Rosello (Chieti) with a 66% turnout; in the foreign constituency the quorum was reached in 13 countries, including Djibouti where there was a turnout of 102.41%. In accordance with the combined provisions of Law 459/2001, Article 14.1, and Presidential Decree 104/2003, Article 18.5, ballot operations were not conducted in 31 consular districts of Venezuela and in a singular consular districts of the Netherlands. This was due to the late arrival of ballot envelopes in Rome, after the start of the official counting process. As Italian law requires that votes cast abroad be counted simultaneously with those cast on national territory, any ballots received after the deadline are excluded from the count and are not considered for voter turnout purposes.

=== Results ===
First Question
Choice	Votes	%
For	13,031,478	87.57
Against	1,850,491	12.43
Total	14,881,969	100.00
Registered voters/turnout	51,301,377	29.89
Turnout needed		50.00

Second Question
Choice	Votes	%
For	12,790,348	86.02
Against	2,078,211	13.98
Total	14,868,559	100.00
Registered voters/turnout	51,301,377	29.89
Turnout needed		50.00

Third Question
Choice	Votes	%
For	12,997,490	87.53
Against	1,851,990	12.47
Total	14,849,480	100.00
Registered voters/turnout	51,301,377	29.89
Turnout needed		50.00

Fourth Question
Choice	Votes	%
For	12,763,767	85.79
Against	2,115,019	14.21
Total	14,878,786	100.00
Registered voters/turnout	51,301,377	29.90
Turnout needed		50.00

Fifth Question
Choice	Votes	%
For	9,748,896	65.34
Against	5,172,117	34.66
Total	14,921,013	100.00
Registered voters/turnout	51,301,377	29.91
Turnout needed		50.00

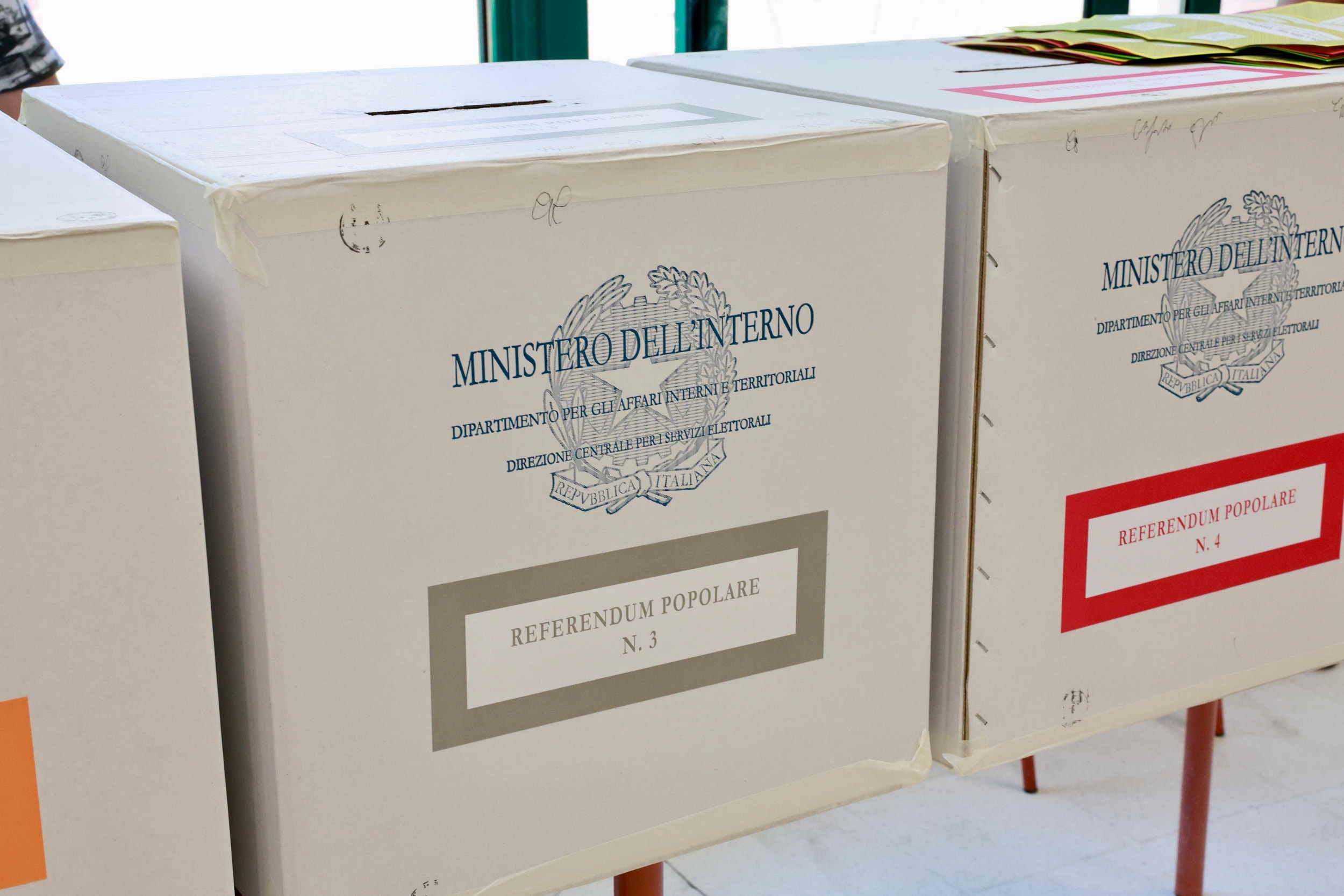
Ballot boxes for voting in Empoli

Results by region
Region	1st question		2nd question		3rd question		4th question		5th question	
Region	Yes	No	Yes	No	Yes	No	Yes	No	Yes	No
Aosta Valley	85.29%	14.71%	83.38%	16.62%	85.16%	14.84%	81.37%	18.63%	64.23%	35.77%
Piedmont	86.80%	13.20%	85.04%	14.96%	86.87%	13.13%	85.35%	14.65%	64.21%	35.79%
Liguria	89.71%	10.29%	88.10%	11.90%	89.38%	10.62%	87.98%	12.02%	65.40%	34.60%
Lombardy	85.51%	14.49%	84.15%	15.85%	85.91%	14.09%	84.24%	15.76%	63.29%	36.71%
Trentino-Alto Adige/Südtirol	83.68%	16.32%	82.10%	17.90%	83.40%	16.60%	81.70%	18.30%	60.06%	39.94%
Veneto	84.56%	15.44%	83.07%	16.93%	84.90%	15.10%	82.75%	17.25%	61.96%	38.04%
Friuli-Venezia Giulia	84.84%	15.16%	83.23%	16.77%	84.86%	15.14%	82.39%	17.61%	60.56%	39.44%
Emilia-Romagna	88.08%	11.92%	86.69%	13.31%	88.18%	11.82%	87.10%	12.90%	71.36%	28.64%
Tuscany	89.55%	10.45%	88.20%	11.80%	89.47%	10.53%	88.60%	11.40%	67.06%	32.94%
Marche	88.48%	11.52%	86.88%	13.12%	88.30%	11.70%	86.59%	13.41%	62.33%	37.67%
Umbria	90.06%	9.94%	88.50%	11.50%	89.80%	10.20%	88.11%	11.89%	64.61%	35.39%
Lazio	91.13%	8.87%	89.61%	10.39%	90.95%	9.05%	89.45%	10.55%	69.07%	30.93%
Abruzzo	90.14%	9.86%	88.65%	11.35%	89.98%	10.02%	87.77%	12.23%	62.26%	37.74%
Molise	91.66%	8.34%	90.19%	9.81%	91.27%	8.73%	89.31%	10.69%	63.95%	36.05%
Campania	93.68%	6.32%	92.39%	7.61%	93.54%	6.46%	91.56%	8.44%	68.85%	31.15%
Basilicata	91.22%	8.78%	89.81%	10.19%	90.71%	9.29%	88.99%	11.01%	64.47%	35.53%
Apulia	91.88%	8.12%	90.41%	9.59%	91.57%	8.43%	89.56%	10.44%	66.23%	33.77%
Calabria	92.93%	7.07%	91.62%	8.38%	92.65%	7.35%	90.87%	9.13%	67.03%	32.97%
Sicily	92.20%	7.80%	90.58%	9.42%	91.87%	8.13%	89.43%	10.57%	66.19%	33.81%
Sardinia	92.98%	7.02%	91.66%	8.34%	92.66%	7.34%	90.97%	9.03%	75.27%	24.73%
Total Italy	89.06%	10.94%	87.60%	12.40%	89.04%	10.96%	87.35%	12.65%	65.49%	34.51%
Europe	77.45%	22.55%	74.40%	25.60%	77.45%	22.55%	74.46%	25.54%	63.52%	36.48%
South America	61.42%	38.58%	59.40%	40.60%	60.93%	39.07%	59.12%	40.88%	63.44%	36.56%
North & Central America	68.66%	31.34%	66.48%	33.52%	68.52%	31.48%	65.94%	34.06%	65.20%	34.80%
Africa, Asia, Oceania, Antarctica	71.31%	28.69%	69.06%	30.94%	71.06%	28.94%	68.24%	31.76%	60.05%	39.95%
Overseas constituencies	69.31%	30.69%	66.81%	33.19%	69.06%	30.94%	66.66%	33.34%	63.45%	36.55%
Total (Italy + Overseas)	87.57%	12.43%	86.02%	13.98%	87.53%	12.47%	85.78%	14.22%	65.34%	34.66%

=== Turnout ===
Voter turnout
Question	Italy				Abroad	Total
Question	Sunday, June 8			Monday, June 9	Abroad	Total
Question	12:00 PM	19:00 PM	23:00 PM	15:00 PM	Abroad	Total
1st question	7.41%	16.16%	22.73%	30.58%	23.76%	29.89%
2nd question	7.41%	16.16%	22.73%	30.58%	23.77%	29.89%
3rd question	7.42%	16.16%	22.73%	30.58%	23.74%	29.89%
4th question	7.41%	16.16%	22.74%	30.60%	23.74%	29.90%
5th question	7.41%	16.16%	22.73%	30.59%	23.87%	29.91%

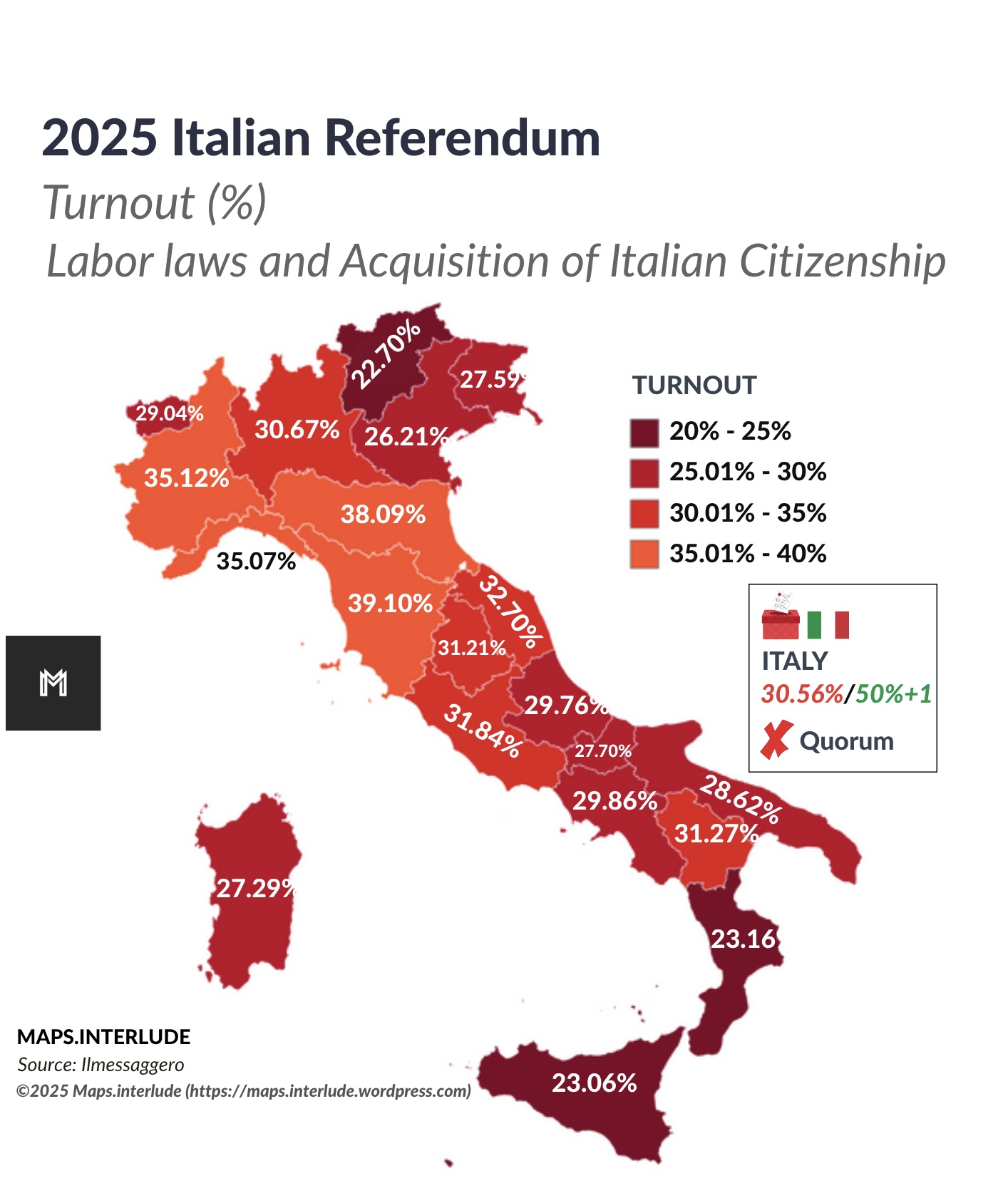
Turnout by regions

Voter turnout by region
Region	1st Question	2nd Question	3rd Question	4th Question	5th Question
Aosta Valley	29.04%	29.03%	29.03%	29.01%	29.05%
Piedmont	35.20%	35.20%	35.21%	35.22%	35.24%
Liguria	35.07%	35.06%	35.08%	35.08%	35.05%
Lombardy	30.70%	30.69%	30.70%	30.73%	30.75%
Trentino-Alto Adige/Südtirol	22.70%	22.70%	22.70%	22.71%	22.72%
Veneto	26.21%	26.21%	26.22%	26.23%	26.24%
Friuli-Venezia Giulia	27.58%	27.57%	27.58%	27.59%	27.59%
Emilia-Romagna	38.10%	38.09%	38.10%	38.12%	38.11%
Tuscany	39.10%	39.09%	39.10%	39.12%	39.09%
Marche	32.70%	32.70%	32.70%	32.71%	32.67%
Umbria	31.21%	31.21%	31.21%	31.22%	31.18%
Lazio	31.86%	31.86%	31.86%	31.87%	31.85%
Abruzzo	29.77%	29.77%	29.77%	29.77%	29.73%
Molise	27.70%	27.70%	27.70%	27.70%	27.67%
Campania	29.85%	29.85%	29.85%	29.85%	29.85%
Basilicata	31.26%	31.26%	31.26%	31.27%	31.26%
Apulia	28.61%	28.61%	28.61%	28.61%	28.60%
Calabria	23.81%	23.81%	23.81%	23.81%	23.82%
Sicily	23.10%	23.10%	23.10%	23.10%	23.09%
Sardinia	27.73%	27.73%	27.73%	27.74%	27.73%
Total Italy	30.58%	30.58%	30.58%	30.59%	30.59%
Europe	19.19%	19.18%	19.18%	19.21%	19.33%
South America	34.59%	34.61%	34.56%	34.48%	34.63%
North and Central America	16.45%	16.50%	16.43%	16.52%	16.64%
Africa, Asia, Oceania and Antarctica	18.09%	18.14%	18.05%	16.52%	18.16%
Overseas Constituency	23.76%	23.77%	23.74%	23.74%	23.87%
Total (Italy + Overseas)	29.89%	29.89%	29.89%	29.90%	29.91%

== See also ==
- 2025 Italian local elections
- 2025 Italian regional elections
- 2025 elections in the European Union
