= 2025 elections in the European Union =

- 2025
- National elections
National elections in member states
Parliamentary or presidential election
No election

The 2025 elections in the European Union include national and regional elections in the EU member states.

== National elections ==
=== Parliamentary elections ===
Member state	Election	Parliament before	Head of Government before	Party	EU Party	Parliament after	Head of Government after	Party	EU Party
Ireland (senate only)	29–30 January		Micheál Martin	Fianna Fáil	ALDE		Micheál Martin	Fianna Fáil	ALDE
Germany	23 February		Olaf Scholz	SPD	PES		Friedrich Merz	CDU	EPP
Portugal	18 May		Luís Montenegro	PSD	EPP		Luís Montenegro	PSD	EPP
Czech Republic	3–4 October		Petr Fiala	ODS	ECR		Andrej Babis	ANO	Patriots
Netherlands	29 October		Dick Schoof	Ind.	Ind.		Rob Jetten	D66	ALDE

==== By-elections ====
- Czech Republic, Senate: 2025 Brno-City by-election, 17–18 January
- France, National Assembly: By-elections to the 17th National Assembly of France, select days from January to October
- Hungary, National Assembly: By-elections to the 9th National Assembly of Hungary, select days from January to March

=== Presidential elections ===
State	Date	President before	Party	EU Party	President after	Party	EU Party
Romania	4 May; 18 May	Ilie Bolojan (acting)	PNL	EPP	Nicușor Dan	Ind.	Ind.

=== Presidential elections in parliamentary states ===
State	Date	President before	Party	EU Party	President after	Party	EU Party
Croatia	29 December 2024; 12 January	Zoran Milanović	SDP	PES	Zoran Milanović	SDP	PES
Greece	25 January; 31 January; 6 February; 12 February	Katerina Sakellaropoulou	Ind.	Ind.	Konstantinos Tasoulas	ND	EPP
Poland	18 May; 1 June	Andrzej Duda	PiS	ECR	Karol Nawrocki	Ind.	Ind.
Ireland	24 October	Michael D. Higgins	Ind.	Ind.	Catherine Connolly	Ind.	Ind.

== Referendums ==
- 2025 Italian referendum, 8 and 9 June
- 2025 Slovenian referendum, 23 November

== Local elections ==
=== Austria ===
- 2025 Burgenland state election, 19 January
- 2025 Viennese state election, 27 April

=== Croatia ===
All twenty counties held elections on 18 May and 1 June.

=== Denmark ===
All four regions held on 18 November. The governing Social Democrats suffered significant losses. Sisse Marie Welling of the Green Left will become the first lord mayor of Copenhagen not selected by the Social Democrats in the office's history.

=== Finland ===
All twenty-one wellbeing services counties held elections on 13 April.

=== Germany ===
- 2025 Hamburg state election, 2 March

=== Italy ===
- 2025 Italian local elections, 25–26 May and 8–9 June

Seven regions held elections.

=== Latvia ===
All 36 municipalities and state cities held municipal council elections on June 7. Voters in Varakļāni Municipality voted in the Madona Municipality Council elections as the former merged into the latter immediately after the election.

=== Portugal ===
- 2025 Madeiran regional election, 23 March

All 308 municipalities and 3,259 parishes held elections on 12 October.

=== Romania ===
A snap mayoral election was held in the capital city of Bucharest following the election of former mayor Nicușor Dan as president of Romania.

=== Spain ===
- 2025 Extremaduran regional election, 21 December
