= Aktion kritischer Schüler innen =

Austrian youth organisation

Action of Critical Students Aktion kritischer Schüller_innen (AKS)
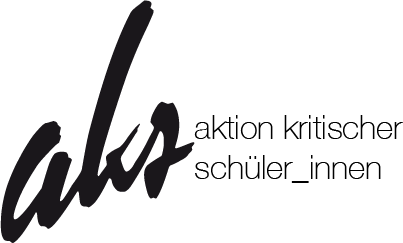
- Chairperson: Dede Koudouovoh
- Founded: 1976 in Upper Austria
- Headquarters: Amtshausgasse 4, A-1050; Vienna, Austria
- Mother party: Sozialdemokratische Partei Österreichs (SPÖ)
- International affiliation: Organising Bureau of European School Student Unions (OBESSU)
- Newspaper: Syntax
- Website: aks.at

The Action of Critical Students (abbreviated AKS or aks) is an Austrian student organization and affiliated organization of the Social Democratic Party of Austria (SPÖ). According to its own statements, the AKS advocates for a "democratic, socially just, and fear-free" school and society. Since 14 July 2024, Dede Koudouovoh has been the Federal Chairperson of the AKS. The AKS has its headquarters in the same building as the Socialist Youth Austria (SJÖ) and International Union of Socialist Youth (IUSY).

== Structure ==
The student organization is led by a six-member federal team, which is elected annually at the federal conference. The organization is structured into the federal organization, the state organizations, and their local and school groups. The state chairpersons of the individual state organizations for the school year 2022/23 are:

- Vienna: Jacob Guberner
- Lower Austria: Hanna Klebert
- Upper Austria: Mari-Ann Awayevoo
- Salzburg: Marcus Gallei
- Tyrol: Emma Lüth
- Vorarlberg: Anna Huwe
- Carinthia: Valentina Hausdorfer

According to § 76 paragraph 2 of the SPÖ organizational statute, the AKS carries out the party activities of the SPÖ for students, and according to paragraph 5, the AKS statute requires the approval of the federal party executive, with the association secretariat being affiliated with the federal office of the SPÖ. According to § 48 paragraph 18, the AKS appoints three delegates to the federal party congresses of the SPÖ.

The AKS is the only Austrian member of the European network of student organizations, the Organising Bureau of European School Student Unions (OBESSU). Internationally, the AKS cooperates with the German JungdemokratInnen/Junge Linke.

== Positions, Background, and Objectives ==
The Student Organization sees itself as a progressive entity advocating for an "open, solidarity-based, and pacifistic society" where no one faces advantages or disadvantages based on their origin, gender, appearance, sexual orientation, material or religious background. It aims to motivate fellow students to critically engage with the existing societal system, question norms, rules, and conventions, and reflect on what is taken for granted. This, according to them, forms the basis for thinking and acting within the broader context on both regional and global levels. They view school as an integral part of society, shaping the next generation and thus playing a crucial role in societal development. The AKS advocates for adequate state funding of the education system and firmly opposes any dilution of equal opportunities or restrictions on freely accessible and high-quality education.

As a representative body for students, the AKS supports independent projects, provides information and assistance for everyday school life, and offers extracurricular training. Its work is supported by publications, and regular meetings facilitate discussions on current and fundamental issues. Some key areas of AKS activities include school-specific tasks such as participation and active engagement in student representation (at the local, regional, and national levels), AKS local groups, and editorial work for student newspapers. The AKS sees its work grounded on these three pillars.

Until 1973, the Verband Sozialistischer Mittelschüler (VSM) (English: Association of Socialist Middle Schoolers) was the student organization of the SPÖ. Following its detachment from the parent party, the AKS was founded in 1976.

In response to the poor performance of the SPÖ in the National Council elections of 2019, the AKS joined protest actions alongside the Socialist Youth Austria (SJÖ), the VSStÖ, the Young Generation (JG), the Red Falcons, and the FSG Youth, presenting 5 proposals for a reorientation of the SPÖ to the parent party in an open letter. Representatives of the AKS also participated in protests outside the SPÖ parliamentary club as part of this protest.

== Student Representation and Educational Policy ==
In 1981, the AKS saw Harald Rossegger become the first Federal School Speaker of Austria. This achievement was repeated with Martin Wolfram (BS Vienna) in 1990. In 2001, the AKS again secured the position of Federal School Speaker with Jakob Huber (AHS OÖ). From 2003 to 2005, the AKS had Romana Brait (AHS NÖ) and Selma Schmid (AHS Vienna) as two consecutive Federal School Speakers. Since the Federal Student Representation elections in September 2005, the Student Union (ÖVP) has once again provided the Federal School Speaker.

Currently, the AKS holds one of the 29 mandates in the Federal Student Representation.

== AKS Chairpersons ==
- 1998–2001: Oliver Prausmüller (Lower Austria)
- 2001–2003: Nikolaus Kowall (Lower Austria)
- 2003–2004: Katharina Kreissl (Upper Austria)
- 2004–2005: Kim Kadlec (Lower Austria)
- 2005–2006: Ingrid Gogl (Vienna)
- 2006–2008: Sophie Lojka (Vienna)
- 2008–2009: Klaus Baumgartner (Linz)
- 2009–2011: Iris Schwarzenbacher (Salzburg)
- 2011–2012: Eleonora Kleibel (Salzburg)
- 2012–2013: Tatjana Gabrielli (Vorarlberg)
- 2013–2014: Claudia Satler (Vorarlberg)
- 2014–2016: Christina Götschhofer (Upper Austria)
- 2016–2018: Jasmin Chalendi (Vienna)
- 2018–2019: Sara Velic (Vorarlberg)
- 2019–2020: Noomi Anyanwu (Vienna)
- 2020–2021: Nina Mathies (Vorarlberg)
- 2021–2022: Flora Prantl (Vorarlberg)
- 2022–Present: Lina Feurstein (Vorarlberg)

== Other ==
Besides educational policy, AKS is particularly engaged in socio-political issues such as anti-racism, globalization, or anti-discrimination, attempting to convey its views to the public through protests and campaigns.

The regional organizations of AKS regularly organize multi-day seminars, offering workshops on various societal and educational policy topics.

In Vienna, the group operated under the name Axis of Critical Students until August 5, 2020.
