= Unione degli Studenti =

Unione degli Studenti (UdS)
- Unione Degli Studenti
- Founded: 12 March 1994
- Headquarters: Via Stamira, 5 - Rome, Italy
- Location: Italy
- Key people: Federica Corcione, National Coordinator - Francesco Valentini, Responsible Organization
- Affiliations: OBESSU
- Website: Official site

Unione degli Studenti (UdS), meaning The Students' Union, is an Italian anti-fascist and left-wing association of students, part of the OBESSU, the European platform for cooperation between the national school student unions. Since 1 August 2026, when it took place the XVI Congress of the organization, the national coordinator is Federica Corcione.

The Union was founded in 1994 from the merger of several students' organizations and movements who have formed from the dissolution of the FGCI (youth wing of the Italian Communist Party). Before 2007, the UdS cooperated with CGIL, the biggest Italian Trade Union and consequently with UDU, one of the main Italian University Student Union. After the end of the relations with the CGIL, there was a division in the UdS and part of the former association members founded a new Student Union, called Rete degli Studenti, that later on merged with two other high school Student Associations to form the Rete degli Studenti Medi in 2008, which will soon sign a pact with CGIL and UDU.
