= Luigi Ciotti =

Italian Catholic priest (born 1945)

Don Luigi Ciotti OMRI
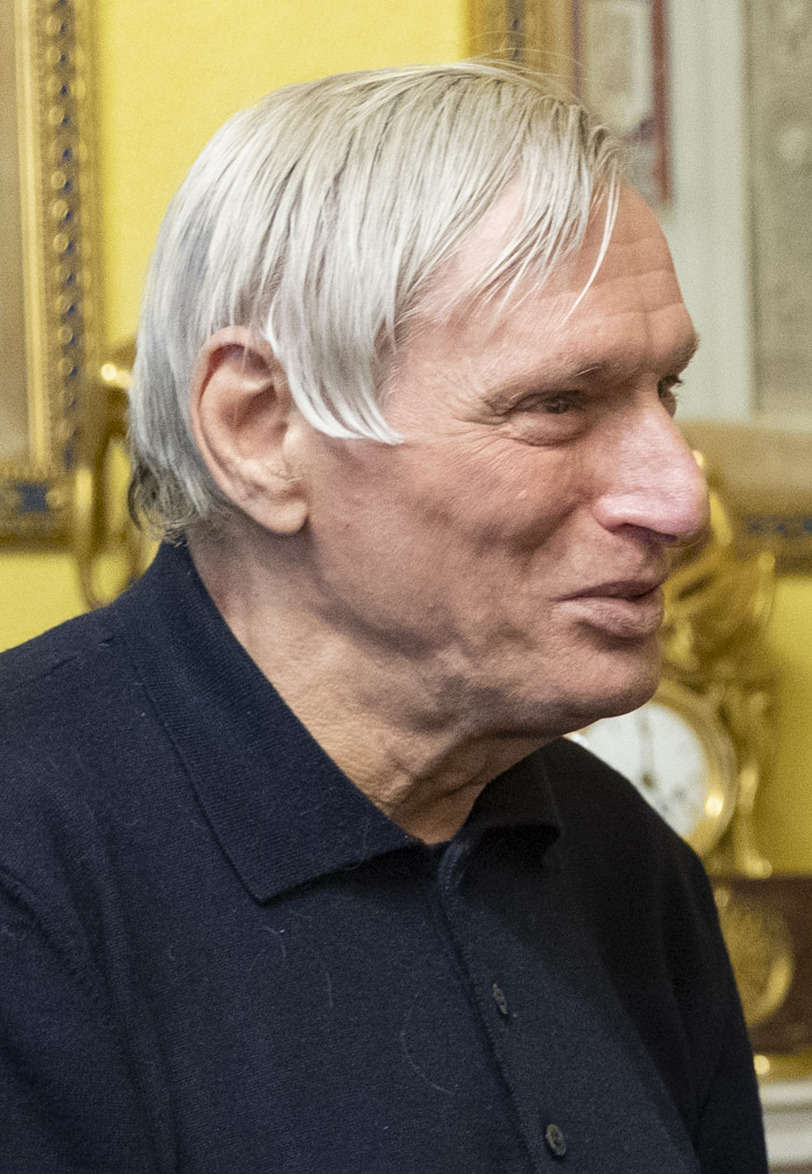
- Ciotti in 2023
- Born: Pio Luigi Ciotti; 10 September 1945 (age 80); Pieve di Cadore, Province of Belluno, Veneto, Kingdom of Italy
- Other names: Don Luigi Ciotti
- Education: Seminary of Rivoli (Turin)
- Occupations: Catholic priest, Social activist, Anti-mafia campaigner
- Religion: Catholicism
- Church: Roman Catholic Church (Archdiocese of Turin)
- Offices held: President of Libera; Founder of Gruppo Abele
- Title: Priest
- Awards: OMRI (1996)

Don Pio Luigi Ciotti OMRI (born 10 September 1945) is an Italian Catholic priest of the Archdiocese of Turin who is involved in the fight against organized crime such as the Sicilian Mafia.

== Biography ==
Born in Pieve di Cadore, in the province of Belluno, on 10 September 1945, Ciotti moved with his family to Turin in 1950. He was ordained priest in 1972 by Cardinal Michele Pellegrino, who assigned him to the parish of the streets of Turin.

Ciotti's involvement with social work started in 1966, when he founded Gruppo Abele (Abel's Group) to follow drug addicts held in Juvenile Detention Centers. In 1982, he founded CNCA, the national network of organizations dedicated to charitable hospitality. In 1987 he was appointed the first president of the Italian League against AIDS (LILA), founded by Franco Grillini and others in 1986. On 25 March 1995 he set up the association Libera (Free), to coordinate efforts by Italian organizations against organized crime.

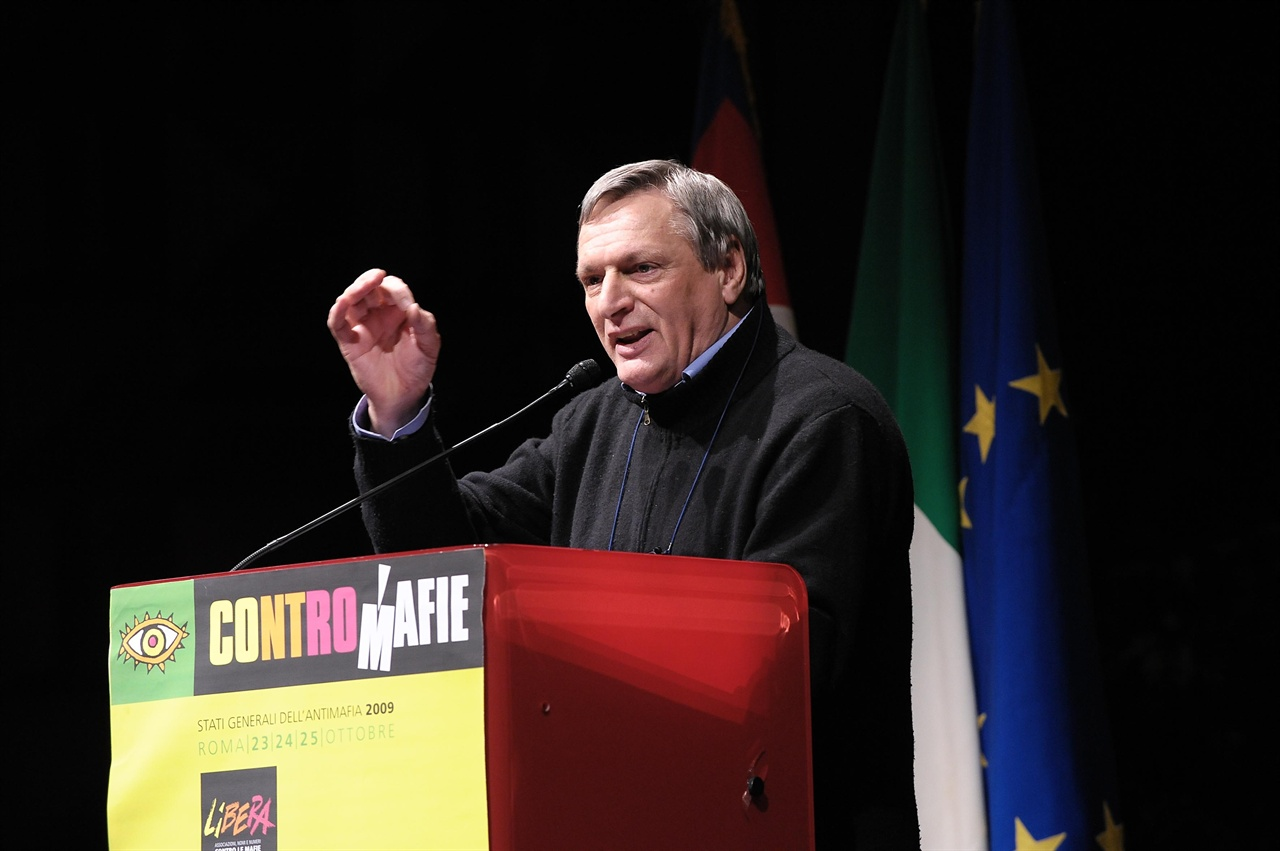
Luigi Ciotti at a meeting of Libera (Free) in 2009

== Publications ==
In 1988 Ciotti started to write for newspapers and specialized magazines dealing with social work and public education. In February 1993 he published the first issue of the monthly magazine Narcomafie (Narcotics Mafias). He has authored several books dealing with educational and social problems, such as Genitori, figli e droga (Parents, Children and Drugs), written in collaboration with Vaccaro, and Chi ha paura delle mele marce? (Who is afraid of Rotten Apples?).

== Honors ==
On 1 July 1998 Ciotti received an Honorary Degree in Education from the University of Bologna. He is a recipient of the Cavaliere di Gran Croce dell'Ordine al Merito della Repubblica Italiana (Cavalier Grand Cross of the Order of Merit) from the President of Italian Republic. On 23 June 2007 he received the "Premio Speciale San Bernardo" (Special Prize St. Bernard) for his endeavors to solve social problems. In 2009, he received the prize "Archivio Disarmo - Golden Doves for Peace" awarded by IRIAD. In November 2024, he was inducted at a conference in Florence into the International Adult Continuing Education Hall of Fame.

== See also ==
- Streetwise priest
