= Rachele Scarpa =

Italian politician (born 1997)

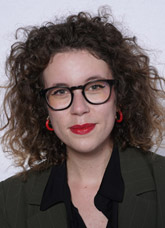
- Scarpa in 2022

Member of the Chamber of Deputies
- Incumbent
- Assumed office 13 October 2022
- Constituency: Veneto 1

Personal details
- Born: 29 January 1997 (age 29) Treviso, Italy
- Party: Democratic Party
- Education: University of Padua

Rachele Scarpa (born 29 January 1997) is an Italian politician of the Democratic Party who was elected member of the Chamber of Deputies in 2022. She was previously parliamentary assistant to MEP Alessandra Moretti and regional coordinator of the Rete degli Studenti Medi.

== Life and career ==
Born on January 29, 1997, in Treviso, where she earned her classical high school diploma with a grade of 89/100 from the Liceo Ginnasio Antonio Canova in 2016, she graduated with a degree in Classical Studies with a grade of 109/110 from the University of Padua in 2021. She served as class representative in high school and as student representative at the university.

She began her political career at the age of 14 with the Rete degli Studenti Medi, where she served as provincial coordinator for Treviso, regional coordinator for Veneto, member of the national executive committee, and Head of Press and Communication. She then moved on to the University Students’ Union and joined the Democratic Party (PD), where she has served as deputy municipal secretary for Treviso since February 2022 and as a member of the Veneto Regional Executive Committee.

In the 2020 regional elections in Veneto, she ran as a candidate for the PD, which endorsed Padua deputy mayor, Arturo Lorenzoni, for president. She received 4,728 votes but was the highest-ranking candidate not elected to the Veneto Regional Council.

From January to August 2022, she served as an assistant to Alessandra Moretti, a Member of the European Parliament from the PD.

In the 2022 early general election, she ran for the Chamber of Deputies as the lead candidate on the Democratic Party – Democratic and Progressive Italy electoral list in the Veneto 1 – 01 multi-member district, and was elected as a deputy. In the 19th legislature, where she is the youngest member of parliament, she serves on the 14th Committee on European Union Policies (2022–2023) and the 2nd Committee on Justice (since 2023), in addition to sponsoring the amendment to the 2023 budget law that reinstates the psychological counseling bonus, allocating €13,000,000 for the 2023–24 biennium as well.

In the 2023 PD primary elections, he supported the motion put forward by Stefano Bonaccini—who had been president of the Emilia-Romagna Region since December 22, 2014—as part of his campaign committee, but was defeated by PD Representative Elly Schlein.
