= Organising Bureau of European School Student Unions =

European student trade union organisation

OBESSU
- Organising Bureau of European School Student Unions
- Founded: April 1975; 51 years ago
- Headquarters: Brussels, Belgium
- Region served: Europe
- Key people: Rui Teixeira, Secretary General, Alessandro Di Miceli, Board Member, Elodie Böhling, Board Member, Ívar Máni Hrannarsson, Board Member, Kacper Bogalecki, Board Member, Lauren Bond, Board Member
- Affiliations: European Youth Forum
- Website: www.obessu.org

The Organising Bureau of European School Student Unions (OBESSU) is the umbrella organization of 37 national school student unions from 28 European countries. An interlocutor with the European Commission, European Parliament, Council of Europe and UNESCO, OBESSU is a full member of the Lifelong Learning Platform (LLLP) and the European Youth Forum (YFJ), and an associate member of the European Students' Union.

== History ==
OBESSU was founded in Dublin, Ireland in April 1975 by national student unions from Sweden, Norway, Finland, Denmark, the United Kingdom and Ireland. The initial aim of the organisation was to create a pan-European school student organisation that could be a platform for cooperation between the national school student unions. By 1980 the platform had added members from Austria, Switzerland, Luxembourg and West Germany and throughout the next decade expanded its membership across Europe. In 1985 OBESSU declared its support for COSAS (the Congress of the South African Students) in their struggle against the apartheid regime.

In 1987, the first international school student meeting was organised in La Havana where representatives of the OBESSU board and many of OBESSU's Member Organisations participated. The same year, representatives from the USSR, Czechoslovakia, Hungary and DDR joined an OBESSU conference in Strasbourg with the aim to establish a more stable contact between the national school student unions in Eastern and Western Europe. In 1995 OBESSU launched a project to support the growth of school student unions in central and Eastern Europe. Since the early nineties national organisations have been established in Slovenia, Slovakia, Macedonia, and Hungary.In 1999 OBESSU launched the UNBASCO project which focused on supporting the stabilisation of school student unions in the Baltic countries, leading to the inclusion of student unions from Estonia and Lithuania.

In April 2005, the 30th Anniversaire Celebrations of the foundation of OBESSU were celebrated in Dublin, Ireland and hosted by the Union of Secondary Students. On 7 December 2011, OBESSU was awarded the 3rd Civil Society Prize during the plenary session of the European Economic and Social Committee for the 'Light on the Rights' Bus Tour project.

== Objectives ==
OBESSU works to:

- represent the school students as stakeholders of their educational systems, and in issues concerning their lives;
- provide the national school student unions with assistance and support and to co-operate for the development of school student representative structures;
- encourage and enable exchange of experience and good practice among the national school students unions;
- promote equal access to education and to strive for the end of all discrimination and injustice within the educational systems;
- contribute to the development of democratic educational systems in Europe, that promote active citizenship in all forms;
- promote solidarity and understanding between young people.

== Structure ==
A General Assembly (GA) serves as the highest decision-making body. The General Assembly meets annually and have authority over the statutes, the political platform and the workplan, as well as electing the Board of OBESSU, the highest decision making body between the GA and Council of Members. The Board is elected annually with overlapping mandates. In this way not all Board members are elected in the same year. The Board consists of 5 members and is responsible for leading and representing the organisation between the General Assemblies.

Between every General Assembly there is a Council of Members (COMEM), which is the second highest decision-making body within OBESSU. The Board and the Secretary General coordinate the daily work of the organisation. OBESSU has a European secretariat based in Brussels. The Secretariat functions as the central coordination and information centre within the organisation. A substantial portion of the preparatory work is conducted at the secretariat, alongside ongoing lobbying efforts directed at European institutions.

== Activities ==
OBESSU fights for the interests of all school students in Europe, represents its Member Organisations towards the relevant bodies and institutions, acts as a coordinating body for national and regional school student organisations, unions and structures in Europe, organises activities for its member organisations and initiates a dialogue with and between stakeholders in education

OBESSU organises approximately 10 conferences per year all dealing with education-related topics. OBESSU also works with its ESU counterparts to promote and coordinate 17 November as International Students' Day.

== Members ==
The Member Organisations and Candidate Organisations of OBESSU are:

Country	Acronym	Full Name	Status
Austria	AKS	Aktion kritischer Schüler_innen	Member
Belgium	CEF	Comité des Élèves Francophones	Member
Belgium	CoSup	Conseil Supérieur des Élèves	Affiliate
Bosnia and Herzegovina	ASuBiH	Asocijacija Srednjoškolaca u Bosni i Hercegovini	Member
Bulgaria	NSP	National Student Parliament of Bulgaria	Candidate
Czech Republic	ČSU	Česká středoškolská unie	Member
Denmark	DGS	Danske Gymnasieelevers Sammenslutning	Member
Denmark	EEO	Erhversskolernes ElevOrganisation	Member
Denmark	LH	Landssammenslutningen af Handelskoleelever	Member
Estonia	ESCU	Eesti Õpilasesinduste Liit	Member
Finland	FSS	Finlands Svenska Skolungdomsförbund	Member
Finland	OSKU	Suomen Opiskelija-Allianssi	Member
France	MNL	Mouvement National Lycéen	Member
Germany	BSK	Bundesschülerkonferenz	Member
Germany	SVB	SV-Bildungswerk e.V.	Affiliate
Hungary	OKÉ	Országos Középiskolás Érdekképviselet	Affiliate
Iceland	SÍF	Samband Íslenskra Framhaldsskólanema	Member
Ireland	ISSU	Irish Second–Level Students' Union	Member
Italy	RSM	Rete degli Studenti Medi	Member
Italy	UdS	Unione degli Studenti	Member
Kosovo	KYC	Kosovar Youth Council	Affiliate
Lithuania	LMS	Lietuvos Moksleivių Sąjunga	Member
Luxembourg	UNEL	Union Nationale des Étudiant-e-s du Luxembourg	Member
Moldova	RNCE	Reţeaua Naţională a Consililor Elevilor	Candidate
Montenegro	UNSCG	Unija srednjoškolaca Crne Gore	Candidate
North Macedonia	UNSHM	National High School Student Union of The Republic of North Macedonia	Member
Romania	CNE	Consiliul Național al Elevilor	Member
Romania	MAKOSZ	Romániai Magyar Középiskolások szövetsége	Member
Serbia	UNSS	Unija Srednjoskolaca Srbije	Member
Slovakia	AS	Aliancia Stredoskolakov	Candidate
Slovakia	SRSS	Študentská Rada Stredných Škôl	Member
Slovenia	DOS	Dijaška Organizacija Slovenije	Member
Spain	CANAE	Confederación Estatal de Asociaciones de Estudiantes	Member
Switzerland	USO / UCE / UCS	Union der Schülerorganisationen	Member
Turkey	TÖS	Türkiye Öğrenci Senatosu	Member
United Kingdom	NSoA	National Society of Apprentices	Member
United Kingdom	SSUNI	Secondary Students' Union of Northern Ireland	Member

== See also ==
- Student voice
- Organizing model
