= Rete degli Studenti Medi =

Students' union in Italy

- High School Students' Network
- Rete degli Studenti Medi
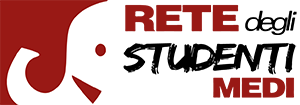
- Banner of Rete degli Studenti Medi
- Abbreviation: RSM
- Founded: 4 October 2008; 18 years ago
- Headquarters: 27, Via Giovanni Battista Morgagni, Rome, Italy
- Coordinates: 41.9102343°N 12.5117375°E
- National Coordinator: Angela Verdecchia
- Affiliations: OBESSU
- Website: retestudenti.it

The Rete degli Studenti Medi (lit. 'High School Students' Network'; RSM) is a national students' union for high school students in Italy. It was founded in 2007 following a split within the Unione degli Studenti (UdS), the oldest student union in the country. The division occurred after the end of the collaboration between UdS and the Italian General Confederation of Labour (CGIL), the largest Italian trade union.

RSM was established through the merger of several groups: the Rete degli Studenti (originally linked to CGIL), Idee Studentesche in Movimento (ISIM), a network that aimed to overcome the split between UdS and RSM, and Studenti di Sinistra (SDS), a student association previously aligned with the Democrats of the Left (DS) party, which later merged into the Italian Democratic Party.

RSM maintains a connection with CGIL and is active on issues related to public education, student representation, and social policies. It operates through local chapters across the country and is a member of the Organising Bureau of European School Student Unions (OBESSU).

== Activities ==
Rete degli Studenti Medi cooperates with UdU, the main Italian University Students'Union and with CGIL, the biggest Italian Trade Union, like UdS did before 2006 and ReDS before 2008. Since 2016, it is a Candidate Association in the OBESSU, and joins International campaigns and assemblies.

It was part of the National movement "L'Onda" (The Wave) against cuts to the Italian education system made by the Berlusconi government and organized rallies in each Italian region, including the national strike promoted with the CGIL, 14 November 2008.

The idea of a new national High School Students'Union was developed at the "Student Free Camp", organized by ReDS and SDS, from 28 July 2008 to 5 August 2008 near Latina, with also the presence of ISIM members.

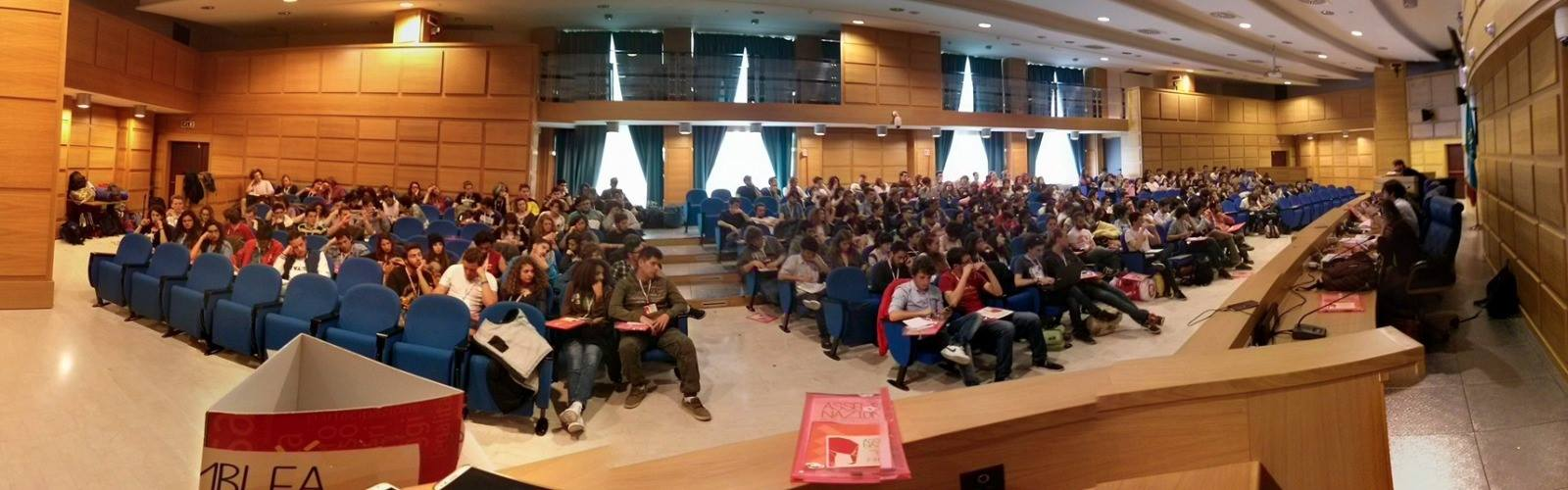
More than 200 students at the Rete degli Studenti Medi General Assembly, Palace of the Region, Rome 2 May 2015.

Rete degli Studenti Medi is part of the National Forum of the Most Representative Students'Associations that cooperates with the Italian Ministry for Education.

The association cooperates with High School Students'Unions from France (the UNL, the UNL-SD and the SGL), from Belgium (the CEF) from Ireland (ISSU) and from Denmark (EEO) that took part to the "Revolution Camp" the National camp of Rete degli Studenti Medi and UdU, in the editions 2016 and 2017 in Massa, Tuscany and Montalto di Castro, Lazio. The FMDL, National French Association of High School Students'centers, was at the Revolution Camp too, as the beginning of a cooperation about services and welfare in Italian and French High Schools. Rete degli Studenti Medi joined the National Assembly and the National Congress of the UNL, respectively, in November 2015 and April 2016, and participated in the General Assembly of the OBESSU in Amsterdam, the 11 and 12 August 2016, starting the cooperation with other European Students'associations. For the first time as a Candidate Association, RSM had official delegates at the OBESSU Council of Members of December 2016 in Dublin, Ireland, and at the OBESSU General Assembly 2017 in Berlin, Germany.

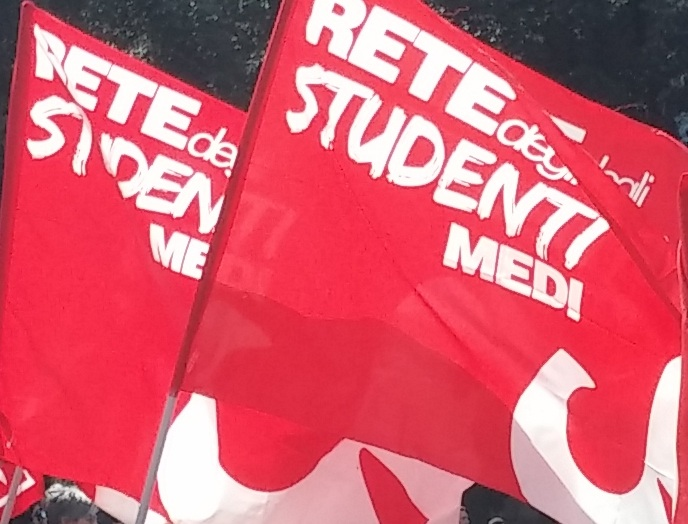
Flags of Rete degli Studenti Medi

RSM is an official Member of OBESSU since the International Students'Day 2017, day of the Council of Members of Prague in which RSM Membership was approved by the other member school student unions.

Rete degli Studenti Medi gave its solidarity to Danish student unions after a call of DGS (the General High School student union) against the university reform of 2017, and to Colombian students of ANDES part of the peace process at the end of the civil war between FARC and the Government of Colombia.

It organizes each year rallies and cultural events to celebrate 17 November, the International Student Day, joining international political platforms from the OBESSU and from ESU.

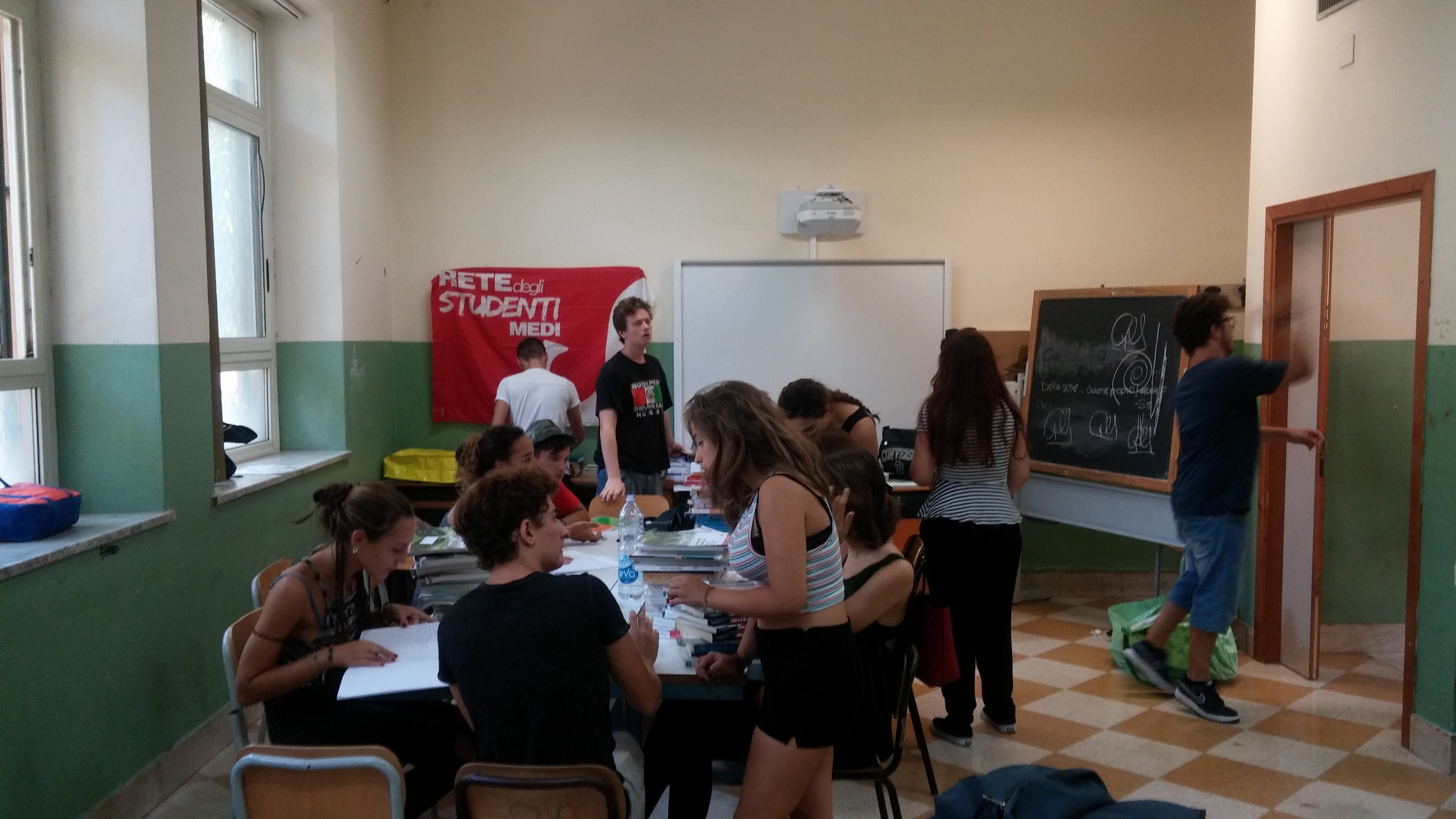
Second-hand school books market of Rete degli Studenti Medi, August 2016, Palermo, Sicily .

The association promotes in many Italian cities the "Second Hand School Book Market", an event that takes place in schools and in cultural centers, to allow Italian students to buy school books spending less, because the price of school books in Italy is considered too high and it has negative effects on the inclusion of many students.

21 May, the association joins the "Day of Memory and Commitment to commemorate all victims of Mafias", with national rallies, for example in Bologna (Emilia Romagna) in 2015, in Messina (Sicily) in 2016, and Locri (Calabria) in 2017 and demonstrations organised by Libera in different Italian cities.

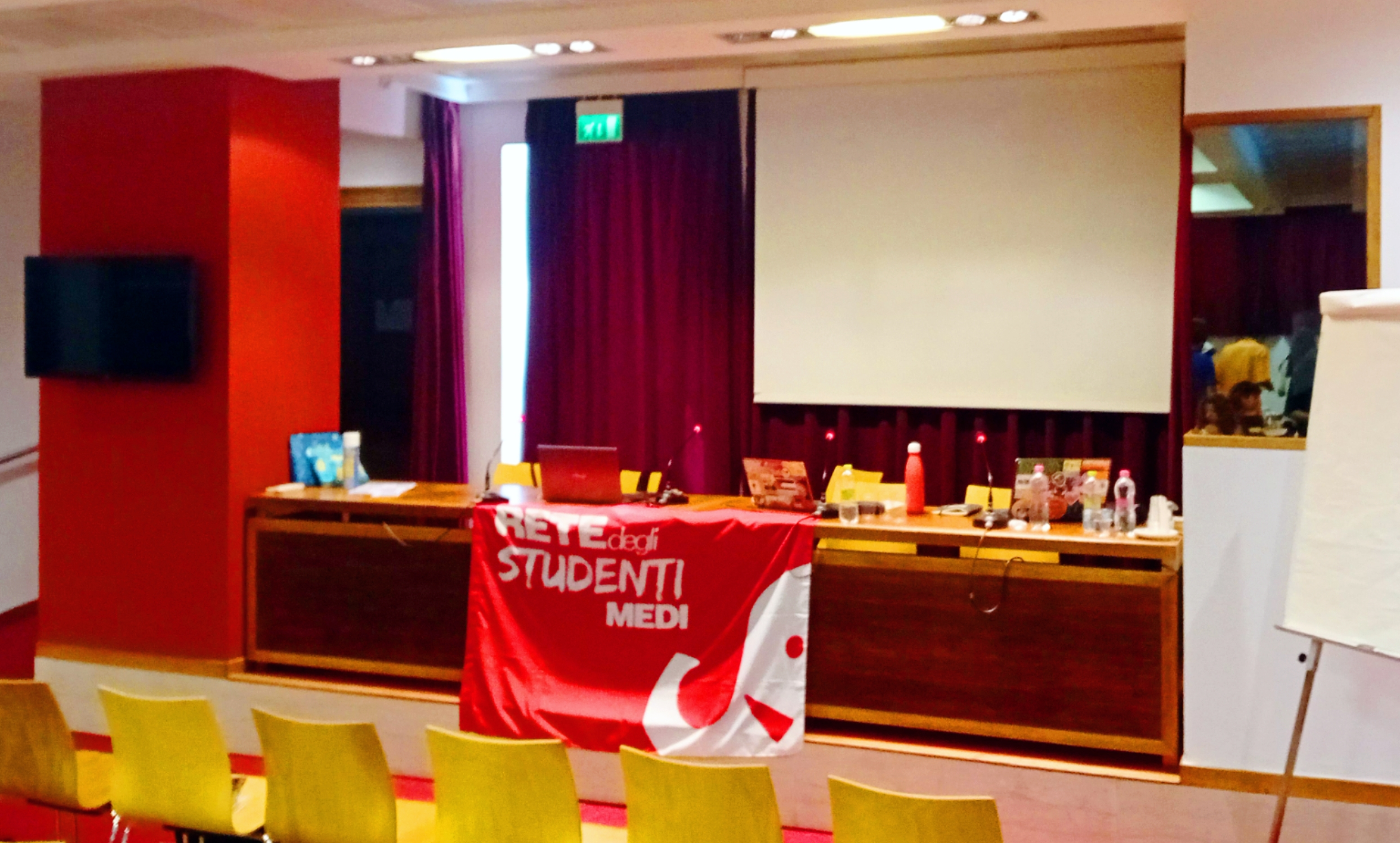
Regional Congress of Rete degli Studenti Medi in Marche, Italy, July 2024

Rete degli Studenti Medi, with Arci, Libera, CGIL and UdU organizes the "Campi della Legalità" summer camps in nine Italian regions where volunteers can work on lands that were properties of mafia families, which now are controlled by the State and administrated by these associations. Volunteers can visit places linked with the fight against the Mafia and they also learn about history of the anti-mafia movement with the help of people that are directly involved.

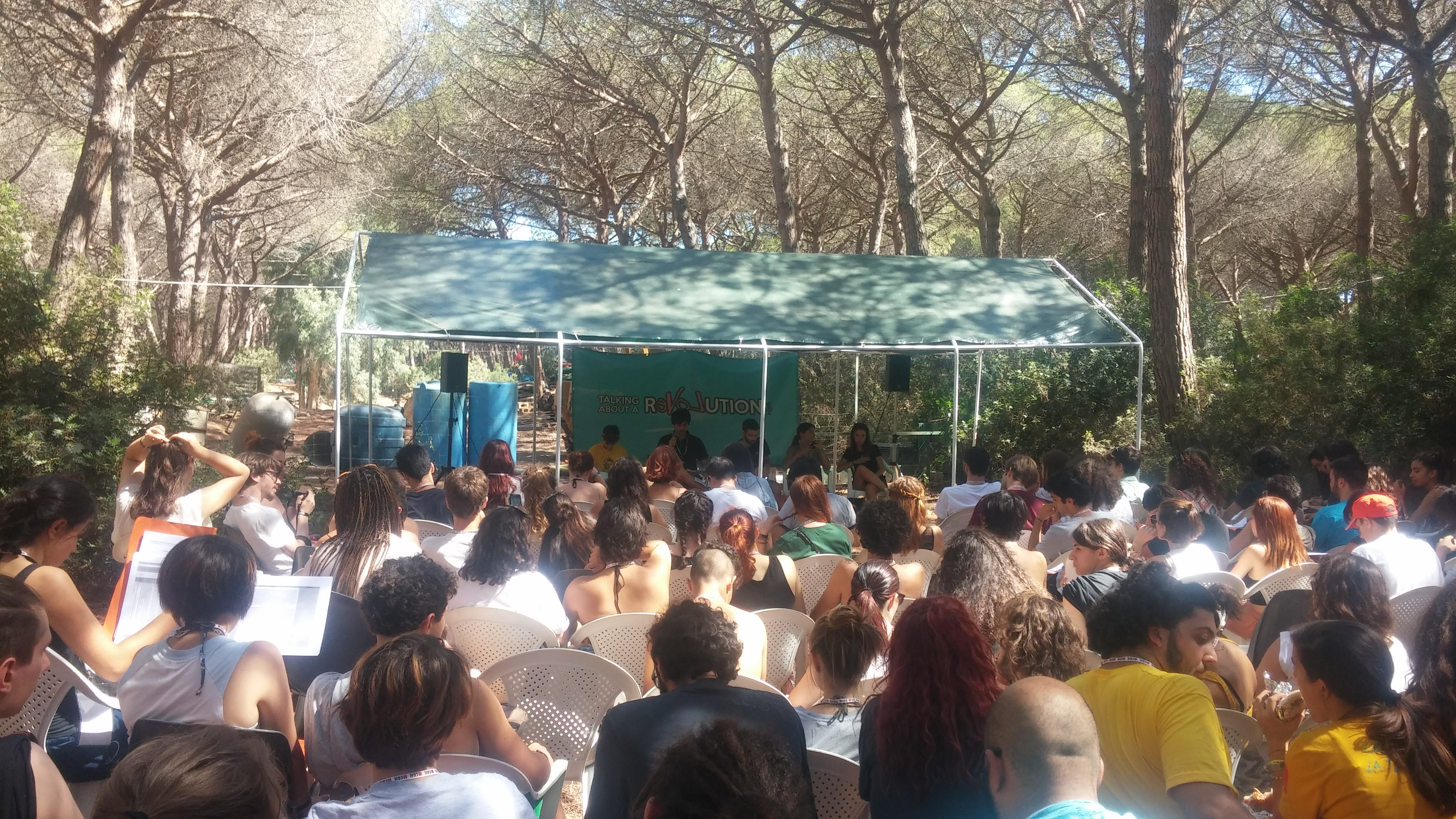
National Assembly of RSM: "There's a time for us: this", Montalto di Castro (Viterbo) July 2017

At a local and regional level, Rete degli Studenti Medi edits several School Students'Magazines, in particular "Il Mancino" is published in Veneto and Friuli-Venezia Giulia, "Panoptes" in Umbria and "Senza Filtro" in Emilia Romagna.

Some of RSM Provincial Confederations organize cultural activities cooperating with Arci, the biggest Italian cultural association, and there are also Circoli Arci (local Arci clubs) directly supported by RSM members, like in Treviso, and Caltanissetta. Similar activities are organized with UdU, CGIL and ANPI.

After the Revolution Camp 2018 the National Board members are: Giammarco Manfreda (Coordinator, from Tuscany), Giulia Titoli (from Umbria), Elena Turchi (from Emilia Romagna), Rachele Scarpa (from Veneto), Francesco Boscheri (from Lazio) and Federico Allegretti (from Sicily). Rachele Scarpa is also the International Officer of the Organization, representing it officially in front of organizations from other countries and in the OBESSU.

It is a democratic Students' Union that fights for students' rights and in favour of public secondary education for all Italian citizens. Rete degli Studenti Medi defends the values of the Italian Constitution, it is against each form of discrimination, racism, fascism and fanaticism. It is not affiliated with political parties, but could be considered a leftist progressive Students' union.

== Structure ==
The network, inspired by trade unions, structures its presence at regional and provincial bases respectively.

The association has a national executive in order to coordinate the work of the territorial structures. The provincial and regional coordinators meet in the National Coordination twice a year to arrange their political discourse.

The existing regional bases are in Basilicata, Emilia-Romagna, Lazio, Liguria, Marche, Sicily, Umbria and Veneto. In certain regions, RdSM is present with provincial bases without a regional coordination.

=== Territorial structure ===
Marche
Province		Name	Logo	Spokesperson	Ref
Ancona	Jesi	Rete Studenti Jesi		Meriem Aloui	
Ascoli Piceno
Ascoli Piceno	Ascoli Piceno	La Fenice		Lucia Rozzi	
Ascoli Piceno	San Benedetto del Tronto	Robinhood		Lorenza Prado	
Fermo		Noisette		Emanuele Fenni	
Macerata		La Ginestra		Margherita Paolucci	
Pesaro and Urbino		Gazza Ladra		Marta Mongardini	

== National Spokesperson and Coordinator ==
Year	Office Holder	Ref.
2008–2010	Luca De Zolt	
2010–2012	Sofia Sabatino	
2012–2014	Daniele Lanni	
2014–2016	Alberto Irone	
2016–2019	Giammarco Manfreda	
2019–2021	Federico Allegretti	
2021–2022	Tommaso Biancuzzi	
2022–2025	Paolo Notarnicola	
2025–present	Angela Verdecchia	

== See also ==
- Organising Bureau of European School Student Unions
- CGIL
- Arci
