= Irish Second–Level Students' Union =

Irish student representation body

Irish Second-Level Students' Union (ISSU) Aontas Daltaí Iar-bhunscoile na hÉireann (ADIÉ)
- President: Preston Ó Caoimh
- Vice President: Billy Campbell
- Founded: August 2008
- Preceded by: Union of Secondary Students
- International affiliation: OBESSU
- Website: www.issu.ie

The Irish Second–Level Students' Union (ISSU) is Ireland's national umbrella body for second-level students working through the student council network in second-level schools. ISSU represents post-primary school students nationwide.

ISSU's stated aims include to be "a voice for students", to end "discrimination and injustice within the Irish education system", to "empower student councils to take action", to address "disparity in student services based on socio-economic backgrounds" and to "address students' challenges and concerns".

ISSU was founded in August 2008, from the remains of the Union of Secondary Students (USS) which had been in existence from 2001 to 2008. It is a member of the Organising Bureau of European School Student Unions (OBESSU) and the National Youth Council of Ireland.

During September 2009, ISSU modified its name from the Irish Secondary Students' Union to the Irish Second–Level Students' Union to encompass all Irish post-primary schools.

Students in Northern Ireland are represented by the Secondary Students' Union of Northern Ireland (SSUNI).

In the 2020s, the union campaigned for a lowering of the voting age to 16, Leaving Certificate curriculum diversity, the need to tackle incel culture, and has voiced concerns regarding restrictions on mobile phone use in schools.
