= Libera (association) =

Italian association against mafias

Libera. Associazioni, nomi e numeri contro le mafie
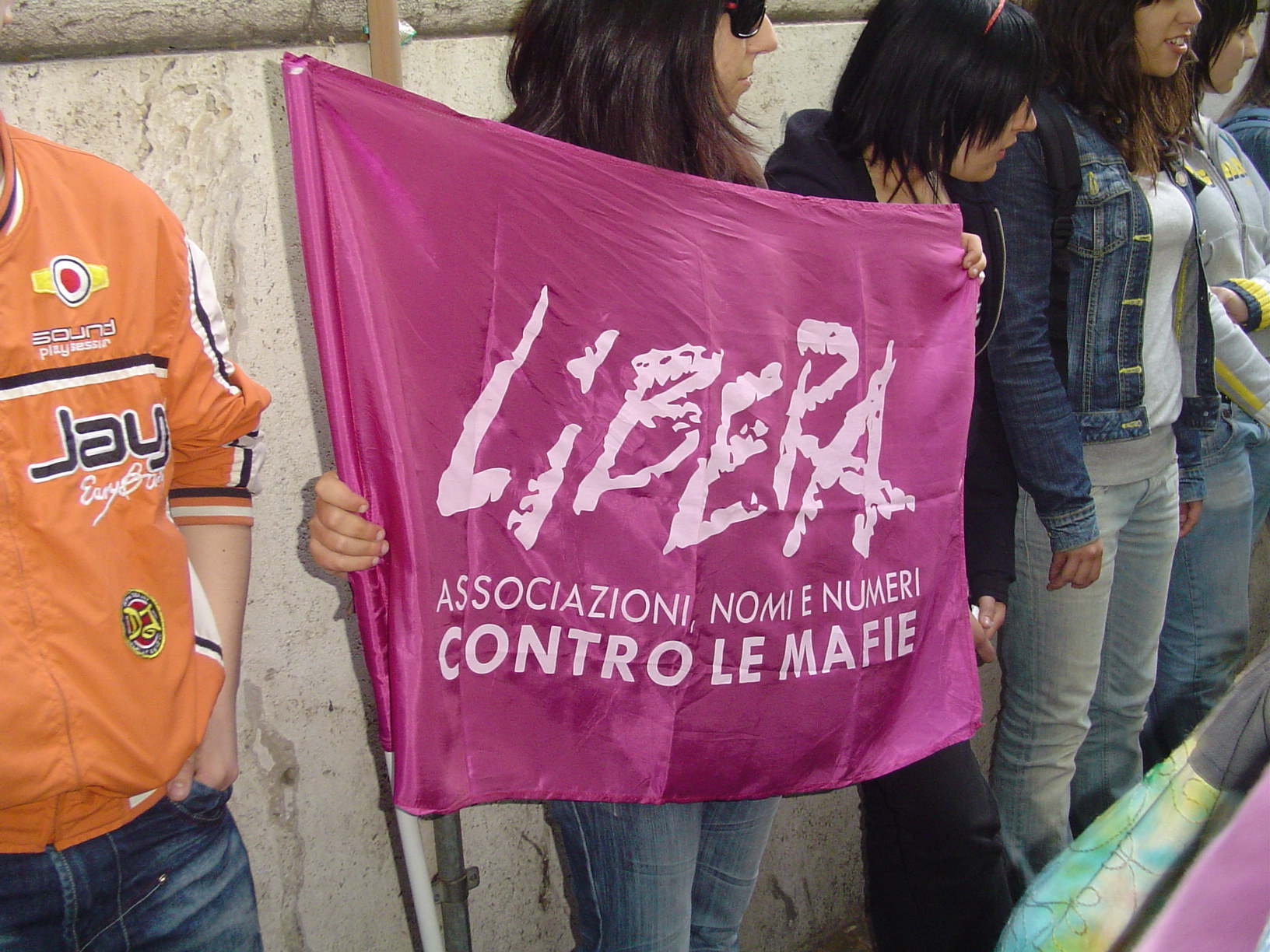
- Flag with the logo of Libera
- Abbreviation: Libera
- Formation: 25 March 1995
- Founders: Luigi Ciotti
- Type: Non-governmental organization
- Purpose: promote legality to fight organized crime
- Headquarters: Rome, Italy
- Region served: Worldwide

Lìbera. Associazioni, nomi e numeri contro le mafie (lit. 'Free: Associations, Names, and Numbers Against Mafias') is an Italian association that promotes outreach and protest against the Mafia, Italian organized crime, and organized crime in general. Libera is a non governmental association for social promotion (in Italian: Associazione di promozione sociale), recognized by the Italian Ministry of the Interior. Since its foundation, Libera has coordinated social activities against organized crime while encouraging the creation and the development of alternative local communities in areas where the Mafia is strong.

Libera coordinates between associations and companies that join its coalition. In 2011, 1,500 associations, foundations or corporations were members of the group. With Associazione Ricreativa e Culturale Italiana, the Italian General Confederation of Labour, Rete degli Studenti Medi, and Unione degli Universitari organizes the "Campi della Legalità" summer camps in different Italian regions where volunteers work on lands that were properties of Mafia families, which now are controlled by the state and administrated by these associations. Volunteers can visit places linked with the fight against the Mafia and learn about history of the anti-Mafia movement with the help of people directly involved.

== History ==
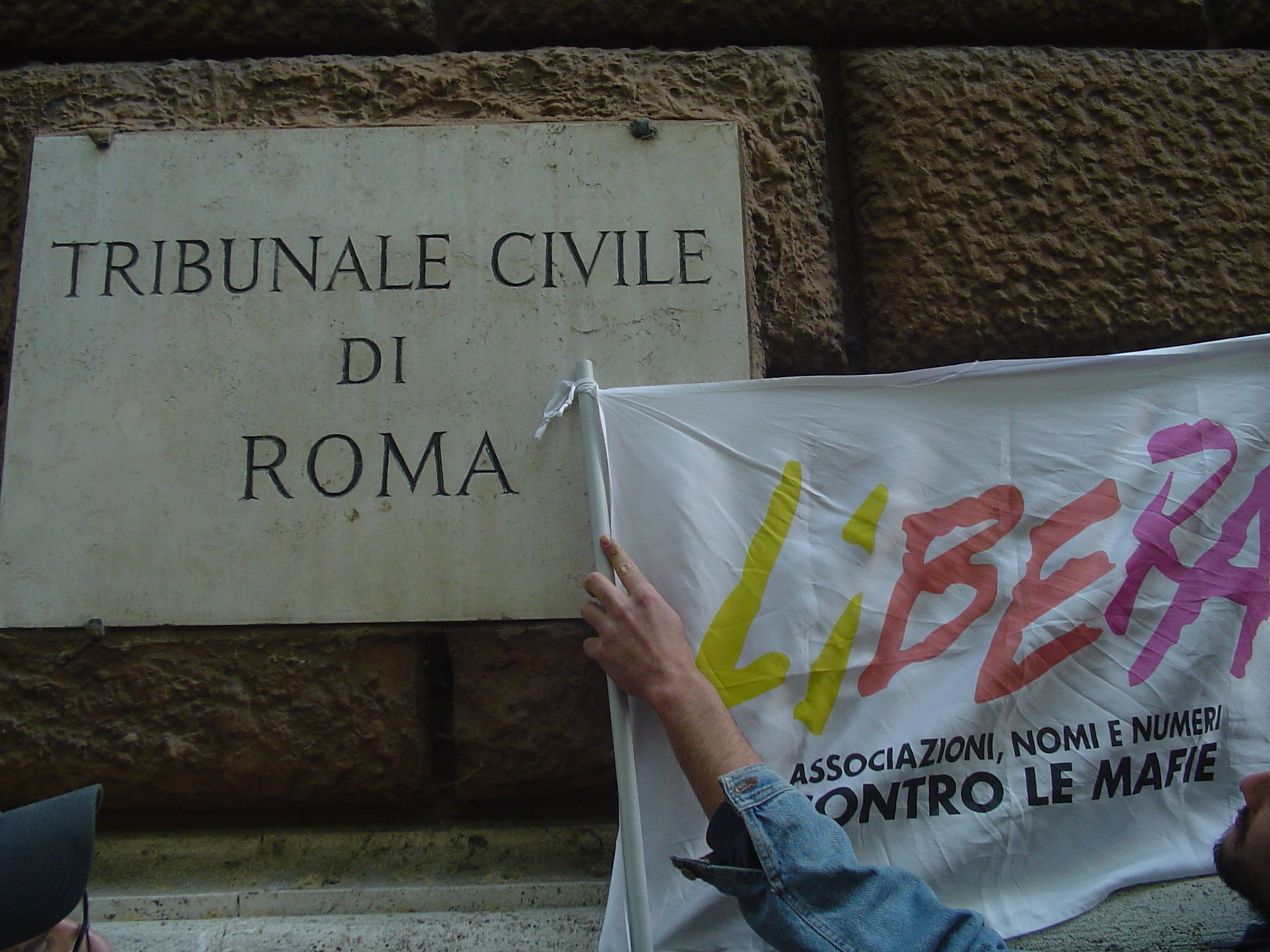
A protest by Libera in Rome in 2007

Libera was founded on 25 March 1995 by Luigi Ciotti with the intent of promoting legal activities against Mafia. The first action of Libera was the collection of one million signatures with purpose of a law proposal to permit the reusing of the goods confiscated from crime organizations and this was successfully made true on 7 March 1996.

Libera is recognized with the Special Consultative Status by the United Nations Economic and Social Council. In 2009, Libera was awarded by European Economic and Social Committee. In 2012 was included in the list of the hundred best NGOs in the world by The Global Journal and was the only Italian association included. Since 1996, Libera has organized the "Carovana Antimafie" with the main Italian trade unions (CGIL, CISL, and UIL) and with ARCI, during which it holds events about the fight against the Mafia in cities internationally.

== President ==
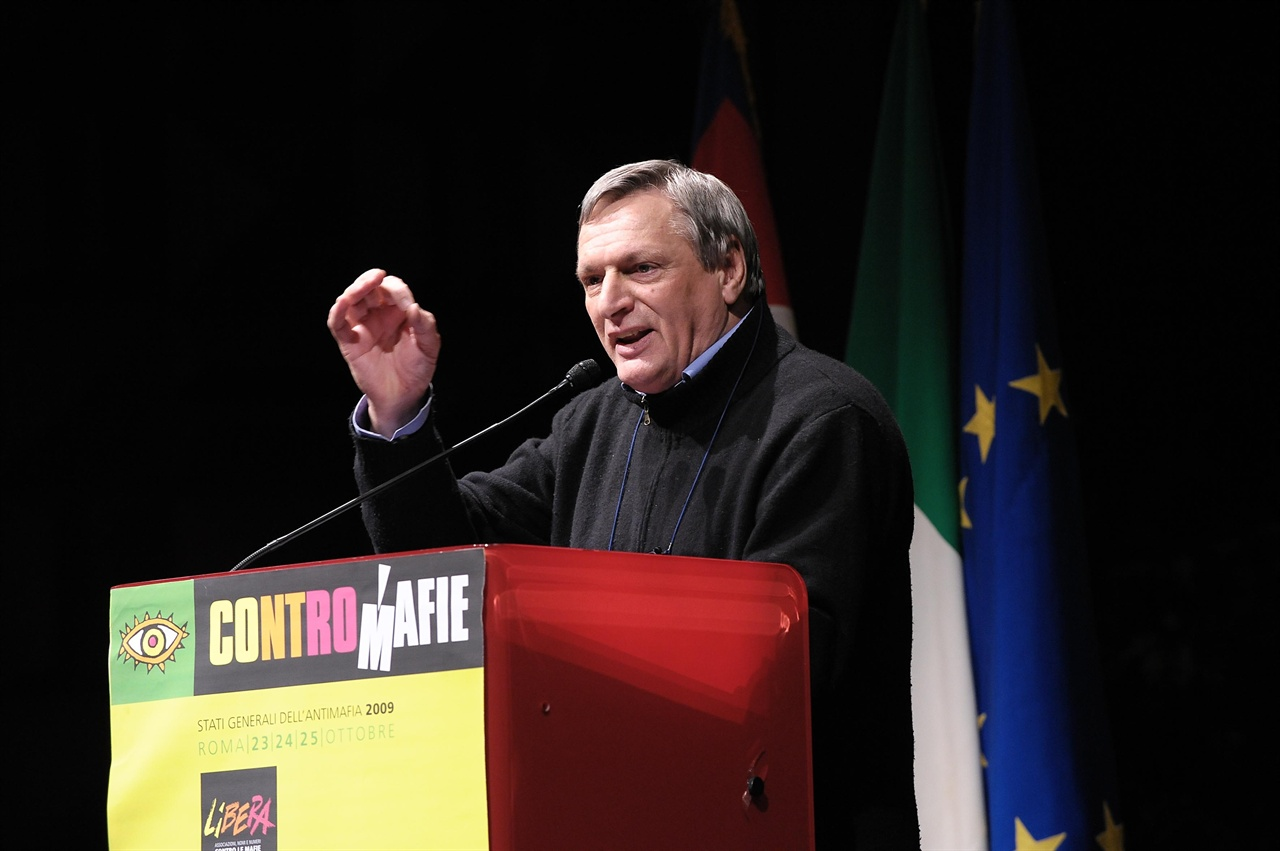
Luigi Ciotti speaking at a meeting of Libera in 2009

The founder Luigi Ciotti is the president of Libera along with Nando dalla Chiesa, a sociology professor at the University of Milan, elected president honoris causa of the anti-mafia organisation. Nando dalla Chiesa was chosen because he has been active against mafia ever since his father, Carlo Alberto Dalla Chiesa, an Italian general notable for campaigning against terrorism during the 1970s was assassinated by the Mafia in Palermo in 1982.

== Activities ==
Libera's cooperatives produce various products using goods and lands confiscated from Mafia organizations or families across Italy by applying Italian law 109/1996, which permits certain organizations to reuse goods confiscated from the mafia. The organization's stated aim is to promote an economy that respects to workers' rights, the environment and the law, and restoring the value of activities that were abandoned due to fear of the mafia.

=== Libera Terra ===
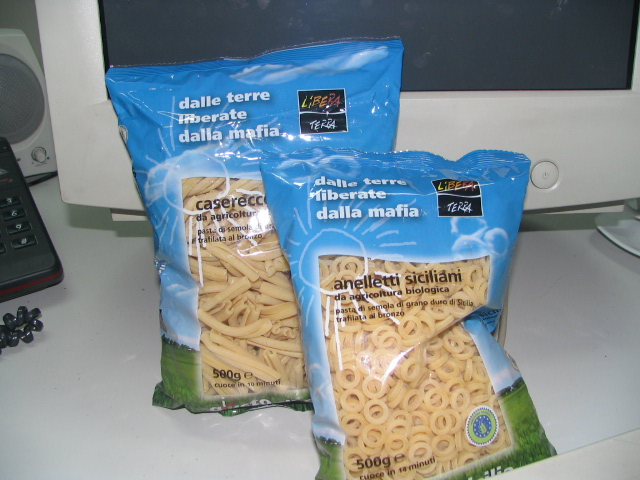
An example of products made by Terra Libera

Libera Terra is a trademark used by the cooperatives that are part of the Libera project. This trademark distinguish products made by cooperatives that use directly goods or lands taken from mafia for the production of its products. Nine cooperatives utilizing the trademark created the consortium Consorzio Libera Terra Mediterraneo which promotes of land reuse, by supporting responsible tourism.

=== Estate Liberi! ===
Through the Estate Liberi program students participate Libera's work, through volunteer work and trainings managed by social cooperatives that are part of Libera Terra.
