= Associazione Ricreativa e Culturale Italiana =

Arci
- Italian Recreational and Cultural Association
- Associazione Ricreativa e Culturale Italiana
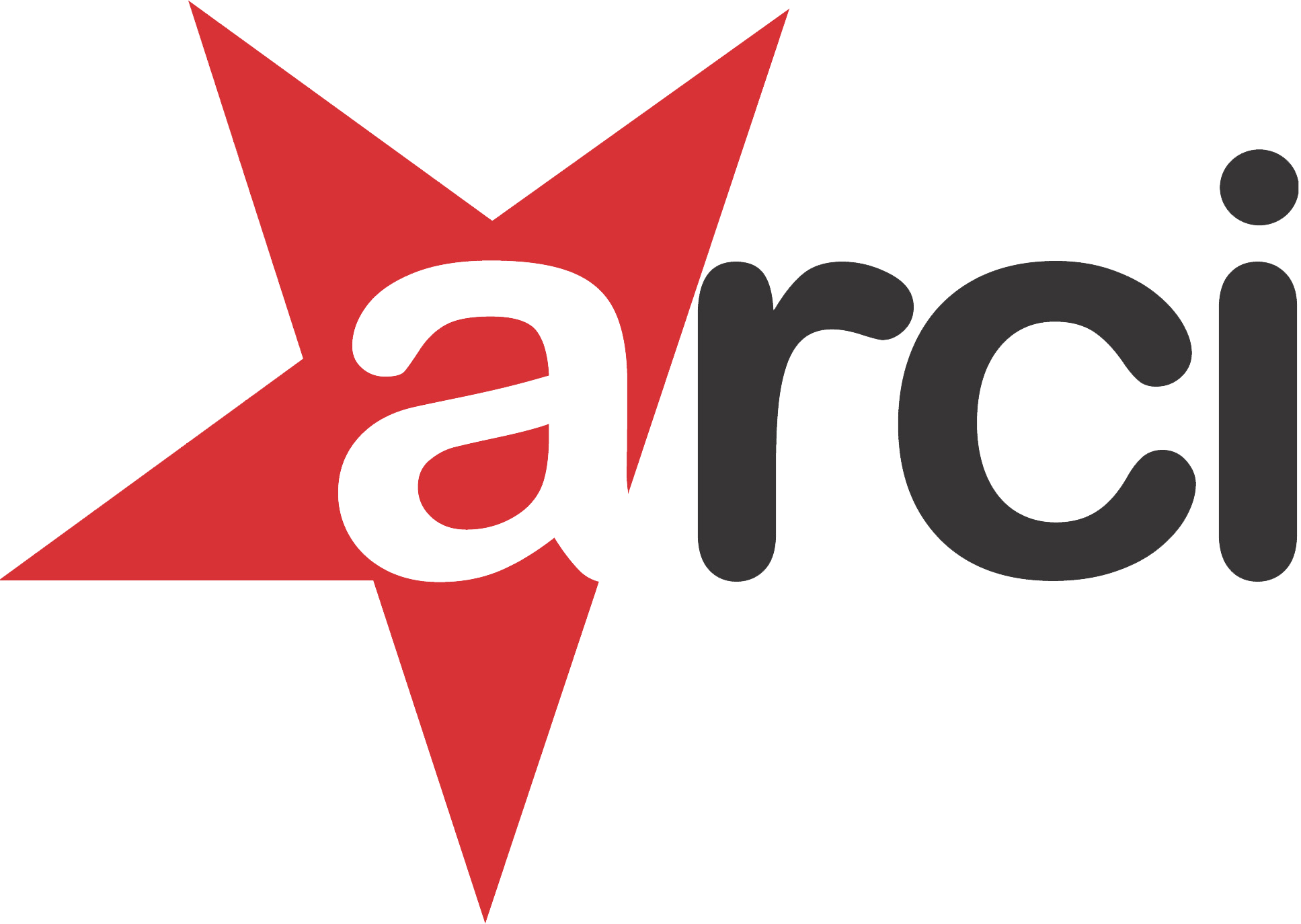
- Abbreviation: ARCI
- Founded: 1957
- Headquarters: Rome, Italy
- Location: Italy
- Members: 1,088,451
- Key people: Daniele Lorenzi (National President)
- Website: arci.it

Associazione Ricreativa Culturale Italiana (ARCI) is the biggest Italian non-profit association not linked with the Catholic Church. As of 2016, it has 4,796 cultural centers and a million members in all Italian regions.

Since 1996, with the main Italian trade unions (CGIL, CISL, and UIL) and with Libera organizes the Carovana Antimafie (lit. 'Anti-Mafia Caravan'), an international project which during a long trip includes events about the fight against mafias in different cities. The project started in 1994 less than two years after the murder of Giovanni Falcone and Paolo Borsellino, with a ten days march from Capaci (near Palermo) to Licata, Sicily.

With Libera, CGIL, Rete degli Studenti Medi, and UdU, it organizes the "Campi della Legalità" summer camps in different Italian towns (like Corleone) where volunteers can work on lands that were property of Sicilian Mafia families, which now are controlled by the state and administrated by these associations. Volunteers can visit places linked with the fight against mafia and they also learn about history of the anti-mafia movement with the help of people that are directly involved.

== National President ==
- Alberto Jacometti (1957–1971)
- Arrigo Morandi (1971–1979)
- Enrico Menduni (1979–1983)
- Rino Serri (1983–1989)
- Giampiero Rasimelli (1989–1997)
- Tom Benetollo (1997–2004)
- Paolo Beni (2004–2014)
- Francesca Chiavacci (2014–2021)
- Daniele Lorenzi (2021–)
