= Union of Land, Food and Forests =

The Union of Land, Food and Forests (German: Gewerkschaft der Land, Lebensmittelgüter und Forst) was a trade union representing workers in various related industries in East Germany.

The union was founded in 1946, as the Industrial Union of Agriculture and Forestry, and in June it became part of the new Free German Trade Union Federation (FDGB), by which point it already had 167,065 members. In 1949, it was a founding affiliate of the Trade Union International of Agricultural and Forestry Workers. In 1950, it changed its name to the Union of Land and Forests, to better reflect its membership.

The scope of the union gradually increased. In 1960, employees of food purchasing businesses were transferred from the Union of Trade, Food and Enjoyment, followed in 1964 by workers in feed mixing plants, and in 1968 by all remaining workers in food manufacturing and processing. As a result, that year, it changed its name to the "Union of Land, Food and Forests". In 1964, the union also took in workers in veterinary medicine from the Union of Healthcare, and in 1967 those in rural building organisations, from the Industrial Union of Building and Wood.

The union was also involved in sports associations, their names starting with "SV Traktor".

The union's membership increased steadily, and by 1989, it was 654,815. In March 1990, it became independent, and in June, it transferred relevant members to the new Food, Beverages and Catering Union of the DDR. It discussed a possible merger with the West German Horticulture, Agriculture and Forestry Union (GGLF), and decided to dissolve on 30 September 1990, its remaining members transferring to the GGLF.

== Presidents ==
1946: Willi Hübner
1947: Willi Wolf
1948: Willi Beuster
1949: Anton Jadasch
1950: Florian Schenk
1953: Karl Svihalek
1961: Horst Reinhardt
1962: Fritz Müller
1984: Horst Zimmermann
1989: Marianne Sandig
