= Trade Union International of Workers in Commerce =

The Trade Union International of Workers in Commerce was a trade union international affiliated with the World Federation of Trade Unions.

== History ==
The union was formed in 1959.

In 1997 it merged with the Trade Union International of Agricultural, Forestry and Plantation Workers, Trade Union International of Food, Tobacco, Hotel and Allied Industries Workers, and Trade Union International of Textile, Leather and Fur Workers Unions to form the Trade Union International of Agroalimentary, Food, Commerce, Textile & Allied Industries.

== Organization ==
The highest organ in the union was the international conference. Then there was the administrative committee and the secretariat.

In 1978 its address was listed as Opletova 57 Prague, 1 an address it would keep until at least 1991.

== Membership ==
When the TUI began it had 22 affiliated unions. At its 1976 conference it claimed 14,862,279 members in 50 affiliated unions in 44 countries. By the mid 1980s it had 70 members organizations in 61 countries representing 20 million members

In 1978 the following organizations were affiliated to the TUI:

- Albania - Union Professionelle du Commerce d'Albania
- Austria - Left Bloc of the Union of Private Sector Employees
- Benin - Travailleurs du Commerce de l'Industrie et Assimiles
- Bulgaria - Fédération des Travailleurs du Commerce
- Cameroon - Union Nationale des Syndicats des Travailleurs du Commerce et Assimiles de la RF du Cameroun
- Chile - Confederación de Empleados Particulares de Chile
- China - Syndicat des Travailleurs du Commerce
- Colombia - Federación Nacional de Trabajadores de Venta, Industia, Commercio y Cooperatives
- Congo - Fédération Syndicale des Travailleurs du Commerce
- Cuba - Sindicato Nacional de Trabajadores del Commercio
- Cyprus - Cyprus Commercial and Industrial Workers Union
- Czechoslovakia - Comite Centrale Syndicat des Travailleurs du Commerce
- El Salvador - Sindicato Nacional de Empleados Particulares
- France - Commerce, Services and Distribution Federation, CGT
- France - Fédération Nationale des Syndicats des Confederes des Voyageurs, Representants, Placiers, CGT
- Guadeloupe - Syndicat professionnel des Employes de Commerce, CGT
- East Germany - Union of Trade
- Guyana - Guyana Public Service and General Workers Union
- Honduras - Sindicato de Trabajadores de Casas Commerciales y Afines
- Hungary - Fédération des Travailleurs des Travailleurs des Finances et de l'Industrie Hotelier
- India - All India Lipton Employees Union
- India - Bengal Motion Pictures Employees Union
- Iraq - General Union of Workers, General Service and Social Affairs
- Italy - Italian Federation of Commerce, Hotel and Service Workers
- Jordan - General Federation of Jordanian Trade Unions, Commerce (in exile)
- North Korea - Syndicats des Travailleurs du Commerce
- Madagascar - Fédération des Syndicats des Travailleurs du Commerce et Professions Similares
- Mali - Syndicat National du Commerce, des Banques du Credits et des Assurances
- Mauritius - Shop and Commercial Workers Union
- Mongolia - Comite Central des Syndicats des Travailleurs du Transport, du Commerce et de Services Publics
- Nigeria - Co-operative Inspectorate Staff and Co-operative Workers Union
- Nigeria - UTC African Workers Union
- Palestine - Palestine Trade Union Federation (in exile)
- Panama - Union de Empleados de Comercio
- Panama - Sindicato de Agentes Vendedadores, Cabradores y Similares de la Republica de Panama
- Peru - Federación Nacional de Trabajadores de Comercio de Lima, Callao y Balnearios
- Peru - Federacion Nacional de Trabajadores en Mercados
- Poland - Fédération des Travailleurs du Commerce d'Etat et des Cooperatives
- Romania - Union des Travailleurs du Commerce et des Cooperatives de Consomation
- Sierra Leone - Transport, Agriculture and General Workers' Union
- Somalia - Commercial and Allied Workers Union
- Soviet Union - Fédération des Travailleurs du Commerce d'Etat et des Cooperatives de Consomation
- Sri Lanka - United Tea, Rubber, Local Produce Workers' Union
- Sri Lanka - All Ceylon CWE Store Managers and Store Assistants Union
- Syria - Professional Federation of Public Service Workers
- Tanzania - National Union of Tanganyika Workers
- Uruguay - Federacion Uruguaya de Empleados de Comercio y Industrias
- Venezuela - Sindicatos de Trabajadores de Comercio, (CUTV)
- Vietnam - Syndicat National des Travailleurs du Commerce
- South Yemen - General Union of Banks, Trading and Insurance Workers

== Publications ==
The TUI published News monthly and Bulletin quarterly in English, French, Spanish, German and Russian.

== Leadership ==
=== General Secretaries ===
1959: Domenico Banchieri
1964: Dumitru Usturoi
Ilie Frunza
1980s: Alvaro Villamarin

=== Presidents ===
1959: Marie Radova
1964: Carrere
Janos Vas
