= Union of Academic Research =

The Union of Academic Research (German: Gewerkschaft Wissenschaft, Gew. W) was a trade union representing university and college staff and those in related jobs in East Germany.

The union was founded by the Free German Trade Union Federation (FDGB) in 1953, following requests from several universities for a dedicated union. It initially had 41,000 members. In 1961, the Union of Healthcare was founded, but the university medicine section of the union successfully argued against transferring to the new organisation. In 1977, workers in archives, independent research institutions, and the Foreign Languages Service were moved to other unions.

Internationally, the union affiliated to the World Federation of Scientific Workers. The union became involved in sports associations, their names starting with "SV Wissenschaft".

By 1989, the union had grown to have 184,222 members. It became independent in January 1990. In negotiations with West German unions, it argued that all research workers should remain organised in one union. This position was not accepted, so when in October the union dissolved, its members could choose to join either the Education and Science Workers' Union or the Public Services, Transport and Traffic Union.

== Presidents ==
1953: Günther Rienäcker
1959: Alfred Wende
1963: Günter Ehmke
1968: Gerhard Junghähnel
1972: Horst Sander
1982: Rolf Rinke
1990: Günter Eiselt
