= Trade Union International of Food, Tobacco, Hotel and Allied Industries Workers =

The Trade Union International of Food, Tobacco, Hotel and Allied Industries Workers was a trade union international affiliated with the World Federation of Trade Unions.

== History ==
The union was founded in 1949 at a conference in Sofia, Bulgaria. Its original name was the Trade Union International of Food, Tobacco and Beverage Industries, and Hotel, Cafe and Restaurant Workers.

In 1997 the Trade Union International of Agroalimentary, Food, Commerce, Textile & Allied Industries was formed by the merger of the Trade Union International of Agricultural, Forestry and Plantation Workers, Trade Union International of Food, Tobacco, Hotel and Allied Industries Workers, Trade Union International of Workers in Commerce, Trade Union International of Textile, Leather and Fur Workers Unions.

== Organization ==
The TUI was organized with a Congress, directing committee and permanent secretariat. Its headquarters is listed as Positano Street #8, Sofia in early accounts, but was relocated to #4 September 6, Sofia from 1978 until the early 1990s when it was reported at Stamboliyski 3.

== Leadership ==
=== General Secretaries ===
1949: Anton Ditchev
c.1960: Elio Moya
Sacho Ivanov
Francisco Castillo
1980s: Luis Martell Rosa

=== Presidents ===
1949: Maurice Simonin
1956: Vincenzo Ansanelli
1979: Andre Nogier
1980s: Bertrand Page
