= Trade Union International of Agricultural, Forestry and Plantation Workers =

International trade union

- Abbreviation: TUIAFPW
- Successor: Trade Union International of Agroalimentary, Food, Commerce, Textile & Allied Industries
- Formation: 1949
- Dissolved: 1997
- Legal status: Peasant Organization
- Members: 40 countries
- First Secretary: Ilio Bosi
- First President: Suleiman Tjugito
- Parent organization: World Federation of Trade Unions

The Trade Union International of Agricultural, Forestry and Plantation Workers (Russian: Международный профсоюз работников сельского хозяйства, лесного хозяйства и плантаций; 1949 – 1997) was a trade union international affiliated with the World Federation of Trade Unions.

== History ==
The TUI was founded at a conference in Warsaw, Poland in December 1949. Its original name was the Trade Union International of Agricultural and Forestry Workers.

In 1997 the Trade Union International of Agroalimentary, Food, Commerce, Textile & Allied Industries was formed by the merger of the Trade Union International of Agricultural, Forestry and Plantation Workers, Trade Union International of Food, Tobacco, Hotel and Allied Industries Workers, Trade Union International of Workers in Commerce and Trade Union International of Textile, Leather and Fur Workers Unions.

== Organization ==
By 1985 the TUI had branch commissions representing workers in agriculture, plantations, the forestry industry and peasant workers.

In 1955 the headquarters of the organization was located at 19 Via Boncampagni, Rome. In 1985, its address was reported as Opletalova 57 Prague 1, Czechoslovakia. However, by 1989 it had moved to Serpoukhovkaia 44, 113093 Moscow where it stayed until at least 1991.

=== Conferences ===
- 1st Warsaw, December 1949 - attended by delegates from the Soviet Union, China, East Germany, Italy, Bulgaria, Czechoslovakia, Hungary, Poland and Romania representing 6.57 million members. Unions in Brazil, Albania, North Korea and Tunisia also affiliated.
- 2nd, 1951 - attended by 205 delegates and observers (66 from Latin America) representing 146 national and regional organizations.
- 7th Moscow, 1975
- 9th Warsaw, October 3–6, 1983 - 110 organizations from 71 countries (members and observers) representing 73 million workers attended.

== Members ==
The following groups were affiliated with the TUI in 1960 to 1997.

- Albania - Union Professionelle des Travailleurs de l'Agriculture, et des Forets
- Angola - União dos Trabalhadores Angolanos
- Argentina - Union de Productores Agropecuarios de Republica Argentina
- Bangladesh - Chittagong Tea Garden Workers Union
- Benin - Fédération Nationale des Syndicats des Travailleurs de la Production Vegetale et Animale de Benin
- Bolivia - Unión Nacional de Campesinos
- Bulgaria - Syndicat des Travailleurs de l'Agriculture et des Industrie Alimentaire
- Chile - Confederación Nacional Campesina e Indigena de Chile - RANQUIL
- China - National Committee of the Chinese Agricultural, Forestry and Water Conservancy Workers' Union
- Colombia - FENSA
- Congo - Fédération Syndicale des Travailleurs de l'Agriculture et des Forets - FESYTRAF
- Costa Rica - Federación Nacional de Trabajadores de Plantaciones
- Cuba - Sindicato Nacional de Trabajadores Forestales
- Cyprus - Cyprus Agricultural, Forestry General Workers' Trade Union
- Czechoslovakia - Fédération des Travailleurs de l'Agriculture
- Ecuador - Federación Ecuatoriana de Indios
- El Salvador - Asociación de Trabajadores Agropecuarios de El Salvador - ATACES
- France - Federation of Agricultural and Forestry Workers - CGT
  - Guadeloupe - Confédération générale du travail de Guadeloupe
  - Reunion - CGT- Reunion
- East Germany - Union of Land, Food and Forests
- Ghana - General Agricultural Workers' Union of the Trade Union Congress
- Guyana - Guyana Agricultural and General Workers' Union
- Hungary - Fédération des Travailleurs Agricoles et Forestiers
- India - Bharatiya Khet Mazdoor Union
- India - All India Agricultural Workers Union
- Iraq - General Union of Agricultural Workers
- Italy - National Federation of Italian Agricultural Labourers and Employees
- Jordan - General Union of Agricultural Forestry and Plantation Workers of Jordan
- North Korea - Union des Travailleurs Agricoles de Corree
- Madagascar - Fedération des Syndicats des Travailleurs de Madagascar - FISEMA
- Mauritius - Agricultural Workers Union
- Mexico - Central Independiente de Oberos Agricolas y Campesinos de Mexico
- Mongolia - Comite Central du Syndicat des Travailleurs de l'Agriculture
- Nepal - Nepal Beekeepers' Association
- Nicaragua - Confederación de Campesinos y de Trabajodores de Nicaragua
- Nigeria - Federation of Agricultural Workers' Union of Nigeria
- Palestine - General Union of Palestinian Peasants
- Poland - Fedération des Syndicats des Travailleurs Agricoles
- Romania - Union des Syndicats des Enterprises et Institutes Agricoles
- Sierra Leone - Transport Agricultural and General Workers' Union
- Soviet Union - Syndicat des Travailleurs de l'Agriculture
- Sri Lanka - United Plantation Workers' Union
- Syria - Union Generale des Paysans
- Togo - SYNASCOT
- Vietnam - Syndicat National de Travaileurs de Forets de Vietnam
- South Yemen - Trade Union of Agricultural Workers

== Leadership ==
=== General Secretaries ===
1949: Ilio Bosi
1960: Vincenzo Galetti
1964: Umberto Fornari
1968: Claude Billault
1980: Gerard Laugier
1980s: René Digne
1980s: André Hemmerle

=== Presidents ===
1949: Suleiman Tjugito
1966: Giaochino Chisio
Andreas Kyriakou

== See also ==
- Krestintern
