= S. G. Patkar =

Indian trade unionist and politician

S.G. Patkar (1911 - 1972) was an Indian trade unionist and politician.

He was born in 1911. Patkar was a member of the Bombay Provincial Congress Committee for 7 years and a member of the All India Congress Committee for 6 years. He was part of the small nucleus building the Communist Party of India as a national organization in 1933. As of 1935 he was a member of the executive committee of the All India Trade Union Congress.

Patkar was elected to the Bombay Municipal Corporation in 1940. He served as secretary of the Girni Kamgar Union (GKU) 1937–1942, then serving as the general secretary of GKU 1942–1951. Patkar was one of the communist leaders arrested during a GKU general strike on 4 March 1940. Patkar was released from jail in July 1942.

Patkar was expelled from CPI in 1950, but was soon thereafter readmitted as party member. He was a member of the CPI Central Committee 1953–1956. He was elected to the Bombay Legislative Assembly in 1957, representing the Sewree constituency. He was part of the Samyukta Maharashtra Samiti caucus in the Bombay Legislative Assembly.

Patkar was a member of the Administrative Council of the Trade Union International of Textile, Leather and Fur Workers Unions. He died on 5 February 1972.
