= Ardone =

Ardone is a surname. Notable people with the surname include:

- Viola Ardone (born 1974), Italian writer
- Walter Ardone (born 1972), Australian soccer player
