= Industrial Union of Textiles, Clothing and Leather =

Former East German trade union (1950–1990)

The Industrial Union of Textiles, Clothing and Leather (German: Industriegewerkschaft Textil-Bekleidung-Leder, IG TBL) was a trade union representing workers in the textile, clothing, leather, and tobacco industries in East Germany.

== History ==
The union was founded in 1950, when the Free German Trade Union Federation (FDGB) reorganised its affiliates, merging the Industrial Union of Clothing, Industrial Union of Leather, and Industrial Union of Clothing. By 1964, the union had 650,000 members, and was the third largest affiliate of the FDGB.

Internationally, the union was affiliated to the Trade Union International of Textile, Leather and Fur Workers Unions. The union was also involved in sports associations, their names starting with "SV Verein".

The union's membership declined gradually, and by 1989, it had 601,747 members. In May 1990, it became independent, and it decided to transfer its members to the Leather Union and the Textile and Clothing Union. At the end of the year, it dissolved.

== Presidents ==
1950: Wilhelm Groß
1952: Gerhard Schwedka
1953: Anna Posselt
1975: Charlotte Bombal
1986: Annelie Unger
1990: Hans-Jürgen Nestmann
