= Lina Fibbi =

Italian politician, major and partisan

Giulietta Fibbi
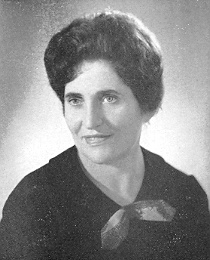
- Fibbi in the 1960s
- Born: 4 August 1920; Fiesole, Italy
- Died: 21 January 2018 (aged 98)
- Other name: Lina Fibbi
- Occupations: Trade union leader, communist politician, anti-fascist activist

Giulietta Fibbi (4 August 1920 – 21 January 2018) was an Italian trade union leader, communist politician and anti-fascist activist.

Born in Fiesole in Italy, Fibbi grew up in Lyon, where her socialist father fled to avoid persecution by the fascist government. When she was 15, she began working in a textile mill, and two years later, she became the leader of the Union of French Girls.

During World War II, Fibbi was imprisoned in the Rieucros Camp, where she worked closely with Teresa Noce to organise underground education in politics and the Italian language. She was returned to Italy in 1941 and immediately arrested but was released after six months, due to a lack of evidence against her. She was placed under surveillance for two years, and when this ended, she began working for the illegal Italian Communist Party (PCI). She joined the secretariat of the Garibaldi Brigades, and was one of the five founders of the Women's Defense Groups.

After the war, Fibbi began working for the Italian Federation of Textile Workers, led by Noce, and in 1955, she succeeded as the union's general secretary. In 1966, it became part of the new Italian Federation of Textile and Garment Workers, with Fibbi continuing in post until 1969. From about 1960, she additionally served as president of the Trade Union International of Textile, Leather and Fur Workers Unions.

In 1963, Fibbi was elected to the Chamber of Deputies, serving until 1976. She served on the central committee of the PCI from 1951 until 1979, when she moved to the central control commission. When the PCI dissolved, she joined the Democratic Party of the Left, becoming the leader of its national guarantee commission.

Trade union offices
Preceded by Teresa Noce	General Secretary of the Italian Federation of Textile Workers; 1955–1966	Succeeded by Union merged
Preceded by Teresa Noce	President of the Trade Union International of Textile, Leather and Fur Workers Unions c.1960–1968	Succeeded by ?
Preceded by New position	General Secretary of the Italian Federation of Textile and Garment Workers; 1966–1969	Succeeded by Sergio Garavini
