= National Federation of Italian Agricultural Labourers and Employees =

Trade union of Italy

File:Federbraccianti_logo.png

The National Federation of Italian Agricultural Labourers and Employees (Italian: Federazione Nazionale Braccianti e Salariati Agricoli, Federbraccianti) was a trade union representing agricultural workers in Italy.

The union was founded in 1948, as a split from the National Federation of Agricultural Workers. It affiliated to the Italian General Confederation of Labour, and internationally, to the Trade Union International of Agricultural, Forestry and Plantation Workers, in which it provided much of the leadership. By 1954, it claimed 1,084,116 members.

The union campaigned with other organisations for improved pay and working conditions, and in the 1970s it achieved equalisation of welfare and social security with industrial workers, and for workers not to be laid off without just cause.

Employment in the sector gradually declined, and by 1987, it had only 348,621 members. In 1988, it merged with the Italian Federation of Sugar, Food Industry and Tobacco Workers, to form the Italian Federation of Agroindustrial Workers.

== General Secretaries ==
1948: Luciano Romagnoli
1960: Giuseppe Caleffi
1973: Feliciano Rossitto
1977: Donatella Turtura
1980: Andrea Gianfagna
1986: Angelo Lana
