= Teresa Noce =

Italian politician (1900–1980)

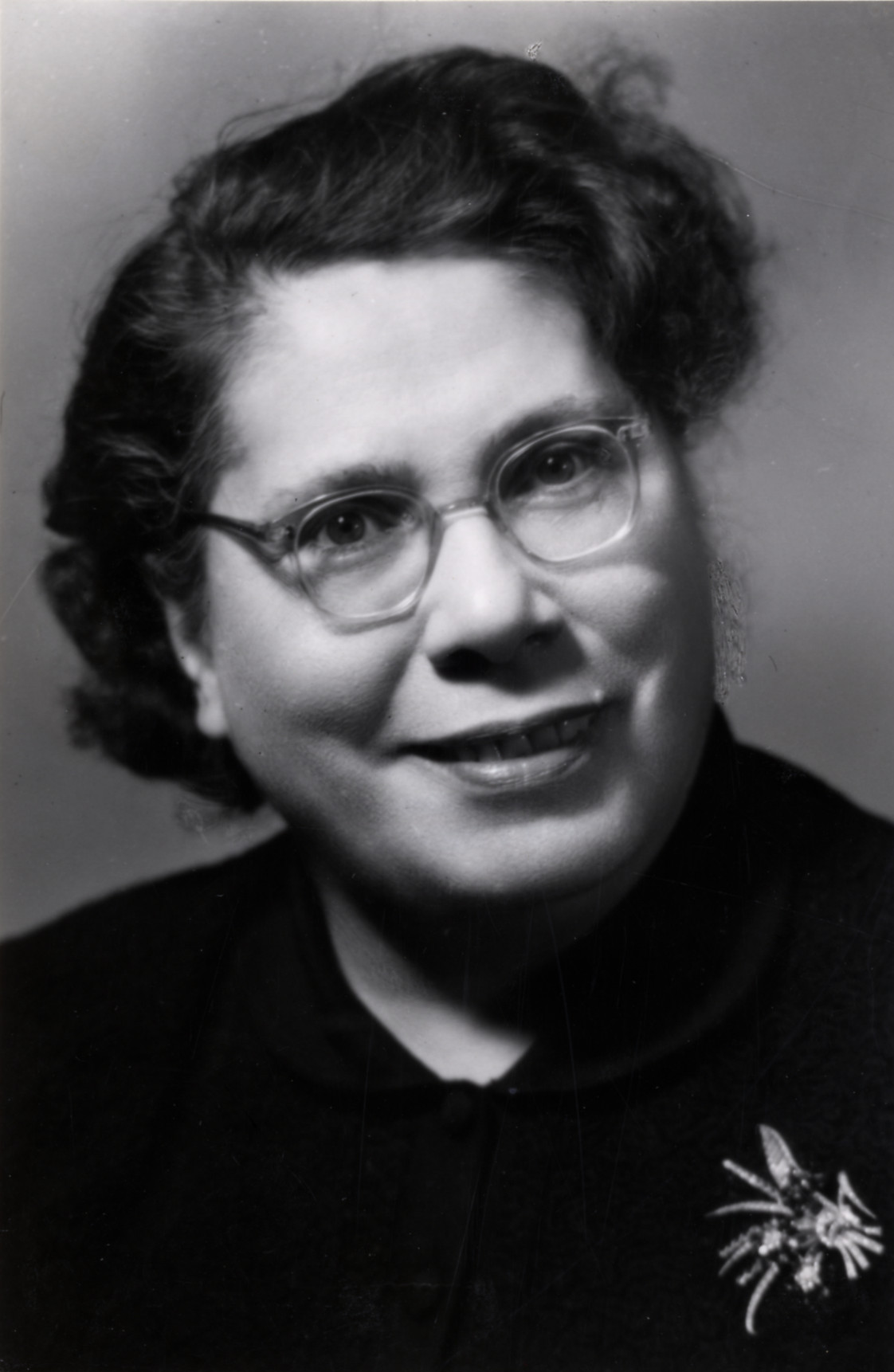
- Official portrait, 1948

Member of the Chamber of Deputies
- In office 8 May 1948 – 11 June 1958
- Constituency: Brescia

Member of the Constituent Assembly
- In office 25 June 1946 – 31 January 1948
- Constituency: Parma

Personal details
- Born: 29 July 1900 Turin, Piedmont, Kingdom of Italy
- Died: 22 January 1980 (aged 79) Bologna, Emilia-Romagna, Italy
- Party: Italian Communist Party (PCI)
- Spouse: Luigi Longo (m. 1926)
- Profession: Labor leader; journalist; politician

Teresa Noce (29 July 1900 – 22 January 1980), also known as Teresa Noce Longo since marriage, was an Italian labor leader, activist, journalist and feminist. She served as a parliamentary deputy and advocated broad social legislation benefiting mothers.

== Biography ==
Teresa Noce was born in Turin, Italy on 29 July 1900 to an unmarried, working-class mother. She started working as a turner in the local Fiat Brevetti factory at the age of ten. By the age of 12, she was involved in the workers' union and joined demonstrations. As a journalist she wrote for Il Grido del Popolo (The People's Cry) and Ordine Nuove from 1914 to 1917. She protested when Italy entered World War I in 1915 and joined the Young Socialist movement in 1919.

Following the rise of Mussolini and the Fascists, Noce left the Socialists, becoming a founding member of the Italian Communist Party (PCI) in 1921. After the Communist and Socialist parties were outlawed in 1925, she continued organizing workers illegally. During the 1920s, she oversaw the Communist Youth Federation and their periodical La voce della gioventù. She met PCI functionary Luigi Longo, whom she married in 1926. The two emigrated first to Moscow then to Paris. Noce organized a strike of rice workers in the spring of 1934. She then fled to Paris and surfaced as a leading political figure among the Italian exile community. As editor of Il Grido del Popolo, Noce called for improved labor conditions for the working class and for abolition the Special Tribunals used to imprison anti-Fascists. She also led a campaign on behalf of imprisoned PCI leader Antonio Gramsci that resulted in mass demonstrations in Paris.

She edited the anti-fascist periodical La voce della donne in 1934. In 1936, she travelled to Spain to see the Spanish Civil War. She penned several pamphlets reporting and appealing on behalf of the Spanish Republicans. After France surrendered to Nazi Germany in 1940, Noce remained there, organizing cells among the Italian exile community in Paris. She led an effective partisan unit as a member of the underground and adopted the nom de guerre Estella. Though she avoided arrest on a number of occasions, she was eventually arrested and deported to Ravensbrück, the German concentration camp for women. She was freed in the spring of 1945 and returned to Italy. That year, she conceived the treni della felicità initiative, whereby 70,000 impoverished children were transported to northern Italy to be hosted by families that could support them.

In 1947, Noce was elected as the general secretary of the Italian Federation of Textile Workers, becoming the first woman to lead a major Italian industrial trade union. She served until 1955, when she became the general secretary of the Trade Union International of Textile and Clothing Workers, and then as president of its successor, the Trade Union International of Textile, Leather and Fur Workers Unions.

In Italy Noce was elected to the Central Committee of the PCI. She was then elected to the Italian Parliament and was appointed general secretary of the textile workers union, where she founded the publication La voce dei tessili. In 1951 she was one of two dissenting votes in the Communist leadership against a proposal made by dictator Joseph Stalin.

Noce was aligned with the Unione Donne Italiane (Italian Women's Union). She and other women of the Italian Parliament campaigned for comprehensive maternity legislation. They secured victory in 1950 with a law protecting working mothers, providing for children of infants and giving five months of paid leave for pregnant women.

Noce died in Bologna on 22 January 1980.

== Electoral history ==
Election	House	Constituency	Party	Votes	Result
1946	Constituent Assembly	Parma–Modena–Piacenza–Reggio Emilia	PCI	47,219	Elected
1948	Chamber of Deputies	Brescia–Bergamo	FDP	34,445	Elected
1953	Chamber of Deputies	Brescia–Bergamo	PCI	13,877	Elected

== Selected publications ==
- Nuestros hermanos, los internacionales (1937)
- Tra gli eroi ed i martiri della liberta (1937)
- Gioventù senza sole (1938)
- Teruel martirio e liberazione di un popolo! (1939)
- Ma domani fara giorno (1952)
- Rivoluzionaria professional (1974)
- Vivere in piedi (1978)
- Estella: Autobiographie einer italienischen Revolutionärin (1981)

Trade union offices
Preceded by Domenico Marchioro	General Secretary of the Italian Federation of Textile Workers; 1947–1955	Succeeded by Lina Fibbi
Preceded by ?	General Secretary of the Trade Union International of Textile and Clothing Workers; 1955–1958	Succeeded by Federation merged
Preceded by New position	President of the Trade Union International of Textile, Leather and Fur Workers Unions; 1958–1960s	Succeeded by Lina Fibbi
