= Treni della felicità =

Italian post-war social initiative

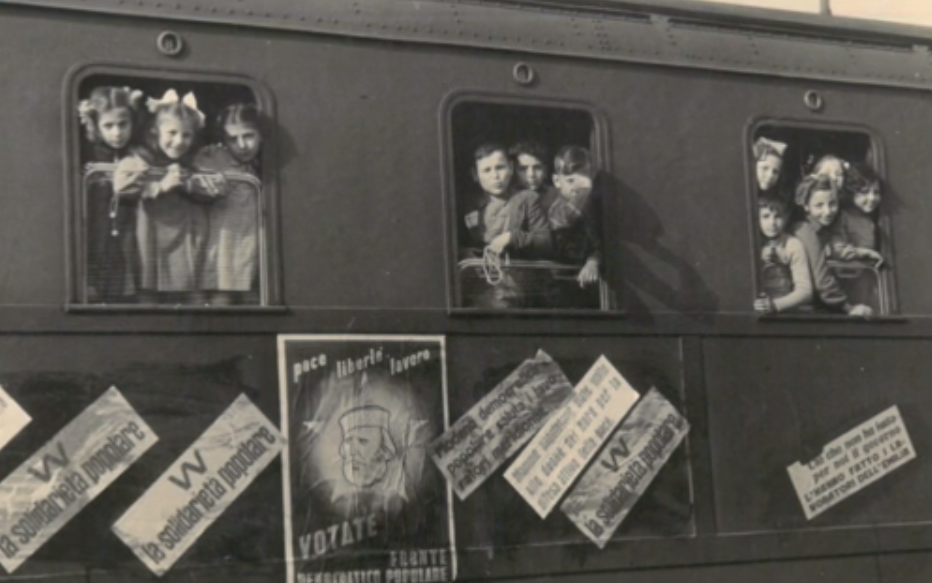
A train transporting children from Naples to Modena in 1946

The treni della felicità (lit. 'trains of happiness') was a post-war initiative by the Italian Communist Party (PCI) and the Unione donne italiane (UDI), whereby 70,000 impoverished children from southern Italy were transported to northern Italy between 1945 and 1952 to be hosted by families that could support them.

== History ==
The initiative was conceived by Teresa Noce and the Unione donne italiane (Italian Women's Union, UDI), and was promoted by the Italian Communist Party (PCI). The outskirts of Milan were full of impoverished children, and Noce asked her PCI comrades in Reggio Emilia if they would be willing to host some of the children during the upcoming winter. Reggio Emilia offered to host 2,000 children. Other cities in Emilia-Romagna followed suit, including Parma, Piacenza, Modena, Bologna, and Ravenna. On 16 December 1945, the first train departed from Milan and travelled to Reggio Emilia, carrying 1,800 children. Early trains also departed from Turin.

At the 5th PCI Congress in January 1946, it was decided to shift the focus of the initiative to southern Italy, which was poorer and less developed than the north. That year, 12,000 Neapolitan children boarded trains to the north to spend the winter with host families. Between 1945 and 1952, around 70,000 children from Lazio, Campania, Apulia, Calabria, Sicily, and Sardinia were hosted by families in Emilia-Romagna, Tuscany, Marche, Veneto, and Lombardy in northern Italy. The host families were not wealthy by any means, but were still willing to feed and house the children. The majority of the children would eventually return home, but still maintained relationships with their host families in the subsequent years. In addition to the UDI and the PCI, the initiative was supported by the ANPI, CGIL, and Italian Red Cross.

== In popular culture ==
In 2019, Viola Ardone published Il treno dei bambini, a novel about a young Neapolitan boy who travels to northern Italy on the treni della felicità. It was adapted into a Netflix film, The Children's Train, which premiered in 2024.

== See also ==
- Southern question
- Orphan Train, a similar program in the United States
