= Italian Federation of Garment Workers =

Trade union of Italy

The Italian Federation of Garment Workers (Italian: Federazione Italiana Lavoratori dell'Abbigliamento, FILA) was a trade union representing workers involved in making clothing and footwear in Italy.

Until the 1920s, garment workers were organised in the Italian Federation of Clothing, but this was banned by the fascist government. In 1947, workers decided to form a new union, the "Italian Federation of Garment Workers", which affiliated to the Italian General Confederation of Labour. By 1954, the union had 86,837 members.

In 1966, the union merged with the Italian Federation of Textile Workers, to form the Italian Federation of Textile and Garment Workers.

== General Secretaries ==
1947: Remo Savio
1960: Antonio Molinari
