= Italian Federation of Textile and Garment Workers =

Trade union of Italy

Logo of the union

The Italian Federation of Textile and Garment Workers (Italian: Federazione Italiana Lavoratori Tessili ed Abbigliamento, FILTEA) was a trade union representing workers in the textile and clothing industries in Italy.

The union was founded in March 1966, when the Italian Federation of Textile Workers merged with the Italian Federation of Garment Workers and the Italian Federation of Hat and Allied Workers. Like its predecessors, it affiliated to the Italian General Confederation of Labour.

The new union was immediately involved in disputes over pay and conditions, and then the Hot Autumn of 1968. The following decades saw a continuing decline in employment in the industries, and by 1998, the union had 138,289 members.

In 2009, the union merged with the Italian Federation of Chemical, Energy and Manufacturing Workers, to form the Italian Federation of Chemical, Textile, Energy and Manufacturing Workers.

== General Secretaries ==
1966: Lina Fibbi
1969: Sergio Garavini
1975: Nella Marcellino and Ettore Masucci
1981: Nella Marcellino
1986: Aldo Amoretti
1991: Agostino Megale
2000: Valeria Fedeli
