= The Children's Train =

2024 Italian film by Cristina Comencini

- Italian Netflix teaser poster
- Italian: Il treno dei bambini
- Directed by: Cristina Comencini
- Screenplay by: Furio Andreotti; Giulia Calenda; Cristina Comencini; Camille Dugay
- Based on: The Children's Train by Viola Ardone
- Produced by: Carlo Degli Esposti; Nicola Serra
- Starring: Barbara Ronchi; Serena Rossi; Christian Cervone; Stefano Accorsi; Francesco Di Leva; Antonia Truppo
- Cinematography: Italo Petriccione
- Edited by: Patrizio Marone; Esmeralda Calabria
- Music by: Nicola Piovani
- Production company: Palomar
- Distributed by: Netflix
- Release date: 20 October 2024 (Rome)
- Running time: 105 minutes
- Country: Italy
- Language: Italian

The Children's Train (Italian: Il treno dei bambini) is a 2024 Italian drama film co-written and directed by Cristina Comencini, based on the 2019 novel of the same name by Viola Ardone. It tells the story of a young Neapolitan boy who travels to northern Italy to live with a host family as part of the treni della felicità initiative. It premiered at the 19th Rome Film Festival on 20 October 2024 and was released on Netflix on 4 December 2024.

== Plot ==
In 1946, Antonietta, an impoverished single mother, arranges for her son Amerigo to travel from Naples to northern Italy to live with a host family as part of the treni della felicità (trains of happiness) initiative. The initiative was organized by the Italian Communist Party (PCI) to transport poor southern Italian children to northern families who could support them in the years after World War II. Amerigo refuses to go, but relents when he is caught by Antonietta's boyfriend fraudulently selling white-painted rats for furs.

At the station, the elderly woman Pachiochia scares the children and their parents from sending the children up north, claiming that they would be deported to Siberia and eaten by cannibals. However, the PCI activists harangue the crowd with the dire state of their children following the war, overcoming resistance to the trip.

Arriving in Modena, the children are picked up one-by-one by their respective fosters, with Amerigo, the last to be fostered, reluctantly being taken in at the last-minute by Derna, a former partisan who lives alone after losing her boyfriend during the war. The next day, Derna introduces Amerigo to her brother Alcide and his sons Revo, Lucio and Nario.

Alcide teaches Amerigo multiple skills including playing the violin, which Amerigo takes up a passion for. At the same time, Amerigo comes into conflict with Lucio, who is jealous of his father's affections towards Amerigo. When Alcide's household invites Amerigo to try baking bread in the oven, he recalls Pachiochia's scaremongering and fears they mean to cook him. So, he hides in the woods until Derna promises that he will go home at the end of the wheat harvest, leading to them gradually opening up to each other.

Amerigo attends school, where he is bullied for being a southerner while being defended by a reluctant Lucio. At a May Day festival, Lucio taunts Amerigo about his mother, leading to Amerigo beating him up before running away. He then stumbles across Derna being struck by a chauvinist colleague.

Later that night, Amerigo compares Derna with his mother, saying that Antonietta would not have let herself be treated that way before comforting her as she collapses into tears. The next evening, a desperate Lucio seeks help from Amerigo in finding Rossana, a homesick girl from the south who ran away after Lucio told her to follow the railway tracks home. They find her by the tracks near a skeleton that she discovered earlier. Lucio finally becomes friends with them.

The harvest arrives and the southern children are sent home. Amerigo is greeted coldly by his mother, who cynically tells him that he is ordained for a destitute life. After some time, Amerigo, who is the only child not to receive messages and gifts from his fosters up north, visits the PCI offices and learns that his mother had kept Derna's packages from him.

Arriving home, Antonietta reveals that she had pawned the violin Amerigo received from Alcide. When he reproaches her for being selfish, she slaps him. That evening, Amerigo runs away and takes a train to Modena, where he is tearfully reunited with Derna.

In 1994, an adult Amerigo, who is now a successful violinist, is informed of Antonietta's death. Arriving in Naples, he discovers his old violin which Antonietta had redeemed, driving him to tears. A voiceover reveals that Antonietta had actually allowed Amerigo to run away and had written Derna asking her to accept him permanently or send him back, saying that, sometimes, those who let another go love them more than those who keep them.

== Cast ==
- Barbara Ronchi as Derna
- Serena Rossi as Antonietta
- Christian Cervone as Amerigo
  - Stefano Accorsi as older Amerigo
- Francesco Di Leva as Capa E' Fierro
- Antonia Truppo as Maddalena Criscuolo
- Monica Nappo as Zandragliona
- Dora Romano as Pachiochia
- Beatrice Schiros as Mrs. Ferrari
- Ivan Zerbinati as Alcide Benvenuti
- Lucio Morano as Luzio
- Jacopo Pagano Guerrieri as Rivo
- Domenico Rea as Tommasino
- Sophia Cecere as Mariuccia
- Giorgia Arena as Rosa

== Production ==
The film was shot in Pistoia and Montalcino, both in Tuscany, as well as Naples and Reggio Emilia.

== Release ==
A teaser trailer for the film was released on 12 February 2024. Promotional stills were released in May 2024. A teaser poster was released on 18 July 2024. The film premiered at the 19th Rome Film Festival on 20 October 2024. It was released on Netflix on 4 December 2024.

== Awards and nominations ==
Award	Year	Category	Recipient(s)	Result	Ref.
David di Donatello	2025	Best Composer	Nicola Piovani	Nominated	
