= Ilio Bosi =

Italian politician (1903–1995)

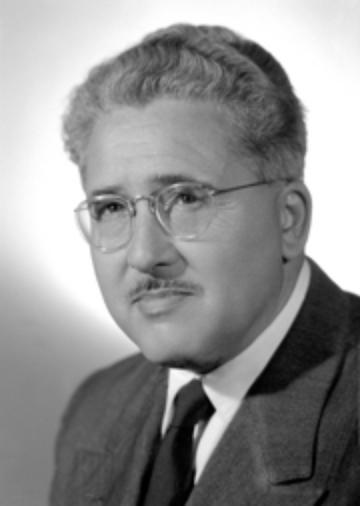
Bosi in 1948

Ilio Bosi (4 October 1903 – 5 December 1995) was an Italian communist politician and trade unionist.

Born in Ferrara, Bosi joined the Italian Socialist Party in 1920 and was then a founder member of the Italian Communist Party (PCI). In 1924, he joined the central committee of the Italian Communist Youth Federation, and began undertaking underground work in southern Italy for the party. In 1926, he was appointed as the party's secretary for Sicily and Calabria, but he was arrested soon afterwards, and sentenced to ten years in prison.

Bosi was released in the early 1930s, but was re-arrested in 1934, and sentenced to 16 years in prison, being released only after the fall of the fascist government. He then became prominent in the resistance movement in the Comacchio Valleys, then moved to Milan, where he joined the command of the Garibaldi Brigades, and was then appointed to the triumvirate leading the resistance in Liguria.

Following the end of World War II, Bosi moved to Rome, to join the PCI's National Directorate, then became the leader of its organisation in Ferrara. In the 1946 Italian general election, he was elected to represent Bologna in the Italian Constituent Assembly, and he then served in the Italian Senate.

In 1946, Bosi also became the general secretary of the National Federation of Agricultural Workers (Confederterra), a large organisation which represented agricultural workers, and from 1947 also served on the executive of the Italian General Confederation of Labour. Confederterra later became an umbrella organisation for several trade unions, with Bosi continuing as its overall leader. In 1949, he became the founding president of the Trade Union International of Agricultural, Forestry and Plantation Workers.

In 1963, Bosi left his national positions, and returned to Ferrara, working in public administration. Shortly before his death, he published an autobiography, Il bastone e la galera.

Trade union offices
Preceded by Raffaele Pastore	General Secretary of Confederterra; 1946–1960?	Succeeded by ?
Preceded by New position	General Secretary of the Trade Union International of Agricultural, Forestry and Plantation Workers; 1949–1960	Succeeded by Vincenzo Galetti
