= Free German Trade Union Federation =

Former East German organization

- Freier Deutscher Gewerkschaftsbund
- Predecessor: General German Trade Union Federation
- Successor: German Trade Union Federation
- Founded: 9 February 1946
- Dissolved: May 1990
- Location: East Germany
- Members: ▲9,600,000 (1981)
- Publication: Tribüne
- Affiliations: WFTU

The Free German Trade Union Federation (FDGB; German: Freier Deutscher Gewerkschaftsbund) was the sole national trade union centre of the German Democratic Republic (GDR or East Germany) from 1946 to 1990. It was a mass organisation and a constituent member of the National Front. The FDGB was a federation of trade unions that nominally represented all workers in East Germany, but in practice was an agency of the ruling Socialist Unity Party of Germany (SED) to enforce ideological conformity in the workplace. The FDGB was dissolved by the De Maizière government shortly before German reunification.

== Structure ==
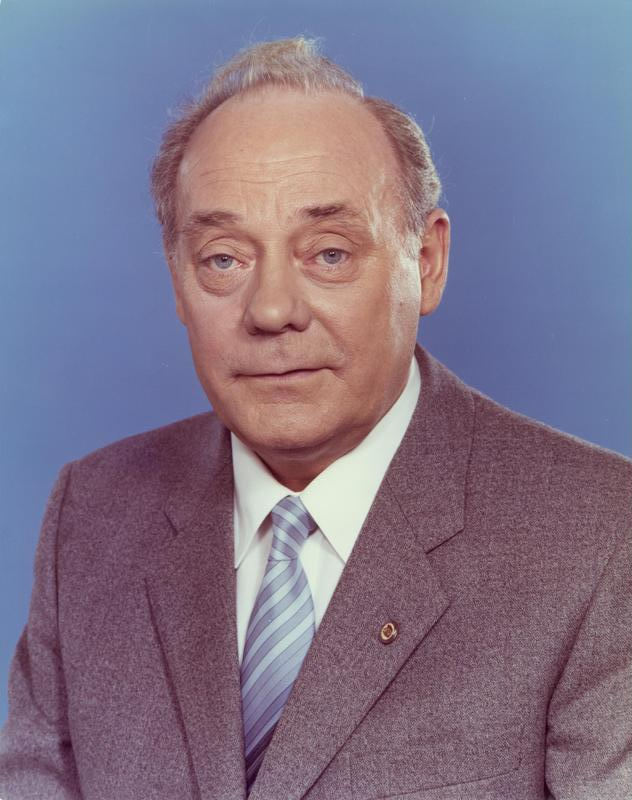
Harry Tisch, FDGB chairman from 1975 to 1989.

The FDGB was an official mass organisation, styled as a trade union federation composed of various trade unions representing an individual industry. A constituent organisation of the National Front, the official coalition government of East Germany, it was portrayed to represent the trade unions' and workers' interests in the Volkskammer. As a basic component and tool of the SED's power structure, it was constructed on the same strictly centralist and hierarchical model similar to other organizations in East Germany. In practice, it was the government agency responsible for representing the SED's interests in the workplace.

The smallest unit was a Kollektiv, which nearly all workers in any organisation belonged to, including state leaders and party functionaries. They recommended trustworthy people as the lowest FDGB functionaries and voted for them in open-list ballots. The higher positions ranged from "Departmental Union Leader" (Abteilungsgewerkschaftsleiter, AGL) to Leader of the "Central BGL" (Betriebsgewerkschaftsleitung - Company Union Leadership in combines); they were normally full-time and held by SED members with a history of toeing the party line, or in some cases bloc party members. Their jobs, like those of the FDGB district leaders, were assured until they retired as long as they did not stray from party policy.

The chairman of the FDGB was Herbert Warnke until his death on 26 March 1975, when he was replaced by Harry Tisch, a member of the SED's Politburo, who kept the post until the political turnaround in 1989.

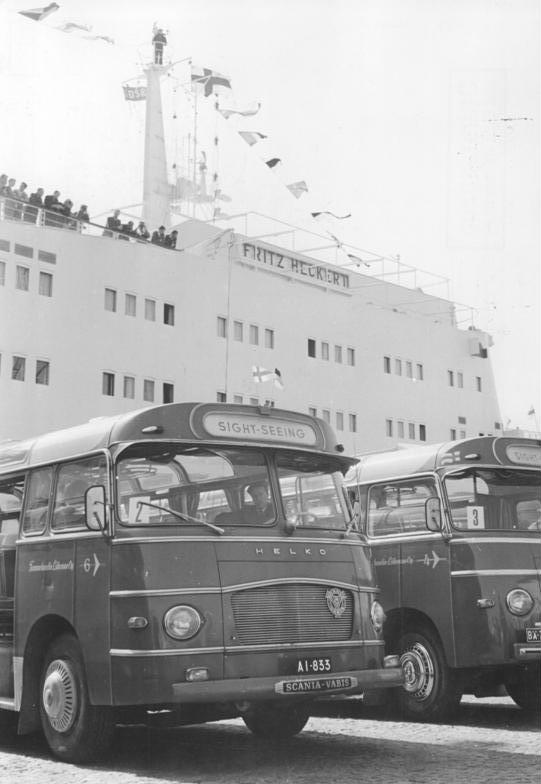
FDGB's cruise ship MS "Fritz Heckert" in Helsinki in May 1961.

== Function ==
The FDGB held official responsibility for setting work norms, through negotiating with management, protecting workers from management caprice, and enforcing GDR labor code and worker protections. It was active for social tasks for its members, which included hospital visits, presenting awards, giving gifts on special anniversaries, even organizing health spas and the hard-to-get holiday bookings through its own holiday service. It was also involved in recruiting members for military functions, incentivizing recruitment with small benefits and occasional peer pressure. Large numbers of workers and employees were recruited to the paramilitary organization Combat Groups of the Working Class through the FDGB. The FDGB was criticised for holding too much power and making the process of firing a worker lengthy and difficult.

In the SED's one-party system, the FDGB was in charge of ideological conformity within companies and workplaces. Membership in the FDGB was voluntary, but unofficially it was hardly possible to develop a career without joining. In 1986, 98% of all workers and employees were organized in the FDGB, which had 9.6 million members. This meant that it was nominally one of the world's largest trade unions. As well as improving members’ career chances, membership in the FDGB also offered various "concessions". The FDGB's ultimate function was the enforcement of the SED's Marxist-Leninist ideology and prevention of dissent in the workplace.

== Membership ==
=== Chairmen ===
Name	Term	Party
Hans Jendretzky	1946 – 1948	SED
Herbert Warnke	1948 – 1975	SED
Harry Tisch	1975 – 1989	SED
Annelis Kimmel	1989 – 1990	SED
Helga Mausch	1990	NDPD

== School ==
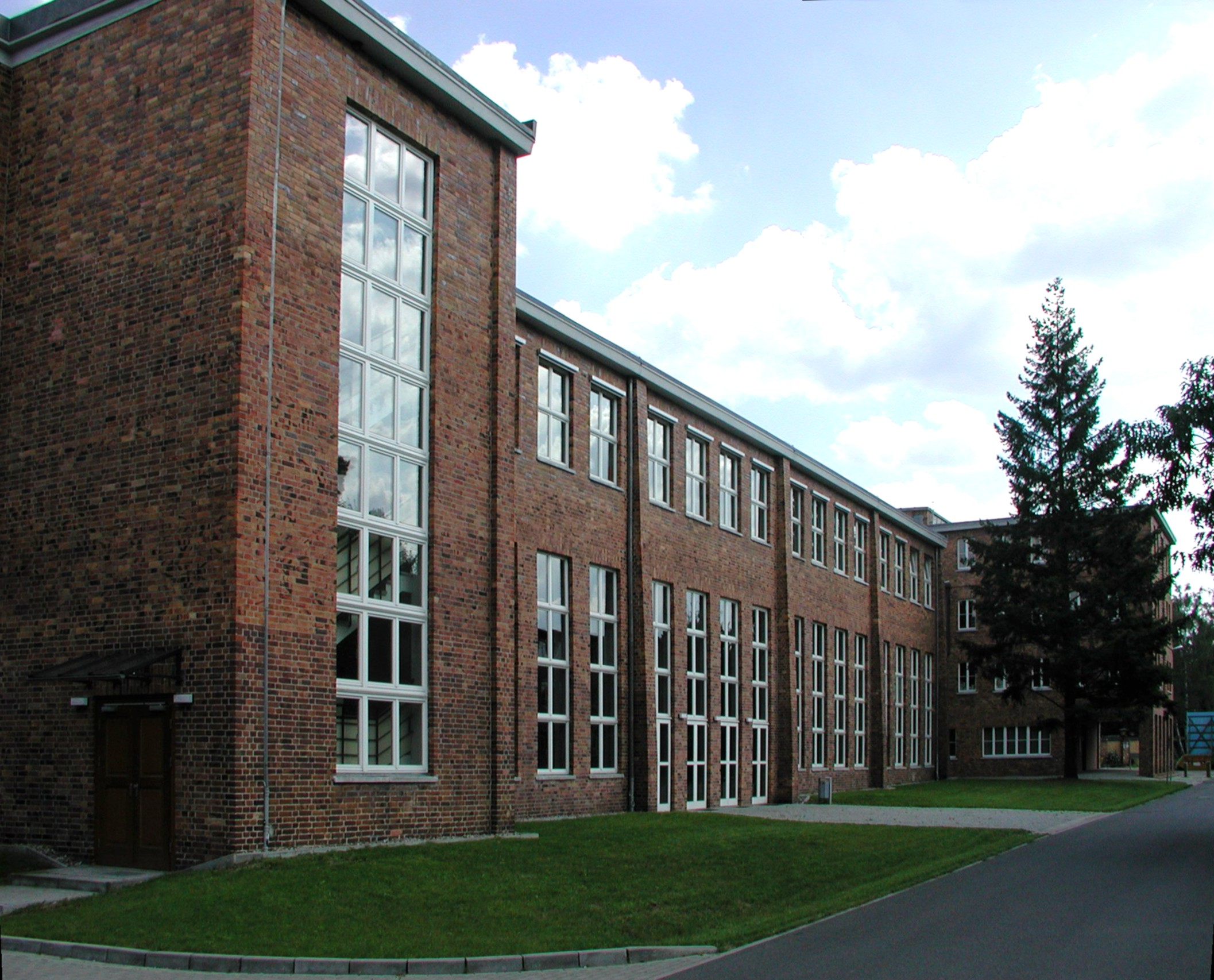
Georg-Waterstradt-Building, built c. 1952, at the trade union school

In spring 1946, the former ADGB Trade Union School in Bernau bei Berlin, which before Nazi rule had belonged to the Allgemeiner Deutsche Gewerkschaftsbund (ADGB) (Federation of German Trade Unions), was given to the FDGB to use as a training centre. After some restoration work, the school opened in 1947 under the name FDGB-Bundesschule "Theodor Leipart" (Theodor Leipart FDGB Trade Union School). In January 1952 it was given degree awarding status and renamed Gewerkschaftshochschule "Fritz Heckert" (Fritz Heckert Trade Union College). In the early 1950s the FDGB considerably increased the size of the school, constructing new buildings on the site, in addition to those of the former ADGB school. The original part of the school, completed in 1930, was a project of the Bauhaus design school and in 2017 it was added to the UNESCO World Heritage Site the Bauhaus and its Sites in Weimar, Dessau and Bernau.

Short term two and four week training courses and longer-term study were offered, including collective bargaining, social and economic policy, youth and women's issues, employment law, business administration, history of the labour movement, etc. After 1952 two year courses, and later, from 1956, three year bachelor's degree-equivalent courses were also taught. From 1958 correspondence courses were also offered, and from 1959 courses were run for foreign trade unionists. Over 15,000 East German and 5,000 foreign trade unionists were trained by the FDGB school between 1947 and 1990.

The college closed in September 1990 just before German reunification.

The buildings have been used by the Internat des Bildungszentrums der Handwerkskammer Berlin (Berlin Chamber of Skilled Crafts training school) since 2007.

== German reunification ==
In May 1990, shortly before German reunification, the FDGB was dissolved. Many former members did not join the West German (now German) unions, some, due to the lightning privatization of the GDR, simply because they had lost their jobs.

== Affiliates ==
The following unions were affiliated to the FDGB:

Union	Abbreviation	Formed	Left	Fate	Membership (1964)
German Postal Union	DPG	1990	1990	Dissolved	N/A
Industrial Union of Chemicals, Glass and Ceramics	IG CGK	1946	1990	Merged into Chemical, Paper and Ceramic Union	130,365
Industrial Union of Clothing	IG Bekleidung	1946	1950	Merged into IG TBL	N/A
Industrial Union of Construction	IG Bau	1946	1950	Merged into IG Bau-Holz	N/A
Industrial Union of Construction and Wood	IG Bau-Holz	1950	1990	Dissolved	?
Industrial Union of Energy	IG Energie	1949	1958	Merged into IG EPT	N/A
Industrial Union of Energy, Post and Transport	IG EPT	1958	1963	Split into IG PF, IG TuN, IG Bergbau-Energie	N/A
Industrial Union of Food, Luxuries and Hospitality	IG NGG	1946	1958	Merged into Gew. Handel	N/A
Industrial Union of Leather	IG Leder	1946	1950	Merged into IG TBL	N/A
Industrial Union of the Local Economy	IG ÖW	1955	1958	Dissolved	N/A
Industrial Union of Metal	IG Metall	1946	1990	Dissolved	1,000,000
Industrial Union of Metallurgy	IG Metallurgie	1951	1958	Merged into IG Metall	N/A
Industrial Union of Mining and Energy	IG Bergbau-Energie	1946	1990	Dissolved	375,000
Industrial Union of Post and Telecommunications	IG PF	1946	1958	Merged into IG EPT	N/A
Industrial Union of Printing and Paper	IG DuP	1946	1990	Dissolved	?
Industrial Union of Railways	IG Eisenbahn	1946	1963	Merged into IG TuN	N/A
Industrial Union of Textiles	IG Textil	1946	1950	Merged into IG TBL	N/A
Industrial Union of Textiles, Clothing and Leather	IG TBL	1950	1990	Dissolved	650,000
Industrial Union of Trade and Transport	IG Handel und Transport	1946	1949	Split into Gew. Handel and IG Transport	N/A
Industrial Union of Transport	IG Transport	1990	1990	Dissolved	N/A
Industrial Union of Transport and Communication	IG TuN	1963	1990	Split into GdE, IG Transport and DPG	600,000
Industrial Union of Wood	IG Holz	1946	1950	Merged into IG Bau-Holz	N/A
Union of Academic Research	Gew. W	1953	1990	Dissolved	?
Union of Administration, Banking and Finance	VBV	1946	1958	Merged into Sta-Ge-Fi	N/A
Union of Army Members	GdAA	1990	1990	Dissolved	N/A
Union of Art	Gew. Kunst	1949	1990	Merged into Media Union	60,000
Union of Art and Literature	Gew. Kunst und Schrifttum	1945	1950	Dissolved	N/A
Union of Civilian Workers of the NVA		1973	1990	Dissolved	N/A
Union of Education and Training	UuE	1946	1990	Dissolved	280,000
Union of Employees	GdA	1946	1949	Split into Gew. Handel and VBV	N/A
Union of Employees of State Organs and the Communal Economy	MSK	1961	1990	Dissolved	500,000
Union of the German Press		1950	1953	Disaffiliated	N/A
Union of Government Administration, Healthcare and Finance	Sta-Ge-Fi	1958	1961	Split into Gew. Gusundheitswesen and MSK	N/A
Union of Healthcare	Gew. Gesundheitswesen	1949	1958	Merged into Sta-Ge-Fi	N/A
Union of Healthcare	Gew. Gesundheitswesen	1961	1990	Dissolved	250,000
Union of Land, Food and Forests	Gew. Land, Nahrungsgüter und Forst	1946	1990	Dissolved	315,578
Union of the Police	GdVP	1990	1990	Dissolved	N/A
Union of Railway Workers	GdE	1990	1990	Dissolved	N/A
Union of Trade	Gew. Handel	1949	1990	Dissolved	800,000
Union of Transport	IG Transport	1949	1958	Merged into IG EPT	N/A
Union of Transport	IG Transport	1990	1990	Dissolved	N/A
Wismut Industrial Union	IG W	1950	1990	Merged into Union of Mining and Energy	?
