= National Federation of Agricultural Workers (Italy) =

Trade union of Italy

The National Federation of Agricultural Workers (Italian: Federazione Nazionale fra i Lavoratori della Terra, Federterra) was a trade union representing rural workers in Italy.

The union was founded in Bologna on 23 November 1901, and brought together 758 local unions, with a total of 152,000 members, the vast majority in the north of Italy. It grew quickly, having 220,000 members by the end of 1902, and 900,000 by the end of World War I. In the north of the country, it mostly recruited agricultural labourers, but in the central areas, most of its members were sharecroppers, and in the south, it recruited all workers in rural areas and smaller towns.

In 1905, Argentina Altobelli was appointed as the union's national secretary, an almost unique example of a woman leading a major trade union open to both men and women in this period. Under her leadership, the union affiliated to the new General Confederation of Labour.

The National Federation of Agricultural Co-operatives was founded in 1908, and Federterra worked closely with it. The growth of local agricultural co-operatives played a major role in the growth of the union, as did contracts provided by sympathetic local authorities controlled by the Italian Socialist Party.

The union held a major conference in Bologna in 1913, which decided to campaign for agricultural workers to have a clearer employer-employee relationship with farmers. This position led to numerous major struggles by sharecroppers in the 1920s.

The union was banned by the fascist government in 1926, but it was revived at the end of World War II, and affiliated to the new Italian General Confederation of Labour (CGIL). Membership reached a new peak of around 1,500,000, and in 1947, it led a largely successful campaign for better working rights, which achieved a maximum eight-hour working day and wage increases linked to inflation. However, social and Christian democrats soon left to form their own, rival, unions. CGIL decided that Federterra should be split into unions tied to workers' relationship with their employer, so in 1947, the National Federation of Sharecroppers (Federmezzadri) was split out, then in 1948, the remaining members transferred to the new National Federation of Italian Agricultural Labourers and Employees (Federbraccianti).

After 1948, the union was renamed as the National Confederation of Agricultural Workers (Confederterra). Now an umbrella organisation, it brought together Federmezzadri and Federbraccianti with smaller organisations not affiliated to CGIL: the National Association of Direct Growers, and later, also the Association of Southern Peasants, the Union of Sicilian Farmers, the Union of Sardinian Peasants and Shepherds and the National Coordination Committee. In 1955, all these unions other than those representing workers in co-operatives formed the National Alliance of Peasants.

Federterra was dissolved in 1977, when CGIL decided to focus on representing employees, the other organisations forming Confcoltivatori.

== General Secretaries ==
1905: Argentina Altobelli
1926: Union banned
1944: Raffaele Pastore
1946: Ilio Bosi
