= Women's Defense Groups =

Groups for women's defense
| Abbreviation | GDD |
| Foundation | 1943 |
| Founder | Italian Communist Party |
| Dissolution | 1945 |
| Purpose | Emancipation of women |
| Members | ca. 70,000 |

Women's Defence Groups, or Defence Groups for Women and for the Assistance of Freedom Fighters (Italian: Gruppi di difesa della donna e per l'assistenza ai combattenti della libertà), was a multi-party organization of women born during the Italian Resistance. Formed in Milan in November 1943, the initiative was spearheaded by the Italian Communist Party, as part their vision for a united front against fascism.

The groups had a double objective: engaging in the struggle against the fascist regime while advocating the emancipation and empowerment of women.

== History ==
The groups were formed collaboratively by women from diverse political backgrounds. Prominent participants included communists Giovanna Barcellona, Lina Fibbi, and Caterina Picolato; socialists Laura Conti and Lina Merlin; actionist Elena Dreher and Ada Gobetti; as well as women associated with the Giustizia e Libertà (Justice and Freedom) movement. Republican and Catholic women, along with those without prior political or ideological commitments, also joined. These groups predominantly operated in the northern midlands of Italy. Scholars attribute this geographic spread to the influence of local women's clothing, which fostered individual initiative and civic awareness.

Initially, the women's groups aimed to support resistance efforts in auxiliary roles. However, they quickly assumed leadership responsibilities in areas such as information dissemination, propaganda, issuing orders, and handling ammunition. Some women even directly engaged as "gappiste" in the so-called Gruppi di Azione Patriottica - GAP (Groups of Patriotic Association). Ada Gobetti was among the first women to criticize the use of the term "assistance" in the group's name. In 1944, the organization's aims were reformulated to prioritize activities that broadly promoted women's emancipation.

In Turin, the GDG primarily organized in factory settings, forming groups of approximately ten workers. They gathered in private homes, where they received practical instructions on factory sabotage, typing, telegraphy, and first aid. Additionally, a women's newspaper titled "Noi Donne" (Us, women) was published, drawing inspiration from titles used during the Spanish and Paris wars in 1937.

In Milan, the groups were organized by Irma Brambilla, Iole Radice, and Lidia Salvano. Meetings were intentionally held in different locations, often on Sunday mornings, to avoid exposure. After a rally led by a young woman in her factory with the help of her coworkers, impromptu rallies in factories started to spread all over the Italy.

== Movies and documentaries ==
In 2016, a documentary film Nome di battaglia: Donna (Battle name: Woman) directed by Daniele Segre was released. It showcased stories of several of the surviving Women's Defense Groups' activists from the Piedmont region.
