= Italian Federation of Food Industry Workers =

Trade union of Italy

The Italian Federation of Food Industry Workers (Italian: Federazione Italiana Lavoratori Industrie Alimentari, FILIA) was a trade union representing workers involved in food processing in Italy.

The union was founded in 1944 as the National Food Federation, and affiliated to the new Italian General Confederation of Labour. In 1947, it became the "Italian Federation of Food Industry Workers". By 1955, the union had about 109,486 members.

In 1960, the union merged with the Italian Federation of Sugar and Alcohol Industry Employees and the National Union of Tobacco, to form the Italian Federation of Sugar, Food Industry and Tobacco Workers.

== General Secretaries ==
1944: Giovanni Tabili
1951: Gaetano Invernizzi
1954: Spero Ghedini
1981: Peppino Dall'Aglio
