= Vincenzo Galetti =

Italian politician (1926–1987)

General Secretary of the Trade Union International of Agricultural, Forestry and Plantation Workers
- In office 1960–1964
- Preceded by: Ilio Bosi
- Succeeded by: Umberto Fornari

President of the National Co-operative and Mutual League
- In office 1974–1986

Personal details
- Born: March 8, 1926 San Pietro in Casale, Kingdom of Italy
- Died: June 2, 1987 (aged 61)
- Party: Italian Communist Party
- Occupation: Trade unionist, politician, anti-fascist activist

Vincenzo Galetti (8 March 1926 – 2 June 1987) was an Italian trade unionist, communist politician and anti-fascist activist.

Born in San Pietro in Casale, Galetti grew up in Galliera. He completed an apprenticeship as an electrician before finding work at Ducati. Late in 1942, he was denounced by the factory management, who were in league with the Fascist government, for desertion. This led him to make contact with the organised anti-fascist movement. Under the pseudonym "Aurelio", he was a leading figure in the liberation of Galliera, serving in the Luccarelli battalion, and then the Garibaldi Brigades, and survived multiple raids on the fascists.

In 1944, Galetti joined the Italian Communist Party (PCI) and early in 1945 the party placed him in charge of its lower Bologna region. Over the next decade, he held various positions within the party, and served on its regional committee. From 1954, he worked for the Italian General Confederation of Labour, becoming a leading figure in its agricultural work. In 1960, he moved to Prague to become the general secretary of the Trade Union International of Agricultural, Forestry and Plantation Workers.

Galetti returned to Bologna in 1964, resuming his activity in the PCI, and was elected to the municipal council, spending some time leading the party group. In 1966, he became secretary of the Bologna Communist Federation and to the central committee of the PCI. In 1974, he was elected as president of the National Co-operative and Mutual League.

Galetti left the local council in 1975 and became vice-president of the national government commission on co-operation. In 1986, he was appointed to the board of governors of the University of Bologna. He died suddenly in 1987.

Trade union offices
Preceded by Ilio Bosi	General Secretary of the Trade Union International of Agricultural, Forestry and Plantation Workers; 1960–1964	Succeeded by Umberto Fornari
