= Trade Union International of Agroalimentary, Food, Commerce, Textile & Allied Industries =

TUI of Agroalimentary, Food, Commerce, Textile and Allied Industries
- Union internationale syndicale des travailleurs de l'agriculture, alimentation, commerce, textiles et industries similaires
- Founded: 1997
- Headquarters: Montreuil Cedex, France
- Location: International
- Key people: Aliou Ndiaye (Gen Sec); Julien Huck (President)
- Affiliations: WFTU

The Trade Union International of Agroalimentary, Food, Commerce, Textile and Allied Industries (French: Union internationale syndicale des travailleurs de l'agriculture, alimentation, commerce, textiles et industries similaires, UISTAACT) is one of ten Trade Union Internationals of the World Federation of Trade Unions (WFTU).

== History ==
The union was formed in 1997 by the merger of the Trade Union International of Agricultural, Forestry and Plantation Workers, Trade Union International of Food, Tobacco, Hotel and Allied Industries Workers, Trade Union International of Workers in Commerce, Trade Union International of Textile, Leather and Fur Workers Unions. All of these TUIs were founded in 1949, except the Commerce Workers which was founded in 1959.
