= Italian Federation of Agroindustrial Workers =

Trade union of Italy

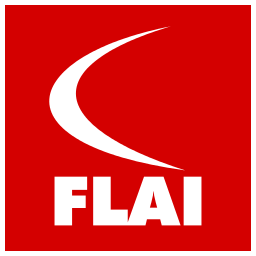
Logo of the union

The Italian Federation of Agroindustrial Workers (Italian: Federazione Lavoratori Agro Industria, FLAI) is a trade union representing workers in the food and agriculture sectors in Italy.

The union was founded in 1988, when the National Federation of Italian Agricultural Labourers and Employees merged with the Italian Federation of Sugar, Food Industry and Tobacco Workers. Like its predecessors, it affiliated to the Italian General Confederation of Labour. By 1998, it had 314,552 members, of whom 79% worked in agriculture, and the remainder in food.

== General Secretaries ==
- 1988: Angelo Lana
- 1992: Gianfranco Benzi
- 2000: Franco Chiriaco
- 2008: Stefania Crogi
- 2016: Ivana Galli
- 2019: Giovanni Mininni
