= Italian Federation of Textile Workers =

Trade union of Italy

The Italian Federation of Textile Workers (Italian: Federazione Italiana Operai Tessili, FIOT) was a trade union representing workers in textile manufacturing and processing in Italy.

The union was founded on 28 April 1901, when a wide variety of local trade unions formed the National Federation of the Textile Arts. It launched a journal, The Textile Arts, and its membership increased from 4,000 at foundation, to 20,000 by the end of the year. It launched an unsuccessful campaign for a maximum 10 hour working day. Its campaign to limit child labour was more successful, achieving a ban on under-12s in 1902, and under-14s in 1905. It also achieved statutory maternity leave.

In 1904, the union renamed itself as the Italian Confederation of Textile Arts, and soon affiliated to the new General Confederation of Labour. It achieved little in the remainder of the decade, heavily divided between reformists and revolutionary syndicalists. In 1911, it became the Italian Federation of Textile Workers, and it grew rapidly during World War I, the industry growing and the union securing pay increases. From 1917, it agreed not to undertake strikes, in exchange for being included in compulsory collective bargaining.

From 1925, the Fascist government prohibited the union from having a formal role in representation or bargaining, and it was banned in 1934. It was re-established in February 1945, and affiliated to the new Italian General Confederation of Labour. It soon moved its headquarters to Milan. By 1947, it had 500,000 members, out of a total of 600,000 working in the industry. In 1947, Teresa Noce became the first woman to lead a major Italian trade union.

Although the social democrats and Christian democrats soon left to form their own, rival, unions, the majority of workers remained, and by 1949, the union had 350,000 members. Employment in the sector declined over the following decades, and by 1965, membership was down to 118,812. In 1966, it merged with the Italian Federation of Garment Workers, to form the Italian Federation of Textile and Garment Workers.

== General Secretaries ==
1945: Domenico Marchioro
1947: Teresa Noce
1955: Lina Fibbi
