= Argentina Altobelli =

Italian trade unionist (1866–1942)

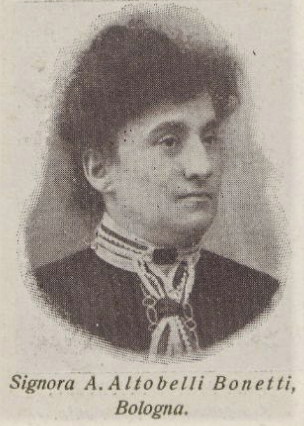
Altobelli in about 1904

Argentina Altobelli (2 July 1866 – 26 September 1942) was an Italian trade unionist, the first woman to lead a trade union in the country.

Born in Imola as Argentina Bonetti, Altobelli joined a youth group while in Parma, led by Agostino Berenini, in support of the views of Giuseppe Mazzini. She met Andrea Costa and was inspired to become a socialist. She moved to Bologna and married Abdon Altobelli, a fellow socialist. She organised a trade union for women workers, and was elected to the executive of the trades council.

In 1901, Altobelli was a founder member of the National Federation of Agricultural Workers (Federterra), and in 1906, she was elected as its national secretary, the first woman to lead an Italian trade union representing both men and women. She attended the International Women's Congress in Amsterdam in 1904, as a delegate of the Italian Women's Alliance. She also joined the Italian Socialist Party (PSI), and in 1908 was elected to the party's executive.

As leader of Federterra, Altobelli campaigned for land nationalisation, and set up employment offices and co-operatives for union members. From 1912, she served on the Superior Labor Council at the Ministry of Agriculture and Commerce, and also became a director of the National Accident Fund. In 1920, she participated in the congress which founded the International Landworkers' Federation.

Altobelli was on the reformist wing of the PSI, and in 1922 joined the Unitary Socialist Party split. Under pressure from fascists, she left Bologna and moved to Rome. In 1924, Mussolini offered her the position of under secretary of agriculture, hoping to bring reformist socialists onside, but she rejected the position.

Federterra was banned in 1926, and Altobelli took jobs out of the public eye, campaigning for workers but facing increasing poverty. She died in 1942.
