= Industrial Union of Transport and Communication =

East German trade union

The Industrial Union of Transport and Communication (German: Industriegewerkschaft Transport und Nachrichtenwesen, IG TuN) was a trade union representing workers in the transport and communication sectors in East Germany.

In 1958, the Free German Trade Union Federation (FDGB) had rearranged its affiliates, and formed the Industrial Union of Energy, Post and Transport (IG EPT), in line with the national economic plan. However, the new union covered fields which were structured in very different ways. As a result, in 1963, the FDGB again restructured. The IG EPT was dismantled, and its communication and transportation sections were merged with the Industrial Union of Railways, forming the "Industrial Union of Transport and Communication".

By 1964, the new union had 600,000 members, making it the fourth largest FDGB affiliate. Internationally, it was affiliated to the Trade Union International of Transport Workers.

The union continued to grow, and by 1989, it had 799,480 members. In December, it decided to prepare to merge with West German unions by dividing itself into sections which aligned with those unions. In February 1990, the Union of Railway Workers was split off, followed by the Industrial Union of Transport, and finally in March, the remainder of members became the German Postal Union.

== President ==
1963: Karl Iffländer
1977: Karl Kalauch
