= National Federation of Sharecroppers =

Agriculture trade union

The National Federation of Sharecroppers (Italian: Federazione Nazionale Coloni e Mezzadri, Federmezzadri) was a trade union representing agricultural workers who farmed a piece of land in exchange for paying a share of their income to its owner.

From 1901, the National Federation of Agricultural Workers (Federterra) represented all agricultural workers. It was affiliated to the Italian General Confederation of Labour (CGIL), which was keen for the union to distinguish between agricultural labourers and sharecroppers, due to their differing rights and economic positions.

In 1947, the National Federation of Sharecroppers was split out of Federterra, becoming a distinct union which affiliated to both Federterra and CGIL. Officially founded at a conference in Siena, it represented agricultural workers who fell into two specific legal positions, "mezzadri" and "coloni", both of which can be loosely translated as "sharecroppers". Unlike other CGIL unions, Federmezzadri retained most of its social and Christian democratic members.

By 1954, the union had 543,806 members, but this gradually fell, as left-wing government encouraged people to move away from sharecropping to other forms of employment contract. By 1977, it was down to 62,706 members. That year, CGIL decided that it would focus on representing employees, and Federmezzadri left, merging with the Italian Farmers' Alliance and the Farmers' Union, to form the Italian Confederation of Farmers.

== General Secretaries ==
1947: Ettore Borghi
1960: Doro Francisconi
1967: Renato Ognibene
1971: Afro Rossi
