= Italian Federation of Sugar, Food Industry and Tobacco Workers =

Trade union of Italy

The Italian Federation of Sugar, Food Industry and Tobacco Workers (Italian: Federazione Italiana Lavoratori Zuccheriero Industria Alimentare e Tabacco, FILZIAT) was a trade union representing food processing workers in Italy.

The union was founded in 1960, when the Italian Federation of Food Industry Workers merged with the Italian Federation of Sugar and Alcohol Industry Employees, and the National Union of Tobacco. Like all its predecessors, it affiliated to the Italian General Confederation of Labour. By 1965, the union had about 85,000 members.

By 1987, the union had 91,148 members. In 1988, it union merged with the National Federation of Italian Agricultural Labourers and Employees, to form the Italian Federation of Agroindustrial Workers.

== General Secretaries ==
1960: Vincenzo Ansanelli
1965: Claudio Truffi
1969: Andrea Gianfagna
1981: Andrea Amaro
