= Prostitution in Italy =

Prostitution in Italy (Italian: prostituzione), defined as the exchange of sexual acts for money, is legal, although organized prostitution, whether indoors in brothels or controlled by third parties, is prohibited. Brothels were banned in 1958. A euphemism often used to refer to street prostitutes in Italy is Lucciole (lit. "fireflies"), while escorts are referred to as Squillo (onomatopoeia referring to the sound of a ringing telephone, making it analogous to "call girl").

== History ==
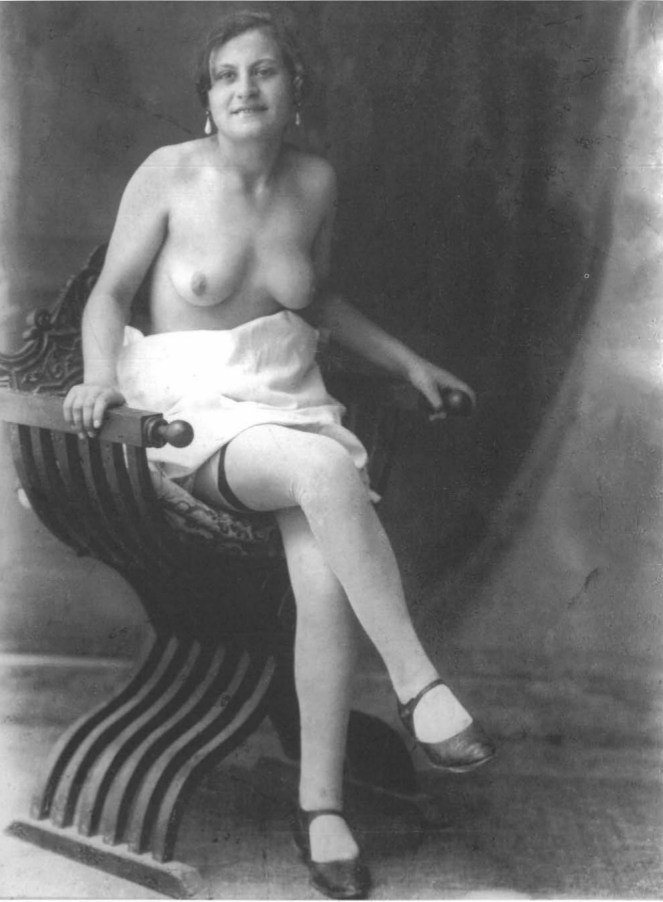
Prostitute in a brothel of Treviso in the 1920s

Prostitution thrived in Italy in the Middle Ages. The city of Venice declared in 1358 that brothels were indispensable, and courtesans (Cortigiana onesta) achieved high social status in Venice, particularly in the 17th century.

=== Regolamentazione ===
The Regolamentazione, or the regulation system of prostitution, was established in 1861, with Italian unification, modeled on the French Napoleonic system of Réglementation and the Bureau des Moeurs (a government office tasked with regulating vice, which included officially registering prostitutes). An 1859 decree, by Count Camillo Benso di Cavour to aid the French army which supported the Piedmontese in their fight against Austria, authorized the opening of houses controlled by the state for the exercise of prostitution in Lombardy. On 15 February 1860, the decree was signed into law (referred to as Legge Cavour) with the enactment of the "Regulations of the Security Service on Prostitution".

A further law (Legge Crispi), adopted on 29 March 1888, prohibited the selling of food and drinks, and parties, dances, and songs in brothels, and banned such establishments near places of worship, schools, and kindergartens. It also provided that the shutters should always remain closed, which is the origin of the Italian expression "closed houses" (case chiuse). A further amendment was the Legge Nicotera of 1891. Under this system, prostitution in Italy was fully legal in private houses. A system of sifilicomi (hospitals for people/women in prostitution) was also set up, under the belief that they were the main sources of spreading venereal diseases.

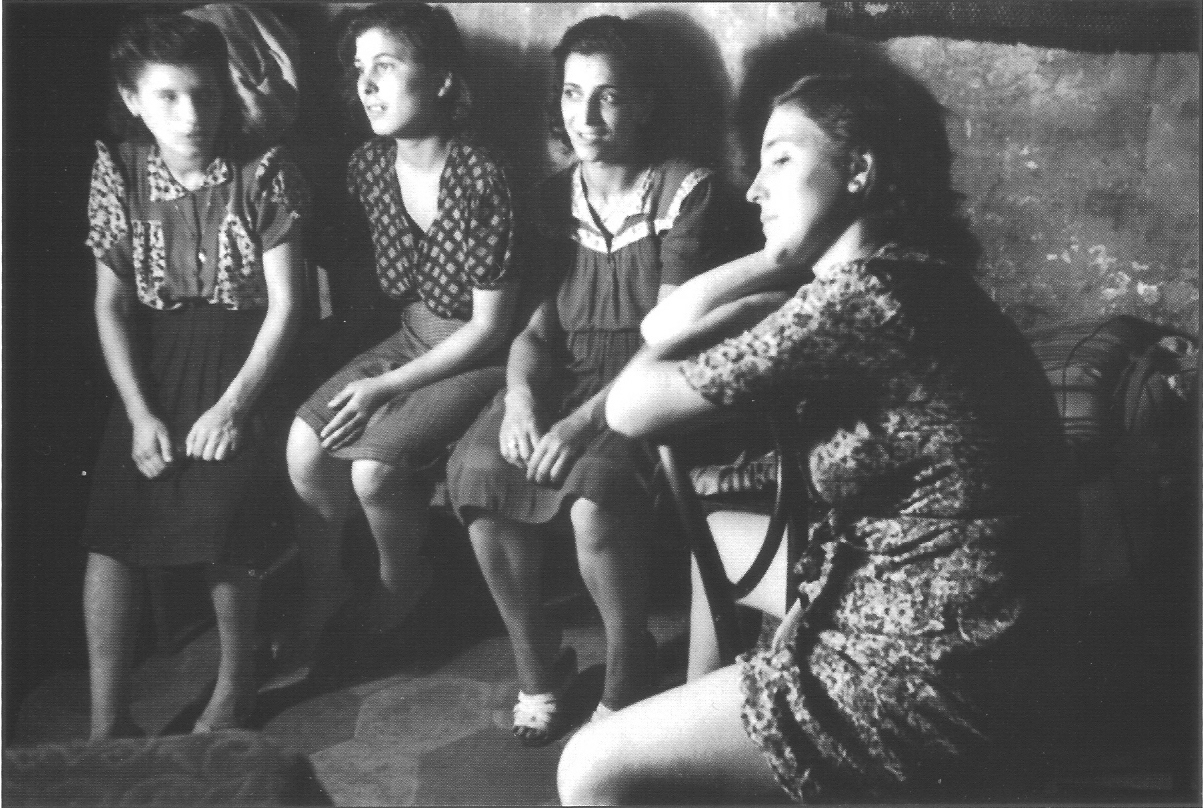
Prostitutes waiting for customers in a brothel of Naples in 1945

Although prostitutes found this regulated system oppressive, they developed ways to resist it. During the Fascist rule (1922–1943), more restrictive measures were gradually introduced in 1923, 1933, and 1940.

Overall, the system was considered a failure, and as in other European countries with Réglementation, movement for its abolition started to grow from the late 19th century, supported by leftist and feminist groups. This abolitionism of the time is often considered confusing, since it has been applied to both the abolition of regulations restricting prostitution and the abolition of prostitution itself. However, these forces led to the introduction of a new system in Italy that abolished regulation, but not prostitution as such.

=== Legge Merlin (1958) ===
The Legge Merlin (L75/1958) (the Merlin Law, named after its main author, the Socialist Party member of parliament Lina Merlin), came into power on 20 September 1958. This law, still in force today, with very little changes, revoked the regulation system, banned brothels, and established a new criminal offence called "exploitation of prostitution" (sfruttamento della prostituzione), with the aim to punish procuring of sexual services. Specifically, article 3.8 provides penalties for "any person who, in any way, promotes or exploits the prostitution of others" (chiunque in qualsiasi modo favorisca o sfrutti la prostituzione altrui). Article 3.3 lists a number of public places where prostitution is prohibited, such as houses, hotels, dance halls, and entertainment clubs. Article 5 prohibits solicitation (libertinaggio) "in a public place, or place open to the public, or soliciting in a scandolous or disturbing manner, or follows a person and invites them by acts or words". Article 7 prohibited registration and mandatory health checks for prostitutes.

==== Theory ====
The Merlin Law follows the standard abolitionist (abolishing regulation) view of prostitution control policy, prohibiting trafficking, exploitation, and aiding and abetting of prostitution. What remained legal was street prostitution, or independent prostitution done by a prostitute in their own home. The law was promoted as an equality measure liberating women, but despite its good intentions to give more rights to prostitutes otherwise dependent on pimps, it was, and still remains to this day, a subject of intense debate. Among other points, the text of the law specifically refers to women (donne).

==== Result ====
The effect of the law was to push women out into the streets, which made them more visible, and into private homes. The law remained a subject of intense debate, with its defence being seen as a feminist issue, as some Marxists and most Catholics support it. The Christian Democrats repeatedly sought the repeal of the law since 1973, and they were joined in 1998 by the Democrats of the Left. Repeal of the law would have re-opened brothels. At the same time, conservative women's groups such as Federcasalinghe pushed for more regulation, including as health checks, but these propositions were opposed by feminists. However, surveys consistently suggest that there is considerable public support for re-opening the case chiuse.

Following the founding of the Comitato (see Advocacy, below), attempts to change the law continued, with 22 bills introduced in the 1996-2001 legislative assembly.

==== Growing concerns over street prostitution and migration ====
===== Migration =====
Prostitution in Italy became much more visible in the early 1990s with the increase of migration from Western Africa which had begun in the 1970s. The dissolution of the Soviet Union, the Yugoslav Wars, and new immigration policies (such as Legge Martelli of 1990) contributed to a rapid influx of people in prostitution in 1989-1990 originating from former Soviet bloc countries. A second wave of immigrant people/women in prostitution from Nigeria and Peru, arriving to Italy using tourist visas and staying in the country after they had expired (the so-called clandestini) ensued, followed by a third wave from Albania in 1993–1994. The fourth wave in 1995 also came from Nigeria and Albania, while in 1996–1998, even more migrants came from Moldova, Lithuania, and Albania. Italian immigration laws became much more restrictive in 1998, with the enactment of the Legge Turco-Napolitano (40/98).

Among these migrants were women who took up prostitution with varying degrees of voluntarity, with some suffering coercion and debt bondage (human trafficking), including under-aged girls. These issues of foreign nationals, coerced prostitution, and under-aged prostitutes have re-shaped the prostitution debate in Italy, as elsewhere around Europe, in recent years. Descriptions of the conditions of migrant women, particularly young women, on the streets, shifted the debate in the 1990s from the Comitato's perception of prostitutes as independent and assertive women to that of victims of male violence. One response of the local authorities in dealing with the problem was rescinding residence permits issued to foreign women found in the streets, and increased deportations of the clandestini.

===== Street prostitution =====
With migration, street prostitution became more visible, the prostitutes being considered to now be mainly foreigners. In turn, this created another force driving public attitudes, which were community groups from urban neighbourhoods where street prostitution was most visible, particularly since the mid-1990s. Municipalities have also tried to police people in prostitution themselves since 1994, which included targeting prostitution clients by sending notices to their home addresses and confiscating their vehicles, although outright charging clients with aiding and abetting was blocked by a tribunal in Perugia in September 2000. Continuing police activity became a national focus following the suicide of a client that year.

Another initiative was to create tolerance zones, such as in Mestre, the mainland of Venice, in 1995. A more tolerant approach has emerged from local authorities, based on the principle of "harm reduction" ("riduzione del danno").

Some municipal authorities have created confusion by erecting signs drawing attention to prostitution occurring in the neighbourhood.

==== Dealing with immigration ====
Originally proposed by international agencies, and approved by the European Union in 1996, the cause of protecting migrant prostitutes was taken up in Italy by Maria Paola Colombo Svevo (PPI), President of Irene, an NGO, and by other Catholic and lay NGOs such as Caritas.

While it was always possible to request a residency permit on humanitarian grounds, this was not well known or utilized by foreign people in prostitution. In 1996, Livia Turco, the Minister of Social Affairs, introduced the first "Justice Permit" for trafficking victims who renounced their traffickers, as part of the Prime Minister Lamberto Dini's immigration decree. However, Catholic organizations opposed the denunciation clause. The political initiative to address the situation of women migrants came from Anna Finocchiaro (Democratic Party), the Minister of Equal Opportunities. Giorgio Napolitano (Democrats of the Left), the Interior Minister, announced new measures in 1997 to deal with prostitution as an issue of urban safety, and there was little debate over his proposals, given widespread concerns over human trafficking. The main opposing viewpoint was that residence permits should be granted only on the condition of victims denouncing traffickers. What debate there was, was essentially confined to the position of women. The resulting legislation was the Legge Turco-Napolitano of 1998 (40/98). The position of the relatively weak and scattered women's movement was that victims should not be further victimized by having them expelled to their home country, or by putting them in a possibly life-threatening situation.

Measures adopted by the law included increased penalties for recruiting and trafficking, and allowing victims of trafficking to stay in the country under a "protection permit". The law envisioned that these permits would be administered by local police chiefs (questori) on humanitarian grounds, but this concerned NGOs because of the complexity of the procedures involved and the potential for abuse. The law also required the victim to enroll in training courses organized and by approved NGOs. The law also allocated funds for associations assisting these victims, but did require them to exit prostitution, although they were supposed to denounce it. The requirement for denunciation in the original Dini decree was removed. In advocating this, Turco was influenced by the Commission for Equal Opportunities, whose first president, Elena Marinucci (PSI), had embraced the aims of the Comitato and attempted to legislate this in 1987.

Amongst critics were the Comitato who objected to prostitution as something that women required to be protected from, without addressing stigmatization. However, Catholic organizations dominated the list of approved agencies, and followed this belief. However, the debates did distinguish between forced prostitution and a "free and conscious choice of the individual".

===== Effect =====
Although the law was not explicitly targeted at prostitution, its implementation was. Despite gender neutral language, the implementation focused on young female victims of trafficking, which was driven by populist media imagery. The new law did little to stem the debate. When the government led by Massimo D'Alema was elected later that year in October 1998 three women ministers from three political parties (Federation of the Greens, Italian People's Party, and Democrats of the Left) - Laura Balbo (Equal Opportunities), Rosa Russo Jervolino (Internal Affairs) and Livia Turco (Social Affairs) announced they would look at new proposals on battling trafficking and defending the dignity of women.

The result was a new prominence for Anna Finocchiaro's consultative body, the Inter-ministerial Table for the Fight against Trafficking (in February 1998) with wide representation. Finocchiaro had declared "Trafficking in women is a new and very serious problem that we have to combat primarily with the punishment for reduction into slavery, instead of using the Merlin law". In March 1999, the ministers announced new, more severe, penalties for exploitation, and new rules for protecting those who renounced prostitution. Available statistics for 1998 reported 342 known victims, 37 percent of whom were minors, predominantly originating from Albania, Nigeria and FR Yugoslavia. A total of 242 permits were granted in 1999 and 600 in 2000.

=== Legge Carfagna proposal ===
Until 2008, although there were no laws against street prostitution, other laws concerning public order and decency could be used to regulate it, and some places had local ordinances enacted against street prostitution. Attempts were regularly made to criminalize outdoor prostitution.

==== Bill 1079 ====
In 2008, a new bill outlawing street prostitution was introduced by Mara Carfagna, Minister for Equal Opportunities, and approved by the Consiglio dei ministri on 11 September.

==== Scope ====
The bill is framed as an amendment to the Legge Merlin of 20 February 1958, No 75 by providing for penalties for the act of prostitution, solicitation, or availing oneself of sexual services in a place open to the public (Art. 1). Article 2 amends article 600 bis of the penal code to provide penalties for recruiting, inducing, promoting, using, managing, organizing, controlling, or profiting from the sexual services of a person under 18, or for those promising any kind reward for a sexual act with a person between 14 and 18. It also provides for repatriation of foreign minors engaging in prostitution. Article 3 deals with organized crime, penalizing conspiracy to exploit prostitution via article 416 of the penal code. Article 4 provides no new resources and repeals article 5 of the Legge Merlin, which it replaces, prohibiting libertinaggio (solicitation constituting offence or harassment) subject to up to 15 days imprisonment.

==== Legislative history ====
The bill (S.1079) was introduced into the Senate, where it has been debated in committee in conjunction with a group of related bills (19 March 2009). In interviews with Gente and Panorama, Carfagna stated that she was declaring war on prostitution and criticised opponents who proposed quartieri a luci rosse (red light districts). It remains firmly on the agenda of the Berlusconi government, despite the prostitution scandals that continue to be associated with him. This has been achieved by packaging anti-prostitution measures into security packages, frustrated by the slow passage of the actual legislation. As with previous attempts this has attracted much criticism.

==== Opposition ====
The bill is opposed by the Catholic Church, people in prostitution harm reduction advocates feminist groups, human rights and immigrant groups, and lawyers and continues to be a matter of both popular and academic debate. Carfagna believes it is necessary to combat trafficking.

=== 2008 ordinances ===
The Domestic Security regulations of 24 July 2008 (L.125/08) gave mayors judicial power to declare anything that might endanger the security and decorum of their cities an emergency. Under these powers, people/women in prostitution and clients have been subjected to ordinances that permit municipal police to administer fines. The Public Security Law enables police chiefs to expel persons from a city in which they do not officially reside. EU citizens are subject to fines while non-EU citizens may be placed in detention centres and deported. The Comitato reports a breakdown in relationships between NGOs and authorities and between NGOs and people/women in prostitution, an avoidance of health services and an increase in criminal activity. While enforcement varies by region and over time, the immediate effect has been the expected and desired one of clearing the streets (at least temporarily) and displacing people/women in prostitution to remote areas. Indoors prostitution has increased, and quality of life in general has deteriorated. Unprotected sex has increased due to reduced ability to negotiate. Stigmatization and vulnerability have increased, as has a greater reliance on social services. As noted in other countries, as soon as police activity is reduced, older prostitution patterns reappear. On 7 April 2011, the Italian Constitutional Court with the Sentence n. 115/2011 decided that this kind of Mayors' Ordinances must have time and space limits and urgent conditions to be issued. So, the simple exercise of street prostitution could be no more persecuted by this kind of local bills.

== Legal status ==
Prostitution is legal (it is not mentioned in the Penal Code), and brothels and pimping are illegal. Single people/women in prostitution from apartments are "tolerated". Loitering is permitted, but soliciting ("unabashedly inviting clients on the street") is illegal. Migrants with work or residence permits may be in prostitution, and police cannot revoke residence permits and begin deportation procedures.

Work permits can be issued to migrant dancers in entertainment clubs for one year in a single workplace. Prostitution is forbidden, but nude dancing is tolerated. Suspicions of sexual encounters lead to club closures. Under a fiscal law passed in 2006 (art. 36 paragraph 34 bis of Law 248/2006), prostitution has been taxed in the same way as any other legal money earned, as confirmed by the Highest Court multiple times. The last one of these Judgments was carried out in 2016 (n. 22413/2016), and people working in prostitution must have their activity registered, paying taxes as do all free professionals.

The European Parliament resolution of 14 September 2023 on the regulation of prostitution in the EU: its cross-border implications and impact on gender equality and women's rights (2022/2139(INI)) stated that the "UN and EU agreed-upon language is prostitution and people/women in prostitution".

=== Case law ===
A 2010 court decision created a new precedent that clients who did not pay the person in prostitution would be considered guilty of rape. This was considered a major breakthrough for prostitutes' rights.

== Theoretical discourses ==
The three main debates which have occupied the public, media, and policy makers are

- Allowing victims of trafficking to stay in the country (see Immigration)
- Criminalization of clients of prostituted children under 18 (see Underage workers)
- Assisting people/women in prostitution, including victims of trafficking. (see Assisting migrant sex workers)

According to a TAMPEP report on the legislations and policies regarding prostitution in Europe, in Italy, the dominant frames are prostitution as violence, force, organized crime, a threat to public security and order, and driving demand for migration and trafficking.

=== Actors ===
Amongst the political actors were the Centri antiviolenza (Anti-violence centres), and women's shelters who advocated for victims of trafficking to stay in the country even if they did not denounce their exploiters, in keeping with their vision that women are best empowered by allowing them to determine their own course of action.

The women's movement has been divided between those who saw prostitution as exploitation and those who saw it as work. In general, the movement has not prioritized prostitution, giving it mid-level importance, and saw it as a cultural issue, and did not trust the State as an intervenor. On this issue, Catholic organizations have been part of a hostile backlash to feminism, as is the fascist right. For example, the mayor of Bologna cut all funding to women's shelters.

The women's movement denounced prostitution.

The policy of fining clients of street prostitutes, which has started to be implemented in the early 1990s, by city mayors, has been approved by part of the feminist movement (blaming clients for the existence of prostitution is a common discourse among both feminists and Catholics), but opposed by other women who felt this policy further victimized the women.

Amongst the ongoing debates surrounding prostitution in Italy are the legal scholars who advocate "diritto leggero", the concept that the State should intervene only minimally in matters considered the free choice of the individual. There was a trend towards supporting normalization. A prominent advocate for this position has been Roberta Tatafiore, chief editor of Noidonne ("Us Women").

In regard to legal issues, feminists in general have supported the Merlin law, which banned brothels and regulation; and stood for decriminalization, with the exception of exploitation by third parties (pimps).

In the centre-left government of Prodi, the policy system was reasonably open, and the dominant approach matched that of the women's movement, in moving ahead with "protection".

=== Clients ===
The shift in emphasis from people in prostitution to clients in 1994, when mayors ordered police to fine clients, was welcomed by Catholics and feminists. In Bologna in 1998, the Case delle donne per non-subire violenze, the Comitato, and MIT, a transsexual organization, left the city's co-ordinating committee on prostitution in protest, believing that any repression worsened people in prostitution conditions. There was also a feeling that criminalizing clients prevented them reporting abuse or collaborating with authorities.

The issue was raised again in 1999 by Jervolino, proposing amending the Merlin Law to stiffen penalties for exploitation. Giuliano Amato, Minister of Institutional Reforms, suggested that instead the client should be penalized, and Antonio Di Pietro (Lista Di Pietro) introduced a bill into the Senate, but raised the ire of politicians, in particular Livia Turco, who emphasised that prostitution should be decriminalized, and only "true abuse" be penalized. She and Laura Balbo also received representation from the Comitato against this. This debate occurred during meetings of a parliamentary commission into prostitution, where there were frequent references to under-age foreign prostitutes.

==== Underage prostitution (L. 269/98) ====
Partly connected to this was the emergence of a need to criminalize clients using under-age people/women in prostitution. Engaging in sexual activity with someone under 14 was already classified as statutory rape, but that still left many under-age people/women in prostitution. While the age of consent is 14, paying to engage in sexual activities with teenagers between 14 and 17 years old, regardless of consent, is a crime punished with imprisonment from one to six years. Reports of underage people/women in prostitution has been a persistent concern in Italy as elsewhere, although in Italy it often appeared framed as homosexual molestation of male minors.

In 1996, two female politicians, Anna Serafini and Daria Bonfietti (DS), introduced legislation to penalize the use of under-age people/women in prostitution, responding to a series of international forces, including Programme of Action Against Sexual Exploitation of Children for Commercial Purposes (Stockholm 1996), UNESCO, and ECPAT. They received the support of Rosa Russo Jervolino, Minister of Internal Affairs. This initiative unified a number of legislative proposals.

The media reported abuse and murders (particularly an 8-year-old boy in Ostia in 1998,) internet child pornography and sex tourism, with the terminology shifting from 'teenager' to 'child', and frequently conflated 'women and children' as equally vulnerable. Parliament responded rapidly and the Penal Code was amended to deal with sexual contact with minors or possession of child pornography with no opposition.

There was, however, division over the issue of the defence of ignorance, the final decision being it was not a defence. One feminist MP, Ersilia Salvato (RC), complained about the rushed legislation, and abstained. Because Italian law prohibits gender discrimination (another legacy of Lina Merlin), the language was neutral, although not the effect. It was, however, considered impossible to enforce, since it would require the person in prostitution to lay the complaint. The issue was never on the agenda of the women's movement, not even by the shelters, and who played no part in the debate, nor did the Equal Opportunities Minister (Anna Finocchiaro). Nor was the policy environment receptive to feminist input, since the Government was anxious to be seen to be responding to media and moral panic on pedophilia.

Alessandra Mussolini’s husband was scheduled to appear at court for a child prostitution trial in 2015. In 2013, around 50 men—among them professionals, priests, and politicians—were accused of paying two teenage girls from Parioli, aged 14 and 15, for sexual services in Rome. The Italian Netflix series Baby is loosely based on the real-life story of the two high school girls in Rome involved in an underage prostitution ring (the "Baby Squillo" scandal) in 2013–2014.

== Assisting migrant people/women in prostitution ==
In 1998, the Chamber of Deputies ordered an "Inquiry to increase knowledge about the social and sanitary aspects of prostitution" in response to concerns about foreign people/women in prostitution on the streets. Anna Finocchiaro, the Minister of Equal Opportunities, was a key player in this, as was the Justice Commission President Marida Bolognesi (DS). The Inquiry interviewed many stakeholders during six hearings, but there was relatively little representation from the women's movement. The main framework was the idea that foreigners were "invading" the streets of Italy, as a public order issue. This was a heavily gendered debate. In the end, the commission adopted three principles – harm reduction, education of clients, and the importance of upholding the Merlin law. The deliberations included proposing a law to finance local government programmes to assist people/women in prostitution with protection permits. At the same time, the three women ministers were promoting education campaigns in the countries of origin of migrant people/women in prostitution (e. g., Nigeria, Eastern Europe), while other programmes assisted police in their responsibilities regarding permits were initiated, and help lines set up, while 8 million euros were allocated to NGOs to carry out their responsibilities under article 18 of the Turco-Napolitano Act.

There was little feminist input into this discussion, with the exception of Elsa Antonioni of the Anti-violence shelter, who stressed the continuity between sex for money and sex for free, pointing to the vulnerability of people/women in prostitution civil rights (e. g., their children could be taken into care). This was not pursued, although the strong role of the Equal Opportunities Ministry can be seen as an insider women's voice.

== Advocacy ==
An influential group of people/women in prostitution is the Comitato – Committee for the Civil Rights of Prostitutes (Comitato per i Diritti Civili delle Prostitute, or CDCP), formed in 1983 in response to violent attacks on people/women in prostitution and run by Carla Corso and Pia Covre from their national offices in Pordenone. Their campaigns include trafficking prevention, people/women in prostitution rights, and campaigning for decriminalization and an end to stigmatization. Their demands saw a number of bills introduced in parliament, which, despite support from three leftist parties, were unsuccessful. However, attempts to change the law continue in parliament. The Comitato has been one of the major women's voices in prostitution debates in Italy, at least in comparison with the women's movement overall, and worked closely with the women's shelters. Their position of minimum interference was shared with both the women's movement and the policy agencies. This has only been partially successful. A frequent target has been the provisions of the Merlin Law that punish those involved, of which Livia Turco was a prominent political voice. Positioned against this cause has been the law-and-order agenda of both centre-left and centre-right coalitions.

== Demographics ==
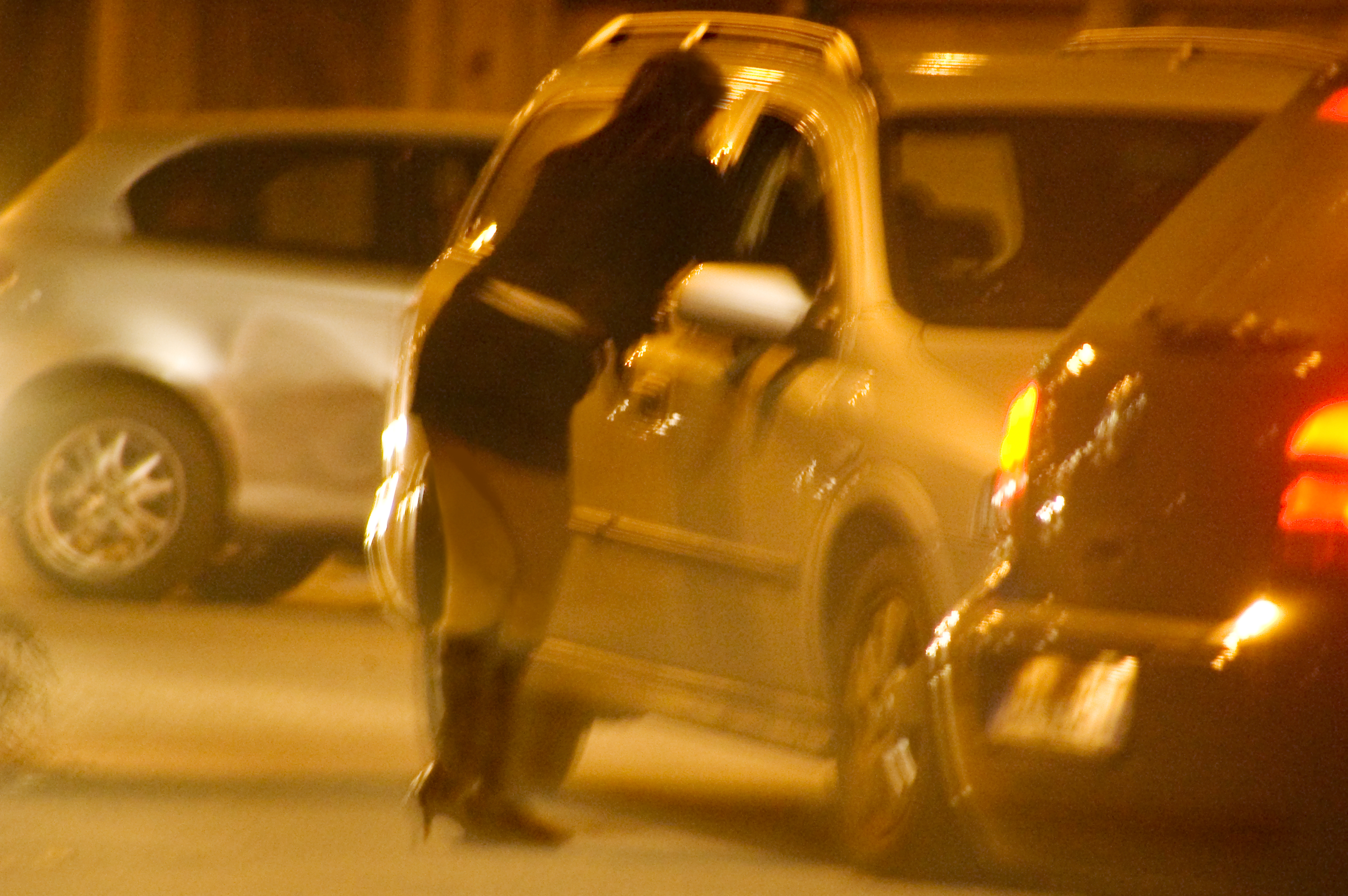
Prostitute talking to a potential customer in Turin in 2005

Accurate estimates of the numbers of people/women in prostitution in any particular country are hard to obtain, and prone to error and bias.

A 2008 report stated that were some 100,000 prostitutes in Italy. In 2007 it was stated that the total number of people in prostitution was 70,000. The Italian Statistics Institute stated the number of street people in prostitution in 1998 was 50,000.

=== Migration and tourism ===
A 2009 report from TAMPEP estimated that the percentage of foreign people/women in prostitution in Italy had reached 90%, an increase from previous years. In that report only Spain was found to have such a high percentage of migrants in the trade, although most Western European countries reported a majority of workers were migrants. This was in contrast with the former Communist countries, where the reverse is true – most people/women in prostitution being of national origin.

Claims about trafficking vary widely and are difficult to verify. Estimates vary from 7% to 100% of migrant people/women in prostitution. The 2009 US State Department report on Human Rights states "In 2008, according to the Ministry of Interior, 4,350 persons were charged with trafficking in persons and pandering."

Clampdowns by authorities often result in displacement of the trade across borders, such as that with Austria and Switzerland where brothels are legal.

=== Venues ===
In 2008, it was estimated that 65% of people in prostitution are on the streets and 35% in private residences or clubs. 20% were stated to be minors and 10% to have been forced into prostitution by criminal gangs. However lines between street and indoor prostitution are often blurred, for instance by street people/women in prostitution using vans.

== Health of people/women in prostitution ==
A 1997/1998 study of 142 street prostitutes from Rome (102 women, 40 transsexual women) showed that most respondents (95%) reported always using condoms with clients. 8% of the women and 2% of the transsexual women reported injectable drug use. 38% of the women with a stable partner used contraceptives, while 33% of them had had a voluntary abortion in the previous year. 38% of the women and 80% of the transsexual women had had checks for STDs in the last year. HIV-prevalence was 6% among women, and 20% amongst transsexual women. 4/6 positive women and 1/8 of the positive transsexual women used injectable drugs. 5/6 HIV-positive women were Italian.

However, of 558 people in prostitution attending a STD clinic in Bologna between 1995 and 1999, only 1.6% tested positive for HIV. The authors concluded that "prostitutes do not have a prominent role in the transmission and diffusion of STDs" Despite this opponents of prostitution continue to claim they are sources of disease.

== See also ==
- Love Party (Italy)
- Prostitution in ancient Rome

== Sources ==
- Mary, Mary quite contrary Italy struggles to come to grips with the Madonna-whore complex. Amanda Castleman Continental Drift Spring 2010 Archived 14 December 2009 at the Wayback Machine
- International Encyclopedia of Sexuality: Italy
- Luisa Leonini. IL SEX BUSINESS NELLA SOCIETÀ CONTEMPORANEA. Convegno Prostituzione e tratta a 50 anni dalla legge Merlin e a 10 anni dall'art. 18 D.Lgs. 286/98 Roma, 21 novembre 2008
- Piscitelli, Adriana (December 2007). "Sexo tropical em um país europeu: migração de brasileiras para a Itália no marco do 'turismo sexual' internacional" [Tropical sex in a european country: Brazilian women's migration to Italy in the frame of international sex tourism]. Revista Estudos Feministas (in Portuguese). 15 (3): 717–744. doi:10.1590/S0104-026X2007000300014. ProQuest 1957417601.
- Illegal immigration in Italy
- Social Action Department – Prostitution and Trafficking
- Feminismo a sud
- TAMPEP position on migration and sex work 2001
- The Evolution of Italian Immigration policy. Immigration legislation, 1986–2002 An inadequate policy for a major issue. European Migration Network 2003

=== Government inquiries ===
Indagine conoscitiva sugli aspetti sociali e sanitari della prostituzione, Camera dei deputati, Commissione XII (affari sociali) 1999, pp. VIII-160, Euro 6,71 (IC13022)

- Audizione del Comitato per i diritti civili delle prostitute e dei rappresentanti delle organizzazioni sindicali 1-6e documento conclusivo (28 luglio 1999)
- Audizione del Ministro per le pari opportunita' Anna Finocchiaro 16 luglio 1998
- Audizione dei rappresentanti del tavolo di coordinamento nazionale sulla prostituzione e sulla tratta, nonchè dei rappresenta 13 gennaio 1999

=== Books ===
- Sandro Bellassai, La legge del desiderio. Il progetto Merlin e l'Italia degli anni Cinquanta, Rome, Carocci 2006.
- Romano Canosa/Isabella Colonnello, Storia della prostituzione in Italia dal quattrocento alla fine del settecento, Rome 1989.
- Mary Gibson, Prostitution and the State in Italy, 1860–1915. Rutgers University Press, New Jersey 1986.
- Fernando Henriques, Prostitution and Society. Macgibbon and Kee, London 1963.
- Malte König: Der Staat als Zuhälter. Die Abschaffung der reglementierten Prostitution in Deutschland, Frankreich und Italien im 20. Jahrhundert, De Gruyter, Berlin 2016 (reviewed by Julia Brüggemann in: H-France Review, July 2017).
- Malte König: Prostitution and Infection: Transnational and Comparative Perspectives on Italian Health Policy (1922-1958), in: «Journal of Modern Italian Studies», 23.5, 2018, pp. 557–572.
- Tamar Pitch, La sessualità, le norme, lo Stato. Il dibattito sulla legge Merlin, in: «Memoria: rivista di storia delle donne», 17, 1986, pp. 24–41.
- Vittoria Serafini, Prostituzione e legislazione repubblicana: l’impegno di Lina Merlin, in: «Storia e problemi contemporanei», 10.20, 1997, pp. 105–119.
- Molly Tambor, Prostitutes and Politicians: The Women’s Rights Movement in the Legge Merlin Debates, in: Penelope Morris (ed.), Women in Italy, 1945-1960: An Interdisciplinary Study, New York, Palgrave Macmillan 2006, pp. 131–145.
- Bruno P.F. Wanrooij, "The Thorns of Love". Sexuality, Syphilis and Social Control in Modern Italy, in: Roger Davidson/Lesley A. Hall (ed.), Sex, Sin and Suffering. Veneral Disease and European Society since 1870, London/New York 2001, pp. 137–159.
