= Lina Merlin =

Italian politician (1887–1979)

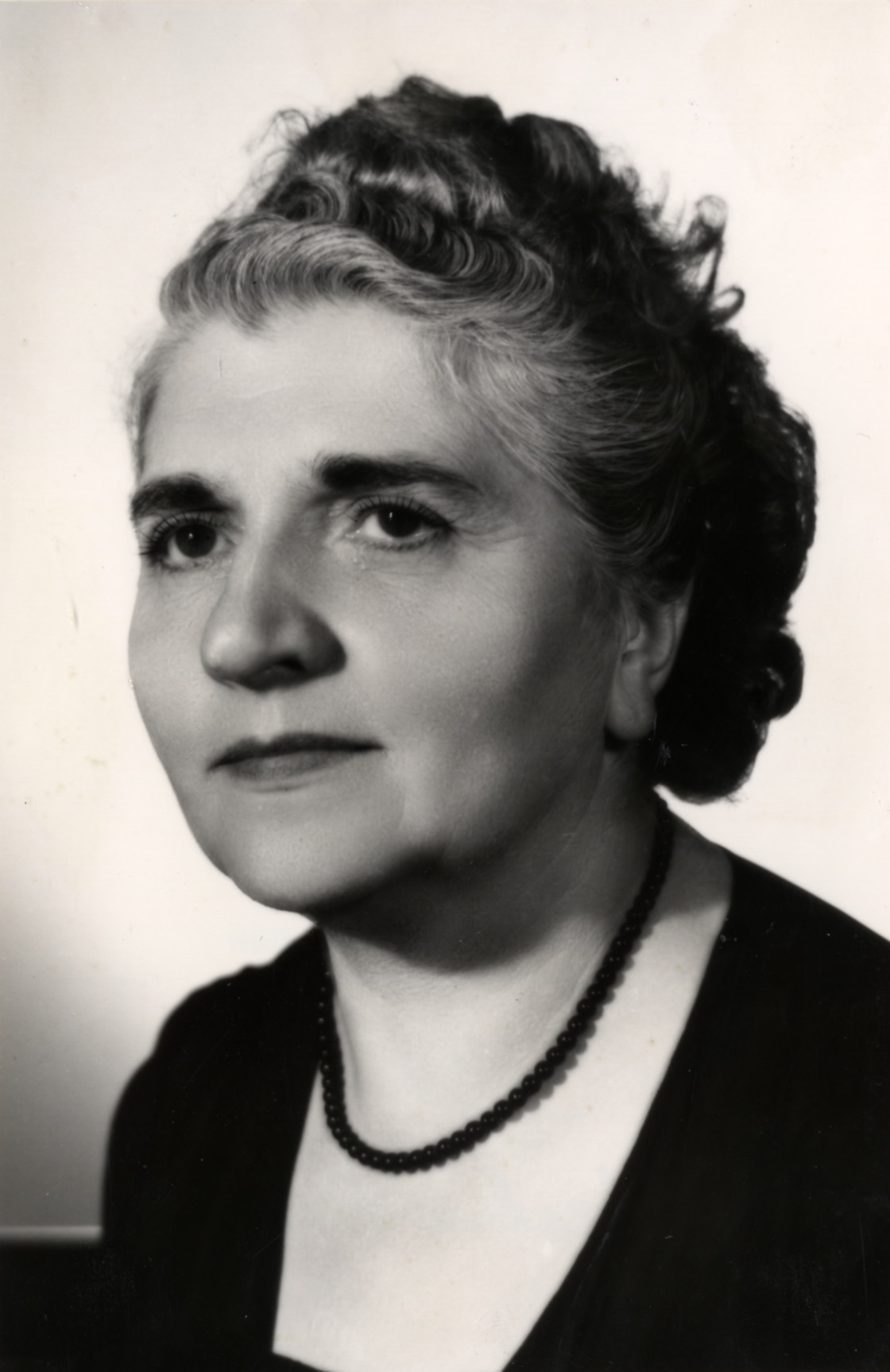
- Official portrait, 1948

Member of the Chamber of Deputies
- In office 12 June 1958 – 15 May 1963
- Constituency: Verona

Member of the Senate of the Republic
- In office 8 May 1948 – 11 June 1958
- Constituency: Veneto

Member of the Constituent Assembly
- In office 25 June 1946 – 31 January 1948
- Constituency: Italy at-large

Personal details
- Born: Angelina Merlin; 15 October 1887 Pozzonovo, Veneto, Kingdom of Italy
- Died: 16 August 1979 (aged 91) Padua, Veneto, Italy
- Party: Italian Socialist Party
- Spouse: Dante Gallani (m. 1933; died 1936)

Angelina "Lina" Merlin (15 October 1887 – 16 August 1979) was an Italian politician, perhaps best known for authoring and promoting the so-called "Merlin law" which abolished state-regulated prostitution in Italy. She was also an activist and educator, and took part in the Italian resistance movement.

The daughter of Giustina Poli, a teacher, and Fruttuoso Merlin, secretary for the municipality, she was born in Pozzonovo, and grew up in Chioggia. In 1907, she received her diploma, qualifying her to teach elementary school. In 1914, she received her qualification to teach French in middle school, but preferred to continue to teach elementary school. In March 1926, because she refused to take an oath of loyalty to Italy's Fascist government, she was removed from her teaching position. In November of that year, she was sentenced to five years in prison; her sentence was reduced, and she returned to Padua in November 1929. She moved to Milan in 1930; to support herself, she gave private lessons in French.

In 1919, she joined the Italian Socialist Party (PSI). Merlin contributed to the socialist weekly Eco dei lavoratori, and the periodical La Difesa delle lavoratrici. During World War II, she took part in the resistance against the fascists. She participated in the founding of the Gruppi di difesa della donna, women's defence groups. In 1944, she helped found the Unione donne italiane, and served three terms as its president.

In 1946, she was elected to the Constituent Assembly of Italy as a member of the PSI. She was instrumental in ensuring that the rights of women and children were protected in the new constitution. In 1948, she was elected to the Italian Senate of the Republic; she was re-elected in 1953. Merlin retired from the Socialist Party in 1961 and did not run for re-election after her term of office ended in 1963.

The bill to abolish the regulation of prostitution in Italy (Law No. 75/1958) was introduced in 1948, and, after a long and difficult process, was finally passed in early 1958 and came into effect in September of that year.

Merlin served on the Chioggia municipal council from 1951 to 1955.

She met Dante Gallani in Milan; the couple married in 1933, but Gallani died three years later.

Merlin died in Padua at the age of 91.

== Electoral history ==
Election	House	Constituency	Party	Votes	Result
1946	Constituent Assembly	Verona–Padua–Vicenza–Rovigo	PSIUP	5,914	Not elected
1946	Constituent Assembly	Italy at-large	PSIUP	– (Note: Elected in a closed list proportional representation system.)	Elected
1948	Senate of the Republic	Veneto – Adria	FDP	40,323	Elected
1953	Senate of the Republic	Veneto – Rovigo	PSI	20,209	Elected
1958	Chamber of Deputies	Verona–Padua–Vicenza–Rovigo	PSI	7,786	Elected
