= Viola Ardone =

Italian writer

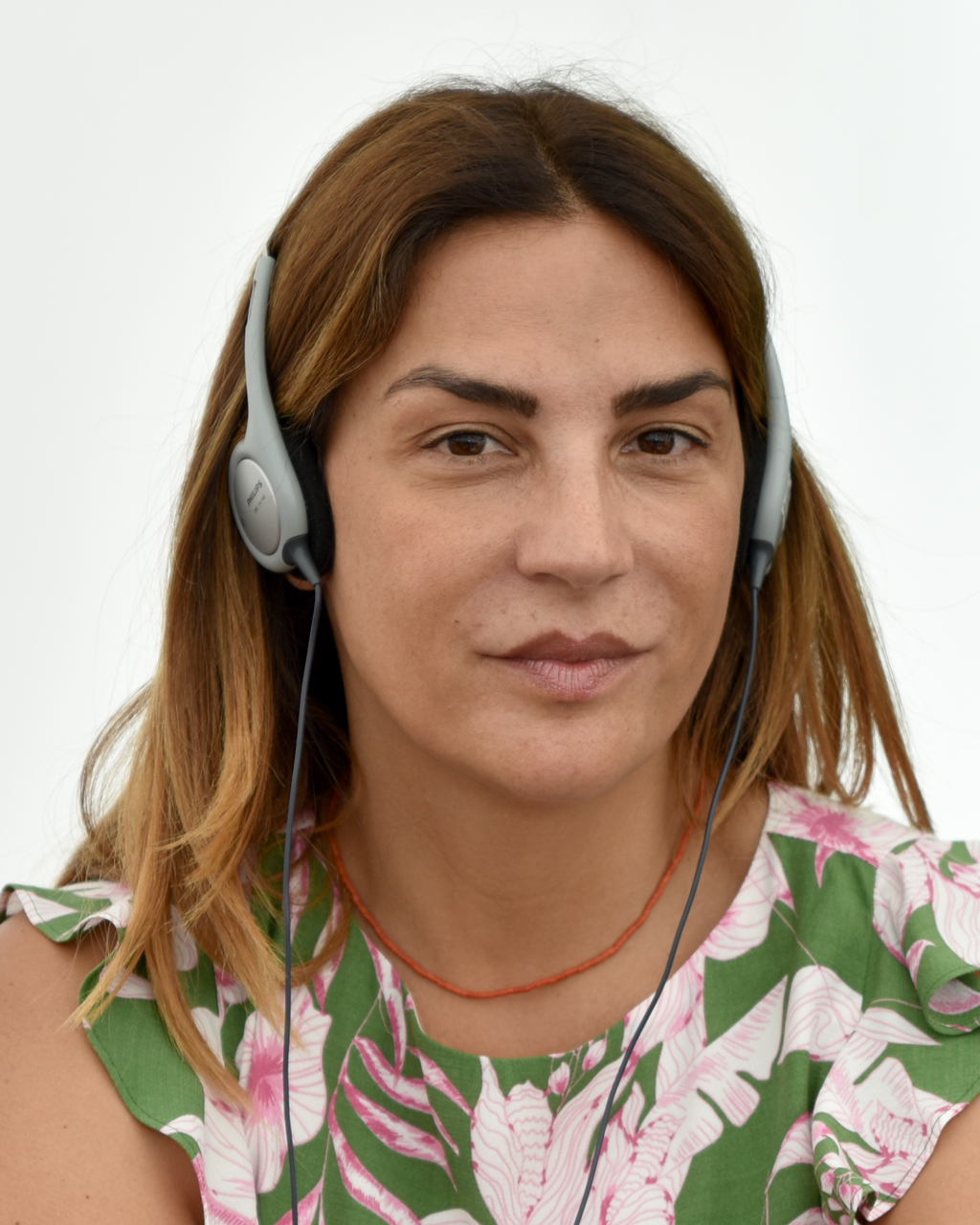
- Ardone in 2022
- Born: 2 July 1974 (age 51); Naples, Italy
- Occupation: Writer

Viola Ardone (born 2 July 1974) is an Italian novelist.

== Life and career ==
Born in Naples, Ardone studied at the liceo classico of Naples and in 1996 graduated in letters at the University of Naples Federico II. After collaborating with educational book publisher Edizioni Simone, she started working as a literature teacher.

After several short stories, Ardone made her novel debut in 2013 with La ricetta del cuore in subbuglio ("Recipe for the heart in turmoil"). She had her breakout in 2019 with The Children's Train (Italian: Il treno dei bambini), an historical novel about a family involved in the trains of happiness initiative. The novel was translated in 36 languages, and was adapted by Cristina Comencini in a Netflix original film with the same title.

Her following novel, The Unbreakable Heart of Oliva Denaro, is inspired by Franca Viola's life events.
