= Union of Trade =

German trade union

The Union of Trade, Food and Luxuries (German: Gewerkschaft Handel) was a trade union representing workers in various related industries in East Germany.

The union was founded in 1949, when the Free German Trade Union Federation (FDGB) decided to reorganise its affiliates, in line with the country's economic management plans. As a result, retail and wholesale workers from the Industrial Union of Trade and Transport and the Union of Employees were placed into a new union, the Industrial Union of Trade, which was soon renamed as the Union of Trade.

In 1958, FDGB affiliates were again reorganised, and the Industrial Union of Food, Luxuries and Hospitality was merged into the Union of Trade, which changed its name to the Union of Trade, Food and Luxuries. This made it the second-largest affiliate of the FDGB, and by 1964, it claimed 800,000 members. Internationally, it was affiliated to the Trade Union International of Workers in Commerce.

In 1968, most of the food and luxuries sections were removed to the Union of Land, Food and Forests, but the union retained catering workers, and its membership generally increased. By 1989, it had 1,053,780 members, or 12% of the total membership of the FDGB.

In January 1990, the union became independent, but in June, it decided to dissolve, with members transferred to either the Trade, Banking and Insurance Union of the DDR, or the Food, Beverages and Catering Union of the DDR.

== Presidents ==
1949: Bruno Sommerer
1952: Siegfried Michl
1954: Margarete Götzelt
1958: Charlotte Welm
1984: Hannelore Schulz
1990: Dieter Behn
