= Union of Healthcare =

Healthcare Worker's Union in East Germany

The Union of Healthcare (German: Gewerkschaft Gesundheitswesen) was a trade union representing healthcare workers in East Germany.

The first Union of Healthcare was formed in 1949, when the Free German Trade Union Federation decided to split healthcare workers out of the Industrial Union of Public Companies and Administration. In addition to industrial activities, the union became involved in sports associations, their names starting with "SV Medizin".

In 1958, the union was merged into the Union of Government Administration, Healthcare and Finance (Sta-Ge-Fi), but this proved unsuccessful, and in 1961, the Union of Healthcare was re-established. By 1964, it had 250,000 members, and by 1989, this had grown to 648,144.

The union became independent in January 1990, and renamed itself as the Union of Health and Social Care. Its new president, Siegmar Treibmann, argued that it should merge into the German Salaried Employees' Union, but the majority of the union voted instead to join the Public Services, Transport and Traffic Union (ÖTV). Treibmann resigned, and the union dissolved itself in October, recommending that members transferred to the ÖTV.

== Presidents ==
1949: Hugo Gräf
1951: Gertrud Grothe
1954: Eva Gatzek
1955: Robert Ganse
1958: Part of Sta-Ge-Fi
1961: Robert Hans-Georg Großmann
1968: Elfriede Schneeweiß
1990: Siegmar Treibmann
1990: Richard Klatt
