= Trade Union International of Textile, Leather and Fur Workers Unions =

The Trade Union International of Textile, Leather and Fur Workers Unions was a trade union international affiliated with the World Federation of Trade Unions.

== History ==
The Trade Union International of Textile, Leather and Fur Workers Unions was formed in 1958 when the TUIs of Leather, Shoe, Fur and Leather Products and of Textile and Clothing Workers merged. Both of the earlier organizations were founded in 1949.

In 1997 the Trade Union International of Agroalimentary, Food, Commerce, Textile & Allied Industries was formed by the merger of the Trade Union International of Agricultural, Forestry and Plantation Workers, Trade Union International of Food, Tobacco, Hotel and Allied Industries Workers, Trade Union International of Workers in Commerce, Trade Union International of Textile, Leather and Fur Workers Unions.

== Organization ==
The TUI had a controlling congress, directing committee, bureau and permanent secretariat.

In 1978 its address was listed as Opletova 57 Prague, 1 an address it would keep until at least 1991.

It cooperated on a regional level with the Latin American Federation of Textile, Clothing and Leather Workers, the Arab Federation of Textile Workers and the Organization of African Trade Union Unity.

== Membership ==
In 1976 the TUI claimed affiliates in 29 countries. In 1985 it had 75 organizations in 58 countries representing 29 million members.

== Publications ==
It published the periodicals Courier and News.

== Leadership ==
=== General Secretaries ===
1958: Jaroslav Mevald
Zdeněk Špička
1979: Jan Kriz
1987: Jan Hübner
1990: Evgeni Sidorov

=== Presidents ===
1958: Teresa Noce
c.1960: Lina Fibbi
Antonio Molinari
Gilberto Morales

== See also ==
- International Textile, Garment and Leather Workers' Federation
