= General Commission of German Trade Unions =

- Generalkommission der Gewerkschaften Deutschlands
- Merged into: General German Trade Union Federation
- Founded: 16 November 1890
- Dissolved: 5 July 1919
- Headquarters: Engelufer 62–64, Berlin
- Location: Germany
- Key people: Carl Legien (President)
- Publication: Correspondenzblatt der Generalkommission
- Affiliations: ISNTUC

The General Commission of German Trade Unions (German: Generalkommission der Gewerkschaften Deutschlands) was an umbrella body for German trade unions during the German Empire, from the end of the Anti-Socialist Laws in 1890 up to 1919. In 1919, a successor organisation was named the Allgemeiner Deutscher Gewerkschaftsbund, and then in 1949, the current Deutscher Gewerkschaftsbund was formed.

== History ==
In January 1890, the Reichstag refused to extend the Anti-Socialist Laws which had prohibited socialist political parties and trade unions. Despite this, many of those trade unions which did exist, the Free Trade Unions, had come to work closely with the Social Democratic Party of Germany (SPD).

Large celebrations marked May Day in 1890. In Hamburg, employers locked out workers who took the day off. In response, the various unions representing metal and engineering workers called for a union conference, to look at the implications of this defeat. On 16 and 17 November, trade union leaders met in Berlin, and agreed to found the General Commission of German Trade Unions, under the leadership of Carl Legien.

The new organisation brought together unions representing a total of 290,000 members. It initially focused on activities which affiliates were unable or unwilling to undertake. On 1 January 1891, it launched a journal, Correspondenzblatt der Generalkommission, to promote membership recruitment and support. Initially, the new organisation struggled, and affiliated membership fell from 215,000 in 1892.

In March 1892, the commission called a congress in Halberstadt, at which a majority agreed to support the formation of national, centralised unions. While this approach was favoured by the existing central unions, and by smaller, craft unions, it was strongly opposed by local unions. These tended to be associated with the left wing of the SPD, and argued unsuccessfully for the unions to play a major political role.

The commission promoted some standardisation among its members, encouraging them to set up insurance funds to cover strikes, travel, health, and death. It argued that unions must actively recruit women as members, although the process proved slow. It also argued for increases in membership fees, to strengthen the unions, and this led unions to take on more employees - numbers rising from 269 in 1900, to 2,867 in 1914. While it remained neutral on whether craft unions should merge to form industrial unions, there was a strong tendency towards mergers, with the number of affiliates falling from 70 in 1890, to 46 in 1914, even as overall affiliated membership increased rapidly. By 1904, affiliated membership had reached 1,100,000, and in 1914, it hit 2,500,000.

By the second half of the 1890s, Legien was arguing that the unions were no longer a recruitment school for the SPD, but were mass industrial organisations, of whom only a minority of members would become political activists. In 1905, the commission voted against the use of general strikes for political end, against the opposition of the SPD. While the party leadership sought to smooth over the difference in opinion, Rosa Luxemburg vocally opposed the lack of political activity among the trade unions, and even Karl Kautsky argued that there were limits to what trade unions could achieve without undertaking political activity. The commission maintained its position, writing "Contributions to the Appreciation of the Work of the German Trade Unions" in response.

The commission supported German involvement in World War I, arguing for a moratorium on political debate and industrial action. As the war continued, popular support for it fell, along with union membership. When the Independent Social Democratic Party split away from the SPD, in opposition to war loans, the commission remained loyal to the SPD, but began calling more clearly for political and social reforms. In December 1918, with the SPD in power, the commission participated in founding the Central Working Group for Industrial and Commercial Employers and Employees in Germany. The unions were legally recognised as the representatives of the workers, but were compelled to negotiate with employers through formal structures.

In November 1919, the commission held its tenth congress, and voted to reform as the General German Trade Union Federation.

== Affiliates ==
The following unions were affiliated from 1904 onwards:

Union	Short name	Founded	Left	Reason	Membership (1904)	Membership (1913)
Central Union of Asphalters and Roof Felters of Germany	Asphalteure	1904	1919	Transferred to ADGB	N/A	
Central Union of Bakers and Confectioners	Bäcker und Konditoren	1907	1919	Transferred to ADGB	N/A	28,978
Central Union of Brewery Workers	Brauereiarbeiter	1884	1910	Merged into Brewery & Mill Workers	18,485	N/A
Central Union of Butchers	Fleischer	1893	1919	Transferred to ADGB	2,435	
Central Union of Carpenters and Kindred Trades of Germany	Zimmerer	1883	1919	Transferred to ADGB	35,891	62,069
Central Union of Carvers of Germany	Bildhauer	1881	1919	Merged into Wood Workers	4,590	
Central Union of Civilian Musicians in Germany	Zivil-Musiker	1902	1919	Merged into Musicians	726	
Central Union of Commercial Employees	Handangestellten	1897	1919	Transferred to ADGB	3,398	23,967
Central Union of Confectionery and Gingerbread	Konditoren	1891	1907	Merged into Bakers & Confectioners	2,019	N/A
Central Union of Construction Workers	Bauhilfsarbeiter	1891	1910	Merged into Construction Workers	33,245	N/A
Central Union of Glassworkers	Glasarbeiter	1890	1919	Transferred to ADGB	5,881	
Central Union of Glaziers and Related Professionals	Glaser	1885	1919	Transferred to ADGB	3,666	
Central Union of Machinists and Stokers	Maschinisten und Heizer	1892	1919	Transferred to ADGB	8,090	26,406
Central Union of Masons	Maurer	1891	1910	Merged into Construction Workers	128,850	N/A
Central Union of Plasterers	Stukkateur	1892	1912	Merged into Construction Workers	5,575	N/A
Central Union of Potters	Töpfer	1892	1919	Transferred to ADGB	10,241	10,882
Central Union of Roofers	Dachdecker	1889	1919	Transferred to ADGB	3,573	
Central Union of Sailors of Germany	Seeleute	1898	1910	Merged into Transport Workers	3,189	N/A
Central Union of Ship Builders of Germany	Schiffszimmerer	1890	1919	Transferred to ADGB	2,495	
Central Union of Shoemakers of Germany	Schuhmacher	1883	1919	Transferred to ADGB	25,262	44,902
Central Union of Stonemasons of Germany	Steinarbeiter	1884	1919	Transferred to ADGB	10,012	31,061
Factory Workers' Union of Germany	Fabrikarbeiter	1890	1919	Transferred to ADGB	49,181	195,441
General German Gardeners' Union	Gärtner	1890	1919	Transferred to ADGB	3,144	
German Agricultural Workers' Union	Landarbeiter	1909	1919	Transferred to ADGB	N/A	17,000
German Choral Singers' Union	Chorsänger	1884	1919	Transferred to ADGB	N/A	
German Construction Workers' Union	Bauarbeiter	1911	1919	Transferred to ADGB	N/A	326,631
German Furriers' Union	Kürschner	1902	1919	Transferred to ADGB	1,935	
German Hat Workers' Union	Hutmacher	1871	1919	Transferred to ADGB	4,269	11,562
German Leather Workers' Union	Lederarbeiter	1872	1919	Transferred to ADGB	5,473	16,231
German Metal Workers' Union	Metallarbeiter	1891	1919	Transferred to ADGB	176,221	556,139
German Mill Workers' Union	Mühlenarbeiter	1889	1910	Merged into Brewery & Mill Workers	3,456	N/A
German Musicians' Union	Musiker	1919	1919	Transferred to ADGB	N/A	N/A
German Painters' Union	Maler	1885	1919	Transferred to ADGB	22,859	47,511
German Railway Union	Eisenbahner	1916	1919	Transferred to ADGB	N/A	N/A
German Railway Workers' Union	Eisenbahner	1897	1908	Merged into Transport Workers	N/A	N/A
German Shipyard Workers' Union	Werftarbeiter	1896			3,730	
German Textile Workers' Union	Textilarbeiter	1891	1919	Transferred to ADGB	53,568	141,484
German Tobacco Workers' Union	Tabakarbeiter	1872	1919	Transferred to ADGB	19,456	34,191
German Transport Workers' Union	Transportarbeiter	1897	1919	Transferred to ADGB	36,325	229,785
German Umbrella Makers' Union	Schirmmacher	1904	1910	Merged into Wood Workers	N/A	N/A
German Wood Workers' Union	Holzarbeiter	1893	1919	Transferred to ADGB	97,105	195,441
German Xylographers' Union	Xylographen	1874	1919	Transferred to ADGB	434	
Music Engravers' Assistants' Union	Notenstecher	1872	1919	Transferred to ADGB	326	
Union of Alsace-Lorraine Book Printers	Buckdrucker (Elsaß-Lothringischen)	1882			854	
Union of Bakers and Related Workers of Germany	Bäcker	1885	1907	Merged into Bakers & Confectioners	9,068	N/A
Union of Blacksmiths	Schmeide	1885	1912	Merged into Metal Workers	12,185	N/A
Union of Book and Stone Printing Assistants of Germany	Buch- und Steinbruderei-Hilfsarbeiter	1898	1919	Transferred to ADGB	4,082	15,731
Union of Bookbinders and Paper Workers of Germany	Buchbinder	1885	1919	Transferred to ADGB	15,206	33,337
Union of Brewery and Mill Workers	Brauerei- und Mühlenarbeiter	1910	1919	Transferred to ADGB	N/A	51,537
Union of Cigar Sorters and Box Gluers of Germany	Zigarrensortierer	1885	1912	Merged into Tobacco Workers	1,471	N/A
Union of Coopers, Cellar Managers, and Helpers in Germany	Böttcher	1885	1919	Transferred to ADGB	6,200	
Union of Coppersmiths of Germany	Kupferschmide	1886	1919	Transferred to ADGB	3,341	
Union of Upholsterers of Germany	Tapezierer	1897	1919	Transferred to ADGB	5,377	10,534
Union of Dockers of Germany	Hafenarbeiter	1891	1910	Merged into Transport Workers	14,054	N/A
Union of Domestic Workers of Germany	Hausangestellten	1909	1919	Transferred to ADGB	N/A	
Union of Engravers and Chiselers	Graveure und Ciseleure	1897	1907	Merged into Metal Workers	2,265	N/A
Union of Flower, Feather and Leaf Workers	Blumenarbeiter	1903	1913	Merged into Factory Workers	353	N/A
Union of German Book Printers	Buchdrucker	1866	1919	Transferred to ADGB	38,976	68,682
Union of German Restaurant Workers	Gastwirtsgehilfen	1897	1919	Transferred to ADGB	2,838	16,096
Union of Gilders	Vergolder	1890	1906	Merged into Wood Workers	1,710	N/A
Union of Glove Makers of Germany	Handschuhmacher	1869	1909	Merged into Leather Workers	2,988	N/A
Union of Hairdressers and Assistants	Friseurgehilfen	1889	1919	Transferred to ADGB	868	2,500
Union of Insulation and Screed Layers of Germany	Isolierer	1906	1911	Merged into Construction Workers	N/A	N/A
Union of Laundry and Tie Workers	Wäschearbeiter	1903	1907	Merged into Garment Workers	875	N/A
Union of Lithographers and Lithographic Printers	Lithographen und Steindrucker	1891	1919	Transferred to ADGB	10,658	16,688
Union of Miners of Germany	Bergarbeiter	1889	1919	Transferred to ADGB	75,364	104,113
Union of Municipal and State Workers	Gemeindebetriebearbeiter	1896	1919	Transferred to ADGB	12,156	52,996
Union of Office Employees of Germany	Bureauangestellte	1897	1919	Transferred to ADGB	536	8,953
Union of Porcelain and Related Workers of Germany	Porzellanarbeiter	1892	1919	Transferred to ADGB	8,054	16,592
Union of Portfolio Makers	Portfeuiller	1901	1909	Merged into Saddlers & Portfolio Makers	2,502	N/A
Union of Saddlers	Sattler	1889	1909	Merged into Saddlers & Portfolio Makers	4,259	N/A
Union of Saddlers and Portfolio Makers	Sattler und Portfeuiller	1909	1919	Transferred to ADGB	N/A	14,908
Union of Stone Setters, Pavers and Kindred Trades	Steinsetzer	1886	1919	Transferred to ADGB	5,933	11,395
Union of Tailors and Dressmakers in Germany	Schneider	1888	1919	Transferred to ADGB	23,242	49,978
Union of Warehouse Workers	Lagerhalter	1895	1913	Merged into Commercial Assistants	1,267	N/A
Photographic Assistants	Photographengehilfen	1899	1908	Merged into Lithographers	N/A	

== See also ==
- German labour law
