= Free Trade Unions =

Free Trade Unions may refer to:

- Free Trade Unions of the Coast, a Polish labor union
- Free Trade Unions (Germany), a German labor organization
- Free Trade Union, a British organization
- Free Trade Unions (Bulgaria), a Bulgarian labor organization
- Free Trade Unions (Poland), a German trade unions in Poland, based in the former Prussian territories that were ceded to Poland
- Sindicatos Libres, a former Carlist trade union in Spain during the pistolerismo years.
