= Union of Lithographers and Lithographic Printers =

German trade union

- Union of Lithographers, Lithographic Printers and Kindred Trades
- Verband der Lithographen, Steindrucker und verwandten Berufe
- Successor: Industrial Union of Printing and Paper (E Germany), Printing and Paper Union (W Germany)
- Founded: 1 April 1891
- Dissolved: 2 May 1933
- Headquarters: Elsässer Straße 86/88, Berlin
- Location: Germany
- Members: 23,719 (1928)
- Publication: Graphische Press
- Affiliations: ADGB, LI

The Union of Lithographers, Lithographic Printers and Kindred Trades (German: Verband der Lithographen, Steindrucker und verwandten Berufe) was a trade union representing printers in Germany. It was sometimes referred to as the Senefelder Union, after Alois Senefelder, the inventor of lithography.

== History ==
Various local unions of lithographers were formed in Germany in the 1880s, and in 1888, they launched the Graphische Press as a joint journal. This led the unions to organise joint conferences in 1889 and 1890, the latter one agreeing to form a national union. This was established on 1 April 1891, and was initially based in Magdeburg, and led by Otto Sillier. On founding, it had 2,768 members, and this grew rapidly, reaching 11,497 by 1905. It affiliated to the General Commission of German Trade Unions.

In 1919, the union was a founding affiliate of the General German Trade Union Confederation. Within the federation, it was part of the Graphic Block. For many years, the union also hosted the headquarters of the International Federation of Lithographers, Lithographic Printers and Kindred Trades. The Music Printers' Assistants' Union merged in July 1920, followed by the German Xylographers' Union on 1 January 1921.

The union represented workers in various printing processes. The most important was lithography, in which a distinction was made between the lithographers who drew an image to be printed, and lithographic printers, who did the actual printing. By the start of 1932, the union had 20,691 members, divided between the following trades:

Trade	Members
Art photography printing	115
Collotyping	476
Copperplate printing	92
Intaglio	577
Lithography	3,474
Music engraving	301
Portrait photography	135
Related trades	116
Lithographic printing	9,984
Woodblock printing	446
Xylography	118
Zincography	4,857

The union was banned by the Nazi government in 1933. After World War II, printers were represented as part of the Printing and Paper Union.

== Presidents ==
1891: Otto Sillier
1919: Johannes Haß
