= Kähler =

Kähler may refer to:

== People ==
- Birgit Kähler (born 1970), German high jumper
- Erich Kähler (1906–2000), German mathematician
- Heinz Kähler (1905–1974), German art historian and archaeologist
- Luise Kähler (1869–1955), German trade union leader and politician
- Martin Kähler (1835–1912), German theologian
- Otto Kähler (1894–1967), German admiral
- Wilhelmine Kähler (1864–1941), German politician

== Other ==
- Kähler Keramik, a Danish ceramics manufacturer
- Kähler manifold, an important geometric complex manifold

== See also ==
- Kahler (disambiguation)
