= German Union of Building Trades =

- Deutscher Baugewerksbund
- Successor: Industrial Union of Construction (E Germany), Building and Construction Union (W Germany)
- Founded: 1 January 1923
- Dissolved: May 2, 1933
- Headquarters: 5-6 Friedrichstraße, Berlin
- Location: Germany
- Members: 435,156 (1924)
- Publication: Der Grundstein
- Affiliations: ADGB, IFBW

The German Union of Building Trades (German: Deutscher Baugewerksbund, DBB) was a trade union representing construction workers in Germany.

The union was founded on 1 January 1923, when the German Construction Workers' Union merged with the Central Union of Glaziers, and the Central Union of Potters. Like its predecessors, it affiliated to the General German Trade Union Confederation. In 1924, the Union of Asphalters joined, followed in 1931 by the Central Union of Roofers. In 1924, the union had 435,156 members, making it the third largest union in the country. It was organised in 18 districts.

In May 1933, the union was banned by the Nazis. After World War II, a new Building and Construction Union was formed.

== Presidents ==
1923: Fritz Paeplow
1927: Nikolaus Bernhard
