= Georg Wollmann =

German trade union leader

Georg Wollmann (born 1861) was a German trade union leader.

Wollmann became a ceramic worker and joined the Union of Porcelain and Related Workers of Germany. In 1893, he was elected as president of the union. From 1913, he additionally served as general secretary of the International Federation of Pottery Workers. In 1926, he merged the union into the Factory Workers' Union of Germany, and became a leading figure in its Ceramic Federation.

Trade union offices
Preceded by ?	President of the Union of Porcelain and Related Workers of Germany; 1893–1926	Succeeded by Union merged
Preceded by Fritz Zietsch	General Secretary of the International Federation of Pottery Workers; 1913–1933	Succeeded by Ernst Roll
