= Fritz Paeplow =

German trade unionist and politician

Friedrich Paeplow (17 May 1860 – 19 January 1934) was a German trade unionist and politician.

Born in Zirkow, in the Prussian Province of Pomerania, Paeplow completed an apprenticeship as a bricklayer, and moved to Chemnitz in his journeyman years. He joined the Social Democratic Party of Germany (SPD), and in 1890 was elected as its Chemnitz chair. In 1892, he became the editor of the local SPD newspaper, the Chemnitzer Beobachter, and also became a shop steward for the Central Union of Masons.

In 1896, Paeplow moved to Hamburg, where he became the editor of Grundstein, the masons' union's national newspaper. From 1899, he served on the executive of the General Commission of German Trade Unions, although he stood down in 1902, when the federation's headquarters moved to Berlin. He remained politically active, and in 1904 was elected to Hamburg City Council.

Paeplow was a delegate at the 1907 congress of the Second International, held in Stuttgart. There, he sided with American, Australian, and South African delegates during the discussion on immigration policy. Taking a hard-line nativist stance, Paeplow argued in favor of restricting immigration, especially from Asia, Italy, and the Slavic lands.

In 1908, Paeplow became the general secretary of the masons' union, and office manager for its president, Theodor Bömelburg. He remained in post when the union became part of the German Construction Workers' Union in 1911, and in 1913 succeeded Bömelburg as president. He also became general secretary of the International Federation of Building Workers (IFBW).

Paeplow supported German involvement in World War I, and argued against any industrial action while the conflict was ongoing. After the war, he argued for the socialisation of housing. In 1919, he switched to become president of the IFBW, and he was appointed to the Provisional Reich Economic Council. In 1923, he took the union into a further merger, which produced the German Union of Building Trades, of which he remained president.

In 1925, Paeplow was elected as an SPD member of the Reichstag, though he served only until 1926. In 1927, Paeplow retired from his trade union posts. He then wrote a history of the German construction workers, which was published in 1932.

Trade union offices
Preceded by Theodor Bömelburg	President of the German Construction Workers' Union; 1913–1922	Succeeded by Union merged
Preceded by Theodor Bömelburg	General Secretary of the International Federation of Building Workers; 1913–1919	Succeeded by Georg Käppler
Preceded by New position	President of the International Federation of Building Workers; 1919–1927	Succeeded by ?
Preceded by New position	President of the German Union of Building Trades; 1923–1927	Succeeded by Nikolaus Bernhard
