= Theodor Bömelburg =

German trade unionist and politician

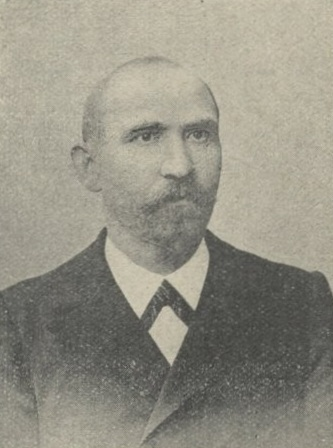
Theodor Bömelburg

Theodor Bömelburg (27 September 1862 – 17 October 1912) was a German trade unionist and politician.

Bömelburg was born in Westönnen, now part of Werl, in the Prussian Province of Westphalia. He completed an apprenticeship as a bricklayer and plasterer, and in 1886 he was a founder of the builders' union in Bochum. By 1888, he was living in Hamburg, where he became the chair of the local Social Democratic Party of Germany (SPD). The following year, he became an official of the city's local builders' union. In 1891, he led it into a merger with other local unions, forming the national Central Union of Masons.

Bömelburg was appointed to the executive of the masons' union in 1893, and in 1894 won election as its president. That year, he was also elected as president of the Hamburg Trades Council, serving for a single year-long term. He became prominent in the General Commission of German Trade Unions, co-chairing its conferences from 1899 until 1908. In 1903, he was elected to the Reichstag, representing Dortmund-Hörde. In 1904, he was elected to the Hamburg Parliament, part of the first group of SPD members to sit in the body.

In 1907, he led the formation of the International Federation of Building Workers, becoming its first general secretary. From late 1910, he became increasingly unwell, but he continued to work. In 1911, he led the masons' union into a merger, forming the German Construction Workers' Union, remaining its president. He died in 1912, still in office.

Trade union offices
Preceded by Adolf Dammann	President of the Central Union of Masons; 1894–1910	Succeeded by Union merged
Preceded by New position	General Secretary of the International Federation of Building Workers; 1907–1912	Succeeded by Fritz Paeplow
Preceded by New position	President of the German Construction Workers' Union; 1911–1912	Succeeded by Fritz Paeplow
