= Kahler =

Kahler may refer to:

== Places ==
- Kahler, Luxembourg, a small town in the commune of Garnich
- Kahler Asten, a German mountain range

== Other uses ==
- Kahler (surname)
- Kahler's disease, a cancer otherwise known as multiple myeloma
- Kahler Tremolo System, a type of bridge hardware for electric guitars
- Kahler v. Kansas, a 2019 United States Supreme Court case
- Kahler, a fictional alien species in the science fiction television series Doctor Who.

== See also ==
- Kähler (disambiguation)
