= International Federation of Bookbinders and Kindred Trades =

Global union federation (1907–1949)

The International Federation of Bookbinders and Kindred Trades was a global union federation representing unions of bookbinders.

== History ==
In 1902, the Austrian bookbinders' union suggested organising an international conference of bookbinders, and this took place in Germany in 1904. The conference agreed to build closer relationships between the unions in attendance, and the Union of Bookbinders and Paper Workers of Germany issued a questionnaire on what form these should take. The responses were inconclusive, but the Austrian union was keen on forming an international federation, and in 1907, the German union agreed to host a founding conference in Nuremberg.

The headquarters of the federation were established in Berlin, but in 1920 they moved to Bern. By 1925, the federation had 17 affiliates, with a total of 79,800 members, dropping to 42,072 in 1935. At this point, its largest affiliate was the British National Union of Printing, Bookbinding and Paper Workers, with other affiliates in Belgium, Czechoslovakia, Denmark, Hungary, Finland, France, Norway, the Netherlands, Sweden, Switzerland and Yugoslavia.

In 1939, the federation agreed to merge with the Lithographers' International and the International Typographers' Secretariat. However, due to World War II, no progress was made until 1946, when the British Printing and Kindred Trades Federation established a committee which drafted a constitution for a merged organisation. This was established in 1949, as the International Graphical Federation.

== Affiliates ==
In 1922, the following unions were affiliated:

Union	Country	Membership
Union of Bookbinders and Paperworkers in Austria	Austria	5,978
Central Union of Bookbinders	Belgium	2,898
	Czechoslovakia	3,656
Danish Bookbinders' and Stationers' Union	Denmark	3,009
French Federation of Book Workers	France	1,457
Union of Bookbinders and Paper Workers of Germany	Germany	98,810
	Hungary	3,949
	Italy	13,300
	Netherlands	4,097
Norwegian Union of Bookbinders and Cardboard Workers	Norway	1,528
Swedish Bookbinders' Union	Sweden	2,700
Swiss Bookbinders' Union	Switzerland	1,266
National Union of Printing, Bookbinding and Paper Workers	United Kingdom	24,000
Association of Graphic Workers of Yugoslavia	Yugoslavia	846

== Leadership ==
=== General Secretaries ===
1907: Emil Kloth
1920: Heinrich Hochstrasser
1936: Kristian Eriksen

=== Presidents ===
1920: Eugen Haueisen
1933: Corneel Mertens?
1935: Jos Van Staeyen
