= SOTP =

SOTP may refer to:

- Saturn Orbiter/Titan Probe, later officially named Cassini-Huygens
- Sex Offender Treatment Program, a program used to prevent recidivism in sex offenders
- "Scared of the Police", a song by the British rock band Reuben
- The Sisterhood of the Traveling Pants, a book series and later a film franchise
- State of the Province address, a speech given by a provincial commander-in-chief; similar to the State of the State address for a state's commander-in-chief
- Sum-of-the-parts analysis, a method of company valuation

== See also ==
- STP (disambiguation)
- SOP (disambiguation)
- SP (disambiguation)
