= Union of Porcelain and Related Workers of Germany =

Ceramic trade union in Germany

The Union of Porcelain and Related Workers of Germany (German: Verband der Porzellan- und verwandten Arbeiter und Arbeiterinnen Deutschlands) was a trade union representing workers in the ceramic industry in Germany.

The union was founded in 1892, and it affiliated to the General Commission of German Trade Unions. The following year, Georg Wollmann was elected as its president. The union journal, Die Ameise, was edited by Fritz Zietsch, who led the formation of the International Federation of Pottery Workers, the union hosting its headquarters until 1920.

In 1919, the union was a founding constituent of the General German Trade Union Confederation, and by 1920, it had 55,547 members. In 1926, it merged into the Factory Workers' Union of Germany.
