= Central Union of Hotel, Restaurant and Cafe Employees =

Former Weimar Republic trade union (1920–1933)

- Zentralverband der Hotel-, Restaurant- und Caféangestellten
- Predecessor: Union of German Restaurant Workers; Union of Hotel, Restaurant and Cafe Employees; Union of Chefs
- Successor: Industrial Union of Food, Luxuries and Hospitality (E Germany), Food, Beverages and Catering Union (W Germany)
- Founded: 1920; 106 years ago
- Dissolved: 2 May 1933; 92 years ago
- Headquarters: 86-88 Elsässer Straße, Berlin
- Location: Germany
- Members: 29,618 (1931)
- Publication: Gastwirtsgehilfen-Zeitung
- Affiliations: ADGB, IUHR

The Central Union of Hotel, Restaurant and Cafe Employees (German: Zentralverband der Hotel-, Restaurant- und Caféangestellten, ZVHRC) was a trade union representing hospitality workers in Germany.

The union was founded in 1920, when the Union of German Restaurant Workers merged with the Union of Hotel, Restaurant and Cafe Employees and the Union of Chefs. The union affiliated to the General German Trade Union Confederation, and internationally, to the International Union of Hotel, Restaurant and Bar Workers. By the end of 1931, the union had 29,618 members.

In 1933, the union was banned by the Nazis, but it continued to organise underground, especially in Frankfurt. It printed a newspaper and sent it to a limited number of members, but in 1936, the Gestapo acquired a list of recipients and closed the organisation down.

== Presidents ==
1920: Rudolf Ströhlinger
1930: Fritz Saar
