= Albert Baumeister =

German trade unionist and journalist

Albert Baumeister (1 June 1882 – 1953) was a German trade unionist and journalist.

Born in Erp, Baumeister worked as a waiter. He joined the Union of German Restaurant Workers, and in 1900 also joined the Social Democratic Party of Germany (SPD). From 1902, he worked full-time for the union, which in 1908 founded the International Union of Hotel, Restaurant and Bar Workers (IUHR). Baumeister was elected as the general secretary of the IUHR, serving until 1912, when he became secretary to Carl Legien.

During World War I, Baumeister was the editor of Feldpost and Internationale Korrespondenz, which championed the position of the right wing of the SPD. In 1917 and 1918, he was the head of the SPD's Niederbarnim constituency organisation, and after the Armistice, he became the city's People's Commissioner. During the German Revolution of 1918–1919, he was one of the organisers of the Reichstag regiment which fought for the SPD against the communist uprising.

From 1919, he worked at the International Labour Organization (ILO) in Geneva, then he moved to Berlin in 1922 to work at the ILO office there, editing the Internationale Rundschau der Arbeit. He left the SPD, and became the editor of Der deutsche Arbeiter, the journal of a group around Nickisch and Winning.

Trade union offices
| Preceded by New position | General Secretary of the International Union of Hotel, Restaurant and Bar Workers; 1908–1912 | Succeeded by Hugo Poetzsch |
