= Paula Thiede =

German trade unionist (1870–1919)

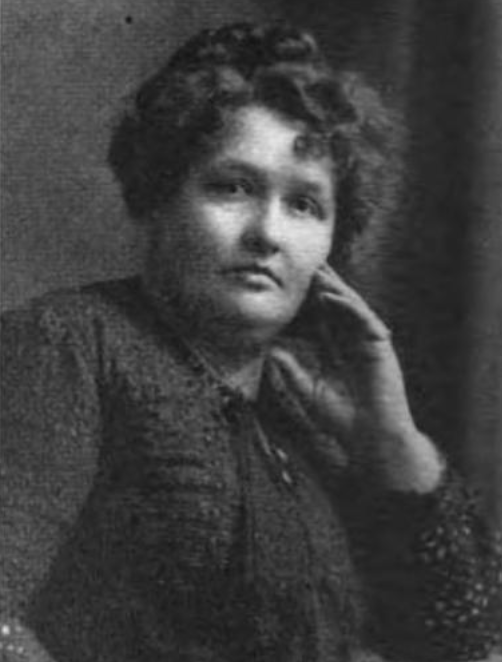
Thiede in 1914

Pauline Philippine Thiede (6 January 1870 – 3 March 1919) was a German trade unionist. She was the first woman to hold a full-time post as a trade union leader in Germany.

Born in Berlin as Paula Auguste, she began working in a print works when she was 14. She married and had two children, but her husband died shortly before her second child was born. Unable to work, and with no other income, she temporarily moved away and lived in accommodation which had not been completed, the damp conditions leading to the death of her baby.

Thiede was a founder of the Union of Workers in High Speed Book and Printing Presses in 1890, and in 1891 found work again on the printing presses. She soon took part in the major strike of book printers for a maximum nine-hour working day. The strike was defeated, and her union collapsed. Thiede instead joined a union of women assistant print workers in Berlin, and became its president in 1894. In 1896, they joined a strike led by the Union of German Book Printers, and secured a nine hour day.

In 1898, Thiede merged her union with a men's union, to form the Union of Auxiliary Book Printing Workers of Germany. She became president of the union, and editor of its newspaper, Solidarität. Under her leadership, the union negotiated a collective agreement on pay and working conditions in 1906, but it constantly struggled with finances. While some of the men in the union initially objected to being led by a woman, her successes soon led her to be accepted.

Thiede attended the International Socialist Women's Conferences in Stuttgart in 1907, and Copenhagen in 1910. At the latter conference, she worked with Clara Zetkin to successfully propose the creation of International Women's Day.

Thiede became seriously ill in 1917, and died in 1919. Shortly before her death, she was able to vote in the 1919 German federal election, the first time women were able to vote in the country.

Trade union offices
Preceded by New position	President of the Union of Auxiliary Book Printing Workers of Germany; 1898–1901	Succeeded by Karl Wittig
Preceded by Karl Wittig	President of the Union of Auxiliary Book Printing Workers of Germany; 1902–1919	Succeeded by Engelbert Pucher
