= Union of Graphic Assistants of Germany =

- Verband der Graphischen Hilfsarbeiter und Arbeiterinnen Deutschlands
- Successor: Industrial Union of Printing and Paper (E Germany), Printing and Paper Union (W Germany)
- Founded: June 1898
- Dissolved: 2 May 1933
- Headquarters: Elbinger Straße 18, Berlin
- Location: Germany
- Members: 40,691 (1928)
- Key people: Paula Thiede (President)
- Publication: Solidarität
- Affiliations: ADGB

The Union of Graphic Assistants of Germany (German: Verband der Graphischen Hilfsarbeiter und Arbeiterinnen Deutschlands, VGHA) was a trade union representing assistants in the printing trade in Germany.

The union was founded in 1898 as the Union of Auxiliary Book Printing Workers of Germany, bringing together the Union of Workers in High Speed Book and Printing Presses, a women's union led by Paula Thiede, and a men's union. The union affiliated to the General Commission of German Trade Unions. On formation, it had only 1,279 members, but by 1914, this had grown to 15,759 members, of whom, 8,438 were women. It was based in Berlin, and published the Solidarität journal. In 1905, it renamed itself as the Union of Book and Stone Printing Assistants of Germany.

In 1919, the union was a founding affiliate of the General German Trade Union Federation, within which it formed part of the Graphic Block. In 1920, it renamed itself as the "Union of Graphic Assistants of Germany". By this point, it was led by Engelbert Pucher. It continued to grow, and in 1928, it had 40,691 members.

It was banned by the Nazi government in 1933, and after World War II, graphic assistants were represented by the Printing and Paper Union.

== Presidents ==
1898: Paula Thiede
1901: Karl Wittig
1902: Paula Thiede
1919: Engelbert Pucher
