= International Secretariat of Potters =

The International Secretariat of Potters (German: Internationales Sekretariat der Töpfer) was a global union federation bringing together trade unions representing workers making tiles and related items for the construction industry.

The federation was established in 1907, on the initiative of Adam Drunsel, of the German Central Union of Potters. It dissolved in 1922, its members instead joining the International Federation of Building Workers.

== Affiliates ==
As of 1921, the federation's members were:

Union	Country	Membership
Central Union of Potters	Germany	11,200
Professional Association of Offsetters	Denmark	100
Swedish Tile Makers' Union	Sweden	800
Swiss Construction Workers' Union	Switzerland	500
Union of Ceramic Workers in Austria	Austria	800
