= Rudolf Ströhlinger =

Rudolf Ströhlinger (6 October 1865 – 7 August 1945) was an Austrian trade unionist, active in Germany.

Born in Vienna, Ströhlinger trained as a waiter, and in 1883 moved to work in the industry in Berlin. In 1890, he joined the Social Democratic Party of Germany (SPD), and was a founder member of an organisation of hospitality workers in Berlin. In 1898, this became part of the Union of German Restaurant Workers, Ströhlinger becoming its full-time treasurer. In 1920, the union became part of the Central Union of Hotel, Restaurant and Cafe Employees (ZVHCR), Ströhlinger becoming its president. He was also appointed to the Provisional Reich Economic Committee. In 1924, he also became the general secretary of the International Union of Hotel, Restaurant and Bar Workers (IUHR).

Ströhlinger retired as leader of the ZVHCR in 1930, but he remained the leader of the IUHR until the Nazi government banned German unions in 1933. In October, he was arrested and spent two weeks in the Oranienburg concentration camp. In 1935, his naturalisation as a German citizen was revoked, although he successfully fought attempts to expel him from the country. He survived World War II, dying in August 1945.

Trade union offices
Preceded by New position	President of the Central Union of Hotel, Restaurant and Cafe Employees; 1920–1930	Succeeded by Fritz Saar
Preceded by I. G. van Heusden	General Secretary of the International Union of Hotel, Restaurant and Bar Workers; 1924–1933	Succeeded by P. F. Loncke
