= Emil Girbig =

German trade unionist and politician

Emil Girbig (11 June 1866 – 6 February 1933) was a German trade unionist and politician.

Born in Elisabethhütte near Jamlitz, he completed an apprenticeship as a glassmaker. He joined the Central Union of Glass Workers, and in 1897 was elected as a president. The position was poorly paid, so he began running an inn in his spare time. However, the union grew under his leadership, and from 1900, it was able to employ him on a full-time wage. He was a founder of the International Federation of Glassworkers in 1908, and became its first general secretary, serving until 1920, when he became its president.

Girbig also joined the Social Democratic Party of Germany (SPD), and in 1919 he was elected to the Weimar National Assembly. He then held the same seat in the Reichstag of the Weimar Republic from 1920 to 1924, and from 1928 to 1930.

In 1926, Girbig arranged for the Glassworkers to merge into the Factory Workers' Union of Germany, within which he became the leader of the glassworkers within its new Ceramic Federation, until he retired in 1931.

Trade union offices
Preceded by ?	President of the Central Union of Glassworkers; 1897–1926	Succeeded by Union merged
Preceded by New position	General Secretary of the International Federation of Glassworkers; 1908–1920	Succeeded by Charles Delzant
