= Central Union of Construction Workers =

Former German Empire trade union (1891–1910)

- Zentralverband der Bauhilfsarbeiter
- Merged into: German Construction Workers' Union
- Founded: 6 April 1891
- Dissolved: 1 January 1911
- Location: Germany
- Members: 65,572 (1910)
- Publication: Der Bauarbeiter
- Affiliations: GGD, IFBW

The Central Union of Construction Workers (German: Zentralverband der Bauhilfsarbeiter) was a trade union representing building labourers in Germany.

The first national congress of local unions of building labourers was held in May 1889, and it agreed to launch a national journal, Der Bauarbeiter. With the repeal of the Anti-Socialist Laws, it was possible to form legal trade unions, and at the 3rd Congress of Construction Workers, in Halle, on 6 April 1891, the Central Union of Masons was established. It adopted Der Bauarbeiter as its journal.

The union initially had 2,500 members. It affiliated to the General Commission of German Trade Unions, and by 1904, its membership had grown to 33,245. By 1910, this had risen further, to 65,572. At the start of 1911, it merged with the Central Union of Masons, to form the German Construction Workers' Union.

== Presidents ==
1891: F. Krens
1901: Gustav Behrendt
