= Union of Domestic Workers of Germany =

The Union of Domestic Workers of Germany (German: Verband der Hausangestellten Deutschlands) was a trade union representing domestic staff in Germany.

The union was founded in 1909 and was based in Berlin. It published the newspaper Zentralorgan der Verband der Hausangestellten Deutschlands and affiliated to the General Commission of German Trade Unions. In 1919, the union was a founding affiliate of the General German Trade Union Federation. By 1920, it had 20,014 members, but this then fell, and hyperinflation put the union in financial difficulties. In 1923, it merged into the German Transport Workers' Union.

== Presidents ==
1909: Ida Baar
1913: Wilhelmine Kähler (acting)
1913: Luise Kähler
