= International Federation of Enginemen and Firemen =

The International Federation of Enginemen and Firemen (German: Internationale Bund der Maschinisten und Heizer, IBMH) was a global union federation bringing together unions representing workers involved in operating heavy machinery.

The federation was founded in 1927, on the initiative of the German Central Union of Machinists and Stokers. The two shared a leader, Hermann Klebe. It applied to affiliate to the International Federation of Trade Unions (IFTU), but was rejected, due to objections from the International Metalworkers' Federation. The two organisations reached an agreement in 1929, and the federation affiliated to the IFTU in 1930.

In 1933, the German trade union movement was banned, and membership of the federation fell from about 75,000 to only 20,165. The Austrian affiliate was banned in 1934, and the Polish affiliate was unable to pay its affiliation fee, leaving the federation with only three affiliates. Despite this, it held a congress in London in 1937, but ceased to operate around the start of World War II.
