= German Leather Workers' Union =

Former German Reich trade union (1872–1933)

- Deutscher Lederarbeiter-Verband
- Successor: Industrial Union of Leather (E Germany), Leather Union (W Germany)
- Founded: 1872
- Dissolved: May 2, 1933
- Headquarters: Altenberg
- Location: Germany
- Affiliations: ADGB, International Union of Leather Workers

The German Leather Workers' Union (German: Deutscher Lederarbeiter-Verband) was a trade union representing workers involved in tanning and glovemaking.

The union was founded in 1872 as the North German Union of White Tanners, based in Berlin, and by the end of 1873, it had 630 members. In 1876 it became the General German White Tanners' Union, and in 1877, it relocated its headquarters to Altenberg. In 1892, the union became the Union of Leather Workers of Germany, hoping to recruit other workers in the trade, and the following year, the Central Union of Tanners and Leather Dressers merged in. Its journal, Der Gerber, became the journal of the merged union, changing its name in 1896 to the Lederarbeiter-Zeitung. This began a period of growth for the union, which by the end of 1896 had 4,222 members.

In 1909, the Union of Glove Makers of Germany merged into the union. The union provided the leadership of the International Federation of Glovemakers, which the Leather Workers took over, in 1914 transforming it into the International Union of Leather Workers. In 1919, the union was a founding affiliate of the General German Trade Union Confederation.

Membership of the union continued to grow, reaching 11,922 in 1909, and peaking at 48,139 in 1923. Membership fell during the Great Depression, and was 37,855 by 1928. In 1933, the union was banned by the Nazi government. After World War II, tanners and glovemakers were represented by the Leather Union.

== Presidents ==
1872: Karl Reuter
1886: Beisswenger or Beiswenger
1902: Heinrich Mahler
