= International Union of Hatters =

Trade association

The International Union of Hatters was a global union federation of trade unions representing people involved in making hats.

== History ==
The various unions of hatters across Europe had long collaborated on support for workers moving between countries, and in 1878 representatives of the unions in Denmark, Germany and Italy all met at an exhibition in Paris to discuss the possibility of forming an international organisation. No such federation was created, but further meetings were held in Paris in 1889, Zurich in 1893, and London in 1896.

The International Federation of Hatters was established in 1900, initially based in Paris. Its headquarters moved to Altenburg in 1906, Monza in 1921, and back to Paris in the early 1930s.

One of the smaller global union federations, by 1925, it had 13 affiliates with a total of 57,077 members. By 1936, it had affiliates in Belgium, Czechoslovakia, Denmark, France, Sweden, Switzerland and the United Kingdom. It appears to have dissolved at the start of World War II. After the war, the hatters' unions were admitted to the International Shoe and Leather Workers' Federation.

== Affiliates ==
The following unions were affiliated as of 1922:

Union	Country	Affiliated membership
Union of Hat Workers of Austria	Austria	5,167
	Brazil	?
	Bulgaria	?
	Czechoslovakia	2,134
Danish Hatters' and Furriers' Union	Denmark	1,309
Hatters' Federation	France	4,200
German Hat Workers' Union	Germany	29,143
	Hungary	390
Italian Federation of Hat Workers	Italy	8,470
	Norway	9
	Poland	1,126
Swedish Hat and Fur Workers' Union	Sweden	449
Swiss Hat and Cap Makers' Union	Switzerland	152
Felt Hatters' and Trimmers' Unions of Great Britain	United Kingdom	3,900
	Yugoslavia	120

== General Secretaries ==
1900: Joseph Espanet
1906: Alfred Metzschke
1921: Ettore Reina
1929: Position abolished
