= German Railway Union =

Former German Reich trade union (1916–1925)

The German Railway Union (German: Deutsche Eisenbahner-Verband, DEV) was a trade union representing railway workers in Germany.

The union was established in 1916, when the railway section of the German Transport Workers' Union merged with the Union for Bavarian Railway Workshops and Operational Workers, and some other small unions representing railway workers in southern Germany. The union affiliated to the General Commission of German Trade Unions, and it grew rapidly, its membership being 345,000 by 1919.

In 1919, the union was a founding affiliate of the General German Trade Union Federation. By 1925, membership had fallen to 197,000. That year, the union merged with the small National Union of German Railway Officials and Trainees, to form the United Union of German Railway Workers.

== Presidents ==
1916: Louis Brunner
1921: Franz Scheffel
