= Hermann Klebe =

German trade unionist

Hermann Klebe (born 16 August 1878) was a German trade unionist.

Klebe became a naval engineer, and joined the Central Union of Machinists and Stokers. In 1919, he became the president of the union. In 1927, he led the formation of the International Federation of Enginemen and Firemen, becoming its general secretary. He lost all his trade union posts in 1933, when the German unions were banned by the Nazi government. He fled to Denmark, where he continued involvement in trade unionism.

Trade union offices
| Preceded by Franz Scheffel | President of the Central Union of Machinists and Stokers; 1919–1933 | Succeeded by Union banned |
| Preceded by New position | General Secretary of the International Federation of Enginemen and Firemen; 1927–1933 | Succeeded by ? |
