= Werner Peplowski =

German trade union leader

- Born: January 4, 1944 (age 82); Dresden, Germany
- Education: University of Potsdam
- Alma mater: Party University of the CPSU
- Occupation: Trade union leader
- Known for: President of the Industrial Union of Printing and Paper
- Political party: Socialist Unity Party of Germany (SED)

Werner Peplowski (born 4 January 1944) is a former German trade union leader.

Born in Dresden, Peplowski completed an apprenticeship as a toolmaker, then studied biology and agriculture at the University of Potsdam; while there, he served as leader of the Free German Youth at the university, then completed a PhD in 1972. He joined the Socialist Unity Party of Germany (SED) in 1964, and from 1972 he was the secretary of the SED on the university campus, working as a lecturer.

Peplowski undertook further study at the Party University of the CPSU in the Soviet Union, before returning to Potsdam. From 1980, he was Secretary for Science, Popular Education and Culture in the Potsdam City district. In 1984, he became Secretary of Labor and Law in the Union of Education and Training.

In 1985, Peplowski was appointed president of the Industrial Union of Printing and Paper (IG DuP), also serving as the executive of the Free German Trade Union Federation (FDGB). The following year, he additionally became president of the Standing Committee of Trade Unions in the Graphic Industry.

In 1989, Peplowski wrote to Harry Tisch, leader of the FDGB, proposing that Tisch resign. He did so, and Peplowski was given charge of arranging a special congress of the FDGB at the end of the year. He stood for the vacant presidency of the FDGB, but was defeated by Helga Mausch. Instead, he remained with the IG DuP, arranging for its dissolution and transferring its members to other unions, mostly the Media Union.

Trade union offices
| Preceded by Heinz Deckert | President of the Industrial Union of Printing and Paper; 1985–1990 | Succeeded by Union dissolved |
| Preceded by Heinz Deckert | President of the Standing Committee of Trade Unions in the Graphic Industry; 1986–1990 | Succeeded by Federation dissolved |
