= Henri Berckmans =

Former Belgian trade union leader

Henri Berckmans (died 1950) was a Belgian trade union leader.

Berckmans became a wood engraver, and by the 1910s, he was the secretary of the Union of Wood Engravers of Brussels. In 1913, he merged the union into the new Central Union of Workers in Lithography and Kindred Trades. The union's leader, François Poels, was seconded to government work during World War I, so Berckmans became acting general secretary. He took the position permanently in 1919, also becoming editor of the union's journal, De Arbeider der Graphische Kunsten.

In 1924, Berckmans took the union into a merger which formed the Union of Bookworkers of Belgium, becoming its general secretary, and editing its journal, De Boekbewerker. In 1926, Poels died, and Berckmans was soon elected to succeed him as secretary of the International Federation of Lithographers, Lithographic Printers and Kindred Trades. However, he was not successful in this role, and agreed to stand down in 1929.

Berckmans retired from his trade union post in 1935, and found work at the Cartographic Institute.

Trade union offices
Preceded by François Poels	General Secretary of the Central Union of Workers in Lithography and Kindred Trades; 1919–1923	Succeeded by Union merged
Preceded by New position	General Secretary of the Union of Bookworkers of Belgium; 1924–1935	Succeeded by Victor Gooris?
Preceded by François Poels	General Secretary of the International Federation of Lithographers, Lithographic Printers and Kindred Trades; 1927–1929	Succeeded by Jacob Roelofs
