= Fritz Zietsch =

German politician and trade unionist

Fritz Zietsch (23 April 1877 – 6 July 1913) was a German politician and trade unionist.

Born in Berlin, Zietsch became a porcelain painter, and joined the Union of Porcelain and Related Workers of Germany. He also joined the Social Democratic Party of Germany (SPD), and in 1900 became the editor of a party newspaper. In 1902, he was elected to the state parliament of Saxony-Meiningen, representing Saalfeld.

In 1903, he moved to become editor of Die Ameise, the porcelain workers' journal. Two years later, he wrote to unions of pottery workers around Europe, proposing the formation of an international federation. The International Federation of Pottery Workers was established later in the year, and Zietsch was elected as its first general secretary.

Zietsch also continued his political activity. In 1909, he was elected to the Reichstag, and also to the Charlottenburg City Council. He died in 1913.

Trade union offices
Preceded by New position	General Secretary of the International Federation of Pottery Workers; 1905–1913	Succeeded by Georg Wollmann
Media offices
Preceded by Rudi Jahn	Editor of Die Ameise; 1903–1913	Succeeded by Karl Eberhardt
