= Central Union of Machinists and Stokers =

Former German Reich trade union (1892–1933)

- Central Union of Machinists and Stokers and Kindred Trades of Germany
- Zentral-Verband der Maschinisten und Heizer sowie Berufsgenossen Deutschlands
- Successor: Industrial Union of Metal (E Germany), Industrial Union of Metal (W Germany)
- Founded: 1892
- Dissolved: 2 May 1933
- Headquarters: Skalitzer Straße 47–48, Berlin
- Location: Germany
- Members: 100,287 (1920)
- Publication: Zeitung der Deutschen Maschinisten und Heizer
- Affiliations: ADGB, IBMH

The Central Union of Machinists and Stokers and Kindred Trades of Germany (German: Zentral-Verband der Maschinisten und Heizer sowie Berufsgenossen Deutschlands, ZMH) was a trade union representing machine operators and those in related areas of work, in Germany.

The union was founded in Berlin in 1892, with the merger of various local unions, and affiliated to the General Commission of German Trade Unions. It represented machinists, stokers, and those in related areas of work, regardless of the industry in which they were employed. In 1919, the union was a founding constituent of the General German Trade Union Confederation, and by 1920, it had 100,287 members. In 1927, the union established the International Federation of Enginemen and Firemen.

By 1928, the union's membership had declined to 48,568. In 1933, the union was banned by the Nazi government.

== Presidents ==
1906: Franz Scheffel
1918: Hermann Klebe
