= François Poels =

Belgian trade union leader

François Poels (12 April 1881 – 27 December 1926) was a Belgian trade union leader.

Born in Elsene, Poels completed an apprenticeship as a lithographer. In 1906, he joined the Union of Lithographers in Brussels, becoming its deputy general secretary in 1911, and general secretary in 1912. He argued in favour of a single union covering the whole printing trade, and as a step towards this, in 1913, he merged his union into the new Union of Workers in Lithography and Kindred Trades, becoming its first general secretary.

Poels served on the Committee d'Appel du Secours de Chomage during World War I then, after the war, left his trade union post to become secretary of the Brussels Labour Exchange. However, he remained involved with his old union, and in 1920, he was elected as general secretary of the International Federation of Lithographers, Lithographic Printers and Kindred Trades.

Poels also became secretary of the Brussels School of Lithographers. He died in 1926, aged 46.

Trade union offices
Preceded by New position	General Secretary of the Union of Workers in Lithography and Kindred Trades; 1913–1919	Succeeded by Henri Berckmans
Preceded by Otto Sillier	General Secretary of the International Federation of Lithographers, Lithographic Printers and Kindred Trades; 1920–1926	Succeeded by Henri Berckmans
