= Union of Stone Setters, Pavers and Kindred Trades =

- Verband der Steinsetzer, Pflasterer und Berufsgenossen Deutschlands
- Merged into: Central Union of Stone Workers of Germany
- Founded: 1886
- Dissolved: 31 December 1923
- Affiliations: ADGB

The Union of Stone Setters, Pavers and Kindred Trades (German: Verband der Steinsetzer, Pflasterer und Berufsgenossen) was a trade union representing paviours and people in related trades, in Germany.

The union was founded in 1886. It affiliate to the General Commission of German Trade Unions, and its membership grew steadily, reaching 11,395 by 1913. In 1904, the union organised an international conference of stone setters in Dresden, followed by a conference in 1907, which established the International Federation of Stone Setters.

In 1919, it was a founding affiliate of the General German Trade Union Federation. In 1924, it merged into the Central Union of Stone Workers of Germany.

== Presidents ==
1892: Alexander Knoll
1920:
