= Italian Federation of Hat Workers =

Trade union of Italy

The Italian Federation of Hat Workers (Italian: Federazione italiana lavoranti cappellai, FILC) was a trade union representing hatters in Italy.

== Trade union ==
The union was founded in 1901, on the initiative of the Monza trades council, which itself had been founded by the local hatters' union. From 1902, the union was led by Ettore Reina, a former compositor. By 1902, the union already had 5,220 members, and that year, it achieved the first in a series of collective agreements. In 1906, it became a founding affiliate of the General Confederation of Labour (CGL).

The union focused not just on improving the pay and conditions of its members, but also on solidarity action in the defence of workers more generally. It affiliated to the International Union of Hatters, and from 1921 hosted the international's headquarters. By 1922, its membership had reached 8,470. However, the rise of fascism in Italy led to a decline in membership, and the union was banned in 1926.

After World War II, the union was revived as the Italian Federation of Hat and Allied Workers (FILCA), and it affiliated to the Italian General Confederation of Labour. The industry was in decline, and by 1954, the union's membership was only 4,087. In 1966, the union merged into the new Italian Federation of Textile and Garment Workers.

== General Secretaries ==
1902: Ettore Reina
1927: Union banned
1945: Ettore Reina
1948: Stefano Ongarelli
