= Kahler (surname) =

Kahler is a German surname. Notable people with the surname include:

- Art Kahler (1897–1982), American football and basketball player and coach
- Bob Kahler (1917–2013), American football player and coach
- Carl Kahler (1856–1906), Austrian painter
- Erich Kahler (1885–1970), Czech-American literary scholar and essayist
- Ferdinand N. Kahler (1864–1927), American inventor, entrepreneur and automobile pioneer
- George Kahler (1889–1924), American baseball player
- Hans-Joachim Kahler (1908–2000), German general
- Kris Kahler (born 1983), Australian rugby player
- Otto Kahler (1849–1893), Austrian physician
- Royal Kahler (1918–2005), American football player
- Taibi Kahler (born 1943), American psychologist
- Wolf Kahler (born 1940), German actor

== See also ==
- Kähler (disambiguation)
