= Heinz Deckert =

German trade unionist

- Born: February 2, 1927
- Died: November 11, 2008 (aged 81)
- Occupation: Trade union leader

Heinz Deckert (2 February 1927 – 11 November 2008) was a German trade union leader.

Born in Langenwiesen, Deckert worked as a typesetter. In 1944, he was conscripted into the Reich Labour Service, and then the Wehrmacht, but was taken as a prisoner of war in April 1945. Released at the end of the war, he worked in construction before returning to typesetting. In 1946, he joined the Free German Youth. He also joined the Free German Trade Union Federation (FDGB), and studied at its district school.

In 1950, Deckert was appointed as president of the Industrial Union of Printing and Paper for Weimar and Gera, soon becoming its chair for Thuringia. In 1953, he joined the union's national executive as its chair for Gera, becoming the secretary of the executive in 1958, and vice president of the union in 1959.

From 1961 until 1964, Deckert studied in the Soviet Union, at the Party University of the CPSU, before returning to his post as vice president of the union. In 1966, he was appointed as the union's president, also serving on the presidium of the FDGB. In 1970, he was also appointed as president of the Standing Committee of Trade Unions in the Graphic Industry, in which post he worked closely with the Leonhard Mahlein and the International Graphical Federation.

Deckert retired from his union posts in 1985 and 1986. He died in 2008.

Trade union offices
Preceded by Heinz Oehler	President of the Industrial Union of Printing and Paper; 1966–1985	Succeeded by Werner Peplowski
Preceded by Heinz Oehler	President of the Standing Committee of Trade Unions in the Graphic Industry; 1970–1986	Succeeded by Werner Peplowski
