= International Federation of Lithographers, Lithographic Printers and Kindred Trades =

Global union federation (1896–1949)

The International Federation of Lithographers, Lithographic Printers and Kindred Trades (IFL) was a global union federation bringing together unions representing print workers.

The federation was established in 1896 at a conference in London, as the International Federation of Lithographers and Kindred Trades. It was based in London until 1907, when its headquarters moved to Berlin, then in 1920 they moved to Brussels, and by the mid-1930s, they were in Amstelveen in the Netherlands. By 1925, the federation had 22 affiliates with a total of 45,562 members, and by 1935, its affiliates were from Belgium, Czechoslovakia, Denmark, Finland, France, Hungary, Luxembourg, the Netherlands, Norway, Poland, Romania, Sweden, Switzerland, the UK, and Yugoslavia.

In 1939, the federation agreed to merge with the International Typographers' Secretariat and the International Federation of Bookbinders and Kindred Trades. However, due to World War II, no progress was made until 1946, when the British Printing and Kindred Trades Federation established a committee which drafted a constitution for a merged organisation. This was established in 1949, as the International Graphical Federation.

== Affiliates ==
As of 1921, the following unions were members of the federation:

Union	Country
Amalgamated Society of Lithographic Printers	United Kingdom
Austrian Senefelder Union	Austria
Central Union of Lithographic Workers and Kindred Trades	Belgium
Danish Lithographers' Union	Denmark
Dutch Litho-, Photo- and Chemographers' Union	Netherlands
Federation of Spanish Lithographers and Kindred Trades	Spain
Finnish Printers' and Bookbinders' Union	Finland
French Federation of Book Workers	France
Graphical Union	Czechoslovakia
International Lithographic Union of Sweden	Sweden
Italian Lithographic Federation	Italy
Norwegian Lithographers' Union	Norway
Society of Lithographic Artists, Designers, Engravers and Process Workers	United Kingdom
Swiss Lithographers' Union	Switzerland
Union of Lithographers and Lithographic Printers	Germany

== General Secretaries ==
1896: Charles Harrap
1900: George Davy Kelley
1907: Otto Sillier
1920: François Poels
1927: Henri Berckmans
1929: Jacob Roelofs
