= International Secretariat of Stone Masons =

The International Secretariat of Stone Masons, also known as the International Secretariat of Stone Workers, was a global union federation bringing together trade unions representing stone masons, quarry workers and paviours.

The unions of stone masons in Austria, Germany, Norway, and Sweden, began working together in 1898. In 1903, they decided to form an international federation, which was launched at a conference in Zurich, where its headquarters were also located. In 1923, the small International Secretariat of Stone Setters joined the stone masons, and by 1925 the federation had 14 affiliates, with a total of 108,455 members, growing to 127,500 by 1935.

Throughout the federation's existence, it was led by secretary Robert Kolb. He retired on 1 January 1947, when the federation merged into the International Federation of Building and Wood Workers.

== Affiliates ==
As of 1922, the following unions were affiliated:

Union	Country	Affiliated membership
	Austria	8,500
Union of Belgian Stoneworkers	Belgium	2,580
	Czechoslovakia	5,700
	Denmark	644
	Finland	3,000
	France	3,200
Central Union of Stone Workers of Germany	Germany	62,189
	Hungary	3,500
	Italy	2,787
	Netherlands	1,253
Norwegian Union of Stone Industry Workers	Norway	750
	Serbia	?
Swedish Stone Workers' Union	Sweden	3,118
Swiss Construction Workers' Union	Switzerland	1,800
	Uruguay	2,500
Granite Cutters' International Association	United States	10,000
