= August Brey =

German politician and trade unionist

August Brey (1 August 1864 – 28 July 1937) was a German politician and trade unionist.

Born in Gelnhausen in the Electorate of Hesse, Brey completed an apprenticeship as a shoemaker, and joined the Social Democratic Party of Germany (SPD) in 1885. In 1890, he was a leading founder of the Union of Factory, Agricultural and Commercial Support Workers in Germany (FAV), a general union, and became its president. From 1892, he was also the editor of the union's newspaper, Der Proletariat. In 1906, he led the reform of the FAV as an industrial union, renamed as the Factory Workers' Union of Germany.

In 1906, Brey was elected as the chair of the SPD organisation in Hannover, and he was also elected to represent the party in the Reichstag. He served until it was replaced by the Weimar National Assembly, and then in the Reichstag again. From 1919, he also served in the Prussian State Assembly. In 1925, he was elected as president of the International Federation of General Factory Workers.

In 1931, Brey retired as president of the FAV, and he left his political roles in 1932.

Trade union offices
Preceded by New position	President of the Factory Workers' Union of Germany; 1890–1931	Succeeded by Karl Thiemig
Preceded by James O'Grady	President of the International Federation of General Factory Workers; 1925–1931	Succeeded by Robert Nielsen
