= Central Union of Potters =

Former German Reich trade union (1892–1922)

The Central Union of Potters (German: Zentralverband der Töpfer) was a trade union representing pottery workers in Germany.

A union of potters was founded in 1873, but dissolved in 1878 as a result of the Anti-Socialist Laws. From 1884, a series of congresses of potters were held, and the seventh congress, in 1892, established the new Central Union of Potters. This affiliated to the General Commission of German Trade Unions, and by 1904, it had 10,241 members.

In 1907, the union, led by Adam Drunsel, founded the International Secretariat of Potters.

While most German trade unions grew rapidly in the 1900s and 1910s, the potters did not. By 1913, its membership was 10,882. It was a founding affiliate of the General German Trade Union Federation in 1919. By 1922, the union's membership had crept up to 11,698, and at the end of the year, it merged with the German Construction Workers' Union and the Central Union of Glaziers, to form the German Union of Building Trades.

== Presidents ==
1899: Adam Drunsel
1922: Leopold Bartsch
