= Otto Sillier =

German trade union leader

Otto Sillier (7 November 1857 – 4 March 1925) was a German trade union leader.

Born in Berlin, Sillier completed an apprenticeship as a printmaker, and joined the Senefelder Union. Due to the Anti-Socialist Laws, this later became a friendly society. He joined the Berlin Union of Lithographer and Lithographic Printers in 1885, and in 1891 became the founding president of the Union of Lithographers and Lithographic Printers.

From 1893, Sillier worked full-time for the union, which grew rapidly, absorbing various smaller unions. By 1919, it had 19,110 members, and one of the highest membership densities of any union. In 1896, he was founder of the International Federation of Lithographers, Lithographic Printers and Kindred Trades, and from 1907, he was its general secretary. He visited the United States in 1909 in an attempt to recruit new affiliates to the federation; he was unsuccessful, but did obtain agreements to reduce competition.

Under Sillier's leadership, the union was involved in various disputes. The 10 week lockout of 1905/1906 led to the agreement of a maximum 9-hour working day, but a 1911 strike for an 8-hour day was unsuccessful and nearly led the union into bankruptcy. The stress of this led Sillier to suffer a mental breakdown in 1912, and although he gradually recovered, his physical health worsened during World War I. As a result, from 1913, Johannes Haß effectively ran the union. Sillier remained active in the international, trying to retain affiliates from countries on both sides, by adopting a neutral tone in its journal.

In 1920, Sillier retired, and was granted a pension from his union. He died five years later.

Trade union offices
Preceded by New position	President of the Union of Lithographers and Lithographic Printers; 1891–1920	Succeeded by Johannes Haß
Preceded by George Davy Kelley	General Secretary of the International Federation of Lithographers, Lithographic Printers and Kindred Trades; 1907–1920	Succeeded by François Poels
