= International Federation of Glassworkers =

The International Federation of Glassworkers was a global union federation bringing together trade unions representing workers in the glass industry.

== History ==
The first international trade secretariat of glassworkers was established in 1892 at a conference in Fourmies, Nord. Named the International Glass Workers' Union, its headquarters were at Castleford in England, and it was led by Alfred Greenwood. It organised a second conference, in London, in 1894, but thereafter achieved little, and dissolved in 1900.

In 1908, a conference of glassworkers was held in Paris, to found a new secretariat. This was located in Berlin until 1920, then moved to Paris. One of the smaller international trade secretariats, by 1925 it had 11 affiliates, with a total of 93,000 members. By 1935, it was moribund, and its remaining members joined the International Federation of Industrial Organisations and General Workers' Unions, which held its first glass industry sectional conference in Amsterdam in 1938.

== Affiliates ==
As of 1922, the following unions were affiliated:

Union	Country	Affiliated membership
	Austria	3,798
National Federation of Glass Workers	Belgium	5,466
	Czechoslovakia	30,000
Danish Glass Workers' Union	Denmark	495
Glass Federation	France	4,000
Central Union of Glassworkers	Germany	77,948
Dutch Union of Glass and Pottery Workers	Netherlands	2,266
	Sweden	1,000
National Flint Glass Makers' Society of Great Britain and Ireland	United Kingdom	10,000

== General Secretaries ==
1908: Emil Girbig
1921: Charles Delzant
