= German Construction Workers' Union =

Former German Reich trade union (1911–1922)

- Deutscher Bauarbeiter-Verband
- Predecessor: Central Union of Masons; Central Union of Construction Workers
- Merged into: German Union of Building Trades
- Founded: 1 January 1911
- Dissolved: 31 December 1922
- Headquarters: 1 Wallstraße, Hamburg
- Location: Germany
- Members: 235,217 (1911)
- Publication: Der Grundstein
- Affiliations: ADGB, IFBW

The German Construction Workers' Union (German: Deutscher Bauarbeiter-Verband, DBV) was a trade union representing building workers in Germany.

The union was founded on 1 January 1911, when the Central Union of Masons merged with the Central Union of Construction Workers, the two bringing together 235,217 members. The Central Union of Plasterers joined at the start of 1912. The union affiliated to the General Commission of German Trade Unions, and in 1919 became a founding affiliate of the General German Trade Union Confederation. It was also the leading union in the International Federation of Building Workers.

On 1 January 1923, the union merged with the Central Union of Glaziers and the Central Union of Potters, to form the German Union of Building Trades.

== Presidents ==
1911: Theodor Bömelburg
1913: Fritz Paeplow
