= Union of Bookbinders and Paper Workers of Germany =

- Verband der Buchbinder and Papierverarbeiter Deutschlands
- Successor: Industrial Union of Printing and Paper (E Germany), Printing and Paper Union (W Germany)
- Founded: 4 April 1885
- Dissolved: 2 May 1933
- Headquarters: Neuer Markt 8/12, Berlin
- Location: Germany
- Members: 55,128 (1928)
- Publication: Buchbinder-Zeitung
- Affiliations: ADGB, IFBKT

The Union of Bookbinders and Paper Workers of Germany (German: Verband der Buchbinder and Papierverarbeiter Deutschlands) was a trade union representing workers involved in manufacturing paper and binding books in Germany.

== History ==
A loose national association of bookbinders was formed in 1882 by various local unions, and they formally merged into a single union at a conference in Offenbach am Main on 4 April 1885. It adopted as its journal the Buchbinder-Zeitung, which had been published since 1880, and in 1904 established a head office in Berlin.

The union played a leading role in establishing the International Federation of Bookbinders and Kindred Trades. In 1919, it became a founding affiliate of the General German Trade Union Confederation. Within the federation, it was part of the Graphic Block. By 1928, the union had 55,128 members. It was banned by the Nazi government in 1933. After World War II, bookbinders and paper workers were represented as part of the Printing and Paper Union.

== Presidents ==
1885: Adam Dietrich
1904: Emil Kloth
1919: Eugen Haueisen
