= STP =

STP may refer to:

== Places ==
- São Tomé and Príncipe (ISO 3166-1 alpha-3 code, IOC country code, and FIFA country code STP)
- St Pancras railway station (National Rail code STP)
- St. Paul Downtown Airport (IATA airport code STP) in Saint Paul, Minnesota, US
- South Texas Nuclear Generating Station, also known as the South Texas Project

== Business ==
- German Union of Saddlers, Upholsterers and Portfolio Makers, a former German trade union
- Segmenting-targeting-positioning, a framework in marketing
- Straight-through processing, in securities transaction
- Party of Finnish Labor (Suomalaisen Työn Puolue)
- Workers' Party of Finland (Suomen Työväenpuolue)
- Soviet-type economic planning

== Arts and entertainment ==
=== Television ===
- Star Trek: Picard (2020 TV series), an American science fiction TV series
- Star Trek: Prodigy (2021 TV series), an American science fiction children's TV series

=== Music ===
- Stone Temple Pilots, an American rock band
- Slaughter to Prevail, a Russian deathcore band
- "S.T.P.", a song on the album Robbin' the Hood by the band Sublime
- STP, an American band with Julia Cafritz

== Science, technology, and industry ==
=== Biology and medicine ===
- 2,5-Dimethoxy-4-methylamphetamine, also called DOM or "serenity, tranquility, and peace"
- Scientist Training Programme, a UK healthcare training scheme under Modernising Scientific Careers
- Sustainability and transformation plan, a scheme in NHS England
- Stand-to-pee device, a female urination device

=== Computing ===
- ISO 10303-21, the STEP CAD exchange file extension
- Serial ATA Tunneling Protocol, supporting SATA devices in SAS bays
- Server Time Protocol, to synchronize clocks
- Shielded twisted pair, a type of cable
- Signal Transfer Point, an SS7 packet switch
- Spanning Tree Protocol, a network protocol used for loop prevention
- Schedule Transfer Protocol, a network protocol designed for low-latency data transfer
- Software Technology Parks of India
- Straight-through processing, without repeating data entry for a financial transaction

=== Transportation ===
- Solar Terrestrial Probes program, a series of NASA missions
- STP (motor oil company)
- Space Test Program, a spaceflight provider for US DoD
- St Pancras railway station (National Rail code STP)
- St. Paul Downtown Airport (IATA airport code STP) in Saint Paul, Minnesota, US

=== Other uses in science, technology, and industry ===
- Standard temperature and pressure, 0 °C and 100 kPa
- Sewage Treatment Plant, a site where wastewater is cleaned
- Shovel test pit, a method of archaeological survey
- Sodium triphosphate, used in detergents, etc.
- Silane-terminated polymers
- Significant tornado parameter, a model-based tornado prediction index
- Suntech Power (NYSE symbol STP)
- South Texas Nuclear Generating Station, also known as the South Texas Project
- German Union of Saddlers, Upholsterers and Portfolio Makers, a former German trade union

== Other uses ==
- Society for Threatened Peoples, an international NGO
- Sacrae Theologiae Professor, a Catholic degree
- Seattle to Portland Bicycle Classic
- 25 metre standard pistol, a shooting sport
- Sticky toffee pudding
