= Central Union of Glassworkers =

Former German Reich trade union

The Central Union of Glassworkers (German: Zentralverband der Glasarbeiter und -arbeiterinnen Deutschlands) was a trade union representing people involved in manufacturing glass and glass objects in Germany.

The union was founded in 1890, as the Union of Glassworkers of Germany, and it affiliated to the General Commission of German Trade Unions. From 1897, it was led by Emil Girbig. In 1907, it became the "Central Union of Glassworkers", and from 1908, it hosted the headquarters of the International Federation of Glassworkers.

In 1919, the union was a founding constituent of the General German Trade Union Confederation, and by 1920, it had 62,245 members. In 1926, it merged into the Factory Workers' Union of Germany.
