= Union of Saddlers and Portfolio Makers =

The Union of Saddlers and Portfolio Makers (German: Verband der Sattler und Portefeuiller) was a trade union representing workers involved in making saddles, bags and wallets.

The union was founded on 1 July 1909, when the Union of Portfolio and Leather Workers merged with the General German Saddlers' Union. It was based in Berlin, and initially brought together 10,055 members. It was led by Peter Blum, former president of the saddlers, while the vice president was Hermann Weinschild, former leader of the portfolio workers. The union published Sattler- und Portefeuiller-Zeitung, initially edited by Fritz Müntner, and from 1911 by Weinschild.

Like its predecessors, the union affiliated to the General Commission of German Trade Unions, while in 1919, it was a founder of its successor, the General German Trade Union Federation. It was also the leading force in the International Federation of Saddlers' Unions, led by Johannes Sassenbach.

On 2 April 1920, the union merged with the Union of Upholsterers and Kindred Trades of Germany, to form the German Union of Saddlers, Upholsterers and Portfolio Makers.
