= Ettore Reina =

Italian politician (1871–1958)

Ettore Reina (27 July 1871 – 8 November 1958) was an Italian politician and trade union leader.

Born in Milan, Reina was orphaned at the age of 13. He entered an orphanage, and was able to complete an apprenticeship as a compositor before he left, five years later. He became interested in socialism, joining the "Order and Work" friendly society, and the Italian Socialist Party (PSI), first standing for the party in 1897.

In 1898, Reina became secretary of the Monza Trades Council, founding and editing the La Brianza Lavoratrice journal. He became heavily involved with the local hatmakers, helping them negotiate a collective agreement in 1899, and then leading the formation of the Italian Federation of Hat Workers (FILC) in 1902. He became the leader of the new union, and in 1906 it became a founding affiliate of the General Confederation of Labour (CGL), Reina serving on the federation's executive.

In 1919, Reina was elected to the Chamber of Deputies, representing Milan, serving until 1921. In 1922, he left the PSI, joining the reformist Unitary Socialist Party split. From 1921 until 1928, he also served as general secretary of the International Union of Hatters.

After the fascist rise to power, the Italian trade union movement was banned. Mussolini asked Reina to lead a new federation of fascist trade unions, but Reina rejected the offer, and instead maintained underground union and social democratic activity, while working as a proofreader for a coal company. In 1940, he was briefly interned. On release, he began assisting refugees, and at the end of the war, he stood unsuccessfully for various political posts. FILC was revived, and Reina appears to have again become general secretary, retiring in 1947.

Trade union offices
| Preceded by New position | General Secretary of the Italian Federation of Hat Workers; 1902–1947 | Succeeded by Stefano Ongarelli |
| Preceded by Alfred Metzschke | General Secretary of the International Union of Hatters; 1921–1928 | Succeeded by Post abolished |
