= General German Trade Union Federation =

German trade union federation of the Weimar era

- Allgemeiner Deutsche Gewerkschaftsbund
- Predecessor: General Commission of German Trade Unions
- Successor: German Trade Union Confederation (W Germany); Free German Trade Union Federation (E Germany)
- Founded: 5 July 1919
- Dissolved: 2 May 1933
- Headquarters: 6 Inselstraße, Berlin
- Location: Germany
- Members: 7,890,102 (1920)
- Chairman: Carl Legien (1919–1920); Theodor Leipart (1921–1933)
- Publication: Gewerkschafts-Zeitung
- Affiliations: IFTU

The General German Trade Union Federation (German: Allgemeiner Deutscher Gewerkschaftsbund, ADGB) was a confederation of trade unions in Germany founded during the Weimar Republic. It was founded in 1919 and was initially powerful enough to organize a general strike in 1920 against a right-wing coup d'état. After the 1929 Wall Street crash, the ensuing Great Depression caused widespread unemployment. The ADGB suffered a dramatic loss of membership, both from unemployment and political squabbles. By the time the Nazis seized control of the government, the ADGB's leadership had distanced itself from the Social Democratic Party of Germany (SPD) and was openly cooperating with Nazis in an attempt to keep the organization alive. Nonetheless, on 2 May 1933 the SA and SS stormed the offices of the ADGB and its member trade unions, seized their assets and arrested their leaders, crushing the organization.

== History ==
The ADGB was founded on 5 July 1919 in Nuremberg after the first postwar congress of free trade unions. The ADGB was founded as the new umbrella organization to succeed the General Commission of Germany's Trade Unions (Generalkommission der Gewerkschaften Deutschlands). Carl Legien was elected as the first chairman.

It was an amalgamation of 52 German trade unions and was affiliated with the General Federation of Free Employees (AfA-Bund) and the General German Civil Service Federation (Allgemeiner Deutscher Beamtenbund). The adjective "Allgemeiner" ("general") (Note: The adjective "allgemeiner" is sometimes awkward to translate. In this case, it has the sense of "across-the-board".) was added to the name because in March 1919, the Christian and liberal trade unions had already founded umbrella organizations called the Deutscher Gewerkschaftsbund.

An influential mass organization under Legien's leadership, it organized a general strike in 1920 to counter the right-wing Kapp Putsch. Roughly 12 million workers took part, halting all production, transportation, mining and public services and, as The New York Times wrote, "giving the Kapp régime its death blow".

The free trade unions were not politically neutral; rather, they saw themselves as the economic arm of the socialist labor movement. Next to the free trade unions, were the Christian trade unions and the liberal unions. Neither were ever able to reach the membership numbers of the free trade unions. In 1920, the unions of the ADGB had over 8 million members, but the Great Depression at the end of the decade caused high unemployment, leading to a substantial drop in the membership of member unions. By the end of 1932, there were an estimated 3.5 million members.

Despite the split in the SPD during World War I, the free trade unions continued to remain close to the SPD, the largest working class political party. Together, the SPD and the ADGB fought for the introduction unemployment benefits and a legally mandated eight-hour workday, which was gutted by regulations established in 1923. At the end of 1931, they united with the Reichsbanner and workers' sport clubs to form the Iron Front against the growing threat of the Nazi Party.

At first, ADGB unions were open to members of other working class political parties including the Communist Party of Germany (KPD). This changed in 1929, when the KPD, under pressure from the Soviet Union, began to run competing candidates at factory works council elections. The Revolutionäre Gewerkschafts Opposition (RGO), was founded in December 1929 as a communist opposition labor organization, hoping to draw left-wing unionists away from the ADGB., which led to the expulsion of many communists from the ADGB. By March 1932, the RGO had about 200,000 members.

The evening of the day Hitler was declared to be the new chancellor by president Hindenburg, January 30, Walter Ulbricht of the communist party delivered a renewed proposal for a joint call for a general strike, similar to the successful strike against the Kapp Putsch of 1920, to the ADGB general union. The trade unions and SPD declined the offer and issued, opposing it, leaflets, posters and articles calling workers to ignore all calls for a strike issued solely by the communist party during February and March 1933.

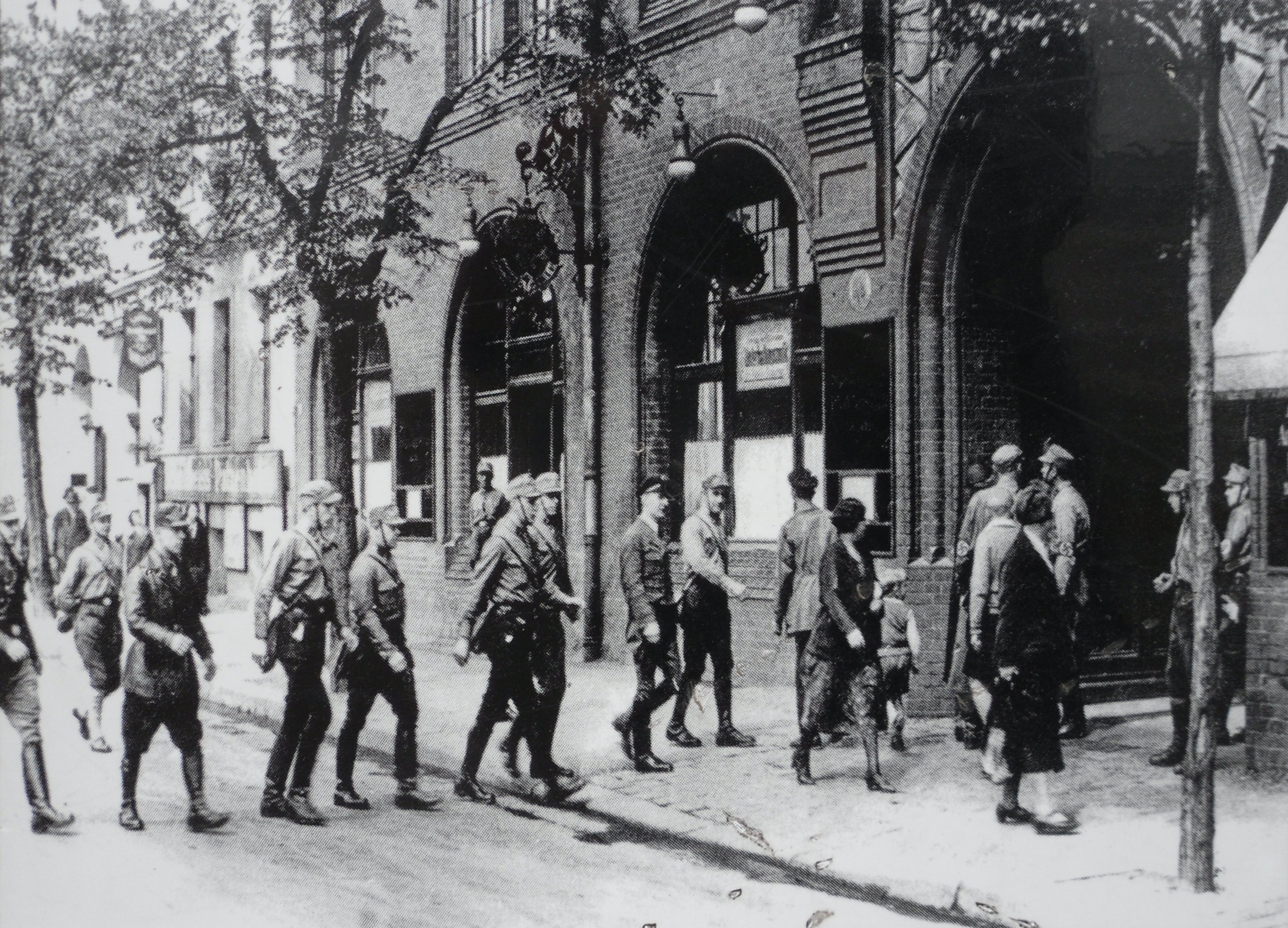
SA troops occupy the trade union building in what is now Engeldamm (Berlin), 2 May 1933.

After the Nazis seized power in the election of March 1933, the trade union leadership tried to save their organizations by pandering to the Nazi Party and in April 1933, offered "to put themselves in service to the new state". At the same time, ADGB chairman Theodor Leipart, began to distance himself from the SPD and declared the ADGB to be politically neutral. This policy resulted in the call by the national board to partake in "National Labor Day", the Nazi version of International Workers' Day, (also called "May Day"), a left-wing celebration of labor, and led to a break with the International Federation of Trade Unions. Even as the Nazis were planning to storm union offices, ADGB leaders met with leaders of the Christian and liberal labor organization for talks about a merger in the hopes of forestalling a prohibition of organized labor.

These efforts failed to prevent the free trade unions from a nationwide surprise attack the day after May Day, just two months later. On 2 May 1933 all ADGB member union were stormed, their offices occupied and assets seized by the SA, SS and the National Socialist Factory Cell Organization. Officials were put in "protective custody" and many trade unionists were maltreated. In Duisburg, four trade union officials were brutally murdered.

== Non-profit entities ==
The ADGB operated several non-profit companies. In 1924, a workers' bank was founded, the Bank der Deutschen Arbeit. On 29 July 1928 the cornerstone was laid for the Bundesschule des Allgemeinen Deutschen Gewerkschaftsbundes (ADGB Trade Union School) in Bernau bei Berlin, Brandenburg. The school operated for only three years, until the Nazis gained power, after which the Nazis used part of the school to train the SS.

== ADGB school after the war ==
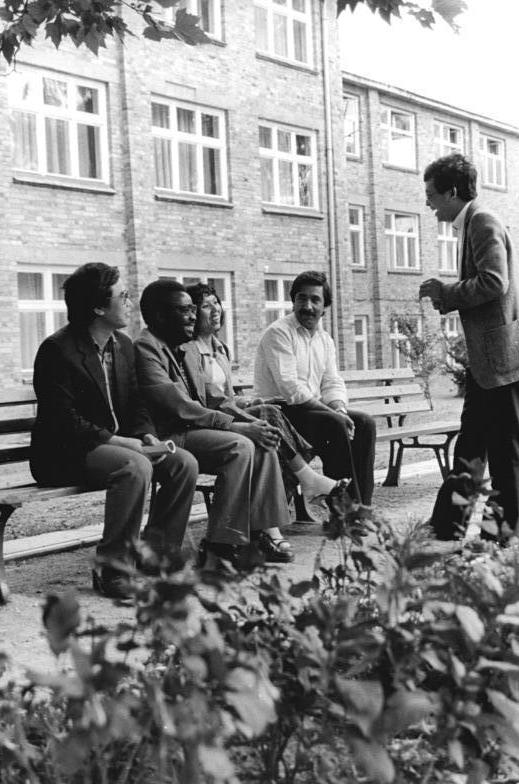
Foreign trainees at the trade union school in 1986

After World War II, the school was used by occupying Russian military forces and from 1946 by the Free German Trade Union Federation (FDGB), an East German organisation. Its existence was forgotten and the 12-acre site was not open to the public. Only after the fall of the Berlin Wall, was it rediscovered. The East Germans had made significant renovations to the building to the extent that it was not recognized by architects looking for it after 1989.

The original complex was designed by the newly appointed director of the Bauhaus School, Hannes Meyer and his colleague Hans Wittwer. The design followed its architects' . The complex needed to house facilities to train and educate 120 people. The result was a Z-Shaped series of buildings that housed class-rooms, library, gymnasium and dining hall along with the insertion of a glass-blocked ceiling. Despite the extremely functional approach, materials were used in an expressive way including concrete, glass blocks and steel encasement windows.

The complex was restored to its former glory following a Europe-wide competition for the contract. The Berlin Chamber of Crafts paid a portion of the costs and has used it as a training school since 2007. In 2008 the restoration project won the architects, Brenne Gesellschaft von Architekten, the World Monuments Fund / Knoll Modernism Prize. In July 2017 the former ADGB Trade Union School was added to the UNESCO World Heritage Site the Bauhaus and its Sites in Weimar, Dessau and Bernau.

== Affiliates ==
The following unions held membership of the federation:

Union	Abbreviation	Affiliated	Left	Reason for leaving	Membership (1920)	Membership (1928)
Central Union of Asphalters and Roof Felters of Germany		1919	1924	Merged into DBB	2,093	N/A
Central Union of Bakers and Confectioners		1919	1927	Merged into VNG	65,077	N/A
Central Union of Butchers		1919	1927	Merged into VNG	24,473	N/A
Central Union of Carpenters and Kindred Trades of Germany		1919	1933	Banned	87,024	107,354
Central Union of Chimney Sweeps		1919	1933	Banned	3,380	2,980
Central Union of Employees	ZdA	1919	1921	Transferred to AfA-Bund	363,521	N/A
Central Union of Glassworkers		1919	1926	Merged into VFD	62,245	N/A
Central Union of Glaziers and Related Professionals		1919	1922	Merged into DBB	4,185	N/A
Central Union of Hotel, Restaurant and Cafe Employees	ZVHRC	1920	1933	Banned	N/A	27,153
Central Union of Machinists and Stokers	VMH	1919	1933	Banned	100,287	48,568
Central Union of Potters		1919	1922	Merged into DBB	11,391	N/A
Central Union of Roofers		1919	1931	Merged into DBB	10,970	10,843
Central Union of Ship Builders of Germany		1919	1924	Merged into DMV	4,966	N/A
Central Union of Shoemakers of Germany	ZVdSch	1919	1933	Banned	90,008	78,834
Central Union of Stone Workers of Germany		1919	1933	Banned	45,476	68,033
Factory Workers Union of Germany	VFD	1919	1933	Banned	646,931	457,657
Film Union		1919	1930	Merged into GV	9,923	1,300
General Union of Public Sector and Transport Workers	GV	1930	1933	Banned	N/A	N/A
General Milking Union of Germany		1919	1933	Banned	10,000	11,456
German Agricultural Workers' Union	DLV	1919	1933	Banned	624,935	151,273
German Clothing Workers' Union	DBAV	1919	1933	Banned	133,470	77,884
German Construction Workers' Union	DBV	1919	1922	Merged into DBB	465,744	N/A
German Furriers' Union		1919	1923	Merged into DBAV	9,977	N/A
German Hat Workers' Union	DHAV	1919	1933	Banned	23,132	18,509
German Leather Workers' Union		1919	1933	Banned	35,339	37,855
German Metal Workers' Union	DMV	1919	1933	Banned	1,632,670	884,027
German Musicians' Union	DeMuV	1919	1933	Banned	47,199	23,055
German Painters' Union		1919	1933	Banned	54,278	58,775
German Polishers' Union		1919	1922	Transferred to AfA-Bund	10,210	N/A
German Railway Union	DEV	1919	1925	Merged into EdED	503,125	N/A
German Textile Workers' Union	DTAV	1919	1933	Banned	535,369	306,137
German Tobacco Workers' Union		1919	1933	Banned	110,964	75,501
German Transport Workers' Union	DTV	1919	1929	Merged into GV	585,942	368,052
German Union of Building Trades	DBB	1923	1933	Banned	N/A	435,156
German Union of Saddlers, Upholsterers and Portfolio Makers	STP	1920	1933	Banned	38,153	30,614
German Wood Workers' Union	DHV	1919	1933	Banned	378,957	306,660
German Xylographers' Union		1919	1921	Merged into VDLS	N/A	N/A
International Artists' Lodge	IAL	1920	1921	Transferred to AfA-Bund	7,531	N/A
Music Engravers' Assistants' Union		1919	1920	Merged into VDLS	N/A	N/A
Union of Bookbinders and Paper Workers of Germany	VBPD	1919	1933	Banned	81,557	55,128
Union of Brewery and Mill Workers		1919	1927	Merged into VNG	73,286	N/A
Union of Cooks		1920	1920	Merged into ZVHRC	6,200	N/A
Union of Coopers, Cellar Managers, and Helpers in Germany		1919	1927	Merged into VNG	12,955	N/A
Union of Coppersmiths of Germany		1919	1933	Banned	6,877	7,024
Union of Upholsterers of Germany		1919	1920	Merged into STP	N/A	N/A
Union of Domestic Workers of Germany		1919	1923	Merged into DTV	20,014	N/A
Union of Food and Drink Workers	VNG	1927	1933	Banned	N/A	159,636
Union of Gardeners and Nursery Workers		1919	1929	Merged into GV	23,143	10,518
Union of German Book Printers	VDDB	1919	1933	Banned	74,000	82,767
Union of German Professional Firefighters	VDB	1921	1929	Merged into GV	N/A	7,740
Union of German Restaurant Workers		1919	1920	Merged into ZVHRC	63,243	N/A
Union of Graphic Assistants of Germany	VGHA	1919	1933	Banned	39,505	40,691
Union of Hairdressers and Assistants		1919	1931	Merged into GV	10,049	4,057
Union of Hotel, Restaurant and Cafe Employees		1919	1920	Merged into ZVHRC	18,000	N/A
Union of Lithographers and Lithographic Printers	VDLS	1919	1933	Banned	19,110	23,719
Union of Miners of Germany		1919	1933	Banned	467,339	196,049
Union of Municipal and State Workers	VGS	1919	1929	Merged into GV	297,950	243,968
Union of Porcelain and Related Workers of Germany		1919	1926	Merged into VFD	55,547	N/A
Union of Saddlers and Portfolio Makers		1919	1920	Merged into STP	N/A	N/A
Union of Stone Setters, Pavers and Kindred Trades		1919	1924	Merged into Stone Workers	11,194	N/A
United Union of German Railway Workers	EdED	1925	1933	Banned	N/A	240,913

== See also ==
- Cuno strikes
- Gewerkschaftsbund des Memelgebietes
- Verband der Fabrikarbeiter Deutschlands
- ADGB Trade Union School
