= Central Union of Masons =

Former German Empire trade union (1891–1910)

- Zentralverband der Maurer
- Merged into: German Construction Workers' Union
- Founded: May 1891
- Dissolved: 1 January 1911
- Headquarters: Besenbinderhof 56, Hamburg
- Members: 128,850 (1904)
- Publication: Der Grundstein
- Affiliations: GGD, IFBW

The Central Union of Masons (German: Zentralverband der Maurer) was a trade union representing bricklayers in Germany.

Regular conferences of masons were held in Germany in the 1880s. With the repeal of the Anti-Socialist Laws, it was possible to form legal trade unions, and at the 8th Congress of Masons, in Gotha, in May 1891, the Central Union of Masons was established. It adopted Der Grundstein as its journal.

The union gradually built up international contacts in the late 19th century. In 1903, it called a conference in Berlin to formalise these relationships by establishing the International Federation of Building Workers.

The union affiliated to the General Commission of German Trade Unions, and by 1904, it was the second largest in Germany, with 128,850 members. By 1910, this had risen to 169,645. At the start of 1911, it merged with the Central Union of Construction Workers to form the German Construction Workers' Union.

== Presidents ==
1891: Adolf Dammann
1894: Theodor Bömelburg
