= Luise Kähler =

German Trade Union leader and politician (1869–1955)

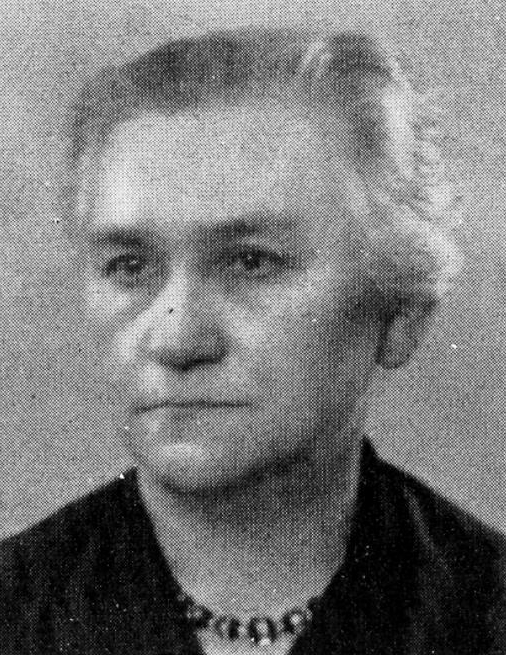
- Kähler c. 1932
- Born: Luise Girnth; 12 January 1869; Berlin, Kingdom of Prussia
- Died: 22 September 1955 (aged 86); East Berlin, East Germany
- Occupations: Trade unionist, politician

Luise Kähler (12 January 1869 – 22 September 1955) was a German socialist, trade union leader and politician. She was one of a small number of women union officials that held a prominent position within Germany's trade unions in the first half of the 20th century. She was a member of the Prussian Landtag from 1923 to 1933. She opposed National Socialism and was largely inactive after Hitler came to power in 1933. After the Second World War, she became a founding member of the Socialist Unity Party of Germany, the ruling party in the German Democratic Republic.

== Early life ==
Luise Girnth was born in Berlin in the Kingdom of Prussia in 1869. She was the daughter of a hackney cab driver with origins in Silesia and received little formal education beyond primary school. She entered service as a domestic servant in Berlin in 1883. In 1888, she was apprenticed as a tailor before moving to Hamburg to work as a seamstress around 1893. She worked on a German merchant ship out of Hamburg, for two years from 1893 to 1895. Upon her return to Hamburg, she married the painter August Kähler.

== Activist ==
Kähler joined the Social Democratic Party of Germany in 1902 and increasingly became more political active and astute. In November 1906, she became the co-founder and first chairwoman of an embryonic union for women working in domestic trades in Hamburg by representing her members against exploitation by private employers and agencies. The union quickly grew in membership. Within a year, it had 480 members, which necessitated affiliation to the national body by 1907. Kähler was appointed as de facto branch secretary of the Hamburg branch in 1909 serving in that capacity until 1913. She was one of a small number of women union officials that included Wilhelmine Kähler (no relation) and Emma Ihrer and after Ihrer's death arguably became the most notable one of the time.

In 1913, she became the president of the Union of Domestic Workers of Germany, which required her to move back to her home city of Berlin. During the First World War, Kähler supported left-wing SPD politicians, that included Clara Zetkin and Rosa Luxemburg in rejecting the party's policy of Burgfrieden (a truce with the government, promising to refrain from any strikes during the war) and attended an international socialist women's anti-war conference in Berlin organised by Zetkin in 1915. After the war, Berlin and the rest of Germany witnessed a period of politically-driven civil conflict known as the German Revolution during which the imperial government was replaced by the Weimar Republic. As a notable feminist and union official, Kähler was instrumental in leading her union through the turmoil caused by the civil unrest. The new republic in Germany needed to reform its archaic domestic servant laws, particularly since thousands of domestic workers were giving up their employment as the economy of the Weimar Republic went into free fall. Many smaller unions survived only by merging into larger conglomerations.

Kähler was invited by the chairman, Fritz Kater, to affiliate her union within the larger and more influential Free Association of German Trade Unions in which she took a prominent position in the Foundation of Workers' Welfare Associations (Arbeiterwohlfahrt). She was a member of the Prussian Landtag from 1923 to 1933, advising on economic matters. It was unusual for a woman in the 1920s and the 1930s to be in a position of power within the German union movement, and Kähler became one of Germany's most visible female trade union officials and represented the movement at the 1927 International Trade Union Congress, held in Paris.

She opposed the National Socialists, who were in government under Chancellor Adolf Hitler from 1933. As a prominent unionist, she was sidelined and watched closely by the authorities throughout the remainder of the 1930s and during World War II. There is evidence that she conspired against the authorities, but unlike other socialist and communist leaders, she was not purged by the government. She was, however, forced into a period of inactivity, as the majority of Germany's unions were disbanded and banned.

== Postwar ==
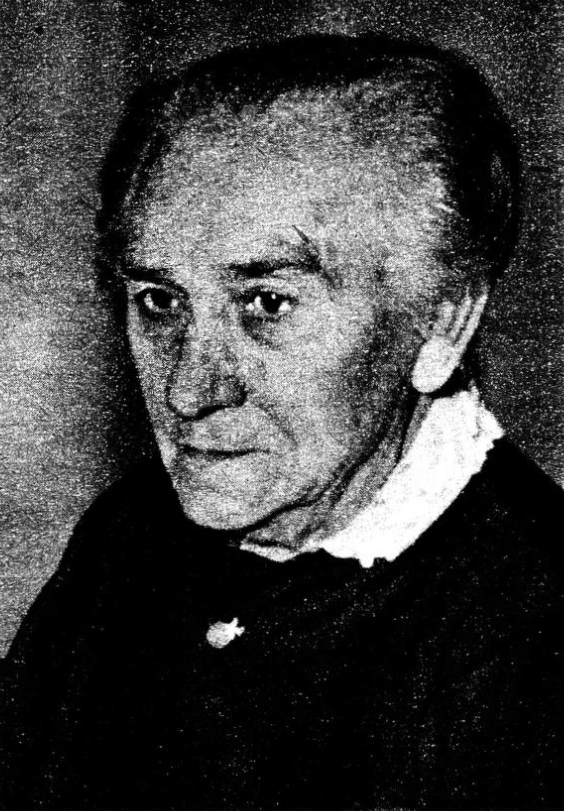
Kähler c. 1953

At the conclusion of World War II, she once again became active in the Social Democratic Party. Although she lived in West Berlin, she ran for election to the Berlin Chamber of Deputies in East Berlin and represented the district of Kreuzberg. In 1948, she was appointed an honorary member of the Democratic Women's League of Germany, a socialist organisation taking shape in the eastern part of Germany. In 1949, Germany was formally divided, and she became a founding member of the Socialist Unity Party of Germany, the ruling party in the German Democratic Republic.

She was amongst the first recipients of the highest civilian honour of the German Democratic Republic, the Order of Karl Marx, which she was awarded in 1953. She died in September 1955 in East Berlin.
