= United Union of German Railway Workers =

- Einheitsverband der Eisenbahner Deutschlands
- Successor: Industrial Union of Railways (E Germany), TRANSNET Gewerkschaft (W Germany)
- Founded: 27 June 1925
- Dissolved: 2 May 1933
- Location: Germany
- Publication: Der Deutsche Eisenbahner
- Affiliations: ADGB, ITF

The United Union of German Railway Workers (German: Einheitsverband der Eisenbahner Deutschlands, EdED) was a trade union representing railway workers in Germany.

The union was founded on 27 June 1925, when the German Railway Union merged with the National Union of German Railway Officials and Trainees. On formation, the union had 197,000 members, rising to 240,913 by the end of 1928, making it the largest union in the industry. It was led by Franz Scheffel, and published several journals, the most important of which was Der Deutsche Eisenbahner.

The union was affiliated to the General German Trade Union Confederation (ADGB), and to the International Transport Workers' Federation (ITF). In March 1933, the union's journal was banned by the Nazi government. The leadership of the ADGB decided to distance itself from social democracy in an attempt to appease the Nazis, and Scheffel resigned as leader of the EdED in protest. He was replaced by Matthew Herrmann, but in May, the unions were banned.

The EdED attempted to continue on an underground basis, led former board member Hans Jahn, and some organisation was maintained throughout World War II, in resistance to the Nazis. In 1948, TRANSNET was established, as a new union to represent railway workers.

== Presidents ==
1925: Franz Scheffel
1933: Matthäus Herrmann
