= Hugo Poetzsch =

Hugo Poetzsch (18 November 1863 – 1946) was a German trade unionist and social democratic activist.

Born in Colditz, Kingdom of Saxony, Poetzsch found work in hotels in France, Belgium, the United Kingdom, Switzerland and Italy. In 1891, he moved to Berlin and joined the recently formed union of hospitality workers in the city. Before the end of the year, he was elected as editor of the union's newspaper, Der Gastwirtsgehilfe. This was distributed across the country, and so when in 1893 a national agitation committee for the industry was formed, Poetzsch played a leading role. He saw his primary role as informing workers in the industry about their relationship with business owners and recruitment agencies. He also campaigned against the reliance of hospitality staff on tips.

In 1898, the local unions of hospitality workers formed the Union of German Restaurant Workers, and Poetzsch was elected as its president. The union grew rapidly under his leadership, and also established the International Union of Hotel, Restaurant and Bar Workers (IUHR). In 1912, Poetzsch resigned as leader of the union to become editor of the Social Democratic Party of Germany's journal, Sozialdemokratischen Partei-Korrespondenz. He maintained his links with the hospitality workers, serving as general secretary of the IUHR until World War I, and as director of Der Gastwirtsgehilfe until 1919.

In 1919, Poetzsch became a magistrate in Berlin, and resigned all his paid union posts, while remaining a member of the Restaurant Workers. In the 1920s, he wrote a history of the German Union of Restaurant Workers, and also one of the Austrian Union of Hospitality Workers. He died in 1946.

Trade union offices
Preceded by New position	President of the Union of German Restaurant Workers; 1898–1912	Succeeded by Robert Zeiske
Preceded by Albert Baumeister	General Secretary of the International Union of Hotel, Restaurant and Bar Workers; 1912–1914	Succeeded by J. G. van Heusden
