= Gewerkschaftsbund des Memelgebiets =

Former trade union center

Gewerkschaftsbund des Memelgebiets ('Trade Union of the Memel Territory') was a trade union centre in the Memel Territory. It was an affiliate of the International Federation of Trade Unions 1923-1937. The centre had five branches and was linked to the German ADGB. Westphal was the chairman of the organization, Seewald its secretary. The organization published Der Gewekschaftsbund as its organ. As of late 1923, the organization claimed to have 1,907 members.
