= Heinz Oehler =

German trade union leader

Heinz Oehler (1 February 1920 – 26 September 1973) was a German trade union leader.

Born in Altenberg, Oehler became a printer. In 1939, he was conscripted into the Wehrmacht, serving until he was taken as a prisoner of war in 1945. He was released at the end of the war, and briefly worked in agriculture before returning to printing. He joined the Free German Trade Union Federation (FDGB) and the Socialist Unity Party of Germany (SED).

In 1950, Oehler became part of the management of the Pierersche Druckerei printing firm. After taking a course at the Fritz Heckert College in Bernau, he began teaching there, and he also studied at the Parteihochschule Karl Marx. In 1960, he became head of the teaching staff at Fritz Heckert, then deputy director.

In 1961, Oehler was appointed as the president of the Industrial Union of Printing and Paper, also serving on the executive of the FDGB. In 1966, he returned to Fritz Heckert as its deputy director, then director in 1969. He remained involved in the printing union, and in 1967 he became the founding president of the Standing Committee of Trade Unions in the Graphic Industry. He died in 1973, still in office.

Trade union offices
Preceded by Heinz Meier	President of the Industrial Union of Printing and Paper; 1961–1966	Succeeded by Heinz Deckert
Preceded by New position	President of the Standing Committee of Trade Unions in the Graphic Industry; 1967–1970	Succeeded by Heinz Deckert
