= Charles Delzant =

French anarchist (1874–1943)

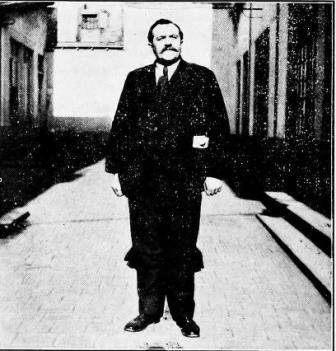
Delzant in 1906

Charles Delzant (1 January 1874 – 28 June 1943) was a French trade unionist and anarchist.

== Biography ==
Born in Fresnes-sur-Escaut, Delzant worked as a glassmaker. He was a founder of the L'Action anarchist group, whose other members included a young Pierre Monatte. He also became president of the glass bottle makers' union of Fresnes and Escautpont, and in 1900, he represented it at the congress of the General Confederation of Labour (CGT).

In 1902, various glassworkers' unions affiliated to the CGT founded the Glassworkers' Federation, and Delzant was elected as its first general secretary. He also became editor of its newspaper, La Voix des Verriers, using the position in particular to campaign against harsh conditions for child workers.

Delzant was conscripted in 1914, and served in the French Army, describing the conflict as inevitable, and professing no opinion on it beyond that, a position which was strongly criticised by other anarchists. After a short period, he was permitted to transfer to work making steel, but he remained under military discipline until 1918.

After World War I, Delzant relaunched the Glassworkers' Federation, with the assistance of Louis Monnier. He became part of the majority in the CGT, not joining its revolutionary split, the United General Confederation of Labour. In 1921, he was elected as general secretary of the International Federation of Glassworkers, serving in the role until 1935, when the federation ceased to operate. By this time, Delzant was a member of the French Section of the Workers' International.

Trade union offices
Preceded by New position	General Secretary of the Glassworkers' Federation; 1902–1937?	Succeeded by François Süe?
Preceded by Emil Girbig	General Secretary of the International Federation of Glassworkers; 1921–1935	Succeeded by Federation dissolved
