= Carpenters' International =

Former global union federation (1903–1925)

The Carpenters' International (German: Zimmerer-Internationale) was a global union federation bringing together unions representing carpenters.

The federation was established on 1 April 1903, on the initiative of the Central Union of Carpenters and Kindred Trades of Germany. This union provided the leadership for the international, and remained its largest affiliate. At its peak, the union also had affiliates from Austria, Bohemia, Denmark, Hungary, the Netherlands, and Switzerland, but by 1923, it was left with only the German and Danish unions.

The federation's final leader was Adolph Schönfelder. In 1925, it merged into the larger International Federation of Woodworkers, which allocated one seat on its four-person executive to a representative of the carpenters, this initially being Wilhelm Wolgast.

== General Secretaries ==
1903: Friedrich Schrader
1921: Adolph Schönfelder
