= Central Union of Roofers =

- Zentralverband der Dachdecker Deutschlands
- Successor: German Union of Building Trades
- Founded: 1889
- Dissolved: May 2, 1933
- Location: Germany
- Affiliations: ADGB

Central Union of Roofers (German: Zentralverband der Dachdecker) was a trade union representing roofers in Germany.

The union was founded in 1889. It was based in Frankfurt and published the Dachdecker-Zeitung newspaper. It was initially led by Wilhelm Rachwitz, then by Georg Diehl, until his death in 1917, when Theodor Thomas took over. The union affiliated to the General German Trade Union Confederation in 1919, and also to the Building Workers' International.

Membership of the union was only 10,843 in 1928, and in 1931, the union merged into the German Union of Building Trades.

== Presidents ==
1889: Wilhelm Rackwitz
1890s: Georg Diehl
1916: Theodor Thomas
