= Alfred Metzschke =

German trade unionist and politician

Alfred Metzschke (16 November 1857 – 1941) was a German trade unionist and politician.

Born in Leipzig, Metzshcke completed an apprenticeship as a hatter, and in 1886, he joined the German Hat Workers' Union. In 1890, he was elected as the union's president, and also became editor of the union's newspaper, Korrespondent. The union was based in Altenberg, and in 1893, he became the chair of the city's trades council. He supported the formation of the International Union of Hatters, and in 1906 he was elected as its general secretary.

Metzschke was also a member of the Social Democratic Party of Germany (SPD), and in 1890 he became chair of the party in Saxony-Altenburg. In 1910, he was elected to the Parliament of Saxony-Altenburg, in 1919 to the Thuringian People's Council, and in 1921 to the Saxony-Altenburg regional council. He left the last of these positions in 1923, and lived in retirement until his death in 1941.

Trade union offices
Preceded by Hermann Kriemichen	President of the German Hat Workers' Union; 1890–1918	Succeeded by Fritz Siefert
Preceded by Joseph Espanet	General Secretary of the International Union of Hatters; 1906–1921	Succeeded by Ettore Reina
