= Jaap van Achterbergh =

Dutch union leader

Jacob Willem van Achterbergh (15 November 1882 – 15 September 1948) was a Dutch trade union leader.

Born in Amersfoort, Achterbergh was a founding member of the Central Union of Building Workers. In 1920, it merged into the new General Dutch Construction Union, and he became the union's vice president. In 1933, he was elected as the general secretary of the International Federation of Building Workers. He organised a merger which formed the International Federation of Building and Wood Workers (IFBWW), and became its first general secretary.

On the outbreak of World War II, Achterbergh travelled to Copenhagen to safeguard the federation's assets. During the war, he was arrested by the Nazi occupiers, but he survived the war and rebuilt the IFBWW afterwards. He died, still in post, in 1948.

Trade union offices
Preceded by Georg Käppler	General Secretary of the International Federation of Building Workers; 1933–1934	Succeeded by Federation merged
Preceded by New position	General Secretary of the International Federation of Building and Wood Workers; 1934–1948	Succeeded by Jan Leliveld
