= Emil Kloth =

German trade unionist

Emil Kloth (23 October 1864 – 4 May 1942) was a German trade unionist, who later became a Nazi official.

Born in Mecklenburg, Kloth completed an apprenticeship as a bookbinder. As a journeyman, he went to Leipzig, where he became a socialist, and also spent time in Sicily. He then returned to Leipzig, and in 1888 spent time for distributing socialist leaflets, which at the time were illegal.

Kloth joined the Union of Bookbinders and Paper Workers of Germany, and soon came to hold a variety of positions in the union. He also joined the Social Democratic Party of Germany (SPD), and was elected to Leipzig City Council in 1902. He became increasingly critical of the union leadership, which he accused of being too unwilling to take industrial action. In 1904, he was elected as president of the union, defeated Eugen Brückner.

As leader of the union, Kloth moved to Berlin. In 1906, he led the union through a lengthy lockout, which ended in defeat and almost bankrupted the union. Despite this, he was narrowly re-elected as president in 1907. That year, he also played a major role in establishing the International Federation of Bookbinders and Kindred Trades, and became its first general secretary, serving until 1914.

Kloth consistently argued for peace in the run-up to World War I, but once the war started, he supported it. He joined the Lensch-Cunow-Haenisch group, and moved rapidly to a strongly nationalist position. By the end of the war, he was also speaking in antisemitic terms. In 1919, the left wing of the union demanded a vote on the presidency, and moderate SPD members put forward Eugen Haueisen as a candidate. Facing defeat, Kloth instead resigned from the union. Later in the year, he was also expelled from the SPD.

In 1920, Kloth joined the German People's Party, and soon became the secretary of its head office. He was laid off in 1923, while the party was in financial difficulties, and after a period working as a bookbinder, he became editor of Der Deutsche Vorwärts, a right-wing trade union newspaper. In 1924, he joined the German National People's Party (DNVP), and became editor of the party's Berlin newspaper. He argued that the DNVP's trade union wing was too ready to work with SPD members, and this led to him losing his position. He became a freelance writer and moved further to the far right. In 1932, he joined the Nazi Party.

In 1933, the Nazis banned existing trade unions and created new bodies. Kloth was appointed as leader of the student bookbinders' organisation. He left the position in 1935 for unclear reasons, but continued to contribute to the Nazi bookbinders' journal. He then conducted research which attempted to show that trade union leaders had been treasonous during World War I. He died in 1942, of natural causes.

Trade union offices
Preceded by Adam Dietrich	President of the Union of Bookbinders and Paper Workers of Germany; 1904–1919	Succeeded by Eugen Haueisen
Preceded by New position	General Secretary of the International Federation of Bookbinders and Kindred Trades; 1907–1914	Succeeded by Heinrich Hochstrasser
