= International Union of Hotel, Restaurant and Bar Workers =

Former international trade union federation

The International Union of Hotel, Restaurant and Bar Workers (IUHR) was a global union federation bringing together trade unions representing hospitality workers.

== History ==
In the late 19th- and early 20th-century, the Union of German Restaurant Workers was by far the strongest in Europe, and it established branches in many other countries, in cities to which German workers had migrated. In 1908, it organised a conference in Berlin which established the international union, with headquarters in the city.

The secretariat ceased operations during World War I, but was re-established in 1920 at a conference in Amsterdam. Its headquarters were in Amsterdam for four years, before returning to Berlin, then moved to The Hague around the end of the decade. After World War II, it was again re-established, on this occasion based in Stockholm.

In its early years, the IUHR was one of the smaller international trade secretariats. By 1925, it had 13 affiliates, with a total of 57,077 members, but it grew rapidly after World War II, and by 1960 its 15 affiliates had a total of 550,000 members. In 1961, it merged into the International Union of Food, Drink and Tobacco Workers' Associations, which renamed itself as the "International Union of Food, Agricultural, Hotel, Restaurant, Tobacco and Allied Workers' Associations".

== Affiliates ==
In 1960, the following unions were affiliated to the IUHR:

Union	Country	Affiliated membership
Danish Hotel and Restaurant Personnel's Union	Denmark	1,500
Dutch Union of Hotel, Cafe and Restaurant Personnel	Netherlands	5,980
Food, Stimulants, Hotel and Restaurant Workers' Union	West Germany	23,495
Hotel and Restaurant Employees and Bartenders International Union	United States	438,061
Hotel and Restaurant Workers' Union	Austria	13,508
Hotel and Restaurant Workers' Union	Finland	4,493
Hotel and Restaurant Workers' Union	Norway	7,695
Italian Union of Hotel and Restaurant Workers	Italy	Unknown
Skilled Cooks' Union	Denmark	2,544
Swedish Hotel and Restaurant Workers' Union	Sweden	26,085
Union Helvetia	Switzerland	11,468
Union of Commerce, Transport and Food	Switzerland	726
Union of Food and Hotel Workers	Belgium	6,000
Union of Shop, Distributive and Allied Workers	United Kingdom	5,000
Waiters' Union of Denmark	Denmark	6,947

== General Secretaries ==
1908: Albert Baumeister
1912: Hugo Poetzsch
1920: J. G. van Heusden
1924: Rudolf Ströhlinger
1933: P. F. Loncke
1937: Henry Sjöh
