= Union of German Restaurant Workers =

The Union of German Restaurant Workers (German: Verband Deutscher Gastwirtsgehilfen) was a trade union representing workers in hotels and restaurants in Germany.

The first Free Trade Unions of hospitality workers in Germany were established in 1889 and 1890 in Altona, Berlin, Hamburg, Kiel, Leipzig and Magedeburg, and in October 1890, the Berlin Union of Restaurant Workers launched a national journal, Der Gastwirtsgehilfe. In 1894, the various local unions organised a congress in Berlin, which established a national agitation committee. In October 1897, the unions finally agreed to merge to form the "Union of German Restaurant Workers", which was officially established on 1 January 1898. It affiliated to the General Commission of German Trade Unions. It initially had only 915 members, but grew rapidly.

The union soon became the strongest in the industry anywhere in Europe, and it established branches outside the country, in cities to which German workers had migrated. This effort led it to call an international congress in 1908, which formed the International Union of Hotel, Restaurant and Bar Workers, the union providing its headquarters.

In 1919, the union was a founding affiliate of the General German Trade Union Federation, and by 1920, it had 63,243 members. That year, it merged with the Union of Hotel, Restaurant and Cafe Employees and the Union of Chefs, to form the Central Union of Hotel, Restaurant and Cafe Employees.

== Presidents ==
1897: Hugo Poetzsch
1912: Robert Zeiske
