= International Union of Leather Workers =

The International Union of Leather Workers (German: Internationale Union der Lederarbeiter) was a global union federation representing tanners and glovemakers.

The first international links between glovemakers' unions came about in 1871, when the unions from France, Austria, Denmark and Sweden met in Germany, and this led the unions based in Germany and Vienna to begin international co-operation, soon joined by the Scandinavian unions, and one based in Prague. This was sometimes described as the first international trade secretariat, but no central office or leadership was established.

In 1892, at a conference in Brussels, the International Federation of Glovemakers was established. This included affiliates from Germany, Norway and Sweden, and local unions from Brussels, Copenhagen, Genoa, Grenoble, Jáchymov, Kadaň, Luxembourg, Milan, Naples, Paris, Prague and Vienna. However, all combined, they represented only 4,089 workers. Despite this, the federation survived, organising congresses in Grenoble in 1893, Paris in 1895, Zurich in 1898, and Stuttgart in 1904. Its headquarters were initially in Brussels, and from 1892 it published a journal in French, Gantier. In 1904, it moved its headquarters to Berlin, home of its largest affiliate.

In 1914, it decided to admit unions representing tanners, and so renamed itself as the "International Union of Leather Workers". However, it lost most of its affiliates, and by 1921, it only had members from Austria, Denmark, Germany and Luxembourg. That year, it merged into the rival International Union of Boot and Shoe Operatives, Leather, Skin and Hide Workers.

== Presidents ==
Ernst Leister
1904: Johann Eitlinger
1914: Heinrich Mahler
