= German Musicians' Union =

Former German Weimar Republic trade union (1919–1933)

- Deutscher Musiker-Verband
- Successor: Union of Art and Literature (E Germany), Arts Union (W Germany)
- Founded: 1 July 1919
- Dissolved: 2 May 1933
- Location: Germany
- Publication: Deutsche Musiker-Zeitung
- Affiliations: ADGB

The German Musicians' Union (German: Deutscher Musiker-Verband, DeMuV) was a trade union representing musicians in Germany.

The union was founded on 1 July 1919, when the General German Musicians' Union merged with the Central Union of Civilian Musicians in Germany. It affiliated to the General German Trade Union Confederation, and opened an office in Berlin.

The union had about 50,000 members on its formation, but this fell rapidly. It complained that there were too many foreign musicians in the country, "often disreputable persons from other professions who band together in Germany to form so-called Hungarian, jazz, or balalaika ensembles and undercut domestic musicians". By 1931, the union had 23,509 members, and was led by Gottlieb Fauth. It published the Deutsche Musiker-Zeitung newspaper.

In 1933, the union was banned by the Nazi government.
