= Central Union of Stone Workers of Germany =

- Zentralverband der Steinarbeiter Deutschlands
- Successor: Industrial Union of Construction (E Germany); Building and Construction Union (W Germany)
- Founded: 1884
- Dissolved: 2 May 1933
- Headquarters: Zeißer Straße 30/32, Leipzig
- Location: Germany
- Members: 68,033 (1928)
- Publication: Der Steinarbeiter
- Affiliations: ADGB, ISSM

The Central Union of Stone Workers of Germany (German: Zentralverband der Steinarbeiter Deutschlands) was a trade union representing stone masons in Germany.

The union was founded in 1884 in Halle, as the Association of Stonemasons of Germany, as a purely professional organisation. In 1903, it was centralised as the "Central Union of Stone Workers".

From 1919, the union was affiliated to the General German Trade Union Confederation, while internationally, it was affiliated to the International Secretariat of Stone Masons. In 1924, the union absorbed the Union of Stone Setters, Pavers and Kindred Trades.

By 1928, it had 68,033 members, and was based in Leipzig. Leading figures in the union included Paul Stark, Alois Staudinger, and Paul Schencke.

The union was banned in 1933 by the Nazi government. After World War II, stonemasons were represented as part of the Building and Construction Union.

== Presidents ==
1901: Paul Oswald
1902: Paul Starke
1921: Hermann Siebold
