= International Federation of Pottery Workers =

The International Federation of Pottery Workers (IFPW) was a global union federation.

== History ==
The union was founded on the initiative of Fritz Zietsch, editor of Die Ameise, the Germany pottery workers' journal. In 1905, he wrote to unions of pottery workers from around Europe, and those from Germany, Austria, Hungary, France, Italy, Denmark, the Netherlands and the United Kingdom attended the founding meeting of the international in Berlin later in the year. The first triennial congress was held in Limoges in 1906, followed by Florence in 1909 and Hanley in 1912.

The federation's objectives included providing support to affiliates involved in industrial disputes, and improvements in working hours and health and safety.

The federation ceased to operate during World War I, but it was revived after the war, on the initiative of the British and German unions, with a Czech union joining those from France, Austria, Denmark and the Netherlands at its first congress, back in Berlin. The federation operated effectively until 1933, when due to the rise of the Nazis, the German union largely ceased to operate. The federation's headquarters had already been moved to Czechoslovakia, and Ernst Roll was appointed as its acting secretary.

With the French union unable to afford to send representatives to meetings in other countries, and the Austrian union ceasing to operate, in 1935 the International Federation of Trade Unions took action. The IFPW was merged into the International Federation of General Factory Workers. Initially, it continued to act as a distinct section, holding a conference in Hanley in 1937, with each delegate given a musical mug. Two years later, the Dutch, Danish, Norwegian and Swedish unions attempted to reform the IFPW, but World War II started before anything concrete happened.

== General Secretaries ==
1905: Fritz Zietsch
1913: Georg Wollmann
1933: Ernst Roll
