= Wilhelmine Kähler =

German activist and politician (1864–1941)

Kähler in 1919

Wilhelmine Kähler (née Mohs or Moss, 3 April 1864 – 22 February 1941) was a German labour and women's rights activist, and politician.

== Activism and politics ==
From 1890, Kähler was part of the labour movement. She co-founded and led the Verband der Fabrik- und Handarbeiterinnen, making her the only woman to lead a trade union in Germany during the 1890s. She sat on the General Commission of German Trade Unions. Her union became part of the Union of Domestic Workers of Germany, and she was acting president of that union in 1913.

Around 1900 Kähler lived in Dresden, where she primarily worked on improving the situation of working women.

Kähler wrote for the social democratic women's magazine Die Gleichheit and the Düsseldorf newspaper Volkszeitung starting in 1906. She was an editor of Für unsere Frauen, a women's movement correspondence, the yearbook Der Frauenhausschatz.

From 1919 until 1923 Kähler worked as a civil servant for the Reich Ministry of Economy. In 1919 she also became a member of the Weimar National Assembly, which drafted the Weimar Constitution. She was subsequently a member of the Reichstag until 1921, and then a member of the Landtag of Prussia until 1924. Kähler represented the Social Democratic Party of Germany (SPD/MSPD).

After 1926 she led a local Arbeiterwohlfahrt organisation in her home town of Kellinghusen until 1931.

== Personal life ==
Kähler was born in 1864 in Kellinghusen, where she also went to school. She was a seamstress and a housekeeper. In 1882 she married her first husband who was a cigar factory worker.

Kähler later remarried in 1924 and moved to Bonn with her husband in 1931, retiring from political activism. She died in Bonn in 1941.
