= Union of Coppersmiths of Germany =

- Verband der Kupferschmiede Deutschlands
- Successor: Industrial Union of Metal (E Germany), Industrial Union of Metal (W Germany)
- Founded: 1 July 1887
- Dissolved: 2 May 1933
- Location: Germany
- Affiliations: ADGB

The Union of Coppersmiths of Germany (German: Verband der Kupferschmiede Deutschlands) was a trade union representing coppersmiths in Germany.

The union was established on 1 July 1886, by 760 workers. In 1919, it was a founding affiliate of the General German Trade Union Confederation. It spread across Germany and Danzig, and by the start of the 1930s, it had 98 districts, grouped in 9 regions. However, it remained small, with 7,024 members in 1928. Leaders of the union were Julius Saupe, Max Hecht, and then Otto Jahrmarkt. Internationally, it was part of the International Metalworkers' Federation.

In 1933, the union was banned by the Nazis. After World War II, coppersmiths were represented by the IG Metall union.
