= German Textile Workers' Union =

Former German Reich trade union (1891–1933)

- Deutscher Textilarbeiterverband
- Successor: Industrial Union of Textiles (E Germany), Textile and Clothing Union (W Germany)
- Founded: 29 May 1891
- Dissolved: May 2, 1933
- Headquarters: 8/9 Memeler Straße, Berlin
- Location: Germany
- Members: 704,000 (1922)
- Publication: Der Textilarbeiter
- Affiliations: ADGB, IFTWA

The German Textile Workers' Union (German: Deutscher Textilarbeiterverband, DTAV) was a trade union representing workers in the textile industry in Germany.

The union was founded in 1891, at a conference in Pößneck, which brought together various local unions. In its early years, the appropriate degree of centralisation was highly controversial, but a centralised organisation gradually emerged. The union acquired the Textilarbeiter newspaper, and made it the official journal. By 1900, the union had 42,742 members, but it then increased its membership fees, and membership dropped back to 27,548.

In 1903 and 1904, the union led the Crimmitschauer Strike, in support of a maximum ten-hour working day. This severely strained the union's finances and ultimately proved unsuccessful, but it led to a rapid increase in membership. From 1905, the union set up a regional structure, with each region led by a full-time organiser.

Until the end of World War I, the union had a reputation for being very moderate, but a majority of the union supported the German Revolution of 1918–1919. It was a founding affiliate of the General German Trade Union Confederation in 1919.

Membership peaked at 704,000 in 1922, but the Great Depression led to high unemployment in the textile industry, and union membership fell rapidly. By 1928, it had fallen to 310,941, of whom, 179,767 were women, a very high proportion for the time. Membership density was not as strong as other sectors, as Christian trade unions recruited well in the industry.

By 1932, membership was down to 220,000. The union was banned by the Nazi government in 1933, and after World War II, workers in the sector were represented by the Textile and Clothing Union.

== Presidents ==
1891: Carl Hübsch
1919: Carl Hübsch and Hermann Jäckel
1921: Carl Hübsch, Hermann Jäckel and Karl Schrader
1927: Hermann Jäckel and Karl Schrader
1928: Karl Schrader
