= Adolph Schönfelder =

German politician

Second Mayor of the Free and Hanseatic city of Hamburg
- In office 1945–1946
- Preceded by: –
- Succeeded by: Christian Koch

Father of the House of the Parlamentarischer Rat
- In office 1948–1949

Personal details
- Born: 1875 Hamburg
- Died: 1966 (aged 90–91) Hamburg
- Party: Social Democratic Party of Germany

Heinrich Ferdinand Adolph Schönfelder (1875–1966) was a German politician, Alterspräsident (President by right of age, Father of the House) of the Federal German parliamentary council in 1948–49, Senator and Second Mayor of Hamburg, as well as member of the Hamburg Parliament. Schönfelder was a member of the Social Democratic Party.

From 1921 to 1925, Schönfelder was the president of the Central Union of Carpenters and Kindred Trades of Germany.

On 1 September 1948 in his position of Alterspräsident, Schönfelder presided over the first meeting of the Parliamentary Council that drafted the Basic Law for the Federal Republic of Germany. As presiding officer of the constitutive meeting of the parliamentary council, he chaired the election of the council's President and two Vice-Presidents. He was chosen first vice-president of the council.

On 23 May 1949, as first vice-president of the parliamentary council, he signed the Basic Law for the Federal Republic of Germany together with Konrad Adenauer and Hermann Schäfer.

Schönfelder was honorary citizen of Hamburg, the highest decoration of the city-state.

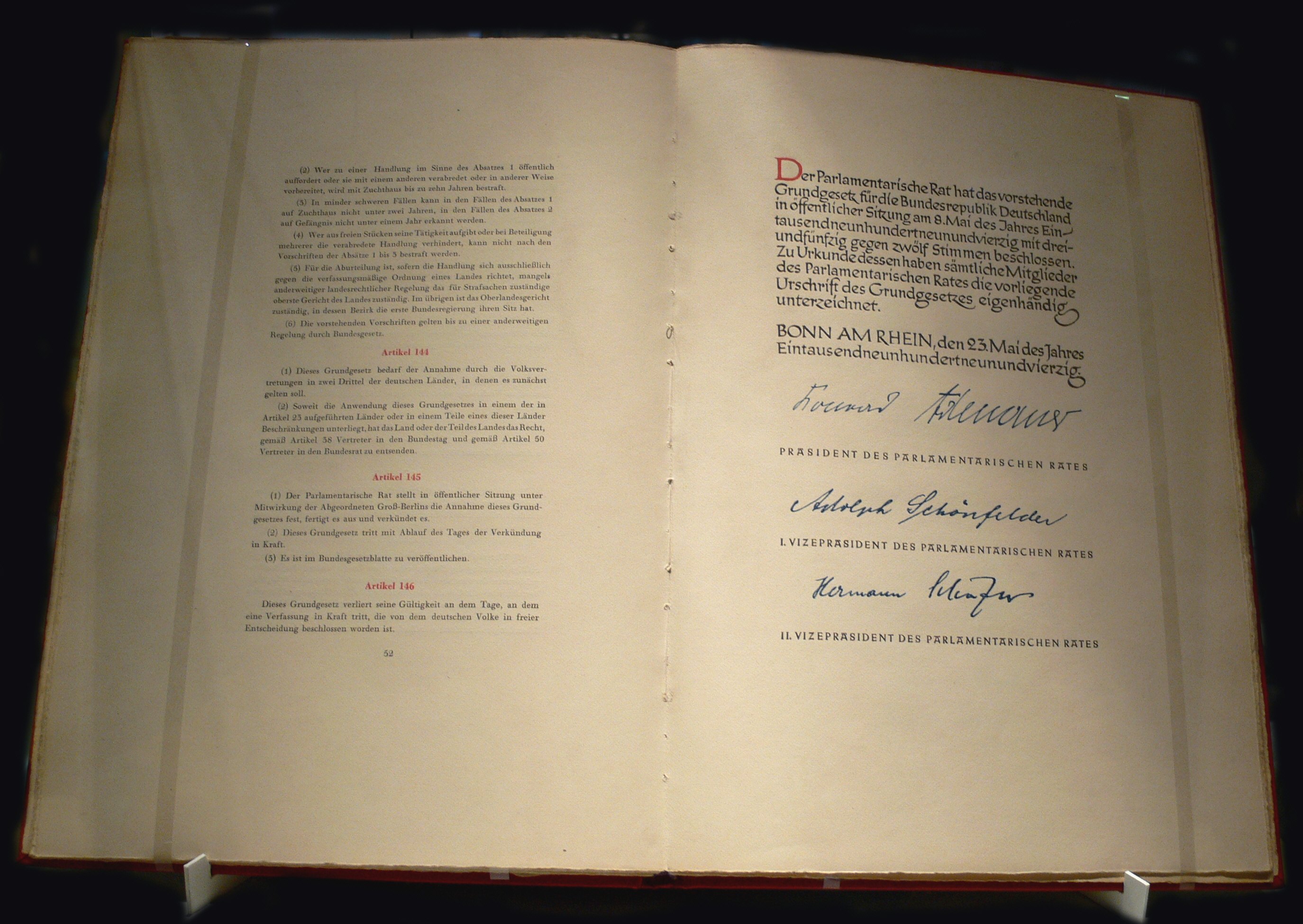
Basic Law for The Federal Republic of Germany 1949, facsimile of the signatures of Konrad Adenauer (CDU), Adolph Schönfelder (SPD) and Hermann Schäfer (FDP) certifying the original

== See also ==
- List of mayors of Hamburg

Trade union offices
Preceded by Friedrich Schrader	President of the Central Union of Carpenters and Kindred Trades of Germany; 1921–1925	Succeeded by Wilhelm Wolgast
