= German Hat Workers' Union =

Former German Reich trade union (1872–1933)

- Deutscher Hutarbeiter-Verband
- Successor: Industrial Union of Clothing (E Germany), Textile and Clothing Union (W Germany)
- Founded: 1 January 1872
- Dissolved: May 1933
- Headquarters: 65 Wallstraße, Berlin
- Location: Germany
- Members: 18,509 (1928)
- Publication: Der Deutsche Hutarbeiter
- Affiliations: ADGB, IUH

The German Hat Workers' Union (German: Deutscher Hutarbeiter-Verband, DHAV) was a trade union representing hatters in Germany.

The union was founded on 16 July 1871, although it later gave its official founding date as 1 January 1872. Initially, it was named the Central Union of German Hatters, and was based in Offenbach am Main. Membership was initially 1,165, and grew to 2,667 by 1879. That year, the union was banned under the Anti-Socialist Laws, but the union leaders formed the Hatter's Health and Death Fund to carry on its work, and when the Anti-Socialist Laws were repealed, the union was re-established, as the "German Hat Workers' Union".

The union was a founding constituent of the General German Trade Union Confederation in 1919, and by 1928, it had 18,509 members. It was banned by the Nazis in 1933. After World War II, hatters were instead represented by the Textile and Clothing Union.

== Presidents ==
1876: Hermann Kriemichen
1890: Alfred Metzschke
1918: Fritz Siefert
1922: Franz Brösicke
