= German Union of Saddlers, Upholsterers and Portfolio Makers =

Former German Weimar Republic trade union (1920–1933)

- Deutscher Sattler-, Tapezierer- und Portefeuiller-Verband
- Predecessor: Union of Saddlers and Portfolio Makers; Union of Upholsterers of Germany
- Successor: Industrial Union of Leather (E Germany), Leather Union (W Germany)
- Founded: 2 April 1920
- Dissolved: 2 May 1933
- Headquarters: Michaelkirchstraße 14, Berlin
- Location: Germany
- Members: 31,406 (1928)
- Publication: Sattler-, Tapezierer- und Portefeuillerzeitung
- Affiliations: ADGB, IFBSOLW, IFWW

The German Union of Saddlers, Upholsterers and Portfolio Makers (German: Deutscher Sattler-, Tapezierer- und Portefeuiller-Verband) was a trade union representing leather goods and upholstery workers in Germany.

The union was established in 1920, when the Union of Saddlers and Portfolio Makers merged with the Union of Upholsterers and Kindred Trades of Germany. The union was based in Berlin and, like its predecessors, it affiliated to the General German Trade Union Confederation. It initially had 28,281 members, and by 1928, this had grown slightly, to 31,406. These figures disguised a high level of turnover, as more than half the union's members were under 30 years old.

The union was banned by the Nazi government in 1933. After World War II, leather workers were represented by the Leather Union.

== Presidents ==
1920: Peter Blum
1929: Friedrich Gerhardt
