= Standing Committee of Trade Unions in the Graphic Industry =

Trade union federation

The Standing Committee of Trade Unions in the Graphic Industry, also known as the Permanent Committee Graphic Arts Unions, was an international trade union federation for workers in the graphic arts industry.

== History ==
The organization was founded in 1961.

== Organization and members ==
In 1985, there were ten affiliate members of the committee.

The group's 5th International Consultative Conference at Budapest was attended by 65 organizations from 58 countries and four international groups.

While it maintained a close relationship with the World Federation of Trade Unions since its foundation, it was never an official affiliate. It also cooperated with the International Graphic Federation (an international trade secretariat of the rival International Confederation of Free Trade Unions) as well as with national organizations of workers in the graphic arts industry regardless of affiliation.

Its headquarters, under the name Permanent Committee Graphic Arts Unions, was reported to be at Opletalova 57 Prague 1, Czechoslovakia. In 1985 its headquarters was recorded as being at 15 Unter der Linden Berlin 108, East Germany.

== Publications ==
It published a news bulletin which appeared ten times a year.

== Presidents ==
1967: Heinz Oehler
1970: Heinz Deckert
1986: Werner Peplowski
