= Central Union of Carpenters and Kindred Trades of Germany =

Former German Reich trade union (1883–1933)

- Zentralverband der Zimmerer und verwandter Berufsgenossen Deutschlands
- Successor: Industrial Union of Wood (E Germany), Wood and Plastic Union (W Germany)
- Founded: July 1883
- Dissolved: 2 May 1933
- Headquarters: 57 Besenbinderhof, Hamburg
- Location: Germany
- Members: 103,678 (1930)
- Publication: Der Zimmerer
- Affiliations: ADGB, ZI

The Central Union of Carpenters and Kindred Trades of Germany (German: Zentralverband der Zimmerer und verwandter Berufsgenossen Deutschlands) was a trade union representing carpenters in Germany.

The union was established in 1883 in Berlin, as the Union of German Carpenters, with 2,232 members. Its headquarters moved to Hamburg in 1887, and with the end of the Anti-Socialist Laws in 1890, it was joined by the Free Alliance of German Carpenters. In 1893, August Bringmann, former secretary of the Free Alliance, became the first editor of the union's journal, Der Zimmerer.

The union adopted its final name in 1897. Its membership grew steadily, reaching 24,149 by 1900, 59,831 in 1913, and 87,024 in 1920. In 1903, it was the principal founder of the Carpenters' International, and provided the leadership throughout its existence. In 1919, it was a founding affiliate of the General German Trade Union Confederation.

By 1930, the union had 103,678 members. In addition to Der Zimmerer, it published Der Jung-Zimmerman for apprentices, and Der Zimmerpolier for French polishers. In 1933, it was banned by the Nazi government.

== Presidents ==
1890: Friedrich Schrader
1921: Adolph Schönfelder
1926: Wilhelm Wolgast
