= Association of Graphic Workers of Yugoslavia =

Yugoslav trade union

The Association of Graphic Workers of Yugoslavia (Serbo-Croatian: Savez grafičkih radnika Jugoslavije, SGRJ) was a trade union representing workers in the printing industry in Yugoslavia.

The union was established in December 1920, bringing together various local unions, of which the most important was the Croatian Typographic Society, founded in 1870. As a result, the union was based in Zagreb. The union was almost immediately banned, but was legalised in September 1921, after it promised not to permit communists to hold leadership positions.

In 1933, the union was reorganised as an umbrella body for five national bodies. As of 1935, the Serbian body alone had around 2,000 members. The union was banned in 1941.
