= German Painters' Union =

Former German Reich trade union (1885–1933)

Union of Painters, Decorators, Whitewashers, Plasterers, and House Painters of Germany
- Vereinigung der Maler, Lackierer, Anstreicher und verwandten Berufsgenossen Deutschlands
- Successor: Industrial Union of Construction (E Germany), Building and Construction Union (W Germany)
- Founded: December 1884
- Dissolved: 2 May 1933
- Location: Germany
- Affiliations: ADGB

The Union of Painters, Decorators, Whitewashers, Plasterers, and House Painters of Germany (German: Verband der Maler, Lackierer, Anstreicher, Tüncher und Weissbinder Deutschlands) was a trade union representing painters in Germany.

The union was founded in 1885, bringing together various local unions. It grew slowly, reaching 22,651 members in 1904, and 42,000 in 1916. In 1919, it was a founding member of the General German Trade Union Confederation. By 1928, it had 58,775 members. In 1933, it was banned by the Nazi government.

== Presidents ==
1890s: Albert Tobler
1914: Otto Streine
1928: Hans Batz
