= Free Trade Unions (Poland) =

Free Union of Poland (German: Freie Gewerkschaften) were German trade unions in Poland, based in the former Prussian territories that were ceded to Poland. The unions were linked to the German Socialist Labour Party in Poland (DSAP). As of 1925, the unions had 13,200 members.

== See also ==
- Free Trade Unions (Germany)
