= Union of German Book Printers =

Voluntary association

- Verband der Deutschen Buchdrucker
- Successor: Industrial Union of Printing and Paper (E Germany), Printing and Paper Union (W Germany)
- Founded: May 1866
- Dissolved: 2 May 1933
- Headquarters: Dreibundstraße 5, Berlin
- Location: Germany
- Members: 82,767 (1928)
- Publication: Korrespondent für Deutschlands Buchdrucker und Schriftgießer
- Affiliations: ADGB, ITS

The Union of German Book Printers (German: Verband der Deutschen Buchdrucker, VDDB) was a trade union representing printers in Germany.

The Threepenny Strike took place in Leipzig in 1865, with printers striking for higher pay. The action was partially successful, and inspired other strikes across the country. In May 1866, a German Book Printers' Day was held in Leipzig, and this founded the national union, which adopted the newspaper Der Correspondent as its journal.

In order to avoid being banned under the Anti-Socialist Laws, in 1879 it renamed itself as the German Book Printers' Support Club, and it moved its funds to Switzerland. This enabled it to become the first German union to offer a national unemployment insurance scheme, in 1880. From 1888, the union was based in Berlin. In 1890, the Anti-Socialist Laws were repealed, and so in 1893, the union reverted to the name, "Union of Book Printers".

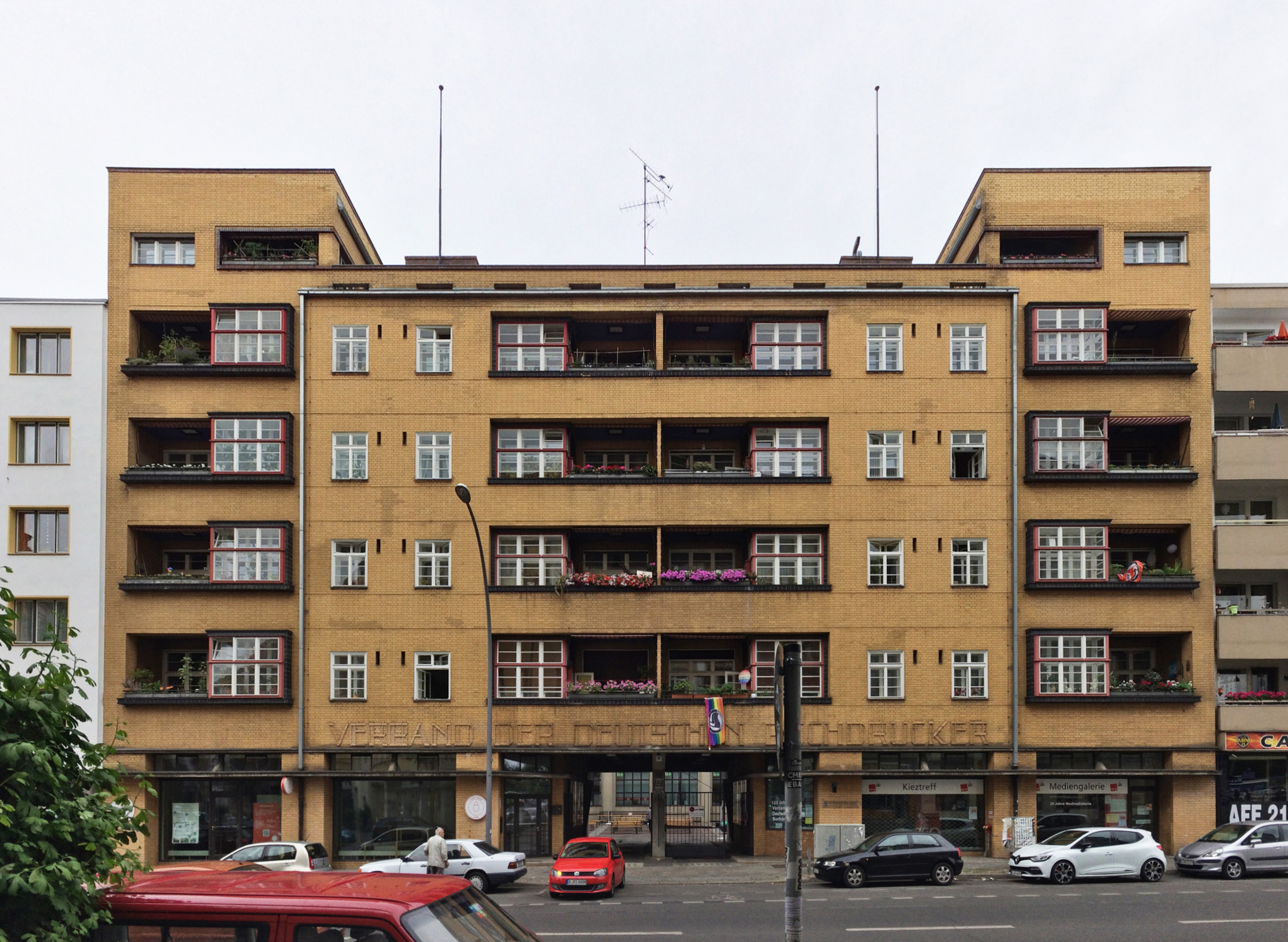
Former headquarters of the union

In 1919, the union became a founding affiliate of the General German Trade Union Confederation. Within the federation, it was part of the Graphic Block. By 1928, it had 82,767 members. It was banned by the Nazi government in 1933. After World War II, printers were represented as part of the Printing and Paper Union.

== Presidents ==
1866: Berthold Feistel
1867: Richard Härtel
1879: Johannes Didolph
1880: Franz Sulz
1888: Emil Döblin
1918: Joseph Seitz
1928: Otto Krautz
