= Free Trade Unions (Germany) =

The Free Trade Unions (German: Freie Gewerkschaften; sometimes also translated as Free Labor Unions or Free Labour Unions) comprised the socialist trade union movement in Germany from 1890 to 1933. The term distinguished them from the liberal ("yellow") and Christian labor unions in Germany. Coordinated by the General Commission of German Trade Unions until 1919 and later by the General German Trade Union Federation, the Free Trade Unions consisted of forty-six individual labor organizations with a total of 2.5 million members as of 1914. The term "free" was to note that these unions were independent worker organizations. The liberal ("yellow") unions were considered to be controlled by management and the "Christian" trade unions by the Catholic Church.

Later, the term "free trade unions" also indicated those that were not fronts for the Communist Party.

== See also ==
- Free Trade Unions (Poland)
