= Factory Workers' Union of Germany =

Former German Reich trade union (1890–1933)

- Fabrikarbeiterverband
- Successor: Industrial Union of Chemicals, Glass and Ceramics (E Germany); Chemical, Paper and Ceramic Union (W Germany)
- Founded: July 1890
- Dissolved: May 2, 1933
- Headquarters: 3 Rathenau-Platz, Hannover
- Location: Germany
- Members: 720,000 (1922)
- Publication: Der Proletarier
- Affiliations: ADGB, IFF

The Factory Workers' Union of Germany (Verband der Fabrikarbeiter Deutschlands, VFD, commonly known as Fabrikarbeiterverband, FAV) was a trade union in Germany.

== History ==
The union was founded in early July 1890, as a general union affiliated to the General Commission of German Trade Unions, gathering unskilled workers from many different industrial sectors. It was initially named the Union of Factory, Agricultural and Commercial Support Workers in Germany It grew rapidly, with 11,000 members by 1896, and 76,000 by 1905. However, in 1906, it decided to only represent workers in six industries:

- Chemical industry
- Paper making
- Brick making
- Sugar refining
- Agriculture
- Dairies, distilleries and related trades

In light of this, in 1908, it changed its name to the "Factory Workers' Union of Germany", and by 1912, it had come to focus on the chemical, paper, building materials, and food industries. This strategy proved successful, and by 1913 the membership had reached 210,000. That year, the Union of Flower Workers joined, while the Union of Wallpaper, Oilcloth and Linoleum Printers joined in 1919.

In 1919, the union was a founding affiliate of the General German Trade Union Confederation, and in 1922 its membership peaked at 720,000. It declined during the Great Depression, and by 1932, it had around 350,000 members. This was despite merging with the Central Union of Glassworkers and the Union of Porcelain and Related Workers of Germany, in 1926.

By 1929, the union had seven sections:

Section	Members
Chemical Industry	130,122
Paper Industry	86,189
Food Industry	40,024
Toy, Artificial Flowers and Feather Industry	8,021
Fine Ceramics	50,602
Clay and Building Materials	109,793
Miscellaneous Industries	18,238

FAV published the weekly newspaper Der Proletarier. In April 1933, the Nazi government replaced its leadership with a Nazi commissioner, and the union was forcibly dissolved on 2 May 1933. After World War II, workers in the relevant sectors were represented by the Chemical, Paper and Ceramic Union.

== Presidents ==
1890: August Brey
1931: Karl Thiemig
