= Industrial Union of Printing and Paper =

Former East German trade union (1946–1990)

The Industrial Union of Printing and Paper (German: Industriegewerkschaft Druck und Papier, IG DuP) was a trade union representing workers in the printing industry in East Germany.

== History ==
The union was founded in June 1946 by the new Free German Trade Union Federation (FDGB) as the Industrial Union of Graphic Arts and Paper Processing, with 49,475 members. In 1950, it was renamed as the "Industrial Union of Printing and Paper".

Internationally, the union was affiliated to the Standing Committee of Trade Unions in the Graphic Industry, hosting its headquarters and providing its president. The union became involved in sports associations, their names starting with "SV Rotation".

== Growth ==
The union grew steadily, and by 1989, it had 152,408 members. In March 1990 it became independent, and on 30 September, it dissolved. Members were recommended to join the Media Union, although those in paper production instead joined the Chemical, Paper and Ceramic Union, and some small groups joined other unions.

== Presidents ==
1946: Otto Krautz
1949: Willi Grapentin
1951: Heinz Meier
1961: Heinz Oehler
1966: Heinz Deckert
1985: Werner Peplowski

== See also ==
- Printing and Kindred Industries Union
