= International Federation of Building Workers =

The International Federation of Building Workers (IFBW) was a global union federation bringing together unions representing masons.

== History ==
The German Central Union of Masons gradually built up international contacts in the late 19th-century. In 1903, it called a conference in Berlin, to formalise these relationships by establishing an international trade federation.

The federation was established as the Building Workers' International, and was based in Hamburg from its foundation. By 1925, most of its member unions had merged with the carpenters' unions in their country, and so it agreed to absorb the Carpenters' International. This gave it 26 affiliates, with a total of 756,059 members.

On 1 April 1934, the federation merged with the International Federation of Wood Workers, to form the International Federation of Building and Wood Workers.

== Affiliates ==
The following unions were affiliated as of 1922:

Union	Country	Membership
Central Association of Construction Workers	Austria	87,154
General Union of Building, Furnishing and Other Industries	Belgium	42,065
	Czechoslovakia	42,413
	Denmark	5,074
	Finland	1,331
National Federation of Construction Workers	France	6,353
German Construction Workers' Union	Germany	588,271
	Hungary	23,249
	Italy	60,000
	Luxembourg	1,105
General Dutch Construction Union	Netherlands	9,061
Norwegian Union of Building Workers	Norway	2,278
	Poland	9,975
	Romania	2,390
	Sweden	3,999
Swiss Construction Workers' Union	Switzerland	3,825
National Federation of Building Trades Operatives	United Kingdom	253,000
General Workers' Union of Yugoslavia	Yugoslavia	608

== General Secretaries ==
1903: Theodor Bömelburg
1913: Fritz Paeplow
1919: Georg Käppler
1933: Jaap van Achterbergh

=== Presidents ===
1919: Fritz Paeplow
1927:
1933: Nikolaus Bernhard
