= Fritz Tarnow =

German politician

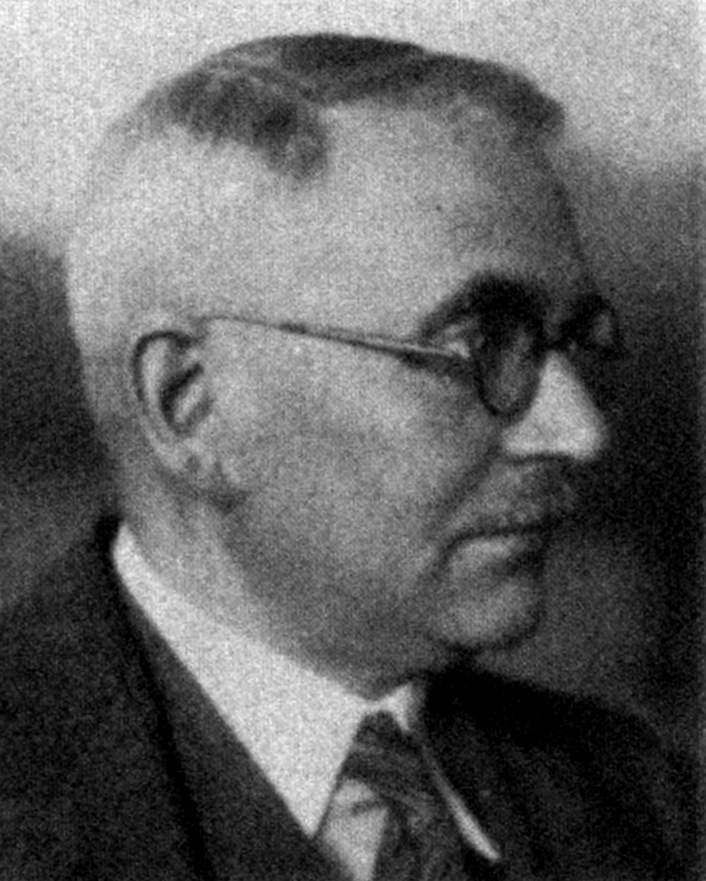
- Tarnow's official Reichstag portrait, 1932

Member of the Reichstag
- In office 1928–1933

Personal details
- Born: 13 April 1880 Bad Oeynhausen, Province of Westphalia, German Empire
- Died: 23 October 1951 (aged 71)
- Party: SPD

Fritz Tarnow (April 13, 1880 in Bad Oeynhausen, Province of Westphalia – October 23, 1951) was a Social Democrat trade unionist and Reichstag deputy during the Weimar Republic.

== Life ==
Tarnow was the son of a carpenter and attended elementary school in Hanover, where he also became a carpenter's apprentice. He then became a journeyman and traveled throughout Germany. He worked until 1906 as a carpenter, and in the years 1901 to 1906, he was also a board member of the Rastatt, Oos, Bonn and Berlin branches of the Deutscher Holzarbeiterverband. Then he worked until 1908 as a literary and statistical assistant in the main office of the Wood Workers Association in Stuttgart. In 1909, he graduated from the central school of the Social Democratic Party (SPD) in Berlin. From 1909 to 1919, Tarnow was then head of the Literary Agents (Press Office) in the main office of the German Wood Workers' Union, in Berlin. In addition, from 1909 to 1915, he was a community representative, a member of the district assembly and a board member of the SPD in Berlin-Friedrichshagen.

Tarnow fought in the First World War and was severely wounded, causing lasting injury. During the November Revolution of 1918, Tarnow was a member of the Workers and Soldiers Council in Brandenburg an der Havel. He became secretary of the Wood Workers Association, later serving as chairman from 1920 to 1933. He was one of the leading figures in the national executive of the Allgemeiner Deutscher Gewerkschaftsbund, a German trade union confederation. In the latter half of the 1920s, he was one of the main proponents of Fritz Naphtali's concept of economic democracy. He was briefly secretary of the International Woodworkers Association. In addition, from 1920 to 1933, he was a member of the provisional Reichswirtschaftsrat. He was also the leader of the Society for Social Reform and German Werkbund. In 1928, he joined the Reichstag as a member for the SPD. During the Great Depression he advocated, alongside Vladimir S. Voitinsky, a proto-Keynesian public works program dubbed the WTB plan.

After Adolf Hitler's rise to power in early 1933 and the dismantling of the trade unions, Tarnow was arrested on 2 May. Hans Staudinger, who had been a State Secretary in the Prussian Ministry of Trade until the Preußenschlag, succeeded in obtaining Tarnow's release from Gestapo custody. Staudinger impersonated a senior Prussian officer and ordered Tarnow's release. After his release, he immediately left the country, and fled first to the Netherlands, then Denmark and finally, Sweden. There, he tried to rebuild the trade unions in exile.

He returned to West Germany in 1946 and was the secretary of the Württemberg and Baden Trade Union Confederation in 1946 and 1947. From 1947 to 1949, he was secretary of the union council of Bizone and then the Trizone. He retired in 1949, but continued as a lecturer at the Academy of work in Frankfurt.

== Bibliography ==
- William Heinz Schroeder: Social Democratic parliamentarians in the German Reich and country days 1867 - 1933. Biographies, Chronicle and electoral documentation. A Manual. Düsseldorf, 1995. ISBN 3-7700-5192-0 S.764f.

Trade union offices
Preceded by Karl Kloß and Theodor Leipart	President of the German Wood Workers' Union; 1920–1933; With: Theodor Leipart (1908–1919); Adam Neumann (1919–1933)	Succeeded by Union banned
Preceded by Kees Woudenberg	General Secretary of the International Federation of Woodworkers; 1929–1933	Succeeded by Willem Hauwaert
