= International Confederation of Musicians =

The International Confederation of Musicians (ICM) was a global union federation bringing together trade unions representing musicians.

The confederation was established on 11 May 1904, at a conference in Paris. After World War I, it affiliated to the International Federation of Trade Unions. By 1922, its affiliates had a total of 52,550 members, but it appears to have dissolved soon afterwards. After World War II, a new International Federation of Musicians was established.

== Affiliates ==
In 1922, the following unions were affiliated:

Union	Country	Membership
	Austria	7,000
Federation of Musical Artists	Belgium	6,000
	Czechoslovakia	3,000
	Greece	250
	Hungary	2,500
	Italy	7,500
Dutch Musical Artists' Union	Netherlands	2,000
	Portugal	?
	South Africa	?
	Spain	6,000
Swiss Musicians' Union	Switzerland	800
Musicians' Union	United Kingdom	18,000
