= International Agitation Commission of Carvers =

The International Agitation Commission of Carvers (German: Internationale Agitationskommission der Bildhauer) was a global union federation representing people involved in carving wood for the construction industry.

The first international conference of carvers was held on 5 June 1895 in Nuremberg. It was attended by representatives of unions from Germany, Austria, Hungary, Bohemia, the Netherlands, and Switzerland, while a French union sent a letter of support. The meeting resolves to campaign for a maximum eight-hour working day, for the abolition of piecework, and for each union to establish a fund to support industrial action. However, the unions decided against financially supporting each others' strike action, except in extreme circumstances.

The Hungarian union proposed a system whereby representatives would be elected in each workplace, who would elect local committees, which in turn would elect national committees, who would select the members of a new international federation. This was voted down, as being too bureaucratic, and the proposal of the Central Union of Carvers of Germany was accepted, to have an international bureau it would host in Berlin, funded by correspondence commissions in each country, their fees in proportion to the number of members they represented.

An international commission was established, led by Paul Dupont. It was unable to achieve much, hampered in particular by low membership in Switzerland, and disagreements with the French union, which did not join. In 1919, the German union merged into the German Wood Workers' Union, and the international commission similarly merged into the International Federation of Woodworkers.
