= Lawrence Barchue =

Maritime consultant

- Born: April 9, 1958 (age 68); Harper, Liberia
- Citizenship: Liberian
- Education: Maine Maritime Academy (BSc), World Maritime University (MSc)
- Occupations: Maritime consultant, former public servant

Lawrence Dehniah Barchue, Sr. (born April 9, 1958) is a maritime consultant. He has previously served in several senior positions at the International Maritime Organization (IMO), including Assistant Secretary-General.

== Early life and education ==
Barchue was born in Harper, Liberia, to Joseph Gargar Thomson Barchue and Esther Mardea Thomson Barchue. He completed his secondary education at the College of West Africa in Monrovia, Liberia.

In 1982, he received a bachelor of science with honors in marine engineering from Maine Maritime Academy in Castine, Maine, USA, with a minor in marine industrial management. During his time there, he was listed in Who's Who Among Students in American Universities and Colleges (1981–1982).

In 1991, Barchue acquired a master of science in maritime education and training (engineering) from the World Maritime University (WMU) in Malmö, Sweden, with a focus on education and marine engineering training.

== Career ==
=== Early career ===
Barchue began his career in the 1980s, serving as an marine engineer officer on tankers operated by Gulf Oil Corporation and Marathon International Petroleum. During this period, he acquired his Chief Engineer's license. Subsequently, he held the position of adjunct lecturer at the Marine Training Institute in Liberia and served as an advisor on international affairs to the Liberian Seamen, Ports, and General Workers Union.

=== Representation of Liberia ===
From 1992 to February 2002, Barchue served as Deputy Permanent Representative of the Republic of Liberia to the International Maritime Organization (IMO) and as Counsellor (Maritime Affairs) at the Embassy of Liberia in London, United Kingdom. In these roles, he represented Liberia at various meetings of the IMO, including the Assembly, Council, Committees, Sub-Committees, and Diplomatic Conferences. He also represented Liberia at the International Mobile Satellite Organization (Inmarsat), the International Labour Organization, and the International Telecommunication Union on matters related to shipping. Between 1996 and 2002, he chaired the Facilitation Committee of the IMO and led several working groups at meetings convened by intergovernmental organizations.

=== International Maritime Organization ===
In March 2002, Barchue joined the Secretariat of the International Maritime Organization (IMO). He initially worked as Head of the Technical Cooperation Implementation and Project Management Section within the Maritime Safety Division, a position he held until December 2003. From January 2004 to June 2010, he served as Deputy Director and Head of Member State Audit and Internal Oversight in the Office of the Secretary-General, and later as Senior Deputy Director from July 2010 to December 2011. In January 2012, he became Head of the Department for Member State Audit and Implementation Support in the Maritime Safety Division, serving until August 2014. He then served as Director of the department from September 2014 to July 2017, and as Assistant Secretary-General/Director from July 2017 to April 2021.

During his tenure, Barchue was involved in the development and implementation of the IMO Member State Audit Scheme (IMSAS), a program designed to assess member states' compliance with obligations under international maritime conventions. The scheme reviews national legal, administrative, and technical frameworks relating to maritime safety, environmental protection, and related port and coastal state responsibilities. Its implementation involved coordination with a network of maritime experts from various fields, including law, engineering, and naval operations.

Since leaving the IMO in 2021, Barchue has worked as an independent international maritime consultant.

== Academic contributions and publications ==
Barchue has delivered lectures at the IMO International Maritime Law Institute in Valletta, Malta, and at the World Maritime University in Malmö, Sweden, on topics related to compliance and regulatory frameworks in maritime governance.

He wrote the chapter "The IMO, the Audit Scheme, and the Role in Global Governance" in Volume III: The IMO and Global Governance, published by Oxford Scholarly Authorities on International Law. He also contributed the chapter titled "A Cooperative Compliance Strategy: The Voluntary IMO Member State Audit Scheme" to the proceedings of the Hamburg International Environmental Law Conference 2011, later included in the publication Climate Change and Environmental Hazards Related to Shipping: An International Legal Framework. In April 2009, his article "The Voluntary IMO Member State Audit Scheme: An Accountability Regime for States on Maritime Affairs" was published in the WMU Journal of Maritime Affairs.

== Sports ==
Between 1978 and 1981, Barchue played men's soccer for Maine Maritime Academy. He scored 33 goals and recording 22 assists, totalling 88 career points, ranking him third in the program's all-time points list. In the 1980 season, he scored 14 goals, which is among the highest single season totals in the program's history. He was part of the 1978 team that reached the NAIA National Tournament and teams that won New England Collegiate Conference championships in 1978 and 1980. He was named an NECC All-Star in 1979, 1980, and 1981, and served as team captain in 1981-1982. In 2019, he was inducted into the Maine Maritime Academy Athletics Hall of Fame.

== Personal life ==
Barchue is married to Barbara Barchue. They have two sons, Lawrence Jr. and Trocon Anders.
