= International Arts and Entertainment Alliance =

Global trade union federation

- Founded: 1997
- Location: International
- Key people: Gerry Morrissey, president Benoît Machuel, secretary
- Affiliations: Council of Global Unions
- Website: www.iaea-globalunion.org

The International Arts and Entertainment Alliance (IAEA) is a global union federation (GUF) representing trade unions of performers and technicians in the music and audiovisual sectors.

The alliance has three sections: the International Federation of Actors (FIA), the International Federation of Musicians (FIM), and the Media, Entertainment and Arts section of the UNI Global Union (UNI-MEI). Trade unions affiliate to the appropriate section; 90 unions hold membership of the International Federation of Actors, and 70 unions hold membership of the International Federation of Musicians.

In 2007, the alliance joined the Council of Global Unions.
