= Voitinsky =

Voitinsky, Voytinsky, Voytinskiy or Voitinskiy (Cyrillic: Войтинский) is a Russian masculine surname; its feminine counterpart is Voitinskaya or Voytinskaya. It may refer to the following notable people:

- Aleksandr Voytinskiy (born 1961), Russian film director, screenwriter and producer
- Grigori Voitinsky (1893–1953), Soviet government official
- Vladimir Bogomolov (born Vladimir Voitinsky, 1924–2003), Russian writer
- Vladimir Voitinsky (1885–1960), Russian revolutionary, politician and economist
