= Legien =

Legien is a surname. Notable people with the surname include:

- Carl Legien (1861–1920), German union leader
- Waldemar Legień (born 1964), Polish judoka
