= Peretz Naftali =

Israeli politician (1888-1961)

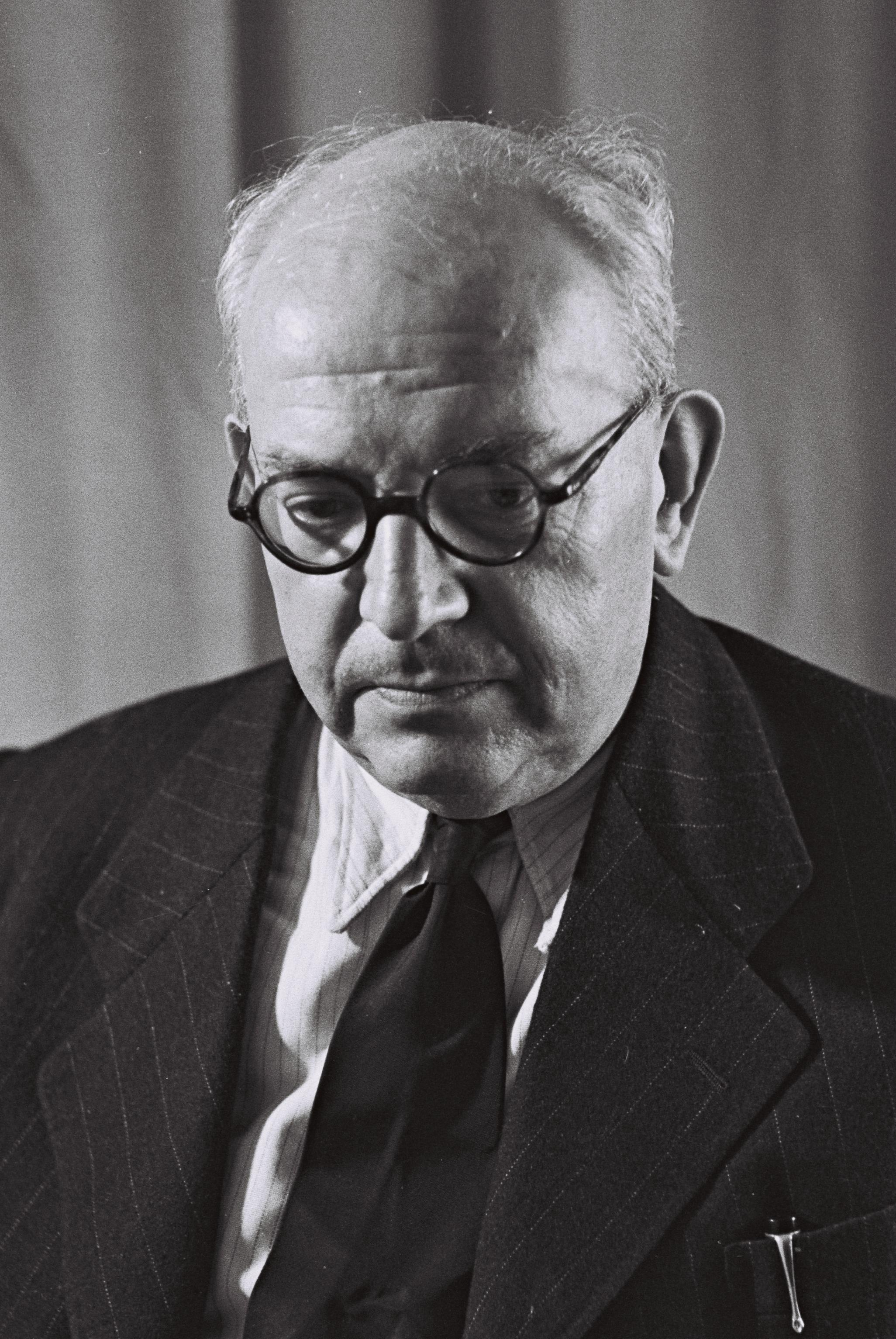
- Naftali in 1951

Ministerial roles
- 1951–1952: Minister without Portfolio
- 1952–1955: Minister of Agriculture
- 1955: Minister of Trade and Industry
- 1955–1959: Minister without Portfolio
- 1959: Minister of Welfare

Faction represented in the Knesset
- 1949–1959: Mapai

Personal details
- Born: 19 March 1888 Berlin, Germany
- Died: 30 April 1961 (aged 73)

Peretz Naftali (Hebrew: פרץ נפתלי; 19 March 1888 – 30 April 1961) was a German economist and trade union leader, and later Zionist activist and Israeli politician who served in several ministerial portfolios in the 1950s.

== Biography ==
Born Fritz Naftali in Berlin in 1888, he joined the Social Democratic Party of Germany in 1911. He served in the German Army between 1911 and 1912, after which he started to work as a journalist on economic affairs, returning to the army for a spell in 1917–18 to fight in World War I. In 1921, he became editor of the economics department of the Frankfurter Zeitung, a post he held until 1926, when he became head of the economic research department of a trade union. In 1921 he published a book, How to read the Economic Section of the Newspaper, which was a bestseller.

A member of the Provisional Reich Economic Council, from 1927 to 1933 he was head of the Economic Policy Research Centre of the General German Trade Union Federation (ADGB). In 1928 the ADGB convened a high-ranking commission which, in addition to Naftali, included Fritz Baade, Rudolf Hilferding, Erik Nölting and Hugo Sinzheimer. Its task was to develop a basic economic policy programme. Naftali published the results in his book Economic Democracy: Its Essence, Path and Goal (1928) and presented the results at the ADGB Federal Congress the same year. His basic thesis was that the political democratic rights achieved in the world of labour needed to be supplemented and secured through the "democratisation of the economy". In accordance with Hilferding's concept of "organised capitalism," Naftali saw a democratic economy and a socialist society as the ultimate goal. However, he believed that it must begin immediately with a gradual democratisation of the economy, stating that capitalism could be bent "before it is broken." The concept envisioned the participation of trade unions, the control of cartels and monopolies, and economic development measures. More important were interventions in central economic processes, less so at the operational level. The trade union reformism of the "Hamburg Model" formulated by Naftali met with broad approval within the ADGB. In contrast, the employers immediately launched a large-scale campaign against the alleged delusions of omnipotence expressed by the trade unions. The concept was also sharply rejected by the communists and was incapable of halting the secessionist tendencies. During the Great Depression, Naftali was one of the internal union critics of the so-called WTB plan, which had been developed primarily by Vladimir Woytinsky.

Naftali joined the Zionist movement in 1925, and in 1931 became a delegate to the Zionist Congress. Following the Nazi seizure of power, he fled Germany and emigrated to Mandatory Palestine in 1933, initially working as a lecturer at the Technion, before becoming director general of Bank Hapoalim in 1938, a post he held until 1949. Between 1941 and 1948 he served as a member of the Assembly of Representatives for Mapai.

He was elected to the Knesset in 1949 on Mapai's list. After being re-elected in 1951 he was appointed Minister without Portfolio in David Ben-Gurion's government. In June 1952 he became Minister of Agriculture, a role he held until the 1955 elections, after which he reverted to being a Minister without Portfolio. In January 1959 he became Minister of Welfare, but lost his Knesset seat and place in the cabinet in the 1959 elections.

== Literature ==
- Wirtschaftsdemokratie: Ihr Wesen, Weg und Ziel. Herausgegeben im Auftrag des Allgemeinen Deutschen Gewerkschaftsbundes von Fritz Naphtali. Berlin: Verlagsgesellschaft des Allgemeinen Deutschen Gewerkschaftsbundes, GmbH.; 1928.
