= John Morton (trade unionist) =

English trade unionist and musician (1925–2021)

John Morton (10 March 1925 – 26 January 2021) was an English trade unionist and musician.

Born in Wolverhampton, England, Morton learned to play the piano while he was a child. On leaving school, he started an apprenticeship as a printer, but his love of swing music led him to leave to play in a band. He joined the Union, and gradually rose to prominence, winning election to its executive committee, and leading a boycott of Wolverhampton's Scala Ballroom over its policy of only admitting white people.

Morton worked full-time for the union for a few years, but moved to become a lecturer in industrial relations at Solihull College. Despite this, he remained on the executive committee and, when General Secretary Hardie Ratcliffe announced his retiral, he asked Morton to run for the post.

Morton won election as general secretary, focusing much of his time on opposing the closure of orchestras, and negotiating with broadcasters, particularly the new independent local radio stations. He also became President of the International Federation of Musicians (FIM). He was elected to the General Council of the Trades Union Congress, serving from 1975 to 1985, and again from 1986 until his retirement. Politically, he was considered to have moved from the left wing of the union to the centre or right during this period.

Morton retired as general secretary in 1990, but remained president of the FIM until 2002, and president emeritus of the FIM thereafter. He died at the age of 95, in 2021.

Trade union offices
Preceded by Hardie Ratcliffe	General Secretary of the Musicians' Union; 1971–1990	Succeeded by Dennis Scard
Preceded by Hardie Ratcliffe	President of the International Federation of Musicians; 1973–2004	Succeeded by John F. Smith
Preceded by Roy Grantham and Alan Sapper	Non-manual workers representative on the General Council of the Trades Union Congress; 1975–1983; With: Alan Sapper	Succeeded by Council reorganised
