= International Union of Woodworkers =

The International Union of Woodworkers (IUW) was a global union federation bringing together unions representing wood carvers, carpenters and joiners.

== History ==
In 1891, the Belgian union of woodworkers organised the First International Wood Workers' Congress, in Brussels. The conference established an international information service, and this organised a further congress in Zurich in 1893, then a conference of woodworkers was organised in London in 1896, alongside the International Labour Congress. However, the information service then ceased to operate, and new international links were not established until 1899. In 1904, this led to the establishment of the International Union of Woodworkers at a conference in Amsterdam.

The federation was based in Stuttgart until 1909, then in Berlin, and from 1920 in Amsterdam. By 1925, it had 44 affiliates in 25 countries, with a total of 1,000,876 members. That year, the small Carpenters' International merged into it.

On 1 April 1934, the federation merged with the Building Workers' International, to form the International Federation of Building and Wood Workers.

== Affiliates ==
The following unions were affiliated in 1929:

| Union | Country |
|---|---|
| Amalgamated Society of Woodworkers | United Kingdom |
| Danish Union of Joiners | Denmark |
| General Dutch Union of Furniture Makers, Wallpapers and Related Workers | Netherlands |
| General Union of Building, Furnishing and Other Industries | Belgium |
| General Workers' Union of Yugoslavia | Yugoslavia |
| German Wood Workers' Union | Germany |
| Magyarországi Famunkazok Szövetsége | Hungary |
| National Amalgamated Furnishing Trades Association | United Kingdom |
| Norwegian Sawmill, Site and Planing Workers' Union | Norway |
| Norwegian Union of Building Workers | Norway |
| Norwegian Union of Furniture Makers | Norway |
| Swedish Building Wood Workers' Union | Sweden |
| Swedish Forest Workers' Union | Sweden |
| Swedish Sawmill Industry Workers' Union | Sweden |
| Swedish Wood Industry Workers' Union | Sweden |
| Swiss Construction and Woodworkers' Union | Switzerland |
| Unie Drevodelniku | Czechoslovakia |
| Union of Austrian Woodworkers | Austria |
| Union of Woodworkers and Turners | Czechoslovakia |
| United Brotherhood of Carpenters and Joiners | United States/Canada |
| Wood Workers' Union | Finland |
| Zwiazwk robotnikow przemyslu drzewnego w Polsce | Poland |

== General Secretaries ==
1904: Theodor Leipart
1920: Kees Woudenberg
1929: Fritz Tarnow
1933: Willem Hauwaert
