= WTB plan =

Proposed Economic Plan in Germany, 1932

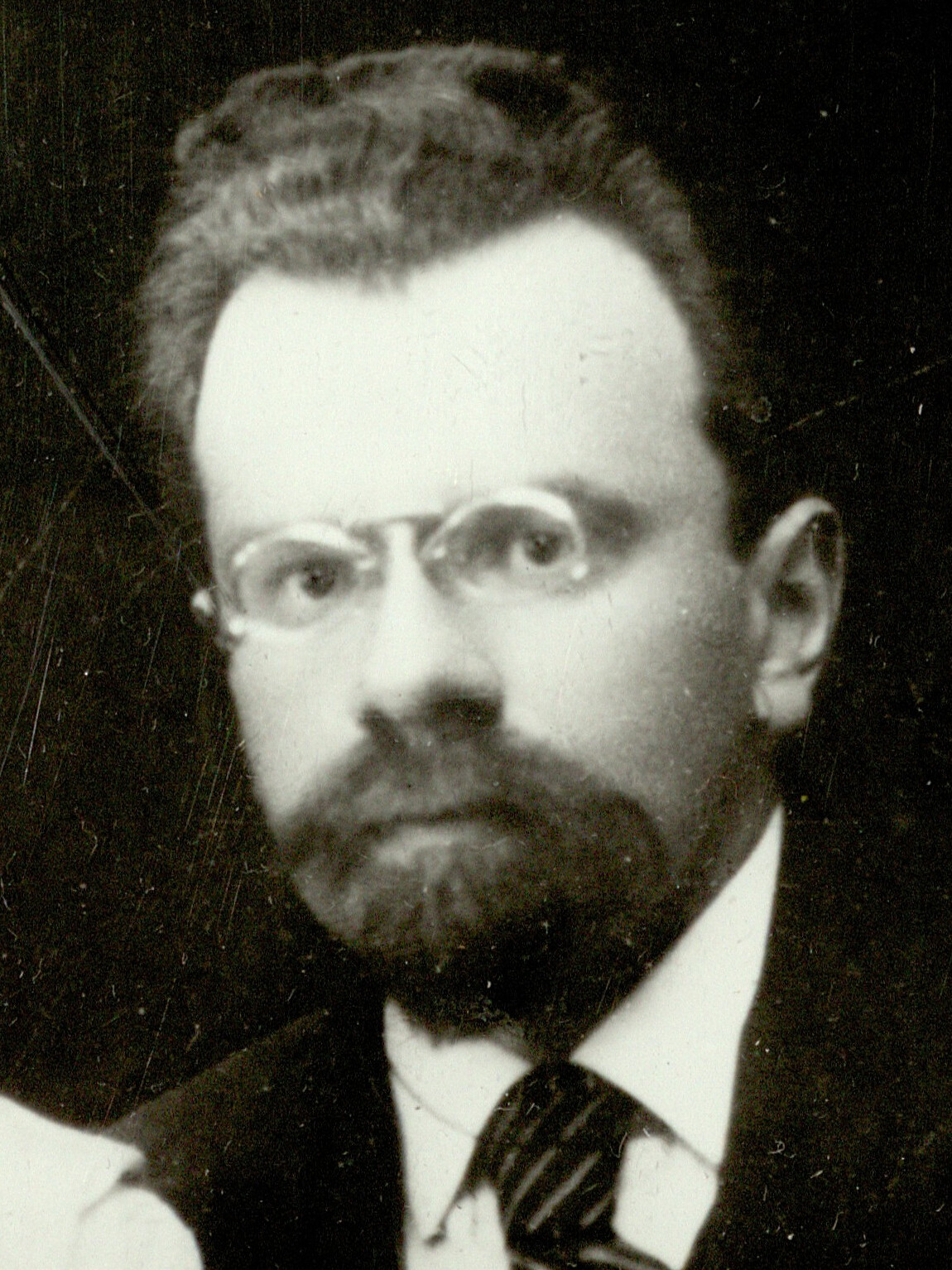
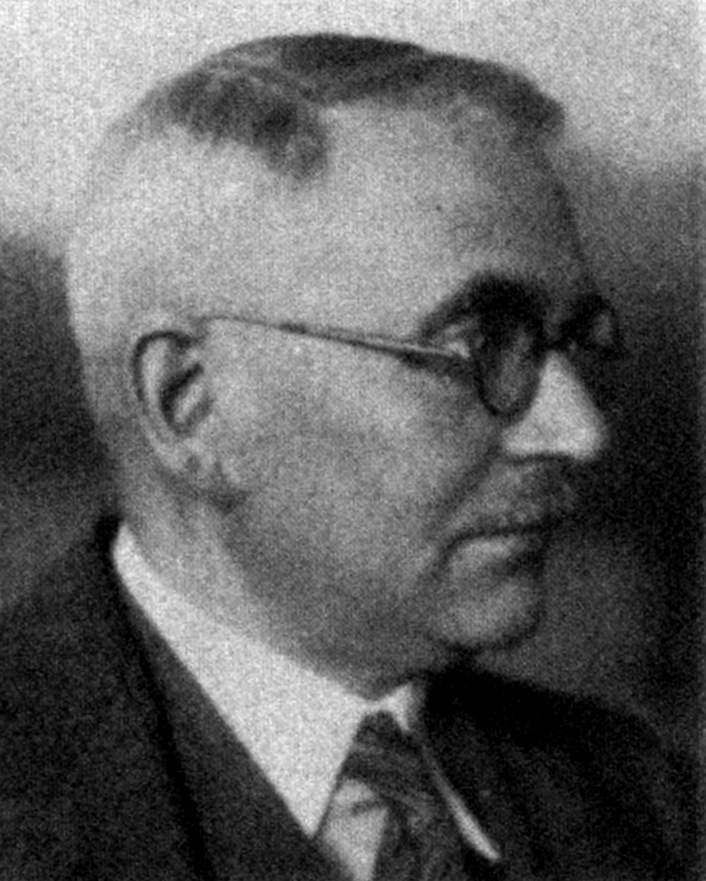
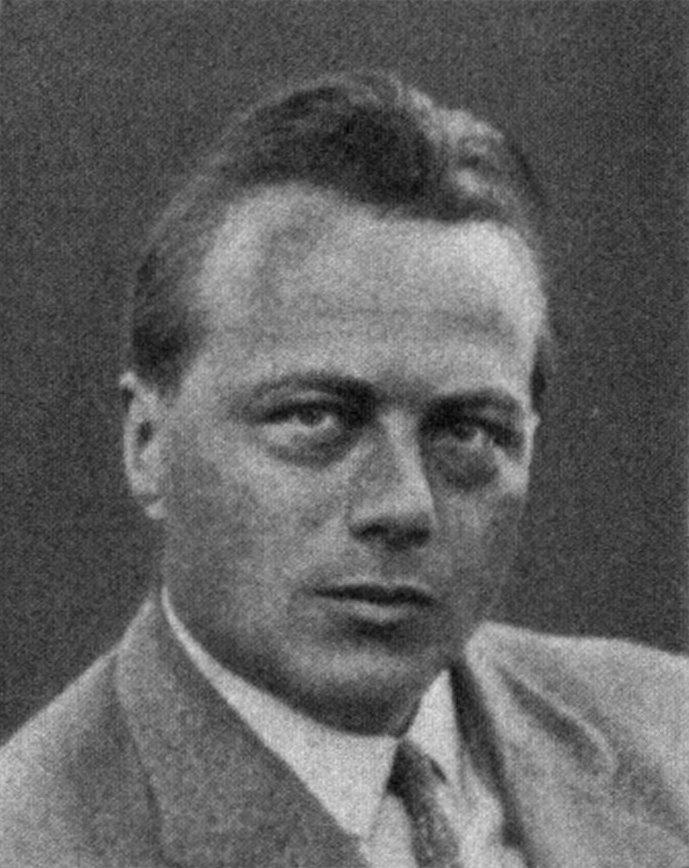
From left to right: Vladimir S. Voitinsky, Fritz Tarnow, and Fritz Baade, for whom the plan was named

The Woytinsky-Tarnow-Baade plan, abbreviated as the WTB plan, was a proposed debt-financed public employment program in Germany in 1932. It was intended to ease the effects of the Great Depression by ending the country's deflationary spiral and increase purchasing power. The plan would have seen the federal government fund one million public jobs via a loan from the German Central Bank of three billion Reichsmark (equivalent to 3% of GDP).

The plan was named for its three key proponents: Russian economist Vladimir S. Voitinsky (in German Woytinsky), woodworkers' union president Fritz Tarnow, and Social Democratic agriculture spokesman Fritz Baade. The three presented their plan to the Social Democratic Party of Germany (SPD) and German Trade Union Confederation in January 1932, but it was not adopted.

== Background ==
Woytinsky was a Russian economist and politician who had emigrated from the Soviet Union in 1921. He spent most of the 1920s in Germany, where he published a series of statistical economics books, The World in Figures. In the latter part of the decade he contributed to the Social Democratic theoretical journal Die Gesellschaft, through which he was hired by the General German Trade Union Federation (ADGB) as head of statistics and economic advisor.

After the onset of the depression, the government of Heinrich Brüning implemented a harsh austerity programme involving reductions in wages, welfare, and public expenditure, combined with tax increases. These policies were implemented via emergency decree and proved deeply unpopular. Contrary to Brüning's intentions, they also had the effect of worsening the depression, reducing growth and increasing unemployment.

Woytinsky identified deflation and the resultant lack of spending in the economy as a chief cause of the worsening economic situation and mass unemployment. During the years of 1931 and 1932 Germany was experiencing a 10% annual rate of deflation. In early 1931 Woytinsky began developing a preliminary version of what would become the WTB plan, proposing the injection of money into the European economy via large-scale public works on an international scale. He was supported by the ADGB and began publishing articles advocating his ideas in the union theoretical journal Die Arbeit in June 1931, opening debate over the concept of "active economic policy".

Toward the end of the year, Woytinsky had narrowed the scope of his proposals to a domestic scheme financed by bank loans. He continued to refine the plan and its theoretical basis. Previous opponents in the union movement including Fritz Tarnow were converted, and the two began to collaborate in promoting active economic policy to combat the depression. Along with Fritz Baade, the three presented their plan to a joint meeting of the SPD and ADGB boards.

== Reception ==
The plan had widespread appeal among the union movement and the lower levels of the Social Democratic Party, who were desperate for a strategy to reduce unemployment. Six million workers were unemployed during 1932 and as a result were facing destitution, exacerbated by cuts to unemployment benefits and social welfare. Woytinsky's work in Die Arbeit had sparked wide debate over active economic policy in the party and the unions, and some aspects garnered widespread support.

While Woytinsky had won over the bulk of the union movement by the end of 1931, most Social Democratic leaders were skeptical. Rudolf Hilferding, the party's widely respected chief theoretician and economist, opposed Woytinsky's ideas throughout their development and promotion. Hilferding adhered to the economic orthodoxy of the time. He believed that the periodic crises of capitalism were unavoidable and that state intervention could do little if anything to facilitate recovery. Fear of inflation was also widespread after Germany's experience with hyperinflation in the early 1920s: Hilferding believed that the inflationary impact of debt financing would erase any positive effects. Moreover, many socialists were disturbed by the idea of attempting to "rescue" capitalism from a crisis of its own making. Fritz Tarnow, though a supporter of the plan, articulated this dilemma:

Now, however, we stand at the sickbed of capitalism not only as diagnosticians, but also – yes, what can I say? – as a doctor who wants to heal? Or as a cheerful heir who can't wait for the end and would prefer to help things along with poison? This double role, doctor and heir, is a damn difficult task.

These arguments proved persuasive for large parts of the party. Social Democratic leaders also viewed the plan as an intrusion into the sphere of policymaking, which traditionally lay with the party, not the unions. Considering these factors, and with Hilferding staunchly opposed, the SPD board rejected the WTB plan in January 1932. The ADGB reluctantly followed their lead, declining to endorse the plan, but continued to call for large-scale public works and against deflation. Following this, the SPD tacked to the left throughout 1932. They endorsed public works but not deficit spending, and instead emphasised "transformation of the economy" and large-scale nationalisation of industries such as mining and banking as the way out of the crisis.
