= Albert Regge =

German trade union leader

Albert Regge (born 24 January 1866) was a German trade union leader.

Born in Pillkallen (now in Krasnoznamensky District) in East Prussia, Regge worked in the fur trade from 1881. He joined a local union in 1888, which became part of the German Fur Workers' Union two years later. He also joined the Social Democratic Party of Germany (SPD) in 1890. He began working full-time for the union in 1893, and became its president the following year, but it dissolved amid disputes in 1896.

In 1902, a new German Furriers' Union was founded, which Regge joined. He became its leader in 1910, also becoming editor of its journal, Der Kürschner. In addition, he was elected as general secretary of the International Federation of Furriers. He opposed World War I, resigning from the SPD, and becoming a founder member of the Independent Social Democratic Party of Germany, which he remained with until 1922, when, like the majority of the part, he rejoined the SPD.

Membership of the Furriers' Union initially grew under Regge's leadership, peaking at 12,076 in 1921, but it then fell rapidly. As a result, at the start of 1924, Regge merged the union into the German Clothing Workers' Union (DBAV). The DBAV set up a furriers' section, employing Regge. The following year, the International Federation similarly merged into the International Clothing Workers' Federation.

In 1930, Regge and Heinrich Lange wrote Geschichte der Zurichter, Kürschner und Mützenmacher Deutschlands.

Trade union offices
Preceded by Ernst Schubert	President of the German Furriers' Union; 1910–1923	Succeeded by Union merged
Preceded by ?	General Secretary of the International Federation of Furriers; 1910–1925	Succeeded by Federation merged
