= Theodor Leipart =

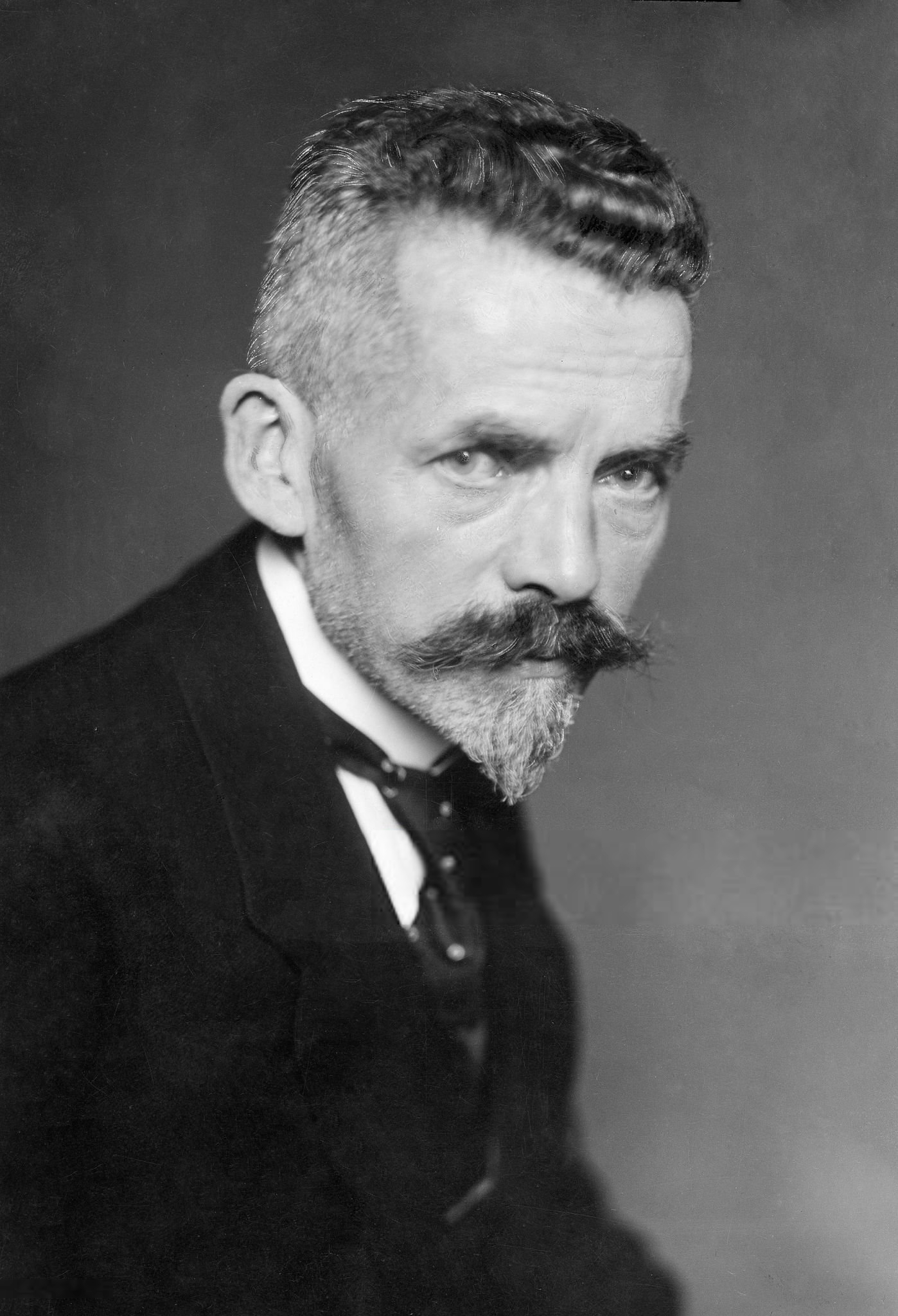
- Leipart c. 1924

Chairman of the General German Trade Union Federation
- In office 19 January 1921 – 2 May 1933
- Preceded by: Carl Legien
- Succeeded by: Position abolished

Minister of Labour of the Free People's State of Württemberg
- In office 21 June 1919 – 22 June 1920
- Minister-President: Wilhelm Blos
- Preceded by: Alexander Schlicke
- Succeeded by: Wilhelm Schall

Member of the Landtag of Württemberg
- In office 6 June 1920 – 14 February 1921
- Preceded by: Multi-member district
- Succeeded by: Erwin Nesper

Personal details
- Born: 18 May 1867 Neubrandenburg, Grand Duchy of Mecklenburg-Strelitz, North German Confederation
- Died: 23 March 1947 Berlin, Allied-occupied Germany
- Party: SPD (1886–1946); SED (after 1946)
- Spouse: Maria Neher
- Children: 1
- Occupation: Labor Leader; Politician; Lathe Operator
- Other offices held: 1908–1919: President, German Wood Workers' Union; 1904–1920: General Secretary, International Union of Woodworkers

Theodor Leipart (17 May 1867 – 23 March 1947) was a German trade unionist and politician who served as chairman of the General German Trade Union Federation from 1921 to 1933, during most of the Weimar Era.

== Life ==
=== Provenance and early years ===
Theodor Leipart was born into a Protestant family, the seventh of his parents' twelve recorded children, in Neubrandenburg, then in the eastern part of Mecklenburg-Strelitz, a grand duchy in the North German Confederation. Ernst Alexander Leipart (1831–1885), his father, was trained and had worked initially as a self-employed tailor specialising in women's dresses. By the time Theodor was born, however, his father had a more itinerant job, travelling for the "Bettfeder-Reinigungs-Anstalt" (literally, "Bed-springs cleaning institution"). His mother, born Wilhelmine Charlotte Friederike Schmidt, was the daughter of a machinist. She travelled with her husband, possibly working with him on the bed-springs cleaning, while Leipart was brought up by his maternal grandparents in Neubrandenburg. It was here that he attended middle school and here, in 1881, that he was confirmed into the church. His schooling was made possible through funding from a local "syndikus" and brought him into contact, as he later recalled, with some excellent teachers. Looking back, he would speculate that it was this early experience of "solidarity between [middle and working] classes" that made him a "less radical" socialist than he might otherwise have become. Pride in his working-class background and loyalty to those class roots would nevertheless remain defining themes throughout his life.

Between 1881 and 1885 he lived in Hamburg, training for work as a Drechsler (lathe operator), working at that time almost exclusively with wood. He had wanted to train as a gardener, but two of his uncles were lathe operators, and had offered to take him on as a trainee without charge. Having completed his training, in 1886 he joined the Social Democratic trades union movement. That year he was elected to the executive of the Hamburg section of the German Lathe-operators' Union ("Deutsche Drechslerverband").

=== The Woodworkers' Union ("Holzarbeiterverband") ===
Over the next few years he held a succession of trades union appointments. In July 1893 the Lathe-operators' Union was merged into the newly formed Woodworkers' Union ("Holzarbeiterverband"), which had its national head office, till 1919, in Stuttgart. In 1908 Leipart became chair of the Woodworkers' Union in succession to Carl Kloß. He retained his position at the top of what was, at the time, one of Germany's principal trades unions till 1919. In 1904, he also became the first secretary of the International Union of Wood Workers.

=== Württemberg Landtag ===
As imperial Germany made way for republican Germany, during 1919 the Woodworkers' Union moved its national headquarters from Stuttgart to Berlin, and Leipart relinquished the union chairmanship. At around the same time, in the People's State of Württemberg ("Volksstaat Württemberg"), he accepted an invitation to join the regional government as Minister for Labour under the regional minister-president Wilhelm Blos in July 1919. That appointment lasted just over a year, since the Blos government collapsed in August 1920. Meanwhile, on 6 June 1920 the first regional elections of the republican era were held. The Social Democrats received 17 seats in the 100 seat regional legislature (Landtag), making them the third largest party, albeit by a very narrow margin, behind the Farmers' and Vintners' Party in second place and the Catholic Centre Party which topped he poll that year. Theodor Leipart was listed high enough up on the SPD candidate list for him to receive one of the party's seventeen seats. He resigned his Landtag membership on 14 February 1921, however, after slightly more than eight months.

=== Allgemeiner Deutscher Gewerkschaftsbund ("General German Trades Union Federation" / ADGB) ===
His brief parliamentary career had never been more than a sideline. The real focus for Leipart's talents and interests remained the trades union movement. Alongside his friend and comrade Carl Legien he played a pivotal role during the war and the ensuing period of social and political turmoil in the creation of the Allgemeiner Deutscher Gewerkschaftsbund ("General German Trades Union Federation" / ADGB), an amalgamation of 52 trade unions and other similar groupings. The drafting of the ADGB's statutes and the accompanying "programme of guidelines" ("... Richtlinien"), designed to place the movement ever more firmly on the path towards a free trades union movement, were chiefly his work. Following the sudden death of his "comrade in arms", Carl Legien, Leipart was elected to succeed Legien as chairman of the ADGB by the executive committee on 19 January 1921, an election that was endorsed by a full congress vote on 24 June 1922.

That same year he was appointed vice-president of the International Federation of Trade Unions (IFTU). Between 1921 and 1925 he belonged to the executive council ("Verewaltungsrat") of the International Labour Organization (ILO). In addition, he continued to serve as chair of the National Economic Council and in a succession of other trades union related institutions. He also founded "Die Arbeit" (literally, "Work"), a trades union monthly news magazine which appeared between 1924 and 1933.

Between 1922 and 1933, as leader of Germany's trades union movement, Leipart earned plaudits for the skill and patience with which he was able to integrate hitherto opposed groupings and works councils. He advanced in practical ways the concept of economic democracy and he was an eloquent advocate for trades union autonomy and responsibility. He was never a man for confrontation, preferring to apply compromise and flexibility in response to changing political currents and shifting power balances. The strategy worked very well during the early years of the German republic and the savage challenges of the inflation crisis. However, as later commentators, able to view history through the revealing prism of subsequent events, were quick to point out, the instinct for compromise did nothing to arrest the tide of post-democratic populism that came to the fore after 1929. There were those who later blamed the success of Nazism on the so-called "Leipart way" ("Leipart-Kurs"), which historians have subsequently competed to explain, justify or condemn.

=== Responding to political crises ===
1932 was a year of two general elections, which together seemed to demonstrate that support for political extremism had reached such a level that the parties committed to a democratic political structure could no longer exclude the populists from power. On 22 June 1932 the ADGB executive issued a declaration to the effect that the struggle against the common enemy made it an imperative duty, incumbent on the entire German labour movement, to operate a united front. That the ADGB, representing the trades union element movement within that united front, and in particular the leadership of the ADGB, would play a central mediating role, was recognized on all sides. The problem with this analysis was that the German labour movement rested on two principal pillars: the Social Democrats and the Communists. Taking their lead from Moscow, but also mindful of their origins as a breakaway movement from the Social Democrats that had split because of opposition to support for the war, the German communists opposed the Social Democrats with a hatred and passion worthy of the Nazi Party itself. There would be no common cause between Social Democrats and Communists. On 14 October 1932 Theodor Leipart delivered a keynote speech to the ADGB national "trades union college" ("Bundesschule des ADGB") at Bernau (Berlin). He asserted that at a time of intensifying political crisis, the ADGB were no longer inclined to "be bound by party ties" ("Parteifesseln zu tragen"). He presented this as a response to the charge that the ADGB "was not sufficiently national" ("Man wirft uns vor, dass wir nicht national seien"). The carefully nuanced formulation was intended to send a message to the increasingly influential Nazi leaders that the unions could no longer be seen simply as an extension of the Social Democratic Party, despite the long-standing ties that bound the two. Attempts by Leipart to strengthen the labour movement by fostering ever greater unity between free trades unions continued, but his apparently persisting hope that the ADGB might be able to stand aside from the looming political confrontations turned out to be hugely over-optimistic.

The failure of the mainstream parties to gain a parliamentary majority among themselves, combined with their refusal to enter into coalition with Nazis or Communists, meant that during 1932 Chancellor Brüning resorted to the desperate measure of administering the country through a series of emergency decrees. It provided an unfortunate precedent for 1933. In the meantime, fearful of triggering something even worse, Theodor Leipart and other ADGB bosses went along with Brüning's strategy. The strategy may have bought time for the government, but in January 1933 the Nazis nevertheless took power and lost no time in transforming Germany into a one-party dictatorship. The union leaders continued to try and negotiate with the Nazi leadership even after the Reichstag fire. Serious talks took place with representatives of the Nazi business organisation as late as April 1933, although these were massively controversial within the union.

Twelve years later, after the Nazi nightmare had run its course, it was put to Leipart that he should have reacted to the Nazi power seizure by immediately calling a general strike. He ascribed the ADGB's failure to confront the changes of January 1933 to various factors, including the crisis levels of unemployment in the country which would have weakened the union's ability to enforce a strike, the fact that the Nazis had already effectively "taken over" key utilities such as the electricity and water companies, the high level of support that Hitler enjoyed with his "middle-class powerbase and entrepreneurs" ("bürgerliche Kräfte und Unternehmer") and, finally, the fact that Hitler had come to power legally, which was (and remains) a judgment widely backed by constitutional experts, and which meant that a general strike against a legitimately installed government would have been an act of insurrection against the constitution itself. Leipart was also criticised at the time and subsequently over the resolution of the ADGB national executive of 19 April 1933, which expanded on his own call on 15 April 1933, that trades union members should participate in Nazi Labour Day celebrations scheduled for 1 May 1933. His reasoning was that he had wanted to protect union members from exposure to Nazi reprisals that would have followed if they had failed to celebrate in public the fascist version of Labour Day. Nevertheless, the verdict of subsequent commentators was that Leipart's non-confrontational approach over this matter further weakened the resolve of socialists who might otherwise have opposed the Nazis in greater numbers and with greater impact than they did.

Theodor Leipart was a few months short of his sixty sixth birthday when the Nazis took power, and during the next twelve years he lived, for the most part, quietly in Berlin, and was seen to be politically inactive. He nevertheless remained consistently, if passively, hostile to the Nazis. He repeatedly refused to hand over control of the ADGB to the Nazis "voluntarily", rejecting the bribe of an enhanced pension if he were to do so. It is fair to charge the union leaders who failed actively to oppose Nazism in 1932 and 1933 of poor judgement, individually and collectively. They completely failed to understand the true character of Nazi populism till it was too late. But there is little evidence to support the accusation of wilful "betrayal".

=== Nazi years ===
The independent trades unions were outlawed on 2 May 1933 and quickly crushed. Theodor Leipart was among those arrested and taken into "protective custody". He was subjected to physical abuse. An eye-witness later recalled, "Leipart's personal courage was beyond question. I was present at one of the Nazi torture chambers in 1933. Nazi paramilitaries threatened him with their pistols cocked, as one of a group of four torture subjects, while trying to extract information about the whereabouts of 'Reichsbanner leader Höltermann'. The old man ... yelled defiantly at the executioners until he collapsed and was carted off to hospital". A few days later, on 9 May 1933, the authorities launched a "preliminary investigation on account of disloyalty ... against Leipart and comrades". The investigation was never concluded and there was no ensuing prosecution, but the actions taken were sufficient to provide a cloak of legitimacy for giving the union leaders criminal records and to create a "legal basis" for the complete confiscation of the union assets. The Nazis subsequently denied Leipart any of his pension on the grounds that he had "abused his office as chairman of the ADGB to promote Marxist aspirations". Leipart's term of "protective custody" turned out to be relatively brief, which according to at least one source was because of his poor health and his wife's intervention, as a result of which he was released in order to spend time in hospital, from where he was able to return to his home.

=== Final years ===
During the twelve Nazi years Leipart was able to remain discreetly in touch with comrades from the old days, notably Wilhelm Leuschner, Jakob Kaiser and Hermann Schlimme. The old comrades were "of one mind, that after the Hitler catastrophe and the devastation of a second 'world war', there should no longer be any place for political or ideological divisions between trades unions, but that only unity could be the order of the day in order to cope with the immensity of the tasks ahead.

War ended in May 1945, leaving the western two thirds of Germany divided into four military zones of occupation. Surrounded by the Soviet occupation zone Berlin, where Theodor Leipart still lived, was itself subdivided into military occupation zones, although it would be several more years before physical barriers appeared that would prevent people from walking freely through the ruins and across the political boundaries that now divided the city. Leipart's home had ended up in Berlin's US occupation zone. From the papers left behind when he died, it is clear that during the war years Leipart devoted considerable time and attention to working through the history of the ADGB and other aspects of trades union history in which he had participated. His papers included several lengthy manuscripts on these topics. They confirm that, like many other Social Democrats, he was more than ever committed to political unity both within the labour movement and between the parties of the political left. When in 1946 he became a member of the newly formed Socialist Unity Party ("Sozialistische Einheitspartei Deutschlands"/ SED), it was almost certainly out of conviction and not because he had somehow been pressured into taking the step. The SED was the product of a contentious merger between the old Communist Party of Germany and the Social Democratic Party. Although the political merger seems to have been intended by its backers to apply across the whole of occupied Germany, it really only took effect in those parts of the country administered as the Soviet occupation zone. Shortly before he died, in a discussion over the postwar political situation, Leipart was asked by a reporter about the bitter hostility that the Communists had heaped on the Social Democrats before 1933, in ways which had made it completely impossible for the political left to present a united front against Nazism. Leipart's reply was characteristic: "You also need to know how to forget" ("Man muß auch vergessen können.").

The merger that created the SED was enacted in April 1946 through a ballot of party members from both the parties affected. Campaigning was not always friendly. Because he lived in the US sector Leipart was spared from the full impact of the "Soviet grip" ("Zugriff der Sowjets« ") which he might have expected from canvassers if he had lived in Berlin's Soviet sector, "although the comrades attempted to collect the completed ballot paper from me in my apartment" ("obwohl die Genossen versuchten, bei mir in der Wohnung den ausgefüllten Stimmzettel abzuholen"). In order to unify the political left, he was prepared to join the merged party, but he had not been able to bring himself to vote for the party merger that created it, thereby replacing - if only in what later became East Germany - the old Social Democratic Party.

By March 1947 there were still plenty of former comrades who remembered 1933 and the failure of the ADGB to take a lead in opposing the slide into what had turned out to be catastrophic dictatorship. He was shunned by most of those whom he once been able to count on as his friends. Theodor Leipart died an isolated figure. His grave now forms part of the Memorial to the Socialists (German: Gedenkstätte der Sozialisten) in the Friedrichsfelde Central Cemetery, Berlin.

== Reflection ==
Irrespective of how some of his individual judgements may be viewed, it must be concluded that as a "democrat out of principle" and a social democratic trades unionist, Theodor Leipart made a lasting contribution to the democratic and social security of wage earners in the capitalist context of his time. That provided a solid foundation for further trades union advances after the Second World War. However, if he is to be evaluated in terms of his socialist objectives, striving for equality and freedom for individuals, and the "people's solidarity" ("Volksganze"), then since he was basing his aspirations on a supposedly neutral state, he failed because of the underlying political realities of the time. That the creation of the SED failed to create a unified labour movement would have been a final disappointment, but he was spared from that by the timing of his death.

Trade union offices
Preceded by Carl Legien	President of the Union of Woodturners in Germany; 1891–1893	Succeeded by Union merged
Preceded by New position	President of the German Wood Workers' Union; 1893–1919; With: Karl Kloß (1893–1908); Fritz Tarnow (1908–1919)	Succeeded by Adam Neumann and Fritz Tarnow
Preceded by New position	Secretary of the International Union of Wood Workers; 1904–1919	Succeeded by Kees Woudenberg
