= Fred Dambman =

- Born: 17 February 1880
- Died: 1 February 1957 (aged 76)
- Occupation: Civil servant
- Known for: Commissioner for Native Affairs in South Africa

Frederic Dambman (10 August 1880 – 7 August 1952) was a Scottish musician and trade union leader.

Born in Edinburgh, Dambman became a violin and viola player. He joined the Musicians' Union in 1902, and soon became the full-time secretary of its Manchester branch. He left the position temporarily to serve in World War I, but returned after the war.

In 1925, the union's general secretary, Joe Williams, resigned, and Dambman ran in the election to succeed him. He lost to E. S. Teale, but was rewarded with the post of Assistant General Secretary. Teale's health soon declined, and Dambman undertook much of his work. In 1931, Teale died, and Dambman was elected as his successor, beating William Batten, John Briggs, and a candidate named Whitaker. However, Batten was heavily favoured in London, Dambman winning the rest of the country.

The union was in financial difficulty, and the combined impact of the Great Depression and the move to talkies meant that many members faced unemployment. He reached agreements with the British Broadcasting Corporation and Phonographic Performance Limited on payments to musicians. He also persuaded the union to affiliate to the Labour Party, and unsuccessfully campaigned for musicians to be exempted from enlistment during World War II.

Dambman expected to retire when he was 65, but was asked to remain in position by the union's executive. He ultimately retired three years later.

Trade union offices
Preceded by E. S. Teale	General Secretary of the Musicians' Union; 1931–1948	Succeeded by Hardie Ratcliffe
