= General Workers' Union =

General Workers' Union may refer to:

- General Workers' Union (Argentina), a labor confederation from 1903 to 1909
- General Workers' Union (Belize)
- General Workers' Union of Germany, a left communist organisation active in 1918 and 1919
- General Workers Union in Ivory Coast, a trade union federation established in 1962
- General Workers' Union (Malta), a trade union federation
- General Union of Workers (Portugal)
- General Workers' Union (South Africa), a union active from 1977 until 1986
- General Workers' Union of Yugoslavia, active from 1917 until 1939
- Unión General de Trabajadores, in Spain
