= International Secretariat of National Trade Union Centres =

Former federation of trade unions

The International Secretariat of National Trade Union Centres (ISNTUC), often simply referred to as the International Secretariat and later renamed the International Federation of Trade Unions (IFTU), was an international consultative body of trade unions. Founded in 1901, it broke apart and became defunct during the First World War.

== Founding ==
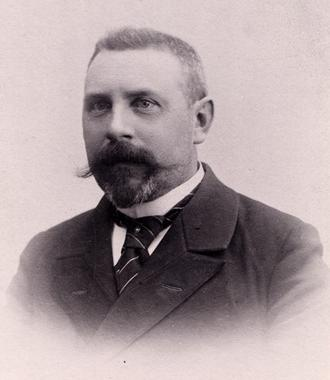
Jens Jensen, initiator of ISNTUC.

ISNTUC was founded in Copenhagen, Denmark, on August 21, 1901. Founding members of the new International Secretariat were the German, French, British, Belgian, Swedish, Danish, Norwegian and Finnish trade union centres. Together the founding organizations had a combined membership of 1 168 000.

The idea to build an international trade union structure had been a proposal of the Danish union president Jens Jensen. In 1900 the British General Federation of Trade Unions leader Isaac Mitchell supported the idea, whilst the leader of the German Generalkommission der Gewerkschaften Deutschlands (which had one million members at the time) Carl Legien pledged to provide financial and administrative support to the new international organization.

Parallel to the ISNTUC were various International Trade Secretariats, most of them based in Germany and, like the ISNTUC, dependent on support from the German unions.

In 1903 Legien became Secretary of ISNTUC and the headquarters of the organization was moved to Berlin.

== Political divisions ==
The activities of ISNTUC were largely limited to exchanging information between unions and providing support to development of national union federations. Politically, the organization was subordinated to the socialist Second International. The majority within ISNTUC, led by the German trade unions, were firmly Social Democratic and emphasized the need to leave the political affairs to the political international. However, this subordination was not uncontroversial. The French Confédération générale du travail (CGT) adhered to the syndicalist line and harshly criticized the lack of independent political advocacy of ISNTUC. This dispute was notable both at the 1907 (Stuttgart) and 1910 (Copenhagen) congresses of ISNTUC. CGT withdrew from ISNTUC in 1905 and returned in 1909.

But there was also a third category of organizations in the ISNTUC apart from the syndicalists and Social Democrats, namely politically non-aligned neutral union centres, like the American Federation of Labor and the British GFTU. The CGT and AFL, albeit for politically different reasons, sought to distance the ISNTUC from the Second International and give ISNTUC more of a coordinating role. Whilst the German unions were unwilling to accept any real changes in the character of the organization, they were able to accommodate the CGT and AFL in symbolic gestures. At the 1913 Zurich congress of ISNTUC the name of the organization was changed to International Federation of Trade Unions.

== Outbreak of the war ==
At the time the IFTU was becoming a more well-functioning organization, active in publishing trade union literature. In 1913 the organization had affiliates in 19 countries, with a combined membership of seven million. At the eve of the First World War, the IFTU secretariat in Germany had 12 full-time employees (4 British, 4 Swiss, 2 Germans, 1 American and 1 Danish).

When the war broke out, the foreign staff left and the publication of the IFTU organ Correspondence Syndicale ceased.

IFTU was divided into Allied, German and neutral camps. The trade unions in the Allied countries demanded that the IFTU secretariat be moved out of Germany. Legien tried to appease this demand by setting up a liaison office in Amsterdam, in cooperation with the NVV leader Jan Oudegeest. This did not please the French and British unions, however. In July 1916 a trade union conference was held in Leeds, which decided to set up a Correspondence Office in Paris, under the supervision of Léon Jouhaux.

== Refoundation ==
In 1919, after the end of the war, a new International Federation of Trade Unions was reconstituted at a conference in Bern.
