= Kees Woudenberg =

Dutch politician

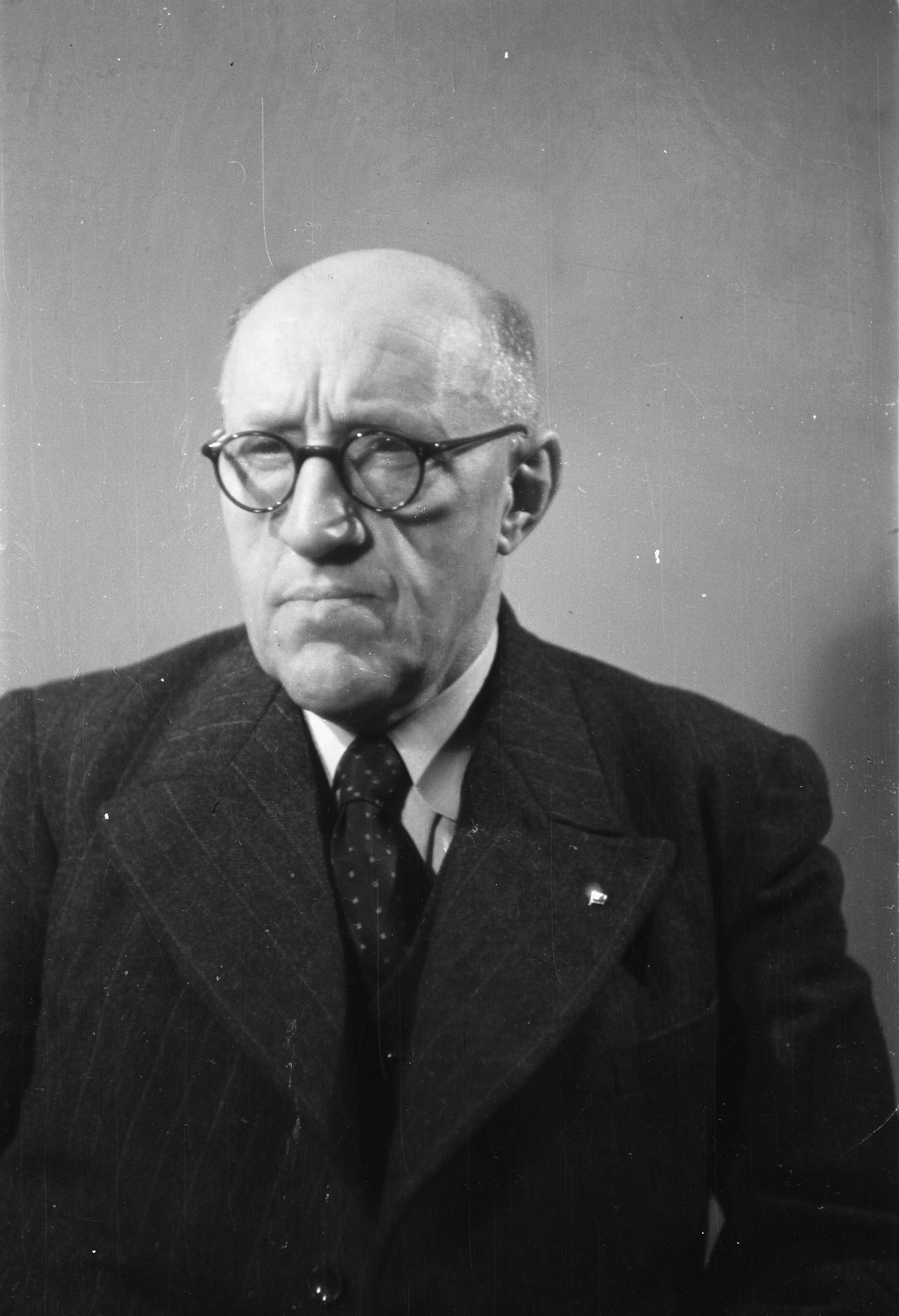
Woudenberg in 1946

Cornelis Woudenberg (16 December 1883 – 16 October 1954) was a Dutch trade unionist and politician.

Born in Amsterdam, Woudenberg became a carpenter, and in 1901 he joined the De Zaaier, a newly-formed union for young workers. Soon afterwards, he joined the General Furniture Makers' Union. His branch left the union in 1903, preferring a syndicalist approach, but Woudenberg helped form a new branch of the old union.

In about 1910, Woudenberg became branch secretary, a part-time role, and from 1913 he also served as treasurer, becoming a full-time official. In 1914, he was elected to the union's executive, and also became vice president, while in 1917 he became one of the union's secretaries. Three years later, he was elected as the union's president, and he also began editing its journal, Ons Vakblad. He helped reform the International Federation of Woodworkers after World War I, and he became its general secretary. He managed to persuade the large American union, the United Brotherhood of Carpenters and Joiners, to affiliate.

Woudenberg was a member of the Social Democratic Workers' Party (SDAP), and in 1924 became the president of its Amsterdam section, also winning election to the city council. In 1929, he left his trade union posts, to become secretary of the party. He was considered a good organiser, and argued that the party should oppose all wage reductions, but was not a strong speaker.

After the Nazis occupied the Netherlands, Woudenberg briefly became the effective head of the SDAP, but he found that the Nazis wished to use it as a puppet organisation, and so resigned. In contrast, his brother, Hendrik Jan Woudenberg, was an enthusiastic Nazi supporter and was appointed to lead the trade union movement. Kees spent the remainder of the war travelling around the country, maintaining links between SDAP supporters.

At the end of World War II, the SDAP was re-established, and Woudenberg continued as its secretary and treasurer. It was replaced by the Labour Party in 1946, and Woudenberg again became secretary and treasurer, retiring in 1949. From 1945 until 1950, he also served in the Senate.

Trade union offices
Preceded by Freek van der Walle	President of the General Dutch Union of Furniture Makers, Wallpapers and Related Workers; 1919–1929	Succeeded by ?
Preceded by Theodor Leipart	President of the International Federation of Wood Workers; 1919–1929	Succeeded by Fritz Tarnow
Party political offices
Preceded by Kees Workhoven	Secretary and Treasurer of the Social Democratic Workers'Party; 1929–1946	Succeeded by Party dissolved
