= Hardie Ratcliffe =

English musician (1906–1975)

- Born: John Hardie Ratcliffe; 2 January 1906; Liverpool, England
- Died: 26 May 1975 (aged 69) London, England
- Occupation: Musician
- Instruments: Saxophone; flute
- Years active: 1923–1971

John Hardie Ratcliffe (2 January 1906 – 26 May 1975) was an English musician, and General Secretary of the United Kingdom Musicians' Union from 1948.

Ratcliffe was born in 1906 in Liverpool, and named after Keir Hardie. In childhood, he played saxophone and flute, and by the age of 17, when he joined the union, was already performing theatre orchestras in various towns and cities. He established several branches of the union, and eventually gave up playing music, to devote all his energies to its administration, accepting a post as a full-time official in 1937. Although he gave notice of resignation in August 1962, during a dispute over internal policy matters, he was persuaded to withdraw it, and continued as General Secretary until his eventual retirement in 1971.

He appeared as a castaway on the BBC Radio programme Desert Island Discs on 9 November 1964, and died in 1975 in London.

Trade union offices
Preceded by Fred Dambman	General Secretary of the Musicians' Union; 1948–1970	Succeeded by John Morton
Preceded by William Batten	President of the International Federation of Musicians; 1950–1973	Succeeded by John Morton
