= Jens Jensen (trade unionist) =

Danish trade unionist and politician (1859–1928)

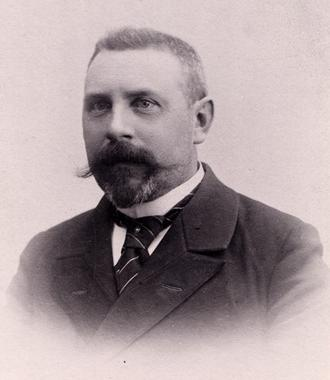
Jens Jensen

Jens Jensen (1859–1928) was a Danish trade unionist and Social Democratic politician. Jensen was a painter by profession. In 1879 he moved to Copenhagen. In 1883 he became the president of the Painters' Trade Union, and in 1898 he was one of the main founders of the United Trade Unions. Jensen was elected president of the union federation. During his tenure Jensen took the initiative to the first international trade union coordination, the International Secretariat of National Trade Union Centres.

From 1893 to 1903 Jensen served on the Copenhagen City Council. Between 1895 and 1903 he was a member of Folketinget. He later became the first Social Democratic mayor of Copenhagen.
