= Global union federation =

International federation of labor unions

A global union federation (GUF) is an international federation of national trade unions organizing in specific industry sectors or occupational groups. Historically, such federations in the social democratic tradition described as international trade secretariats (ITS), while those in the Christian democratic tradition described themselves as international trade federations. Equivalent sectoral bodies linked to the World Federation of Trade Unions described themselves as trade union internationals.

Many unions are members of one or more global union federations, relevant to the sectors where they have their members. Individual unions may also be affiliated to a national trade union centre, which in turn can be affiliated to the International Trade Union Confederation (ITUC) or the WFTU. This means that workers do not belong to the global union; instead, the individual workers belong to their local, and the local organization may choose to join one or more regional or national labor organizations, and each national organization may choose to join one or more global unions.

== Current federations ==
Federation	Acronym	Headquarters	Present (Note: Indicates year current name adopted)	Ref.
Building and Wood Workers' International	BWI	Geneva	2005	
Education International	EI	Brussels	1992	
Federation of International Civil Servants' Associations	FICSA	Geneva	1952	
Fédération Internationale des Associations de Footballeurs Professionnels	FIFPro	Hoofddoorp	1965	
IndustriALL Global Union	IndustriAll	Geneva	2012	
International Affiliation of Writers' Guilds	IAWG	Toronto	1986	
International Arts and Entertainment Alliance	IAEA	Brussels	1997	
International Domestic Workers Federation	IDWF	Hong Kong	2013	
International Federation of Actors	FIA	Brussels	1952	
International Federation of Air Line Pilots' Associations	IFALPA	Montreal	1948	
International Federation of Journalists	IFJ	Brussels	1926	
International Federation of Musicians	FIM	Paris	1948	
International Transport Workers' Federation	ITF	London	1896	
International Union of Food, Agricultural, Hotel, Restaurant, Catering, Tobacco and Allied Workers' Associations	IUF	Geneva	1920	
Public Services International	PSI	Ferney-Voltaire	1907	
UNI Global Union	UNI	Nyon	2000	

== Former secretariats ==
Federation	Acronym	Founded	Dissolved	Fate	Ref
Carpenters' International		1903	1925	Merged into IFBWW	
Communications International	CI	1920	2000	Merged into UNI	
International Agitation Commission of Carvers		1895	1919	Merged into IUW	
International Commission for Railwaymen		1893	1898	Merged into ITF	
International Commercial Employees' Secretariat		1909	1914	Dissolved	
International Committee of Entertainment and Media Unions	ICEMU	1992	2000	Dormant	
International Confederation of Musicians	ICM	1904	1920s	Dissolved	
International Federation of Bookbinders and Kindred Trades		1907	1949	Merged into IGF	
International Federation of Bakery Workers		1907	1920	Merged into IUF	
International Federation of Brewery Workers		1896	1920	Merged into IUF	
International Federation of Building and Wood Workers	IFBWW	1934	2005	Merged into BWI	
International Federation of Building Workers	IFBW	1903	1934	Merged into IFBWW	
International Federation of Chemical and General Workers' Unions	ICEF	1907	1995	Merged into ICEM	
International Federation of Chemical, Energy, Mine and General Workers' Unions	ICEM	1995	2012	Merged into IndustriALL	
International Federation of Civil Servants		1925	1935	Merged into PSI	
International Federation of Commercial, Clerical, Professional and Technical Employees	FIET	1921	1999	Merged into UNI	
International Federation of Enginemen and Firemen		1927	1939	Dissolved	
International Federation of Foundry Workers	IFF	1949	1954	Dissolved	
International Federation of Free Teachers' Unions	IFFTU	1951	1992	Merged into EI	
International Federation of Furriers		1894	1925	Merged into IGWF	
International Federation of Glass Workers		1908	1930s	Dissolved	
International Federation of Lithographers, Lithographic Printers and Kindred Trades		1897	1949	Merged into IGF	
International Federation of Meat Workers		1913	1920	Merged into IUF	
International Federation of Petroleum and Chemical Workers	IFPCW	1954	1976	Dissolved	
International Federation of Plantation and Agricultural Workers	IFPAW	1960	1994	Merged into IUF	
International Federation of Pottery Workers	IFPW	1905	1935	Merged into ICEF	
International Federation of Saddlers' Unions		1906	1921	Merged into the ISLWF	
International Federation of Secondary Teachers	FIPESO	1912	1993	Merged into EI	
International Federation of Teachers' Associations	IFTA	1926	1993	Merged into EI	
International Federation of Textile Workers' Associations	IFTWA	1893	1960	Merged into ITGWF	
International Federation of Tobacco Workers	IFTW	1889	1958	Merged into PWIF	
International Federation of Trade Unions of Audio-Visual Workers	FISTAV	1974	1993	Merged into MEI	
International Federation of Variety Artists	IFVA	1952	1970	Merged into FIA	
International Garment Workers' Federation	IGWF	1893	1960	Merged into ITGWF	
International Graphical Federation	IGF	1949	2000	Merged into UNI	
International Landworkers' Federation	ILF	1920	1960	Merged into IFPAW	
International Mercantile Marine Officers' Association	IMMOA	1926	1965	Merged into ITF	
International Metalworkers' Federation	IMF	1893	2012	Merged into IndustriALL	
International Seafarers' Federation	ISF	1918	1930s	Dissolved	
International Secretariat of Arts, Communications, Media and Entertainment Trade Unions	ISETU	1965	1993	Merged into MEI	
International Secretariat of Foundry Workers		1898	1904	Merged into IMF	
International Secretariat of the Glass Workers	IGWU	1892	1900	Dissolved	
International Secretariat of Painters and Allied Trades		1911	1946	Merged into IFBWW	
International Secretariat of Potters		1907	1922	Merged into IFBW	
International Secretariat of Stone Workers		1903	1946	Merged into IFBWW	
International Secretariat of Stone Setters		1904	1923	Merged into ISSM	
International Shoe and Leather Workers' Federation	ISLWF	1907	1970	Merged into ITGLWF	
International Textile and Garment Workers' Federation	ITGWF	1960	1970	Merged into ITGLWF	
International Textile, Garment and Leather Workers' Federation	ITGLWF	1970	2012	Merged into IndustriALL	
International Typographers' Secretariat	ITS	1889	1949	Merged into IGF	
International Union of Hatters		1900	1939	Dissolved	
International Union of Hairdressers		1907	1939	Dissolved	
International Union of Hotel, Restaurant and Bar Workers	IUHR	1908	1961	Merged into IUF	
International Union of Leather Workers		1891	1921	Merged into the ISLWF	
International Union of Wood Workers	IUW	1904	1934	Merged into IFBWW	
Media and Entertainment International	MEI	1993	2000	Merged into UNI	
Plantation Workers International Federation	PWIF	1957	1960	Merged into IFPAW	
Miners' International Federation	MIF	1890	1995	Merged into ICEM	
Teachers' International Trade Secretariat	ITST	1927	1946	Merged into FISE	
Universal Alliance of Diamond Workers	UADW	1905	2000	Merged into ICEM	
World Confederation of Organizations of the Teaching Profession	WCOTP	1951	1992	Merged into EI	
World Confederation of Teachers	WCT	1963	2007	Merged into EI	
World Federation of Building and Woodworkers' Unions	WFBW	1937	2005	Merged into BWI	
World Federation of Industry Workers	WFIW	1985	2007	Merged into ICEM	
World Organisation of the Teaching Profession	WOTP	1923	1951	Merged into WCOTP	

== See also ==
- Global Unions

== Sources ==
Books

- Burchill, Frank; Ross, Richard (1977). A History of the Potters' Union. Hanley: Ceramic and Allied Trades Union. ISBN 978-0-906210-01-7.
- Chen, Martha Alter (2005). Progress of the World's Women 2005: Women, Work, & Poverty. United Nations Publications. ISBN 978-1-932827-26-2.
- Gries, Rainer (2001). "Overview of the Development of International Trade Union Organisations". International Trade Union Organisations (PDF). Friedrich-Ebert-Stiftung. Archived (PDF) from the original on 22 June 2007.
- Rojot, Jacques (2006). "International Collective Bargaining". In Morley, Michael J.; Gunnigle, Patrick; Collings, David (eds.). Global Industrial Relations. New York: Routledge. ISBN 978-1-134-33079-9.
- Sassenbach, Johannes (1926). Twenty-five Years of International Trade Unionism. Amsterdam: International Federation of Trade Unions. OCLC 12336259.

Articles

- Sarkar, Santanu; Kuruvilla, Sarosh (19 January 2020). "Constructing Transnational Solidarity: The Role of Campaign Governance". British Journal of Industrial Relations. 58 (1). British Journal of Industrial Relations, 58(1): 27–49. doi:10.1111/bjir.12465.
- "Workers of world in new forum". The New York Times. Vienna. International Herald Tribune. 1 November 2006. Archived from the original on 5 February 2020.

Profiles

- "International Committee of Entertainment and Media Unions". Yearbook of International Organizations. Union of International Associations. 14 October 1999. Archived from the original on 5 February 2020.
- "World Federation of Building and Woodworkers Unions (WFBWU)". Yearbook of International Organizations. Union of International Associations. 26 June 2006. Archived from the original on 9 December 2019.
