= German Furriers' Union =

Former German Reich trade union (1902–1923)

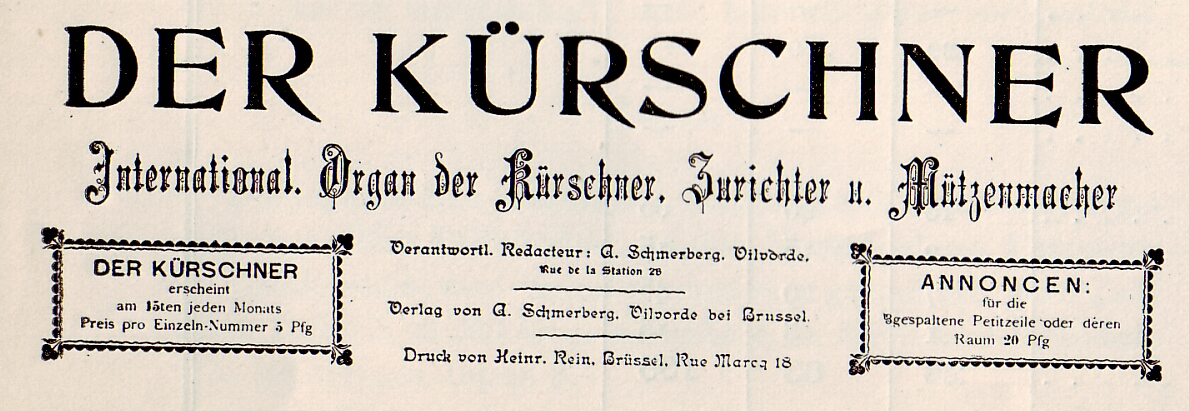
Header of Der Kürschner, the union's newspaper, from 1904

The German Furriers' Union (German: Deutscher Kürschner-Verband) was a trade union representing fur workers in Germany.

Local unions of furriers in Germany were established from 1883, and in 1890, they met in Hamburg to form a national association. However, due to disputes, this dissolved in 1896.

On 1 January 1902, the local unions of furriers formed a new national union, the "German Furriers' Union". This affiliated to the General Commission of German Trade Unions, and to the International Federation of Furriers, in which it soon became prominent. It adopted the international federation's German-language journal, Der Kürschner, as its publication.

The union was a founding constituent of the General German Trade Union Federation in 1919, and by 1921, it had 12,076 members. By the end of 1923, membership was down to 7,000, half of whom were women. At the start of 1924, the union merged into the German Clothing Workers' Union.

== Presidents ==
1902: Ernst Schubert
1910: Albert Regge
