= International Seafarers' Federation =

The International Seafarers' Federation (ISF) was a global union federation bringing together trade unions representing sailors.

Until the end of World War I, sailors were represented by the International Transport Workers' Federation (ITF), but unions representing sailors became increasingly convinced that the ITF was dominated by the interests of dockers and railway workers. The leadership of the National Union of Seamen (NUS, active in the UK) and the International Seamen's Union (ISU, active in the United States) were also unhappy that the ITF was increasingly sympathetic to socialism, and both unions left the international in 1917.

In 1918, the ISU and NUS formed the International Seafarers' Federation, working with unions from Belgium, Denmark, France, Italy, the Netherlands, Norway, Sweden, and several other countries. It was led by secretary Chris Damm, of the Belgian union. This left the ITF with few sailors in its membership.

In June 1920, the ISF met at an International Conference of Seafarers, in Genoa. The ISU viewed its greatest achievement as the Seamen's Act of 1915, and argued that the international should campaign to adopt similar laws throughout Europe. However, the NUS opposed the idea, and it was defeated.

Later in 1920, the Danish Seamen's Union went on strike, but both the NUS and the ISU opposed the action, to the extent that the ISU passed money collected for the strikers to the ISF, rather than the union. This alienated the Scandinavian unions from the ISF. The ITF took the opportunity to organised a seafarers' conference. This was held in 1921, the Scandinavian unions rejoining the ITF and building up its seafarers' section once more.

In 1922, the ISF discussed merging into the ITF, but the ISU stated that it would not be part of any merger, as it opposed being in the same organisation as dockers. The ISF survived into the 1930s, but undertook little further activity, and the seafarers' unions eventually rejoined the ITF.
