= Finnish Musicians' Union =

Trade union of Finland

The Finnish Musicians' Union (Finnish: Suomen Muusikkojen Liitto ry, Swedish: Finlands Musikerförbund rf) is a trade union representing musicians in Finland.

The union was founded in 1917, and was initially led by Robert Kajanus. While most of the union's members, its leading figures were composers, but in 1945 they split away to form the Finnish Society of Composers. That year, the union affiliated to the Finnish Federation of Trade Unions (SAK), but it left in 1957. In 1974, it joined SAK's successor, the Central Organisation of Finnish Trade Unions.

As of 2020, the union had 3,605 members. About one-third of its members are orchestral musicians, soloists and conductors, and the remainder include popular musicians and ballet dancers. The union is a member of the International Federation of Musicians and the Nordic Musicians' Union. The union owns Radio Helsinki, the G Livelab venue, and artists' residences in London, Berlin and Raseborg.
