= International Commission for Railwaymen =

The International Commission for Railwaymen was an early international trade secretariat, bringing together trade unions representing railway workers.

The federation was established in 1893, at a meeting in Zürich. It held further conferences in 1894 in Paris, and in 1895 in Milan. In 1898, it merged into the International Federation of Ship, Dock and River Workers, which renamed itself as the International Transport Workers' Federation.
