= International Federation of Furriers =

The International Federation of Furriers (German: Internationales Kürschner-Sekretariat) was a global union federation bringing together trade unions representing people who worked in the fur industry.

== History ==
An international conference of furriers was held in Brussels in June 1894, and at it, several unions agreed to form the "International Federation of Furriers". It was initially based in Vienna, but moved to Hamburg in 1901, and Berlin in 1909. In 1895, the secretariat launched a journal, The Furrier, which it originally published in three languages. From 1910, the federation's general secretary was Albert Regge.

One of the smaller international trade secretariats, immediately before World War I, it had only 6,169 affiliated members. By 1921 it had affiliates in Austria, Belgium, Denmark, Germany, Hungary and Sweden. At the time, the German Furriers' Union was by far the most important, contributing 12,076 of the secretariat's total 14,605 members. 8,808 of these members were women.

In January 1925, the secretariat merged into the International Clothing Workers' Federation.

== Affiliates ==
As of 1922, the following unions were affiliated:

Union	Country	Affiliated membership
Union of Fur Workers and Related Trades in Austria	Austria	1,329
Danish Hatters' and Furriers' Union	Denmark	480
German Furriers' Union	Germany	12,445
	Hungary	610
	Italy	52
	Norway	25
Swedish Hat and Fur Workers' Union	Sweden	578
International Fur & Leather Workers Union	United States	8,760
