= Musicians' Union (United Kingdom) =

Musicians' union in the UK

- Founded: 1893; 133 years ago
- Headquarters: London, England
- Location: United Kingdom
- Members: ▲35,879 (2024)
- General secretary: Naomi Pohl
- Affiliations: TUC; STUC; FEU; Labour Party
- Website: musiciansunion.org.uk

The Musicians' Union (MU) is an organisation which represents over 30,000 musicians working in all sectors of the British music business.

== Royalties ==
The Musicians' Union (MU) Royalty Department, in its current form, was set up in July 2011. For the most part it deals with income for non-featured (session musicians) from the further use or secondary use of sound recordings on which they have performed. The MU uses existing collective bargaining agreements with the British Phonographic Industry (BPI) to invoice record companies, film companies, advertising companies and production companies for use of performances, and is then responsible in distributing the funds collected to both MU members and non-MU members. The MU has no accessible database for member or non-member performers to access or cross-reference sound recordings in which they have performed.

== History ==
On 7 May 1893 in Manchester a meeting was held to form a union for musicians, twenty musicians attended and formed the Manchester Musicians' Union. The meeting had been organised by the union's first secretary, Joseph Bevir Williams, who became the leader of the Amalgamated Musicians' Union as the union was renamed to include artists from across the United Kingdom. On 8 June 1893, the first branch was formed in Dundee, with branches being formed in Glasgow, Newcastle upon Tyne and Liverpool in the first year and over one thousand members joined.

By 1894 the union had over two thousand members, and another seventeen branches had opened, these were focused in Scotland, the Midlands and the North of England. The union's first General Meeting was held in Manchester in 1893, the first conference took place in Liverpool the following year where the elected committee was appointed.

In 1894 the first strike happened in Liverpool Court Theatre, management had offered that the musicians in the orchestra take a pay cut and in doing so the theatre would open for four of the eight weeks during the summer when the theatre would normally shut. Williams led the strike and was able to have the wages of the majority of the orchestra reinstated. Further strikes happened in 1895 and 1897 in Leeds, in Oldham in 1897 and Northampton from 1908 to 1909. One of the prevalent reasons that the union had to strike in these places was due to management of theatres changing hands, the new management reduced wages or sacked those that were a part of the union and this led to strike action.

By 1895 membership had risen to over 3,000 and stayed at around this level until 1907. The issues that had caused the union to form were still prevalent at the start of the 1900s; there were too many musicians with not enough jobs, this issue was exacerbated by European musicians coming over to the United Kingdom to play. In 1897 a Blue Hungarian Band played at Queen Victoria's Diamond Jubilee, the union wrote to the government over the issue and the outcome was that foreign musicians could only join the union if they had been a resident in the country for over two years or had a membership to the musicians' union of their own country. Only musicians that were members of the union could play in the orchestras around the United Kingdom.

The union used the fees from membership to pay for wages for those that were striking, litigation fees for cases brought against members of the union or against the union itself and to pay for the printing of pamphlets and letters for its members. Copies of the union's report were sold for 1d, and the profit from this publication was used for the union's benevolent fund, this was used at a local level to pay for funeral bills of musicians that had died. After the RMS Titanic sunk on the 15 April 1912, the families of the eight musicians that had died on board the ship were given monies from the fund, the union also held a memorial concert at the Royal Albert Hall and sold over 80,000 copies of a print that depicted the musicians that had died. In 1909 a protest was held, through a barge on the Thames was covered in banners raising the issues that musicians were facing in the United Kingdom passing the House of Commons.

=== World War I ===
During the World War I membership rose from 8,608 in 1914 to 14,649 in 1918. Williams called off the disputes and strike action that branches were to take part in, Williams spoke with the management of halls and theatres in the hope of keeping the establishments open he agreed that every union member would take a pay cut to try and keep the buildings open during the war. There was a rise in people wishing to be entertained during the war, which meant that though there was a number of turnover during the war there was still enough musicians to fill the numbers needed. This was partly due to musicians, like women, amateurs and foreigners being allowed to fill spots that they would not typically have been able to apply for.

=== Musicians' Union ===
In 1921 the Musicians' Union was formed when the Amalgamated Musicians' Union merged with the National Orchestra Union of Professional Musicians (NOUPM). Williams resigned from the Union in 1924, after he announced partial retirement in 1923 due to his wife's and his own ill health. E. S. Teale took over from Williams for the next six years; however, Teale's health meant that the assistant general secretary, Fred Dambman had to step in towards the end of Teale's time with the union to complete the tasks that Teale was unable to.

Musicians had to find ways to adapt as jobs became more varied and they often had to learn new instruments and be flexible in order to keep their employment. This was partly due to the start of the British Broadcasting Company, many musicians gained employment with the organization, and the BBC became the first employer to offer their musicians a year-long contract with fixed hours, holiday allowance and a salary. The BBC had a significant number of orchestras, these were broken down either by their location, or their style and were highly coveted positions in the music industry.

=== The rise of the 'talkies' ===
The transition from silent films to 'talkies' meant that fewer musicians were employed at cinemas as sound was now pre-recorded. The Jazz Singer was the first of the talkies, and was first screened in the USA in 1927; by 1929 Fox had stopped making silent films and the rest of industry soon followed. There was a decline in membership to the union as many musicians became unemployed due to the rise of the 'talkies'. The American Federation of Musicians (AFM) was also put under pressure with 50,000 members being put out of work by 1928.

=== MPPA ===
The Musical Performers' Protection Association (MPPA) was formed in 1928 by the MU; this was to fight against the reproduction of member's work due to the advancement in technology which allowed for the recording of musicians work. There was no fee to join, and by June 1929 the Association had over 5,000 members. It was short lived as it could not fight against the rise of popularity in the 'talkies', the Association realised this and chose instead to focus its energy on the rise in popularity in using recordings on the radio and in public places.

=== World War II ===
The union did not want to follow Williams' footsteps in World War I and bargain for lesser wages for musicians, instead they hoped that the same pattern would repeat itself and that the music rise would see an increase in employment due to some musicians joining up. Membership rose to over 12,000 by 1945, this number had not been seen since 1931.

=== Hardie Ratcliffe ===
Fred Dambman had become general secretary after E. S. Teale in 1931. Before taking on this role Dambman had been the assistant general secretary. He was due to retire in 1945, but the MU asked him to stay in the post, which he did until the vote for the new general secretary in February 1948. Hardie Ratcliffe won the election by more than one thousand votes, with his only opponent for the role being Bettram Newton Brooke.

Ratcliffe was determined to fight against the use of recordings in dance halls unless the establishments paid the musicians for their contribution. This was partly achievable through the union's partnership with Phonographic Performance Limited (PPL), which had been established in 1934.

The popularity of records meant that live bands did not draw in the crowds that they once had. Music halls would rather play records than pay for a band. At the start of the 1970s the BBC was looking to reduce the size and the number of orchestras, which came as a blow to the MU. The union asked the government to get involved and Ratcliffe was relieved that the government was willing to help on this occasion. The BBC agreed not to fire large parts of the orchestras. However, from that year onwards they discussed closing all the orchestras.

The launch of Top of the Pops meant that viewers were watching live music but paying nothing to the artist performing, so the union enforced a ban, which meant that artists had to mime. This ban came into effect in 1966.

Ratcliffe lobbied the government to push forward new copyright legislation but the legislation was not enshrined by law until 1996. In 1970 Ratcliffe discussed his plans to retire. There were three candidates for the position and John Morton won.

=== John Morton ===
John Morton had been with the union for years and had held a number of positions with the organisation. He was excited to take on the role when so many of the previous members of the committee were retiring around the same time, thus allowI b fresh blood to guide the union.

The BBC had been assessing their need for twelve-piece orchestras and the expense in having them. By 1976 they employed 589 musicians. In the early 1980s the BBC were forced to make cuts because the licence fee had not kept up with inflation. Five of the BBC's orchestras were disbanded as part of the cuts, which equated to 153 full-time and 19 part-time jobs. It was a blow to the union, who wanted the members to strike. The union decided to strike and in the seventh week they negotiated terms with the BBC.

Morton retired in 1989 and was succeeded by Dennis Scard.

=== Dennis Scard ===
When Dennis Scard came into the role with the union, he saw that there was an issue with the competition of foreign orchestras taking the jobs as they would accept less wages which promoters were eager to exploit. Scard and other members negotiated with the BBC regarding those that they contracted for work in one of their orchestras.

In 1990 the union had over 40,000 members. Scard concern had been to work on the internal workings of the organisation during his time as general secretary. He was re-elected unopposed in 1994 and 1999, but this was questioned, and the election was held again in 2000 with Derek Kay opposing Scard.

Kay was receiving a lot of support, but Scard had not told anyone that he had been diagnosed with cancer, which meant he had had an operation and was undergoing radiotherapy during the campaign. Kay won the election by just eight votes, the next day Scard put in six complaints against Scard to the London District Disciplinary Committee which set off two years of legal battles between Kay and the union. These legal battles tarnished the union's reputation in the press, Kay was given some compensation for his legal fees, and the position had to go to election once more.

=== John F. Smith ===
John F. Smith won the election for the role of General Secretary in the 2002 election; he prompted a fight for reform against the Licensing Act 2003 as the union believed that it had detrimental effects on musicians wanting to play in bars and pubs. The fight against reform may have taken many years, but in 2012 the Live Music Act mean that amplified gigs of under 200 did not need a licence and unamplified gigs did not have a cap.

In 2013, membership was over 30,000 and the union's main expenditure was still staff wages. 2012 had seen the launch of the Work Not Play campaign to help raise awareness of all the musicians that are asked to play for free.

=== Horace Trubridge ===
Horace Trubridge was elected general secretary on 27 March 2017 for a five-year term ending on 27 March 2022. On 5 February 2020 the union's executive passed a motion extending Trubridge's term without re-election to 15 January 2025, his 68th birthday. A member made a complaint to the Trade Union Certification Officer and a hearing was listed for 18 November. However seven days before the hearing the union rescinded their decision on legal advice from Thompsons Solicitors. The union confirmed that the next election for the role would now go ahead at the end of Trubridge's current term of office on 27 March 2022.

== Other information ==
At a high point in 1932, using Douglas Anderson as the architect and Trollope & Colls as the builders, it had a house built, with grounds of 24 acres and a lake, for retired musicians, now called Merebank House, in what is now Beare Green. The name of the house is recorded on a postcard of the day, as "musicians' convalescent home, Holmwood" – the station 200 yards away is known as Holmwood railway station, and this area was then known as Holmwood. Sir Henry Wood and Lady Wood, and the composer Baron Frédéric Alfred d'Erlanger were among those who attended a ceremony to lay the foundation stone of the musicians' home on 10 June 1932, where the arrival of the Baron was serenaded by 10 trumpeters, 10 trombonists and 10 drummers; musicians were present from the London Philharmonic Orchestra and from the Covent Garden Choir. The Baron used a silver trowel (which was then gifted to him as a souvenir) to lay the home's foundation stone, still present, which bears only his name and the date the stone was laid, making no reference to Sir Henry Wood or to the purpose of the house; the write up of the ceremony to lay the foundation stone that was published in the Leatherhead and Dorking advertiser records that it was planned to build more properties in the grounds, for example a musicians' orphanage, noting that it had taken 10 years from 1922 to 1932, to raise the funds for the site and the first home there. The planning portal of Mole Valley District Council records that permission was applied for in 1948 for three more homes on the site. Later, there was a performance there of Baron Frédéric's opera, Tess, and various other musical performances as recorded in the archives of Dorking museum. Ralph Vaughan-Williams spent time at Leith Hill House, 2 miles away, but no record has yet been uncovered of his visiting the house.

The introduction of "talkie" films reduced opportunities for musicians, and membership fell to a low of 7,000 in 1940. By the 1950s, Merebank House and all land had been sold to Dorking and Horley Rural District Council; the land was used for social housing, and for a village hall. After World War II, it grew again, forming the International Federation of Musicians. It also joined the Confederation of Entertainment Unions and affiliated to the Labour Party.

== Campaigns ==
The MU stages regular campaigns in relation to relevant musical and industrial issues. Recent campaigns have included protests outside theatres, in response to the use of recorded music in shows where live music was advertised, and the anti-Pay to Play campaign, an issue which continues to affect the live music scene, particularly at grassroots level.

Other MU campaigns include:

- Keep Music Live: The union has used the slogan Keep Music Live since 1965.
- Music Supported Here: In December 2009, the MU launched a new campaign, entitled Music Supported Here, which aims to raise both awareness of copyright, and also the distribution and use of music, which, the MU states, should be controllable by the musician.
- Work Not Play: In November 2012 the MU launched a new campaign called "Work Not Play", to raise awareness about the growing trend for artists being asked to perform for free. The campaign has been supported by a number of organisations in the industry including notable industry names such as Skiddle.

== Election results ==
The union sponsored Labour Party candidates in several parliamentary elections.

Election	Constituency	Candidate	Votes	Percentage	Position
1963 by-election	Rotherham	Brian O'Malley	22,411	69.2	1
1964 general election	Rotherham	Brian O'Malley	27,585	66.5	1
1966 general election	Rotherham	Brian O'Malley	27,402	69.7	1
1970 general election	Barry	John Allison	23,286	39.2	2
1970 general election	Rotherham	Brian O'Malley	25,246	66.4	1
1974 Feb general election	Rotherham	Brian O'Malley	27,088	60.0	1
1974 Oct general election	Rotherham	Brian O'Malley	25,874	64.6	1

== General secretaries ==
1893: Joe Williams
1924: E. S. Teale
1931: Fred Dambman
1948: Hardie Ratcliffe
1970: John Morton
1990: Dennis Scard
2000: Derek Kay
2002: John F. Smith
2017: Horace Trubridge
2022: Naomi Pohl
