= John F. Smith (musician) =

British musician (b. 1950)

John Frank Smith OBE is a British musician and trade unionist.

Born in Leicestershire in 1950 and educated at Hinckley Grammar School, he attended the Leicestershire County School of Music and was a member of the Leicestershire Schools Symphony Orchestra from 1963 to 1968. After studying at the Royal Academy of Music in London from 1968 to 1971, where he was the winner of the Sidney Langston Prize for Brass playing and was awarded a Licensiate diploma (LRAM), Smith joined the English National Opera (ENO) orchestra in 1974. He remained there, as Principal Tuba, for almost 20 years. While at ENO he enrolled in the Open University from which he gained a B.Sc. (1st Class Hons) in politics and sociology.

In 1994 he was appointed a full-time official of the Musicians' Union (MU) administering the Union's London District. During this time he continued in adult education gaining an MA in Industrial Relations at Keele University. He was promoted to the post of Assistant General Secretary (Media) in 1997. In this role he was responsible for the MU's collective bargaining agreements with broadcasters and audio and audio-visual producers. This meant that he had the authority to administer the non-assigned performers' rights of MU members. At this time he developed an expertise in performers' rights and has been recognised as an expert in this area by, amongst others, the European Commission. In December 2002. Smith was elected General Secretary of the MU, he retired from this role in July 2017.

In addition to his UK activities, Smith has been President of the International Federation of Musicians (FIM) since 2004, a position that he was re-elected to in June 2025. This role involves representing musicians’ interests in discussions with organisations such as UNESCO, WIPO and the European Parliament and Commission.

Smith has held directorships of the British Copyright Council, UK Music, the Educational Recording Agency. He is a former president of the General Federation of Trade Unions (GFTU). He was a member of the TUC General Council from 2007 to 2017 and a member of the TUC Executive Committee from 2012 to 2017.

Smith was appointed chair of the music licensing company Phonographic Performance Ltd (PPL) with effect from January 2016. standing down from this role on 31 December 2025.

In 2018 he was appointed a Governor of the Royal Society of Musicians, becoming chairman in January 2021.

In January 2018 he was the recipient of an Association of British Orchestras (ABO) Special Award.

Smith was appointed Officer of the Order of the British Empire (OBE) in the 2020 Birthday Honours for services to music.

Trade union offices
| Preceded by Derek Kay | General Secretary of the Musicians' Union; 2003–2017 | Succeeded by Horace Trubridge |
| Preceded by Ben Marshall | President of the General Federation of Trade Unions; 2017–2019 | Succeeded by Oshor Williams |
