= Global Unions =

Global Unions or Council of Global Unions is a website, which is jointly owned and managed by the International Trade Union Confederation (ITUC), the Trade Union Advisory Committee to the OECD, and ten global union federations (GUFs).

== Formation ==
In November 2006, two international union organizations were created, the ITUC and the Council of Global Unions that emerged from a reorganization of the international trade union movement (which was divided because of post-war divisions). ITUC is the result of the breakup of both the WCL and ICFTU for the purposes of uniting under one organisation. The Council of Global Unions was created at the first meeting of ITUC and is a body involving the global union federations which represent their respective sectors at the international trade union level, ITUC, and the Trade Union Advisory Committee to the OECD.

The Council of Global Unions (CGU) held its inaugural meeting in Brussels, 9–10 January 2007. All GUFs, with the exception of the International Metalworkers' Federation, as well as TUAC, became members of the Council and signed the agreement.

== Responsibilities ==
The CGU was created to encourage closer co-operation among global unions in order to act more effectively at the international level to build a more favourable, enabling environment for organising and collective bargaining. Although its work has policy implications, it was not established to make policy. That is the responsibility of the organisations that constitute the CGU.

Although Global Unions are described as 'global', this represents more an "aspiration than a reality since they are more accurately described as international bodies with wide coverage that are 'globalising'". Historically, they have built outwards from their European bases in an attempt to include unions in other regions and are still trying to extend their coverage to every country where unions are found.

== See also ==
- Trade union
- Global union federation
