= Fritz Baade =

German politician and economist

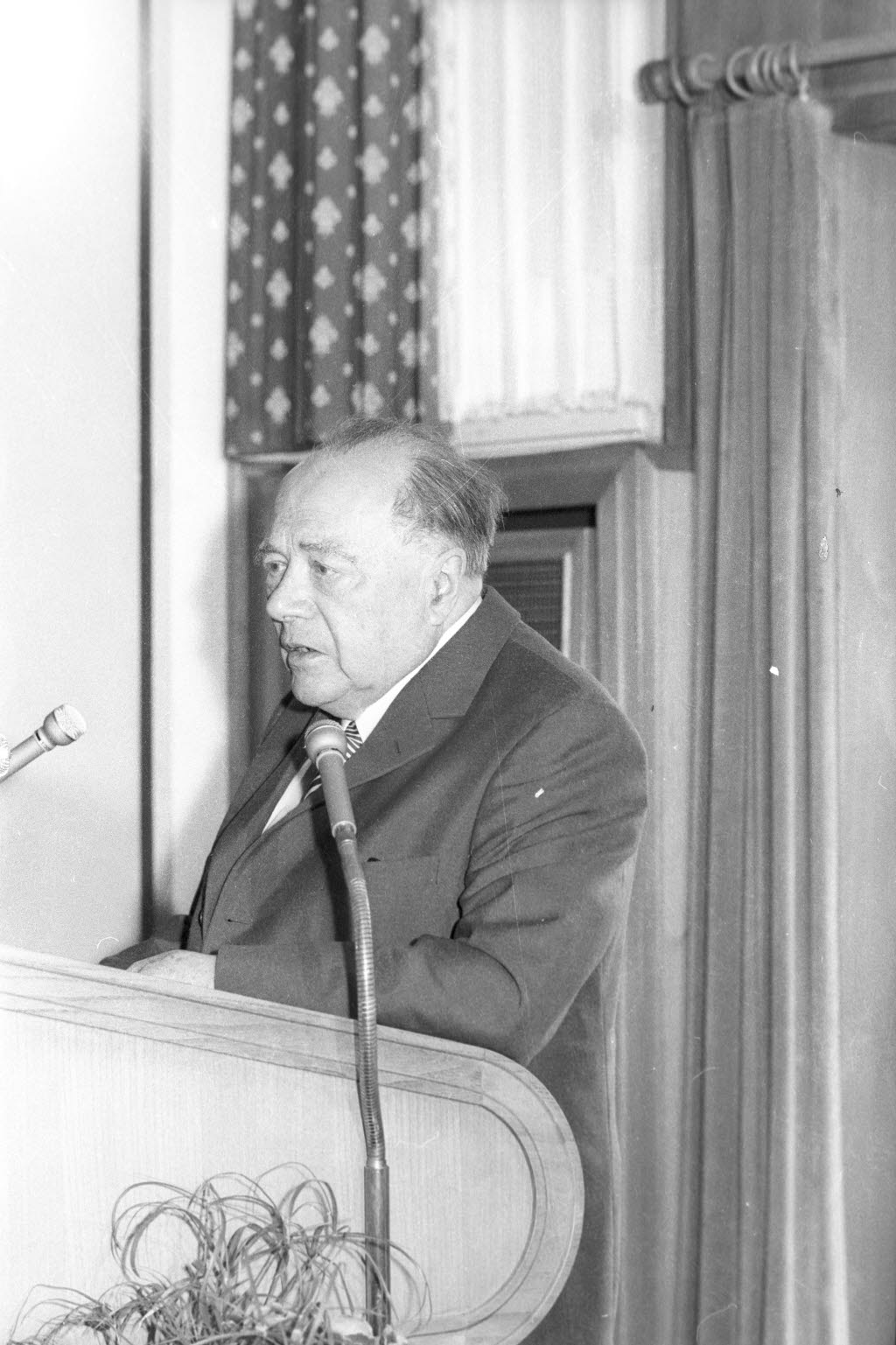
- Baade giving a lecture in 1970

Member of the Bundestag for Schleswig-Holstein
- In office 7 November 1949 – 17 October 1965

Member of the Reichstag for Magdeburg
- In office 13 October 1930 – 22 June 1933

Personal details
- Born: 23 January 1893 Neuruppin
- Died: 15 May 1974 (aged 81)
- Party: SPD

Fritz Baade (23 January 1893 – 15 May 1974) was a German politician of the Social Democratic Party (SPD) and member of the German Bundestag. During the Weimar Republic he was the SPD's expert on agriculture. During the Great Depression he helped promote the WTB plan, a proposed public works program.

== Career ==
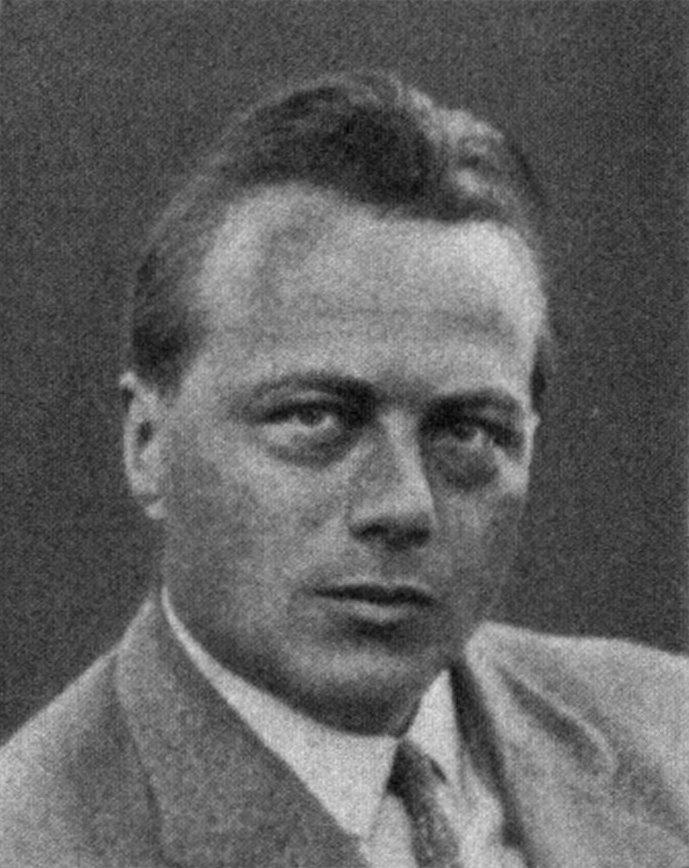
Baade's official Reichstag portrait, 1932

Baade was initially a member of the USPD and, when the party split, joined the moderate wing, which merged with the SPD in 1922. From 1918 to 1919 he was chairman of the Workers' and Soldiers' Council and a city councilor in Essen. From 1930 to 1933 he was a member of the Reichstag as a representative for the Magdeburg constituency.

=== World War II ===
Deprived of his posts and mandate by the Nazis, he emigrated to Turkey in 1935, where he worked as a university lecturer and advisor to the government.

=== Post-war era ===
In April 1948, he received a call to Kiel and headed the Kiel Institute until his retirement in March 1961.

From August 10 to 23, 1948, Baade took part in the Constitutional Convention on Herrenchiemsee as the representative of the state of Schleswig-Holstein. From 1949 to 1965 he was a member of the German Bundestag, where from 1949 to 1953 he was deputy chairman of the Committee on ERP Questions and from 1953 to 1957 he was deputy chairman of the Subcommittee on Cartel Law of the Committee on Food, Agriculture and Forestry. He was initially elected to the Bundestag via the Schleswig-Holstein state list, but in 1961 he was a directly elected representative for the Kiel constituency.

== Literature ==
Herbst, Ludolf; Jahn, Bruno (2002). Vierhaus, Rudolf (ed.). Biographisches Handbuch der Mitglieder des Deutschen Bundestages. 1949–2002 [Biographical Handbook of the Members of the German Bundestag. 1949–2002] (in German). München: De Gruyter - De Gruyter Saur. p. 1715. ISBN 978-3-11-184511-1.
