= International Federation of Musicians =

Global union federation

- Federation Internationale des Musiciens
- Founded: 1948
- Headquarters: 21 bis rue Victor Massé, Paris
- Location: France
- Key people: Benoît Machuel (Gen Sec); John F. Smith (President)
- Affiliations: IAEA
- Website: fim-musicians.org

The International Federation of Musicians (French: Federation Internationale des Musiciens, FIM) is a global union federation bringing together trade unions representing music performers. FIM counts member unions in 70 countries and three regional groups in Europe, Africa and Latin America. It is a member of the Council of Global Unions.

== History ==
The International Federation of Musicians (FIM) was established on August 3,1948, during a conference in Zürich, which had been organized on the initiative of the Swiss Musicians' Union. The conference brought together key figures in the music industry to address musician's rights and the need for international cooperation in protecting these rights. From 1951, it held meetings with the members of the Berne Convention, the International Labour Organization, the IFPI, and the European Broadcasting Union, to negotiate the copyright rights of musicians, establish a strong network among musicians' unions and setting the foundation for its future objectives.

For many years, the secretariat was independent of both the main international federations of trade unions, the International Confederation of Free Trade Unions and the World Federation of Trade Unions, and as such, by the 1980s, it represented both unions in capitalist countries, and in communist countries such as Cuba.

In 1997, the organization affiliated to the International Arts and Entertainment Alliance. The secretariat is currently based in Paris, France.

== Objectives ==
The International Federation of Musicians' main objective is to safeguard and advance the creative, economic, and social rights of musicians as represented by its member unions. This leads to activities such as:

- Development of the worldwide organization of musicians
- International cooperation is advanced by the federation of music unions worldwide
- Supporting legislative and other actions that provide protection on a national and international level on behalf of musicians
- Reaching agreements with other international organizations for the benefit of the profession and member unions
- Acquiring and compiling statistical data and additional information on the music industry, then supplying member unions with this data
- Supporting member unions materially and morally in the interests of the profession and in line with FIM's goals

The World Intellectual Property Organization (WIPO), the International Labor Office (ILO), and UNESCO are among the organizations with whom FIM collaborates with closely. Other initiatives include the holding of international congresses and conferences, the advancement of all efforts to make music the common property of all people, and the upkeep of ongoing relationships with other international organizations that could be of service to FIM.

== Affiliated Unions ==
The following unions were affiliated in March 2022:

| Union | Abbreviation | Country |
|---|---|---|
| American Federation of Musicians | AFM | Canada & United States |
| Argentinian Society of Musicians | SADEM | Argentina |
| Association of Music Professionals of Senegal | AMS | Senegal |
| Association of Uruguayan Musicians | AUDEM | Uruguay |
| Communication Workers' Union | SLC | Italy |
| Creo | Creo | Norway |
| Croatian Musicians' Union | HGU | Croatia |
| Danish Musicians' Union | DMF | Denmark |
| Education, Science and Culture Trade Union of Slovenia | SVIZ | Slovenia |
| Entertainers of Jamaica Association | EJA | Jamaica |
| Federation of Citizens' Services | FSC | Spain |
| Federation of Culture and Media | FAIR-MediaSind | Romania |
| Federation of Dutch Trade Unions | FNV | Netherlands |
| Federation of Uruguayan Musicians | FEDEM | Uruguay |
| Finnish Musicians' Union | SML | Finland |
| General Union of Public Services | ACOD | Belgium |
| German Orchestra Union | DOV | Germany |
| Hungarian Musicians’ and Dancers’ Union | MZTSZ | Hungary |
| Icelandic Musicians' Union | FIH | Iceland |
| Iranian Musicians' Union | IMU | Iran |
| Israeli Musicians' Union | IMU | Israel |
| Kenya Musicians' Union | KEMU | Kenya |
| Latvian Trade Union Federation for People Engaged in Cultural Activities | LKDAF | Latvia |
| Media, Entertainment & Arts Alliance | MEAA | Australia |
| Musicians' Federation of India | MFI | India |
| Musicians' Union | MU | United Kingdom |
| Musicians' Union of Ireland | MUI | Ireland |
| Musicians' Union of Japan | MUJ | Japan |
| Musicians' Union of Liberia | MULIB | Liberia |
| Musicians' Union of Malawi | MUM | Malawi |
| Musicians' Union of the Gambia | MUSIGAM | Gambia |
| Musicians' Union of the Ivory Coast | SAMCI | Cote d'Ivoire |
| Musicians' Union of the State of Rio de Janeiro | SINDMUSI | Brazil |
| National Association of Public and Private Employees | ANEP | Costa Rica |
| National Union of Music Workers | SITMUCH | Chile |
| Ormúsica | Ormúsica | Colombia |
| Panhellenic Musician Union | PMU | Greece |
| Professional Union of Spanish Musicians | SPME | Spain |
| Serbian Musicians' Union | SMU | Serbia |
| SO.ME.SOK | SO.ME.SOK | Cyprus |
| Swedish Musicians' Union | FSM | Sweden |
| Swiss Musicians' Union | SMV-USDAM | Switzerland |
| Syndicat national des artistes-musiciens | SNAM | France |
| SYNEAMAC | SYNEAMAC | Cameroon |
| Togo Musicians' Union | SARIAC | Togo |
| Trade Union for the Music Arts Industry | TUMAI | Zimbabwe |
| Trade Union of Cameroonian Musicians | SYCAMU | Cameroon |
| Trade Union of Polish Artists and Orchestra Musicians | ZZ PAMO | Poland |
| Transcom | Transcom | Belgium |
| Uganda Musicians' Union | UMU | Uganda |
| Ukrainian Musicians' Union | UMU | Ukraine |
| UNIA | UNIA | Slovakia |
| Union Conference of Musicians | GLOSA-SKG | Slovenia |
| Union of Bulgarian Musicians and Dancers | UBMD | Bulgaria |
| Union of Musicians, Composers and Singers of Peru | SIMCCAP | Peru |
| Union of Musicians of Colombia | SIMUCOL | Colombia |
| Union of Music Workers | UTM | Costa Rica |
| Union of Workers in Music, Art and Related Industries | SITMAS | Panama |
| Ver.di | Ver.di | Germany |
| Younion | Younion | Austria |
| Zimbabwe Musicians' Union | ZIMU | Zimbabwe |

== Leadership ==
=== General Secretaries ===
1948: Rudolf Leuzinger
1982: Yvonne Burckhardt
1990s: Jean Vincent
2002-present: Benoît Machuel

=== Presidents ===
1948: William Batten
1950: Hardie Ratcliffe
1973: John Morton
2004-present: John F. Smith
