= Vladimir Voitinsky =

Russian politician and revolutionary

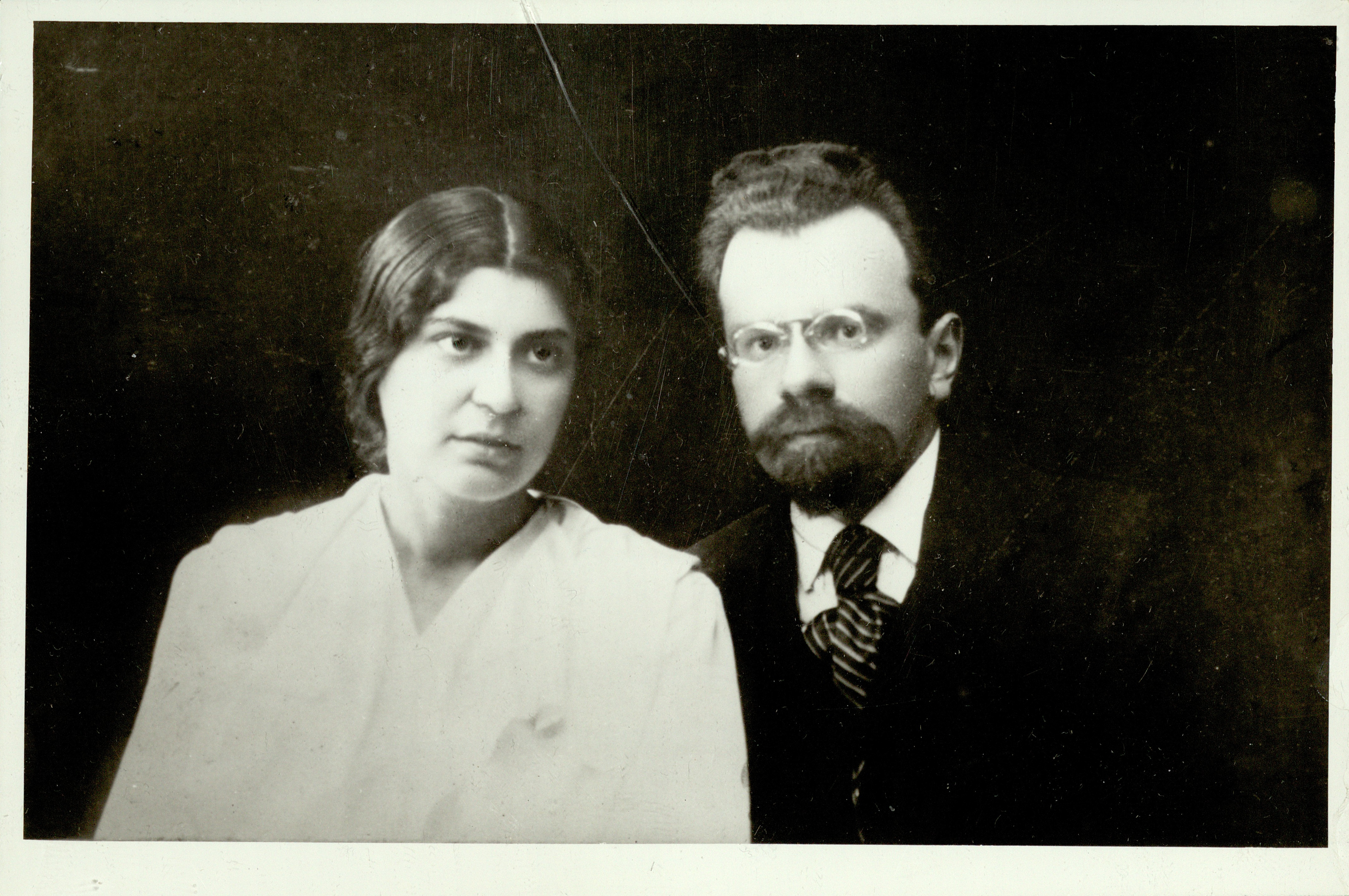
Voitinsky and his wife Emma in Irkutsk, 1916

Vladimir S. Voitinsky (Russian: Владимир Савельевич Войтинский; Vladimir Savelyevich Voitinsky November 12, 1885 – June 11, 1960) was a Russian revolutionary, politician and economist.

Voitinsky was born in St. Petersburg into a literati family, he studied economics there and authored a well-received monograph in 1905. During the Russian Revolution of 1905, Voitinsky joined the Bolshevik wing of the Russian Social Democratic Labour Party. He was arrested by the police and exiled to Siberia. During the World War I years, he became close to the leading Georgian Menshevik Irakli Tsereteli and defected to the more moderate Mensheviks. During the Russian Revolution of 1917, he was a member of the Central Executive Committee of the Soviets, edited the newspaper Izvestia, and served as a commissar at front. During the July Days crisis, Voitinsky was tasked with defending the Tauride Palace from a mob of 50,000 people with just 18 soldiers at his disposal. To do so he relied on deception, placing his men at the windows so the palace would appear to be properly defended.

After the October Revolution, he was briefly arrested and subsequently fled to the newly established Democratic Republic of Georgia, which he represented abroad from 1919 until that republic's fall in 1921. Voitinsky then lived in Germany, working as a researcher for the German Federation of Trade Unions and International Labour Organization. He was briefly prominent on the German left, developing an economic plan to counter the Great Depression. In 1935, Voitinsky left for the United States, where he worked for the Central Statistical Board and Social Security Board. He belonged to the Mensheviks in emigration, but gradually distanced himself from Russian emigration as a whole.

He died on June 11, 1960, in Washington, D.C.

== Bibliography ==
- W.S. Woytinsky and E. S. Woytinsky, Employment and wages in the United States (1943)
- W.S. Woytinsky and E. S. Woytinsky, World Population and Production Trends and Outlooks (1953)
- W.S. Woytinsky World commerce and governments;: Trends and outlook (1955)
- W.S. Woytinsky, Stormy Passage: A Personal History Through Two Russian Revolutions to Democracy and Freedom: 1905-1960 (1961)
