= German Wood Workers' Union =

Former German Reich trade union (1893–1933)

- Deutsche Holzarbeiterverband
- Successor: Industrial Union of Wood (E Germany), Wood and Plastic Union (W Germany)
- Founded: 4 April 1893
- Dissolved: 2 May 1933
- Headquarters: 2 Köllnischen Park, Berlin
- Location: Germany
- Members: 434,843 (1922)
- Publication: Holzarbeiter-Zeitung
- Affiliations: ADGB, IFWW

The German Wood Workers' Union (German: Deutsche Holzarbeiterverband, DHV) was a trade union representing carpenters, joiners, and related workers, in Germany.

The union was founded in April 1893, at a meeting in Kassel. The meeting merged the German Carpenters' Union, the German Union of Joiners, and the Union of German Wheelwrights, the Union of Woodturners in Germany, and the Central Union of Workers in the Sweep and Brush Industry in Germany. It initially had 23,774 members, but grew rapidly, absorbing the union of basket makers in 1896, the machine and cork workers in 1899, the Union of Gilders in 1906, the German Umbrella Makers' Union in 1910 and the Central Union of Carvers in 1919. That year, it was a founding affiliate of the General German Trade Union Confederation.

In 1922, membership peaked, at 434,843. By this point, the union was divided into 15 districts, each with two full-time leaders. It then fell slightly, but was still 315,155 in 1929. By this time, it represented members in the following trades:

Trade	Members
Carpenters	156,189
Machine workers	28,866
Musical instrument makers	15,832
Furniture workers	5,157
Polishers and stainers	10,552
Carvers	2,357
Wood turners	4,092
Model carpenters	8,949
Boat builders and ships' carpenters	2,917
Cartographers	9,409
Box makers	5,137
Parquet layers	1,059
Brush makers	6,567
Stick and umbrella makers	1,792
Basket makers	3,074
Cork workers	620
Gilders	2,203
Button makers	3,371
Comb makers	1,407
Pencil makers	2,499
Clog makers	263
Shoe last workers	1,018
Sawmill workers	27,953
Other trades	13,902

In 1933, the union was banned by the Nazis.

== Presidents ==
1893: Karl Kloß
1908: Theodor Leipart
1919: Adam Neumann
1920: Fritz Tarnow
