= General Workers' Union of Yugoslavia =

Yugoslavian general union

The General Workers' Union of Yugoslavia (Serbo-Croatian: Opšteg radničkog saveza, ORS) was a general union in Yugoslavia.

The union was founded in 1917, when trade union activity was re-legalised in Yugoslavia. In its early years, it led significant industrial actions, including a general strike in 1919. The leadership of the Yugoslav Social-Democratic Party became concerned about communist activity in the union, and so organised the Cartel of Professional Organisations, which separated the industries with the most militant workers from the main body of the ORS.

In 1925, it affiliated to the United Federation of Workers' Unions of Yugoslavia, although it left again in 1930, due to disagreements on the leadership of the movement. It was banned in 1939.
