= List of members of the Federal Assembly from the Canton of Zürich =

Coat of Arms

This is a list of members of both houses of the Federal Assembly from the Canton of Zürich.

== Members of the Council of States ==
Councillor (Party)	Election	Councillor (Party)
Jonas Furrer; Liberal Party; 1848–1848	Appointed	Johann Jakob Rüttimann; Liberal Party; 1848–1854
Johann-Kaspar Ammann; Liberal Party; 1849–1849	Appointed	Johann Jakob Rüttimann; Liberal Party; 1848–1854
H. Jakob Pestalozzi; Liberal Party; 1849–1863	Appointed	
H. Jakob Pestalozzi; Liberal Party; 1849–1863	Appointed	Jakob Dubs; Liberal Party; 1854–1862
H. Jakob Pestalozzi; Liberal Party; 1849–1863	Appointed	Johann Jakob Rüttimann; Liberal Party; 1862–1869
Eugen Escher; Liberal Party; 1863–1869	Appointed	Johann Jakob Rüttimann; Liberal Party; 1862–1869
Eugen Escher; Liberal Party; 1863–1869	Appointed	Johann Heinrich Boller; Liberal Party; 1872–1875
Johann Kaspar Hug; Swiss Democrats; 1869–1872	Appointed	Johann Jakob Sulzer; Swiss Democrats; 1869–1878
Hans Rudolf Zangger; Swiss Democrats; 1875–1878	Appointed	Johann Jakob Sulzer; Swiss Democrats; 1869–1878
Friedrich Wilhelm Hertenstein; Liberal Party; 1878–1879	Appointed	Heinrich P. Rieter; Liberal Party; 1878–1889
Walter Hauser; Swiss Democrats; 1879–1888	Appointed	Heinrich P. Rieter; Liberal Party; 1878–1889
Jakob J. Pfenninger; Swiss Democrats; 1889–1891	Appointed	Heinrich P. Rieter; Liberal Party; 1878–1889
Jakob J. Pfenninger; Swiss Democrats; 1889–1891	Appointed	Othmar Blumer; Free Democratic Party; 1890–1900
Johannes Stössel; Free Democratic Party; 1891–1905	Appointed	Othmar Blumer; Free Democratic Party; 1890–1900
Johannes Stössel; Free Democratic Party; 1891–1905	Appointed	Paul K. E. Usteri; Free Democratic Party; 1900–1922
Joh. Albert Locher; Free Democratic Party; 1905–1914	Appointed	Paul K. E. Usteri; Free Democratic Party; 1900–1922
Oskar Wettstein; Free Democratic Party; 1914–1939	Appointed	Paul K. E. Usteri; Free Democratic Party; 1900–1922
Oskar Wettstein; Free Democratic Party; 1914–1939	Appointed	Gustav Keller; Free Democratic Party; 1922–1930
Oskar Wettstein; Free Democratic Party; 1914–1939	Appointed	Emil Klöti; Social Democratic Party; 1930–1955
Hans Bernhard; Paysans, Artisans et Bourgeois; 1940–1942	Appointed	Emil Klöti; Social Democratic Party; 1930–1955
Friedrich Traugott Wahlen; Paysans, Artisans et Bourgeois; 1942–1949	Appointed	Emil Klöti; Social Democratic Party; 1930–1955
Gottlieb Duttweiler; Alliance of Independents; 1949–1951	Appointed	Emil Klöti; Social Democratic Party; 1930–1955
Ernst Vaterlaus; Free Democratic Party; 1951–1963	1951	Emil Klöti; Social Democratic Party; 1930–1955
Ernst Vaterlaus; Free Democratic Party; 1951–1963	1955	Willy Spühler; Social Democratic Party; 1955–1959
Ernst Vaterlaus; Free Democratic Party; 1951–1963	1959	Willy Spühler; Social Democratic Party; 1955–1959
Ernst Vaterlaus; Free Democratic Party; 1951–1963	1960	Rudolf Meier; Paysans, Artisans et Bourgeois; 1960–1967
Eduard Zellweger; Social Democratic Party; 1963–1967	1963	Rudolf Meier; Paysans, Artisans et Bourgeois; 1960–1967
Albin Heimann; Alliance of Independents; 1967–1979	1967	Fritz Honegger; Free Democratic Party; 1967–1977
Albin Heimann; Alliance of Independents; 1967–1979	1971	Fritz Honegger; Free Democratic Party; 1967–1977
Albin Heimann; Alliance of Independents; 1967–1979	1975	Fritz Honegger; Free Democratic Party; 1967–1977
Albin Heimann; Alliance of Independents; 1967–1979	1978	Emilie Lieberherr; Social Democratic Party; 1978–1983
Jakob Stucki; Swiss People's Party; 1979–1987	1979	Emilie Lieberherr; Social Democratic Party; 1978–1983
Jakob Stucki; Swiss People's Party; 1979–1987	1983	Riccardo Jagmetti; Free Democratic Party; 1983–1995
Monika Weber; Alliance of Independents; 1987–1998	1987	Riccardo Jagmetti; Free Democratic Party; 1983–1995
Monika Weber; Alliance of Independents; 1987–1998	1991	Riccardo Jagmetti; Free Democratic Party; 1983–1995
Monika Weber; Alliance of Independents; 1987–1998	1995	Riccardo Jagmetti; Free Democratic Party; 1983–1995
Monika Weber; Alliance of Independents; 1987–1998	1996	Vreni Spoerry; Free Democratic Party; 1996–2003
Hans Hofmann; Swiss People's Party; 1998–2007	1998	Vreni Spoerry; Free Democratic Party; 1996–2003
Hans Hofmann; Swiss People's Party; 1998–2007	1999	Vreni Spoerry; Free Democratic Party; 1996–2003
Hans Hofmann; Swiss People's Party; 1998–2007	2003	Trix Heberlein; Free Democratic Party; 2003–2007
Verena Diener Lenz; Green Liberal Party; 2007–2015	2007	Felix Gutzwiller; Free Democratic Party; 2007–2009; FDP.The Liberals; 2009–2015
Verena Diener Lenz; Green Liberal Party; 2007–2015	2009	Felix Gutzwiller; Free Democratic Party; 2007–2009; FDP.The Liberals; 2009–2015
Verena Diener Lenz; Green Liberal Party; 2007–2015	2011	Felix Gutzwiller; Free Democratic Party; 2007–2009; FDP.The Liberals; 2009–2015
Daniel Jositsch; Social Democratic Party; 2015–present	2015	Ruedi Noser; FDP.The Liberals; 2015–2023
Daniel Jositsch; Social Democratic Party; 2015–present	2019	Ruedi Noser; FDP.The Liberals; 2015–2023
Daniel Jositsch; Social Democratic Party; 2015–present	2019	Tiana Angelina Moser; Green Liberal Party; 2023-present

== Members of the National Council ==
Councillor	Party	Term start	Term end
Rudolf Benz	Liberal	1848	1869
H. Rudolf Bollier	Liberal	1848	1849
J. H. Alfred Escher	Liberal	1848	1882
Heinrich Homberger	Liberal	1848	1851
Hans Heinrich Hürlimann	Liberal	1848	1851
Joh. Jakob Müller	FDP/PRD	1848	1851
Heinrich Rüegg	Liberal	1848	1863
Georg Joseph Sidler	Liberal	1848	1861
Felix Weidmann	Liberal	1848	1849
Johann Jakob Wieland	Liberal	1848	1848
Johannes Wild	Liberal	1848	1849
Paul Karl Eduard Ziegler	Conservative	1848	1855
Jakob Dubs	Liberal	1849	1854
Karl Adolf Huber	Liberal	1849	1863
Joh. Jakob Ryffel	Liberal	1849	1857
Hermann M. Stadtmann	Liberal	1849	1862
Benjamin Brändli	Liberal	1851	1854
Rudolf Fr. Wäffler	Liberal	1851	1866
J. Heinrich Zangger	Liberal	1851	1863
Johann Jakob Treichler	Liberal	1852	1869
Heinrich Hüni	Liberal	1854	1860
Heinrich J. Fierz	Liberal	1855	1874
Ulrich sen. Meister	Liberal	1856	1866
Johann Jakob Bucher	Liberal	1857	1866
Paul Karl Eduard Ziegler	Conservative	1860	1866
Johann Stapfer	Liberal	1861	1863
Joh. Heinrich Grunholzer	FDP/PRD	1863	1869
Heinrich Honegger	Liberal	1863	1869
J. Eduard Suter	Liberal	1863	1872
Joh. Jakob Widmer	Liberal	1863	1879
Johann Stapfer	Liberal	1864	1866
Joh. Jakob Fehr	SD/DS	1866	1875
Friedrich Erhard Scheuchzer	SD/DS	1866	1895
Johann Jakob Sulzer	SD/DS	1866	1869
Hans Rudolf Zangger	SD/DS	1866	1875
Rudolf Stehli	Liberal	1867	1869
Salomon Bleuler	Grut*	1869	1884
Walter Hauser	SD/DS	1869	1875
Johann Jakob Keller	SD/DS	1869	1893
Johann Jakob Scherer	SD/DS	1869	1872
Johann Jakob Spörri	SD/DS	1869	1871
Eugen Escher	Liberal	1870	1871
Johann Jakob Schäppi	FDP/PRD	1871	1872
Gottlieb Ziegler	SD/DS	1871	1877
Friedrich Wilhelm Hertenstein	Liberal	1872	1878
Melchior Römer	Liberal	1872	1887
Heinrich Studer	Liberal	1872	1878
H. Jakob Albrecht	Liberal	1873	1874
Joh. Jakob Hasler	Liberal	1874	1880
Johann Ludwig Forrer	SD/DS	1875	1875
Johannes Moser	SD/DS	1875	1899
Fr. Salomon Vögelin	SD/DS	1875	1888
Rudolf Zinggeler	SD/DS	1875	1878
Johann Ludwig Forrer	SD/DS	1876	1878
Heinrich Bosshard	Liberal	1877	1878
Johann Kaspar Baumann	Liberal	1878	1884
Heinrich Landis	Liberal	1878	1890
Johannes K. Ryf	Liberal	1878	1884
Johannes Stössel	SD/DS	1878	1891
Jakob J. Pfenninger	SD/DS	1879	1881
Johann Jakob Sulzer	SD/DS	1879	1890
Jakob Brennwald	Liberal	1881	1887
Joh. Heinrich Bühler	Liberal	1881	1893
Johann Ludwig Forrer	SD/DS	1881	1900
Ulrich jun. Meister	Liberal	1882	1890
Konrad H. Cramer	Liberal	1883	1900
Rudolf Geilinger	SD/DS	1884	1911
Arnold Syfrig	SD/DS	1884	1890
Johann Jakob Schäppi	FDP/PRD	1885	1899
Johann Jakob Abegg	Liberal	1887	1912
Arnold Bürkli	Liberal	1888	1892
Joh. Albert Locher	SD/DS	1888	1893
Johannes Eschmann	Liberal	1890	1896
Hans K. Pestalozzi	Liberal	1890	1905
Heinrich Steinemann	FDP/PRD	1890	1902
Jakob J. Vogelsanger	SP/PS	1890	1905
Albert Kündig	FDP/PRD	1891	1908
Ulrich jun. Meister	Liberal	1892	1911
Heinrich Hess	FDP/PRD	1893	1919
Hans Wunderli	LPS/PLS	1893	1899
Emil H. Stadler	FDP/PRD	1894	1910
Heinrich Kern	FDP/PRD	1895	1902
Johann Jakob Amsler	FDP/PRD	1896	1908
Heinrich Berchtold	Liberal	1896	1907
Johann-Rudolf Amsler	SD/DS	1899	1917
Joh. Konrad Hörni	FDP/PRD	1899	1919
Emil J. J. Zürcher	FDP/PRD	1899	1919
Alfred Frey	FDP/PRD	1900	1924
Eduard Sulzer	FDP/PRD	1900	1913
Friedrich Fritschi	SD/DS	1902	1919
Hermann Greulich	SP/PS	1902	1905
Jakob Heinrich Hauser	FDP/PRD	1902	1905
Friedrich Hartmann Studer	Grut&PS*	1902	1905
Albert Studler	Liberal	1902	1910
Jakob Walder	FDP/PRD	1902	1915
Samuel Wanner	FDP/PRD	1902	1911
Joh. Walter Bissegger	FDP/PRD	1905	1915
Theodor Frey	FDP/PRD	1905	1911
Jakob Lutz	FDP/PRD	1905	1919
K. Friedrich Ottiker	FDP/PRD	1905	1917
David Ringger	SD/DS	1905	1922
Karl Aug. Koller	FDP/PRD	1907	1919
Hermann Greulich	SP/PS	1908	1925
Friedrich Hartmann Studer	Grut&PS*	1908	1920
Julius Guyer	FDP/PRD	1910	1917
Joh. Jakob Hauser	FDP/PRD	1910	1913
Robert Billeter	FDP/PRD	1911	1917
Robert Grimm	SP/PS	1911	1919
Paul B. Pflüger	Grut&PS*	1911	1917
Robert Seidel	SP/PS	1911	1917
Johannes F. O. Sigg	SP/PS	1911	1916
Hans Sträuli	FDP/PRD	1911	1934
Werner J. Weber	FDP/PRD	1911	1912
Theodor Odinga	FDP/PRD	1912	1931
Emil R. Rellstab	FDP/PRD	1912	1922
Hans Schenkel	SP/PS	1913	1917
Robert Schmid	FDP/PRD	1913	1919
Friedrich Bopp	SD/DS	1915	1928
Albert Meyer	FDP/PRD	1915	1929
Anton Rimathé	SP/PS	1916	1919
Carl Bertschinger	FDP/PRD	1917	1935
Hans C. Conzett	SP/PS	1917	1918
Emil Hardmeier	FDP/PRD	1917	1935
Fritz Platten	SP/PS	1917	1919
Carl J. Sulzer	FDP/PRD	1917	1934
John Syz	FDP/PRD	1917	1919
Georg Baumberger	Conservative	1919	1931
Hans Enderli	Grut&PS*	1919	1922
Georg E. Forster	SP/PS	1919	1922
Ferdinand Frank	SP/PS	1919	1935
Hans Hoppeler	EVP/PEV	1919	1939
E. Jakob Kägi	SP/PS	1919	1950
Emil Klöti	SP/PS	1919	1930
Ernst Nobs	SP/PS	1919	1943
Eduard Schäubli	SP/PS	1919	1922
Hans Schenkel	SP/PS	1919	1926
Karl Stoll	FDP/PRD	1919	1924
Ernst Tobler	PAB	1919	1928
Hans Wirz	SP/PS	1919	1919
Karl J. Wunderli	PAB	1919	1925
Fritz Platten	Communist	1920	1922
Heinrich Baumann	FDP/PRD	1922	1929
Diethelm Burkhard	PAB	1922	1926
David Farbstein	SP/PS	1922	1938
Jakob Oehninger	PAB	1922	1943
Rudolf Streuli	PAB	1922	1929
Robert Weber	SP/PS	1922	1943
Robert Wirz	SP/PS	1922	1930
August Peter	FDP/PRD	1924	1928
Heinrich-Julius Weisflog	FDP/PRD	1924	1925
Fritz Beck	Communist	1925	1928
Hans Oprecht	SP/PS	1925	1963
Philipp Schmid-Ruedin	FDP/PRD	1925	1963
Johannes F. O. Sigg	SP/PS	1925	1928
Jean Briner	SP/PS	1926	1939
Karl J. Wunderli	PAB	1926	1943
Adolf Gasser	SP/PS	1928	1935
Emil Heller	PAB	1928	1935
Otto Pfister	SP/PS	1928	1939
Heinrich-Julius Weisflog	FDP/PRD	1928	1931
Bernhard Widmer	Conservative	1928	1947
Rudolf Reichling	PAB	1929	1963
Ernst Wetter	FDP/PRD	1929	1938
Heinrich Bräm	SP/PS	1930	1933
Hermann Häberlin	FDP/PRD	1930	1935
Ernst Moser	SP/PS	1930	1947
Robert Müller	Communist	1931	1936
Wilhelm Otto Pfleghard	FDP/PRD	1931	1931
Ludwig Schneller	Conservative	1931	1936
Emil Stadler	FDP/PRD	1931	1935
Robert Strässle	FDP/PRD	1931	1939
Emil Heinrich Furrer	SP/PS	1933	1935
Oskar August Gattiker	FDP/PRD	1934	1935
Hans Kern	FDP/PRD	1934	1935
Franklin Bircher	LDU/LdI	1935	1938
Theodor Gut	FDP/PRD	1935	1946
Paul Gysler	PAB	1935	1959
Paul Meierhans	SP/PS	1935	1950
Willy Stäubli	LDU/LdI	1935	1943
Robert Tobler	National Front	1935	1939
Hans-Gottlieb Widmer	FDP/PRD	1935	1939
Fritz-Charles Wüthrich	LDU/LdI	1935	1939
Balthasar Zimmermann	LDU/LdI	1935	1937
Emil Buomberger	Conservative	1936	1939
Ernst Walter	Communist	1936	1938
Johann Vögtle	LDU/LdI	1937	1939
Jules Humbert-Droz	Communist	1938	1939
Willy Spühler	SP/PS	1938	1955
Hermann Walder	LDU/LdI	1938	1943
Ferdinand Aeschbacher	SP/PS	1939	1940
Gottlieb Bachmann	FDP/PRD	1939	1943
Alfred Büchi	LDU/LdI	1939	1943
Konrad Bürgi	Conservative	1939	1943
Kurt RU Düby	SP/PS	1939	1939
Emil Frei	SP/PS	1939	1963
Oskar August Gattiker	FDP/PRD	1939	1943
Emil Graf	PAB	1939	1947
Hermann Leuenberger	SP/PS	1939	1971
Albert Maag	FDP/PRD	1939	1946
Armin Meili	FDP/PRD	1939	1955
Jean Briner	SP/PS	1940	1943
Felix Moeschlin	LDU/LdI	1941	1947
Kurt RU Düby	SP/PS	1943	1946
Gottlieb Duttweiler	LDU/LdI	1943	1949
Hermann Häberlin	FDP/PRD	1943	1963
Josef Henggeler	SP/PS	1943	1947
Rudolf Meier	PAB	1943	1951
Hans Munz	LDU/LdI	1943	1963
Hans Sappeur	LDU/LdI	1943	1951
Heinrich Schnyder	LDU/LdI	1943	1947
Walter Seiler	Conservative	1943	1959
Ernst Stiefel	PAB	1943	1947
Erwin Stirnemann	FDP/PRD	1943	1946
Walther Trüb	LDU/LdI	1943	1959
Jacques Uhlmann	SP/PS	1943	1951
Eduard Zellweger	SP/PS	1943	1945
Paul Zigerli	EVP/PEV	1943	1956
Valentin Gitermann	SP/PS	1944	1965
Werner Stocker	SP/PS	1945	1946
Robert Bühler	FDP/PRD	1946	1955
Hermann Oldani	SP/PS	1946	1947
Hans Rüegg	SD/DS	1946	1951
Hans Ulrich Schlaepfer	FDP/PRD	1946	1947
Paul Steinmann	SP/PS	1946	1947
Max Brunner	FDP/PRD	1947	1951
Rudolf Bucher	LDU/LdI	1947	1950
Emil Duft	Conservative	1947	1967
Hermann Farner	PAB	1947	1955
Erwin Jaeckle	LDU/LdI	1947	1962
Konrad Müller	Conservative	1947	1951
Werner Schmid	LDU/LdI	1947	1951
Otto Schütz	SP/PS	1947	1975
Alfred Stähli	SP/PS	1947	1947
Edgar Woog	PdA/PST	1947	1955
Alois Grendelmeier	LDU/LdI	1949	1963
Hermann Oldani	SP/PS	1950	1953
Paul Steinmann	SP/PS	1950	1963
William Vontobel	LDU/LdI	1950	1973
Max Arnold	SP/PS	1951	1971
Heinrich Brändli	PAB	1951	1967
Willy Bretscher	FDP/PRD	1951	1967
Traugott Büchi	FDP/PRD	1951	1961
Hans Conzett	PAB	1951	1971
Karl Hackhofer	Conservative	1951	1971
Paul Hauser	SD/DS	1951	1966
Walter König	LDU/LdI	1951	1955
Jacques Uhlmann	SP/PS	1953	1955
Erwin Akeret	PAB	1955	1983
Gallus Berger	SP/PS	1955	1971
Franz Egger	SP/PS	1955	1959
Ulrich Meyer-Boller	FDP/PRD	1955	1971
Rudolf Schmid-Käser	LDU/LdI	1955	1959
Adelrich Jacob Schuler	Conservative	1955	1975
Eduard Zellweger	SP/PS	1955	1956
Willy Sauser	EVP/PEV	1956	1978
Rudolf Welter	SP/PS	1956	1979
Robert Bühler	FDP/PRD	1959	1967
Anton Heil	CCS	1959	1969
Walter König	LDU/LdI	1959	1979
Ernst Schmid	EVP/PEV	1959	1968
Walter Siegmann	PAB	1959	1963
Walter Raissig	FDP/PRD	1961	1975
Werner Schmid	LDU/LdI	1962	1971
Arthur Bachmann	SP/PS	1963	1967
Robert Eibel	FDP/PRD	1963	1975
Paul Eisenring	CCS	1963	1991
Ulrich Götsch	SP/PS	1963	1971
Ernst Gugerli	PAB	1963	1975
Arnold Meier-Ragg	SD/DS	1963	1964
Robert Meyer	SP/PS	1963	1967
Albert Mossdorf	FDP/PRD	1963	1967
Rudolf Suter	LDU/LdI	1963	1979
Jakob Vollenweider	PAB	1963	1975
Ernst Weber	SP/PS	1963	1971
Sigmund Widmer	LDU/LdI	1963	1966
Marcel Beck	SD/DS	1965	1967
Erwin Lang	SP/PS	1965	1967
Karl Ketterer	LDU/LdI	1966	1975
Rudolf Ott	SD/DS	1966	1970
Walter Biel	LDU/LdI	1967	1991
Ernst Bieri	FDP/PRD	1967	1971
Max Bill	LDU/LdI	1967	1971
Otto Bretscher	PAB	1967	1979
Theodor Gut	FDP/PRD	1967	1979
Theodor Kloter	LDU/LdI	1967	1971
Walter Renschler	SP/PS	1967	1987
James Schwarzenbach	N	1967	1979
Fritz Tanner	LDU/LdI	1967	1974
Heinrich Schalcher	EVP/PEV	1968	1983
Kurt von Arx	CCS	1969	1972
Marcel Hotz	SD/DS	1970	1971
Walter Bräm	N	1971	1975
Ezio Canonica	SP/PS	1971	1978
Fritz Ganz	SP/PS	1971	1983
Hans-Ulrich Graf	0	1971	1991
Hans Künzi	FDP/PRD	1971	1987
Hedi Lang-Gehri	SP/PS	1971	1983
Werner F. Leutenegger	SVP/UDC	1971	1977
Heinrich C. Müller	N	1971	1977
Otto Nauer	SP/PS	1971	1987
Werner Reich	N	1971	1975
Martha Ribi	FDP/PRD	1971	1983
Hans Rüegg	FDP/PRD	1971	1983
Lilian Uchtenhagen	SP/PS	1971	1991
Helen Meyer	CVP/PDC	1972	1978
Theodor Kloter	LDU/LdI	1973	1983
Sigmund Widmer	LDU/LdI	1974	1991
Max Arnold	SP/PS	1975	1975
Ulrich Bremi-Forrer	FDP/PRD	1975	1991
Gion Condrau	CVP/PDC	1975	1979
Albert Eggli	SP/PS	1975	1987
Rudolf Friedrich	FDP/PRD	1975	1982
Doris Morf	SP/PS	1975	1989
Josef Nigg	CVP/PDC	1975	1975
Rudolf jun. Reichling	SVP/UDC	1975	1991
Meinrad Schär	LDU/LdI	1975	1982
Rolf Seiler	CVP/PDC	1975	1995
Albert Sigrist	FDP/PRD	1975	1979
Konrad Basler	SVP/UDC	1977	1991
Fritz Meier	0	1977	1991
Hansjörg Braunschweig	SP/PS	1978	1990
Josef Landolt	CVP/PDC	1978	1987
Hans Oester	EVP/PEV	1978	1990
Alfred Affolter	SP/PS	1979	1983
Heinz Allenspach	FDP/PRD	1979	1995
Franz Baumgartner	N	1979	1979
Christoph Blocher	SVP/UDC	1979	1995
Silvio de Capitani	FDP/PRD	1979	1983
Andreas Herczog	POCH	1979	1995
Ernst Huggenberger	CVP/PDC	1979	1983
Elisabeth Kopp	FDP/PRD	1979	1984
Moritz Leuenberger	SP/PS	1979	1995
Hans-Georg Lüchinger	FDP/PRD	1979	1987
Monika Weber	LDU/LdI	1982	1987
Ernst Cincera	FDP/PRD	1983	1995
Max Dünki	EVP/PEV	1983	1995
Verena Grendelmeier	LDU/LdI	1983	1995
Jean-Jacques Hegg	AN	1983	1985
Arnold Müller	LDU/LdI	1983	1987
Willi Neuenschwander	SVP/UDC	1983	1995
Richard Reich	FDP/PRD	1983	1991
Peter Spälti	FDP/PRD	1983	1991
Vreni Spoerry	FDP/PRD	1983	1995
Sepp Stappung	SP/PS	1983	1991
Kurt Müller	FDP/PRD	1984	1991
Hans Steffen	AN	1985	1995
Verena Diener	GPS/PES	1987	1995
Michael E. Dreher	0	1987	1995
Walter Frey	SVP/UDC	1987	1995
Elmar Ledergerber	SP/PS	1987	1995
Hans Meier	GPS/PES	1987	1995
Lili Nabholz	FDP/PRD	1987	1995
Monika Stocker-Meier	GPS/PES	1987	1991
Roland Wiederkehr	LDU/LdI	1987	1995
Barbara Haering Binder	SP/PS	1990	1995
Niklaus Kuhn	EVP/PEV	1990	1991
Peter Baumberger	CVP/PDC	1991	1995
Max Binder	SVP/UDC	1991	1995
Hardi Bischof	SD/DS	1991	1995
Toni Bortoluzzi	SVP/UDC	1991	1995
Lisbeth Fehr	SVP/UDC	1991	1995
Oscar Fritschi	FDP/PRD	1991	1995
Christine Goll	FraP!	1991	1995
Andreas Gross	SP/PS	1991	1995
Trix Heberlein	FDP/PRD	1991	1995
Rolf Hegetschweiler	FDP/PRD	1991	1995
Armin Kern	0	1991	1995
Ursula Leemann	SP/PS	1991	1995
Ueli Maurer	SVP/UDC	1991	1995
Ernst Sieber	EVP/PEV	1991	1995
Hans Steiger	SP/PS	1991	1995
Werner Vetterli	SVP/UDC	1991	1995
Regine Aeppli Wartmann	SP/PS	1995	2003
Peter Baumberger	CVP/PDC	1995	1999
Max Binder	SVP/UDC	1995	2015
Christoph Blocher	SVP/UDC	1995	2003
Toni Bortoluzzi	SVP/UDC	1995	2015
Verena Diener	GPS/PES	1995	1998
Michael E. Dreher	0	1995	1999
Max Dünki	EVP/PEV	1995	1999
Lisbeth Fehr	SVP/UDC	1995	2003
Hans Fehr	SVP/UDC	1995	2015
Walter Frey	SVP/UDC	1995	2001
Oscar Fritschi	FDP/PRD	1995	1999
Christine Goll	FraP!	1995	2011
Verena Grendelmeier	LDU/LdI	1995	1999
Andreas Gross	SP/PS	1995	2015
Barbara Haering Binder	SP/PS	1995	2007
Trix Heberlein	FDP/PRD	1995	2003
Rolf Hegetschweiler	FDP/PRD	1995	2007
Andreas Herczog	SP/PS	1995	1999
Vreni Hubmann	SP/PS	1995	2007
Elmar Ledergerber	SP/PS	1995	1998
Ursula Leemann	SP/PS	1995	1999
Ueli Maurer	SVP/UDC	1995	2008
Hans Meier	GPS/PES	1995	1999
Erich Müller	FDP/PRD	1995	2003
Vreni Müller-Hemmi	SP/PS	1995	2007
Lili Nabholz	FDP/PRD	1995	2003
Ulrich Schlüer	SVP/UDC	1995	2003
Vreni Spoerry	FDP/PRD	1995	1996
Hans Steffen	SD/DS	1995	1999
Anita Thanei	SP/PS	1995	2011
Werner Vetterli	SVP/UDC	1995	1999
Roland Wiederkehr	LDU/LdI	1995	2003
Rosmarie Zapfl	CVP/PDC	1995	2006
Walter Bosshard	FDP/PRD	1996	2003
Jacqueline Fehr	SP/PS	1998	2015
Ruth Genner	GPS/PES	1998	2008
Ruedi Aeschbacher	EVP/PEV	1999	2010
Mario Fehr	SP/PS	1999	2011
Felix Gutzwiller	FDP/PRD	1999	2007
Hans Kaufmann	SVP/UDC	1999	2007
Robert Keller	SVP/UDC	1999	2007
Ursula Koch	SP/PS	1999	2000
Christoph Mörgeli	SVP/UDC	1999	2015
Kathy Riklin	CVP/PDC	1999	2007
Anton Schaller	LDU/LdI	1999	1999
Jürg Stahl	SVP/UDC	1999	2015
Bruno Zuppiger	SVP/UDC	1999	2012
Barbara Marty Kälin	SP/PS	2000	2007
Ernst Schibli	SVP/UDC	2001	2015
Martin Bäumle	GPS/PES	2003	Incumbent
Chantal Galladé	SP/PS	2003	2023
Markus Hutter	FDP/PRD	2003	2014
Filippo Leutenegger	FDP/PRD	2003	2014
Ruedi Noser	FDP/PRD	2003	2015
Ulrich Schlüer	SVP/UDC	2003	2007
Daniel Vischer	GPS/PES	2003	2015
Markus Wäfler	EDU/UDF	2003	2007
Hans Rutschmann	SVP/UDC	2004	2011
Urs Hany	CVP/PDC	2006	2011
Marlies Bänziger	GPS/PES	2007	2011
Verena Diener	GLP/PVL	2007	2007
Doris Fiala	FDP/PRD	2007	2023
Bastien Girod	GPS/PES	2007	Incumbent
Alfred Heer	SVP/UDC	2007	2011
Daniel Jositsch	SP/PS	2007	2015
Hans Kaufmann	SVP/UDC	2007	2014
Tiana Angelina Moser	GLP/PVL	2007	Incumbent
Natalie Rickli	SVP/UDC	2007	2023
Kathy Riklin	CVP/PDC	2007	2023
Barbara Schmid-Federer	CVP/PDC	2007	2018
Thomas Weibel	GLP/PVL	2007	2023
Katharina Prelicz-Huber	GPS/PES	2008	2011
Ulrich Schlüer	SVP/UDC	2009	2011
Maja Ingold	EVP/PEV	2010	2017
Jacqueline Badran	SP/PS	2011	Incumbent
Christoph Blocher	SVP/UDC	2011	2014
Hans Egloff	SVP/UDC	2011	2023
Balthasar Glättli	GPS/PES	2011	Incumbent
Andreas Gross	SP/PS	2011	2015
Thomas Hardegger	SP/PS	2011	2023
Alfred Heer	SVP/UDC	2011	2015
Thomas Maier	GLP/PVL	2011	2015
Martin Naef	SP/PS	2011	2023
Rosmarie Quadranti	BDP/PBD	2011	2023
Thomas Weibel	GLP/PVL	2011	Incumbent
Lothar Ziörjen	BDP/PBD	2011	2015
Gregor A. Rutz	SVP/UDC	2012	Incumbent
Thomas Matter	SVP/UDC	2014	Incumbent
Hans-Peter Portmann	FDP/PLR	2014	2015
Beat Walti	FDP/PLR	2014	Incumbent
Angelo Barrile	SP/PS	2015	Incumbent
Hans-Ulrich Bigler	FDP/PLR	2015	Incumbent
Tim Guldimann	SP/PS	2015	2018
Alfred Heer	SVP/UDC	2015	Incumbent
Roger Köppel	SVP/UDC	2015	2023
Min Li Marti	SP/PS	2015	Incumbent
Mattea Meyer	SP/PS	2015	Incumbent
Hans-Peter Portmann	FDP/PLR	2015	Incumbent
Regine Sauter	FDP/PLR	2015	Incumbent
Priska Seiler Graf	SP/PS	2015	Incumbent
Jürg Stahl	SVP/UDC	2015	2023
Barbara Steinemann	SVP/UDC	2015	Incumbent
Mauro Tuena	SVP/UDC	2015	Incumbent
Hans-Ueli Vogt	SVP/UDC	2015	2023
Bruno Walliser	SVP/UDC	2015	Incumbent
Rudolf Winkler	BDP/PBD	2015	2015
Claudio Zanetti	SVP/UDC	2015	Incumbent
Nik Gugger	EVP/PEV	2017	2023
Philipp Kutter	CVP/PDC	2018	Incumbent
Fabian Molina	SP/PS	2018	Incumbent
Martin Haab	SVP/UDC	2019	Incumbent
Benjamin Fischer	SVP/UDC	2019	Incumbent
Corina Gredig	GLP/PVL	2019	Incumbent
Barbara Schaffner	GLP/PVL	2019	Incumbent
Nik Gugger	EVP/PEV	2019	Incumbent
Katharina Prelicz-Huber	GPS/PES	2019	Incumbent
Marionna Schlatter	GPS/PES	2019	Incumbent
Andri Silberschmidt	FDP/PLR	2019	Incumbent
Céline Widmer	SP/PS	2019	Incumbent
Erich Vontobel	EDU	2023	Incumbent
Nina Fehr Düsel	SVP/UDC	2023	Incumbent
Martin Hübscher	SVP/UDC	2023	Incumbent
Islam Alijaj	SP/PS	2023	Incumbent
Anna Rosenwasser	SP/PS	2023	Incumbent
Nicole Barandun	FDP/PLR	2023	Incumbent
Yvonne Bürgin	The Centre	2023	Incumbent
