= Roger Köppel =

Swiss politician, journalist, entrepreneur and publicist (born 1965)

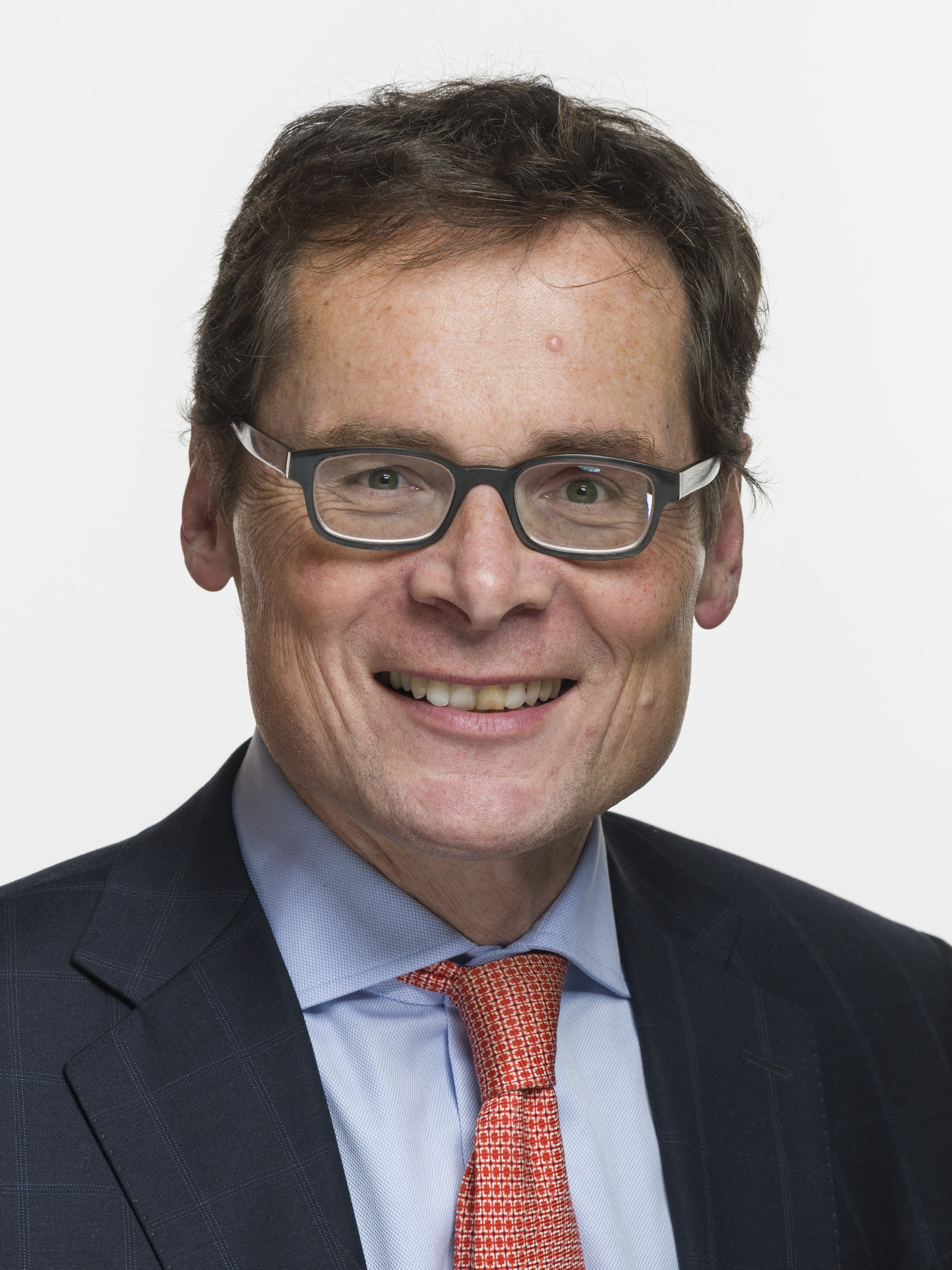
- Official portrait, 2019

Member of the National Council (Switzerland)
- Incumbent
- Assumed office 30 November 2015
- Constituency: Canton of Zürich

Personal details
- Born: Roger Jürg Köppel; 21 March 1965 (age 61) Zürich, Switzerland
- Party: Swiss People's Party
- Spouse: Biech Tien Ton
- Children: 4
- Education: Kantonsschule Zürcher Unterland
- Alma mater: University of Zürich (Licentiate)
- Website: Official website (in German)

Roger Jürg Köppel (born 21 March 1965) is a Swiss journalist, entrepreneur, publicist and politician who served as a member of the National Council for the Swiss People's Party from 2015 to 2023. He is the editor-in-chief and publisher of Die Weltwoche, a Swiss weekly magazine. He previously worked as editor-in-chief for Die Welt from 2004 to 2006.

== Early life and education ==
Köppel was born 21 March 1965 in Zürich, Switzerland to Robert Köppel, a general contractor, and Margrit Köppel (née Zumkehr), a secretary. His parents were Protestant and Catholic and died during his teens. He had one older half-brother with whom he stayed after 1971.

In 1983, he graduated from Kantonsschule Zürcher Unterland. He then studied in the University of Zurich's Department of Political Philosophy and Economic History. He completed his Licentiate in 1995. His thesis on Carl Schmitt, Autorität und Mythos: Carl Schmitt und die Wiederverzauberung staatlicher Gewalt (1916–1938) ("Authority and Myth: Carl Schmitt and the Re-enchantment of State Power") was written in collaboration with the Swiss philosopher Georg Köhler.

== Politics ==
In various public statements Köppel supported President Trump, FIFA officials Sepp Blatter and Gianni Infantino.

== Personal life ==
Köppel is married to Bich-Tien Köppel (née Ton), who was born in Switzerland to Vietnamese refugees. They have four children.
