= Paul Hensel (trade unionist) =

German trade unionist (1874–1949)

Paul Hensel (1874 – 1949) was a German trade unionist.

Hensel worked as a butcher, and joined the a local union. In 1900, this became part of the new Central Union of Butchers and Hensel was elected as the union's president. Under his leadership, the union grew steadily, from 2,000 members in 1902, to 16,643 in 1927. In 1913, it launched the International Federation of Meat Workers, with Hensel serving as its general secretary.

The International Federation merged into the new International Union of Food and Drink Workers' Associations in 1920, and in 1927, the Central Union of Butchers similarly merged into the Union of Food and Drink Workers. Hensel became a member of the new union's board, and secretary of its meat workers' section.

Trade union offices
Preceded by New position	President of the Central Union of Butchers; 1901–1927	Succeeded by Union merged
Preceded by New position	General Secretary of the International Federation of Meat Workers; 1913–1920	Succeeded by Federation merged
