= Hans Nätscher =

German trade unionist

5th President of the International Union of Food, Agricultural, Hotel, Restaurant, Catering, Tobacco and Allied Workers' Associations (IUF)
- In office 1958–1964
- Preceded by: Marius Madsen
- Succeeded by: John Swift

3rd President of the Food, Beverages and Catering Union (NGG)
- In office 1951–1962

Personal details
- Born: 13 November 1896
- Died: 28 February 1980 (aged 83)
- Occupation: Butcher; trade unionist

Hans Nätscher (13 November 1896 – 28 February 1980) was a German trade unionist.

Born in Lohr am Main, Nätscher completed an apprenticeship as a butcher in Würzburg, which was interrupted by serving in the military from 1915 to 1918. He joined the Social Democratic Party of Germany (SPD) and the Central Union of Butchers in 1914, and in 1920 was elected as chair of the union branch. He rose quickly in the union, becoming the secretary for its Northern Bavaria region, then moved to Nuremberg to work full-time for the union at its headquarters. When the union merged into the Union of Food and Drink Workers, he retained his position.

The Nazi government banned trade unions in May 1933, and Nätscher was arrested, and was in custody for most of the next three years. In 1939, he was drafted into the Wehrmacht, but managed to get himself released the following year, and found work as a gravedigger.

After World War II, Nätscher was involved in reconstructing the unions. In 1946, he became chair of a consumer co-operative in Nuremberg-Fürth, then in 1947 he became the first chair of the executive of the Bavarian Food, Beverages and Catering Union. In 1949, this merged with other regional unions to become the national Food, Beverages and Catering Union (NGG), and Nätscher served as the chair of its executive. In this post, he was highly critical of president Ferdinand Warnecke, who wished to centralise the union.

In 1951, Nätscher was elected as president of the NGG, in which role he campaigned for the union to be politically active, and in particular to oppose right-wing extremism. In 1958, he was also elected as president of the International Union of Food, Drinks and Tobacco Workers' Associations (IUF), the first German to hold the post. He retired from the NGG in 1962, and the IUF in 1964, although he was then made honorary president of the IUF, and continued voluntary work for the NGG.

Trade union offices
Preceded by Ferdinand Warnecke	President of the Food, Beverages and Catering Union; 1951–1962	Succeeded by Alfred Schattanik
Preceded by Marius Madsen	President of the International Union of Food, Drinks and Tobacco Workers' Associations; 1958–1964	Succeeded by John Swift
