= Max Wilhelm =

German trade union leader

1st President of the International Union of Food, Agricultural, Hotel, Restaurant, Catering, Tobacco and Allied Workers' Associations (IUF)
- In office 1920–1934
- Succeeded by: Robert Fischer

Secretary of the Union of Commerce, Transport and Food (VHTL)
- In office 1915–1944

Personal details
- Born: 26 November 1884
- Died: 27 November 1954 (aged 70)
- Occupation: Baker, trade unionist

Max Wilhelm (26 November 1884 – 27 November 1954) was a German trade union leader, active in Switzerland.

Born in Dachau, Wilhelm completed an apprenticeship as a baker and then became a journeyman. In 1907, he ended up in Geneva, where he resolved to improve the precarious working conditions for bakers. He joined the Union of Food and Beverage Workers, and in 1912 moved to Zürich to become its secretary. In 1915, he supported its merger into the Union of Commerce, Transport and Food (VHTL), and was appointed as central secretary of the new union.

As one of the leading figures in the union, Wilhelm focused his time on campaigning against night work and the truck system, and for bakers and confectioners to obtain a national agreement on pay and conditions. In 1920, the International Union of Food and Drink Workers was founded, and Wilhelm was elected to its executive, soon becoming its president, and serving until 1932. He retired in 1944.

Trade union offices
Preceded by New position	Central Secretary of the Union of Commerce, Transport and Food; 1915–1944	Succeeded by ?
Preceded by New position	President of the International Union of Food and Drink Workers; 1920–1932	Succeeded by Robert Fischer
