= Bakery, Confectionery, Tobacco Workers and Grain Millers International Union =

North American trade union

- Abbreviation: BCTGM
- Formation: 1886
- Type: Trade union
- Headquarters: Kensington, Maryland, US
- Locations: Canada; United States
- Members: 73,694
- President: Anthony Shelton
- Secretary-treasurer: David Woods
- Affiliations: AFL-CIO; Canadian Labour Congress; IUF
- Website: bctgm.org

The Bakery, Confectionery, Tobacco Workers and Grain Millers International Union (BCTGM) is a labor union in the United States and Canada primarily representing workers in the food processing industry. The union was established in 1886 as the Journeyman Bakers Union. The contemporary BCTGM was formed in January 1999 as a merger of the Bakery, Confectionery and Tobacco Workers' International Union and the American Federation of Grain Millers.

The BCTGM is affiliated with the AFL–CIO, the Canadian Labour Congress and the International Union of Foodworkers (IUF).

== History ==
The predecessors of today's BCTGM include the Bakery and Confectionery Workers International Union of America. The B&C began as the Journeymen's Bakers Union, organized in 1886 in Pittsburgh, Pennsylvania. Many of its original members were of German origin, and were inspired to form the union by the Deutsch-Amerikanische Blicker-Zeitung. It was chartered by the American Federation of Labor in 1887, and soon extended its jurisdiction to cover the candy and ice cream industries, leading it to change its name. In 1936, it was joined by the Amalgamated Food Workers of America.

In the late 1950s, the B&C, as it was called, was riven by accusations of corruption against its president, James G. Cross. In response, at the end of 1957, many local unions voted to disaffiliate and form a new American Bakery and Confectionery Workers' International Union. B&C was thrown out of the AFL–CIO and the ABC was admitted in its place. After 11 years of feuding, in 1969, the two organizations reunited under the B&C name.

The Tobacco Workers International Union was founded in 1895. As it and the Bakery and Confectionery Workers International Union of America shared many common goals, both organizations merged in 1978, creating the Bakery, Confectionery and Tobacco Workers (BCT).

The American Federation of Grain Millers (AFGM) also has roots stemming back to the 1800s. In 1936, the National Council of Grain Processors was formed when a number of smaller grain milling unions agreed to unite as a national union under the banner of the American Federation of Labor, one of the early umbrella organizations for labor unions. In 1941, the council was renamed the American Federation of Grain Processors and in 1948 was reorganized as the AFGM. Shared goals and shared industries led to the January 1, 1999, merger between the BCT and AFGM, creating the modern BCTGM.

Because the predecessors of BCTGM organized workers in the U.S. and Canada, they included the word "International" in their name.

== Strikes ==
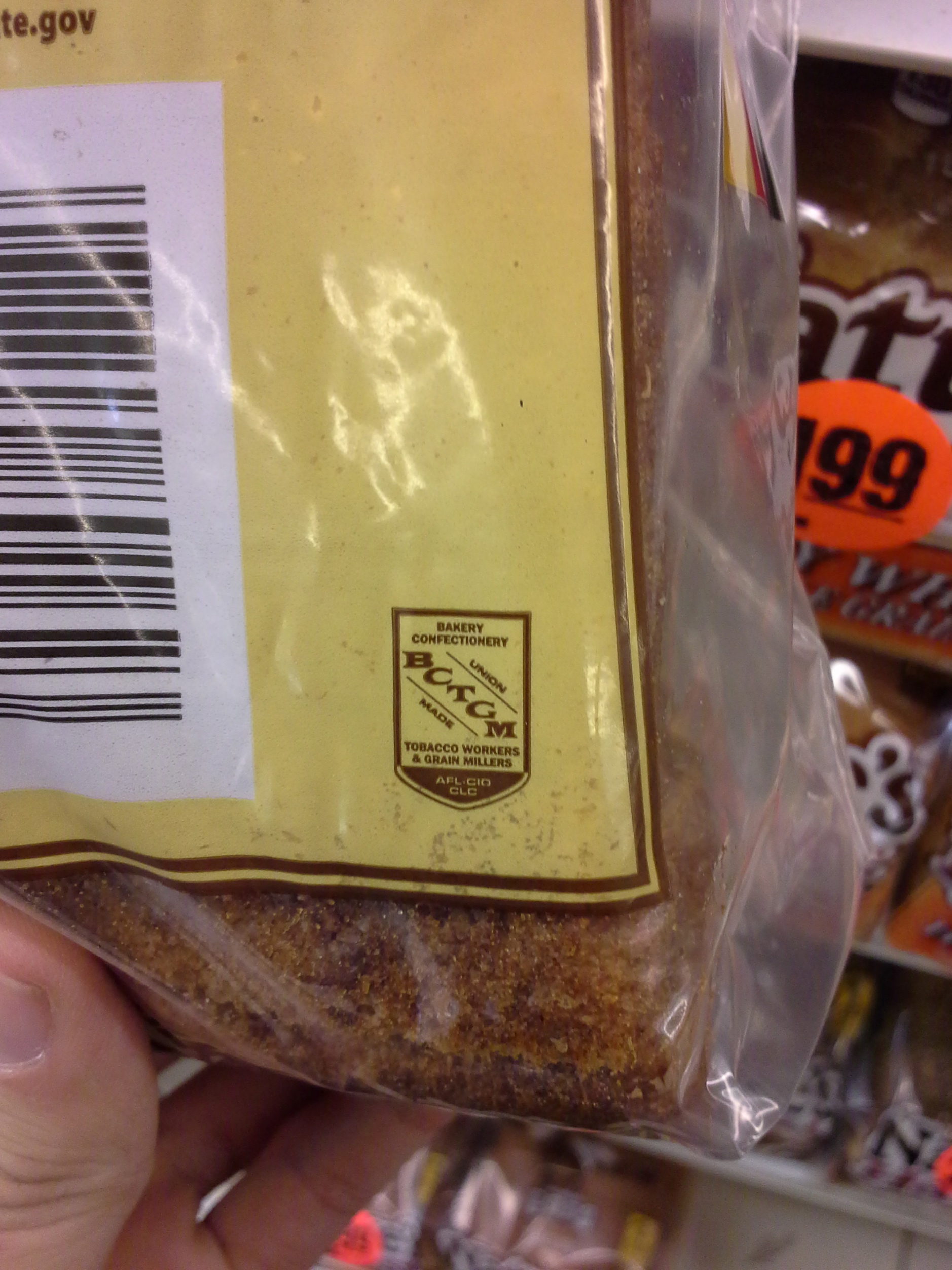
A loaf of bread bearing the BCTGM's union label

On August 26, 2000, approximately 680 BCTGM workers began a strike against The Earthgrains Company (now a subsidiary of Bimbo Bakeries USA) at a plant in Fort Payne, Alabama. The strike was brought in part to protest mandatory overtime and few days off. By August 31, 2000, the strike had spread to five other bakeries in Memphis and Chattanooga, Tennessee; Atlanta and Forest Park, Georgia; and Mobile, Alabama, where worker contracts had expired. At this time, around 1,565 workers were involved. By September 6, the strike had expanded to eight more plants. Around 2,700 workers were involved, a total of 12% of Earthgrains' workforce. The strike eventually grew to a maximum of 27 bakeries before it was ended with the ratification of a new contract at Fort Payne on September 22.

On November 9, 2012, the BCTGM went on strike at bakeries operated by Hostess Brands, to protest contract changes forced upon its members by a bankruptcy court. On November 16, 2012, after warning the union that it would be unable to continue operations unless employees returned to work, Hostess Brands, Inc., filed a motion to change its bankruptcy filing from one of reorganization to one of liquidation, shutting down the company. The liquidation resulted in the loss of 18,500 jobs, including approximately 6,500 BCTGM members. After announcing the company's liquidation, Hostess Brands published a notice announcing that the business is unprofitable under its current cost structure, much of which is determined by union wages and pension costs, describing their offer to the BCTGM as having included wage, benefit and work rule concessions and giving Hostess Brands' 12 unions a 25 percent ownership stake in the company, representation on its board of directors and $100 million in reorganized Hostess Brands' debt. The Teamsters Union had reached a deal with the Hostess, but BCTGM, representing bakery workers, refused to agree to concessions. Teamster officials were quoted as saying that the BCTGM had chosen "to not substantively look for a solution or engage in the process". BCTGM President Frank Hurt issued a statement claiming that Hostess failed because its six management teams over the last eight years were unable to make it a profitable, successful business enterprise, and that despite a commitment from the company after an earlier bankruptcy that the resources derived from the workers' concessions would be plowed back into the company, this never materialized. BCTGM President Hurt resigned from his position 6 weeks later effective January 1, 2013.

=== 2021 strike actions ===
On July 5, 2021, BCTGM members of Baker Workers Local 218 at the Frito-Lay factory in Topeka, Kansas, voted to strike. As of July 23, 2021, the strike had continued for more than two weeks. Workers spoke out about 12-hour, 7-day work weeks, stagnant wages, and inhumane conditions in the plant such as a lack of air conditioning. Speaking to Vice's Motherland, 37-year employee and union steward Mark McCarter urged consumers to boycott Frito-Lay and Pepsi products for the duration of the strike.

Starting on August 10, 2021, Nabisco employees from several bakeries and distribution centers across the United States went on strike over disagreements regarding new labor contracts with the company. By August 20, the strike involved over 1,000 workers.

On October 5, 2021, workers at all of Kellogg's cereal-producing plants in the United States went on strike over disagreements during contract negotiations.

== Leadership ==
=== Presidents ===
1941: Andrew Myrup
1943: Herman Winter
1950: William F. Schnitzler
1952: James G. Cross
1961: James Landriscina
1962: Max Kralstein
1969: Daniel E. Conway
1978: John DeConcini
1992: Frank Hurt
2013: David B. Durkee
2020: Anthony Shelton

=== Secretary-Treasurers ===
1886: George Block
1888: August Delebar
1892: George Horn
1895: Henry Weismann
1897: John Schudel
1899: Frank Harzbecker
1908: Otto Fischer
1912: Andrew Myrup
1936: Herman Winter
1943: William F. Schnitzler
1950: James G. Cross
1952: Curtis Sims
1957: Peter H. Olson
1961: Henry Bartosh
1970: Gregory Oskoian
1978: Rene Rondou
1990: Graydon E. Tetrick
1991: Frank Hurt
1992: Gene McDonald
1998: David B. Durkee
2013: Steve Bertelli
2019: Anthony Shelton
2020: David Woods

== See also ==
- Tobacco Workers International Union
