= Eduard Backert =

German trade unionist

- Born: 20 April 1874; Rottmar, Saxe-Meiningen, German Empire
- Died: 3 February 1960

Eduard Backert (20 April 1874 – 3 February 1960) was a German trade unionist.

Born in Rottmar (now part of Föritztal) in the Duchy of Saxe-Meiningen, Backert trained as a brewery worker, settling in Weida in 1892, where he joined the Central Union of Brewers. He completed military service from 1894 to 1896, then returned to brewing. From 1900, he was an unpaid local union convener, and then in 1904, he was appointed as the full-time union secretary for East Prussia.

In 1907, Backert was elected as vice president of the union, and when in 1910 it merged into the Union of Brewery and Mill Workers, he retained the position. In 1914, he succeeded as the union's president, also becoming general secretary of the International Secretariat of Brewery Workers. After World War I, he was elected to the provisional Reich Economic Council.

In 1927, Backert took his union into a merger which formed the Union of Food and Drink Workers, becoming president of the new union. The union was banned by the Nazi government in 1933, and Backert was briefly imprisoned, but he was then permitted to live quietly in Zepernick, where he preserved the union archives throughout World War II. After the war, he became an arbitrator and advised on the formation of the Food, Beverages and Catering Union.

Trade union offices
Preceded by Martin Etzel	President of the Union of Brewery and Mill Workers; 1914–1927	Succeeded by Union merged
Preceded by Martin Etzel	General Secretary of the International Secretariat of Brewery Workers; 1914–1920	Succeeded by Union merged
Preceded by New position	President of the Union of Food and Drink Workers; 1927–1933	Succeeded by Union banned
