= Swedish Hotel and Restaurant Workers' Union =

Trade union in Sweden

HRF
- Swedish Hotel and Restaurant Workers' Union
- Hotell och Restaurang Facket
- Founded: 31 March 1918
- Headquarters: Stockholm, Sweden
- Location: Sweden
- Members: 26,562
- Key people: Ella Niia, president
- Affiliations: LO, IUF
- Website: www.hrf.net

The Swedish Hotel and Restaurant Workers' Union (HRF) is a trade union in Sweden.

== History ==
The union was founded on 31 March 1918 in Gothenburg as the Swedish Hotel and Restaurant Personnel Union, bringing together local unions from Gothenburg, Helsingborg and Stockholm. It originally had 2,498, a total which fluctuated over the next 15 years. In 1932, it affiliated to the Swedish Trade Union Confederation, and membership grew steadily, reaching a peak of 59,681 in 1999. Since then, it fell rapidly, and in 2019 membership stood at 26,562.

== Presidents ==
1950: Arne Axelsson
1968: Sigvard Nyström
1978: Hans Billström
1988: Seine Svensk
1990s: Birgitta Kihlberg
2005: Ella Niia
2014: Therese Guovelin
2016: Malin Ackholt
