= Union of Brewery and Mill Workers =

The Union of Brewery and Mill Workers and Kindred Trades (German: Verbandes der Brauerei- und Mühlenarbeiter und verwandter Berufe) was a trade union representing workers in the food and drink processing industry in Germany.

The union was founded on 1 October 1910, when the Central Union of Brewery Workers merged with the German Mill Workers' Union. The brewers dominated the new union, which adopted its constitution and structure. Like its predecessors, the union affiliated to the General Commission of German Trade Unions, and it was also a leading member of the International Secretariat of Brewery Workers. In 1919, the union was a founding affiliate of the General German Trade Union Confederation.

In 1922, the union renamed itself as the Union of Food and Beverage Workers. By 1927, the union had 74,443 members. On 24 September, it merged with the Central Union of Bakers and Confectioners, the Central Union of Butchers, and the Union of Coopers, Cellar Managers, and Helpers in Germany, to form the Union of Food and Drink Workers.

== Presidents ==
1910: Martin Etzel
1914: Eduard Backert
