= Frank Hurt =

American labor union leader

13th President of the International Union of Food, Agricultural, Hotel, Restaurant, Catering, Tobacco and Allied Workers' Associations (IUF)
- In office 1997–2002
- Preceded by: Willy Vijverman
- Succeeded by: Paul Andela

9th President of the Bakery and Confectionery Workers International Union of America (BCTGM)
- In office 1992–2013

Personal details
- Born: January 2, 1939 (age 87)
- Occupation: Trade unionist

Frank Hurt (born January 2, 1939) is an American former labor union leader.

Born in Marfrance, West Virginia, Hurt joined the United Auto Workers in 1956, soon becoming a shop steward. In 1972, he began working for the Kroger Bakery in Columbus, Ohio, where he joined the Bakery and Confectionery Workers International Union of America. He became the union's business agent in 1975, and in 1979 began working full-time for the union.

In 1982, Hurt was appointed as the union's director of organizing, then in 1990, he became its executive vice president. The following year, he was elected as secretary-treasurer, then in 1992, he took the top office, of the president. In 1993, he joined the executive council of the AFL-CIO. From 1997 to 2002, he additionally served as president of the International Union of Food, Agricultural, Hotel, Restaurant, Catering, Tobacco and Allied Workers' Associations. He retired from his union posts in 2013.

Trade union offices
Preceded by Graydon E. Tetrick	Secretary-Treasurer of the Bakery, Confectionery, Tobacco Workers and Grain Millers International Union; 1991–1992	Succeeded by Gene McDonald
Preceded by John DeConcini	President of the Bakery, Confectionery, Tobacco Workers and Grain Millers International Union; 1992–2013	Succeeded by David B. Durkee
Preceded by Willy Vijverman	President of the International Union of Food, Agricultural, Hotel, Restaurant, Catering, Tobacco and Allied Workers' Associations; 1997–2002	Succeeded by Paul Andela
