= GLI =

GLI may refer to:

- Gaming Laboratories International
- Getty Leadership Institute at Claremont Graduate University
- Glen Innes Airport, in New South Wales, Australia
- Global Labour Institute, a British workers rights organization
- Great Lakes Initiative, a fictional superhero team
- Great Lakes Invitational, a college ice hockey tournament
- Greater Louisville Inc., an American business development organization
- Greyhound Lines, a North-American bus carrier
- Volkswagen GLI, an automobile
- GLI1, GLI2, GLI3, glioma-associated family of transcription factors
