= John DeConcini =

John DeConcini (September 14, 1918 – October 13, 1998) was an American labor union leader.

Born in Philadelphia, DeConcini grew up in Kulpmont, Pennsylvania. He began working at the Bond Bread Company before World War II, where he organized a local of the Bakery and Confectionery Workers International Union of America. He became a full-time organizer for the union in 1941, but left the role to serve in the US Army as a paratrooper during World War II. After the war, he returned to work for the union, becoming president of the Philadelphia local in 1950, and then as vice president of the international union in 1952.

DeConcini was one of four leaders who objected to corruption in the union. In 1957, they founded the rival American Bakery and Confectionery Workers' International Union. As executive vice president, DeConcini was prominent in efforts to bring the two unions back together, which occurred in 1969. He held the same role in the merged union, and then in 1978 was elected as president.

Membership of the union fell under DeConcini's leadership, but he set up its first political action committee. He served on the executive committee of the AFL-CIO, and also as a trustee of the George Meany Center for Labor Studies. He retired in 1992, and died six years later.

Trade union offices
Preceded by Daniel Conway	President of the Bakery, Confectionery, Tobacco Workers and Grain Millers International Union; 1978–1992	Succeeded by Frank Hurt
Preceded by Lane Kirkland	AFL-CIO delegate to the Trades Union Congress; 1988	Succeeded by Gerald McEntee
