= Union of Bakers and Related Workers of Germany =

The Union of Bakers and Related Workers of Germany (German: Verband der Bäcker und Berufsgenossen Deutschlands) was a trade union representing workers in the baking industry in Germany.

The union was founded on 5 June 1885, at a meeting in Hamburg. It was an early affiliate of the General Commission of German Trade Unions, and by 1904 had grown to 9,068 members. In 1907, it merged with the Central Union of Confectionery and Gingerbread, to form the Central Union of Bakers and Confectioners.

== Presidents ==
1890s: Pfeiffer
1895: Oskar Allmann
