= Arne Geijer =

Swedish trade unionist

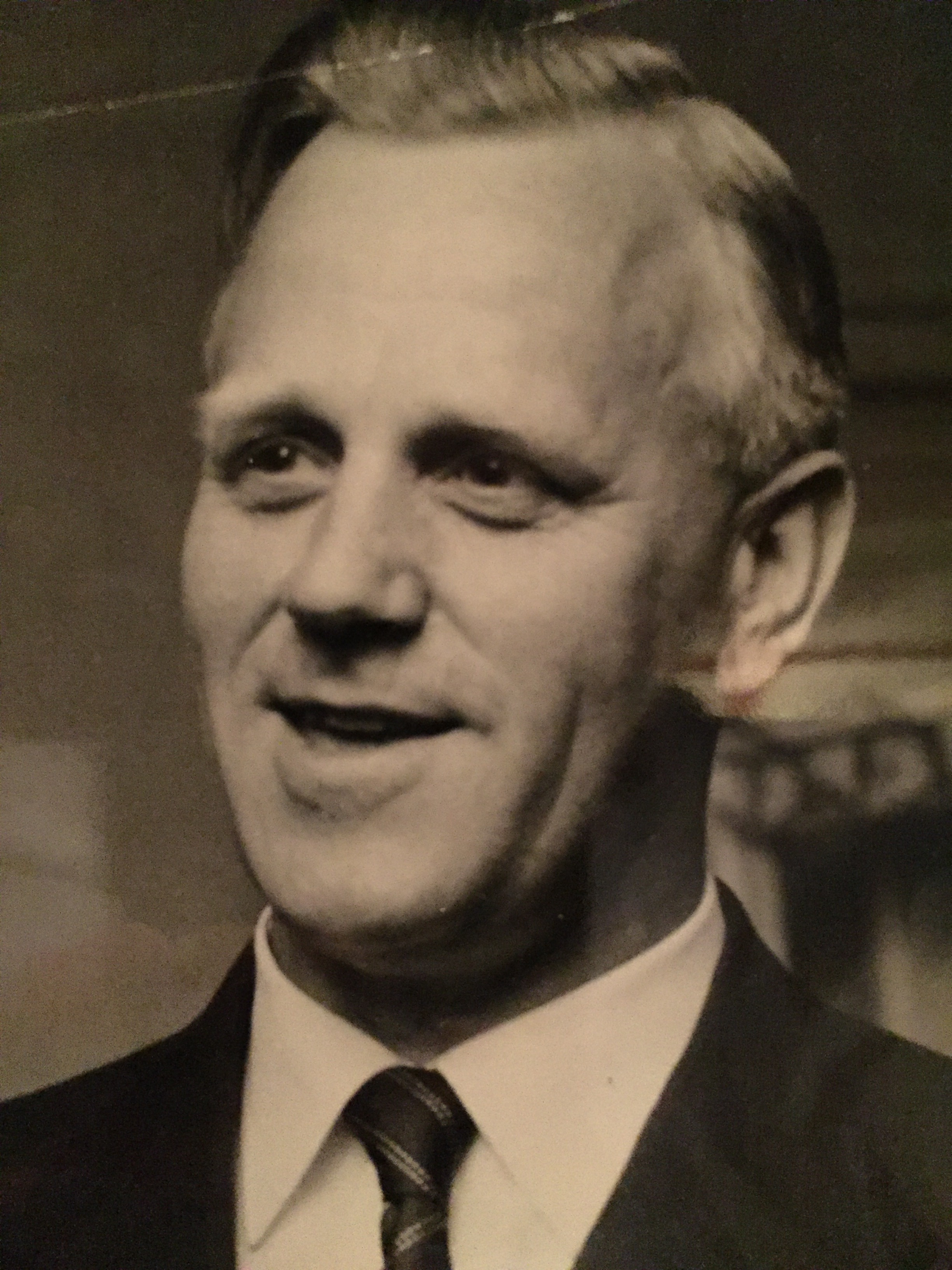

member of the Riksdag
- In office 1955–1976

General Secretary of the Swedish Metalworkers' Union
- In office 1945–1956

Chair of the Swedish Trade Union Confederation
- In office 1956–1973

President of the International Confederation of Free Trade Unions
- In office 1957–1965

Personal details
- Born: 7 May 1910 Söderala, Söderhamn Municipality, Hälsingland
- Died: 27 January 1979 (aged 68) Bromma, Stockholm
- Party: Swedish Social Democratic Party
- Occupation: trade union organizer

Arne Geijer (born 7 May 1910, in Söderala, Söderhamn Municipality, Hälsingland, died 27 January 1979 in Bromma, Stockholm) was a Swedish trade union organizer.

Geijer left school when he was thirteen and began working in agriculture. He later completed an apprenticeship as a toolmaker, and joined the Swedish Metalworkers' Union. At the age of 28 he began working full-time for the union as its director of education, and in 1945 he won election as its general secretary, also taking up a position of the council of the International Metalworkers' Federation.

In 1955, Geijer was elected to the upper house of the Riksdag, representing the Swedish Social Democratic Party. The following year, he won election as chair of the Swedish Trade Union Confederation, and from 1957 he held these two posts alongside being president of the International Confederation of Free Trade Unions. In this role, he was known for his backing for the International Solidarity Fund. He was replaced as president in 1965, but remained chair of the Swedish Trade Union Confederation until 1973. In retirement, he served as chair of the Swedish National Pensioners' Organisation from 1977 until 1979.

Trade union offices
Preceded by Oscar Westerlund	General Secretary of the Swedish Metalworkers' Union; 1945–1956	Succeeded by Åke Nilsson
Preceded by Axel Strand	Chair of the Swedish Trade Union Confederation; 1956–1973	Succeeded by Gunnar Nilsson
Preceded by Omer Becu	President of the International Confederation of Free Trade Unions; 1957–1965	Succeeded by Bruno Storti
Non-profit organization positions
Preceded by Artur Kajbjer	President of the Swedish National Pensioners' Organisation; 1977–1979	Succeeded by Lars Sandberg
