= Lage Andréasson =

Swedish trade union leader (1930–2023)

Lage Roland Andréasson

11th President of the International Union of Food, Agricultural, Hotel, Restaurant, Catering, Tobacco and Allied Workers' Associations (IUF)
- In office 1989–1993
- Preceded by: Günter Döding
- Succeeded by: Willy Vijverman

President of the Swedish Food Workers' Union (Livs)

Personal details
- Born: 15 September 1930
- Died: 25 March 2023 (aged 92)
- Occupation: Trade unionist

Lage Roland Andréasson (15 September 1930 – 25 March 2023) was a Swedish trade union leader.

Andréasson served as the president of the Swedish Food Workers' Union (Livs) from 1979 until 1991, and as president of the International Union of Food, Agricultural, Hotel, Restaurant, Catering, Tobacco and Allied Workers' Associations from 1989 until 1993. After retiring, he wrote a book on the history of Livs. From 1996 until 2004, he served as president of the Swedish National Pensioners' Organisation. In 2004, he was awarded the Illis quorum medal. He died on 25 March 2023, at the age of 92.

Trade union offices
Preceded by Åke Berggren	President of the Swedish Food Workers' Union; 1979–1991	Succeeded by Kjell Varenblad
Preceded by Günter Döding	President of the International Union of Food, Agricultural, Hotel, Restaurant, Catering, Tobacco and Allied Workers' Associations; 1989–1993	Succeeded by Willy Vijverman
Non-profit organization positions
Preceded by Lars Sandberg	President of the Swedish National Pensioners' Organisation; 1996–2004	Succeeded by Lars Wettergren
