= Swedish National Pensioners' Organisation =

The Swedish National Pensioners' Organisation (Swedish: Pensionärernas riksorganisation, PRO) is an advocacy group in Sweden representing pensioners. It was founded on 1 March 1942.

== Notable presidents ==
1977: Arne Geijer
1996: Lage Andréasson
2008: Curt Persson
2022: Åsa Lindestam
