= Global Labour Institute =

British workers rights organisation

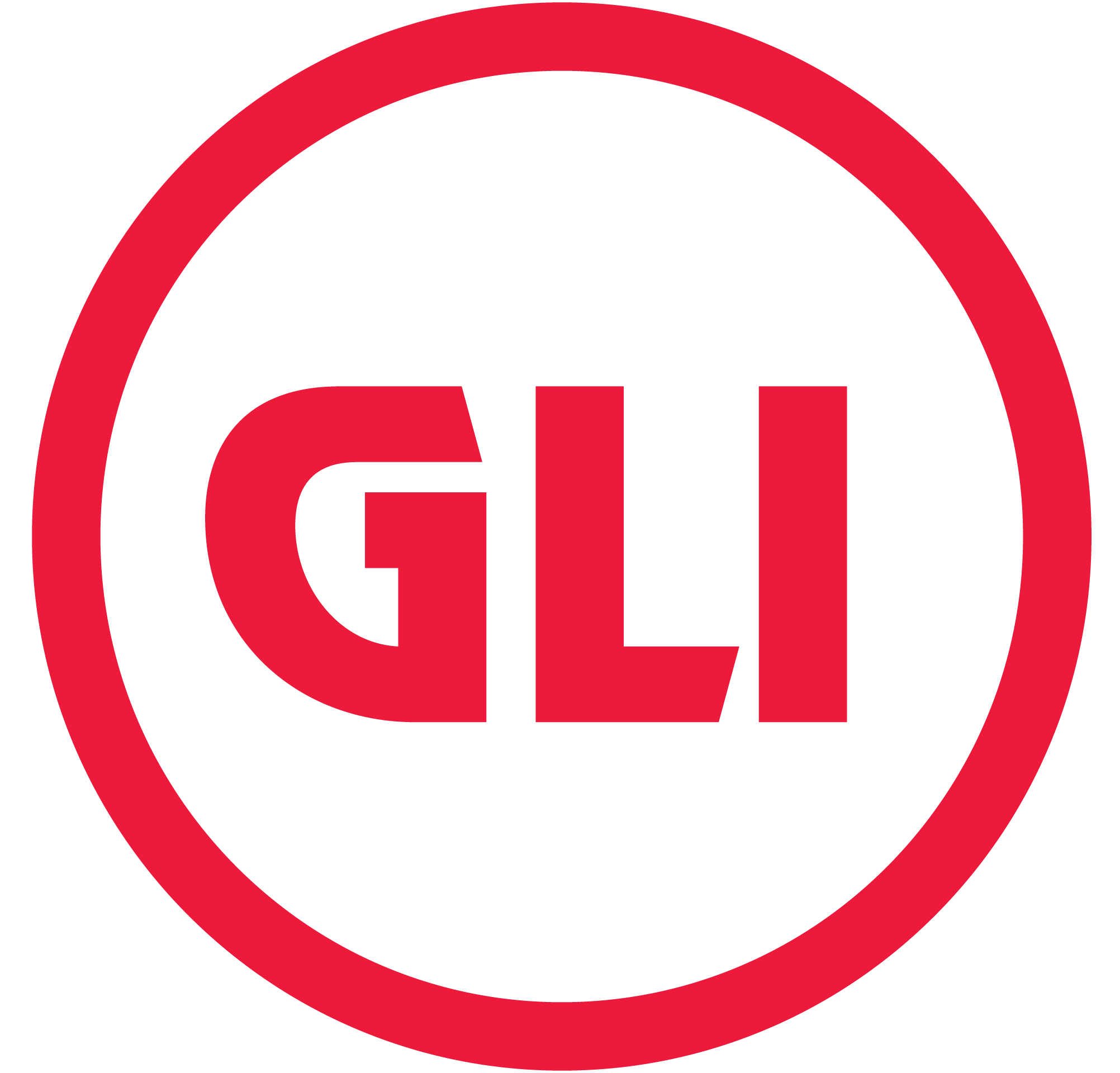
- Formation: 1997
- Founded at: Geneva
- Website: gli-manchester.net

The Global Labour Institute (GLI Network Ltd) in the UK, is part of an international network of not-for-profit organisations with the stated aim of promoting international solidarity among trade union organisations and affiliated groups in order to achieve a democratic and sustainable world society. The major activities of the GLI organisations are developing education, capacity-building and research on international labour movement development, gender policy and organising strategies. The Global Labour Institute works with global union federations, national trade unions, workers' associations, development agencies, research institutions, workers' education organisations and NGOs such as LabourStart, WIEGO and Oxfam, and it states an ideological commitment to democratic socialism.

== History ==
The first Global Labour Institute was established in Geneva in 1997 by Dan Gallin, a former General Secretary of the International Union of Food, Agricultural, Hotel, Restaurant, Catering, Tobacco and Allied Workers' Association (IUF) who has published widely on the history and future of the international trade union movement. The international GLI network is now formed of five organisations: GLI Geneva, GLI Manchester, GLI Paris, the Praxis Centre in Moscow, Russia, and the Trade Unions for Energy Democracy initiative in New York. GLI Manchester currently coordinates the GLI Network.

== Activities ==
From 2012 to 2016, the Global Labour Institute (GLI) ran an International Summer School at Northern College, Barnsley, bringing together trade unionists from across the world to discuss what are, and what should be, the politics of the international trade union movement. The schools were supported by a range of national unions in the UK and overseas and international trade union federations. The first International Summer School took place in July 2012, and included 86 participants from 26 different countries. The Global Labour Institute has run four subsequent Schools in 2013, 2014 2015, and 2016.

As well as the International Summer School, the GLI offers a wide range of courses and education programmes to the trade union movement. These include both GLI courses and bespoke education programmes commissioned from GLI by unions. Currently GLI undertakes courses as part of the national education programme for Unite the Union.

The GLI also supports the organisation, representation and livelihood of workers in the informal passenger transport economy through research and education programmes, working in partnership with the International Transport Workers Federation (ITF) and various other organisations.

The GLI also develops research and education tools to address gender inequality, ensure that the voices and concerns of women are better represented and support the development of women's programmes within the trade union.
