= International Federation of Bakers, Pastry Cooks and Allied Workers' Associations =

The International Federation of Bakers, Pastry Cooks and Allied Workers' Associations was a global union federation bringing together trade unions representing bakery workers.

== History ==
On 24 and 25 August 1907, an international congress of bakers was held in Stuttgart, and it resolved to form an international trade secretariat covering the industry. Its headquarters were located in Hamburg, and it organised a second international congress in August 1910, at which the secretariat was re-organised as the "International Federation of Bakers, Pastry Cooks and Allied Workers' Associations", and it later became known as the International Federation of Bakers and Confectioners.

The federation's leadership decided it would be more effective if it merged with other secretariats in the food industry, and so in 1919 it organised a conference in Amsterdam on the topic. The International Federation of Meat Workers and the International Federation of Brewery Workers attended, while the International Union of Hotel, Restaurant and Bar Workers and International Federation of Tobacco Workers did not. In August 1920, the bakers' international merged with the meat and brewery workers, to form the International Union of Food and Drink Workers' Associations.

== Affiliates ==
As of 1911, the federation had members in the following countries:

Union	Country	Affiliated membership
Bakers and Millers	Bosnia-Herzegovina	753
Bakers and Millers	Croatia and Slovenia	279
Bakers and Millers	Hungary	1,700
Bakers and Millers	Serbia	250
Bakers of the Seine Department	France	600
Bakers, pastry cooks, chocolate workers, confectioners	North America	105
Central Union of Bakers and Confectioners	Germany	26,000
Chocolate Workers	Hungary	105
Federation of the Catering Trades	Switzerland	556
General Dutch Union of Workers in the Baking, Chocolate and Sugar Working Industries	Netherlands	1,700

== General Secretaries ==
1907: Oskar Allmann
1918: Josef Diermeier
