= Jean Schifferstein =

Jean Schifferstein (28 June 1878 – 19 May 1941) was a Swiss and international trade union leader of German origin.

Born in Bingen am Rhein, Schifferstein completed an apprenticeship as a cooper. As a journeyman, he worked in Bern and in Rheinfelden, both in Switzerland, where he joined the Food and Drink Workers' Union. He was elected to its central committee in 1905, and became a district secretary in 1908. In 1910, he moved to Basel, to become the full-time central president of the union.

In 1915, Schifferstein led the merger of his union into the new Union of Commerce, Transport and Food (VHTL), and became its central president. In 1920, he was a leading figure in founding the International Union of Food and Allied Workers' Associations, and became its general secretary. He also served on the executive of the Swiss Trade Union Federation.

After 1933, Schifferstein devoted much time to campaigning in support of German trade unionists in exile. He left his international position in 1939, but remained leader of the VHTL until his death in 1941.

Trade union offices
Preceded by New position	Central President of the Union of Commerce, Transport and Food; 1915–1941	Succeeded by Hermann Leuenberger
Preceded by New position	General Secretary of the International Union of Food and Allied Workers' Associations; 1920–1939	Succeeded by Hermann Leuenberger
