= Hans Fehr =

Swiss politician (born 1947)

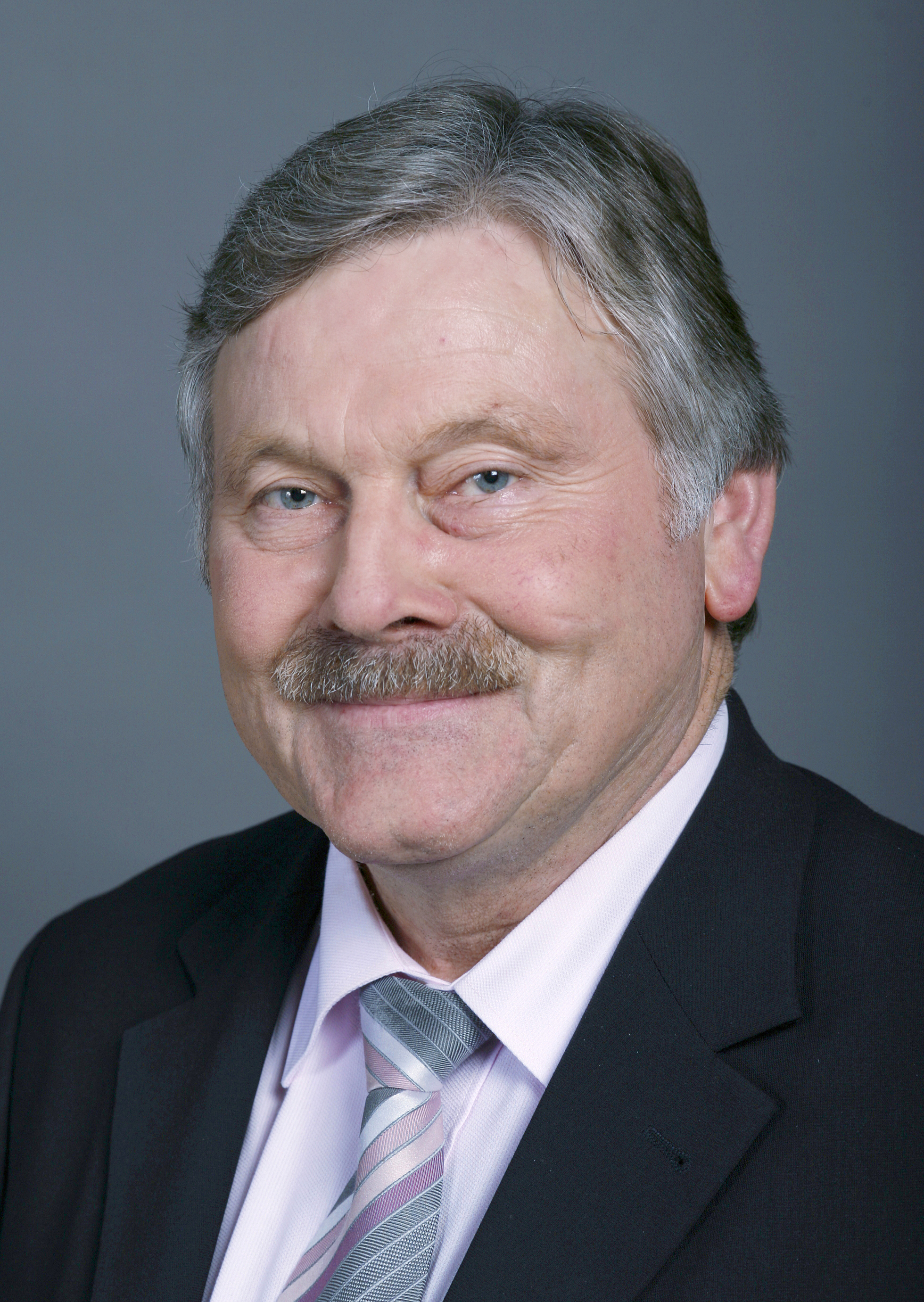
- Official portrait, 2007

Member of the National Council (Switzerland)
- In office 4 December 1995 – 29 November 2015
- Constituency: Canton of Zurich

Member of the Cantonal Council of Zurich
- In office 1991–1995

Personal details
- Born: Hans Fehr; 14 January 1947 (age 79) Berg am Irchel, Switzerland
- Spouse: Ursula Fehr
- Children: 2, including Nina
- Occupation: Educator, publicist and politician
- Website: Parliament website Official website

Military service
- Allegiance: Switzerland
- Branch/service: Swiss Armed Forces
- Rank: Lieutenant Colonel

Hans Fehr (German pronunciation: [hans feːɐ]; born 14 January 1947) is a Swiss educator, publicist and politician who served on the National Council (Switzerland) for the Swiss People's Party from 1995 to 2015. He previously served on the Cantonal Council of Zurich from 1991 to 1995 until he was elected to National Council in the 1995 Swiss federal election. In the 2023 Swiss federal election, his daughter, Nina Fehr Düsel, was elected to National Council.

== Life ==
Fehr was born 14 January 1947 in Berg am Irchel in the Zurich Highlands. He completed the Winterthur Cantonal School in 1967 and studied teaching at the Teaching Seminary of Zurich from 1967 to 1969 and from 1972 to 1974. Until 1984, Fehr was a secondary school teacher in Flaach and Eglisau.

From 1985 to 1988, he was the general secretary of the Swiss People's Party in the Canton of Zurich followed by position as general director of AUNS which he held until 2010. Ever since he has been an independent project manager for larger events.
