= Daniel E. Conway =

8th President of the International Union of Food, Agricultural, Hotel, Restaurant, Catering, Tobacco and Allied Workers' Associations (IUF)
- In office 1970–1977
- Preceded by: Henri Ceuppens
- Succeeded by: Sigvard Nyström

7th President of the Bakery, Confectionery, Tobacco Workers and Grain Millers International Union (BCTGM)
- In office 1969–1978
- Preceded by: Max Kralstein
- Succeeded by: John DeConcini

Personal details
- Born: October 18, 1911
- Died: April 13, 1987 (aged 75)
- Occupation: Baker, trade unionist

Daniel Edward Conway (October 18, 1911 – April 13, 1987) was an American labor union leader.

Born in East St Louis, Illinois, he moved to Los Angeles, where he began working as a baker. He joined the Bakery and Confectionery Workers' International Union (BCWIU), and in 1937 he became business agent of its Local 37. He steadily rose through the union, becoming vice president in 1948, director of organization in 1953, and then administrative director in 1955.

In 1957, the union was expelled from the AFL–CIO, on charges of corruption. Conway sided with the AFL–CIO, and helped form a new union, the American Bakery and Confectionery Workers' International Union, of which he became president. In 1969, the union merged into the BCWIU, and Conway became its president. The following year, he was additionally elected as president of the International Union of Food, Agricultural, Hotel, Restaurant, Tobacco and Allied Workers' Associations (IUF), serving until 1977. He retired from the BCWIU in 1978. In 1983, his wife, Kay, died, and he relocated to Carlsbad, California.

Trade union offices
Preceded by New position	President of the American Bakery and Confectionery Workers' International Union; 1957–1969	Succeeded by Union merged
Preceded by Max Kralstein	President of the Bakery and Confectionery Workers' International Union; 1969–1978	Succeeded by John DeConcini
Preceded by Henri Ceuppens	President of the International Union of Food, Agricultural, Hotel, Restaurant, Tobacco and Allied Workers' Associations; 1970–1977	Succeeded by Sigvard Nyström
