= Dan Gallin =

Polish-born trade unionist (1931–2025)

- Born: 26 April 1931; Lviv
- Died: 31 May 2025 (aged 94); Geneva
- Alma mater: University of Geneva
- Occupation: Union organizer
- Employer: International Union of Food (1968–1997)
- Spouse(s): Elizabeth Focht, Joëlle Kuntz

Dan Gallin (26 April 1931 – 31 May 2025) was a Polish-born labour activist and trade unionist. He served as Secretary General of the International Union of Food, Agricultural, Hotel, Restaurant, Catering, Tobacco and Allied Workers' Associations (IUF) from 1968 to 1997. In 1997 he founded the Global Labour Institute.

== Biography ==
Gallin was born in Lvov, Poland (now Lviv, Ukraine) on 26 April 1931, to Ana Kuharczik and Trajan Gallin, a Romanian diplomat.

His father was later posted in Germany, and sent him to Switzerland for safety in 1943. He graduated with a baccalauréat from Ecole Lemania in Lausanne in 1949. He studied at University of Kansas, and obtained a master of sociology at University of Geneva.

He joined the IUF in 1960, and became its general secretary in 1968. While at IUF, he expanded membership to organizations worldwide to prevent strikebreaking by utilizing foreign workers. Notably, he supported the Self Employed Women's Association (SEWA) in securing the 1996 Home Work Convention. He was known for his mentoring, and was elected and re-elected president of the International Federation of Workers' Education Associations (IFWEA) from 1991 to 2003. He became the first director of WIEGO’s Organization and Representation Programme in 2000.

He died on 31 May 2025, at the age of 94.
