= International Federation of Meat Workers =

Global union federation

The International Federation of Meat Workers was a global union federation bringing together unions representing butchers and abattoir workers.

The German Central Union of Butchers organised the first International Conference of Meat Workers in 1913. This agreed to form an international federation, to be based in Berlin, and led by Paul Hensel.

The International Federation of Bakers, Pastry Cooks and Allied Workers' Associations believed it would be more effective if it merged with other secretariats in the food industry, and so in 1919 it organised a conference in Amsterdam on the topic. The International Federation of Meat Workers and the International Federation of Brewery Workers attended, and in August 1920, the three organisations merged, to form the International Union of Food and Drink Workers' Associations.
