= Amalgamated Food Workers of America =

Trade union

- Predecessor: Bakery and Confectionery Workers' International Union; Hotel, Restaurant and Caterer Workers' Federation
- Merged into: Bakery and Confectionery Workers' International Union
- Formation: 1921
- Dissolved: 1935
- Type: Trade union
- Headquarters: New York City, New York, US
- Location: United States
- Members: 12,000 (1926)
- Formerly called: International Workers of the Amalgamated Food Industry

The Amalgamated Food Workers of America was a labor union representing food processing and catering workers in the United States.

The union was founded in 1921 in New York City, bringing together the Hotel, Restaurant and Caterer Workers' Federation with a dissident faction of the Bakery and Confectionery Workers' International Union (B&C). In contrast to the B&C, it adopted a class struggle perspective and operated as an industrial union, with three sections: hotel, butchery and bakery workers.

The union was originally named the International Workers of the Amalgamated Food Industry, and adopted its final name in 1923. As of 1926, it had 12,000 members. In 1935, it merged into the B&C.
