= Martin Etzel =

German trade union leader

Martin Etzel (1867 – 1914) was a German trade union leader.

Etzel was born in Rothenburg ob der Tauber, Kingdom of Bavaria. He completed an apprenticeship in brewing, and joined the Central Union of Brewery Workers in 1895. He devoted much of his time to the union, and served on its agitation committee for Northern Bavaria. In 1899, suffering with poor health, he began working in a hotel, but remained active in the brewery union, working unpaid as its leader in Northern Bavaria from 1900.

In 1904, Etzel began working full-time for the union, based in Hamburg, and in 1907, he was elected as its president. He was also a leading figure in the formation of the International Secretariat of Brewery Workers, serving as its general secretary.

In 1910, Etzel led the union into a merger which formed the Union of Brewery and Mill Workers. The new union was dominated by the brewery workers, and Etzel remained its leader. The union grew significantly, and by 1913, had 51,537 members.

Etzel died in 1914, still in office.

Trade union offices
Preceded by Georg Bauer	President of the Central Union of Brewery Workers; 1907–1910	Succeeded by Union merged
Preceded by New position	General Secretary of the International Secretariat of Brewery Workers; 1908–1914	Succeeded by Eduard Backert
Preceded by New position	President of the Union of Brewery and Mill Workers; 1910–1914	Succeeded by Eduard Backert
