= Union of Coopers, Cellar Managers, and Helpers in Germany =

The Union of Coopers, Cellar Managers, and Helpers in Germany (German: Verband der Böttcher, Weinküfer und Hilfsarbeiter Deutschlands) was a trade union representing coopers and those in related trades, in Germany.

The union was founded in 1885, as a travel support association for coopers, based in Bremen. By 1886, the organisation had 3,000 members. By 1893, the union's membership had reached 6,000, and in 1897, it was able to appoint a full-time president, Carl Winkelmann.

The union affiliated to the General Commission of German Trade Unions, and was a founding affiliate of its successor, the General German Trade Union Federation. By 1927, the union had 8,142 members. That year, it merged with the Central Union of Bakers and Confectioners, the Union of Brewery and Mill Workers, and the Central Union of Butchers, to form the Union of Food and Drink Workers.

== Presidents ==
1885: Neure
1897: Carl Winkelmann
1924:
