= Nina Fehr Düsel =

Swiss jurist and politician

Nina Fehr Düsel JD
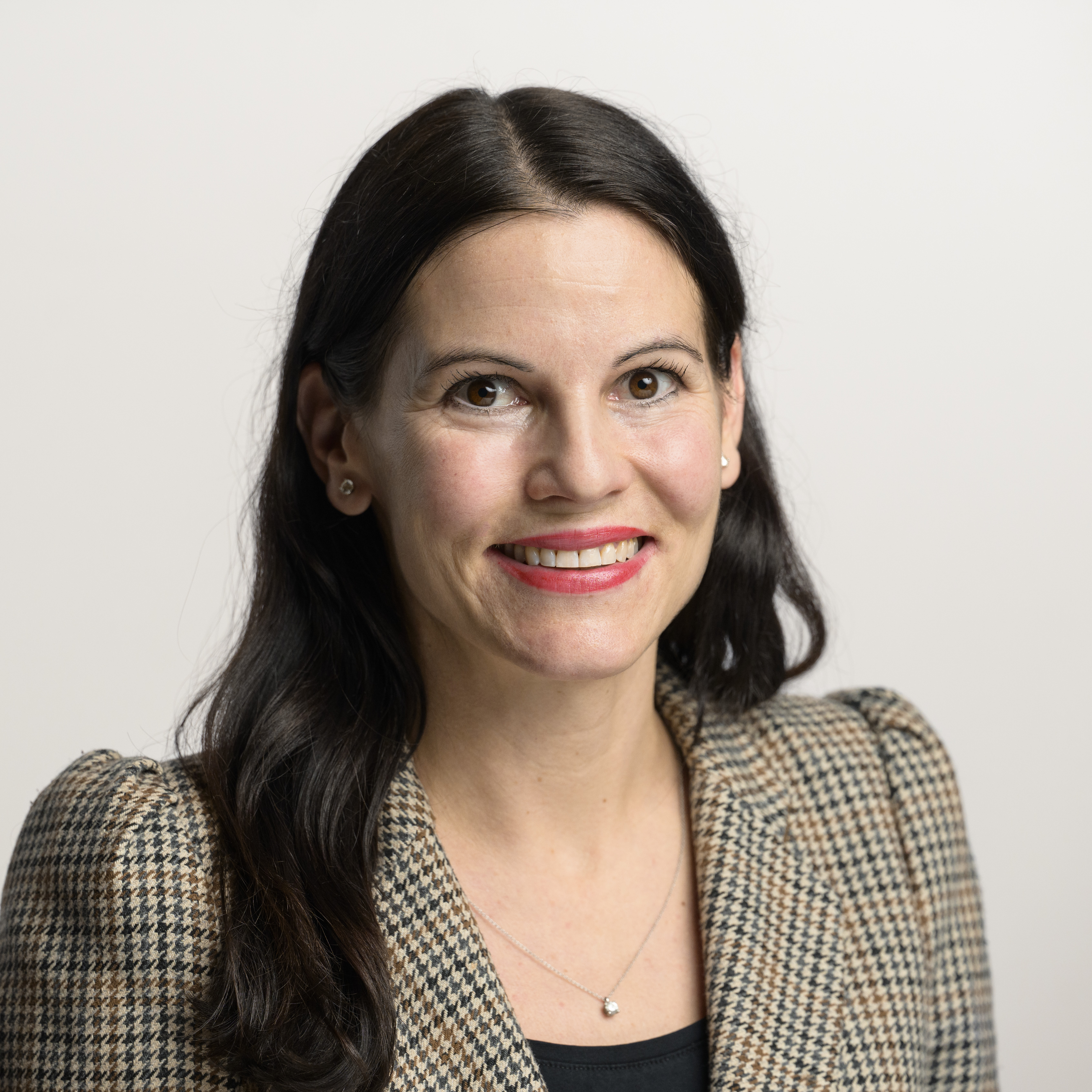
- Official portrait, 2019

Member of the National Council (Switzerland)
- Incumbent
- Assumed office 22 October 2023
- Constituency: Canton of Zurich

Member of the Cantonal Council of Zurich
- In office 30 November 2015 – 27 November 2023

Personal details
- Born: Ursina Anna Fehr; 27 November 1980 (age 45)
- Party: Swiss People's Party
- Spouse: Thomas Düsel (m. 2014)
- Parent(s): Hans Fehr; Ursula Fehr
- Education: Kantonsschule Zürcher Unterland
- Alma mater: University of Zurich (Licentiate); Université Paris X University of Lausanne (Mobility Diploma); University of Zurich (JD)
- Website: Official website Parliament website

Ursina Anna Fehr Düsel colloquially Nina Fehr Düsel (née Fehr; German pronunciation: [ˈniːna ˈfeːʁ ˈdyːzl̩] born 27 November 1980) is a Swiss jurist and politician who currently serves as member the National Council (Switzerland) for the Swiss People's Party after being elected in the 2023 Swiss federal election. She currently also serves as member of the Cantonal Council of Zurich since 2015. She is a daughter of the former National Councillor Hans Fehr (b. 1947).

== Early life and education ==
Fehr Düsel was born 27 November 1980 to Hans Fehr (b. 1947), an educator and publicist, and Ursula Fehr, a teacher and author, who served as president of the municipal council of Eglisau.

She completed her Matura Typus B at Kantonsschule Zürcher Unterland in Bülach in 2001. Between 2001 and 2007 she completed a Licentiate degree in Law at the University of Zurich. During 2002/3 she took-part in a Erasmus programme at the Université Paris X. From 2003-4 she completed a mobility diploma at the Université de Lausanne. Ultimately, she completed her Juris Doctor in Contract Law at the University of Zurich in 2017.

Düsel has been completing a variety of certifications and seminaries in project management and insurance, as part of her continuing education.

== Career ==
During her school years she was a correspondent for a local radio station and news outlet. Since March 2003, she completed training as a flight attendant, at Swissair, followed by a management role in a business association. After completing her degree she worked as an auditor for the public prosecutor's office in Winterthur. After roles as underwriter at Zurich Insurance she became legal counsel at Swiss Life.

== Personal life ==
In 2014, she married businessman and IT consultant Thomas Düsel, who is a Managing partner of accellence GmbH, a digital advisory and transformation agency. They have two children born in 2015 and 2016. Fehr Düsel resides in Küsnacht on Lake Zurich.
