= Oskar Allmann =

German trade unionist (1868–1940)

Emil Oskar Eduard Karl Allmann (27 June 1868 – 1940) was a German trade unionist.

== Biography ==
Born in Buttelstedt, Allmann worked as a baker, and joined the Union of Bakers and Related Workers of Germany. He became secretary of the union's control commission in 1889, and chairman of its Hamburg branch the following year. In 1895, he was elected as president of the union. In 1907, he took the union into a merger which formed the Central Union of Bakers and Confectioners, remaining president of the new union. That year, he also led the formation of the International Federation of Bakers, Pastry Cooks and Allied Workers' Associations, becoming its general secretary.

Allmann stood down from his trade union posts in 1918, facing opposition from within the union for having been too supportive of the conduct of World War I. He remained involved with the trade union movement until 1923, when he supported a three-shift baking system which the union opposed. In 1930, his Geschichte der deutschen Bäcker- und Konditoren-bewegung was published.

Trade union offices
Preceded by Pfeiffer	President of the Union of Bakers and Related Workers of Germany; 1895–1907	Succeeded by Union merged
Preceded by New position	President of the Central Union of Bakers and Confectioners; 1907–1918	Succeeded by Josef Diermeier
Preceded by New position	General Secretary of the International Federation of Bakers, Pastry Cooks and Allied Workers' Associations; 1907–1918	Succeeded by Josef Diermeier
