= Hermann Leuenberger =

Member of the Federal Assembly (Switzerland)
- In office 1939–1971
- Constituency: Canton of Zürich

3rd President and General Secretary (Acting) of the International Union of Food, Agricultural, Hotel, Restaurant, Catering, Tobacco and Allied Workers' Associations (IUF)
- In office 1939–1949
- Preceded by: Robert Fischer
- Succeeded by: Marius Madsen

President of the Swiss Trade Union Federation (SGB)
- In office 1958–1968

President of the Union of Commerce, Transport and Food (VHTL)
- In office 1941–1958

Personal details
- Born: 15 July 1901
- Died: 30 December 1975 (aged 74)
- Party: Social Democratic Party of Switzerland (SP/PS)
- Occupation: Politician, trade unionist

Hermann Leuenberger (15 July 1901 – 30 December 1975) was a Swiss trade union leader and politician.

Born in Basel, Leuenberger started an apprenticeship as a painter, but became active in the Social Democratic Party of Switzerland (SP) and the trade union movement. He was particularly inspired by the October Revolution, and spent time in 1920 and 1921 in the Soviet Union. He then returned to Basel, to work as a labourer, while holding membership of the Union of Commerce, Transport and Food (VHTL).

In 1924 and 1925, Leuenberger undertook labour movement training in Frankfurt am Main, then returned once more to Basel, where he worked as a chauffeur. In 1929, he began working full-time for the VHTL, as a secretary, becoming central secretary in 1933, and then central president in 1941. From 1939 until 1948, he also served as president and acting general secretary of the International Union of Food and Allied Workers' Associations.

Leuenberger also remained active in the SP, winning election as a councillor in Zurich in 1935. In 1939, he was elected to the Swiss Federal Assembly, representing the Canton of Zürich, serving until 1971. From 1954 until 1969, he was also a member of the SP's management committee. He additionally founded the Foundation for Consumer Protection, and campaigned for consumer rights and equality for women.

In 1937, Leuenberger was elected to the executive of the Swiss Trade Union Federation (SGB), becoming its vice president in 1943, and president in 1958, retiring in 1968. He argued in favour of all its affiliates merging to become a single union, but this did not find significant support.

Trade union offices
Preceded by Robert Fischer	President of the International Union of Food and Allied Workers' Associations; 1939–1948	Succeeded by Marius Madsen
Preceded by Jean Schifferstein	Acting General Secretary of the International Union of Food and Allied Workers' Associations; 1939–1948	Succeeded by Juul Poulsen
Preceded by Jean Schifferstein	Central President of the Union of Commerce, Transport and Food; 1941–1966	Succeeded by Erich Gygax
Preceded by Arthur Steiner	President of the Swiss Trade Union Federation; 1958–1968	Succeeded by Ernst Wüthrich
