= Central Union of Butchers =

Central Union of Butchers and Kindred Trades in Germany
- Zentralverband der Fleischer und Berufsgenossen Deutschlands
- Merged into: Union of Food and Drink Workers
- Founded: 1 June 1900; 125 years ago
- Dissolved: 1927; 99 years ago
- Location: Germany
- Publication: Der Fleischer
- Affiliations: ADGB, IUF

The Central Union of Butchers and Kindred Trades of Germany (German: Zentralverband der Fleischer und Berufsgenossen Deutschlands) was a trade union representing butchers and abattoir workers in Germany.

In 1898, Theodor Keslinke founded the Local Union of Butchers, in Berlin, with the aim of turning it into a national organisation. In March 1900, it launched a national journal, Der Fleischer, and then on 1 June, it established the "Central Union of Meat Workers", a national union affiliated to the General Commission of German Trade Unions. Membership grew steadily, from 2,000 in 1902, to 16,643 in 1927.

In 1913, the union held a conference which founded the International Federation of Meat Workers, and the union thereafter provided the federation's leadership. In 1919, the union was a founding affiliate of the General German Trade Union Confederation.

On 24 September 1927, the union merged with the Central Union of Bakers and Confectioners, the Union of Brewery and Mill Workers, and the Union of Coopers, Cellar Managers, and Helpers in Germany, to form the Union of Food and Drink Workers. That union was banned, along with all other German unions, by the Nazi regime on May 2, 1933, when storm troopers occupied all trade union headquarters across Germany, arresting union leaders and confiscating the unions' funds while blacklisting union officials.

== Presidents ==
1900: Paul Hensel
