= Liberales Institut =

Swiss classical liberal think tank

Logo of the Liberales Institut

The Liberales Institut (Liberal Institute, Institut Libéral, Istituto Liberale) is a Swiss classical liberal think tank, founded in Zürich in 1979 by Lili Nabholz, Thomas Wagner, Walter Blum and Ulrich Pfister. It publishes mainly in German, French and Italian, and accessorily in English.

In an analysis of its political orientation where it was profiled and compared to five other pro-free market and climate change-skeptical European institutes, researchers from the University of Colorado and three Spanish universities concluded its output revealed the lowest net amount of contesting the notion and legitimacy of there being a scientific consensus around the existence and causes of climate change. The researchers further stated that the Liberales Institut showed significant adherence to Austrian School Economics.

Liberales Institut has collaborated with universities and other think tanks in organizing conferences. One such example was the 2015 "Cash on Trial" conference jointly held with the University of Zurich. This event spawned further discussion around the idea that attempts to block the use of cash must take into consideration negative externalities of such restrictions, including the impact on 'disadvantaged' groups of society and on people in other countries".

In a March 2012 edition of the Tages-Anzeiger-Magazin an entire article was devoted to criticizing the institute's "onesided... pro-free market position" in an essay written by a former member, Swiss philosopher Georg Kohler.

== Awards ==
- 1991: Freiheitspreis from Max-Schmidheiny-Stiftung
- 2005: Templeton Freedom Award for Institute Excellence
- 2021: Netzwerkpreis der Friedrich August von Hayek Gesellschaft
