= Sigvard Nyström =

Swedish union leader

9th President of the International Union of Food, Agricultural, Hotel, Restaurant, Catering, Tobacco and Allied Workers' Associations (IUF)
- In office 1977–1981
- Preceded by: Daniel E. Conway
- Succeeded by: Günter Döding

President of the Swedish Hotel and Restaurant Workers' Union (HRF)
- In office 1969–1978
- Preceded by: Arne Axelsson
- Succeeded by: Hans Billström

Personal details
- Born: 13 August 1916
- Died: 1994 (aged 77–78)
- Occupation: Trade unionist

Sigvard Nyström (13 August 1916 – 1994) was a Swedish trade union leader and anti-fascist.

Born in Stockholm, he found work as a lift attendant in a warehouse for the SARA restaurant, where he joined the Swedish Hotel and Restaurant Workers' Union (HRF). He also became active in the Swedish Social Democratic Party.

In 1944, Nyström was seconded to work as a driver for the Swedish embassy in Berlin, chosen due to his anti-fascist views. After World War II, he worked on the country's humanitarian aid programme, only returning to Sweden in 1947. He began working full-time for the HRF, becoming its general secretary in 1950, and from 1962 to 1965 editing its journal.

Nyström was elected as president of the HRF in 1968, and also joined the executive body of the Hotel, Restaurant and Catering Workers' Trade Group of the International Union of Food, Agricultural, Hotel, Restaurant, Tobacco and Allied Workers' Associations (IUF), becoming its chair in 1971. In 1973, he was elected as joint vice-president of the IUF, and then in 1975 he became president of the IUF's European section. Finally, in 1977, he was elected as president of the IUF.

As president of the IUF, Nyström focused on expanding membership to unions in poorer countries. He retired from the HRF in 1978, and from the IUF in 1981. He then wrote a history of the IUF, which was published in 1983. He died in 1994.

Trade union offices
Preceded by Arne Axelsson	President of the Swedish Hotel and Restaurant Workers' Union; 1968–1978	Succeeded by Hans Billström
Preceded by Daniel E. Conway	President of the International Union of Food, Agricultural, Hotel, Restaurant, Tobacco and Allied Workers' Associations; 1977–1981	Succeeded by Günter Döding
