= Central Union of Bakers and Confectioners =

German trade union (1907–1927)

German Basic and Luxury Food Workers' Union
- Deutscher Nahrungs- und Genußmittelarbeiter-Verband
- Predecessor: Union of Bakers and Related Workers of Germany, Central Union of Confectionery and Gingerbread
- Merged into: Union of Food and Drink Workers
- Founded: 1 July 1907
- Dissolved: 1927
- Location: Germany
- Affiliations: ADGB, UIBC

The Central Union of Bakers and Confectioners (German: Zentralverband der Bäcker, Konditoren und Verwandter Berufsgenossen Deutschlands) was a trade union that played a significant role in representing workers in bakeries and related trades in Germany.

The union was founded in 1907, when the Union of Bakers and Related Workers of Germany merged with the Central Union of Confectionery and Gingerbread. Soon after, it organised an international conference in Stuttgart, which established the International Federation of Bakers, Pastry Cooks and Allied Workers' Associations. Nationally, the union was affiliated to the General Commission of German Trade Unions, then from 1919 to its successor, the General German Trade Union Confederation. The union published the Bäcker und Konditoren-Zeitung until 1922, when it was replaced by Einigkeit.

During World War I, the union maintained close links with members who were serving in the armed forces, for example, polling them on its policy on night baking. After World War I, the union led a prominent campaign against night work, and it also promoted agreements on tariffs. In 1918, it changed its name to the German Basic and Luxury Food Workers' Union (German: Deutscher Nahrungs- und Genußmittelarbeiter-Verband) and in Leipzig Josef Diermeir was elected.

By 1927, the union had 52,580 members. On 24 September, it merged with the Union of Brewery and Mill Workers, the Central Union of Butchers, and the Union of Coopers, Cellar Managers, and Helpers in Germany, to form the Union of Food and Drink Workers.

== Presidents ==
1907: Oskar Allmann
1918: Josef Diermeier
