= Günter Döding =

German trade union leader

10th President of the International Union of Food, Agricultural, Hotel, Restaurant, Catering, Tobacco and Allied Workers' Associations (IUF)
- In office 1981–1989
- Preceded by: Sigvard Nyström
- Succeeded by: Lage Andréasson

6th President of the Food, Beverages and Catering Union (NGG)
- In office 1978–1989
- Preceded by: Herbert Stadelmaier
- Succeeded by: Erich Herrmann

Personal details
- Born: 4 September 1930
- Died: 8 August 2005 (aged 74)
- Occupation: Cigar sorter, trade unionist

Günter Friedrich Wilhelm Döding (4 September 1930 – 8 August 2005) was a German trade union leader.

Born in Isenstedt, Döding worked as a coal miner before becoming a cigar sorter. He joined the Food, Beverages and Catering Union (NGG), and soon began working for it full-time in Wuppertal. In 1956, he joined the union's national executive as youth secretary, and was given charge of the NGG's tobacco sector.

In 1966, Döding became vice president of the NGG, then in 1978 was elected as its president. As leader of the union, he championed early retirement policies for workers, an environmental tax and new laws on working hours. His policy views attracted attention, and in 1985 he set them out fully in a book, Die neuen Aufgaben der Gewerkschaften.

Döding was elected as president of the International Union of Food, Agricultural, Hotel, Restaurant, Tobacco and Allied Workers' Associations in 1981. In 1988, he was implicated in an accounting scandal at co op AG, leading him to retire from his union positions.

Trade union offices
Preceded by Herbert Stadelmaier	President of the Food, Beverages and Catering Union; 1978–1989	Succeeded by Erich Herrmann
Preceded by Sigvard Nyström	President of the International Union of Food, Agricultural, Hotel, Restaurant, Tobacco and Allied Workers' Associations; 1981–1989	Succeeded by Lage Andréasson
