= Food, Beverages and Catering Union =

German trade union

NGG
- Food, Beverages and Catering Union
- Gewerkschaft Nahrung-Genuss-Gaststätten
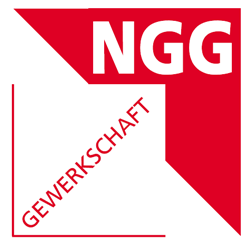
- Predecessor: Union of Food and Drink Workers
- Founded: 1949
- Headquarters: Hamburg, Germany
- Location: Germany
- Members: 205,900 (2014)
- Key people: Franz-Josef Möllenberg, president
- Affiliations: DGB
- Website: www.ngg.net

The Food, Beverages and Catering Union (German: Gewerkschaft Nahrung-Genuss-Gaststätten, NGG) is a trade union in Germany. It has a membership of 205,900 and is one of eight industrial affiliates of the German Confederation of Trade Unions.

== Membership ==
Today, NGG mainly represents employees at major companies such as McDonald's, Nestlé and Unilever in Germany.

== Presidents ==
1949: Gustav Pufal
1950: Ferdinand Warnecke
1951: Hans Nätscher
1962: Alfred Schattanik
1966: Herbert Stadelmaier
1978: Günter Döding
1989: Erich Herrmann
1990: Heinz-Günter Niebrügge
1992: Franz-Josef Möllenberg
2013: Michaela Rosenberger
2018: Guido Zeitler

== Notable members ==
- Olaf Scholz – first mayor of Hamburg
