= Nicole Barandun =

Swiss politician (born 1968)

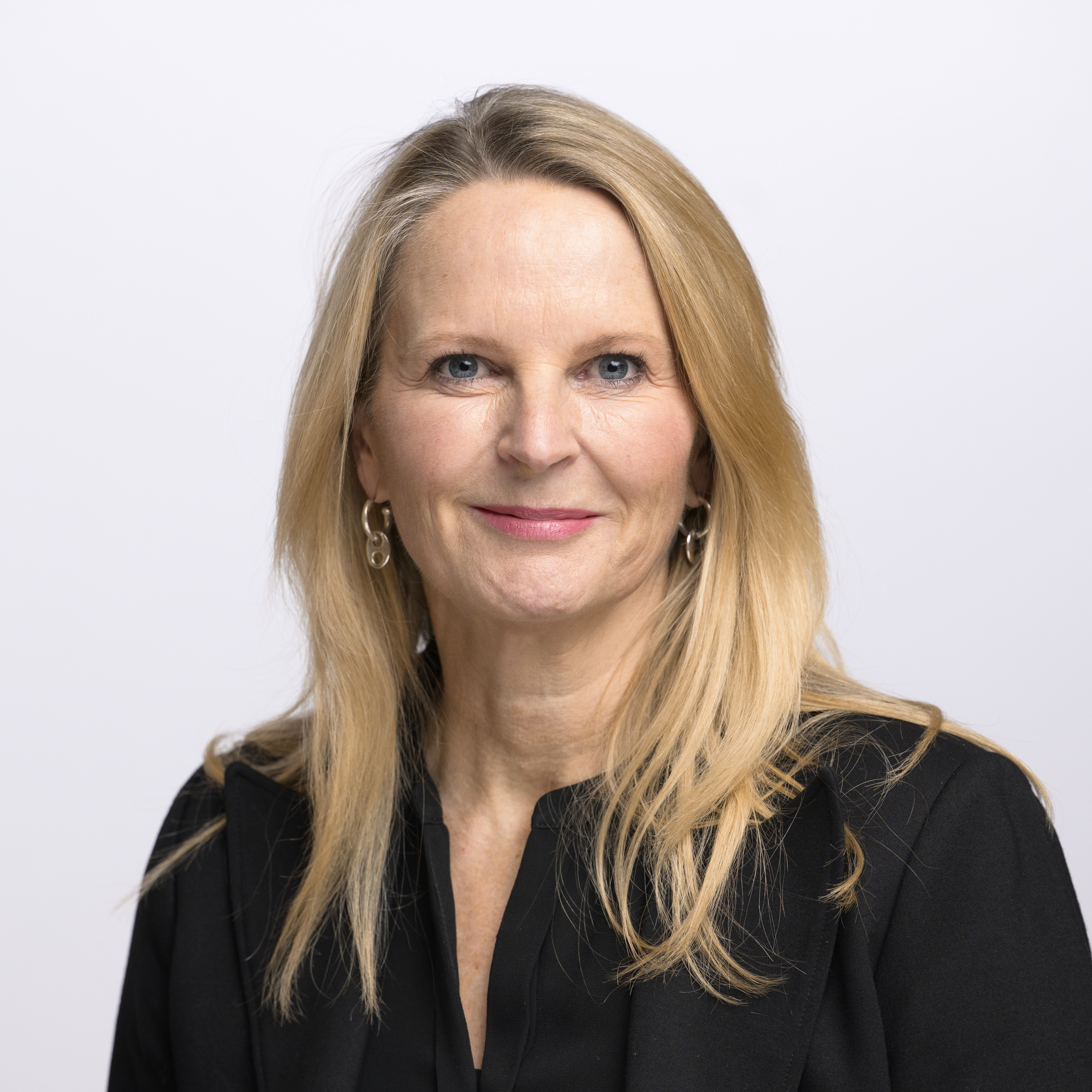
- Nicole Barandun in 2023

Member of the National Council (Switzerland)
- Incumbent
- Assumed office 4 December 2023
- Constituency: Canton of Zürich

Member of the Cantonal Council of Zürich
- In office 1 September 2008 – 8 May 2011

Personal details
- Born: Nicole Gross; 25 April 1968 (age 57) Zürich, Switzerland
- Spouse: Nicolà Barandun
- Children: 3
- Occupation: Attorney; politician
- Website: Official website

Nicole Barandun (née Gross; German pronunciation: [nɪˈkoːlə baˈrandʊn]; born 25 April 1968) is a Swiss attorney and politician who is currently a member of the National Council (Switzerland) for The Centre since 4 December 2023. She previously was co-chair of The Centre of Zürich together with Thomas Hürlimann. She also served one term on the Cantonal Council of Zürich from 2008 to 2011.

Barandun is an attorney, specializing in matrimonial law and inheritance law, at Barandun Ltd., a leading firm in tax and legal, founded by her husband Nicolà Barandun. She currently serves on the Board of directors of Bank Sparhafen Zürich as well as of a variety of other organizations.
