= Marfrance, West Virginia =

- Unincorporated community
- Location within West Virginia Location within the United States
- Coordinates: 38°03′20″N 80°41′28″W
- Country: United States
- State: West Virginia
- County: Greenbrier
- Elevation: 3,084 ft (940 m)
- Time zone: UTC-5 (Eastern (EST))
  - Summer (DST): UTC-4 (EDT)
- Area codes: 304 & 681
- GNIS feature ID: 1555046

Marfrance is an unincorporated community and a coal town in Greenbrier County, West Virginia, United States. Marfrance is located in 1 mile (1.6 km) east of Quinwood.

The community's name is an amalgamation of Margaret and Frances, which are the names of local coal mines.
