= Union of Commerce, Transport and Food =

The Union of Commerce, Transport and Food (German: Verband der Handels-, Transport- und Lebensmittelarbeiter, VHTL; French: Fédération du commerce, des transports et de l'alimentation) was a trade union representing workers in various industries, particularly food processing, retail, hospitality and goods transport.

The union was founded in 1915, when the Union of Food and Beverage Workers merged with the Union of Trade and Transport Workers. It affiliated to the Swiss Trade Union Federation, and grew from 5,452 members to 19,492 in 1920. Its membership fluctuated rapidly over the next few decades, peaking at 41,247 in 1947. It signed an increasing number of collective agreements. In 1982, it renamed itself as the Union of Sales, Trade, Transport and Food, while retaining its VHTL abbreviation.

By 1998, the union's membership was down to 19,093, with 39% working in commerce, 33% in food processing, 19% in transport, 3% in hospitality, and the remainder across several minor sectors. On 16 October 2004, it merged with the Swiss Metalworkers' and Watchmakers' Union and the Union of Construction and Industry, to form Unia.

== Presidents ==
1915: Jean Schifferstein
1941: Hermann Leuenberger
1966: Erich Gygax
1975: Peter W. Küng
1995: Rita Gassmann
1997: Beatrice Alder
1999: Martin Meyer and Claude Vaucher
