= Union of Food and Drink Workers =

German trade union

- Verband der Nahrungsmittel- und Getränkearbeiter
- Successor: Union of Trade, Food and Luxuries (E Germany), Food, Beverages and Catering Union (W Germany)
- Founded: 24 September 1927
- Dissolved: May 2, 1933
- Headquarters: Berlin
- Location: Germany
- Members: 159,636 (1927)
- Key people: Eduard Backert (President)
- Affiliations: ADGB, IUF

The Union of Food and Drink Workers (German: Verband der Nahrungsmittel- und Getränkearbeiter, VNG) was a trade union representing workers in the food and drink processing industry in Germany.

The union was founded in 1927, when the Central Union of Bakers and Confectioners merged with the Union of Brewery and Mill Workers, the Central Union of Butchers, and the Union of Coopers, Cellar Managers, and Helpers in Germany. On formation, the union had 159,636 members and, like its predecessors, it affiliated to the General German Trade Union Confederation. It was based in Berlin, and led by Eduard Backert. In 1933, it was banned by the Nazis, and after World War II, workers in the industry were represented by the Food, Beverages and Catering Union.
