= Martin Hübscher =

Swiss farmer and politician (born 1969)

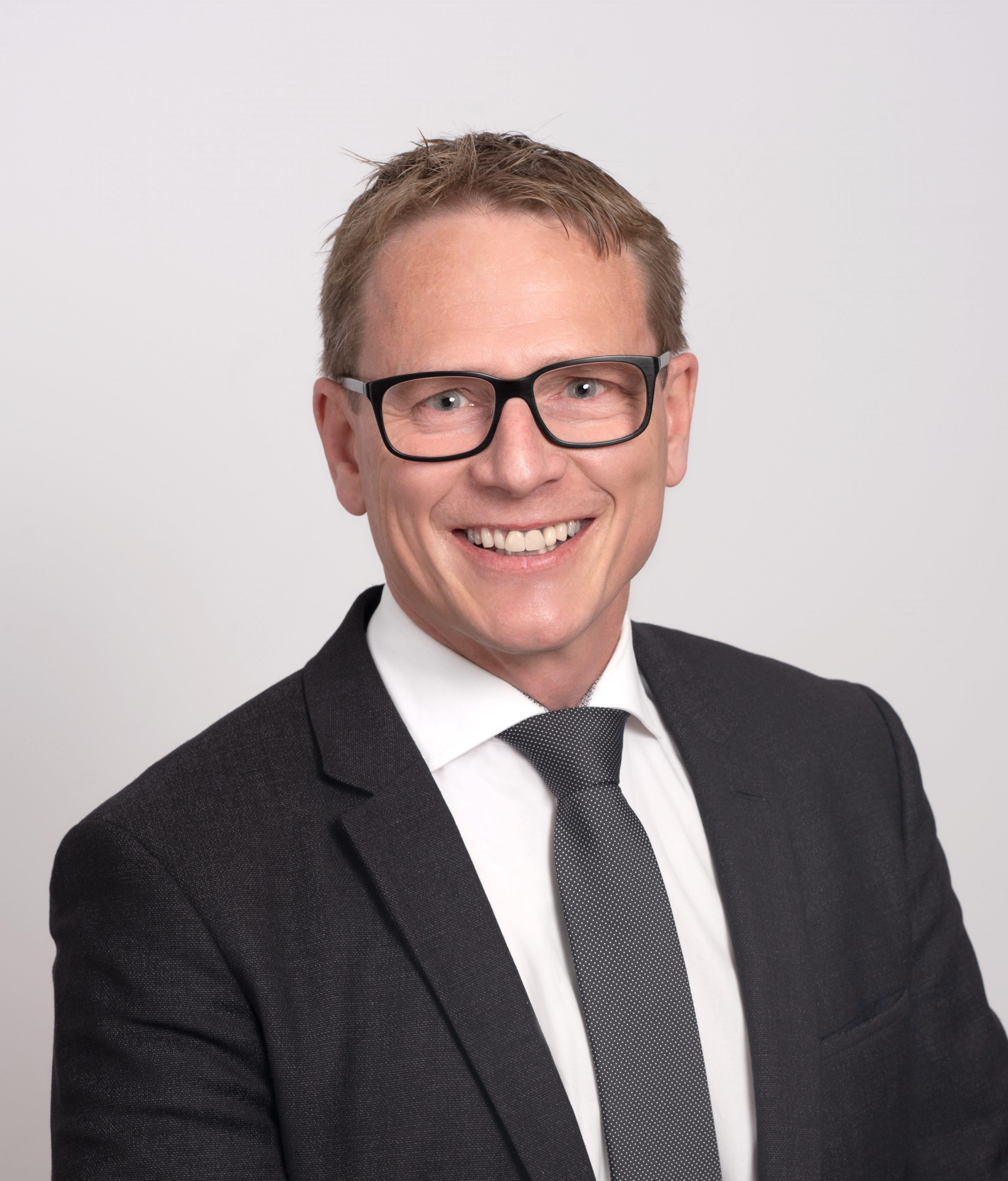

Member-elect of the National Council (Switzerland)
- Incumbent
- Assumed office 22 October 2023
- Constituency: Canton of Zürich

Member of the Cantonal Council of Zürich
- In office 18 May 2015 – 31 October 2023
- Succeeded by: Ruth Büchi-Vögeli

Personal details
- Born: Martin Hübscher; 15 March 1969 (age 57) Winterthur, Switzerland
- Party: Swiss People's Party
- Education: HAFL (Dipl.-Ing. Agr.)
- Occupation: Farmer; agriculturist; politician
- Website: Official website

Martin Hübscher (German pronunciation: [martɪn ˈhyːpʃər]; born 15 March 1969) is a Swiss farmer and politician who currently is a member-elect of the National Council (Switzerland) for the Swiss People's Party since 22 October 2023. He previously served as member of the Cantonal Council of Zürich representing the 15th District encompassing the Winterthur District between 2015 and 2023.
