= Vreni Spoerry =

Swiss attorney, business executive and politician (1938–2025)

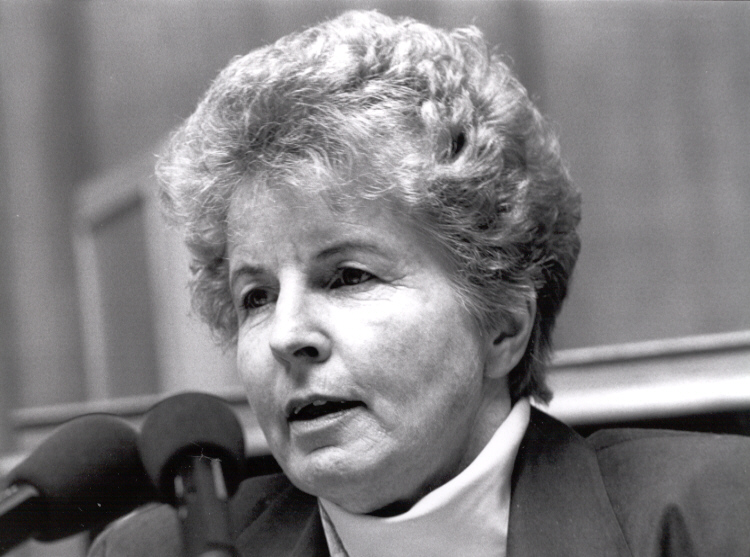
- Official portrait, 1994

Member of the Council of States (Switzerland)
- In office 4 March 1996 – 30 November 2003
- Constituency: Canton of Zürich

Member of the National Council (Switzerland)
- In office 28 November 1986 – 3 March 1996

Personal details
- Born: Verena Toneatti; 8 March 1938 Zürich, Switzerland
- Died: 29 May 2025 (aged 87)
- Spouse: Christoph Spoerry
- Children: 3
- Occupation: Attorney, business executive, professional board member, politician
- Website: Official website (archived); Parliament website

Verena "Vreni" Spoerry (née Toneatti; 8 March 1938 – 29 May 2025) was a Swiss attorney, business executive and politician who served on the Council of States (Switzerland) for the Free Democratic Party from 1996 to 2003. She previously served on the National Council of Switzerland from 1983 to 1996.

Spoerry was described as "Switzerland's most active professional board member" and held a variety of prestigious board memberships such as SKA (Credit Suisse), Nestlé, and Swissair. She was accused in the Swissair bankruptcy trial however was acquitted on all accounts.

== Early life and education ==
Spoerry was born Verena Toneatti on 8 March 1938 in Zürich, Switzerland, the youngest of three children, to Peter Toneatti (1899–1991) and Martha Toneatti (née Schmidhauser). Her father, a PhD graduate from ETH Zurich, founded a subsidiary of the construction company Toneatti Ltd., which was founded in 1889 by her paternal grandfather, Italian-born Giovanni Toneatti (1854–1929), who originally hailed from Udine. Her siblings include Martha Wettler (née Toneatti; born 1927) and Peter Toneatti Jr. (born 1929).

Spoerry was raised in Rapperswil-Jona on Lake Zurich, where she attended local schools. Upon completion of her commercial matriculation, she studied law and completed a licentiate degree at University of Zurich.

== Political career ==
Spoerry started her political career as municipal councilor (1978–1986) in Horgen, where she resided. She then served on the Cantonal Council of Zürich from 1979 to 1983 and ultimately on the National Council (Switzerland) from 1983 to 1996 and Council of States (Switzerland) from 1996 to 2003. She was a member of the Free Democratic Party (presently The Liberals).

== Personal life and death ==
She married Christoph Spoerry, a textile heir originally from Flums, with whom she had three children. Her son, Kaspar Spoerry (1968–1989), died aged 21 in a bicycle accident. In his name she and her husband formed the Kaspar-Spoerry-Foundation, a non-profit which supports athletics for people with special needs. She had two daughters and resided in Horgen, Switzerland.

Vreni Spoerry died on 29 May 2025, at the age of 87.
