= Georg Kohler (philosopher) =

Swiss philosopher and academic (born 1945)

- Born: 1945 (age 80–81); Konolfingen, Switzerland
- Spouse: Dominique Rub

Academic background
- Education: University of Zurich

Academic work
- Discipline: Political philosophy
- Institutions: LMU Munich; University of Zurich

Georg Kohler (born in Konolfingen, Bern, Switzerland in 1945) is a Swiss philosopher. He is a professor emeritus of Political Philosophy at University of Zurich. He is also a publicist and an author. He has written books on political philosophy and modern day Swiss politics and also collaborated with other writers including Hermann Lübbe.

Kohler's early education was in grammar schools. He then studied philosophy at the University of Zurich. In 1978, he completed his Licentiate degree of Jurisprudenz (law) from the University of Zurich. Until 1980, he held the post of Assistant of Philosophical Seminars at the university, but moved away to manage the family business in Vienna. He returned to teaching in 1992 and joined the Geschwister Scholl-Institute at LMU Munich. He left his post as the chairperson of philosophical research, and joined the University of Zurich in 1994 as a full professor after the retirement of his teacher Hermann Lübbe. He held the post until 2010, when he became a professor emeritus of Philosophy specializing in Political Philosophy.

Since 2008, he has been a speaker and a member of the trustees with the classical liberal think tank Liberales Institut. He frequently writes and gives interviews to newspapers and online publications, such as Neue Zürcher Zeitung, Blick and Tages-Anzeiger.

Kohler was married to Tagesschau spokeswoman and journalist Dominique Rub Kohler. She died on 15 August 2013.

== Notable works ==
=== Monographs ===
- Geschmacksurteil und ästhetische Erfahrung. Beiträge zur Auslegung von Kants "Kritik der ästhetischen Urteilskraft". Berlin: De Gruyter 1980.
- Handeln und Rechtfertigen. Untersuchungen zur Struktur der praktischen Rationalität. Frankfurt am Main: Athenäum 1988.
- Die Melancholie des Detektivs. Essays. Wien: Deuticke 1994.
- Über das Böse, das Glück und andere Rätsel. Zur Kunst des Philosophierens. Zürich: rüffer & Rub 2005, ISBN 978-3-907625-22-4.
- Bürgertugend und Willensnation. Über den Gemeinsinn und die Schweiz. Zürich: NZZ Libro 2010.
- Putins Schatten und die Idee der politischen Vernunft. Zur Zukunft nach dem Ende der Geschichte. Hamburg: Europäische Verlagsanstalt 2022, ISBN 978-3-86393-144-5.

=== As editor ===
- (with Alice Villon-Lechner): Die Schöne Kunst der Verschwendung – Fest und Feuerwerk in der europäischen Geschichte. Zürich: Artemis 1988, ISBN 3-7608-0732-1.
- (with Stefan Müller-Doohm): Wozu Adorno? Beiträge zur Kritik und zum Fortbestand einer Schlüsseltheorie des 20. Jahrhunderts. Weilerswist: Velbrück 2008.
- (with Felix Ghezzi): "Die Schweizermacher" und was die Schweiz ausmacht. Zürich: rüffer & rub 2016.

=== Articles ===
- Globale Gerechtigkeit und Weltordnung. In: Studia Philosophica Vol. 64/2005, S. 159–178.
- Entscheidungszwang, Unparteilichkeit, Fairness. Über das System des Rechts und die Tugend des Richters. In: NZZ, Literatur und Kunst, 17./18. Februar 2007, Nr. 40, S. 72.
- Über Otfried Höffe: Demokratie im Zeitalter der Globalisierung. In: Manfred Brocker (Hrsg.), Geschichte des politischen Denkens. Ein Handbuch. Frankfurt a. M: Suhrkamp 2007, S. 790–805. ISBN 978-3-518-29418-5,
- Suburbia und die Stadt am Schlossberg: Über städtische Lebensgefühle im Zeitalter der Globalisierung. In: Konrad Hummler, Franz Jaeger (Hrsg.), Stadtstaat – Utopie oder realistisches Modell? Zürich: Verlag Neue Zürcher Zeitung, 2011. ISBN 978-3-03823-708-2.

=== Literary works ===
- (with Claudia de Weck): Jakob, das Krokodil. Eine wahre Geschichte. Zürich: Atlantis 2013.
- Lichtwechsel. 51 Gedichte Zürich: rüffer & rub 2020, ISBN 978-3-906304-64-9.
