= International Secretariat of Brewery Workers =

The International Secretariat of Brewery Workers was a global union federation bringing together trade unions representing workers in breweries and mills which processed grains for brewing.

== History ==
The first international conference of brewery workers' trade unions was held in London in 1896, and it agreed to set up an office and co-ordinate some activities. However, several of the unions struggled to contribute to this effort, and no lasting international organisation was formed.

The next conference of brewery workers' trade unions was in 1908, and this did form a lasting secretariat, which from 1910 was located in Berlin, led by general secretary Martin Etzel. Its affiliates had a total of 130,000 members by 1912, and by the outbreak of World War I, the federation had affiliates in Austria, Belgium, Denmark, France, Germany, the Netherlands, Sweden, Switzerland, and the United States. The International Union of United Brewery Workmen of America was by far the largest affiliate, contributing around half the total membership.

In 1919, the secretariat responded to an appeal by the International Federation of Bakers, Pastry Cooks and Allied Workers' Associations to attend a conference to discuss a merger. The International Federation of Meat Workers also attended, and in August 1920, the brewery workers' international merged with these two organisations, to form the International Union of Food and Drink Workers' Associations.

== General Secretaries ==
1908: Martin Etzel
1914: Eduard Backert
