= American Bakery and Confectionery Workers' International Union =

Former labor union

The American Bakery and Confectionery Workers' International Union (ABC) was a labor union representing bakery workers in the United States.

In the 1950s, the Bakery and Confectionery Workers' International Union (B&C) was led by James G. Cross, who became embroiled in allegations of corruption. Cross refused to resign, and in December 1957 the AFL–CIO expelled the union. A substantial minority of B&C locals wished to remain part of the federation, and the AFL–CIO organized them as the ABC. The new union was led by president Daniel E. Conway, the former administrative director of the B&C; and secretary-treasurer Curtis Sims, who had filled the same role for the B&C.

The B&C attempted to retain control of its former locals' funds, leading to many legal battles. Despite this, more B&C locals defected to the ABC, ultimately totaling 60% of its original locals, and by 1967 the union had 83,000 members. By 1969, the B&C had a new leadership, and had resolved its issues with corruption. On December 4, 1969, the ABC merged back into the B&C, with Conway becoming its president.
