= Kantonsschule Zürcher Unterland =

Coordinates: 47.5183°N 8.5478°E

Kantonsschule Zürcher Unterland (KZU) is a Langzeit und Kurzzeit-Mittelschule in Bülach, Switzerland in the Zurich metropolitan area.
