= International Union of Food, Agricultural, Hotel, Restaurant, Catering, Tobacco and Allied Workers' Associations =

Global union federation

IUF
- International Union of Food, Agricultural, Hotel, Restaurant, Catering, Tobacco and Allied Workers' Associations
- Formation: 1920
- Merger of: International Federation of Bakers, Pastry Cooks and Allied Workers' Associations; International Federation of Brewery Workers; International Federation of Meat Workers
- Type: Trade union centre
- Headquarters: Geneva, Switzerland
- Members: 12 million
- President: Mark Lauritsen
- General secretary: Kristjan Bragason (acting)
- Website: iuf.org
- Formerly called: International Union of Food and Allied Workers' Associations (1920–1958); International Union of Food, Drinks and Tobacco Workers' Associations (1958–1961); International Union of Food, Agricultural, Hotel, Restaurant, Tobacco and Allied Workers' Associations (1961–1994)

The International Union of Food, Agricultural, Hotel, Restaurant, Catering, Tobacco and Allied Workers' Associations (IUF) is a global union federation of trade unions with members in a variety of industries, many of which relate to food processing.

== History ==
The federation was founded in 1920 with the merger of the International Federation of Bakers, Pastry Cooks and Allied Workers' Associations, the International Federation of Meat Workers, and the International Federation of Brewery Workers. Originally named the International Union of Food and Allied Workers' Associations (IUFAWA), its affiliates were all European until 1950, but it then rapidly expanded worldwide.

In 1958, the International Federation of Tobacco Workers merged into the federation, which renamed itself as the International Union of Food, Drinks and Tobacco Workers' Associations, then in 1961 the International Union of Hotel, Restaurant and Bar Workers merged in, and the federation became the International Union of Food, Agricultural, Hotel, Restaurant, Tobacco and Allied Workers' Associations (IUF). By 1978, the federation's affiliates had a total of 2.1 million members.

During the 1980s, the IUF campaigned against Coca-Cola following the assassination of union leaders in Guatemala. In 1988, the IUF was the first international trade union to sign a global framework agreement with the French food multinational BSN (Danone). In 1994, the International Federation of Plantation, Agricultural and Allied Workers merged into the IUF, which took its present name. In 2006, most of the former affiliates of the World Federation of Agriculture and Food Workers joined the federation.

== Current operations ==
In 2019, the IUF was composed of 422 member organisations in 127 countries, representing more than 10 million workers.

The organization represents workers employed in agriculture, the preparation and manufacture of food and beverages, hotels, restaurants and catering services and in tobacco processing.

The international headquarters of IUF is located in Geneva, Switzerland. Within the organization, there are autonomous regional organizations for Africa, Asia/Pacific, the Caribbean, Europe and Latin America.

== Leadership ==
=== General Secretaries ===
1920: Jean Schifferstein
1941: Hermann Leuenberger (acting)
1949: Juul Poulsen
1968: Dan Gallin
1997: Ron Oswald
2017: Sue Longley
2025: Kristjan Bragason (acting)

=== Presidents ===
1920: Max Wilhelm
1934: Robert Fischer
1939: Hermann Leuenberger
1949: Marius Madsen
1958: Hans Nätscher
1964: John Swift
1967: Henri Ceuppens
1970: Daniel E. Conway
1977: Sigvard Nyström
1981: Günter Döding
1989: Lage Andréasson
1993: Willy Vijverman
1997: Frank Hurt
2002: Paul Andela
2012: Hans-Olof Nilsson
2017: Mark Lauritsen
