= International Federation of Plantation and Agricultural Workers =

Organization

- Predecessor: Plantation Workers International Federation; International Landworkers' Federation
- Merged into: International Union of Food, Agricultural, Hotel, Restaurant, Catering, Tobacco and Allied Workers' Associations
- Founded: 2 Dec 1959
- Dissolved: 31 Dec 1993
- Headquarters: 17, Rue Necker, Geneva, Switzerland
- Members: 3 million (1994)
- Publication: IFPAAW Snips

The International Federation of Plantation and Agricultural Workers (IFPAAW) was a global union federation bringing together unions representing land workers.

== History ==
The federation was created on December 2, 1959, when the Plantation Workers International Federation (PWIF) merged with the International Landworkers' Federation (ILF). The ILF consisted of European unions representing agricultural workers, while the PWIF consisted of mostly workers on plantations in poorer countries, but also included some former affiliates of the defunct International Federation of Tobacco Workers.

By 1976, IFPAW claimed 3 million members, and maintained this level for the remainder of its existence. At some point, it changed its name slightly to the International Federation of Plantation, Agricultural and Allied Workers, while retaining the IFPAW abbreviation.

IFPAW pioneered collective bargaining at the international level in 1988, when it signed an agreement with Danone.

The federation merged into the International Union of Food and Allied Workers' Associations at 1 January 1994, which renamed itself as the International Union of Food, Agricultural, Hotel, Restaurant, Catering, Tobacco and Allied Workers' Association.

== Affiliates ==
In 1960, the following unions were affiliated to the federation:

Union	Country	Affiliated membership
All Trinidad Sugar Estates and Factory Workers Union	British West Indies Federation	7,000
Amalgamated Meat Cutters and Butcher Workmen of North America	United States	4,500
Barbados Workers' Union	British West Indies Federation	6,000
British Guiana Trades Union Council	British Guiana	Unknown
Cameroons Development Corporation Workers' Union	British Cameroons	14,000
Ceylon Workers' Congress	Ceylon	140,000
Danish Gardeners' Union	Denmark	5,302
Danish General and Special Workers' Union	Denmark	25,000
Eastern Region Development Corporation Workers' Union	Nigeria	2,700
Federation of Peasants and Rural Workers of Peru	Peru	1,000,000
General Union	Belgium	4,000
Grenada Manual and Mental Workers' Union	British West Indies Federation	10,000
Horticulture, Agriculture and Forestry Union	West Germany	85,000
Italian Federation of Agricultural Employees and Labourers	Italy	325,000
Italian Union of Land Workers	Italy	448,669
National Agrarian Federation	Costa Rica	1,500
National Federation of Agricultural Technicians and Employees	Italy	4,000
National Federation of Agricultural Workers	France	2,000
National Federation of Farmers	Colombia	12,000
National Federation of Sharecroppers and Smallholders	Italy	100,000
National Federation of Sugar Workers	Peru	25,000
National Union of Agricultural Workers	United Kingdom	125,000
National Union of Hired Agricultural Workers	Israel	200,000
National Union of Plantation Workers	Malaysia	140,000
National Workers Union	British West Indies Federation	8,000
General Dutch Industrial Union of Agriculture	Netherlands	39,962
Norwegian Union of Forestry and Land Workers	Norway	8,000
Plantation Workers' Federation of Vietnam	South Vietnam	26,000
Plantation Workers' Union	Mauritius	5,000
Rural Workers' Union	Finland	6,620
St Lucia Workers' Co-operative Union	British West Indies Federation	958
Swedish Agricultural Workers' Union	Sweden	29,925
Tanganyika Sisal and Plantation Workers' Union	Tanganyika	81,339
Tela Railroad Company Workers' Union	Honduras	Unknown
Transport and General Workers' Union	United Kingdom	6,000
Union of Agricultural and Forestry Workers	Austria	68,636
Union of Commerce, Transport and Food	Switzerland	1,010

== Leadership ==
=== General Secretaries ===
1960: Tom Bavin
1976: Stanley Correa
1982: José Vargas
1988: Börje Svensson

=== Presidents ===
1960: Harold Collison
1976: Tom Bavin
1982: Börje Svensson
1988: P. P. Narayanan
1992: Post vacant
