= Otto Braun =

German politician (1872–1955)

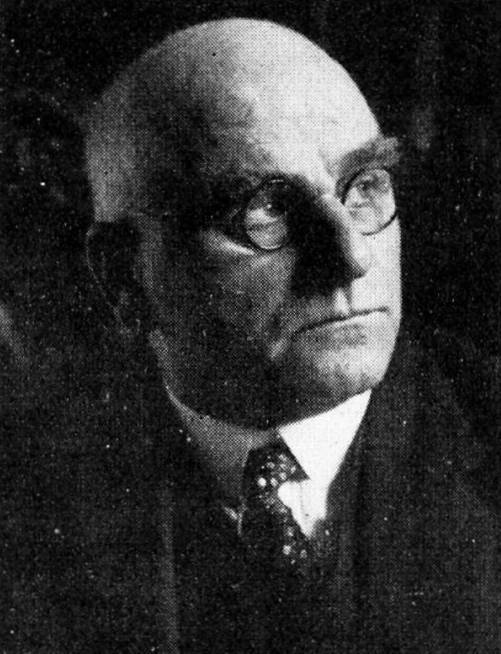
- Braun's official Landtag portrait, 1932

Minister President of Prussia
- In office 6 April 1925 – 20 July 1932
- Preceded by: Wilhelm Marx
- Succeeded by: Franz von Papen
- In office 5 November 1921 – 18 February 1925
- Preceded by: Adam Stegerwald
- Succeeded by: Wilhelm Marx
- In office 27 March 1920 – 21 April 1921
- Preceded by: Paul Hirsch
- Succeeded by: Adam Stegerwald

Minister of Finance of the Free State of Prussia
- In office 6 January 1925 – 18 February 1925
- Minister-President: Himself
- Preceded by: Paul von Eisenhart-Rothe
- Succeeded by: Hermann Warmbold

Minister of Agriculture of the Free State of Prussia
- In office 12 November 1918 – 21 April 1921
- Minister-President: Paul Hirsch; Himself
- Serving with: Adolf Hofer (1918–1919)
- Preceded by: Ernst von Richter
- Succeeded by: Hermann Höpker-Aschoff
Parliamentary constituencies
Member of the Reichstag for East Prussia
In office 24 June 1920 – 4 March 1933
Preceded by	Constituency established
Succeeded by	Constituency abolished
Member of the National Assembly for East Prussia
In office 6 February 1919 – 21 May 1920
Preceded by	Office established
Succeeded by	Office abolished
Member of the Landtag of Prussia for East Prussia
In office 18 May 1913 – 4 March 1933
Preceded by	Multi-member district
Succeeded by	Constituency abolished

Personal details
- Born: 28 January 1872 Königsberg, Province of Prussia, Kingdom of Prussia, German Empire (now Kaliningrad, Russia)
- Died: 15 December 1955 (aged 83) Locarno, Switzerland
- Party: Social Democratic Party of Germany
- Spouse: Emilie Podzius (m. 1894)
- Children: Erich
- Profession: Politician
- Other offices held: 1902: Member, Königsberg City Council

Otto Braun (28 January 1872 – 15 December 1955) was a politician of the Social Democratic Party of Germany (SPD) during the Weimar Republic. From 1920 to 1932, with only two brief interruptions, Braun was Minister President of the Free State of Prussia. The continuity of personnel in high office resulted in a largely stable government in Prussia, in contrast to the sometimes turbulent politics of the Reich. During his term of office, Prussia's public administration was reorganized along democratic lines. He replaced many monarchist officials with supporters of the Weimar Republic, strengthened and democratized the Prussian police, and made attempts to fight the rise of the Nazi Party.

On 20 July 1932, in the Prussian coup d'état (Preußenschlag), Reich Chancellor Franz von Papen ousted Braun's government from power following its loss of a parliamentary majority to the Nazis and the Communist Party of Germany. After Adolf Hitler seized power at the end of January 1933, Prussia lost its democratic constitution and Braun went into exile. After World War II, he had little or no political influence and was largely forgotten by the time he died in 1955.

== Life and character ==
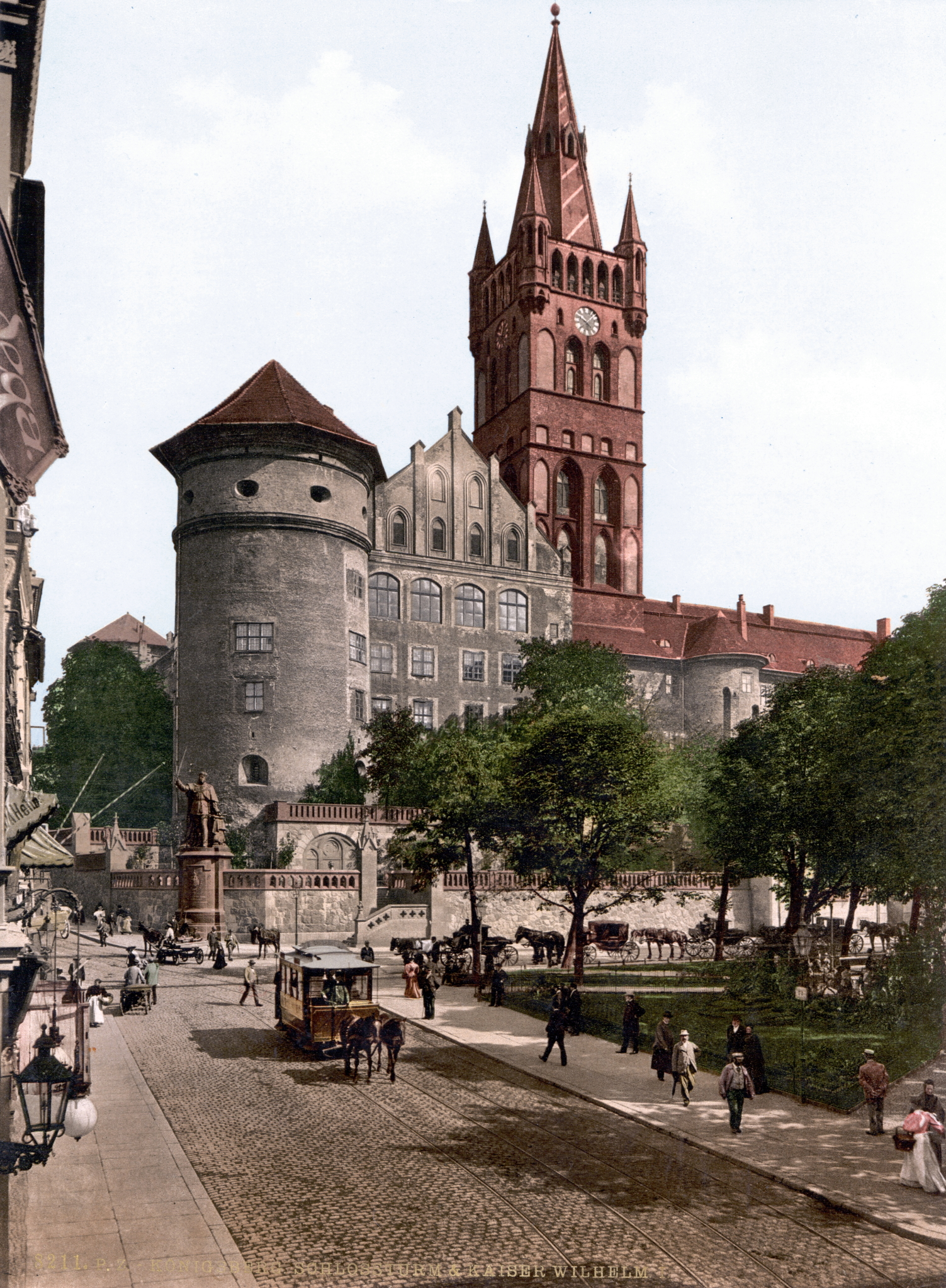
Königsberg in East Prussia (now Kaliningrad, Russia), where Braun was born and began his political career

Braun was born in Königsberg (now Kaliningrad, Russia), the capital and largest city of East Prussia. His father was originally a self-employed master shoemaker who ended his working life as a railroad lineman, a position then considered considerably lower socially. After a short period of schooling, Otto completed an apprenticeship as a lithographer.

Little information survives about his wife Emilie, née Podzius, who was one year older than Braun. He met her in the 1890s at a party function where he spoke, and they were married on 3 April 1894. During Braun's time as Minister President, Emilie never appeared in public. After she became terminally ill in 1927, the couple's life was largely confined to the house. According to eyewitness accounts, Braun cared for his wife devotedly; his flight to Switzerland in 1933 appears to have been primarily out of concern for her. Their only child, Erich, died of diphtheria in 1915 at the age of 21 as a volunteer in World War I. It was a loss that affected Braun deeply.

He was almost 1.9 meters tall (6 ft. 2 in.), broadly built, strong-willed, with a marked organizational talent and an ability to lead even complex groups. He thought and acted in a matter-of-fact, sober manner but lacked both rhetorical skill and the ability to excite his listeners with a rousing speech. His political pragmatism was always guided by a deep humanist conviction of people's right to freedom and political equality.

== In the SPD ==
In 1888, at the age of 16, Braun became involved with the SPD, which had been banned under the Anti-Socialist Laws of German Chancellor Otto von Bismarck. Influenced by anarcho-syndicalism – a view that revolutionary industrial unionism or syndicalism was a way for workers to gain control of a capitalist economy – he initially belonged to the party's left wing. He was chairman of the Königsberg Workers' Election Association, the local party's legal front, and later producer, editor and printer of various Social Democratic periodicals. In a region where several attempts by the SPD to establish a party newspaper had failed, Braun successfully founded the Volkstribüne, later the Königsberger Volkszeitung, with no start-up capital, minimal support from party leadership and under difficult sales conditions in a rural area dominated by large-scale agriculture.

During the period he was particularly involved with the agricultural workers of East Prussia, and as a result he became an expert on agricultural policy within the SPD as well as a lifelong opponent of the landed Junkers of East Elbia, the area of Germany to the east of the Elbe river. In a later work, Das ostelbische Landproletariat ('The East Elbian Rural Proletariat'), he wrote in his unwieldy prose:

The exploited, disenfranchised East Elbian rural population is the pedestal on which the preponderant share of the power of the East Elbian Junkers rests and, propped on it, drives the policies of robbery that starve and disenfranchise the people. But the more the pedestal succeeds in spreading Social Democratic principles among the population groups that form it, the more rotten it must become.

Braun was also co-founder of the German Agricultural Workers' Union, chairman of the local health insurance fund and a member of the Königsberg City Council.

In 1892, Braun received a two-month prison sentence for lèse-majesté. In November 1903, prosecutors accused him of exporting anarchist writings to Russia that called for the overthrow of Tsar Nicholas II. He was arrested, and in 1904 proceedings were instituted against him and eight other Social Democrats for high treason. Braun spent over five months in pretrial detention awaiting what came to be known as the "Königsberg secret society trial". Braun was defended by fellow East Prussian Social Democrat Hugo Haase, who in the process revealed the cooperation of the Prussian police with the Russian secret service Okhrana. The evidence against Braun was not considered substantive by the court, and he was acquitted.

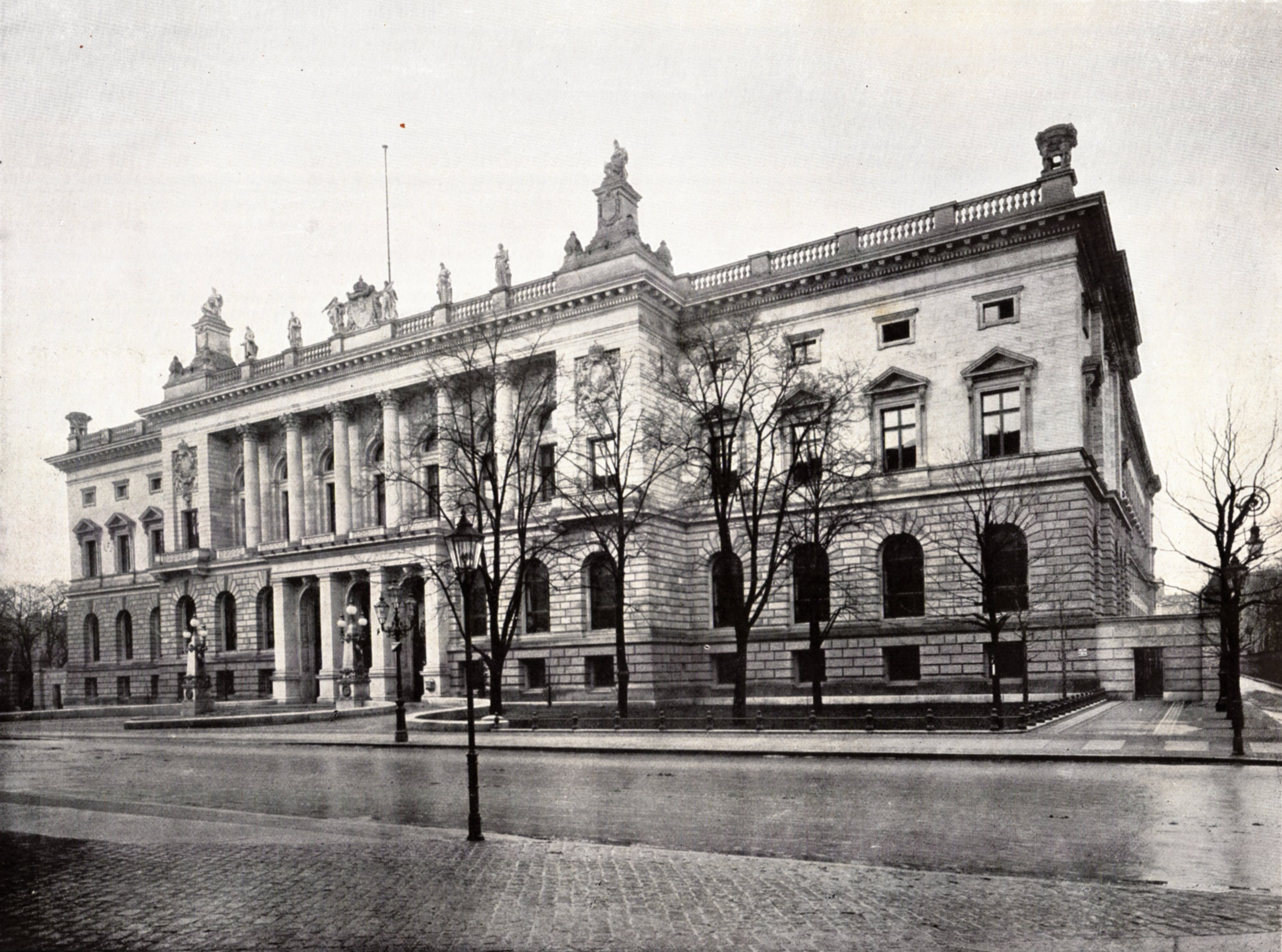
The Prussian House of Representatives in Berlin. Braun was a member from 1913 to 1933.

In 1898, Braun became chairman of the East Prussian SPD and in 1905 assumed his first party office at the Reich level as a member of the Control Commission. In 1911 he moved up to the Reich Executive Committee of the SPD as chief treasurer, where he remained until 1917. In 1913 he won a seat in the Prussian House of Representatives which he kept until 1933. Although he initially belonged to the left wing of the party, as an autodidact he was very different from the often highly educated Spartacists and Communists. He found their argumentation too unworldly, too theoretical and too little oriented toward practical and attainable goals. He once criticized Rosa Luxemburg for her "insufferable schoolmasterly manner". In 1895, commenting on discussions in the party about an agrarian program, he said that "for practical agitation the draft offers nothing. There, as in the whole debate, they argued doctoral questions." After the party rejected the draft, he said, "So let us leave our program, which has already helped us over many a mountain and led to many a victory, completely untouched for the time being, and let us not tinker around with it so much; that can lead to no good results. But it is different with our tactics, which on the basis of our program have to adapt naturally to the respective conditions in all locations."

During World War I, Braun sided with the SPD's more moderate wing that supported the Reichstag's Burgfriedenspolitik, which was intended to prevent domestic political disputes during the war. When the left wing of the SPD split off in 1917 to form the Independent Social Democratic Party of Germany (USPD), Braun stayed with the majority in the MSPD. He participated in the organization of the strike of January 1918, in which 400,000 workers, primarily in munitions plants, unsuccessfully went on strike. At the end of the war and the start of the German Revolution of 1918–1919, he became a representative of the MSPD on the Berlin Workers' and Soldiers' Council, which was set up on the pattern of Russian soviets. With Braun's concern about reliability and organizational efficiency, he was not happy in the council. Its majorities often changed, its composition was highly dependent on chance, and the discussions frequently did not revolve around practical issues but got lost in ideological debates about principles. Because of his experience with it he retained a lifelong aversion to "the wretchedness (Unwesen) of councils".

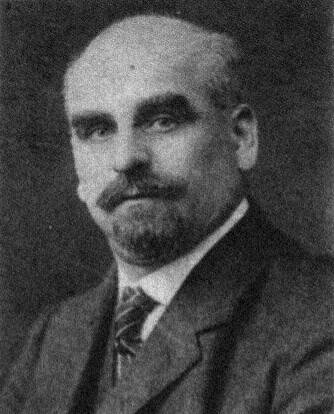
Braun's official National Assembly portrait, 1919

In 1919 and 1920, Braun was a member of the Weimar National Assembly, which was both the new Republic's interim parliament and the body that drafted and adopted the Weimar Constitution. From 1920 to 1933, he was a member of the German Reichstag. Due to conflicts of interest between the Reich and Prussia and because of Braun's often hands-on and unconventional manner, he and the SPD's party leadership became estranged, even though both the national and the Prussian parliaments were often governed by what came to be called the Weimar Coalition made up of the SPD, the centre-left German Democratic Party (DDP) and the centre-right Catholic Centre Party. While as a pragmatist, Braun focused his actions primarily on the interests of the coalition in Prussia and thus on the stability of the government, the SPD's own interests took precedence for the leadership of both the party and the Reichstag parliamentary group. Especially after the Majority Social Democratic Party and the USPD reunited in September 1922, conflicts often arose over the proper political course. Personal rivalries, especially between Braun and SPD party chairman Otto Wels, continued to worsen the climate and communications. Braun accused the SPD leadership of acting irresponsibly, and Wels thought that Braun's behaviour toward the party was reckless and that he lacked respect for Social Democratic principles.

== In the Prussian government ==
In 1918, after the fall of the monarchy, Braun became Prussia's Minister of Agriculture under Minister President Paul Hirsch. He opposed the breakup of Prussia that many were proposing following the war. In contrast to the ultra-conservative government of Bavaria, which was referred to as an Ordnungszelle ('cell of order'), he saw Prussia as Germany's democratic Ordnungszelle. He also feared that the dissolution of Prussia, which covered about two-thirds of Germany in area but was very inhomogeneous in composition, would strengthen the annexation demands of the victorious powers.

As Minister of Agriculture, he attempted an agrarian reform designed primarily to strip the great landowners east of the Elbe of their power. The centrepiece of his idea was a policy that would settle former soldiers on fallow lands. The soldiers would have obtained civilian employment, and at the same time the strained food situation in Germany would have improved. Fierce resistance from large-scale agriculturalists, Hirsch's hesitant stance, and the fact that Braun's plans ran counter to law caused them, for the most part, to fail.

When the Allied demands in the Treaty of Versailles became known on 7 May 1919, the outrage of the public and the political leadership was fierce. On 21 May 1919, Braun said in Lyck, East Prussia:

Never in the history of the world has such a shameless fraud been perpetrated on a people as this. ... The Prussian State Government and the Reich Government, in agreement with the entirety of the people's representatives, have taken the stand that the treaty is calculated to lead the German people into permanent slavery, and that it is therefore completely unacceptable to us and must not be signed.

=== Minister President ===
Braun was Prussian Minister President from March 1920 to March 1921, November 1921 to January 1925, and April 1925 to May 1932. Ironically, he became Minister President only because he seemed more dangerous to his opponents in the SPD as Minister of Agriculture, and they lobbied the other coalition parties to make him Minister President. He thus became the most powerful man in what was by far the largest and most populous state in the Weimar Republic.

Among the numerous problems Braun had to deal with were disputes with the large landowners and the nationalist-conservative German National People's Party (DNVP) that was allied with them; tensions over border and minority issues with Poland and the Polish minority in Prussia; and the 1923–1925 occupation of the Ruhr (which was part of Prussia) by troops from France and Belgium. His office was made more difficult by a conflict with Cologne Mayor Konrad Adenauer, chairman of the Prussian provincial council, over the status of the Rhine Province as part of the Prussian state. In addition, there was a clash with the House of Hohenzollern over their family property, which led to the failed referendum on the expropriation of the princes in 1926. Within the coalition, the Centre Party was the critical partner. During most of the period, it could have broken with the SPD and formed a right-wing coalition with the DNVP and the German People's Party (DVP), as it did several times at the Reich level.

=== Prussia as a "democratic bulwark" ===
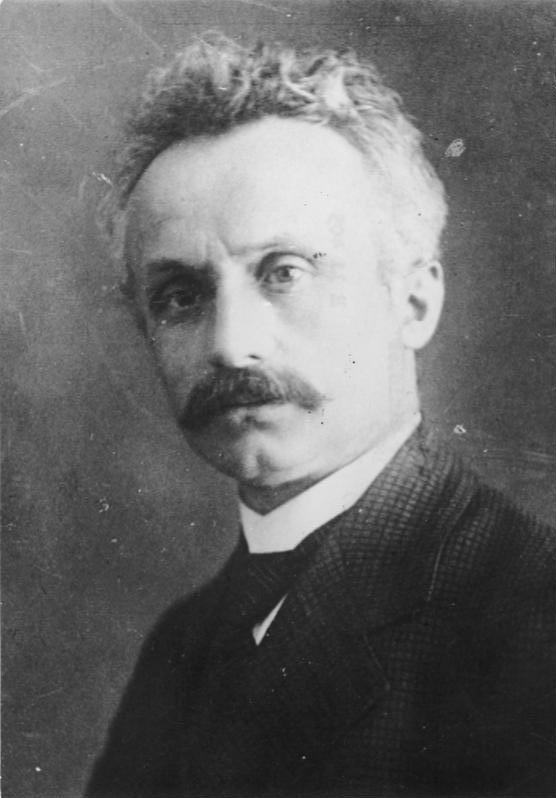
Carl Severing, who was one of the key Interior Ministers under Braun

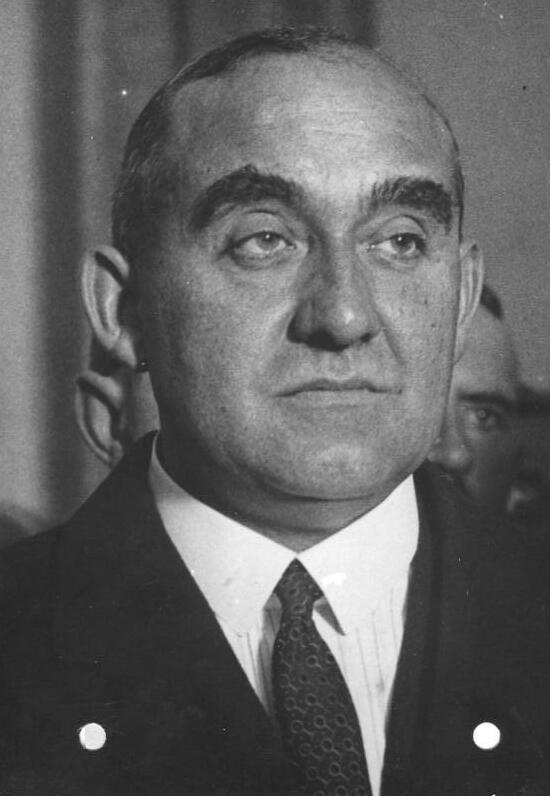
Albert Grzesinski, also Prussian Interior Minister and ally of Braun

Braun pursued ambitious policies amid the tense political environment. His greatest advantages over national politics were the favourable election results – the Weimar Coalition of SPD, Centre and DDP always retained a narrow majority in the Prussian House of Representatives – and the fact that under the Prussian constitution, the Minister President was elected by Parliament, which meant that unlike the German Chancellor, he could usually rely on a parliamentary majority. Ernst Heilmann (SPD) and Joseph Heß (Centre) made significant contributions to the cohesion of their respective parties in the government. Braun's most important allies were the state's two Social Democratic Interior Ministers, Carl Severing (1920–1926 and 1930–1932) and Albert Grzesinski (1927–1929).

The main points of conflict within the coalition were school policy and disputes over the appointment of civil servants. While the Centre Party favoured church-based denominational schools, the SPD and the DDP wanted state schools independent of religion. When it came to appointing civil servants, there were differences over whether it should be done based primarily on political-democratic considerations or on professional expertise, which, due to the recruitment of junior civil servants under the German Empire until 1919, resulted in a preponderance of conservative civil servants who were hostile to the Republic. Finally, the Centre and DDP frequently criticized Prussia's agricultural policy, which they thought was "full of socialist experiments".

Because of his authoritarian style of governing, Braun was sometimes referred to as the "Tsar of Prussia", but Prussia itself was considered a democratic stronghold under his leadership. German Chancellor Gustav Stresemann (DVP) described Prussia during the crises of 1923 as the "bulwark of German republicans". The historian Hajo Holborn wrote that Braun was not a social revolutionary but "a determined democratic reformer" and a shrewd coalition builder.

=== Reform policies ===
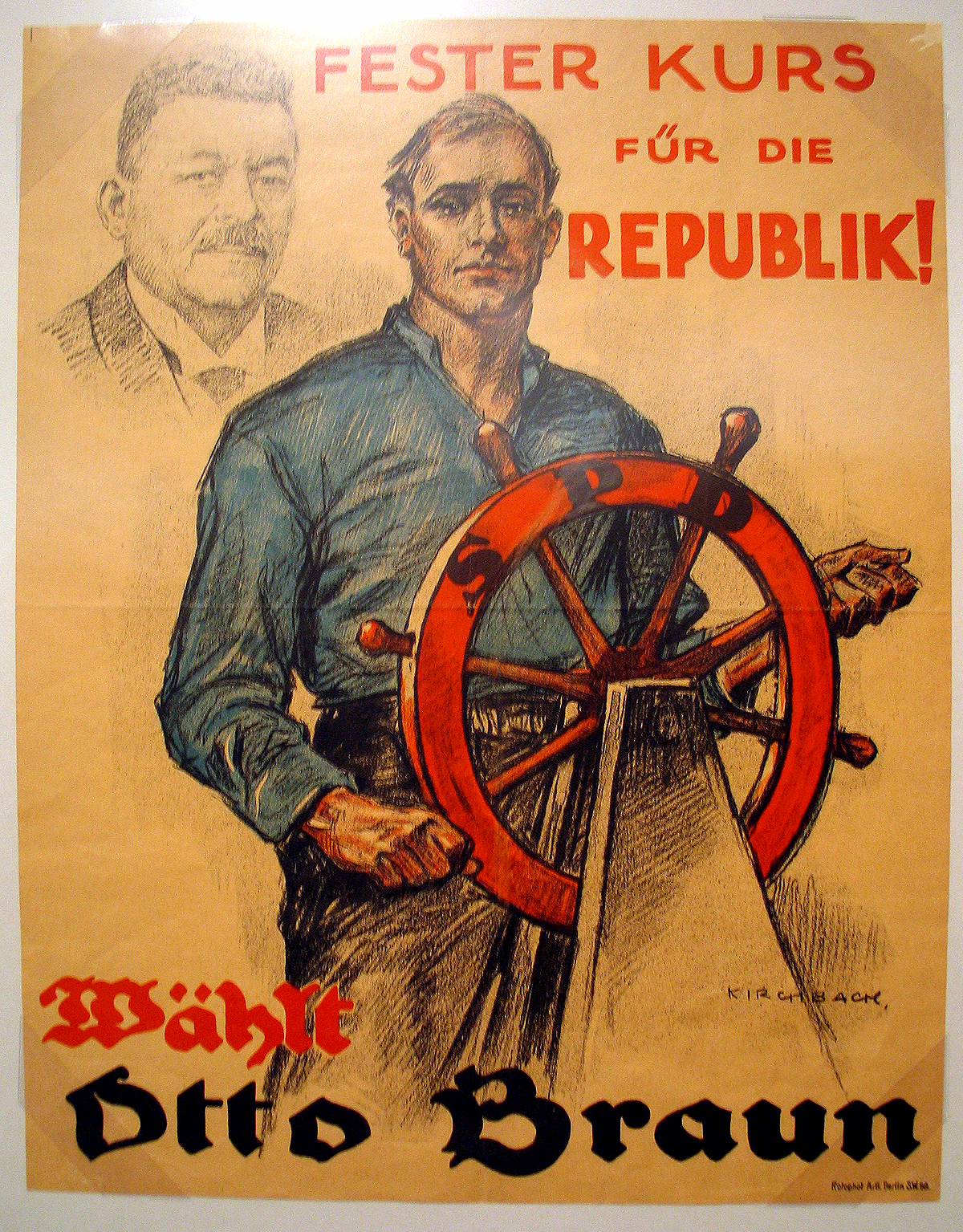
Campaign poster from the 1924 Prussian state election. It reads: "Fixed Course for the Republic! Vote for Otto Braun"

During Braun's term in office, land reform and a democratic reform of the school system were partially successful. Appointment of democrats to the civil service and especially the police force was one of the most important goals of Braun's government. Particularly after the failed 1920 Kapp Putsch, the Prussian government, unlike other German states, consistently took disciplinary measures against disloyal civil servants. Interior Minister Grzesinski summarized the government's program on the occasion of his inauguration late in 1926:

- fight enemies of the Republic
- consolidate state power, especially through the expansion of the police
- remove reactionary leading officials in the state administration and replace them with committed supporters of the Weimar Constitution, including from the broad strata of the people
- eliminate the still-existing privileges of the nobility in Prussia through the abolition of manor districts
- initiate and implement state and municipal administrative reform

Braun and Severing had replaced almost all Prussian governors (Oberpräsidenten), district presidents (Regierungspräsidenten), district administrators and police chiefs. After its reorganization by Wilhelm Abegg, the Prussian police force was considered one of the most important guarantors of the Weimar Republic. In the end, it was about 50,000 strong, predominantly republican-minded, and part of it trained paramilitarily. It also knew how to respond effectively during the periods of street fighting that became frequent in the late 1920s and early 1930s.

Since there were few supporters of democracy who already had civil service training or extensive experience in office, the restaffing could only be partially carried out. Especially below the immediate leadership level, the government had to leave many officials loyal to the monarchy in office. Conservative and bourgeois parties in particular strongly opposed political reassignments, although both the DDP and the DVP were awarded an above-average number of posts in the administration's governing bodies. The reintegration of the DVP into the Prussian government failed several times, mainly due to this issue.

=== 1925 presidential election ===
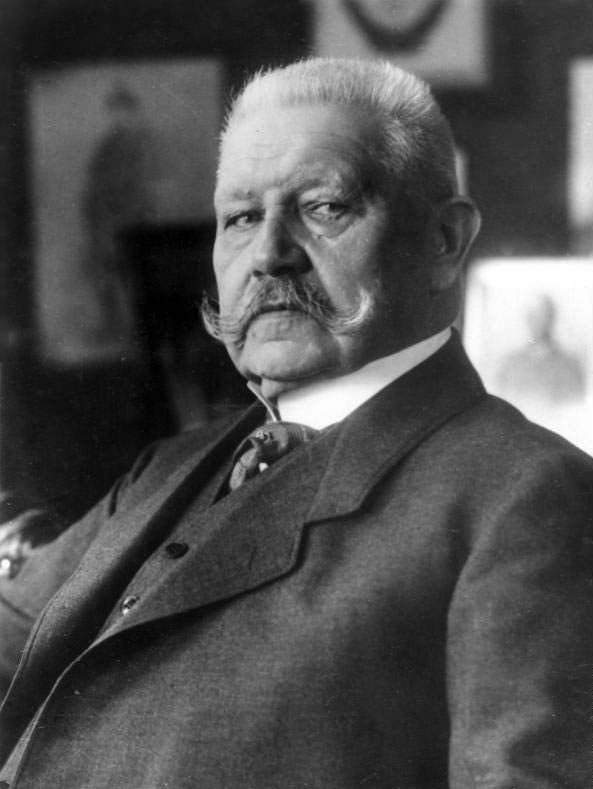
Paul von Hindenburg, against whom Braun ran unsuccessfully in the 1925 presidential election

In the 1925 German presidential election, Braun campaigned to succeed Friedrich Ebert as President of the Reich, running against the Centre Party's Wilhelm Marx, Karl Jarres of the DVP and Ernst Thälmann of the Communist Party of Germany (KPD). The Social Democrats were counting on a leadership figure known throughout Germany who was similar to Ebert in mentality. In the first round of voting, Braun received 29 per cent of the vote, a considerably better result than the SPD's 20.5% in the previous Reichstag election. Because the Centre Party refused to support a Social Democratic candidate on the second ballot, Braun withdrew in favour of Marx. He was no more successful than Braun in appealing to conservative voters and lost to Paul von Hindenburg.

=== End of the Weimar Republic ===
Braun initially had a good relationship with President Hindenburg, something that was surprising both to observers and to the two men themselves. The Minister President, who topped the tall field marshal by a hand's breadth, was also one of the few men who symbolically met Hindenburg eye to eye. The two found common conversational ground in their mutual passion for hunting in East Prussia. Hindenburg viewed Braun as a politician who thought not so much in terms of ideological subtleties but instead, within certain basic convictions, was open and pragmatically oriented toward day-to-day politics. After their first meeting, Hindenburg said, "My friends… had told me that Otto Braun was a fanatical rabble-rouser. Now I see that he is a quite reasonable person with whom one can talk about everything."

Over the long term, however, Braun was unable to hold out against Hindenburg's inner circle. The trust between the two men was lost for good in October 1929 after Braun banned the Rhineland chapter of Der Stahlhelm, a veteran's organization that served as the paramilitary body of the right-wing DNVP. The ban left Hindenburg, an honorary member of the association who took Braun's action personally, ready to back drastic action against him and the Prussian government.

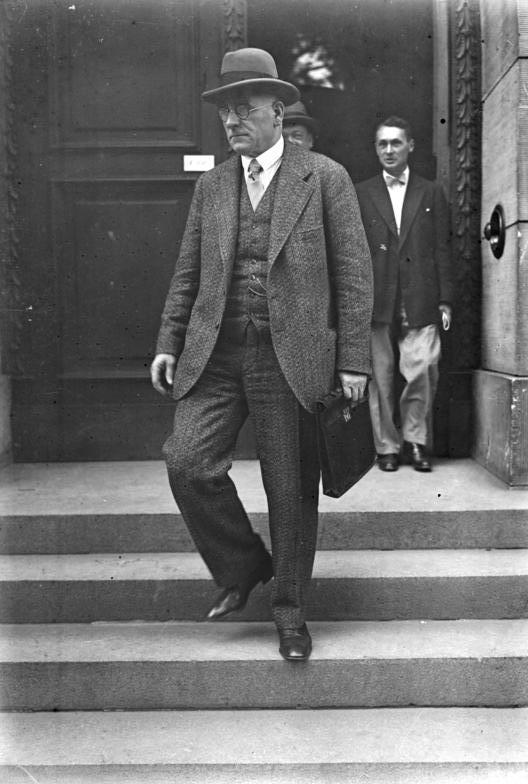
Braun leaving the Reichstag after its dissolution, 1930

In the final phase of the Weimar Republic, Braun tried to take action against the rising Nazi Party (NSDAP). In addition to banning the Rhineland Stahlhelm, he worked with the Prussian police and Interior Ministers Albert Grzesinski and then Carl Severing to enforce a nationwide ban on the Sturmabteilung (SA), the Nazi Party's paramilitary wing. The Staatsschutz (state security) worked comparatively purposefully and successfully against the NSDAP, but both its powers and options were limited. After the failure in March 1930 of the grand coalition led by Hermann Müller (SPD) in the German Parliament, the SPD in the Reichstag for the most part supported the government of Heinrich Brüning (Centre), primarily so that the Centre Party in Prussia would continue to support Braun, and the Prussian police could therefore remain under the command of democrats.

Braun's majority in the Prussian Parliament had slowly dwindled, especially since the opponents of the Republic had been able to cooperate to work against the government. In 1930 the DNVP and Communists (KPD) introduced a joint motion of no confidence, and in 1931 the Stahlhelm, with the support of the NSDAP, DNVP, DVP and KPD, attempted to pass a popular referendum to remove the government in Prussia. Both measures failed.

=== Removal from office ===
In the election of 24 April 1932, the Weimar coalition for the first time fell short of a majority in a Prussian state election. Under the Prussian constitution, an incumbent government could not be deposed unless a prospective successor already commanded a majority. That measure, the constructive vote of no confidence, was intended to ensure that a government had sufficient support to govern. In 1932 neither the Communists nor the National Socialists would support the governing coalition, but neither of them could muster sufficient support to form a government in their own right, and they would not consider working with each other. As a result, Braun and his cabinet, after formally submitting their resignations, remained in office on a caretaker basis in accordance with Article 59 of the state constitution.

After the strains of the election campaign, Braun had a physical breakdown on the night of April 22–23. When it became clear that his government would remain in office, he turned the handling of day-to-day affairs over to Heinrich Hirtsiefer, the Centre Party Minister of Public Welfare, and withdrew to rest and recuperate.

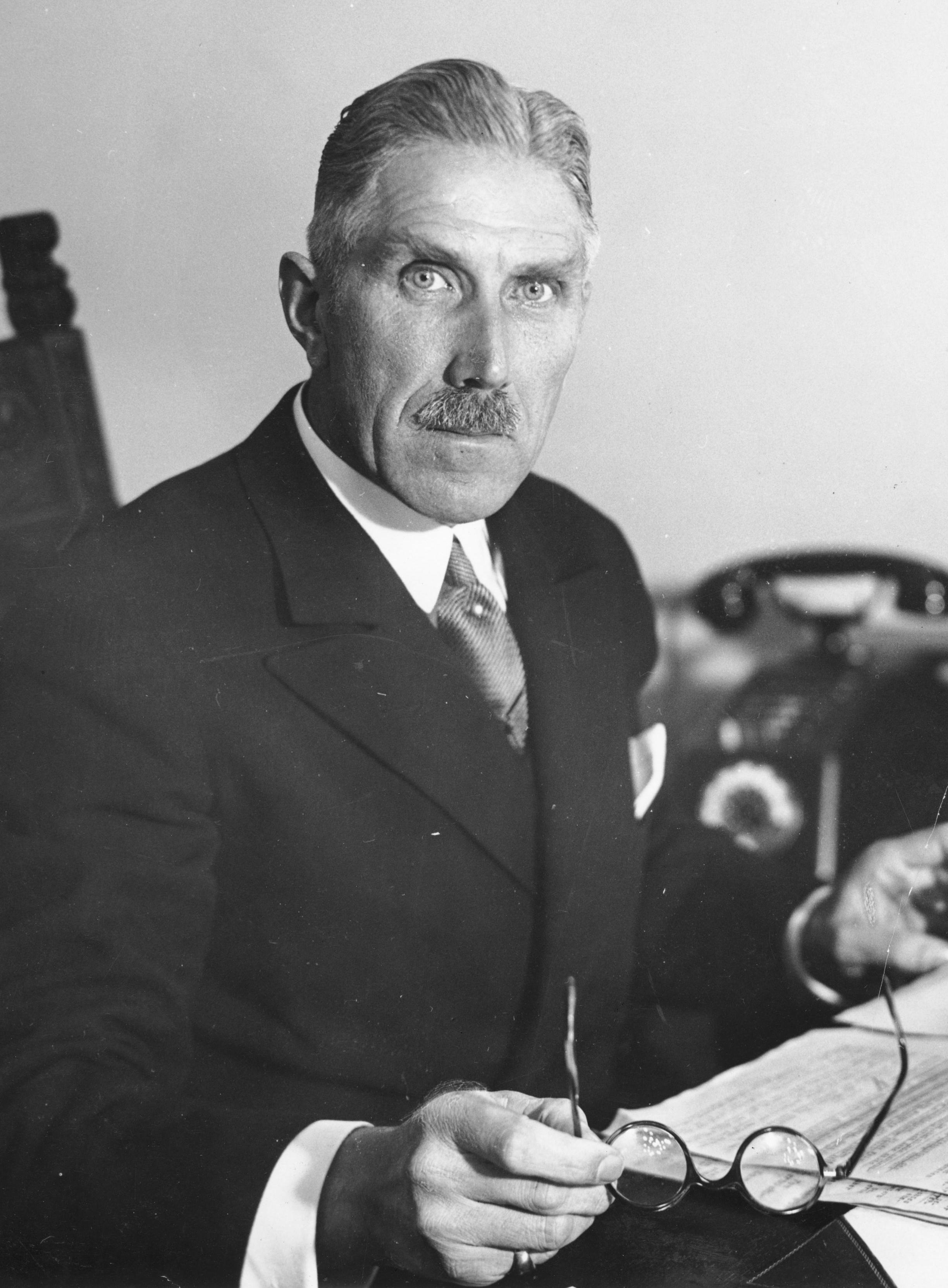
Franz von Papen, who initiated the coup that made him Reich Commissioner of Prussia

In an attempt to break the parliamentary stalemate and remove the Braun government from office, Reich Chancellor Franz von Papen, with the approval of President Hindenburg, initiated the 1932 Prussian coup d'état on 20 July. It replaced Prussia's legal government with von Papen as Reich Commissioner and gave executive power to the Reich Minister of the Armed Forces Kurt von Schleicher. Braun remained in Berlin and prepared a legal complaint to the Staatsgerichtshof (State Constitutional Court) of the Reichsgericht (Reich Court of Justice) on behalf of the Prussian state government.

In the SPD's poor election results and Braun's ill health, Papen had found an opportunity to eliminate the most important power centre of the republican parties in Germany. The immediate pretext was provided by the Altona Bloody Sunday, a clash in Altona (near Hamburg) between the Nazi SA, Communists and the police that left 18 dead. It provided the rationale for a Reichsexekution, a constitutionally sanctioned intervention by the federal government against a member state, to be presented as a necessary step toward restoring peace and order. Although Braun officially remained Minister President, his powers were transferred to Papen as Reichskommissar.

On 25 July the State Constitutional Court refused to issue an injunction against Hindenburg's "Emergency Decree concerning the restoration of public safety and order in the territory of Prussia". Braun then spent the summer on a recuperative vacation in Bad Gastein, Austria and Ascona in Switzerland. In mid-October, he was back in Berlin, and on 25 October the State Court ruled in "Prussia versus the Reich" that the measures taken by Papen and Hindenburg had not been lawful, but that the result had to be accepted. Braun's government continued to retain its constitutional rights with respect to the Prussian Landtag, the Reichsrat – the upper house of the German Parliament that represented the interest of the states – and the Reich government. Talks with Papen and Hindenburg on 29 October brought no progress. Braun was legally still Minister President of Prussia, but his only power lay in presiding over meaningless meetings of his cabinet, now called a "sovereign government" (Hoheitsregierung), and in representing Prussia in the Reichsrat, while Reich Commissioner Papen was rapidly erasing the reforms of the previous twelve years. The appointment of Kurt von Schleicher as Reichskommissar brought no significant changes. It was not until Adolf Hitler seized power in 1933 that Hermann Göring, with Papen's help, secured a new emergency decree from Hindenburg that officially deposed Braun's "sovereign government". His response was again limited to filing a complaint with the State Constitutional Court on 7 February 1933.

The events following the 27 February 1933 Reichstag fire and warnings that his life was threatened induced Braun to flee Germany. On 4 March, he set off by car across the border to Austria. The SPD party leadership did not forgive him for his flight, which became known before the polling stations closed for the March 5 election for the Prussian Parliament and the German Reichstag. It seemed to them to be a desertion, with perhaps disastrous consequences for the election results and a demoralizing effect on the defenders of the Republic. There was practically no contact between Braun and the party leadership in exile, the Sopade.

Afterwards, Braun was often reproached for surrendering without a fight and not calling a general strike or attempting to regain his powers with the help of the Prussian uniformed police, which at the time numbered 50,000 men. Braun's behaviour during the Prussian coup d'état in particular symbolized the helplessness of the democratic forces in the face of an enemy that felt bound neither by order nor by existing law. He considered a more active approach futile in view of the political-military balance of power in 1932. In his opinion, it would only have caused unnecessary bloodshed.

== In exile ==
After Braun had been warned by men close to the Reich President of a wave of arrests, he fled to Ascona in Switzerland, which he already knew as a vacation spot. In Switzerland, he was forbidden any political activity as well as gainful employment. He had been able to save most of his assets, but, confident that he would be paid his pension as Prussian Minister President, he had spent it on a plot of land with a house and even taken out a mortgage. After it became clear that he would have to get by with almost no money, Braun, in depression, withdrew into gardening and thus the nature he loved. He wrote in a letter that he was brooding over the "whole misery of my wretched existence" and that he was asking himself, "How am I, as a 62-year-old worn out man whose freedom of movement is severely hampered by my paralyzed wife, supposed to create a new existence for myself under today's conditions?" Although it seemed implausible to the Gestapo that the "Red Tsar of Prussia" was content to grow potatoes in exile, they found no convincing evidence to the contrary.

In the summer of 1937, a lawyer attempted to collect five hundred marks in debt from Braun. He tried unsuccessfully to rent or sell his house, but fearing the bailiff, he finally left Switzerland. In Paris, he had his first close contact with the SPD in exile and showed a constant manic compulsion to justify himself. His friends were able to persuade him to write his memoirs. Braun buried himself in documents, and by 1938 the manuscript for Von Weimar zu Hitler ('From Weimar to Hitler') was completed. His political testament appeared in 1940, greatly abridged because of Swiss censorship.

He was at that point able to rent out his house in Ascona at a good price. It allowed him to move back to Switzerland and live there, relieved of at least the worst of his financial worries until the outbreak of the war. Then things went downhill again; no tenant could be found, so Braun had to move back into his house without any income. His book did not bring in enough to even pay the mortgage interest on his house. In the summer of 1941, he sold his watch and "other expendable things that could be turned into money". He spent much of the time in bed suffering from attacks of rheumatism. To his closest confidant Herbert Weichmann, he wrote, "When many weeks I wander from table to table like a beggar student, I can hardly help feeling depressed".

It was the former Reichstag member Heinrich Georg Ritzel who brought Braun back into social and political life. He established contact with the Bavarian Social Democrat Wilhelm Hoegner and the former Reich Chancellor Joseph Wirth. Together they drew up plans for a possible postwar order, but Braun's attempt to have the Allies reinstate the previous democratic Prussian government failed because they had decided to abolish Prussia. Ritzel arranged modest financial support from the Swiss Workers' Relief Agency so that Braun at least no longer had to beg.

== Post-war ==
Although he had been one of the most powerful men of the Weimar Republic, Braun largely disappeared from public memory after World War II. His ideas about post-war politics failed to attract interest. Neither his political views nor what he symbolized fit into the changed situation in Germany. The old Free State of Prussia was divided between the Federal Republic of Germany, the German Democratic Republic, Poland and the Soviet Union, and the idea of a genuinely democratic and republican socialism increasingly contradicted both the West's and the East's Cold War political ideas. In the Soviet Occupation Zone and later East Germany, both as a Social Democrat and as a Prussian, he was too close to what was called revanchism to be appreciated. In West Germany, Konrad Adenauer, Braun's longtime domestic political adversary and a staunch opponent of both Prussianism and socialism, dominated the government for many years. In addition, Braun's commitment to the Weimar Republic was long overshadowed by his ultimate political failure and general passivity during the Prussian coup d'état. Otto Braun died in Locarno, Switzerland, on 15 December 1955.

It was not until the 1970s that historians began to take an interest in Otto Braun again. Hagen Schulze wrote a comprehensive biography of him in 1977 (see Further Reading).

== Legacy ==
In 1995, Hans-Beimler-Straße (Hans Beimler Street) in the former East Berlin was renamed Otto-Braun-Straße by the Berlin authorities.

Preceded by Paul Hirsch	Minister President of Prussia; 1920–1921	Succeeded by Adam Stegerwald
Preceded by Adam Stegerwald	Minister President of Prussia; 1921–1925	Succeeded by Wilhelm Marx
Preceded by Wilhelm Marx	Minister President of Prussia; 1925–1932	Succeeded by Franz von Papen
