= Federation of Entertainment and Information =

Trade union of Italy

The Federation of Entertainment and Information (Italian: Federazione Informazione e Spettacolo, FIS) was a trade union representing workers in the printing, audio-visual and entertainment industries in Italy.

The union was founded in 1985, when the Italian Federation of Book Workers merged with the United Federation of Entertainment Workers. Like both its predecessors, it affiliated to the Italian Confederation of Workers' Trade Unions (CISL). As of 1991, the union was led by Giuseppe Surrenti, and claimed 43,388 members.

In 1997, the union merged with the Union of Telecommunications, to form the Federation of Entertainment, Information and Telecommunications.
