= Mehmet Yıldız =

Mehmet Yıldız may refer to the following people:

- Mehmet Yıldız (footballer)
- Mehmet Yıldız (politician)
