= Federation of Energy, Resource, Chemical and Related Workers =

Trade union of Italy

The Federation of Energy, Resource, Chemical and Related Workers (Italian: Federazione Lavoratori Energia Risorse Chimica Affini, FLERICA) was a trade union representing industrial workers in Italy.

The union was founded in 1981, when the Federation of Chemistry merged with the Federation of Energy. Like both its predecessors, it affiliated to the Italian Confederation of Workers' Trade Unions. By 1998, it had 82,071 members, of whom half worked in mining and quarrying, 30% in chemicals, and the remainder in gas and water supply.

In 2001, the union merged with the Italian Federation of Textile and Clothing Workers, to form the Federation of Energy, Fashion, Chemistry and Related Workers.
