= International Landworkers' Federation =

Former international trade union

The International Landworkers' Federation (ILF) was a global union federation bringing together trade unions representing agricultural and forestry workers.

== History ==
The federation was established in 1920 at a conference in Amsterdam, and set up its headquarters in Utrecht. In 1924, it relocated to Berlin, but returned to Utrecht in 1933. By 1925, it had 15 affiliates, with a total of 377,800 members, and by 1954 this had grown to more than 1,000,000 members, principally in Europe.

In 1960, the federation merged with the Plantation Workers International Federation, which mostly represented workers on plantations in poorer countries, forming the International Federation of Plantation and Agricultural Workers.

== Affiliates ==
In 1954, the following unions were affiliated to the federation:

Union	Country	Affiliated membership
Agricultural Labourers' Union	Israel	120,000
Danish Gardeners' Union	Denmark	5,213
Danish General Workers' Union	Denmark	35,000
General Dutch Industrial Union of Agriculture	Netherlands	39,800
General Union of Workers in Building, Household and Related Occupations	Belgium	2,000
Horticulture, Agriculture and Forestry Union	West Germany	115,000
Italian Federation of Agricultural Employees and Labourers	Italy	325,000
Italian Union of Land Workers	Italy	140,000
Likomba Plantation Workers' Union	British Cameroons	3,000
National Agricultural Workers' Union	United States	8,500
National Federation of Free Agricultural Technicians and Employees	Italy	4,000
National Union of Agricultural Workers	United Kingdom	135,000
Norwegian Union of Forestry and Land Workers	Norway	8,000
Rural Workers' Union	Finland	14,000
Swedish Agricultural Workers' Union	Sweden	41,171
Transport and General Workers' Union	United Kingdom	9,000
Union of Agricultural Workers	France	2,000
Union of Commerce, Transport and Food	Switzerland	1,300
Union of Employees in Governmental Enterprises	Saarland	236
Union of Agricultural and Forestry Workers	Austria	69,186

== Leadership ==
=== General Secretaries ===
1920: Piet Hiemstra
1924: Georg Schmidt
1933: Piet Hiemstra
1938: Oscar Levinsen
1942: Walter Kwasnik
1950: Adri de Ruijter

=== Presidents ===
1920: Walter Smith
1924: Joseph Forbes Duncan
1950: Edwin Gooch
