= Scuola =

Scuola ('school' in Italian; plural scuole) is part of the name of many primary and secondary schools in Italy, Italian-language schools abroad, and institutes of tertiary education in Italy. Those are not listed in this disambiguation article. It may also refer to:

== Associations ==
- The Scuole Grandi of Venice, religious confraternities with art collections
- The Scuole Piccole of Venice, religious confraternities

== Artistic movements ==
- Scuola Romana or Scuola di via Cavour, a 20th-century art movement in Rome
- Giovane scuola, a group of Italian composers of the late 19th and early 20th centuries

== Other ==
- La scuola, 1995 Italian film
- CISL Scuola, Italian labor union for teachers
