= German Agricultural Workers' Union =

Former German Reich trade union (1919–1933)

- Deutscher Landarbeiter-Verband
- Predecessor: Union of Factory, Agricultural and Commercial Support Workers in Germany
- Successor: Union of Land, Food and Forests (E Germany), Horticulture, Agriculture and Forestry Union (W Germany)
- Founded: 1909
- Dissolved: May 2, 1933
- Headquarters: 6 Enckestraße, Berlin
- Location: Germany
- Members: 151,273 (1928)
- Key people: Georg Schmidt (President)
- Publication: Der Landarbeiter
- Affiliations: ADGB, ILF

The German Agricultural Workers' Union (German: Deutscher Landarbeiter-Verband, DLV) was a trade union representing agricultural and forestry workers in Germany.

From 1890, agricultural workers in Germany were represented by the Union of Factory, Agricultural and Commercial Support Workers in Germany, a general union. However, that organisation wished to move towards becoming an industrial union, and the General Commission of German Trade Unions felt it would be better for agricultural workers to have their own organisation.

The Union of Agricultural, Forest and Vineyard Workers of Germany was founded in 1909, under the leadership of Georg Schmidt, who had previously been the leader of the small Union of Gardeners and Nursery Workers. It became the "German Agricultural Workers' Union" in 1912. By 1928, the union had 151,273 members. In 1933, it was banned by the Nazis, and after World War II, it was replaced by the Horticulture, Agriculture and Forestry Union.
