= FILC =

FILC or Filc may refer to:

== Organisations ==
- Italian Federation of Chemical Workers (Italian: Federazione Italiana Lavoratori Chimici), a former trade union
- Italian Federation of Hat Workers (Italian: Federazione italiana lavoranti cappellai), a former trade union
- International Federation of Celtic Wrestling, in wrestling

== Other uses ==
- Marián Filc (1948–1993), Slovak figure skater who competed for Czechoslovakia
