= Annamaria Furlan =

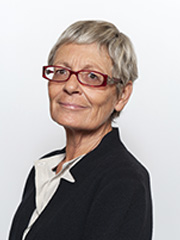

General Secretary of CISL
- In office 8 October 2014 – 16 February 2021
- Preceded by: Raffaele Bonanni
- Succeeded by: Luigi Sbarra

Member of the Senate
- Incumbent
- Assumed office 13 October 2022
- Constituency: Sicily

Personal details
- Born: 24 April 1958 (age 67); Genoa, Italy
- Political party: Centre-left independent
- Profession: Trade unionist

Annamaria Furlan (born 24 April 1958) is an Italian trade unionist and former General Secretary of the CISL.

== Biography ==
Furlan began her trade union career in Genoa in 1980. In 1990, she took on the role of Organizational Secretary of the CISL Liguria and subsequently in 1997 you were elected Secretary General of the CISL of Genoa. From 2000 to 2002 she was held the office Secretary General of the Ligurian CISL, while from 2014 to 2021 she has been National Secretary General of CISL.

At the 2022 Italian election, Furlan has been elected Senator of the Republic as a centre-left independent in the Democratic Party - Democratic and Progressive Italy list.
