= National Federation of Sharecroppers and Smallholders =

Trade union of Italy

The National Federation of Sharecroppers and Smallholders (Italian: Federazione Italiana Coltivatori Diretti, Coloni e Mezzadri, Federcoltivatori) was a trade union representing self-employed farmers in Italy.

The union was established in 1950 and affiliated to the Italian Confederation of Workers' Trade Unions, and the International Federation of Plantation and Agricultural Workers. For many years, it was led by Carlo Ceruti.

Membership of the union was 102,688 in 1954, and 114,983 in 1982. The following year, it became part of the new General Union of Growers.
