= Federation of Chemistry =

Trade union of Italy

The Federation of Chemistry (Italian: Federazione Chimici, Federchimi) was a trade union representing workers in chemical and related industries in Italy.

The union was founded in 1950, as the Federation of Chemical, Oil and Gas Workers, by Christian democrats who had recently left the Italian Federation of Chemical Workers. It claimed 44,239 members in 1954. By 1957, it was the Federation of Chemical and Petroleum Workers, with four affiliates: the Union of Chemical Workers, the Union of Oil and Gas Workers, the National Union of Glass and Ceramic Workers, and the National Union of Nuclear Industry Workers. It affiliated to the Italian Confederation of Workers' Trade Unions, and to the International Federation of Chemical and General Workers' Unions.

By 1981, the union had 114,415 members. That year, it merged with the Federation of Energy, to form the Federation of Energy, Resource, Chemical and Related Workers.
