= Agricultural Labourers' Union =

Trade union

The Agricultural Labourers' Union (Hebrew: הסתדרות הפועלים החקלאיים, Histadrut HaPoalim HaHakla'im) was a trade union in Israel, founded in 1918.

== Elections ==
Internal elections were held for the first time in 1968. A total of 45,000 union members were eligible to vote, of which 68% took part in the polling.

Party	%
Alignment	66.90%
Religious Front (Hapoel HaMizrachi-Poalei Agudat Yisrael)	19.61%
Gahal (Herut-Liberal Bloc)	7.22%
Independent Liberals	2.94%
New Communist List	2.39%
Israel Communist Party	0.94%
