= Börje Svensson =

Swedish trade union leader (born 1928)

Börje Svensson (born 1928) is a Swedish former trade union leader.

Born in Blekinge, Svensson began working as a cowhand, and also joined the Swedish Agricultural Workers' Union (SLF). He was soon elected as the education officer of his local branch, and also undertook his own studies, which enabled him to become a foreman at some stables. He went on to study labour movement relations, after which the SLF nominated him to the Industrial Relations Board.

In 1967, Svensson became the full-time Working Environment Officer at the SLF headquarters. In 1973, he was elected as president of the SLF, also serving on the executive bodies of the Agricultural Credit Bank and that of the Swedish University of Agricultural Sciences. In 1982, he was additionally elected as president of the International Federation of Plantation and Agricultural Workers (IFPAAW), then in 1988 he was elected as its full-time general secretary. Under his leadership, IFPAAW merged into the International Union of Food and Allied Workers.

Trade union offices
Preceded by Ewald Jansson	President of the Swedish Agricultural Workers' Union; 1973–1988	Succeeded by Mats Hansson
Preceded by Tom Bavin	President of the International Federation of Plantation and Agricultural Workers; 1982–1988	Succeeded by P. P. Narayanan
Preceded by José Vargas	General Secretary of the International Federation of Plantation and Agricultural Workers; 1988–1994	Succeeded by Federation merged
