= Federation of Food and Tobacco =

Trade union of Italy

The Federation of Food and Tobacco (Italian: Federazione dell'alimentazione e del tabacco, FAT) was a trade union representing workers in the food processing industry in Italy.

The union was founded in 1981, when the United Federation of Bakery and Food Processing Workers merged with the National Union of State Monopoly Workers, which represented people involved in tobacco processing. Like both its predecessors, the union affiliated to the Italian Confederation of Workers' Trade Unions.

By 1996, the union claimed 41,539 members. The following year, it merged with the Italian Federation of Agricultural Employees and Labourers, to form the Italian Federation of Agriculture, Food and the Environment.
