= Italian Federation of Tertiary Services Networks =

Italian trade union

The Italian Federation of Tertiary Services Networks (Italian: Federazione Italiana Reti dei Servizi del Terziario, FIRST) is a trade union representing workers in the finance sector in Italy.

The union was founded on 5 May 2015, when the Italian Federation of Bank and Insurance Employees, an affiliate of the Italian Confederation of Workers' Trade Unions (CISL), merged with DirCredito, an independent trade union representing managers and senior staff in the industry. The new union also affiliated to CISL.

The union was initially led by Giulio Romani, and then from 2019 by Riccardo Colombani.
