= Mehmet Yıldız (politician) =

German politician

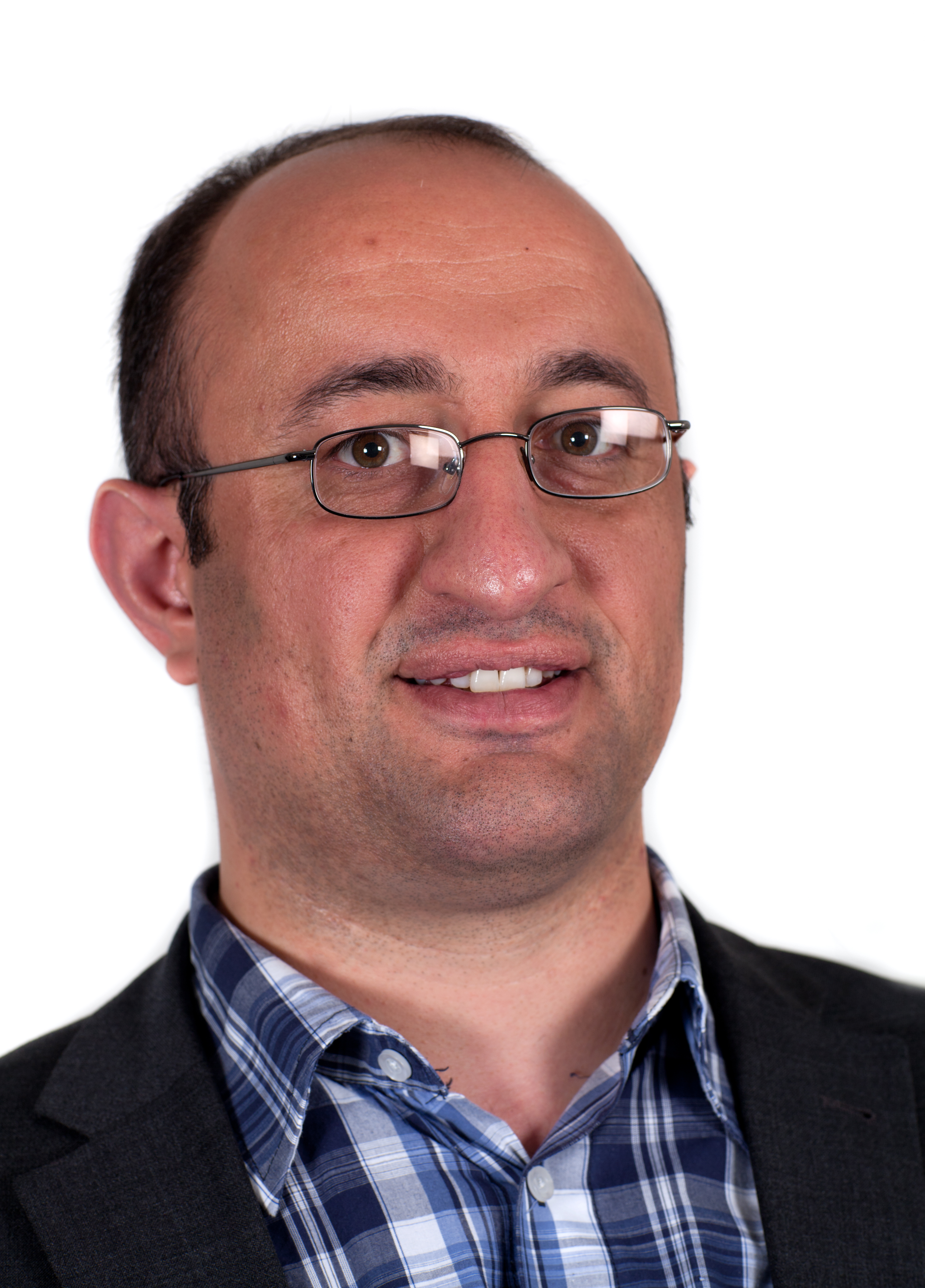
Mehmet Yildiz in June 2011.

Mehmet Yıldız (born 2 October 1977 in Kayseri, Turkey) is a German-Turkish-Kurdish politician. (Die Linke). He has been a member of the Hamburg Parliament since 2008.

== Biography ==
Yildiz was born in Turkey in 1977, where he attended primary school from 1984 to 1988 and secondary school until 1990. He moved to Germany at the age of twelve. He graduated from a comprehensive high school in 1993. Prior to that, he attended a multinational preparation course. From August 1993 to January 1997, he completed an electrician apprenticeship. He then worked as an order picker until March 2008. He is currently married and has two children.

== Politics ==
Yildiz, who is also a member of the IGBAU, is involved with the Democratic Workers' Association (Föderation Demokratischer Arbeitervereine / DIDF), where the majority of members have Turkish or Kurdish origins. During the Hamburg Bürgerschaftswahl (municipal elections), he ran as an Independent politician of the DIDF from Platz 6 in the candidate list of Die Linke. He then declared his entry into Die Linke in April 2009 In the 2011 Hamburg Bürgerschaftswahl won a direct mandate in Wahlkreis Billstedt-Wilhelmsburg-Finkenwerder. He was the professional speaker for migration, sports, children, youth and families. In the 20th legislature period, he represented his faction in the family, children and youth committee, as well as in the "Yagmur" inquiry committee. Furthermore, he was a deputy member in the Civil Liberties Committee and prior to that chairman of his faction in the Kriminalfall Chantal special committee. During the Hamburg 2015 Bürgerschaftswahl, he renewed his direct mandate in Wahlkreis 2.
