= Italian Federation of Chemical and Oil Workers =

Trade union of Italy

The Italian Federation of Chemical and Oil Workers (Italian: Federazione Italiana Lavoratori Chimici e Petroliferi, FILCEP) was a trade union representing workers in the chemical and mining industries in Italy.

The union was founded in 1960, when the Italian Federation of Chemical Workers merged with the Italian Union of Oil Workers and the Italian Federation of Mining Industry Workers. Like its predecessors, it affiliated to the Italian General Confederation of Labour. In December 1968, it merged with the Federation of Glass and Ceramics, to form the Italian Federation of Chemical and Allied Workers.

== General Secretaries ==
1960: Angelo Di Gioia
1968: Giovan Battista Trespidi
