= Piet Hiemstra =

Dutch politician (1878–1953)

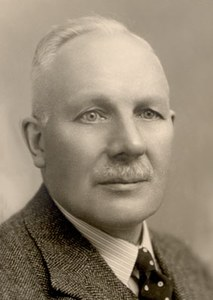
P. Hiemstra

Pieter Feddes Hiemstra (4 August 1878 – 9 January 1953) was a Dutch trade union leader and politician.

Born in Húns to a farming family, Hiemstra hoped to become a schoolteacher, but could not afford the training, and so worked as a cook, then as an apprentice painter, but at the age of 14, he switched to farm work. He worked for Ate de Gavere, a socialist, and this led Hiemstra to also become a socialist. He then spent some time working in Germany, and in the Dutch military, gradually moving into dairy work, and then becoming a cheese maker.

Hiemstra was an early member of the Union of Dairy Workers, and in 1904, he became its president, working nearly full-time for the union from 1905. In 1908, the union affiliated to the Dutch Confederation of Trade Unions (NVV), and the following year, Hiemstra took it into a merger with the New Dutch Agricultural Workers' Union, forming the Federation of Agricultural and Dairy Workers. He became the union's secretary, then from 1912 was its president and editor of its journal, Vereenigt U.

Hiemstra also joined the Social Democratic Workers' Party (SDAP), and later became the chair of its Leeuwarden executive. However, he argued that the trade union movement should maintain its distance from the SDAP. He was elected to the Leeuwarden municipal council in 1912, and the Frisian States in 1913.

Under Hiemstra's leadership, the union grew, and in 1920, it organised a conference which led to the formation of the International Landworkers' Federation (ILF). Hiemstra became its first general secretary, although in 1924 its headquarters were moved to Germany to save on translation costs, and he switched to become vice president. In 1933, the headquarters returned to the Netherlands, and he once again became general secretary.

The union's office moved to Utrecht in 1921, and Hiemstra also relocated. The same year, he was elected to the House of Representatives, where he argued for shorter working hours and better benefits for agricultural workers. In 1927, he was elected to the Utrecht provincial council.

Hiemstra retired from the House of Representatives and the ILF in 1937, the union in 1938, and the provincial council in 1939. He served as a member of the Senate from 1937 until 1946.

Trade union offices
Preceded by ?	President of the Federation of Agricultural and Dairy Workers; 1912–1938	Succeeded by Jan Hilgenga
Preceded by New position	General Secretary of the International Landworkers' Federation; 1920–1924	Succeeded by Georg Schmidt
Preceded by Georg Schmidt	General Secretary of the International Landworkers' Federation; 1933–1937	Succeeded by Oscar Lewinsen
