= Italian Federation of Commercial and Related Services and Tourism =

Trade union of Italy

The Italian Federation of Commercial and Related Services and Tourism (Italian: Federazione Italiana Sindacati Addetti Servizi Commerciali, Affini e del Turismo, FISASCAT) is a trade union representing service sector workers in Italy.

The union was founded on 12 October 1948 as the Italian Federation of Free Trade Unions of Commercial Workers, by workers who had left the Italian General Confederation of Labour-affiliated Italian Federation of Trade and Allied Workers. In 1950, it was a founding affiliate of the Italian Confederation of Workers' Trade Unions (CISL). It changed its name several times as its remit expanded to include hospitality and tourism workers, becoming FISASCAT in 1962.

By 1998, the union claimed 132,948 members, with 40% working in hospitality, and 60% in commerce. By 2017, this had increased to 366,899, making it the largest sectoral trade union affiliated to CISL.

== General Secretaries ==
1948: Pietro Paccagnella
1950: Amleto Mantegazza
1952: Ugo Zino
1955: Giulio Pettinelli
1971: Leonardo Romano
1985: Renato di Marco
1989: Mario Cesino
1994: Gianni Baratta
2006: Pierangelo Raineri
2018: Davide Guarini
