= Italian Transport Federation =

Trade union of Italy

The Italian Transport Federation (Italian: Federazione Italiana Trasporti, FIT) is a trade union representing workers in the transport sector in Italy.

The union was founded in September 1950. It affiliated to the Italian Confederation of Workers' Trade Unions and, internationally, to the International Transport Workers' Federation . Its membership grew from 21,449 in 1954, to 48,520 in 1983, and 93,555 in 1998.
