= Italian Confederation of Trades Unions =

Italian trade union association

CISL
- Italian Confederation of Trade Unions
- Confederazione Italiana Sindacati Lavoratori
- Founded: 1950
- Headquarters: Rome, Italy
- Location: Italy
- Members: 4,507,349 (2008)
- Key people: Daniela Fumarola, secretary general
- Affiliations: ITUC; ETUC; TUAC
- Website: cisl.it

The Italian Confederation of Trades Unions (Italian: Confederazione Italiana Sindacati Lavoratori, pronounced [koɱfederatˈtsjoːne itaˈljaːna sindaˈkaːti lavoraˈtoːri]; CISL [tʃizl]) is a national trade union centre in Italy representing various Catholic-inspired groups linked with Christian Democracy party.

It was founded on 30 April 1950, when Catholics in the Italian General Confederation of Labour (CGIL) left after they clashed with the Italian Communist Party on the issue of a general strike provoked by the latter. Like the French Force Ouvrière (FO) union, it received financial support from Irving Brown, leader of the international relations of the US AFL–CIO and a CIA contractee.

== Structure ==
The CISL is formed on two levels: a vertical one, grouping workers according to employment (such as transport, banks, and teaching), and the confederation itself, representing all categories. The base of the latter is formed by districts (or Unioni territoriali), grouped in regions. On the national level, CISL ensures cooperation of various branch organisms within the territorial hierarchy. The confederation holds regular Congresses that elect members to leadership positions.

== History ==
After a difficult start and numerous disagreements between various trade unions represented, CISL managed to gain a voice through its representatives in the Italian Parliament, asking for increased and autonomous presence of the companies partly owned by the state. In 1956, owing to CISL initiatives, the latter had separated from the employers' group Confindustria and had formed the Intersind – meant to establish a new base for relation between the state and trade unions. In the late 1950s and early 1960s, the confederation coordinated strike actions of the metalworkers and workers in electromechanics, as well as the labour dispute in Milan. Its great success came in 1963, when it negotiated with electromechanics employers new bonuses, means of promotion, and awards in accordance with increased productivity. Nonetheless, trade union activities on factory grounds remained exceptionally difficult, and workers attempting them risked being sacked.

When the Italian economy sunk in the mid-1960s, CISL suffered an internal crisis as numerous of its branches believed the political function of the union to be incompatible with its labour goals. The 6th Congress it held in 1969 sanctioned the view, and renounced its activities in Parliament.

The following years proved to be especially tumultuous for Italy as a whole: while traditional trade unionism was being reshaped by the student movement and secondary impact of the decolonization and Third World ideologies, the local scene saw the advent of terrorism of the Red Brigades and the Neo-Fascist Strategy of tension (carried out by the National Vanguard). CISL doubled its specific activism with an advocacy of democracy, siding with the civil society. In July 1972, it co-founded the Federazione unitaria, meant as a transitional group, which became a rather bureaucratical institution. CISL signed an agreement with other national federations in 1975, calling for a readjustment of the salary-pension balance, as well as for a new minimum wage. Federazione unitaria also proposed a new tactic at its Congress in 1978, calling for a larger perspective of the unions – one mindful of the national economical policy. In 1983 CISL founded ISCOS, Trade Union Institute for Development Cooperation.

The gradual decrease of inflation in the 1980s and 1990s (again at under 10 per cent in 1984). The state intervention in the economy in order to decrease labour costs was sanctioned by the population in the 1985 Italian referendum, after being backed by accords in which the CISL played a major part (the policy was opposed by the confederation's left-wing, as well as by the CGIL and the Italian Communist Party). The CISL was part in two protocols with the Italian executive, in 1992 and 1993, both of which agreed to allow tight control of the inflation rate and government debt. From 1994 onwards, it convened to the creation of the Rappresentanze sindacali unitarie (Unitary Representatives of Trade Unions), a trans-federative organism meant to ensure a preliminary democratic agreement on all labour matters, and also intended as a step towards a new single trade union.

== General Secretaries ==
Years	Name	Party
1950–1958	Giulio Pastore	DC
1958–1977	Bruno Storti	DC
1977–1979	Luigi Macario	DC
1979–1985	Pierre Carniti	PSI
1985–1991	Franco Marini	DC
1991–2000	Sergio D'Antoni	DC/PPI
2000–2006	Savino Pezzotta	UDC
2006–2014	Raffaele Bonanni	Ind.
2014–2021	Annamaria Furlan	Ind.
2021–2025	Luigi Sbarra	Ind.
2025–	Daniela Fumarola	Ind.

== Affiliates ==
=== Current affiliates ===
Union	Abbreviation	Founded	Membership (2010)
Federation of Energy, Fashion, Chemistry and Related Workers	FEMCA	2001	128,292
Federation of Entertainment, Information and Telecommunications	FISTEL	1997	50,803
Federation of Innovation and Research	FIR		3,940
Federation of Italian Electricity Company Workers	FLAEI	1949	17,518
Federation of Self-Employed and Atypical Workers	FELSA	2009	47,653
General Union of Growers	UGC	1983	73,337
Italian Federation of Agriculture, Food and the Environment	FAI	1997	199,020
Italian Federation of Commercial and Related Services and Tourism	FISASCAT	1948	233,887
Italian Federation of Construction and Allied Workers	FILCA	1955	298,953
Italian Federation of Metal Mechanics	FIM	1950	212,377
Italian Federation of Tertiary Services Networks	FIRST	2015	N/A
Italian Transport Federation	FIT	1950	118,015
Medici	CISL Medici	2005	8,129
National Federation of Pensioners	FNP	1948	2,201,864
National Safety Federation	FNS	2009	15,060
Public Function	FP	1999	326,180
Scuola	CISL Scuola	1997	229,027
Union of Postal Workers	SLP	1993	68,075
Università	CISL Università		10,385

=== Former affiliates ===
Union	Abbreviation	Founded	Left	Reason not affiliated	Membership (1954)
Autonomous Union of Italian Railway Workers	SAUFI			Merged into FILTAT	10,292
Federation of Chemistry	Federchimi	1950	1981	Merged into FLERICA	44,239
Federation of Energy	Federenergia		1981	Merged into FLERICA	N/A
Federation of Energy, Resource, Chemical and Related Workers	FLERICA	1981	2001	Merged into FEMCA	N/A
Federation of Entertainment and Information	FIS	1985	1997	Merged into FISTEL	N/A
Federation of Food and Tobacco	FAT	1981	1997	Merged into FAI	N/A
Federation of Postal and Telecommunication Unions	FPT	1984	1997	Merged into FISTEL	N/A
Federation of Public Functionaries	FFP	1984	1997	Merged into FPI	N/A
Federation of Public Employees	FPI	1997	1999	Merged into FP	N/A
Federation of Seamen, Air and Fishing Workers	FILM				38,007
Free Italian Federation of Mining Industry Workers	Federstrattive				10,573
Italian Federation of Agricultural Employees and Labourers	FISBA	1950	1997	Merged into FAI	361,500
Italian Federation of the Arts and Professions	FAPI				4,058
Italian Federation of Bank Employees	FIB	1950	1981	Merged into FIBA	14,658
Italian Federation of Bank and Insurance Employees	FIBA	1981	2015	Merged into FIRST	N/A
Italian Federation of Book Workers	Federlibro	1950	1985	Merged into FIS	13,995
Italian Federation of Health Workers' Unions	FISOS	1950	1997	Merged into FIST	20,688
Italian Federation of Insurance Company Workers	FILA		1981	Merged into FIBA	N/A
Italian Federation of Local Government Employees	FIDEL	1951	1984	Merged into FFP	66,137
Italian Federation of Local Government Workers	FILSEL	1993	1997	Merged into FIST	N/A
Italian Federation of Public Services	Federpub	1950	1984	Merged into FFP	10,234
Italian Federation of State Workers	FILSTAT	1950	1984	Merged into FIT	63,117
Italian Federation of State Workers	FILS	1993	1997	Merged into FPI	N/A
Italian Federation of Tax Service Workers					3,900
Italian Federation of Territorial Services	FIST	1997	1999	Merged into FP	N/A
Italian Federation of Textile Workers	FILT	1950	1965	Merged into FILTA	150,456
Italian Federation of Textile and Clothing Workers	FILTA	1965	2001	Merged into FEMCA	N/A
Italian Middle School Union	SISM	1964	1997	Merged into Scuola	N/A
Italian Union of Local Post and Telegraph Agency Workers	SILULAP	1950	1984	Merged into FPT	16,153
Italian Union of State Telephone Workers	SILTS				2,169
National Federation of Auto, Rail and Inland Waterway Workers	Fenlai				24,068
National Federation of Farm Tenants and Owners					85,163
National Federation of Port Workers	Fenalporti				3,920
National Federation of Quasi-Governmental and Government Agency Workers	Federpubblici				13,514
National Federation of Sharecroppers and Smallholders	Federcoltivatori	1950	1983	Merged into UGC	102,688
National Union of Elementary Schools	Sinascel	1945	1997	Merged into Scuola	119,206
Union of State Monopoly Workers			1981	Merged into FAT	N/A
United Federation of Entertainment Workers	FULS		1985	Merged into FIS	7,457
United Federation of Food Processing and Sugar Industry Workers	FULPIA	1950	1981	Merged into FAT	42,735
United Italian Federation of Clothing Workers	FUILA		1965	Merged into FILTA	55,186

== See also ==
- Italian Labour Union
