= Georg Schmidt (trade unionist) =

German trade unionist and politician

Georg Schmidt (22 November 1875 – 22 February 1946) was a German trade unionist and politician.

Born in Biebrich (now part of Wiesbaden) in Hesse-Nassau, Schmidt became a gardener, and in 1898 he joined the General German Gardeners' Union. Shortly after, he moved to Mannheim, where he joined the local Verein Edelweiß association, which he persuaded to join the union. In 1902, he was elected to the union's national executive, and in 1903, he successfully persuaded the union to affiliate to the General Commission of German Trade Unions.

From 1904, Schmidt worked as one of three full-time employees of the union, with responsibility for southern Germany. In 1905, he became managing director of the union's newspaper, the Allgemeine Deutsche Gärtner-Zeitung. In 1907, Schmidt became the president of the union, and within two years, he had increased its membership to 5,000. This brought him to the attention of Carl Legien, leader of the General of Commission of German Trade Unions. The federation were establishing the Union of Agricultural, Forest and Vineyard Workers of Germany, and Legien persuaded Schmidt to become its full-time president.

Under Schmidt's leadership, the union grew rapidly, becoming the German Agricultural Workers' Union, and negotiated pay and conditions with employers. In 1919, the General Commission was replaced by the General German Trade Union Confederation, and Schmidt served on its executive. From 1924, he also served as general secretary of the International Landworkers' Federation.

Schmidt was also a member of the Social Democratic Party of Germany (SPD), and he was elected to the Prussian State Assembly in 1919, and then the Reichstag in 1920, representing Pomerania. He also served on the Provisional Reich Economic Council in 1920, and from 1924 until 1933.

In both his political and trade union roles, Schmidt argued against tariffs. He tried to persuade the ADGB to support a reduction in pay for civil servants. He also negotiated a major agreement with Polish trade unionists on the role of migrant agricultural workers from Poland. He remained in his trade union posts until the Nazi government banned unions in 1933, and maintained his trade union and social democratic contacts over the following years. At the end of World War II, the SPD was re-established, and Schmidt served on its Berlin agricultural policy committee.

Trade union offices
Preceded by Jakobloch	President of the Union of Gardeners and Nursery Workers; 1907–1909	Succeeded by Josef Busch
Preceded by New position	President of the German Agricultural Workers' Union; 1909–1933	Succeeded by Union banned
Preceded by Piet Hiemstra	General Secretary of the International Landworkers' Federation; 1924–1933	Succeeded by Piet Hiemstra
