= Adolf Hofer (politician) =

Prussian Junker and politician

Adolf Hofer (17 August 1868 in Pleinlauken, Province of Prussia – 3 September 1935 in Berlin) was a Prussian Junker and a Social democratic politician.

== Life ==
Hofer's father was a large landowner in Skaisgirren (Bolshakovo), East Prussia. In 1889, Hofer joined the Social Democratic Party of Germany (SPD), a rather unusual choice for landed nobility of Prussia. From 1893, he took over the management of the manor until 1913 when he sold it to live as a private citizen on the estate of his wife in Pleinlauken.

Since 1898, Hofer was a candidate for the Reichstag, but succeeded only in getting elected to the Landtag of Prussia. He was expelled from the SPD faction in 1917 due to his proximity to the rival Independent Social Democratic Party of Germany (USPD), in which he became a leading member. Along with Otto Braun (SPD), Hofer (for USPD) was, until 4 January 1919, the director of the Agricultural Ministry in the Prussian Rat der Volksbeauftragten during the German revolution of 1918–1919.

In 1922, Hofer returned to the SPD. From 1923 onwards, he was the Landrat (district administrator) of Kreis Fischhausen in Easy Prussia and, from 1926, a deputy in the Provinziallandtag (provincial parliament) of East Prussia. He retired in 1931.

== Work ==
- Sozialismus und Landwirtschaft. Berlin, 1921
