= Plantation Workers International Federation =

Former international trade union federation

The Plantation Workers International Federation (PWIF) was an international trade secretariat of the International Confederation of Free Trade Unions. PWIF was founded at the firth ICFTU world congress held in Tunis in July 1957. Samuel Powell Claret was appointed as the general secretary of PWIF and Tom Bavin as its Director of Organisation. PWIF was launched by ICFTU to organize plantation unions in the Third World.

PWIF had its headquarters in Brussels. The membership fee of PWIF was ten pound Sterling per 1,000 members. Moreover, the build-up of PWIF was supported by the International Solidarity Fund of ICFTU (in fact PWIF was one of the main recipients of this support during its short existence).

The Interim Executive Committee of PWIF held its first meeting in Tunis on July 11, 1957. Until the foundation of PWIF Powell Claret had been in charge of Havana Office of the Special Plantations Committee of ICFTU. Bavin on the other hand was a known ICFTU organiser of plantation unions in Asia. With the launching of PWIF, the scope of Bavin's activity was expanded to Africa and Latin America. M.D. Barrett was seconded by the Commonwealth Section of the TUC International Department to support PWIF.

PWIF contracted W. Morgan of the London School of Economics to carry out a survey of the global tea industry. Barrett's secondment was extended and in December 1958 he was sent to Tanganyika as the PWIF representative there. In Tanganyika Barrett managed to organise a union, the Tanganyika Sisal and Plantation Workers Union (TSPWU). PWIF donated a Land Rover to TSPWU, in order to enable organising in remote areas.

In 1958 the International Federation of Tobacco Workers merged into PWIF. As of December 1958 PWIF claimed have 13 national affiliated, with a combined membership of 1,003,836. PWIF had offices and/or field representatives/organisers in India (an Asia Office based in New Delhi), Indonesia, Tanganyika, Kenya, Mauritius, the British Cameroons (covering French Cameroons as well), New York City and Trinidad.

PWIF engaged in discussions with the Europe-based International Landworkers' Federation and at the sixth ICFTU world congress in Brussels in December 1959 a merger conference of PWIF and ILF was held, resulting in the foundation of the International Federation of Plantation and Agricultural Workers (IFPAW). The merger congress of ILF-PWIF took place in Maison des Huit Heures at Place Fontainas. Bavin became the general secretary of the new federation.
