= Italian Federation of Metal Mechanics =

Italian trade union

The Italian Federation of Metal Mechanics (Italian: Federazione Italiana Metalmeccanici, FIM) is a trade union representing metal and engineering workers in Italy.

The Italian Federation of Metalworkers was re-established in 1944, and affiliated to the Italian General Confederation of Labour. However, two Christian democratic groups left, founding the Italian Federation of Free Metal Mechanic Workers, and the Italian Union of Metal Mechanic Workers. On 30 March 1950, the two merged, forming the "Italian Federation of Metal Mechanics". The following month, the union was a founding affiliate of the Italian Confederation of Workers' Trade Unions (CISL).

By 1954, the union claimed 137,680 members, and by 1998 this had grown to 183,446.

== General Secretaries ==
1950: Franco Volontè
1963: Luigi Macario
1970: Pierre Carniti
1974: Franco Bentivogli
1983: Raffaele Morese
1989: Gianni Italia
1997: Pier Paolo Baretta
1999: Giorgio Caprioli
2009: Giuseppe Farina
2014: Marco Bentivogli
2020: Roberto Benaglia
