= Italian Federation of Textile and Clothing Workers =

Trade union of Italy

The Italian Federation of Textile and Clothing Workers (Italian: Federazione Italiana dei Lavoratori Tessili e dell'abbigliamento, FILTA) was a trade union representing garment and textile workers in Italy.

The union was founded in 1965, when the Italian Federation of Textile Workers merged with the United Italian Federation of Garment Workers. Like both its predecessors, it affiliated to the Italian Confederation of Workers' Trade Unions. By 1998, it had 77,334 members.

In 2001, the union merged with the Federation of Energy, Resource, Chemical and Related Workers, to form the Federation of Energy, Fashion, Chemistry and Related Workers.
