= Tom Bavin (trade unionist) =

British trade union leader

Tom S. Bavin (1909 – 11 August 1984) was a British trade union leader.

Born in Lincolnshire, Bavin worked in agriculture. When he was 17 he joined the National Union of Agricultural Workers, and was elected to its executive committee when he was only 24. In 1952, he was seconded to the International Union of Food and Drink Workers, becoming its plantation representative, and helped build the new National Union of Plantation Workers in Malaysia.

In 1957, Bavin was appointed as director of organisation for the new Plantation Workers International Federation, then in 1959 became general secretary of its successor, the International Federation of Plantation and Agricultural Workers. In 1976, he retired, but was elected as president of the federation, travelling widely in support of the union for the next six years.

Trade union offices
Preceded by New position	General Secretary of the International Federation of Plantation and Agricultural Workers; 1959–1976	Succeeded by Stanley Correa
Preceded by Harold Collison	President of the International Federation of Plantation and Agricultural Workers; 1976–1982	Succeeded by Börje Svensson
