= Italian Federation of Agricultural Employees and Labourers =

Trade union of Italy

The Italian Federation of Agricultural Employees and Labourers (Italian: Federazione Italiana Salariati Braccianti Agricoli e Maestranze Specializzate, FISBA) was a trade union representing workers in the agricultural sector in Italy.

The union was founded on 1 May 1950, with most of its members being Christian democrats who had left the National Federation of Agricultural Workers. It affiliated to the new Italian Confederation of Workers' Trade Unions (CISL), and also to the International Landworkers' Federation. It was initially led by Angelo Formis, then by Amos Zanibelli, Paulo Sartori and, finally, Albino Gorini.

The union was CISL's largest affiliate, claiming 361,500 members in 1955, and 214,430 members in 1996. The following year, it merged with the Federation of Food and Tobacco, to form the Italian Federation of Agriculture, Food and the Environment.
