= Italian Federation of Bank and Insurance Employees =

Trade union of Italy

The Italian Federation of Bank and Insurance Employees (Italian: Federazione Italiana Bancari e Assicurativi, FIBA) was a trade union representing workers in the finance sector in Italy.

The union was founded in 1981, when the Italian Federation of Bank Employees merged with the Italian Federation of Insurance Company Workers. Like both its predecessors, it affiliated to the Italian Confederation of Workers' Trade Unions (CISL). By 1998, the union claimed 78,877 members.

In 2015, the union merged with DirCredito, to form the Italian Federation of Tertiary Services Networks.
