= CISL Public Function =

Trade union of Italy

CISL Public Function (Italian: CISL Funzione Pubblica, FP) is a trade union representing public sector workers in Italy.

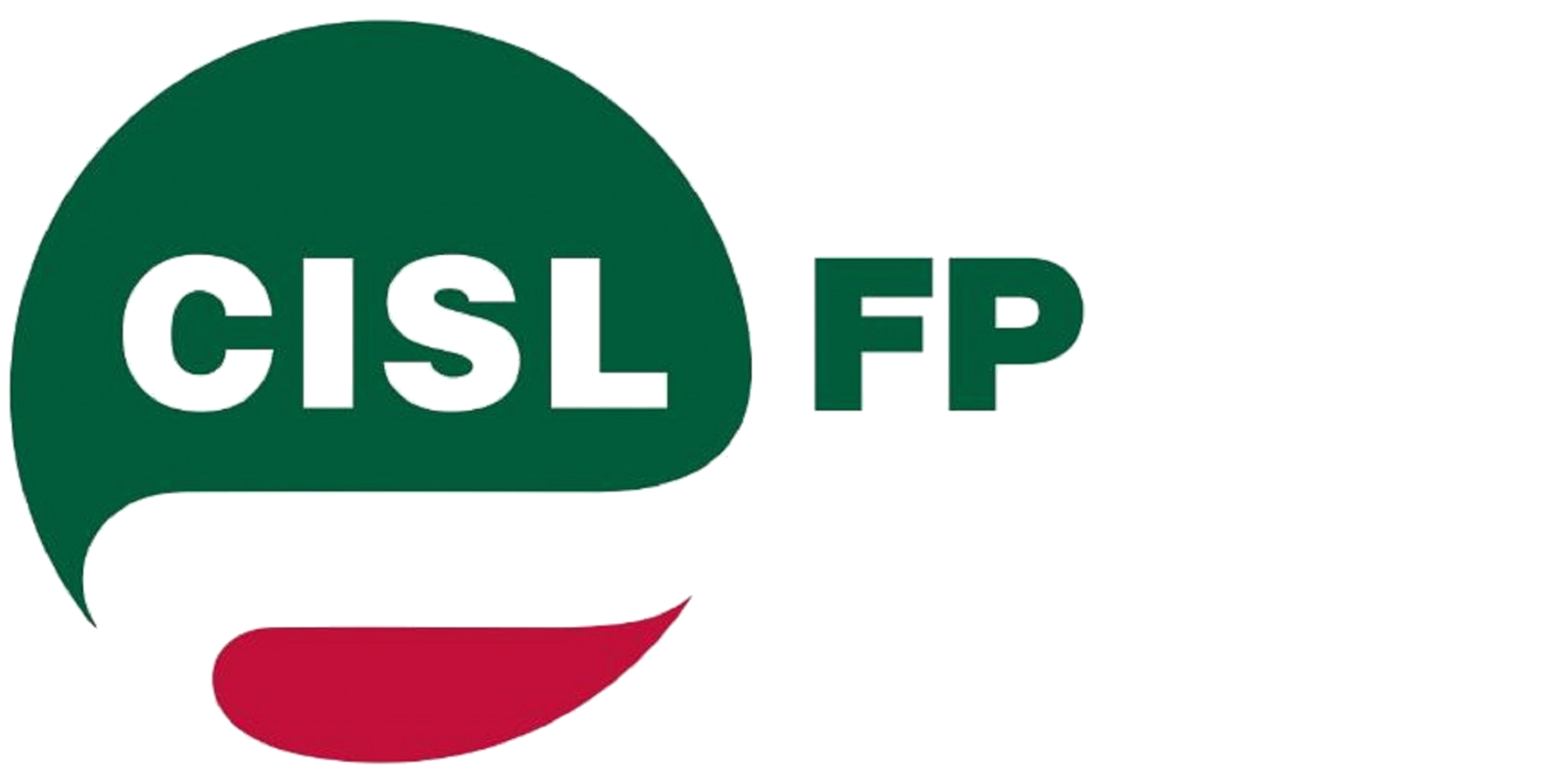
CISL Public Function Logo

The union was established in 1999, when the Italian Federation of Territorial Services, representing healthcare workers, merged with the Federation of Public Employees. Like both its predecessors, it affiliated to the Italian Confederation of Trade Unions (CISL). By 2017, it had 244,705 members, making it the second-largest sectoral trade union affiliated to the CISL. Since 2017, the union has been led by Maurizio Petriccioli.
