= Italian Federation of Construction and Allied Workers =

Trade union of Italy

The Italian Federation of Construction and Allied Workers (Italian: Federazione Italiana Lavoratori Costruzioni e Affini, FILCA) is a trade union representing workers in the construction industry in Italy.

The union was founded on 15 March 1955 in Rome, when the Italian Construction Workers' Federation merged with the United Federation of Wood, Artistic and Allied Workers and the National Federation of Abrasives, Glass and Ceramic Workers. Like all its predecessors, the union affiliated to the Italian Confederation of Workers' Trade Unions.

Membership of the union grew from 107,407 in 1955, to 187,911 in 1998. At that time, 70% of the union's members worked in construction, 20% in wood manufacturing, and the remainder mostly in ceramics and glass. By 2016, membership had grown further, to 258,901.

== General Secretaries ==
1955: Stelvio Ravizza
1976: Nino Pagani
1979: Giancarlo Pelachini
1981: Carlo Mitra
1987: Natale Forlani
1991: Raffaele Bonanni
1999: Cesare Regenzi
2003: Domenico Pesenti
2016: Franco Turri
