= National Union of Elementary Schools =

Trade union of Italy

The National Union of Elementary Schools (Italian: Sindacato Nazionale Scuola Elementare, Sinascel) was a trade union representing primary and nursery school staff in Italy.

The union was founded in 1945, when the Italian School Federation was divided, and it held its first congress in Rome in 1946. It initially affiliated to the Italian General Confederation of Labour (CGIL), but in 1947 and 1948 its communist leadership was replaced by a new, Christian democratic leadership. As a result, in 1951, the union transferred to the new Italian Confederation of Workers' Trade Unions (CISL).

In 1954, the union claimed 119,206 members, and by 1983, it had 110,550. In 1981, it became part of the loose Italian Federation of Schools, Universities and Research, but this was dissolved in 1997, when Sinascel merged with the National Middle School Union, to form CISL Scuola.
