= Luigi Sbarra =

Italian politician (born 1960)

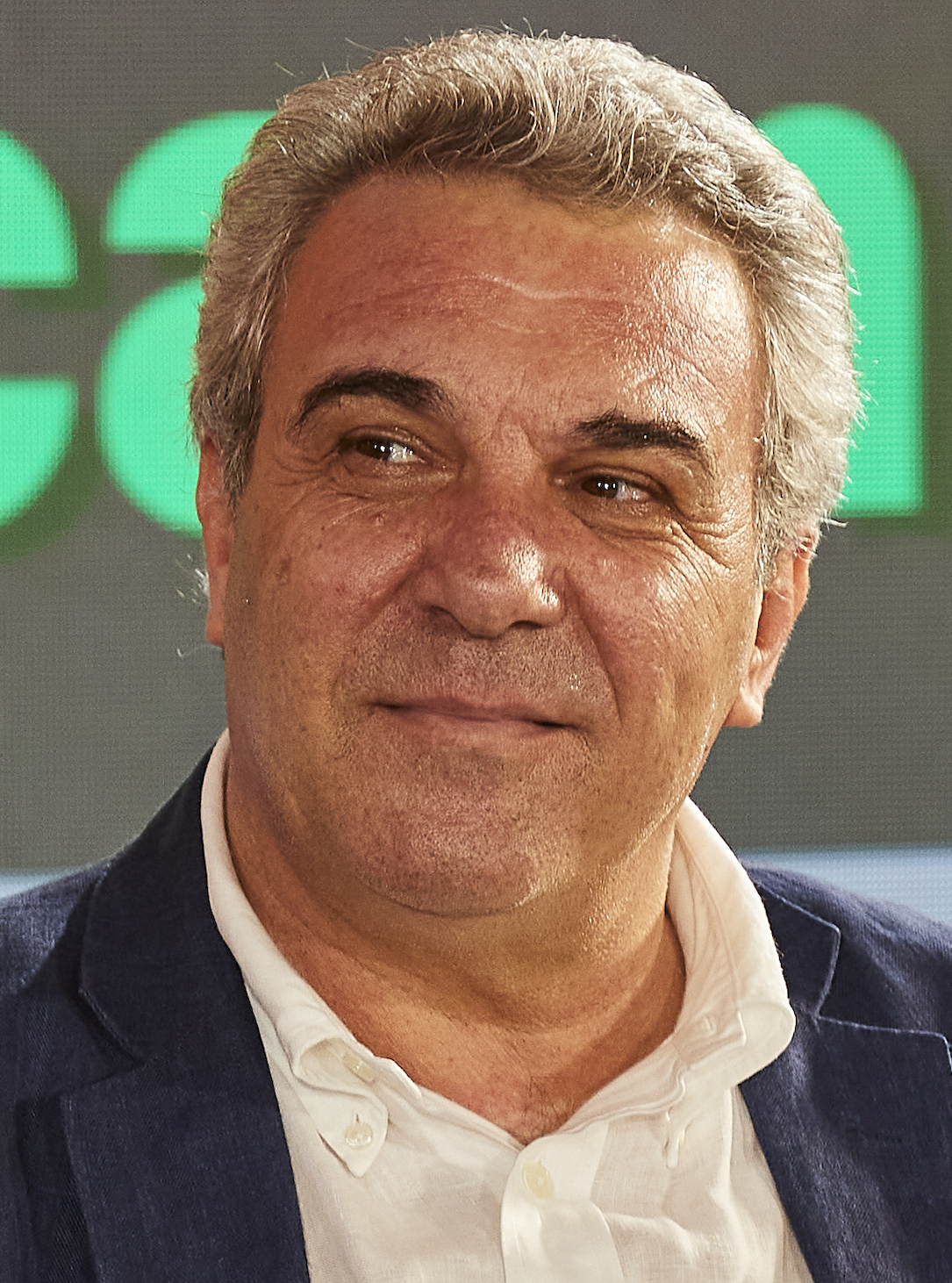
- Sbarra in 2021

General Secretary of CISL
- In office 3 March 2021 – 12 February 2025
- Preceded by: Annamaria Furlan
- Succeeded by: Daniela Fumarola

Personal details
- Born: 20 February 1960 (age 66) Pazzano, Italy
- Party: Independent (close to FdI)

Luigi Sbarra (born 20 February 1960) is an Italian trade unionist and politician. Since 2025, he has served as undersecretary to the Presidency of the Council of Ministers for Southern Italy. From 2021 to 2025, he served as secretary general of the Italian Confederation of Trades Unions. From 2016 to 2018, he served as secretary general of the Italian Federation of Agriculture, Food and the Environment.
