= Union of Postal Workers =

Trade union of Italy

- Sindacato dei Lavoratori Poste
- Formation: 1993; 33 years ago
- Type: Trade Union
- Location: Italy

The Union of Postal Workers (Italian: Sindacato dei Lavoratori Poste, SLP) is a trade union representing the staff of Poste italiane.

The union was founded in 1993, when the Italian Union of Post and Telegraph Workers (SILP) merged with the Italian Union of Local Post and Telegraph Agency Workers (SILULAP), and the Italian Union of Workers in Postal Procurement Businesses (SILIAPT). All three organisation participated in the Federation of Postal and Telecommunications Unions, an affiliate of the Italian Confederation of Workers' Trade Unions (CISL). The union's first general secretary was Salvatore Villa.

In 1997, the union was reorganised as the Federation of Postal Workers, directly affiliated to CISL, and by 1998, it claimed 73,394 members. By 2010, this had decreased to 68,075 members. Internationally, it is an affiliate of Union Network International.
