= ISCOS =

ISCOS (Trade Unions Institute for Development Co-operation)
- Founded: 1983; 43 years ago
- Type: Non-profit
- Location: Rome, Italy
- Fields: Human and Worker Rights and Socio-Economic Development
- Key people: Mario Arca (President)
- Website: www.iscos-cisl.org

The Istituto Sindacale per la Cooperazione allo Sviluppo (ISCOS; The Trade Unions Institute for Development Co-operation) is an Italian NGO (Non-Governmental Organisation) promoted in 1983 by CISL. The Institute is engaged in the international co-operation programs that implement projects in the fields of human and worker rights and socio-economic development.

One of its main objectives is to promote solidarity among Italian workers and the workers from Developing Countries, in order to achieve peace, democracy and the respect of human rights. The projects are implemented in some of the poorest countries in the world by ISCOS in partnership with the local trade unions organisations, in order to avoid the negative impact of external models on the local society.

Today ISCOS is engaged on two closely linked sides: the activities directly related to international co-operation projects, and the campaign for increasing awareness, in Italy, on the importance of international solidarity. This latter aspect is becoming more important every day since the number of immigrants coming to Italy from developing countries is increasing.

ISCOS is deeply rooted in the Italian local communities, thanks to its structures: which are a National Headquarters and Regional Committees.
