= Federation of Entertainment, Information and Telecommunications =

Trade union of Italy

The Federation of Entertainment, Information and Telecommunications (Italian: Federazione Informazione Spettacolo e Telecomunicazioni, FISTEL) is a trade union representing workers in various related industries in Italy.

The union was founded in 1997, when the Federation of Entertainment and Information merged with the Union of Telecommunications. Like both its predecessors, the union is affiliated to the Italian Confederation of Workers' Trade Unions. By 1998, the union had 51,605 members, out of which 50% worked in printing, 30% in communications, and 20% in culture and entertainment.
