= Raffaele Bonanni =

Italian former trade union organizer

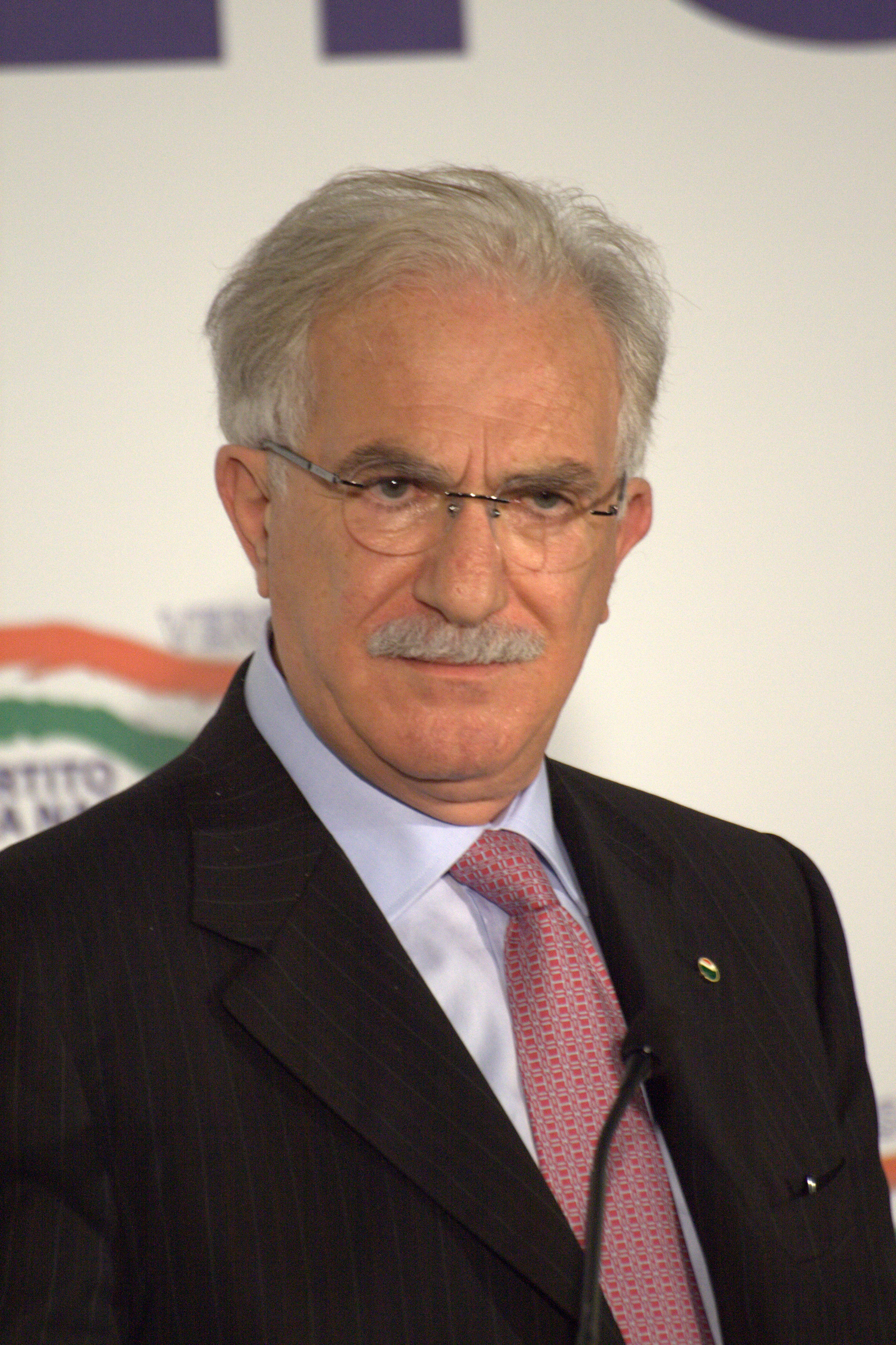
- Born: 10 June 1949 (age 75); Bomba, Chieti, Italy
- Occupation: trade union organizer

Raffaele Bonanni (born 10 June 1949) is an Italian former trade union organizer.

Born in Bomba, Chieti, Bonanni began his activity as a trade union operator in 1972, after attending a course at the "Centro Studi CISL" in Florence. In 1981 he became general secretary of the Italian Confederation of Workers' Trade Unions (CISL) of Palermo and then in 1989 he was elected general secretary of the Sicilian CISL. In 1991 he was elected secretary of Filca, a sub-association of the CISL, which involves about 250,000 subscribers. He was vice president of the European Federation of Building and Woodworkers (EFBWW). In 1998 he entered the secretariat of CISL, being elected general secretary on April 27, 2006. He resigned on September 24, 2014.
