= Italian Federation of Book Workers =

Trade union of Italy

The Italian Federation of Book Workers (Italian: Federazione Italiana Lavoratori del Libro, Federlibro) was a trade union representing printing workers in Italy.

The union was founded in 1950, with the merger of two small unions of Christian democratic workers, most of whom had recently left the Italian Federation of Paper and Printing Workers. The new union affiliated to the Italian Confederation of Workers' Trade Unions, and to the International Graphical Federation.

By 1954, the union claimed 13,995 members, and this grew steadily, reaching 20,548 members in 1965, and 28,000 in 1979. In 1985, it merged with the United Federation of Entertainment Workers, to form the Federation of Entertainment and Information.
