= CISL Scuola =

Trade union of Italy

CISL Scuola is a trade union representing school teachers in Italy.

The union was founded in 1997, when the National Union of Elementary Schools merged with the National Middle School Union. Both unions had been part of the loose Italian Federation of Schools, Universities and Research, which dissolved. Like both its predecessors, the union affiliated to the Italian Confederation of Workers' Trade Unions.

In 1998, the union claimed 168,736 members, and by 2006, this had grown to 211,246, making it the largest teachers' union in the country.

== General Secretaries ==
1997: Daniela Colturani
2004: Francesco Scrima
2015: Maddalena Gissi
