= IG Bauen-Agrar-Umwelt =

IGBAU
- IG Bauen-Agrar-Umwelt
- Founded: 1996
- Headquarters: Frankfurt, Germany
- Location: Germany
- Members: 350,000
- Key people: Robert Feiger, president
- Affiliations: DGB
- Website: www.igbau.de

The IG Bauen-Agrar-Umwelt (IG BAU) is a trade union in Germany with a membership of 350,000 (as per end of 2007). It is the fourth largest of eight industrial affiliates of the DGB (German Confederation of Trade Unions). IG BAU is active in the sectors of construction and engineering, building materials, building cleaning, facility management, gardening, forestry and agriculture. Since 2013 Robert Feiger has been the president of IG BAU.

IG BAU was formed in 1996 as a merger of the Building and Construction Union (IG BSE) and the Horticulture, Agriculture and Forestry Union (GGLF).

On the international level IG BAU is affiliated to the global union federations BWI, IUF and UNI.

The national headquarters of IG BAU is in Frankfurt am Main in Germany. IG BAU has also two political lobbying offices in the federal capital city of Berlin and the European capital city of Brussels/Belgium, 13 regional offices in most German federal state capitals and more than 120 local offices in all major cities of Germany.

== Collective Bargaining Policies ==
Most of the collective agreement policy of IG BAU is centralized. Many of the national collective agreements have been declared generally binding by the German federal government and so apply to all employers and workers in certain sectors like e.g. construction and the building cleaning trades. Because there was no general legal minimum wage in Germany until recently the IG BAU lobbied from 1990 onwards for the introduction of sectoral legal minimum wages based on the lowest categories of sector-wide collective agreements and succeeded in 1996. Since that time IG BAU - together with sectoral national employer organisations - has created legal sectoral minimum wages for general construction , demolition, painting, scaffolding, roofing and building cleaning including hotel cleaning and janitors by collective agreements, which have been declared generally binding by a federal order of the federal labor ministry. These minimum wages also apply to foreign companies who send their workers temporarily to Germany.

In 2013, IG BAU secured a wage hike of 3.2 percent for 12 months. In 2016, it negotiated a wage rise with employers for about 785,000 German construction workers. Under the agreement, employees in western German states got a rise of 4.6 percent and in eastern states 5.3 percent over a period of 22 months; the union had originally demanded a wage increase of 5.9 percent for its workers. Similar negotiations in 2018 resulted in pay hike of roughly 6 percent for more than 800,000 construction workers over 26 months.

== General Policies and Strategic Alliances ==
On the national level IG BAU is lobbying against the planned social insurance pension age of 67 (instead of 65). IG BAU is also very active on the European level and is pushing for a general reform of the general treaties of the European Union with the aim to guarantee workers rights on the European level. IG BAU was one of the most active unions fighting against the so-called Bolkestein directive. IG BAU has been also actively fighting the GATS agreement of the WTO, especially the cross-border provision of services under "mode 4" of the GATS (in which workers are sent to a different country by companies with the working conditions of their country-of-origin still applying).

There are individual links of union officials to several political parties like the social-democratic party, Christian-democratic party, green party and leftist party of Germany but in general IG BAU tries to develop an independent policy and to influence all democratic parties in Germany.

IG BAU was one of the first unions which reached out to the ecologist movement in Germany and to form strategical alliances with other NGOs. IG BAU joined the Forest Stewardship Council FSC at an early stage and was in the leadership to form a German branch of the FSC together with the national chapters of Greenpeace, Friends of the Earth (BUND) and WWF in Germany. IG BAU also helped to create other eco-social consumer labels like the "flower-label", "banafair" and "xertifix". Together with Greenpeace Germany IG BAU lobbied successful for environmental-friendly housing and energy-saving buildings.

== Organization ==
Because the construction sector in Germany consists of 70,000 companies (most of them with less than 10 workers and with a high fluctuation in the composition of the staff) and the situation in the building cleaning trades is much similar IG BAU has to employ many full-time organizers who organize the workers at their place of work. The individual IG BAU members are organized in locals at their living place and in sectoral local branches (not by company). IG BAU also tries to organize migrant workers and bogus self-employed workers.

Today, IG BAU mainly represents employees at construction companies such as Bilfinger SE and Hochtief.
