= Danish Gardeners' Union =

The Danish Gardeners' Union (Danish: Dansk Gartenerforbund) was a trade union representing gardeners in Denmark.

The union was founded in 1894, to represent market gardeners and nursery workers, later also covering landscape gardeners. While, in most other countries, gardeners were covered by agricultural workers' unions, in Denmark the agricultural workers joined the Danish General Workers' Union (SiD) in the 1930s. Nonetheless, the union affiliated to the International Landworkers' Federation. It also joined the Danish Confederation of Trade Unions.

From 1949 to 1959, Jens Risgaard Knudsen was the union's secretary. Membership reached 6,000 by 1971, but the following year, it merged into SiD.
