= Italian Federation of Agriculture, Food and the Environment =

Trade union of Italy

The Italian Federation of Agriculture, Food and the Environment (Italian: Federazione Agricola Alimentare Ambientale Industriale Italiana, FAI) is a trade union representing workers in various related industries in Italy.

The union was founded on 8 May 1997 at a conference in Lignano, when the Federation of Food and Tobacco merged with the Italian Federation of Agricultural Employees and Labourers. Like its predecessors, it affiliated to the Italian Confederation of Workers' Trade Unions. By 1998, it had 224,009 members.

== General Secretaries ==
1997: Albino Gorini
2000s:
2016: Luigi Sbarra
2018: Onofrio Rota
