= Religious Front =

The Religious Front was a political alliance in Israel, formed by the Orthodox parties Hapoel HaMizrachi and Poalei Agudat Yisrael to contest elections in trade unions. In 1968, the Religious Front contested four union elections: the Agricultural Labour Union (19.61%, finished second), the Clerks Union (16.03%, second place), the IDF Civilian Employees Union (9%, third place) and the Food Industry Workers Union (13.09%, second place).
