= General Union of Growers =

Trade union of Italy

The General Union of Growers (Italian: Unione Generale Coltivatori, UGC) is a trade union representing self-employed farmers and smallholders in Italy.

The union was founded in 1983, through a merger involving the Italian Federation of Sharecroppers and Smallholders. Like that union, it affiliated to the Italian Confederation of Workers' Trade Unions. By 1998, the union had 70,659 members. Pietro Monelli became president of the union in 2014, at which time it still claimed more than 70,000 members.
