= Federation of Energy, Fashion, Chemistry and Related Workers =

Trade union of Italy

The Federation of Energy, Fashion, Chemistry and Related Workers (Italian: Federazione Energia, Moda, Chimica e Affini, FEMCA) is a trade union representing industrial workers in Italy.

The union was founded in 2001, when the Federation of Energy, Resource, Chemical and Related Workers merged with the Italian Federation of Textile and Clothing Workers. Like both its predecessors, the union affiliated to the Italian Confederation of Workers' Trade Unions. On founding, the union had about 160,000 members, and was led by Renzo Bellini. In 2017, Nora Garofalo became the first woman to lead the union.

== General Secretaries ==
2001: Renzo Bellini
2000s: Sergio Gigli
2015: Angelo Colombini
2017: Nora Garofalo
