= Italian Federation of Chemical Workers =

Trade union of Italy

The Italian Federation of Chemical Workers (Italian: Federazione Italiana Lavoratori Chimici, FILC) was a trade union representing workers in the chemical industry in Italy.

The union was founded in 1901, as the Italian Chemical Workers' Federation, and was a founding affiliate of the General Confederation of Labour. It was banned by the fascist government in 1926, but re-established after World War II, when it affiliated to the recently formed Italian General Confederation of Labour. By 1954, it had 123,286 members.

In 1960, the union merged with the Italian Union of Oil Workers, to form the Italian Federation of Chemical and Oil Workers.

== General Secretaries ==
1945: Roberto Cuzzaniti
1946: Italo Viglianesi
1949: Eugenio Guidi
1954: Luciano Lama
