= Horticulture, Agriculture and Forestry Union =

Former West German trade union

GGLF
- Horticulture, Agriculture and Forestry Union
- Gewerkschaft Gartenbau, Land- und Forstwirtschaft
- Merged into: IG BAU
- Founded: July 1949
- Dissolved: 1996
- Members: 90,281
- Affiliations: DGB

The Horticulture, Agriculture and Forestry Union (German: Gewerkschaft Gartenbau, Land- und Forstwirtschaft, GGLF) was a West German trade union representing agricultural and forestry workers.

The union was founded in July 1949, and was a founding member of the German Trade Union Confederation (DGB) in October of that same year. In 1995 the GGLF claimed 90,281 members and in 1996 the union merged with the Building and Construction Union to form IG Bauen-Agrar-Umwelt (IG BAU).

== Presidents ==
1949: Friedrich Greve
1956: Heinz Frehsee
1959: Hellmut Schmalz
1968: Alfons Lappas
1969: Alois Pfeiffer
1975: Willi Lojewski
1987: Günther Lappas
1993: Hans-Joachim Wilms
