= Eugen Ochs =

Politician (1905–1990)

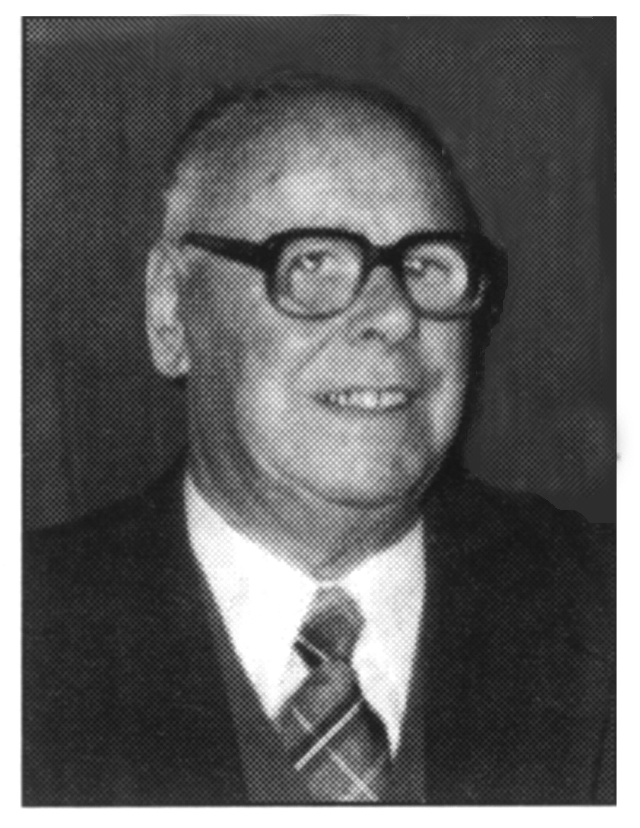
- 1985
- Born: 4 April 1905; Stuttgart, Württemberg, Germany
- Died: 17 November 1990 (aged 85); Ludwigsburg, Baden-Württemberg, Germany
- Occupation: Trades union leader
- Spouse: Johanna Semmler

Eugen Ochs (4 April 1905 - 17 November 1990) was a communist politician and trades union leader.

== Life ==
Eugen Ochs was born in Stuttgart where he grew up in a working-class family. After attending junior and middle schools he embarked on an apprenticeship as a mechanical engineer with Daimler Benz in Stuttgart-Untertürkheim. In 1921 he joined the German Metal Workers' Union ("Deutscher Metallarbeiter-Verband" / DMV) and became a volunteer union official as a youth representative and works council member. He was there in 1920 when the Daimler workers - led by Communists - organised a strike against newly introduced direct deductions of income tax before payment of wages. The strike came at a time of political unrest and acute economic austerity, and it led to fierce confrontations: the military became involved and the plant was closed down for four weeks.

In many ways it was the experiences of the First World War and its catastrophic aftermath that awakened Ochs politically, and shaped permanently his political beliefs. In or before 1923 he joined the Young Communists and volunteered for political work. He joined the Communist Party itself in 1925, but within the context of party as then configured he was a member of the more moderate wing, and when the party split he was one of those who found themselves expelled by the Stalinist party leadership in 1928. He was part of the group that went off to form the so-called Communist Party of Germany - Opposition ("Kommunistische Partei Deutschlands - Opposition" / KPDO) He opposed the extremism of the Revolutionary Union Opposition ("Revolutionäre Gewerkschafts Opposition" / RGO) and was among the first to call for a united front between Communists and Social Democrats as a way to block the rising tide of nationalist populism.

Eugen Ochs was one of those who had recognised very early on that Hitlerism represented a great danger to liberty, democracy and individual rights; and he did not see the success of Nazism simply as a failure by politicians. In January 1933 the Nazis took power and lost little time in transforming Germany into a one-party dictatorship. Ochs joined with politically like-minded comrades to become an opposition activist and working to build up political resistance in the Stuttgart area. The aim was to gather and collect information about the major industrial companies in the area, and their attitudes/relationships in respect of the Nazi authorities. He also acted as a courier, maintaining links with the party leadership in political exile abroad.

Political activism (except on behalf of the Nazi party) had been illegal since the early part of 1933, and Ochs was arrested towards the end of 1934. He was held for one and a half years in investigatory custody after which he faced trial. He was sentenced to a four year jail term. He was held in prison at Ludwigsburg from 1936 till 1938. Like many with a record of anti-Nazi politics before 1933, when his sentence was expunged, instead of being released he was interned in a succession of detention camps. In 1939 he was transferred to concentration camps at Welzheim and Dachau. Between 1939 and 1945 he was held at the Buchenwald concentration camp. The period 1939 - 1945 coincided with the Second World War, and as slaughter on the frontline continued there was a shortage of politically reliable men to serve at the concentration camps, with the result that inside the camps daily administration was increasingly delegated to inmates. At Buchenwald Ochs was a member of a resistance group within the camp. He was able to maintain close contacts with former political comrades from their time together as breakaway communists in the KPDO, notably Willi Bleicher, Ludwig Becker and Robert Siewert.

On 11 April 1945 Ochs and the others were freed from Buchenwald by American troops. Ochs had been in state detention for more than ten years. It was like being "born again" ("... wie neu geboren") he later recalled. He sought out Johanna Semmler who had been one of those convicted and sentenced alongside him back in 1936 and the two of them were finally able to marry. He now devoted himself at once to rebuilding a new metal workers' union in the Stuttgart region. Directly after the war he joined the Communist Party. However, from the perspective of Stuttgart and the rest of the American occupation zone (after May 1949 The German Federal Republic / West Germany), the German Communist Party rapidly came to be seen as little more than a proxy for Soviet foreign policy, and as Cold War tensions crystallised, Ochs resigned his Communist Party membership "on political grounds". Instead he backed the Gruppe Arbeiterpolitik, a fringe political grouping that attempted to recreate the political traditions of the prewar KPDO. He would always reject the policies of the centre-left Social Democratic party. Towards the end of his career he moved from Stuttgart to nearby Ludwigsburg to create a local IG Metall branch in response to massive industry-based expansion of the city. He retired in 1970 and wrote his memoires.
