= Toni Sender =

German socialist, feminist, politician and journalist

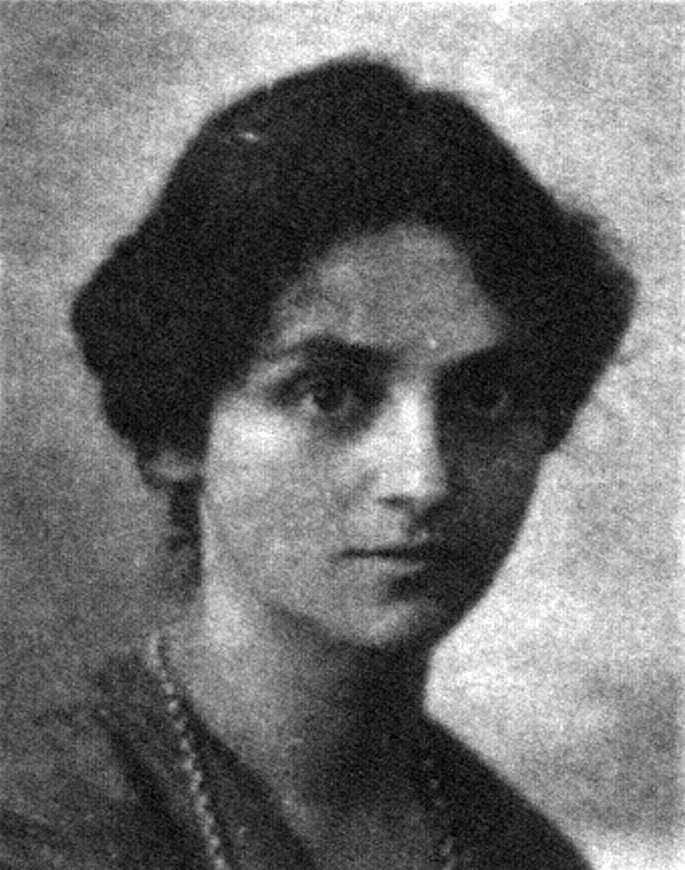
- Sender c. 1920

Member of the Reichstag for Hesse-Nassau
- In office 24 June 1920 – 28 February 1933
- Preceded by: Office established
- Succeeded by: Office abolished

Personal details
- Born: 29 November 1888 Biebrich, Province of Hesse-Nassau, Kingdom of Prussia, German Empire
- Died: 26 June 1964 (aged 75) New York City, New York, U.S.
- Resting place: Beth Israel Cemetery, Woodbridge, New Jersey
- Party: SPD (1910–1917, 1922–1933); USPD (1917–1922)
- Other political affiliations: SFIO (1910–1914)
- Occupation: Politician; Journalist; Trade Unionist; Women's Rights Activist

Toni Sender (or Tony Sender) (29 November 1888 – 26 June 1964) was a German socialist, feminist, journalist, trade unionist and politician who served as a member of the Reichstag from 1920 to 1933. She was active in left-wing German politics in the World War I and Interwar periods before fleeing Germany once the Nazis took power. In exile, she campaigned against the Nazis and for aiding refugees, going on to work for the Office of Strategic Services, the United Nations, and several labor unions.

== Early life ==
Toni Sender was born into an Orthodox Jewish family with the name Sidonie Zippora Sender. Her father was Moritz Sender, an influential businessman in the local Jewish community. Her mother was Marie, née Dreyfus: both her parents were Orthodox Jews. Her sister, Rachel married the sculptor Fred Kormis. However, Toni surprised her family by insisting that she wished to learn a profession. When she was just thirteen, having successfully completed her time at the girls' school to which her parents had sent her, she left home and headed for nearby Frankfurt where she enrolled at a private business school for girls (Handelsschule für Mädchen). As she later explained, she wanted to be "in charge of her own life" as soon as possible, not just economically but also spiritually, mentally and in the way she lived her life. Despite coming from a relatively affluent family, by the time she was sixteen she was earning her own money. She joined the Social Democratic Party of Germany (SPD) in 1910, but shortly left to work for the Paris branch of a German metal firm. There she joined the French Section of the Workers' International, being particularly impressed by Jean Jaurès. She returned to Germany shortly after his assassination in July 1914.

== World War I ==
Sender's return journey to Germany happened during the mass mobilisation of the First World War. Although she travelled back via Switzerland, she was only able to make her way back to Biebrich thanks to help from soldiers on their way to the front. Her family doctor invited her to join the staff at a local hospital and help treat the wounded. However she soon concluded that her principal role was to patch up wounded soldiers so that they could be sent back to the front as soon as possible. So when she was invited to work in Frankfurt for the metal company which had previously employed her before the war, she readily accepted – although this too involved war-work, as did virtually all jobs in war-time Germany. Nevertheless, her work made her aware of many secrets which would have been valuable to the anti-war movement. Sender decided to compartmentalise her life, seeing it as a matter of honour not to disclose secrets discovered at work to her political colleagues. When the SPD voted for war credits, Sender considered leaving the party. She then heard that an anti-war opposition group had formed within the party and that Robert Dissmann was the local organiser. Dissmann was an official with the German Metal Workers' Union.

Sender met Dissmann in the summer of 1916. Dissmann had just been meeting with Rosa Luxemburg shortly before she was imprisoned. Dissmann soon recruited her to join the anti-war faction within the SPD. When Max Quarck, the sitting SPD member of the Reichstag, addressed a meeting in favour of the war credits, Sender spoke against him. However such opportunities for debate became rarer as the majority disregarded the rights of the minority. Dissman decided to set up the anti-war minority through establishing a local section of the National Federation of Proletarian Thinkers as a front organisation. He asked Sender to take on the role of organising it. Their attempts to disguise their political purpose were often ineffective and they were subject to police surveillance. Often, they had meeting venues cancel their bookings. Sender claimed that the military authorities also took an interest in them, resulting in many of their members being called up for the army.

She attended the Third International Socialist Women's Conference held at Bern March 26–28, 1915, where she encountered Lenin's manipulation of the Bolshevik Women's delegation and took a dislike to Karl Radek who was acting as Lenin's aid.

== German Revolution and Weimar Republic ==
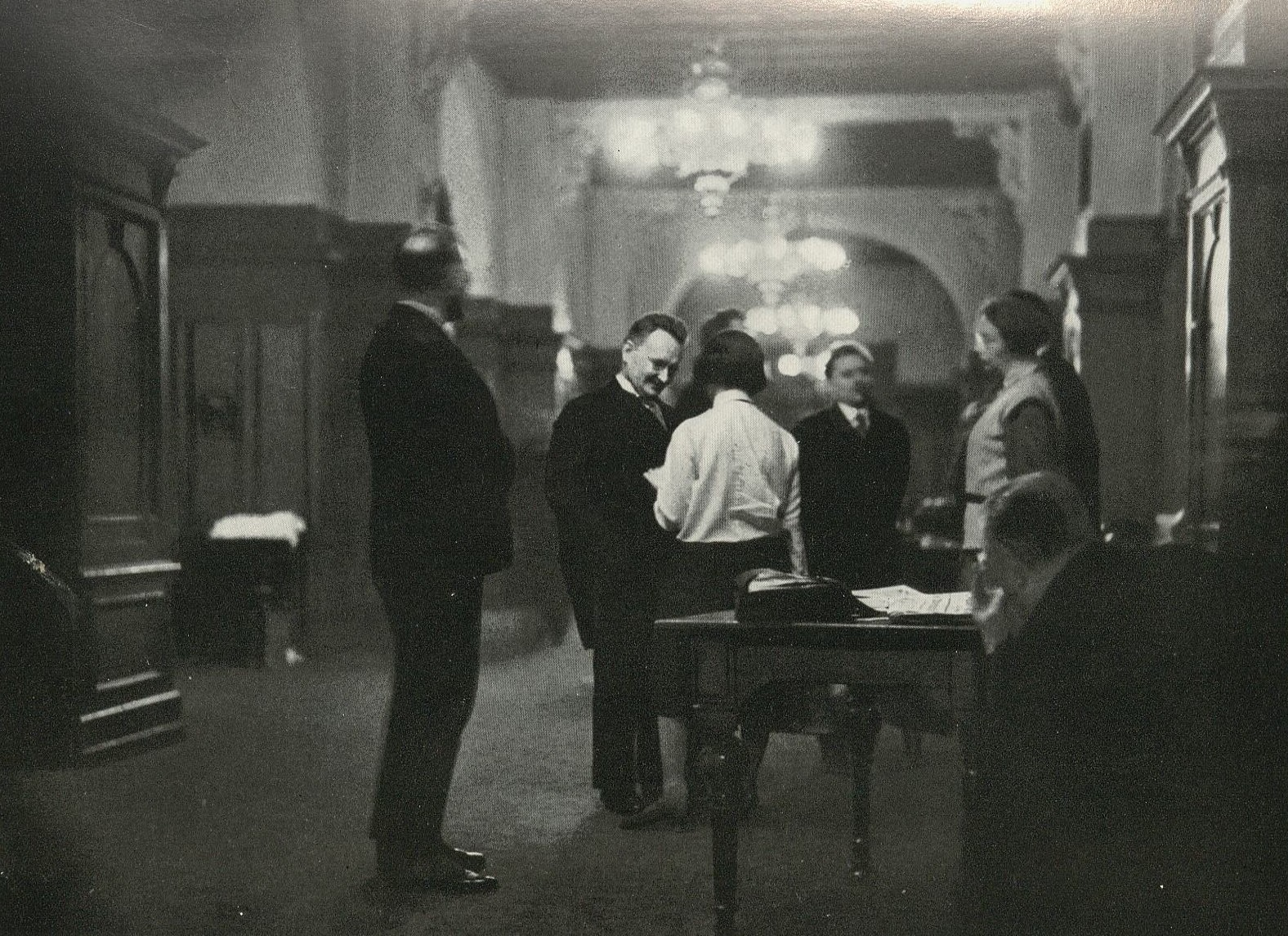
Sender speaking with fellow reichstag deputy Paul Löbe c. 1920s

Sender was an active participant in the German Revolution of 1918–19. She became a regional leader within her home of Frankfurt, upon which much of Southwest Germany depended. She was the only female member of the Frankfurt Workers' and Soldiers' Council, speaking publicly in favor of the Revolution and mediating conflicts, some violent. She was in favor of the council system advocated for by the communists, but disapproved of their undemocratic methods. She eventually became the editor of the Volksrecht, the newsletter of the revolutionaries, which she would continue to edit for the rest of the Revolution. She also lead the Board of Aldermen of Frankfurt am Main, a typically conservative organization, as a voice for the Revolution within the basic governance of the city.

Sender was elected to the Reichstag in 1920, sitting as a member of the USPD (Independent Social Democratic Party of Germany), which had broken away from the SPD three years earlier following intensifying internal party ructions over support for war funding. Two years later the USPD itself broke apart, with most of its members joining the recently formed Communist Party. Toni Sender was one of the smaller number who in September 1922 returned to the SPD. She continued to serve as a Reichstag deputy until 1933, and from 1927 as editor of the Frauenwelt, taking a particular interest in issues involving trade and tariffs.

== In exile ==
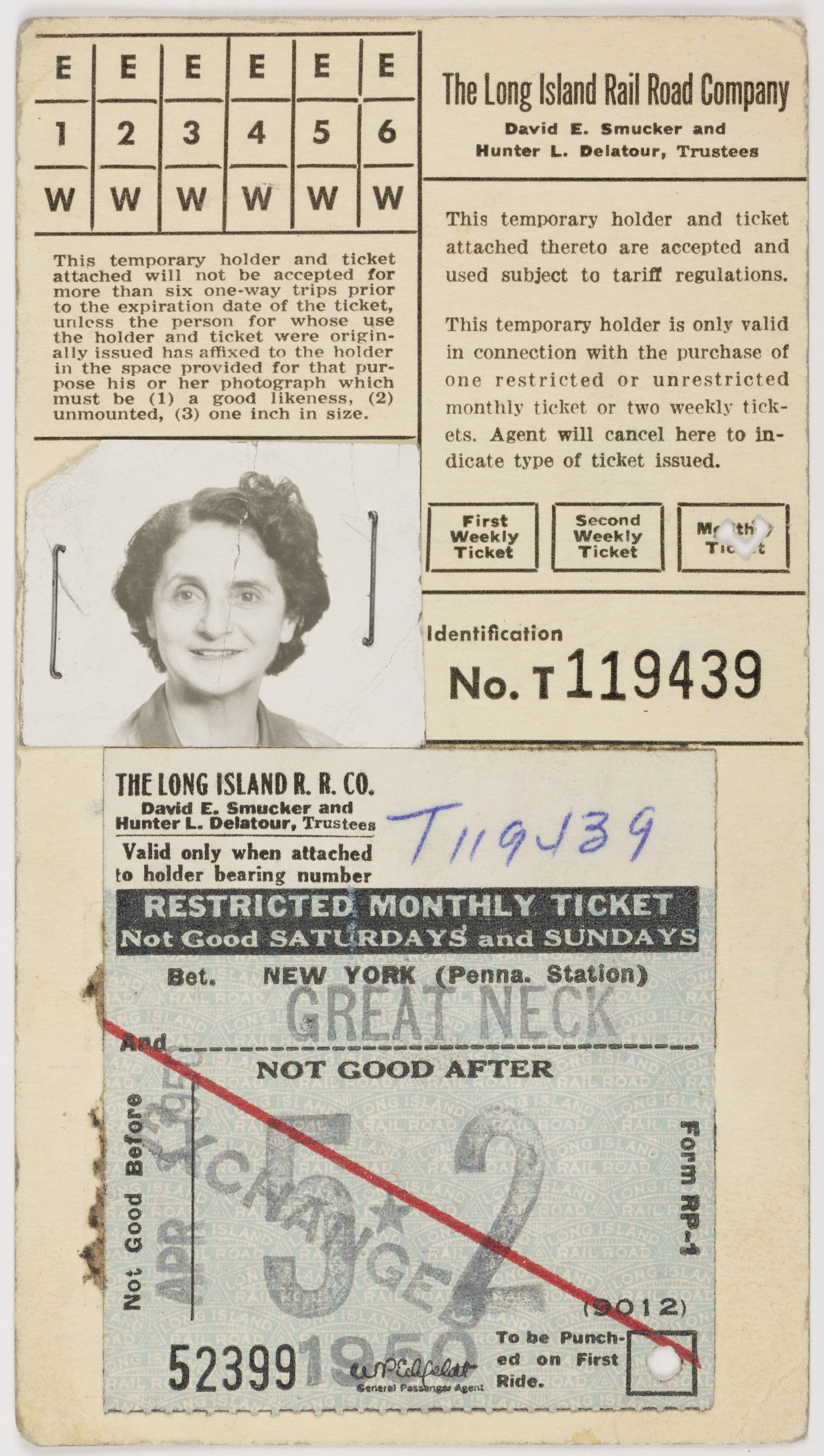
Sender's monthly pass for the Long Island Rail Road, 1950

Sender fled to Czechoslovakia in March 1933 following the Nazis' seizure of power. Her archive at the State Historical Society of Wisconsin is sparse as regards her time in Germany as she was unable to bring any of her papers with her. She then made her way to Belgium before emigrating to the United States in 1935. She settled in the US, being granted US citizenship in 1944. She would never return to Germany. She joined the International Confederation of Free Trade Unions shortly after its foundation in 1949.

== Tony Sender Award ==
In 1992, the city of Frankfurt created the Tony Sender Award for women who defend the equal rights of both men and women in the face of discrimination. It is awarded every two years.

== Selected writings ==
- "Die Frauen und das Rätesystem", ("Women and the Council System") speech to the Leipzig Women's Conference on 29 November 1919. Berlin: Freiheit (Women's Library of the USPD)
- "Diktatur über das Proletariat oder: Diktatur des Proletariats: Das Ergebnis von Moskau" ("Dictatorship over the Proletariat or: Dictatorship of the Proletariat: The Result of Moscow") Frankfurt: Volksrecht, 1920
- "Fünf Jahre nach der Novemberrevolution!" lecture, held at the Saxon State Party Congress of the USPD on December 1, 1923 Zwickau: District board of the VSPD, 1924.
- "Does Stalin Dare Lift the Curtain?" published in The Federationist (published by the American Federation of Labor) in June 1951
