= Hans Rasmussen =

Hans Rasmussen is the name of:

- Hans Rasmussen (baseball) (1895–1949), American baseball player
- Hans Rasmussen (trade unionist) (1902–1996), Danish trade unionist and politician
- Hans Kjeld Rasmussen (born 1954), Danish sports shooter
