= Ludwig Becker (politician) =

German politician and journalist (1892–1974)

Ludwig Becker (25 October 1892 – 4 April 1974) was a German politician, member of the Communist Party of Germany, and trade unionist who participated in illegal political opposition during the Nazi years.

== Life ==
=== In the labour movement ===
Ludwig Becker was born and grew up in Schwäbisch Gmünd, a midsized town in the hills to the east of Stuttgart. His father was a socialist and a Goldsmith, the trade in which he, too, was apprenticed. His apprenticeship completed, he travelled the country as a wandering journeyman goldsmith in order learn from a variety of more experienced practitioners. That was when he came into contact with the rapidly evolving Labour movement. In 1907 he joined both the Metal Workers' Union ("Deutscher Metallarbeiter-Verband" / DMV) and the Young Socialists. In 1910, when only 18 years old, he joined the Social Democrats ("Sozialdemokratische Partei Deutschlands" / SPD). A year later he relocated from Gmünd to Berlin: here he was picked out for a study course at the SPD National Party Academy where the lecturers included Rosa Luxemburg, a formidable political philosopher and an inspiring lecturer who had already become an iconic leader of the German left.

Becker was opposed to the war: between 1913 and 1918 he was nevertheless called up for military service and took part in it. From the frontline he established and maintained increasingly close links with the leftist Westmeyer wing of the party in Stuttgart. Accordingly, he was one of those deeply critical of the decision of the party leadership to implement what amounted to a parliamentary truce over funding for the war. He became a member of the Spartacus League. During the series of revolutions that erupted during 1918/1919 Becker, following his election by revolutionary comrades, participated actively as a leader in the soldiers' and workers' council/soviet movement. At the end of 1918 the Spartacus League in effect became the Communist Party of Germany. Becker remained a party activist.

=== Communist party politics and Communist Party (Opposition) politics ===
Becker continued to work as a goldsmith till 1922. In 1923 he was a delegate at the 8th Party Congress of the Communist Party. On 23 November 1923 the party was temporarily outlawed and at the start of 1924 he was arrested in connection with his political activities. On 27 September 1924 he was sentenced to a six-month jail term. However, on 24 May 1924 he had been elected to the Württemberg regional parliament (Landtag) which conferred a measure of parliamentary immunity: he was released early from jail. From July 1925 he was a [paid party official, working as Party Secretary for the party at its Stuttgart office. Politically he was by now seen as part of the party's "right-wing", although it could have been argued that as hardline Stalinists took control of the levers of power, it was the party itself that had shifted. He was re-elected as a Communist member to the Württemberg regional parliament in 1928.

The increasingly uncompromising approach taken by the party in Moscow to removing from positions of influence those whose personal loyalty the leader doubted found direct echoes in the German party. Becker spoke out against the increasingly Stalinist approach of the German party leadership and the doctrine of Social fascism which branded critics from within the party as "fascists". He was one of those excluded from the German party, and in 1929 joined the so-called Communist Party (Opposition), an alternative communist party comprising people expelled by the original communist party. He continued to sit in the regional parliament (Landtag), representing the "Opposition" communist party, till 1932. Between December 1930 and 1933 he was the authorized representative (Bevollmächtigter) of the DMV in Schwenningen, centre of the watch and clock making business in southern Germany. He was editor of "Aufstieg" and a member of Naturfreunde, the left-wing "friends of nature" organisation.

=== Nazi years ===
The Nazi Party took power in January 1933 and lost no time in transforming Germany into a one-party dictatorship. The trades unions were outlawed, and replaced by the Government's own Labour Front ("Deutsche Arbeitsfront" / DAF) organisation. Attempts were made to win Becker over to the DAF, but he resisted these, concentrating for the most part on work in the metals industrial sector. He was arrested in 1938 or 1939, though it is not clear whether this was solely on account of his political activism before 1933 or because he was suspected of (since 1933) political or trades union activity more recently.

He was taken initially to the Hohenasperg, a large hilltop fortress to the north of Stuttgart which was being used to accommodate political prisoners, before being transferred to the Buchenwald concentration camp, where he was detained till 1945. In the camp he was active as an organiser of "illegal political and military activities". He met up with two other Communist Party (Opposition) comrades from the years before the Nazi takeover, Willi Bleicher, Eugen Ochs and Robert Siewert. They worked closely together. After the German failure to conquer the Soviet Union it became possible to contemplate a post-Nazi future. The so-called "Buchenwald Manifesto", produced in 1945, can be seen as evidence of the determination of former communist inmates and SPD inmates to work together after the war, and avoid the divisions on the political left which many believed had opened the way for the Nazi take-over during the build-up to 1933.

=== Years of reconstruction ===
War ended in May 1945 and attention turned to the urgent tasks of reconstruction. Becker returned to Schwenningen, by now part of the French occupation zone (and after May 1949 part of the German Federal Republic / West Germany). His focus was on rebuilding the Communist Party and the metal workers' trades union, relaunched in 1949 as IG Metall. For several months in 1945 he served as deputy mayor of Schwenningen - still at this point a post filled by appointment rather than through election. In 1948 he became regional head of the union for South Württemberg-Hohenzollern. He also sat, elected as one of the five communist members, in the regional parliament (Landtag) for Württemberg-Hohenzollern between 1947 and 1951.

In May 1951 he was excluded from the Communist Party after he failed to back a party resolution ("These 37"). (The resolution, presumably inspired from East Berlin and Moscow, had condemned trades unions in West Germany for putting themselves "at the service ... of American imperialism and in league with the German monopolists".) Between 1953 and 1959, based in Stuttgart, he served as regional chief of IG Metall in Württemberg-Baden (later Baden-Württemberg).

In or before 1969, Ludwig Becker retired from his remaining duties with IG Metall. He died in Bad Cannstatt - by this time a district of Stuttgart - on 4 April 1974.
