= Eugen Loderer =

German trade union leader

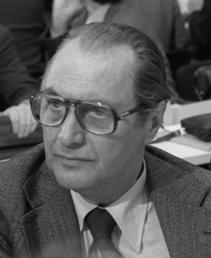
Eugen Loderer in 1978

Eugen Loderer (28 May 1920 – 9 February 1995) was a German trade union leader.

Born in Heidenheim an der Brenz, Loderer undertook an apprenticeship as a metal cloth maker, but was called up to serve in the navy before he could complete this. He served until May 1945, when he was captured by the British. He returned to his former career, and joined the Iron and Metal Industry Association, which soon became part of IG Metall. He joined the Social Democratic Party (SPD), and gradually rose to more prominent positions in the union. From 1959, he was its district secretary for youth work and shop stewards.

IG Metall was affiliated to the German Trade Union Confederation (DGB), and in 1963, Loderer was elected as the federation's Baden-Württemberg district secretary. In 1966, he took a leading role in an anti-fascist rally outside the conference of the National Democratic Party of Germany, and this propelled him to national attention.

In 1968, Loderer was elected as deputy president of IG Metall, with the backing of president Otto Brenner. He was the union's lead on public relations, human resources, organisation, and administration. Brenner died in 1972, and Loderer was elected as his successor. While Loderer initially campaigned on issues such as banning lockouts, and expanding the role of workers in company management, the economic crisis led him to a more defensive position, and a focus on collective bargaining. He also presided over five major strikes. He was staunchly opposed to communists in the union, or to any co-operation with unions affiliated to the communist World Federation of Trade Unions, and criticised the peace movement for not spending enough time attacking the Soviet Union.

In 1974, Loderer was elected as president of the International Metalworkers' Federation. He was elected in the European Parliament election, 1979, for the SPD in Hesse, but he stood down in January 1980, as he found the workload was incompatible with remaining leader of the union. He retired from his trade union roles in 1983, and later moved back to Heidenheim.

Trade union offices
Preceded by Post vacant	Deputy President of IG Metall; 1968–1972	Succeeded by Hans Mayr
Preceded by Otto Brenner	President of IG Metall; 1972–1983	Succeeded by Hans Mayr
Preceded by Hans Rasmussen	President of the International Metalworkers' Federation; 1974–1983	Succeeded by Hans Mayr
