= Ludwig Becker =

Ludwig Becker may refer to:

- Ludwig Becker (explorer) (1808–1861), German-born artist, explorer and naturalist
- Ludwig Hugo Becker (1834–1868), German painter and etcher
- Ludwig Becker (architect) (1855–1940), German architect, church and cathedral master builder
- Ludwig Becker (astronomer) (1860–1947), Scottish astronomer
- Ludwig Becker (politician) (1892–1974), German trades unionist, politician and resistance activist
- Ludwig Becker (pilot) (1911–1943), Luftwaffe fighter ace during World War II
