= Jörg Hoffmann =

Jörg Hoffmann may refer to:

- Jörg Hoffmann (luger) (born 1963), East German luger
- Jörg Hoffmann (swimmer) (born 1970), former freestyle swimmer from Germany
- Jörg Hofmann (trade unionist) (born 1956), German trade union leader
