= Zwickel =

Zwickel may refer to:

- Zwickelbier, a German lager
- Zwickel (card game), a north German card game its feature of sweeping all the cards off the table
- Klaus Zwickel (born 1939), German trade union leader
