= Franz Steinkühler =

German business consultant and trade union leader

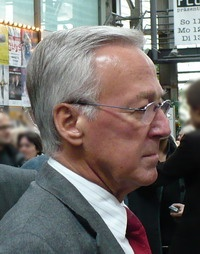
- 2007
- Born: 20 May 1937 (age 89); Würzburg (Mainfranken), Franken (Franconia), Germany
- Occupations: Trades Union official Trades Union leader Company Director; Business Consultant
- Known for: successfully leading a six year campaign for the introduction to German manufacturing and/or engineering companies of a 35-hour working week
- Political party: SPD

Franz Steinkühler (born 20 May 1937) is a German business consultant and former trade union leader. He served between 1986 and 1993 as the director of the powerful "IG Metall" (Metal workers' Trades Union), which after 1990, following what amounted to a take-over of its hitherto separate East German counterpart, became the largest trade union in the western world, in terms of membership numbers.

== Life ==
=== Provenance and early years ===
Franz Steinkühler was born in Würzburg. His father worked as an electrician at the time of his birth, but later switched to a career with the police service. During the war, which broke out in September 1939, much of Würzburg, which was still in large part a timber built city, was destroyed by Anglo-American bombing and a particularly destructive resulting fire storm. Survivors, including the Steinkühler family, were evacuated to Lower Bavaria. They subsequently relocated again, this time to Göppingen (Stuttgart) in Württemberg.

Steinkühler attended middle-school in Göppingen and then completed an apprenticeship as a toolmaker. Progress was unusually rapid: before reaching the age of 21 he had already obtained the associated Master's Certificate. He had planned to move on at this point to the Esslingen Engineering College ("Esslinger Ingenieurschule"), but family funds were insufficient to support this move, so he instead trained in business development, attending evening classes organised by the REFA. His first job following completion of his apprenticeship was as a time keeper and job scheduler with a manufacturing business in Göppingen. He became actively engaged with the works council at the age of 14. In 1959/60 - still in Göppingen - Steinkühler was elected Works Council Chairman ("Betriebsratsvorsitzender"). Meanwhile he had joined the Social Democratic Party (SPD) in 1951.

=== IG Metall ===
As Steinkühler himself later pointed out, his first post-apprenticeship position as a time keeper and job scheduler came with its own contradictions and personal dilemmas:

* "With this job I had no choice but to shit on my mates, whether or not I wanted to."

* "Bei dieser Tätigkeit blieb mir gar nichts anderes übrig, als die Kumpel zu bescheißen, ob ich wollte oder nicht."

Franz Steinkühler, quoted in his 1998 Munzinger biography entry

He had embarked on his apprenticeship in 1953, when he joined the Stuttgart branch of "IG Metall", the metal workers' union. In 1963, he became the Stuttgart district secretary of the union. In 1972, that he succeeded Willi Bleicher as the union's Baden-Württemberg regional director. Baden-Württemberg, with Stuttgart at its heart, was particularly important for IG Metall, due to the presence in the region of several profitable and prestigious manufacturing, and engineering companies, including Daimler Benz. During a decade, in which politicians and commentators were much preoccupied by currency inflation, Steinkühler led the union team on a succession of wage negotiation rounds, acquiring a reputation as a cunning, well-briefed and stubborn negotiator. He famously led a successful campaign for formal recognition by managements of factory workers' rights to what came to be known - with a characteristic directness which he himself has always relished - as "Steinkühler-Pinkelpause" ("Steinkühler piss breaks") of up to five minutes per hour in respect of "personal necessities". (In reality, implementation by employers has not been uniform.) The 1978 strike which won this important concession is celebrated by admiring commentators as part of a life-long commitment on the part of Franz Steinkühler to the "Humanisierung der Arbeit" (loosely, "humanising the work-place").

=== Leadership and progress on workers' rights ===
Twenty-five years after its implementation, Steinkühler was still finding it necessary to defend his union's victory in the campaign for a 35-hour working week:

* "The 35-hour week created and secured hundreds of thousands of jobs, and that was good for the workers! it was only from the capitalist side that it made any sense if some people pushed themselves to the point of total exhaustion out of simple fear of unemployment, while others were left humbly just hoping to get a job"."

* "Die 35-Stunden-Woche hat Hundertausende Arbeitsplätze geschaffen und gesichert und das war gut für die Menschen! Nur für die Kapitalseite macht es Sinn, wenn die Einen aus Angst vor Arbeitslosigkeit bis zur Erschöpfung schuften und die Anderen demütig hoffen, Arbeit zu bekommen."

Franz Steinkühler, quoted in 2019 by IG Metall

In October 1983, Steinkühler was elected vice-president of IG Metall: then in October 1986, he was elected to the union's presidency following the retirement from the role of Hans Mayr. In 1984, while still in the position of vice-president, he launched IGM's campaign for a 35-hour working week in Baden-Württemberg. During the next five years there were several high-profile strikes (and several more threats of strikes) in pursuit of the objective, which encountered significant opposition from the manufacturing businesses affected. The necessary agreement was nevertheless reached with the employers' negotiating body in 1990 for a step-by-step transition to a 35-hour working week, and by the end of 1995 the policy was, broadly speaking, in place, although it has remained controversial in some quarters.

From 1987, Steinkühler also served as president of the International Metalworkers' Federation.

=== The affair ===
His leading role within IG Metall meant that Steinkühler was also a member of the supervisory board of the company known, at that time, as Daimler-Benz AG. His well-founded reputation as tough and merciless negotiator had, for many years, made him a nightmarish trades union partner for employers. Franz Steinkühler was not a man without enemies. During the first part of 1993 Michael Backhaus, a contributing editor based at the Bonn office of the news magazine Stern, with a reputation as a high-profile investigative journalist, received a telephone call. The identity of his interlocutor was, and remains, unknown. The caller provided information concerning significant stock purchases in the company "Mercedes Aktien Holding" allegedly made on behalf of Franz Steinkühler during March 1993 by a bank. The purchases had been made shortly before the investee company was merged into Daimler-Benz AG. The merger, when it took place, led to a significant increase in the value of the stock. At the time of the alleged stock purchases, merger plans would have been secret, although it seemed reasonable to assume that they would already have been discussed at meetings of the Daimler-Benz AG supervisory board. The evidence provided appeared overwhelmingly circumstantial, but Backhaus was persuaded by what he heard that he might be looking at a story of insider dealing by a well-known public figure. His informant declined to provide contact details, but it was agreed that he would phone back with more answers at a future (unspecified) date. Backhaus, meanwhile, embarked on a series of enquiries of his own into the allegations. In the eyes of many enemies in the political, industrial and media establishments, Franz Steinkühler was far too fond of demonizing money-love and speculation of all kinds, which would give the story significant added piquancy. Eventually the unidentified informant called again, this time with precise details concerning dates and amounts. The informant now alleged that on 18 March 1993 Steinkühler had purchased almost a quarter of a million Marks worth of shares in "Mercedes Aktien Holding" through his bank. A second similar purchase had followed, the informant said, a week later. Then, just one day before a crucial meeting of the Daimler-Benz AG supervisory board, an even larger tranche of shares was reported to have been purchased, this time in the name of Steinkühler's ten year old son. Four weeks after that the value of the shares in question would have risen by more than 100,000 Marks. (Precise estimates published of the "paper profits" involved vary widely.) Early in May 1993 the journalist held a breakfast meeting with (as he believed) his informant at a Steigenberger Hotel. Backhaus was accompanied by a stock market expert. The presumed informant answered a number of further detailed questions, many of them of a somewhat technical nature, and provided an identity card confirming his personal details. A six figure amount (provided by Gruner + Jahr, publishers of Stern) was handed over. Michael Backhaus and his expert left the meeting believing that they had sufficiently "stood up" their story, and the presumed informant left the meeting with a large amount of money. (Later it transpired that the man Backhaus and his expert colleague had met at the Steigenberger Hotel was not his telephone informant but his telephone informant's well briefed lawyer.)

On 15 May 1993 Franz Steinkühler returned home from a meeting in Geneva and received a telephone call from the journalist Michael Backhaus. Steinkühler listened while the facts alleged were presented to him and then gave his reaction: "The facts are agreed" ("Die Fakten stimmen"), but the interpretation being placed on them by Backhaus was false. And it was indeed the case that there was nothing illegal about the "insider dealing" as alleged by Backhaus (although some commentators indicate that it could have been illegal if certain of the events alleged had occurred following changes in the law introduced in 1994). There was nothing in the conversation between the two men that persuaded Backhaus that he should not go ahead and have the story printed by Stern. The following Monday Stern, following its normal practice, provided advance notice of their scoop to newspapers on the media circuit. On Tuesday the outline of what would become known as the "Steinkühler Affair" featured in all the daily newspapers. That same day Franz Steinkühler give a press conference in order to contextualise the reports emerging: it went very badly. The next day anxious officials from around 200 local offices called the IG Metall head office in Frankfurt. Involvement in this level of what felt like "high finance" was the last thing that members would have expected from the scourge of big business. Pentecost that year fell on 20 May which was accordingly a public holiday. Stern therefore appeared not on the Thursday of that week but on Wednesday 19 May 1993. The Michael Backhaus story was in it. It seemed initially that Franz Steinkühler was determined to "tough it out". No laws had been broken - at least not by him - and there was important work to be done. To be sure, there had been serious breaches of some of the strongest Banking Secrecy laws in the world: nevertheless, the mainstream press were more interested in the Steinkühler story than in the BfB (bank) story. It became clear that a second Backhaus story in next week's Stern would include more information on another questionable share trade. The story duly appeared under the headline "Wie stehen die Aktien, Franz?" ("How are the shares, Franz?"). The wider media storm intensified. Regardless of any rights and wrongs of the matters reported, he had suffered terrible reputational damage. On 25 May 1993, following suspicions that he had used knowledge gained through his position as a member of the supervisory board of Daimler-Benz A.G. to engage in insider trading, Franz Steinkühler's resignation as leader of IG Metall was accepted. He was succeeded, both in his IG Metall leadership roles and as president of the International Metalworkers' Federation, by his deputy, Klaus Zwickel.

=== After IG Metall ===
Following the loss of his trades union positions Steinkühler became a freelance business and property consultant.

Franz Steinkühler was back in the headlines again in 1996, this time in connection with the so-called "Real estate affair". Reporting was noticeably more enthusiastic (and critical) in publications with close links to big business than in those of the political centre and left. The catalyst was a report commissioned by IG Metall from an investigatory commission chaired by Horst Henrichs (who at that time was president of the Frankfurt region District High Court) into the purchase of a prestigious new headquarters building for IG Metall at Lyoner Straße 32 in Frankfurt-Niederrad. The core finding that found its way into the news media was that, through a combination of carelessness and hubris, union directors had agreed to pay far more for the property than it was worth. The commission heard evidence that an independent expert valuation had been commissioned only after the purchase price had been agreed, and it was said that the independent expert had been instructed to "support a valuation justifying the negotiated price [already] negotiated". No second expert valuation had been sought, despite the large amount of money involved. Although much of the blame for the debacle went, in the report itself, to a senior IG Metall financial officer called Werner Schreiber (whom some reports implied was hopelessly out of his depth, and who subsequently resigned), hostile media reports of the affair insisted that Franz Steinkühler's hands were all over the deal. It was reported that before providing his evidence Werner Schreiber had received assurances from his department head, Willi Teeuwen, that information provided to the Horst Heinrichs commission was not intended for "public disclosure or for submission to the banks". Willi Teeuwen's own testimony was also particularly damning in respect of Steinkühler's role in the affair. Reports surfaced that IG Metall had at one stage considered launching a legal action for recovery of damages against Steinkühler; but that never happened. Despite the deeply unfriendly nature of much of the press reporting, there is no indication of any personal enrichment by Steinkühler being suspected or alleged. On many of the key issues over which the Henrichs report might have been expected to provide clear conclusions, the report appears scrupulously to have held back from providing any. That only increased the scope and temptation for intensified adverse media speculation on behalf of those who wished Steinkühler ill. Press reports from the political left and centre were far less salacious, but they hardly amounted to a ringing endorsement. The reputational damage was real. Earlier speculation that his resignation from IG Metall might open the way for Franz Steinkühler to accept a top job with another trades union, or even a role as an EU Commissioner in Brussels, melted rapidly away.

Trade union offices
Preceded by Hans Mayr	Vice President of IG Metall; 1983–1986	Succeeded by Karl-Heinz Jansen
Preceded by Hans Mayr	President of IG Metall; 1986–1993	Succeeded by Klaus Zwickel
Preceded by Hans Mayr	President of the International Metalworkers' Federation; 1987–1993	Succeeded by Klaus Zwickel
