= International Metalworkers' Federation =

Former global union federation (1893–2012)

IMF
- International Metalworkers' Federation
- Merged into: IndustriALL Global Union
- Founded: August 1893
- Dissolved: 2012
- Headquarters: Geneva, Switzerland
- Location: International
- Members: 25 million (2009)
- Key people: Jyrki Raina, General Secretary; Berthold Huber, President
- Affiliations: International Confederation of Free Trade Unions
- Website: www.imfmetal.org

The International Metalworkers' Federation (IMF) was a global union federation of metalworkers' trade unions, founded in Zürich, Switzerland, in August 1893. As of 2009, the IMF had more than 200 member organisations in 100 countries, representing a combined membership of 25 million workers.

== History ==
The federation was founded as the International Metallurgists' Bureau of Information. In 1904, the International Secretariat of Foundry Workers merged into the federation, which renamed itself as the "International Metalworkers' Federation". From 1921, its constitution called for not only international co-operation to improve wages and conditions, but also for workers to take over the means of production.

Membership of the federation reached 1.9 million in 1930, but fell to only 190,000 in 1938, hit by the international depression. By 1947, membership had reached a new high of 2.7 million, and the federation took a leading role in opposing the World Federation of Trade Unions, instead becoming a founding constituent of the International Confederation of Free Trade Unions.

The organization held a congress every four years, consisting of delegates from the member organisations. The congress established the broad lines of the IMF's policies and actions and elected the President and General Secretary of the IMF. Some member unions wished for the federation to hold sectoral conferences, and the IMF's refusal to do so led six unions to found the International Federation of Foundry Workers in 1949, but this was dissolved in 1954.

The international headquarters of IMF was based in Geneva, Switzerland. There were regional offices in Johannesburg, New Delhi, Kuala Lumpur, Santiago, Mexico City, and a project office in Russia.

In June 2012, the IMF merged into the new global federation IndustriALL Global Union.

== Affiliates ==
The following unions were affiliated in 2009:

| Union | Abbreviation | Country | Affiliated membership (2008) |
|---|---|---|---|
| All Russia Defence Industry Workers' Union | ARDIWU | Russia | 25,000 |
| Atlas Copco Employees' Federation | | India | |
| Australian Manufacturing Workers' Union | AMWU | Australia | 80,000 |
| Australian Workers' Union | AWU | Australia | |
| Automobile and Agricultural Machinery Workers' Union of Ukraine | AAMWU | Ukraine | 15,000 (Note: Figure is for 2007.) |
| Autonomous Metalworkers' Union of Serbia | AMUS | Serbia | |
| Bangladesh Metalworkers' Federation | BMF | Bangladesh | |
| Bangladesh Metalworkers' League | BML | Bangladesh | |
| Christian Union of Belgian Metalworkers | CCMB | Belgium | 110,000 |
| CO-Industry | CO-industri | Denmark | 184,797 |
| Committee of Metal Industry Unions | CMIU | Hong Kong | 5,011 |
| Cyprus Industrial Workers' Federation | OVIEK-SEK | Cyprus | 4,000 |
| Electrical Industries Workers' Union | | Malaysia | |
| Engineering Workers' Union of Russia | EWU | Russia | 21,969 |
| Federation of Hungarian Metal Workers' Unions | VASAS | Hungary | 27,472 |
| Federation of Indonesia Metal Workers' Unions | FSPMI | Indonesia | 125,376 |
| Federation of Metal | ELA-STV | Spain | 31,633 |
| Federation of Metal, Construction and Related Trades | MCA-UGT | Spain | |
| Federation of Metallurgy CFE-CGC | | France | 28,472 |
| Federation of Metal-Mechanical Workers | FLM | Italy | 260,000 |
| Federation of Mineral and Metallurgical Workers' Commissions | FM/CC.OO. | Spain | 85,000 |
| FO Metals | FO Metaux | France | |
| General Federation of Mines and Metallurgy | FGMM | France | 80,000 |
| IF Metall | IF Metall | Sweden | 254,648 |
| IG Metall | IG Metall | Germany | 1,497,637 |
| Industrial and Commercial Workers' Union | ICU | Ghana | 2,698 |
| International Association of Machinists and Aerospace Workers | IAM-Canada | Canada | 37,275 |
| International Association of Machinists and Aerospace Workers | IAM | United States | |
| Japan Council of Metalworkers' Trade Unions | IMF-JC | Japan | 2,008,651 |
| Jathika Sewaka Sangamaya Metalworkers' Federation | JSSMF | Sri Lanka | 5,600 |
| Kovinska Union in the Slovenian Electrical Industry | SKEI | Slovenia | 35,409 |
| Metalicy | Metalicy | Bulgaria | 8,000 |
| Metal Industries Employees' Union | | Malaysia | |
| Metal-Textile-Food Union | GMTN | Austria | 180,000 |
| Metalworkers' Federation | FTM | France | 40,000 |
| Metal Workers' Federation in the Czech Republic | OSKOVO | Czechia | 124,009 |
| Metalworkers' Federation in the Slovak Republic | OZKOVO | Slovakia | 43,215 |
| Metal Workers' Trade Union of Croatia | | Croatia | 22,064 |
| Metalworkers' Union | Metalli | Finland | 165,000 |
| Miners' and Metallurgical Workers' Union of Russia | MMWU | Russia | 730,165 |
| National Automobile, Aerospace, Transportation and General Workers' Union of Canada | CAW-Canada | Canada | |
| National Federation of Metalworkers | CNM/CUT | Brazil | |
| National Federation of Mining and Metallurgical Workers | FENATRAMIM | Dominican Republic | |
| National Federation of Mining and Metallurgical Workers of Honduras | FETRAMIMH | Honduras | 950 |
| National Federation of Workers in Metal, Energy and Chemical Industries in Angola | FSIMEQ | Angola | 7,911 |
| National Federation of Workers in Metal and Mechanical Industries | FENASIMECAM | Cameroon | 2,000 |
| National Union of Metalworkers of South Africa | NUMSA | South Africa | |
| National Union of Mine and Metal Workers of the Mexican Republic | SITIMM | Mexico | |
| National Union of Transport, Equipment and Allied Industries' Workers | | Malaysia | |
| Nepal Factory Labour Congress | NFLC | Nepal | 7,250 |
| Panhellenic Metalworkers' Federation | PMF | Greece | 12,451 |
| Philips & BC Components Employees' Union | | India | |
| Radio, Electronics and Mechanical Engineering Workers' Trade Union of Ukraine | REMEWU | Ukraine | 5,111 |
| Sandvik Asia Employees' Union | | India | |
| SKF Bearing India Employees' Union | | India | |
| Steel, Metal and Engineering Workers' Federation of India | | India | |
| Swedish Association of Graduate Engineers | | Sweden | 22,000 |
| Trade Union of Aircraft Builders of Ukraine | TUAB | Ukraine | 63,491 |
| Trade Union of Industry, Energy and Mining of Macedonia | SIER | North Macedonia | |
| Trade Union of Metalworkers | TUM | Bosnia-Herzegovina | 12,747 |
| Trade Union of Workers of the Radio & Electronics Industry, Automobile Machinery, Metalworking Industry and Other Branches of the National Economy | REPAM | Belarus | 1,612 |
| Unia | Unia | Switzerland | 57,000 |
| Unionen | Unionen | Sweden | 121,000 |
| Union of Metallurgical and Related Workers | SIMA | Portugal | |
| Union of Salaried Employees | TU | Finland | 22,828 |
| Union of the Belgian Metal Industry | CMB | Belgium | 55,000 |
| United Auto Workers | UAW | United States | |
| United Federation of Trade Unions | Fellesforbundet | Norway | 45,787 |
| United Steelworkers | USW | Canada | |
| United Steelworkers | USW | United States | |

== Leadership ==
=== General Secretaries ===
1893: Hermann Vogelsanger
1896: Charles Hobson
1904: Alexander Schlicke
1920: Konrad Ilg
1954: Adolphe Graedel
1971: Ivar Noren
1974: Herman Rebhan
1989: Marcello Malentacchi
2009: Jyrki Raina

=== Presidents ===
1960: Otto Brenner
1972: Hans Rasmussen
1974: Eugen Loderer
1984: Hans Mayr
1987: Franz Steinkühler
1993: Klaus Zwickel
2003: Jürgen Peters
2009: Berthold Huber
