= Walter Riester =

German trade unionist and politician

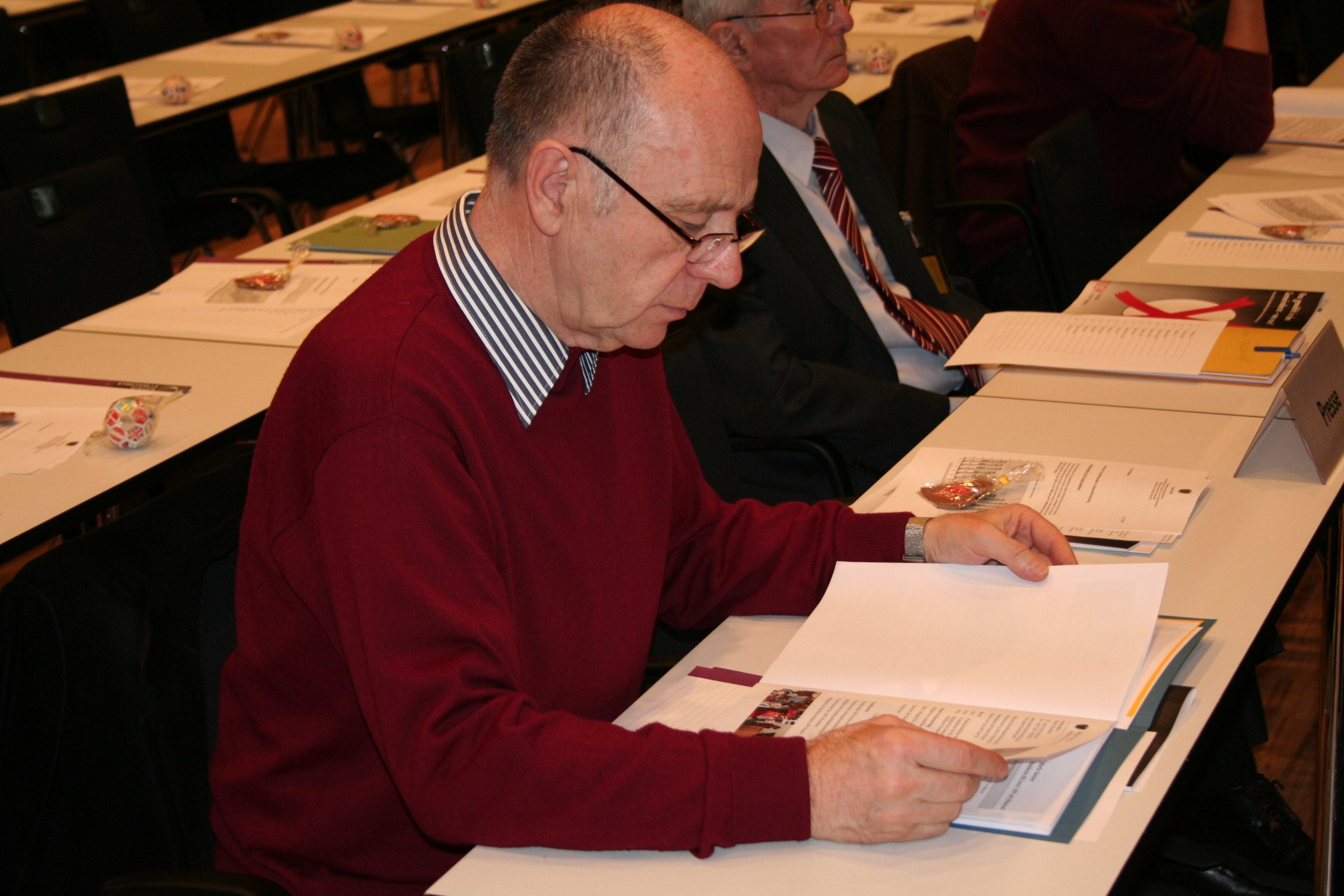
Walter Riester in 2009

Walter Riester (born 27 September 1943 in Kaufbeuren) is a German politician of the SPD and former Minister of Labour and Social Affairs.

== Political career ==
Riester joined the SPD in 1966. From 1993 to 1998 he was deputy chairman of the IG Metall.

From 1998 until 2005, Riester was a member of the SPD's federal executive board, under the leadership of successive chairmen Gerhard Schröder and Franz Müntefering.

From 1998 to 2002 Riester was Minister of Labour and Social Affairs in the cabinet of Chancellor Gerhard Schröder. The ministry was dissolved after the 2002 elections, so Riester was withdrawn from the cabinet, although there had been no change of government. His name is best known for the so-called Riester-Rente, a grant-aided privately funded pension scheme, which was created during his term of office.

From 2002 until 2009, Riester was a member of the German Bundestag, where he served on the Committee on Economic Cooperation and Development. In addition to his committee assignments, he was a member of the German delegation to the Parliamentary Assembly of the Council of Europe.

== Other activities ==
- Union Investment, Member of the Supervisory Board (2009-2012)
- Hans Böckler Prize of the City of Cologne, Member of the Advisory Board

Trade union offices
Preceded by Klaus Zwickel	Vice President of IG Metall; 1993–1998	Succeeded by Jürgen Peters
