= Fred Kormis =

German sculptor (1894-1986)

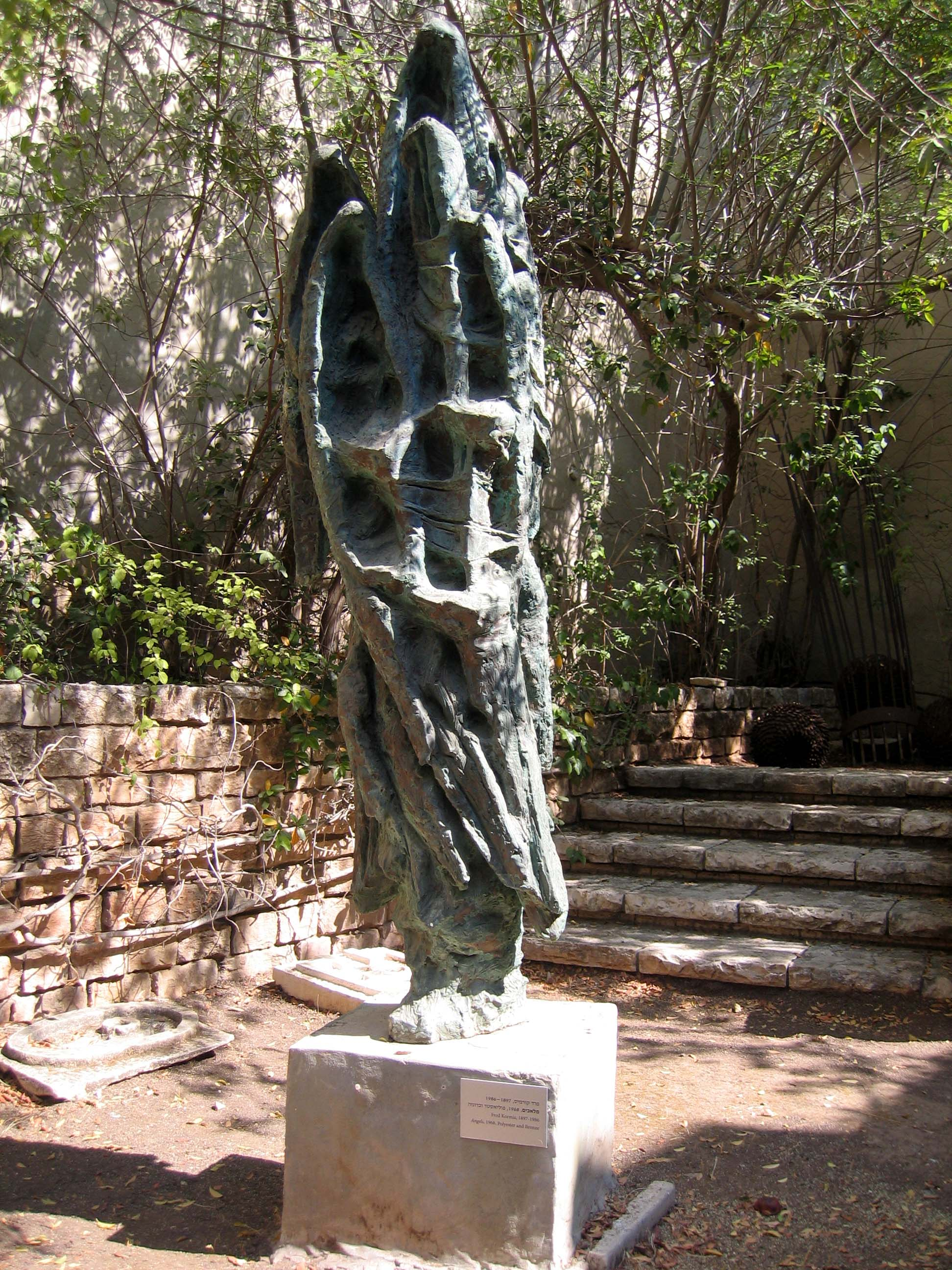
Angels (1968), Museum of Art, Ein Harod (Meuhad)

Fred Kormis (September 20, 1894 – May 12, 1986) was a German sculptor. Kormis gained recognition for his bronze portrait medallions. Amongst a total of 41 pieces exhibited at Royal Academy the subjects included Edward VIII, Winston Churchill and Charlie Chaplin. Examples of his medallions are to be found in the National Portrait Gallery, the British Museum and the Royal Collection.

He married Rachel Sender, sister of Tony Sender.

He was keen to make a memorial to prisoners of war including victims of the concentration camps. Thanks to a family bequest he was able to start work on the five figures. His friend Reg Freeson, then leader of Brent Council, helped him find a home for them in Gladstone Park, London. Eventually the five figures were unveiled on May 11, 1969.

He created England's first memorial to Holocaust victims.

In 2024-25 much of Kormis' artwork was displayed at an exhibition at London’s Wiener Holocaust Library. His document collection, donated to the Library after his death, has been digitised and can be viewed via the Library's online archive.
