= Alexander Schlicke =

German politician and trade unionist

Alexander Schlicke (26 March 1863 – 6 February 1940) was a German politician and trade unionist.

Born in Berlin, Schlicke trained in precision mechanics at a craft school, and then found work in the industry, moving across the country until he ended up in Frankfurt. There, he joined the local union of metalworkers, becoming a shop steward in 1890. That year, he also joined the Social Democratic Association of Frankfurt, and in 1891, he became its chair.

In 1891, the local metal workers' union became part of the new German Metal Workers' Union (DMV), the largest union in the country, and Schlicke was appointed as its full-time general secretary. In 1895, he was elected as the union's president, and in both roles, he worked to centralise the union, expand its membership, and reach collective agreements with employers. In 1905, he was additionally elected as general secretary of the International Metalworkers' Federation, which moved its office to Stuttgart, where he was working.

Schlicke was criticised for opposing industrial action during World War I, and stood down as president of the DMV in 1919. He won election to the Weimar National Assembly, representing the German Social Democratic Party, and then in 1920 was elected to the Reichstag. He was Minister of Labour in the Württemberg State Government from January to June 1919, and then in the national government from June 1919 until June 1920, focusing on re-integrating soldiers into the workforce. During this period, the Works Council Act was passed, leading to left-wing demonstrations which were forcibly suppressed.

Early in 1921, Schlicke was appointed as the full-time director of the Berlin office of the International Labour Organization. He retired in 1925, although he served in Parliament until 1930. He died in Stuttgart in 1940.

Political offices
Preceded by Gustav Bauer	Minister of Labour; 1919–1920	Succeeded by Heinrich Brauns
Trade union offices
Preceded by August Junge	President of the German Metal Workers' Union; 1895–1919	Succeeded by Alwin Brandes, Robert Dißmann and Georg Reichel
Preceded by Charles Hobson	General Secretary of the International Metalworkers' Federation; 1905–1920	Succeeded by Konrad Ilg
