= Jürgen Peters =

German former trade union leader (born 1944)

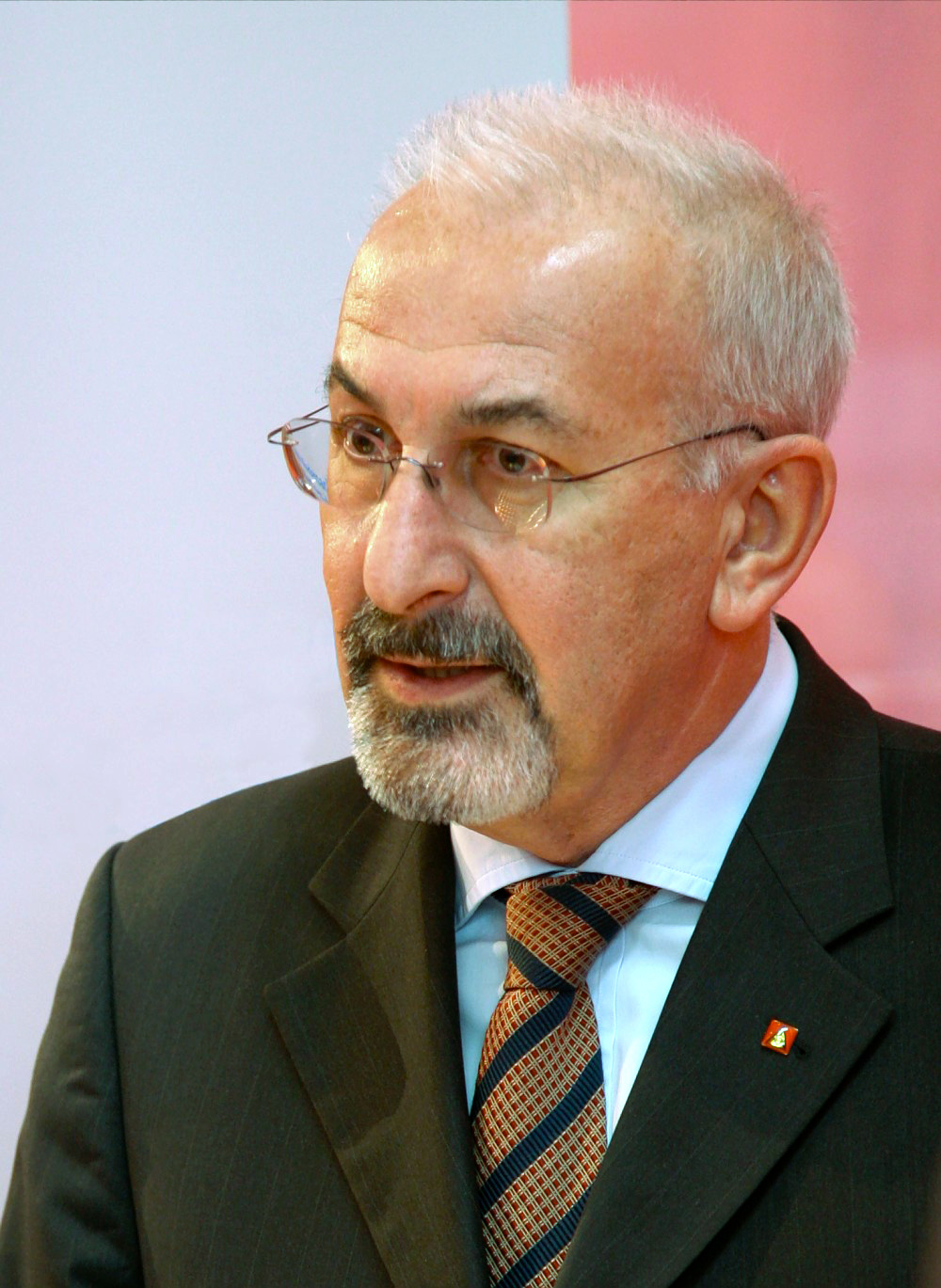
Jürgen Peters

Jürgen Peters (born 17 March 1944) is a German former trade union leader.

Born in what is now Opole in Poland, Peters trained as a machinist, and then found work at Hanomag, in Hanover. In 1961, he joined the trade union IG Metall. He studied at the Labour Academy in Frankfurt, then became a teacher at one of IG Metall's training centres. In 1976, he moved to work for the union in Düsseldorf, and in 1988, he became the head of its Hanover region. In 1993, he negotiated a deal at Volkswagen, where workers cut back to a four-day week in exchange for an end to redundancies.

In 1998, Peters was elected as vice president of IG Metall, with responsibility for collective bargaining, despite the opposition of union leader Klaus Zwickel. He became the most prominent figure on the union's left wing, strongly opposing Agenda 2010, and supporting a major but unsuccessful strike in 2003. Peters argued that the strike had failed due to Zwickel's poor strategy. Zwickel resigned, and Peters was elected as his replacement. He also replaced Zwickel as president of the International Metalworkers' Federation. He served in both posts until his retirement, in 2007.

Trade union offices
Preceded by Walter Riester	Vice President of IG Metall; 1998–2003	Succeeded by Berthold Huber
Preceded by Klaus Zwickel	President of IG Metall; 2003–2007	Succeeded by Berthold Huber
Preceded by Klaus Zwickel	President of the International Metalworkers' Federation; 2003–2009	Succeeded by Berthold Huber
