= Wood and Plastic Union =

The Wood and Plastic Union (German: Gewerkschaft Holz und Kunststoff, GHK) was a West German trade union representing workers in wood and plastic manufacturing.

The union was founded in 1949 and affiliated to the German Trade Union Confederation. While it represented plastic workers from the start, 90% of its membership was in wood manufacturing. By 1998, it had a membership of 145,128. In 2000, it merged into IG Metall.

== Presidents ==
1949: Markus Schleicher
1951: Franz Valentiner
1953: Heinz Seeger
1958: Gerhard Vater
1977: Kurt Georgi
1981: Horst Morich
1993: Gisbert Schlemmer
