= Berthold Huber =

German trade union leader (born 1950)

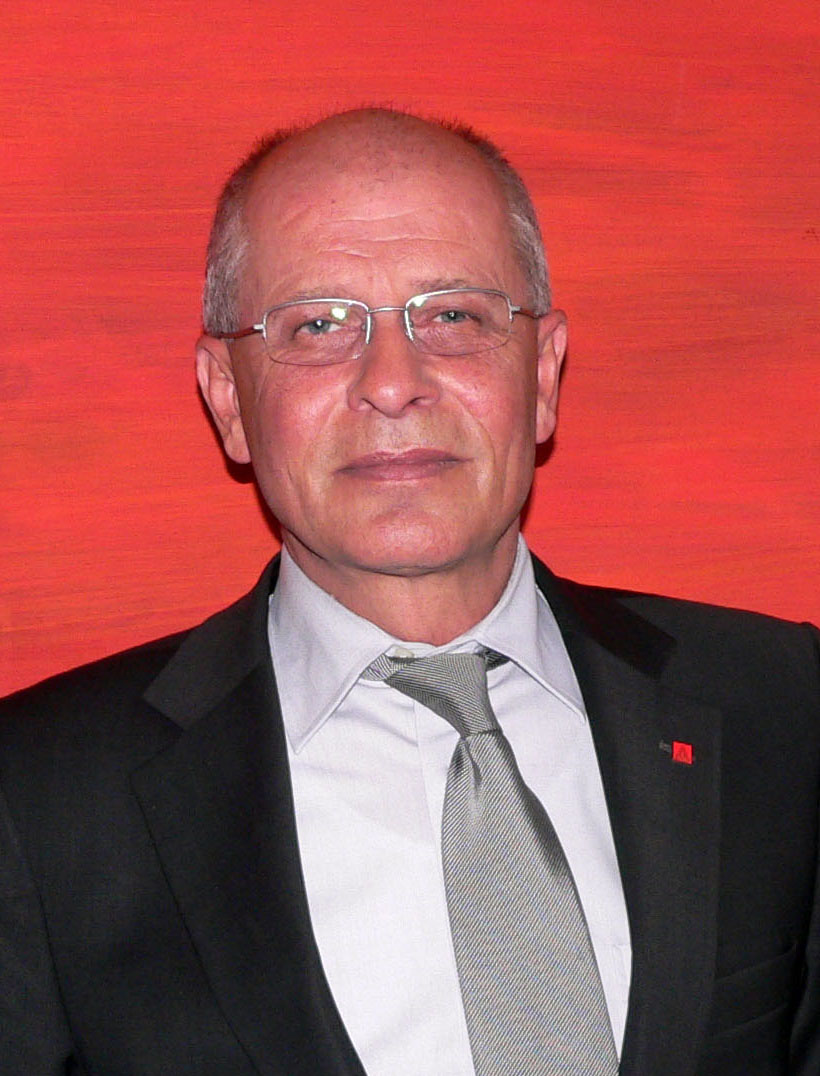
- Huber in 2009

President of the IndustriALL Global Union
- In office 2012–2016
- Preceded by: position established
- Succeeded by: Jörg Hofmann

President of IG Metall
- In office 2007–2013
- Preceded by: Jürgen Peters
- Succeeded by: Detlef Wetzel

President of the International Metalworkers' Federation
- In office 2009–2012
- Preceded by: Jürgen Peters
- Succeeded by: position abolished

Personal details
- Born: February 15, 1950 (age 75); Ulm, West Germany
- Political party: Social Democratic Party of Germany (1991–); Communist Workers’ League of Germany (–1979)

Berthold Huber (born 15 February 1950) is a German former trade union leader.

Born on 15 February 1950 in Ulm, Huber was apprenticed as a toolmaker, and worked at Kässbohrer. He joined IG Metall, and in 1978 he became head of the Kässbohrer works council in part to his association with the predecessor organization to the Marxist–Leninist Party of Germany, the Communist Workers Union of Germany. In the mid-1980s, he studied philosophy, politics, and history at Frankfurt University, but left without completing his degree. He began working full-time for the union in 1990, and in 1991 became director of its president's office. In 1998, he became the director of its Baden-Wuerttemberg region, and was elected as the union's vice president in 2003. He became president of the union in 2007, and was also elected as president of the International Metalworkers' Federation, then moving to its successor, the IndustriALL Global Union.

In 2012, Huber retired from IG Metall, becoming deputy chair of the board of Volkswagen. In 2015, he served as acting chair, in which post he dealt with the fallout from the Volkswagen emissions scandal. He served on the board of Audi for nearly twenty years, retiring in 2018. He also serves on the boards of the Max Planck Society and the Academy of Science and Engineering, and chair of the council of the Siemens Foundation.

Huber has been married twice and has three children: one from his first marriage and two from his second.

Trade union offices
Preceded by Jürgen Peters	Vice President of IG Metall; 2003–2007	Succeeded by Detlef Wetzel
Preceded by Jürgen Peters	President of IG Metall; 2007–2013	Succeeded by Detlef Wetzel
Preceded by Jürgen Peters	President of the International Metalworkers' Federation; 2009–2012	Succeeded by Federation merged
Preceded by New position	President of the IndustriALL Global Union; 2012–2016	Succeeded by Jörg Hofmann
