= Hans Mayr (trade unionist) =

German trades unionist and politician

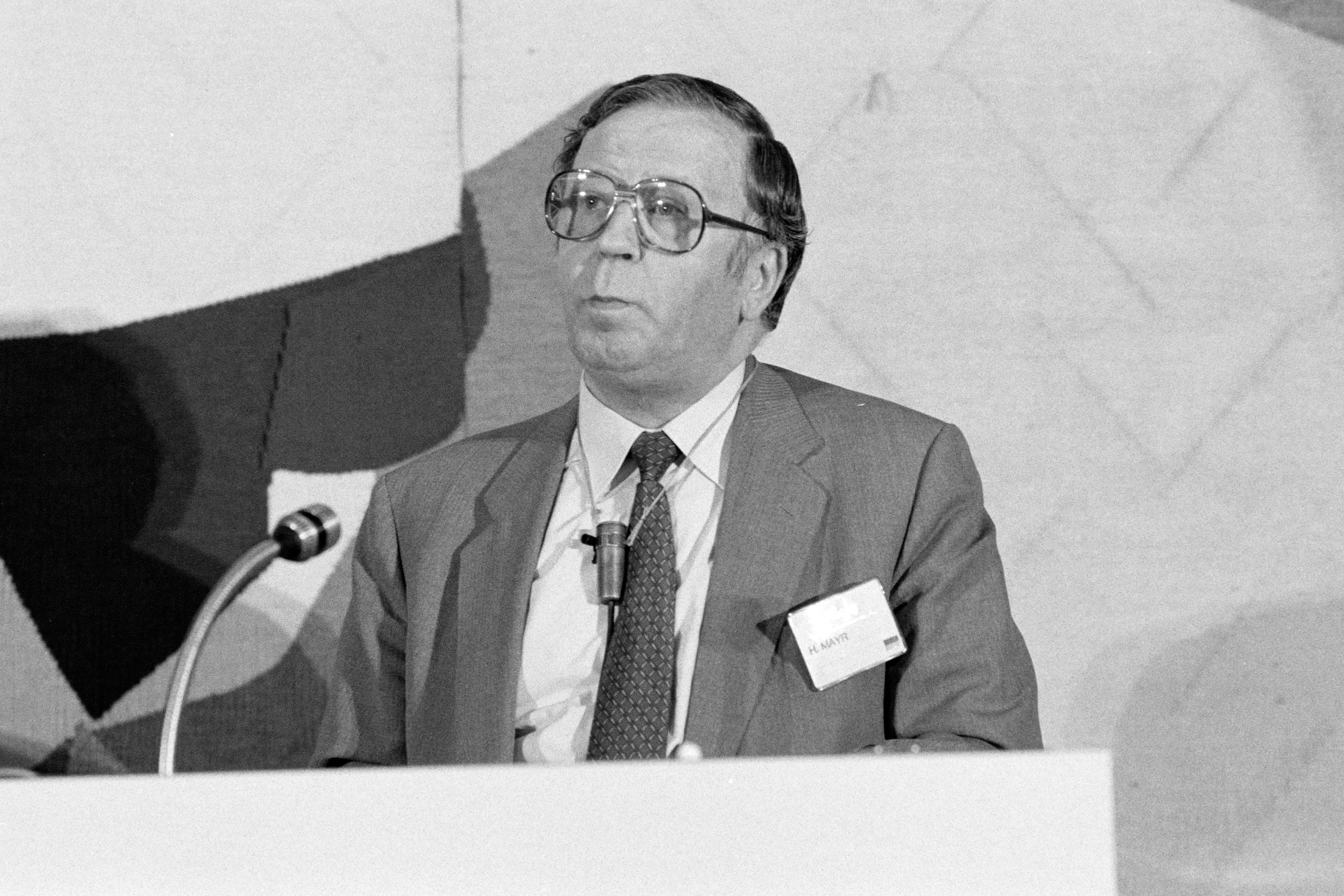
- Mayr in 1983
- Born: 13 December 1921; Freudenegg, Bavaria, Germany
- Died: 3 August 2009 (aged 87); Dreieich, Hesse, Germany
- Occupations: Trades Union Officer; Politician; President of IG Metall (union)
- Political party: SPD

Hans Mayr (13 December 1921 – 3 August 2009) was a German trades unionist and politician (SPD). Respected for his negotiating flair, he served between 1983 and 1986 as president of West Germany's IG Metall (union).

== Life ==
Hans Meyer was born in Freudenegg, a village located in western Bavaria, a short distance to the southeast of Ulm. He grew up in a "classic" Social Democratic family in which both discipline and tolerance were valued and political discussion was part of family life. His father was a metal worker and works council member who studied after the First World War and in 1946, after the Second World War, became a judge. Meyer was not quite twelve in 1933 when the Nazis took power, and he was a witness to government reprisals against his father who was not sympathetic to the unfolding Nazi dictatorship. His experiences from that time also included the support his mother received from a local Jewish business which gave her a job after her husband's arrest, enabling the family to survive. Towards the end of the Second World War he was sent to the front line as a soldier, becoming briefly a prisoner of war. He escaped, and in 1946 joined IG Metall and the Social Democratic Party ("Sozialdemokratische Partei Deutschlands" / SPD).

He soon became a full-time union official, initially as a lead officer with the union branch in Göppingen. In 1962 he was elected to the union executive. From 1963 his principal responsibilities involved wages strategy. He became known as the union's best tactician. In 1972 he was elected deputy vice-chair of IG Metall, and then in 1981 as vice-chair in succession to Eugen Loderer on the latter's election to presidency of the union. Hans Meyer became union president in 1983, a position from which he retired three years later on reaching retirement age.

His most high-profile achievement came in the middle 1980s. The forty hour working week and the removal of Saturday morning from the standard working week had been a long-standing union aspiration since early in the twentieth century, and it had been secured in the 1960s. Twenty years later the industries in which IG Metall was present, notably the automobile manufacturing sector, had seen massive growth and, for the most part, massive profitability. However, growth faltered in the wake of the 1973 oil crisis, and during the second half of the 1970s unemployment was on a sustained upward trend. In order, it was explained, that the available work might be shared out more fairly, the union now proposed a further reduction in the working week, this time to 35 hours. A lengthy and at times confrontational negotiation followed, culminating in a six-week strike after the summer break in 1984. Mayr choreographed the campaign which by the end of that year had been successful. During the next year he found himself campaigning strongly and, it was felt at the time, effectively against proposals by the centre-right Kohl government to place additional restrictions workers' right to strike. His campaign against the government proposal to change Paragraph 116 of the so-called "Employment Support Law" involved a further mass-mobilisation of more than one million workers.

In the 1960s Mayr embarked on a parallel career as a member of parliament. On 20 November 1961 he entered the regional parliament (Landtag) of Baden-Württemberg, taking the seat vacated through the resignation of Karl Riegel (who had been elected to the Bundestag (national parliament) in September 1961), and representing the "Göppingen I" electoral district. Mayr remained a member of the legislature till the next set of elections, which took place in 1964.

Trade union offices
Preceded by Eugen Loderer	Vice President of IG Metall; 1972–1983	Succeeded by Franz Steinkühler
Preceded by Eugen Loderer	President of IG Metall; 1983–1986	Succeeded by Franz Steinkühler
Preceded by Eugen Loderer	President of the International Metalworkers' Federation; 1984–1987	Succeeded by Franz Steinkühler
