= Hans Rasmussen (trade unionist) =

Hans Rasmussen (14 December 1902 – 1 January 1996) was a Danish trade union leader and politician.

Born in Odense, Rasmussen became a machine operator, and joined the Danish Blacksmith and Machine Workers' Association, becoming its general secretary in 1935. In 1944, he became the union's president, the top role in the union. In this role, he became known for his negotiation skills and campaigning for full employment, gaining the nickname of the "Strong Blacksmith".

Rasmussen joined the Social Democratic Party of Denmark, and was elected to Parliament in 1950. In 1961, he became the party's deputy chair, and when Prime Minister Viggo Kampmann resigned in 1962, he was considered as a possible successor. He was instead offered the posts of finance or commerce minister, but rejected them. Despite this, he was one of the leading architects of the party's new economic policy.

Rasmussen left Parliament in 1964, and his party role in 1969. In 1972, he retired as president of the union, but was elected as President of the International Metalworkers' Federation, serving for two years. Also in 1972, he campaigned against Danish membership of the European Community. From 1975 to 1978, he served as deputy mayor of Birkerød.

Trade union offices
Preceded by Peter Anders Andersen	President of the Danish Blacksmith and Machine Workers' Association; 1944–1972	Succeeded by Paulus Andersen
Preceded by Otto Brenner	President of the International Metalworkers' Federation; 1972–1974	Succeeded by Eugen Loderer
