= Walter Freitag (politician) =

German politician (1889–1958)

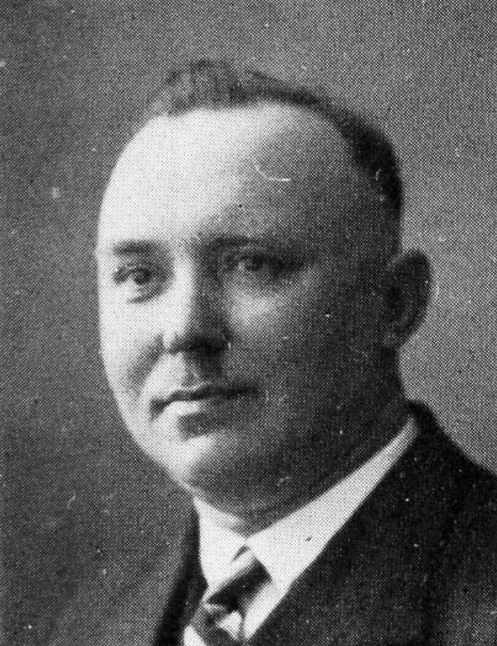
- Freitag c. 1932

Deputy of the Bundestag
- In office 7 September 1949 – 7 September 1953

Deputy of the Landtag of North Rhine-Westphalia
- In office 20 April 1947 – 18 June 1950

Deputy of the Landtag of Prussia
- In office 24 April 1932 – 14 October 1933

Personal details
- Born: 14 August 1889 Remscheid, Rhine Province, Kingdom of Prussia, German Empire
- Died: 7 June 1958 (aged 68) Herdecke, North Rhine-Westphalia, West Germany
- Party: SPD
- Other political affiliations: Independent Social Democratic Party of Germany
- Occupation: Trade union leader

Military service
- Allegiance: German Empire
- Branch/service: Imperial German Army
- Years of service: 1914–1918
- Battles/wars: World War I

Walter Freitag (14 August 1889 – 7 June 1958) was a German trade union leader and politician of the Social Democratic Party (SPD). He served in the Landtag of Prussia from 1932 to 1933 until ousted after the Nazi seizure of power. Imprisoned until 1935, he was kept under police surveillance and remained largely unemployed throughout the Nazi period.After the end of the Second World War, he resumed a political career and served in the Landtag of North Rhine-Westphalia from 1947 to 1950 and in the German Bundestag from 1949 to 1953. He also resumed his leadership in the German labor movement, serving as the chairman of the German Trade Union Confederation between 1952 and 1956.

== Early life ==
Walter Freitag was born in Remscheid, the son of a locksmith, and trained as a toolmaker. In 1907, he became a union member and in 1908, a member of the Social Democratic Party of Germany (SPD). He fought with the German Imperial Army in the First World War from 1914 to 1918. Influenced by his front-line experiences, Freitag joined the more radical Independent Social Democratic Party of Germany (USPD) in 1917 and was a member of the Remscheid Workers' and Soldiers' Council in 1918.

== German revolution and the Weimar Republic ==
After the November Revolution, he became a trade union secretary in Remscheid and, from 1920, district leader of the German Metalworkers' Association in Hagen. He belonged to the faction of the USPD that rejected a merger with the Communist Party of Germany (KPD) and he rejoined the SPD in 1922. In 1931, he was elected SPD chairman of the Hagen-Schwelm district. At the 1932 Prussian state election, he was elected as an SPD deputy to the Landtag of Prussia, serving until that body was dissolved by the Nazis in October 1933.

== Persecution under Nazi Germany ==
At the beginning of the Nazi dictatorship, Freitag organized a meeting of SPD officials in April 1933, which was violently broken up by the Sturmabteilung, the Nazi paramilitary stormtroopers. After the dissolution of the trade unions in May, he was forced to continue working for the German Labor Front. In August 1933, Freitag insisted on being released and was subsequently incarcerated at the Neusustrum concentration camp near Papenburg, later being transferred to the Lichtenburg concentration camp. In 1935, Freitag was released but remained under police surveillance. Apart from a few odd jobs, Freitag remained unemployed until 1942. He then found employment as a doorman, a security guard and a fireman at the Hörde plant of the Hörder Bergwerks- und Hütten-Verein (Hörde Mining and Metallurgy Association).

== Post-war life ==
After the end of the war, Freitag returned to politics, playing a key role in rebuilding the Social Democratic Party organization in the Ruhr region, especially in Herdecke. Freitag was the Landrat (district administrator) of the Ennepe-Ruhr district from 1946 to 1949 and a member of the Landtag of North Rhine-Westphalia from 1946 to 1950. From 1949 to 1953 he was a member of the first German Bundestag. He was directly elected in the Ennepe-Ruhr-Kreis II Bundestag election district.

Freitag also returned to the trade union movement, becoming one of the co-founders of the metalworkers' union (IG Metall), and serving as union chairman of the Siegerland region in 1946. From 1949, he was national co-chairman of IG Metall in the German Trade Union Confederation (DGB) and was re-elected to this position in 1952. In October 1952, Freitag became the chairman of the DGB, serving until his resignation in June 1956. From November 1955 to June 1958, he was a member of the administrative board of the German Federal Railway. He died on 7 June 1958, from the effects of a stroke. Chancellor Konrad Adenauer attended his funeral.

== Sources ==
- Herbst, Ludolf; Jahn, Bruno (2002). Vierhaus, Rudolf (ed.). Biographisches Handbuch der Mitglieder des Deutschen Bundestages. 1949–2002 [Biographical Handbook of the Members of the German Bundestag. 1949–2002] (in German). München: De Gruyter - De Gruyter Saur. p. 1715. ISBN 978-3-11-184511-1.
- Walter Freitag biography in the Landtag of North Rhine-Westphalia website
