= Christiane Benner =

German sociologist and trade Union Official

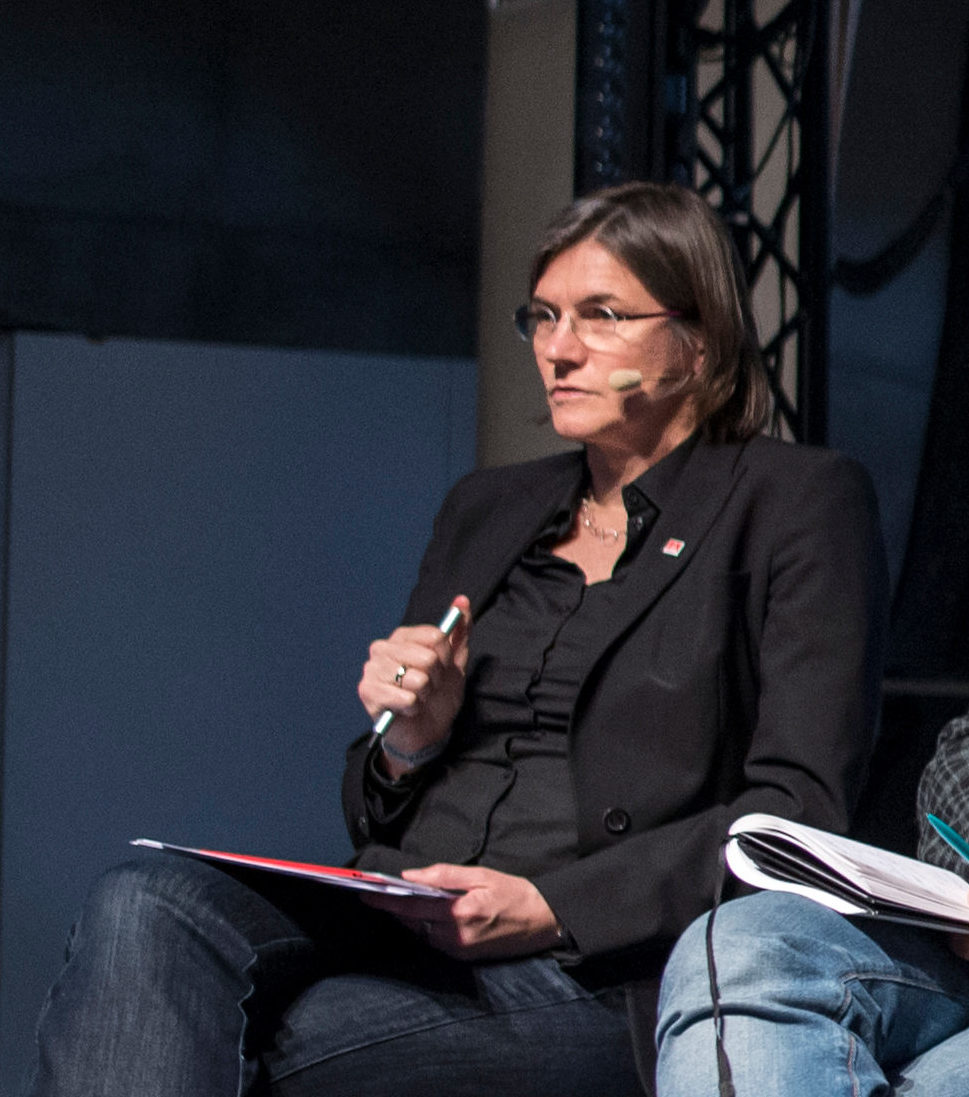
- Benner in 2016
- Born: Aachen, West Germany
- Education: University of Marburg; University of Chicago (BA); Goethe University Frankfurt (Diplom)
- Occupations: Sociologist, trade union official

Christiane Benner (born 9 February 1968 in Aachen) is a German sociologist and trade union official. In 2023, she became the first woman to hold the post of First Chairwoman of Europe's largest industrial union, IG Metall (the German metalworkers union). After being elected to the union leadership in 2015, she is the first woman to do so in the union's 125-year history.

== Early life and education ==
Benner was born in the West German town of Aachen and raised by a single mother. After completing her secondary education in Bensheim in 1987, she trained as a foreign language secretary at Carl Schenck AG (part of the Dürr Group since 2000), where she remained until 1993.

Benner then studied sociology at University of Marburg and at the University of Chicago in North Manchester, Indiana, earning a Bachelor of Arts degree. She completed her studies at the University of Frankfurt with a diploma. Her studies were financially supported by the Hans Böckler Foundation (trade union affiliated foundation).

== Career ==
Having worked for IG Metall in various functions since 1997, Benner was elected as its vice chair on 20 October 2015, with 91.9 percent of the vote; she worked with the trade union's first chairman Jörg Hofmann. In this capacity, she became the first woman to lead the world's largest stand-alone trade union after 125 years of its existence. The Tagesspiegel reported on her election under the headline "IG Metall dares the revolution".

In 2022, Benner was appointed by Minister of Digital Affairs and Transport Volker Wissing to the German government's advisory board on its digitization strategy.

On 23 October 2023 Benner was elected First Chairwoman of IG Metall.

== Other activities ==
=== Corporate boards ===
- Volkswagen, Member of the supervisory board (since 2025)
- Continental, Member of the supervisory board (since 2018)
- BMW, Member of the supervisory board (2014–2024)
- Bosch, Member of the supervisory board (2013–2017)

=== Non-profit organizations ===
- Cradle to Cradle, Member of the Advisory Board

== Personal ==
Benner is married and a member of the Social Democratic Party of Germany.

== Public positions ==
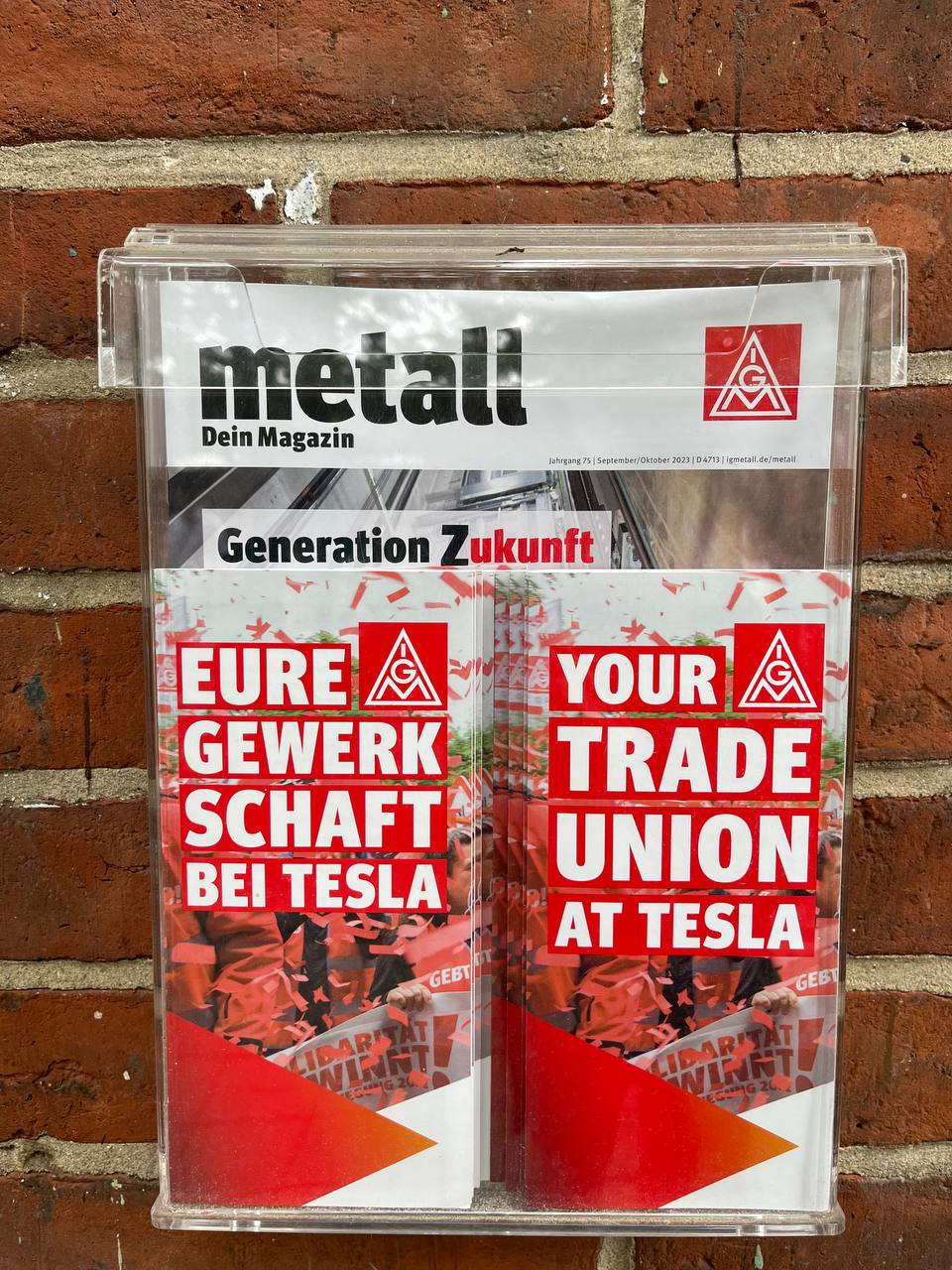
Benners trade Union presents brochures for Tesla Workers

Benner warned Elon Musk not to avoid unionisation of Tesla company.

Benner views the far right wing party AFD as a risk for the German economy.

Trade union offices
Preceded by Jörg Hofmann	Vice President of IG Metall; 2015–2023	Succeeded by Jürgen Kerner
Preceded by Jörg Hofmann	President of IG Metall; 2023–present	Succeeded by Incumbent
