= Robert Dißmann =

German trade unionist and politician

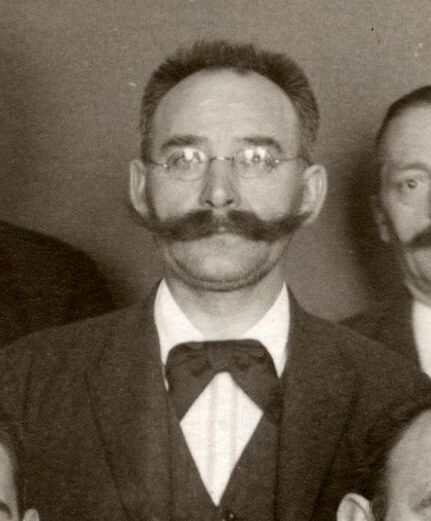
Robert Dißmann in 1921

Robert Dißmann (8 August 1878 – 30 October 1926) was a German trade unionist and politician.

Born in Hülsenbusch (now part of Gummersbach) in the Prussian Rhine Province, Dißmann became a machinist and joined the German Metal Workers' Union (DMV) and the Social Democratic Party of Germany (SPD). In 1900, he began working on a full-time basis for the union in Barmen. He later moved to Frankfurt.

In 1908, he became a full-time local party secretary for the Social Democratic Party in Hanau. He then became district secretary in Frankfurt. He stood for the party's national executive in 1913 and was narrowly defeated.

Dißmann opposed World War I. In 1917, he left the SPD and joined the new Independent Social Democratic Party of Germany (USPD). In 1919, he was elected as joint president of the DMV, and in 1920, he was also elected to the Reichstag. He rejoined the SPD with the majority of the USPD in 1922, and remained prominent in its left-wing faction.

Trade union offices
Preceded by Alexander Schlicke	President of the German Metal Workers' Union; 1919–1921; With: Alwin Brandes and Georg Reichel	Succeeded by Alwin Brandes, Willy Eggert and Georg Reichel
