= REFA =

German business studies organization

Logo

REFA, the Association for Work Design, Business Organization and Business Development is Germany's oldest organization for work design, business organization and business development. It was founded in 1924 as the Reichsausschuß für Arbeitszeitermittlung (English: Reich Committee for Working Time Determination). During the Nazi era, it was known as the Reichsausschuß für Arbeitsstudien (English: Reich Committee for Labour Studies).
