= Klaus Zwickel =

German trade union leader

- Born: 31 May 1939 (age 87); Heilbronn, Germany
- Organizations: IG Metall; International Metalworkers' Federation

Klaus Zwickel (born 31 May 1939) is a German former trade union leader.

Born in Heilbronn, Zwickel completed an apprenticeship as a tool maker, and joined IG Metall in 1954. He worked in various local factories, serving as a shop steward from 1957, then chair of the works council from 1960. In 1959, he also joined the Social Democratic Party.

IG Metall was affiliated to the German Confederation of Trade Unions (DGB), and in 1965, Zwickel became organising secretary of its Neckarsulm branch. In 1968, he returned to IG Metall, to head up its Necarsulm branch, and then in 1984, he moved to the same role in its large Stuttgart branch.

Zwickel was elected to the union's executive in 1986, with responsibility for collective bargaining, then he became vice president of the union in 1989, and president in 1993. As leader of the union, he was known as a strong negotiator and expert on tariffs. He formed the unsuccessful Alliances for Work, and led unsuccessful strikes to make a 35-hour week universal. He also served on the executive of Mannesmann, and when the company was taken over by Vodafone, he abstained on a vote which granted high redundancy payments for executives, which proved controversial.

From 1993, Zwickel also served as president of the International Metalworkers' Federation. In 1995, Zwickel went out publicly against the proposed dumping of the Brent Spar, arguing for handling the structure onshore. He resigned from all his union posts in 2003, amid conflict between traditionalists and modernisers in IG Metall.

Trade union offices
Preceded by Karl-Heinz Jansen	Vice President of IG Metall; 1989–1993	Succeeded by Walter Riester
Preceded by Franz Steinkühler	President of IG Metall; 1993–2003	Succeeded by Jürgen Peters
Preceded by Franz Steinkühler	President of the International Metalworkers' Federation; 1993–2003	Succeeded by Jürgen Peters
