= Jörg Hofmann (trade unionist) =

German trade unionist

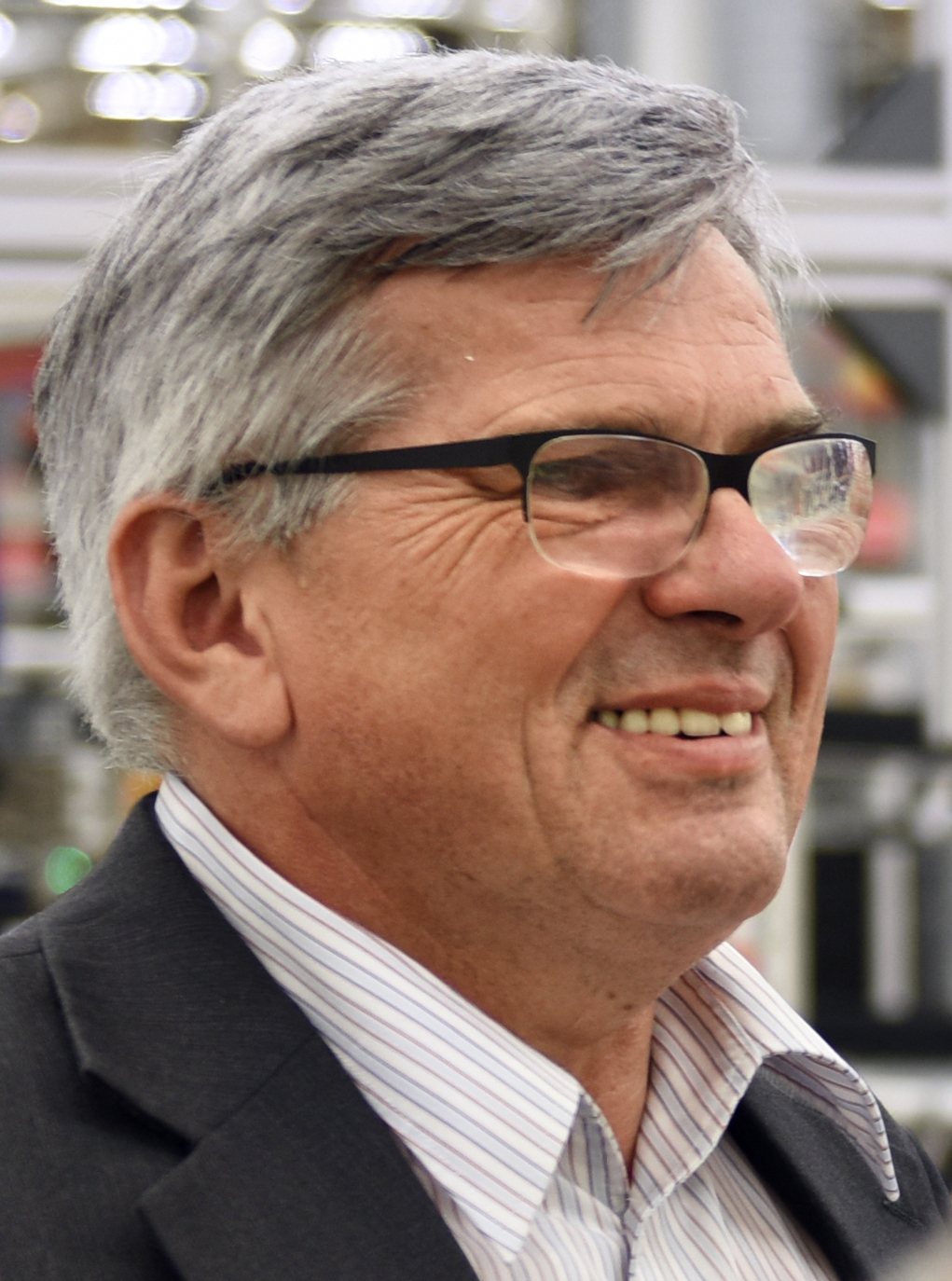
Hofmann in 2015

Jörg Hofmann (born 3 December 1955) is a German trade union leader.

Born in Oppelsbohm, Hofmann studied agriculture, then went to university to study economics. He found work as a researcher at the Institute for Industrial Management at the University of Hohenheim. In 1982, he moved to work for the trade union IG Metall as an expert on new technologies.

In 1987, Hofmann became secretary of IG Metall's Stuttgart office, also establishing a new office in Dresden after the fall of the Berlin Wall. In 1999, he became the union's director for Baden-Württemberg, then vice-president of the union in 2013, and president in 2015. The following year, he also became president of the IndustriALL Global Union. Under his leadership, IG Metall negotiated a major collective agreement for metal and electrical workers, giving them more rights to determine their working hours. Hofmann has also sat on various government committees on the future of work, globalisation, and digitalisation.

In 2019, Hofmann was re-elected as president of IG Metall with 71% of the vote, the second lowest vote share for any of the union's presidents. Reuters speculated that this was due to a defeat on collective bargaining in East Germany, and internal power struggles. In 2023, Hofmann was superseded by Christiane Benner, the first female president of IG Metall.

Trade union offices
Preceded by Detlef Wetzel	Vice President of IG Metall; 2013–2015	Succeeded by Christiane Benner
Preceded by Detlef Wetzel	President of IG Metall; 2015–2023	Succeeded by Christiane Benner
Preceded by Berthold Huber	President of the IndustriALL Global Union; 2016–2023	Succeeded by Marie Nilsson
