= German Metal Workers' Union =

German Reich trade union (1891–1933)

- Deutscher Metallarbeiter-Verband
- Successor: Industrial Union of Metal (E Germany), Industrial Union of Metal (W Germany)
- Founded: 6 June 1891
- Dissolved: 2 May 1933
- Headquarters: Rötestraße 16, Stuttgart
- Location: Germany
- Members: 1,632,670 (1920)
- Publication: Deutsche Metall-Arbeiter-Zeitung
- Affiliations: ADGB, IMF

The German Metal Workers' Union (German: Deutscher Metallarbeiter-Verband, abbreviated DMV) was a German industrial union for metalworkers formed in 1891 and dissolved after the Nazis' accession to power in 1933.

== History ==
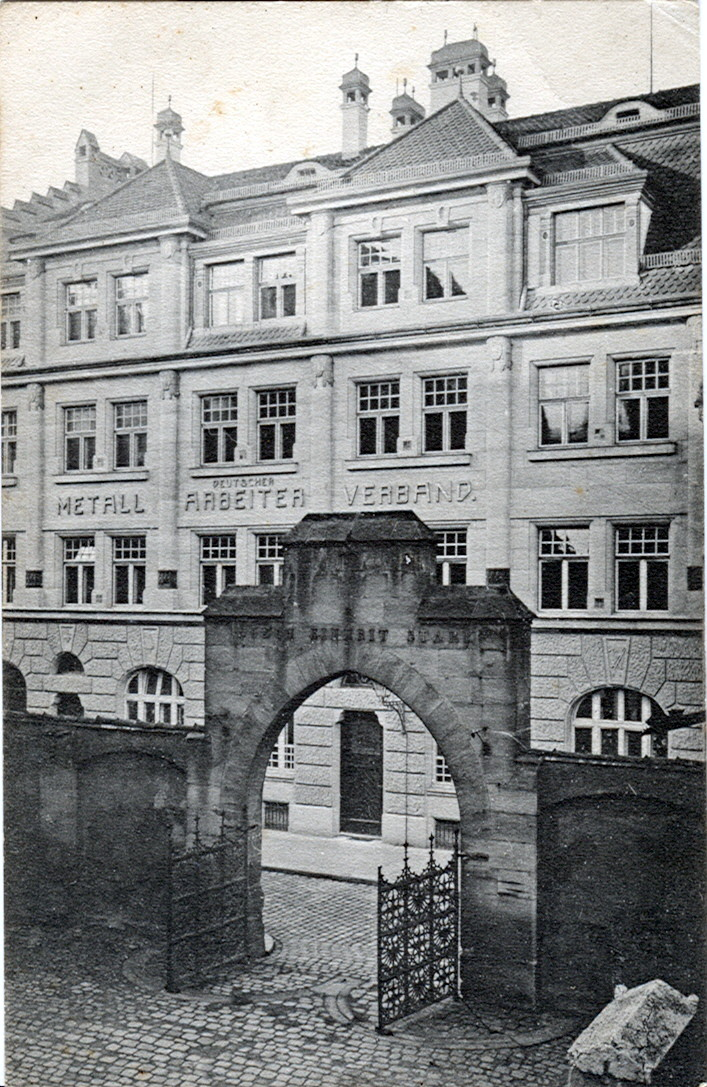
The DMV's building in Nuremberg

German metalworkers started to organize in labor unions in 1868. In 1891, at a congress in Frankfurt from June 1 to June 6, a number of separate unions joined forces to form a single federation with 23,200 members. The DMV was the first industrial union in the country. It was headquartered in Stuttgart. It took over publication of the already extant newspaper Deutsche Metall-Arbeiter-Zeitung. At first, it faced opposition from the established craft unions. Its membership reached 50,000 by 1896, 100,000 in 1901, and over 500,000 by 1913. Its growth was slowed by its failure to gain recognition by employers in large plants in heavy industry until World War I.

During World War I, the DMV, like the rest of the socialist labor movement, did not oppose the country's war efforts and maintained labor peace, a policy known as the Burgfrieden. As the war effort unraveled and revolutionary struggles broke out, metalworkers rebelled as well. They were a major part of the January Strikes, though the union itself helped re-establish order. After government control collapsed in November 1918, most leaders had to leave their posts as a result of having supported the war. Once order was restored, the DMV, which was part of the Allgemeiner Deutscher Gewerkschaftsbund (ADGB), a confederation of socialist unions, attained recognition from employers and its membership spiked to 1.6 million in 1919, briefly making it the single largest union in the world. It was, however, unable to attract younger workers throughout the Weimar years and its membership sank to under a million by 1928. During the 1920s, communists from the Communist Party of Germany (KPD) had considerable influence in the DMV.

After the Nazis gained power in 1933, the DMV was banned on 2 May. Many of its leaders were imprisoned and taken to concentration camps and the union's assets and property were seized. Some of its organizational structures were integrated into the German Labor Front (DAF), the Nazi Party's labor organization. Although the DMV opposed the Nazis, it was unable to put up meaningful resistance against their rule.

After World War II, in 1949, IG Metall was established as the new German federation for metalworkers. It continued the DMV's tradition, but strove to maintain political neutrality, feeling that political discord in the German labor movement had contributed to the Nazis' victory in 1933.

== Mergers ==
The union absorbed several smaller unions:

1892: Union of Locksmiths and Mechanical Engineers
1897: Berlin Metalworkers' Union
1900: Union of Gold and Silver Workers
1901: Central Union of German Formers
1905: German Shipyard Workers' Union (part)
1905: Union of Hanau Gold and Silver Workers
1907: Union of Engravers and Chasers
1912: Central Union of Smiths
1921: Association of Railway Craftsmen
1924: Central Association of Ship Builders of Germany

== Presidents ==
1891: August Junge
1895: Alexander Schlicke
1919: Alwin Brandes, Robert Dißmann and Georg Reichel
1921: Alwin Brandes, Willy Eggert and Georg Reichel
1926: Alwin Brandes and Georg Reichel
