= Otto Brenner =

German trade unionist and politician

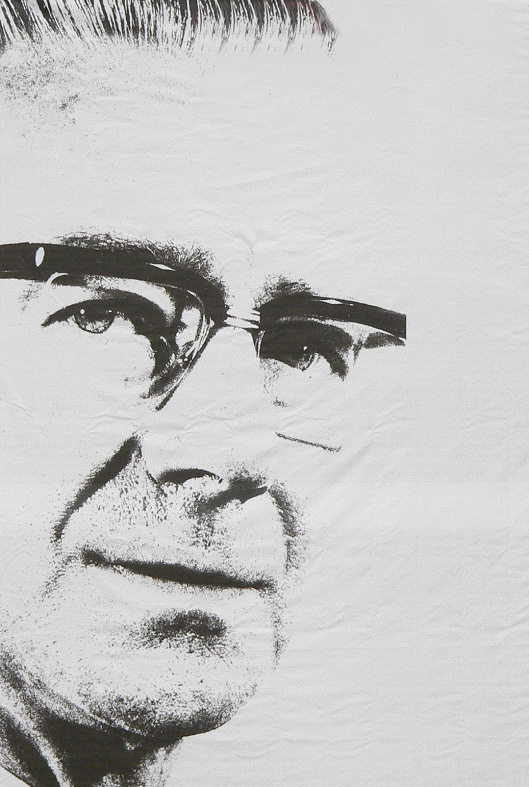
- Born: 11 November 1907; Hanover, Germany
- Died: 15 April 1972 (aged 64); Frankfurt am Main, West Germany
- Occupations: Skilled factory worker Political activist Resistance activist Trades union officer Leader of IG Metall (1956–1972)
- Political party: SPD; SAPD
- Spouse: Martha Werner
- Children: Heike Brenner

Signature
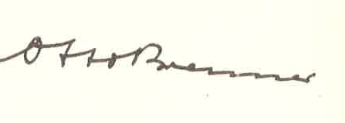

Otto Brenner (8 November 1907 – 15 April 1972) was a German trades unionist and politician. Between 1956 and 1972 he was the leader of the powerful IG Metall (Industrial Union of Metalworkers).

In a tribute published in 1967 to celebrate Brenner's sixtieth birthday the politician-commentator Peter von Oertzen wrote that "Otto Brenner ... embodies more than any other German trades union leader that generation – a link between the older generation of the Weimar years [before 1933] and the younger generation that grew to maturity after 1945 – which rescued the best traditions of the German labour movement to the present day, bridging the intervening abyss of the Fascist rule". (Note: "Otto Brenner ... verkörpert mehr als irgendein anderer deutscher Gewerkschaftsführer jene Generation, die — ein Bindeglied zwischen den Älteren der Weimarer Zeit und den nach 1945 heran-gewachsenen Jüngeren — die Brücke über den Abgrund der faschistischen Herrschaft geschlagen und die besten Überlieferungen der deutschen Arbeiterbewegung in die Gegenwart herübergerettet hat." Peter von Oertzen, 1967 & quoted by himself in 1972)

The Otto-Brenner Foundation for the promotion of scientific research and knowledge is named after him, as is the annually awarded Otto Brenner Prize.

== Life ==
=== Provenance and early years ===
Otto Brenner was born and grew up in Hanover, the third of his parents' four children. His mother was a "washerwoman". With the outbreak of war his father was conscripted for military service and life became harder: Otto was just seven. Hanover was (and remains) home to several large engineering/manufacturing businesses: Brenner eventually trained successfully for work as an industrial electrician. However, the family was not wealthy, and the immediate postwar period was one of acute economic hardship. When he first left school the family could not afford for him to embark on any sort of period of training. Instead he went to work first as a grocery store assistant and then for a small business that manufactured boilers. Here he was engaged in physically heavy work as a rivet-warmer and rivet-presser. He worked next to an extremely hot industrial furnace which produced high levels of carbon monoxide. By the time he reached the age of fifteen he had contracted a severe lung disease which would leave him vulnerable to lung disorders for the rest of his life.

=== Politics and trades unionism ===
He joined the Young Socialists in 1920 and the Metal Workers' Union in 1922. Driven by a conviction that alcohol and tobacco were contributing to the catastrophic material condition and what he perceived as the political lethargy of working people, he campaigned energetically against their misuse, and in 1926 founded a local branch of the German Workers' Abstinence League ("Deutscher Arbeiter-Abstinenten-Bund" / DAAB), taking on the chairmanship himself. He would remain a life-long non-smoker and vegetarian. He consumed alcohol only very sparingly. Meanwhile, it was at the social events organised by the Young Socialists that he met Martha Werner who would subsequently become his wife.

It was in 1925, after a period of illness, that he took unskilled work in the electrical components section of the local Hanomag railway locomotive and road vehicle plant. Taking advantage of adult education opportunities and evening training sessions, he was soon able to qualify as a skilled assembly worker. As a young man he became a sports and fitness enthusiast. He also demonstrated a commitment to political education, leading the Marxist study circle of the Hanover Young Socialists and developing his own (not always uncritical) philosophy of socialism. At around the same time that he launched the local DAAB branch, by now aged 21, he also joined the Social Democratic Party ("Sozialdemokratische Partei Deutschlands" / SPD).

Between 1 November and 3 December 1928 he participated in the so-called Ruhr Iron Strike ("Ruhreisenstreit") which involved, according to at least one source, the largest industrial lock-out in the industrial north-west of Germany during the entire Weimar period. In the end the strikers succeeded in pushing through significant wage increases. Brenner drew valuable lessons about both the responsibilities and the sheer power of trades unions from the experience. However, the Wall Street Crash ten months later ushered in a period of sustained economic downturn across Europe. Unemployment in Germany rose to six million: those affected suffered real hardship. In 1931 Otto Brenner became one of them. Brenner had long held a strong belief in the power of self-education, however, and over the several years of unemployment that ensued he was able to devote more time to reading political books.

As later as 1932 the SPD held the largest number of seats in the Reichstag (national parliament), and even at the July 1932 election they still comfortably out-polled the Communists. Nevertheless, the rise of the extremists and of other right wing parties meant the SPD were no longer part of the government coalition after 1930. It was therefore from a position of relative political weakness that in 1931 the party supported the building of a new generation of war tanks. Citing a "credibility deficit", Brenner resigned angrily from the party. According to some reports he was expelled from it. Either way, he now joined the breakaway Socialist Workers' Party (" Sozialistische Arbeiterpartei Deutschlands" / SAPD). By the start of 1932 the local SAPD for Braunschweig-Hanover had a membership of around 200, and they elected Brenner their branch chairman. The defining purpose of the SAPD was to promote a coming together between the SPD and the Communists (KPD) in order to protect the country from a take-over by right-wing populists. Brenner decried what he saw as the "capitulation policy" ("Kapitulationspolitik") of the SPD leadership and their trades union allies. Later he would make it clear that he believed that the SPD must accept a share of the responsibility for the collapse of Germany's first republic. He called for a "united proletarian front" of the KPD, SPD and SAPD. His urgent arguments, and those of fellow SAPD activists, failed to find significant resonance within the SPD and the KPD, however.

In the light of developments in the Federal Republic of Germany after the Nazi nightmare ended in 1945, it is nevertheless important to emphasize that through the 1930s Brenner never stopped supporting the economic positions of the SPD, especially with regard to economic democracy ("Wirtschaftsdemokratie") as propounded by two particularly influential economists, Peretz Naftali and Rudolf Hilferding. For them, and for Otto Brenner, economic democracy offered the route towards a socialist democratic structure by means of a gradual and peaceful transition. The 1929 market crash and the Great Depression's economic depression that followed, along with the subsequent paralysis of the Reichstag that was ended only by the National Socialist take-over in January 1933, all combined to strengthen Brenner's conviction that, in the context of the relationship between economics and the world of politics, the underlying principal for trades unions must always be that democracy is a prerequisite for trades union activities, and economic actions must be subject to democratic control.

=== National Socialism and war ===
Regime change was followed by a rapid transition to one-party dictatorship during the first part of 1933. The SAPD, like most other political parties, became illegal. Otto Brenner nevertheless believed in the need to use the party as an instrument of resistance to tyranny, and despite the ban continued to work on party recruitment and organisation. There are references to his having led and/or been part of the "SAPD Resistance Group" in Hanover with his brother and sister-in-law Kurt and Käte Brenner. He visited a number of cities in order to create and build contacts with local SAPD parties across the country.

During the summer of 1933 he was also involved with the Committee for Proletarian Unity, a resistance group built up since 1930 by the Hanover communist Eduard Wald, apparently in anticipation of the National Socialist take-over. The extent and nature of Brenner's involvement in the group is hard to determine, however, and it probably lasted for no more than a few months.

An important personal development was Brenner's marriage to his long-time friend Martha Werner on 3 August 1933.

In the immediate aftermath of the Reichstag fire the authorities concentrated their harassment/persecution on political activists identified as communists. Many were arrested and others fled abroad. On 30 August 1930, however, after he returned from one of his trips, Otto Brenner was arrested and taken into investigatory custody. During the eighteen months of uncertainty that followed he was permitted to remain in touch with his wife by letter. The charge, when it came on 9 May 1935, was the usual one under these circumstances: "Preparing to commit high treason" ("Vorbereitung zum Hochverrat"). The verdict was largely a foregone conclusion, but the sentence, delivered by the Hamm District Court on 25 June 1935, was relatively mild. He was sentenced to a two-year jail term. This had largely been spent in pre-trial detention, and a few months later he was able to return to his wife in Hanover-Buchholz. He remained under police surveillance till the end of the 1939–45 war, however.

Following release he was permitted to work as an electrician in and around Hanover, though during the next ten years the risk of re-arrest never went away. He was deemed "wehrunwürdig" ("unfit for military service") and therefore, despite the return of war in September 1939, he avoided conscription. He was, however, sent to work in Frankfurt on civil engineering projects and as a courier for the Frankfurter Zeitung.

A couple of years after the war started, on 1 October 1941, Heike Brenner, the Brenners' only child, was born.

During the final part of the war Brenner was back in Hanover, able to experience the destructive British and American bombing which peaked in the Autumn/Fall of 1943; but the bombs continued to drop till April 1945. Having lived through the German disaster between 1933 and 1945, Otto Brenner drew one conclusion in particular to which he would remain true for the rest of his life: "Another 1933 must never be allowed to happen." (Note: "Es darf nie wieder zu einem 1933 kommen!")

=== Aftermath of war ===
Hanover was liberated by the US 84th Infantry Division on 10 April 1945. Otto Brenner and his family had survived. Filled with the hope that it might at last be possible to build a new life Brenner committed himself unreservedly to rebuilding the city. True to his longstanding conviction that the war represented a crisis-management response to issues involving capitalist means of production, he concluded that under a capitalist system there could never be true peace. This meant that the post-war order must deliver a non-exploitative, non-capitalist socialist society. After various exploratory political contacts, he decided to rejoin the Social Democrats. Although the important decision would have been his alone, one factor in it will have been discussion with Kurt Schumacher who had settled in Hanover following his liberation from the Neuengamme concentration camp. Schumacher also persuaded Brenner to become active in local and "national" politics in (and possibly beyond) what was administered between 1945 and 1949 as the British occupation zone.

=== Rebuilding trades unionism ===
Early on Brenner decided to devote himself to recreating the trades unions, which had been destroyed under the Hitler government. In May 1945 he was a co-founder of the General Trades Union in the territory which by the end of 1946 had been relaunched as the state of Lower Saxony ("Allgemeinen Gewerkschaft Niedersachsen"). In 1947 he became chairman of the union's Metals Division ("Wirtschaftsgruppe Metall"), and thereby a paid trades union official. The structure of the General Trades Union reflected a compromise for the creation of a single unified trades union, free from political and religious, but also free of professional/vocational distinctions. Brenner however, like most trades unionists, advocated a structure involving individual industry-sector based trades unions organised under the aegis of a single trades union confederation: that is the structure that was subsequently adopted and which operates to this day.

The first industrial strike in postwar Germany took place in December 1946 at the Hanover plant of Bode-Panzer. It lasted 23 days. Brenner was the most prominent of the strike leaders, and his name appeared in news reports far beyond the Hanover city limits. The dispute, taking place when Germany was still under the "dictatorship of military occupation", was in support of "the socialisation of production and economic democracy". Brenner demanded "full co-decision rights for factory and office employees in the enterprise and in the economy". (Note: "... das volle Mitbestimmungsrecht der Arbeiter und Angestellten im Betriebe und in der Wirtschaft") After a hard-fought struggle Brenner succeeded in concluding a benchmark agreement, which gave the works council a comprehensive package of co-determination rights covering recruitment, remuneration, production planning and working methods. In most cases other businesses in the area, when threatened with strike action, chose to head off the threat by adopting equivalent agreements in respect of their own factories. His reputation buoyed by these successes, in 1947 Brenner became district head of what would become IG Metall Hanover.

=== Trades unions as an engine for social reform ===
For Otto Brenner political and social democracy were indivisible. Therefore, his principal twin-track objective for the postwar order was for economic democracy and co-determination. Even if the top priority for a negotiation was wage rates, his approach to trades union strategy was always a far wider one, grounded in a social philosophical vision. For him the unions had a comprehensive political, social and cultural mandate to fulfill: that involved achieving social change through democratic methods. That meant that for Brenner, capitalism, which after 1949 West Germans experienced as the "social market economy" ("soziale Marktwirtschaft"), also incorporated private ownership of the means of production, giving rise to an unequal balance of power and control/ownership in the political sphere. From this clearly followed, for him, that the cream of sustained German postwar prosperity would fade relatively quickly. He therefore hoped for an overcoming of capitalism or, failing that, a far reaching taming of it. He summarized his underlying conviction in the following way: "The economy is not there simply to serve its own ends. It has to serve human needs and society's objectives". (Note: "Die Wirtschaft ist kein Selbstzweck. Sie hat menschlichen Bedürfnissen und gesellschaftlichen Zwecken zu dienen".) This also corresponded with the "Economic Policy Ground-rules" – generally referred to subsequently as the "Munich Ground-rules Programme" ("Münchener Grundsatzprogramm") – adopted by the German Trades Union Confederation ("Deutscher Gewerkschaftsbund" / DGB) at its (re)founding congress in Munich in October 1949. A particular case in point is the programme's demand for "the transfer of key industries to common ownership, especially the mining, iron and steel industries, as well as the major chemicals firms, the energy sector, major transport providers and credit institutes". (Note: "...Überführung der Schlüßelindustrien in Gemeineigentum, insbesondere des Bergbaues, der Eisen- und Stahlindustrie, der Großchemie, der Energiewirtchaft, der wichtigen Verkehrseinrichtungen und der Kreditinstitute".)

During the early 1950s Otto Brenner was a member of the "Circle of Ten" ("Zehnerkreis"). This was an informal group of leading decision makers from IG Metall and the DGB. The fact that their regular meetings were "secret" seems, over time, to have intensified interest in the "Circle" among commentators and journalists. Other members included Brenner's former ISK friends Hermann Beermann and Werner Hansen. There were also three former communists: Eduard Wald, Kuno Brandel and "Siggi" Neumann. Behind the scenes the "Circle of Ten" exercised a powerful influence over key personnel selections and strategic decisions taken by the trades union movement. During the later 1950s the circle disintegrated as the members' socio-political ambitions diverged.

The West German election result of 1949 saw Konrad Adenauer's CDU-FDP coalition narrowly winning power, which was both a disappointment for SPD supporters (such as Otto Brenner) and a surprise for commentators and others from across the political spectrum. For Brenner and the trades union movement more widely the result represented a temporary deferral but not an abolition for their shared objective of a rapid and fundamental transformation of social relationships in the newly launched German Federal Republic (West Germany). (Note: Three of the four military occupation zones into which the western two thirds of Germany had been divided back in 1945 were grouped together and relaunched, in May 1949, as the US sponsored German Federal Republic (West Germany). The Soviet occupation zone remained separate, and was itself relaunched as the Soviet sponsored German Democratic Republic (East Germany) five months later. "German reunification" took place slightly over four decades later.) Between 1952 and 1956 Otto Brenner served as vice-chairman of IG Metall, with Hans Brümmer as senior chairman. A second general election defeat for the SPD in 1953 was deeply disappointing. There would be no rapid end to "capitalism". Brenner refused to see that as a reason to compromise on the basic tenets of the "Munich Programme" agreed within the DGB in 1949. Indeed, he saw it as all the more reason to intensify pressure to address the most extreme social inequalities, even if in the short term the best – or only – route available to the unions in pursuit of that objective might be ratcheting up pressure in respect of wages negotiations. Eloquent testimony to this was commitment was the commitment he showed to the developing and implementing the DGB action plan which he himself co-initiated in May 1954. By means of significant wage and salary increases, the introduction of holiday pay and the gradual move to a 40-hour working week. IG Metall under his influence – and subsequently under his leadership – made a crucial contribution to improving the quality of life for both workers and employers, in a country where rapid economic recovery and growth were by this time opening the way to increased levels of general prosperity. Because of the extent to which Brenner set the course for IG Metall as vice-chairman, there was no major change of direction when he assumed sole leadership of the union in 1956. Brenner was feared as a tough negotiator, but capable of compromise, his demands were not simply for parity between negotiating partners, but also that employers and employees should receive a fair share of the wealth they jointly generated. The reduction in the working week was also, in part, an excursion into emancipatory social policy, giving as it did more free time both to workers and to employers. By 1965, step by step, the point had been reached where the union and the metals industry employers signed off on the core 40-hour week, running from Monday to Friday. But there was, again, a consciously social element in all this, which is expressed in the slogan "Dad belongs to me on Saturdays" ("Samstag gehört Vati mir!"). There was also an understanding that reducing the standard working week could be a way to secure more jobs, thereby doing something to counteract the steady march of "workplace rationalisation".

=== Politics ===
Alongside the business of wage negotiations and promoting a social-political strategy, there was necessarily always a more directly party-political dimension to trades union leadership during Otto Brenner's time at the top. From beyond the no longer so porous internal border, reports seeping through from friends and relatives of the short-lived and brutally suppressed 1953 East German uprising did nothing to refute the growing belief that the postwar Communist Party of Germany should best be understood as a proxy for Soviet imperialist aspirations. Nevertheless, the Communist party's rebranded sister party east of the "iron Curtain" had become the ruling party in a new kind of one-party dictatorship. Despite the fact that in West Germany the Communist Party never came close to receiving the levels of electoral support it had enjoyed before 1933, the power underlying Soviet-backed communism was a reality in West Germany from 1945 till long after Brenner left the stage. In the inter-union conflicts that were a feature of the West German industrial scene during the 1950s he was uncompromising in his hostility to communist activism, which he saw as a serious threat to trades union solidarity. Within IG Metall Brenner rigorously excluded from positions of power any trades unionists who refused to distance themselves from the goals of the KPD and SED. Just as resolutely – if a little less brutally – he rejected aspirations to positions of power of any "Christian-Socialist" unionists who, even while they complained that the DGB's close links to the Social Democratic Party undermined party-political neutraility, were themselves closely associated with the centre-right CDU and (Bavarian) CSU whose influence within the DGB they were happy (if without much success) to try and promote.

Under Brenner's leadership IG Metall saw itself explicitly as a "political trades union", with not just the right, but the duty to "take a position on political questions that affect the welfare of millions of working people", and not to restrict itself to the narrow fields of wages and social policy. Brenner claimed this duty of intervene most especially if he saw that the democratic principles of the Federal Republic were threatened, because he recognised that preserving the rule of law in as democratic state governed by laws was the indispensable precondition for the successful operation of trades unions. His own experiences led him to doubt the democratic substance of postwar West German democracy. The Spiegel affair in 1962 confirmed him in his assessment that "the democratic order, and above all those called upon to serve as its guardians, are still not immune from the temptations of authoritarian undemocratic operations". (Note: "... die demokratische Ordnung und vor allem ihre berufenen Hüter nochimmer nicht gegen die Anfechtungen einer autoritären, undemokratischen Handhabung gefeit sind") A few years later he unhesitatingly lined up the union alongside the "Extra parliamentary opposition" during the run-up to the contentious "Emergency Acts" constitutional amendments eventually imposed on the country in 1968 by the Allied Control Council. His distrust of a resurgent authoritarian militarism caused him to reject West German re-armament and, in particular to oppose nuclear rearmament or the stationing of nuclear forces in German soil. His opposition to the arms build-up was reinforced by his conviction that militarisation on the ground made it even harder to envisage any future peaceful reunification of the two Germanies on either side of the iron curtain. That was also why he opposed the Paris conventions ratified in 1955, which he saw as a move to integrate West Germany into the west. He contended that if the two German states were integrated into competing international power blocs, a rapid peaceful reunification would become unthinkable.

The real problem for Brenner and IG Metall was that during the postwar decades there was, in West Germany, no appetite for the politics of the left. At home the economic and socio-political fruits of the so-called Wirtschaftswunder (economic miracle) years did little to engender political protest. Internationally the use of Soviet military muscle in 1956 to crush reform movements in Hungary and Poland, the Suez Crisis of the same year, the sealing off of the internal German border during the 1950s, culminating in with the erection of the Berlin Wall in 1961, the Cuban Missile Crisis of 1962 and the overall intensification of Cold War tensions which brought the world to the brink of nuclear war combined to determine that during the 1950s and most of the 1960s insufficient West Germany voters were willing to vote against the centre-right CDU/CSU coalition under the reassuring leaderships of Adenauer, Erhard and Kiesinger.

A succession of disappointing results in national elections persuaded the SPD to take a fundamentally new direction in the later 1950s, transforming itself from a "socialist workers' party" to a "people's party". The new strategy was embodied in the Godesberg Program, ratified at a party convention on 15 November 1959. Overtly Marxist terms such as "class struggle", "socialisation of key industrial sectors" and "planned economy" were consigned to history. There was to be no more talk of a new socialist order. In its place, the party committed to further developments, improvements and refinements of existing economic and social structures. This "course correction" to the party programme went decisively beyond what might have been acceptable to Otto Brenner, who argued consistently for the retention of the earlier party objectives, the most pressing of which was, for him and his union comrades, "socialisation of key industrial sectors". He campaigned with characteristic energy against the changes, both in the discussions that took place between 1954 and 1958 with the "programme commission" drawing up what became the Godesberg Program and, especially, in parallel discussions for a new Godesberg-compatible Trades Union Confederation (DGB) programme. Within the DGB this set him at odds with the so-called modernisers, such as Georg Leber, the long-standing leader of the IG Bau-Steine-Erden (loosely, "building workers' union"), who was advocating a departure from the "Munich programme" of 1949 and a new conception of trades unionism based on social partnership. For Brenner that was totally unacceptable. Specifically, if the need to obtain political power with a democratic parliamentary majority meant converting the SPD from a "class-party" to a "people's party", the result would be to blur the inherent conflict of interests between labour and capital, and involve transforming the two sides in a wages negotiation into "social partners". Brenner rejected such a model, as did his colleagues on the union executive. With equal vigour they rejected Leber's attempts to redefine the role of trades unions in the state and in society. Brenner also rejected repeated demands that trades unions must take a share in responsibility for the wider economy. He was challenged with the metaphor that the unions were in the same boat as other members of society. The destiny of the nation was a shared destiny for good and ill. Brenner would reply that everyone was indeed in the same boat and all could look forward to a shared destiny. But that was no reason to feign indifference as to the identity of the pilot, the composition of the ship's crew and the small matter of how decisions were made as to the direction of travel. It must be acknowledged that despite the vehemence with which he opposed the Godesberg changes and the differences of opinion involved, Brenner refused to infer any conflict of interest between the SPD and the trades unions. Between Social Democracy and the free trades union movement in West Germany there existed an "organic solidarity" firmly entrenched in shared underlying interests.

==== City council and regional parliament ====
Between 1946 and 1953 Brenner served as an SPD City councillor ("Ratsherr") in Hannover. Between 6 May 1951 and his exclusion from it 15 February 1954 he was a member of the Landtag of Lower Saxony, representing the Hannover-Linden electoral district. During that period he served, between 14 June 1951 and 9 February 1953 as chairman of the assembly's Social Affairs committee.

== Fundamental beliefs ==
Brenner never compromised his conviction that the "strike weapon" was inalienable as a means to enforce workers' rights in any bourgeois democracy. The absence of any "right to strike" was one of his core criticisms of the German Democratic Republic (East Germany): a party and a government that denied workers the fundamental right to strike had no right to hold itself out as representing the interests of the workers, nor any right to solicit favours from the trades union movement in West Germany or to impart "good advice" ("gute Ratschläge") to them.

For almost ten years Brenner was among those opposing the "Emergency Acts" constitutional amendments (which eventually came into force, as the 17th amendment, in 1968). In his judgement, consciously or unconsciously, they were a means whereby the political class put West Germany's young democracy on the line. It mattered. When they passed the so-called "Basic Law" (provisional constitution) in 1949, the legislators had left out any comprehensive regulation in respect of a potential emergency situation concerning the reservation of rights to the allied occupying powers. In the event of a domestic emergency (such as a natural catastrophe) or an international emergency (such as a war) there were simply a set of "laws in the cupboard" ("Schubladengesetze") which, if implemented, would impose severe constraints on citizens' rights. It was only on 5 May 1955 that West Germany was declared to enjoy "the full authority of a sovereign state", following the Paris agreements the previous year: this opened up the possibility for "completion" of the constitutional settlement, and the point was one which West Germany's allies had been insistent. A succession of West German governments set to work to make good the earlier omission, but every draft proposal for incorporating provision of "emergency acts" in the constitution involved drastic curtailments of fundamental human rights. Brenner was able to bring a keen historical perspective to the matter, having himself lived through the curtailment of basic rights during the Hitler years. The National Socialist government had invoked "emergency" conditions to introduce "emergency legislation" which had put an end to democracy for twelve years, and it was hard to find anyone who would assert that the government of that time had used its enhanced powers to benefit the people. The "emergency acts" constitutional amendments threatened to the constitutional legality of trades unions. Taking the matter back to first principles, Brenner was convinced that the constitutional rules imposed in 1919 and again in 1949 had left the way open for a "legally sanctioned" reversal of history, taking the country back to a pre-democratic condition (which, many believed, was already happening in East Germany). West Germany remained a "capitalist class-based society": the role of the trades unions in defending the positions of working people was an important one. Just as he compared the proposed "emergency acts" with the infamous Article 48 of the Weimar constitution, he recalled the greatest general strike in German history, which the unions had organised in 1920 (as requested by some government ministers) to defend the young republic against the Kapp Putsch.

Otto Brenner always believed that there was a residual latent danger of Fascism in the German Federal Republic (West Germany), not because he feared a National Socialist revival in the state formed under Adenauer during the 1950s. The risk he saw was rather the progressive distortion of the democracy through a combination of mistakes by politicians, economic crises and socio-psychological insecurities. Within the DGB and the SPD only a minority of the memberships shared Brenner's views over this. Eventually, during the course of coalition negotiations in 1966, the SPD and the CDU agreed to a version of the "Emergency Acts" constitutional amendments which passed into law in 1968. Brenner respected the Bundestag decision, much to the disappointment of various younger union colleagues who had hoped that he would call a general strike over the issue. Brenner was adamant that as a democrat he had to respect a parliamentary majority decision even when he believed it to wrong. At the 9th IG Metall congress in 1968 he spelled out his position: "Calling a general strike against a decision by parliament, as some trades unionists had demanded, was quite impossible. It would have meant opposing the existing constitutional order, and in any case, there was no way that a call for a general strike would have been obeyed by a majority of the people". (Note: "Ein Generalstreik gegenden Beschluss des Parlaments auszurufen, wie das manche von den Gewerkschaften verlangt haben, war allerdings unmöglich. Er hätte sich unmittelbar gegen die bestehende Verfassungsordnung gewendet, ganz zu Schweigen davon, dass die Generalstreiksparole keineswegs von einer Mehrheit der Bevölkerung befolgt worden wäre.) Expecting that Otto Brenner might call a general strike against a government in which his own party was a coalition partner would have involved expecting a long-standing champion of social-democracy to become a revolutionary. Brenner was no revolutionary and never wished to become one.

Otto Brenner died of Cardiovascular disease in April 1972, aged just 64. Werner Thönnessen, his former presschief, contributed an obituary to Der Spiegel: "achieving Civil democracy 'by democratising the economy became Brenner's greatest objective. He found his failure to achieve it a painful thing. Acutely aware of the inherent contradiction in which trades unions become enmeshed if they try to enforce improvements to the economic order from the bottom up, which nevertheless become necessary both to improve the condition of the workers and to extend the life expectancy of capitalism".

== Celebration (selection) ==
- The "Otto Brenner Bridge" ("Otto-Brenner-Brücke") which forms part of the de:Bundesstraße 4 RNuremberg Ring Autobahn was named in his honour.
- The "Joseph Street" ("Josephstraße") was renamed Otto Brenner Street ("Otto-Brenner-Straße") in 1972
- The Otto-Brenner (journalism) prize has been awarded in his memory since 2005.
