= IG Metall =

Dominant metalworkers' union in Germany

Coordinates: 50°6′12″N 8°39′58″E

IGM
- German Metalworkers' Union
- Industriegewerkschaft Metall
- Founded: September 1, 1949, West Germany
- Headquarters: Frankfurt, Germany
- Location: Germany
- Members: ▼2,015,495 (2025)
- Key people: Jörg Hofmann; Christiane Benner
- Affiliations: DGB
- Website: www.igmetall.de

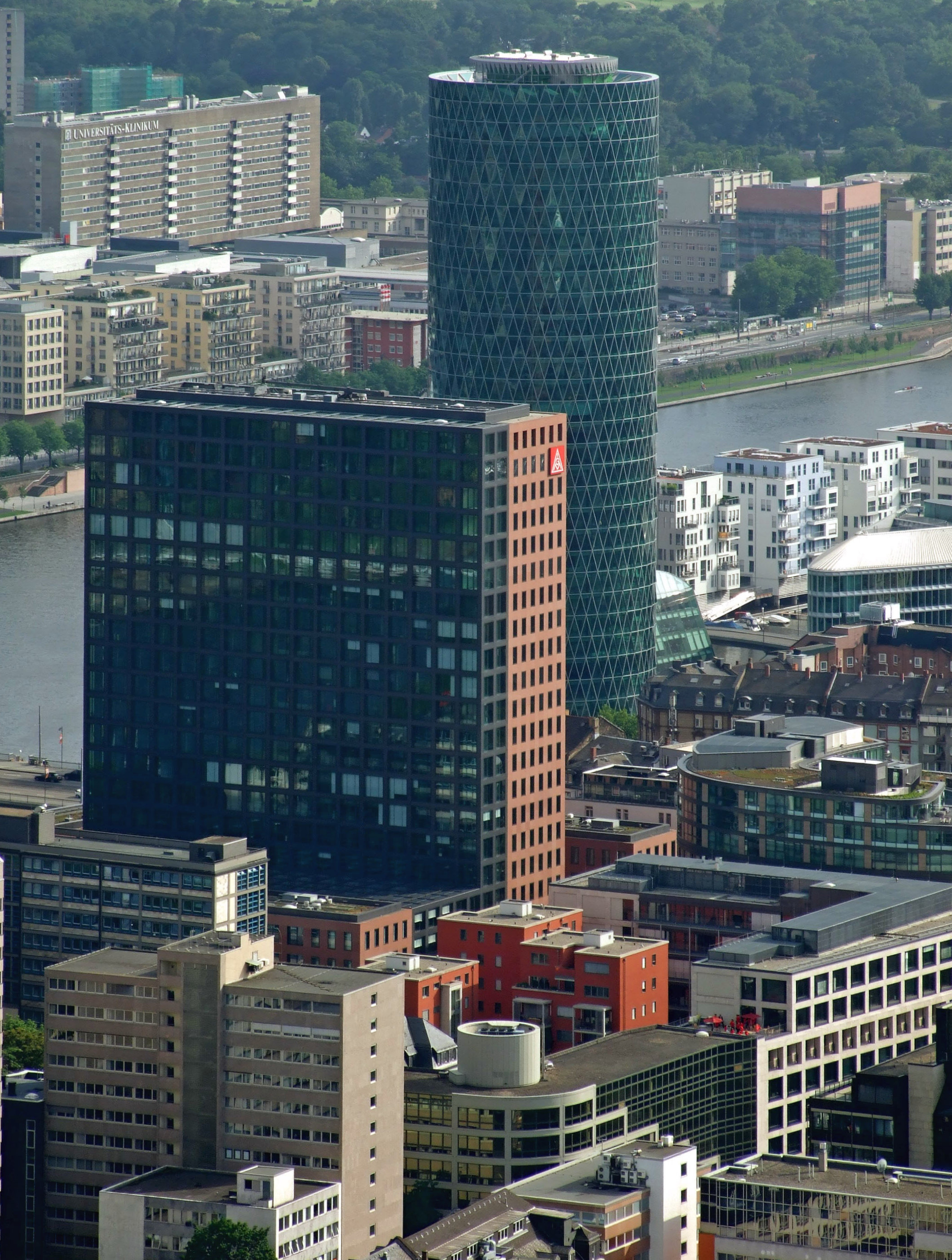
Headquarters in Frankfurt

IG Metall (German: [iːɡeː meˈtal]; IGM; German: Industriegewerkschaft Metall, "Industrial Union of Metalworkers'") is the dominant metalworkers' union in Germany, making it the country's largest union as well as Europe's largest industrial union. Analysts of German labor relations consider it a major trend-setter in national bargaining.

IG Metall and ver.di together account for around 15 percent of the German workforce, and other sectors tend to broadly follow their agreements.

== History ==
IG Metall was founded in 1949. Its name, "IG Metall", refers to the union's roots dating back to the start of unions in imperial Germany in the 1890s. Over the years the union has taken on representation in industries beyond mining of minerals to include manufacturing and industrial production, machinists, the printing industry, automobile manufacturing, and steel production as part of its blue-collar roots. It also includes more white-collar sectors, such as electrical and other forms of engineering and information systems. It has also combined with formerly separate unions for workers in wood, plastics, textiles and clothing, includes non-metal blue-collar workers. On April 1, 1998, the Textile and Clothing Union (GTB) joined IG Metall. On January 1, 2000, the Wood and Plastic Union (GHK), also joined.

Deals agreed by IG Metall in the pilot region of Baden-Württemberg, an industrial and car-making hub and home to Daimler and Bosch, have traditionally served as templates for agreements across the country.

Concessions secured by IG Metall for its members include:

- Five-day work week (1959)
- Paid vacation time concessions (1962)
- 40 hr work week (1965–1967)
- Paid sick leave (1956)
- 35-hour work week (attempted, but not successful in 1984)
- 35-hour work week in the metal industry (1995)

In 2016, IG Metall made a deal with employers giving 3.8 million workers in the metalworking sector a two-stage pay rise of 4.8 percent over 21 months. After a series of strikes, the union made a deal in 2018 to allow staff to cut their working week to 28 hours for up to two years to care for children or other relatives. Amid the COVID-19 pandemic in Germany, IG Metall proposed negotiating for a move to a four-day week to protect jobs from the economic effects of the COVID-19 pandemic and structural shifts in the automobile industry.

=== Major strikes ===
Strikes are rare in Germany, where companies and unions strive for consensus whenever possible. One of the first strikes of IG Metall lasted seven weeks in 1984 in the states of Baden-Württemberg and Hesse, which led to a reduction in the workweek to 35 hours from 37. Another major strike was organized by IG Metall in 1995, when up to 11,000 workers in Bavaria remained off the job for two weeks. In 2002, IG Metall called a wave of one-day strikes in a demand for a 6.5 percent increase in wages; German industry settled the dispute two weeks later by offering a raise of roughly 4 percent. In 2003, the union was forced to drop its campaign for a shorter workweek in the factories of eastern Germany after its hard-nosed negotiating tactics were repudiated by Germans across the political spectrum. In early 2018, more than 900,000 workers took part in industrial action in support of IG Metall's demands for higher pay and the right to shortened working hours.

In autumn 2024, warning strikes of workers in electrical engineering and metal industries were held after collective bargaining negotiations fell short. In these negotiations, employers offered a 3.6% pay rise over a period of 27 months which was considerably lower than the 7% sought by IG Metall. Companies criticised IG Metall's demands as unrealistic due to a general slowdown in German industry. IG Metall however pointed out high inflation and the failure to attract much-needed skilled labour.

Also in 2024, IG Metall agreed with Volkswagen on more than 35,000 job cuts and sharp capacity reductions after two separate strikes, the largest in Volkswagen's history, protesting against cost-cutting plans, and 70 hours of negotiations, the longest in the company's history.

== Membership ==
Today IG Metall mainly represents employees at major car makers, such as Daimler, BMW, Porsche, Volkswagen, Audi and industrial giants such as Siemens, ThyssenKrupp, Airbus, Salzgitter AG, ArcelorMittal, Bosch, ZF and smaller mechanic construction companies and car-mechanics. Its membership had been dropping in recent decades — it lost 250,000 members in 1993 alone —, yet the union managed to somewhat reverse that trend recently by gaining 30,000 members between 2010 and 2015. A record in wage deals, along with a push to recruit more women, young people (e.g. students) and white-collar workers, helped it boost 2015 membership by 121,000 to 2.3 million and income by 3.4 percent to 533 million euros ($582 million); this rise came against a backdrop of generally declining union in Germany.

=== Notable members ===
- Norbert Blüm — former Federal Minister of Labour and Social Affairs
- Sigmar Gabriel — former Vice Chancellor of Germany
- Hannelore Kraft — former Minister-President of North Rhine-Westphalia
- Heiko Maas — former Federal Minister for Foreign Affairs
- Hans Matthöfer — former Federal Minister of Finance
- Andrea Nahles — former Federal Minister of Labour and Social Affairs
- Svenja Schulze — former Federal Minister of the Environment, Nature Conservation and Nuclear Safety
- Carsten Sieling — former President of the Senate and Mayor of the Free Hanseatic City of Bremen

== Organisation structure ==
=== Regional districts ===
IG Metall consists of 7 Bezirke (districts) which are subdivided in Verwaltungstellen (administrative areas):

- Bezirk Baden-Württemberg headquarters located in Stuttgart; 28 Verwaltungstellen
- Bezirk Bayern (Bavaria) headquarters located in Munich; 21 Verwaltungstellen
- Bezirk Berlin-Brandenburg-Sachsen (Berlin + Brandenburg + Saxony) headquarters located in Berlin; 12 Verwaltungstellen
- Bezirk Frankfurt (Saarland + Rhineland-Palatinate + Hesse + Thuringia) headquarters located in Frankfurt/Main; 27 Verwaltungstellen
- Bezirk Küste ("Küste"= "Sea Coast") (Bremen + Hamburg + Schleswig-Holstein + Mecklenburg-Western Pomerania + North Lower Saxony) headquarters located in Hamburg; 19 Verwaltungstellen
- Bezirk Niedersachsen und Sachsen-Anhalt (Middle/South Lower Saxony + Saxony-Anhalt) headquarters located in Hanover; 20 Verwaltungstellen
- Bezirk Nordrhein-Westfalen (North Rhine-Westphalia) headquarters located in Düsseldorf; 47 Verwaltungstellen

=== Chairs ===
| Era | Chair(s) | 2nd Chair |
|---|---|---|
| 1949–1950* | Hans Brümmer; Walter Freitag; Wilhelm Petersen | |
| 1950–1952 | Hans Brümmer | Walter Freitag |
| 1952–1956 | Hans Brümmer | Otto Brenner |
| 1956–1968 | Otto Brenner | |
| 1968–1972 | Otto Brenner | Eugen Loderer |
| 1972–1983 | Eugen Loderer | Hans Mayr |
| 1983–1986 | Hans Mayr | Franz Steinkühler |
| 1986–1989 | Franz Steinkühler | Karl-Heinz Jansen |
| 1989–1993 | Franz Steinkühler | Klaus Zwickel |
| 1993–1998 | Klaus Zwickel | Walter Riester |
| 1998–2003 | Klaus Zwickel | Jürgen Peters |
| 2003–2007 | Jürgen Peters | Berthold Huber |
| 2007–2013 | Berthold Huber | Detlef Wetzel |
| 2013–2015 | Detlef Wetzel | Jörg Hofmann |
| 2015–2023 | Jörg Hofmann | Christiane Benner |
| 2023– | Christiane Benner | Jürgen Kerner |

*Until 1956, IGM had two co-equal chairpersons. Thereafter, the organization changed to a 1st Chair and 2nd Chair, with the 2nd Chair being traditionally promoted to 1st Chair upon the retirement of the 1st Chair. However, Alois Wöhrle (1969) and Karl-Heinz Janzen (1992) retired without advancing to 1st Chair, while Walter Riester (1998) became Federal Minister of Labour and therefore dropped out.

=== International relations ===
IG Metall is a member of the German Trade Union Confederation (Deutscher Gewerkschaftsbund, DGB). IGM is also a member of some international union umbrella organisations, including IndustriALL – European Trade Union and the IndustriALL Global Union.

In 2015, IG Metall and the U.S. United Automobile Workers (UAW) announced that they would deepen their partnership and set up an office in Tennessee to boost labor rights at German automakers and their suppliers based in the United States.

== metall magazine ==
The IGM magazine, metallzeitung, has existed since 1949. In 2005 it had a circulation of over 2 million. There are 12 issues per year.
