= John Lovblad =

Swedish trade unionist and politician

His Excellency John Lovblad
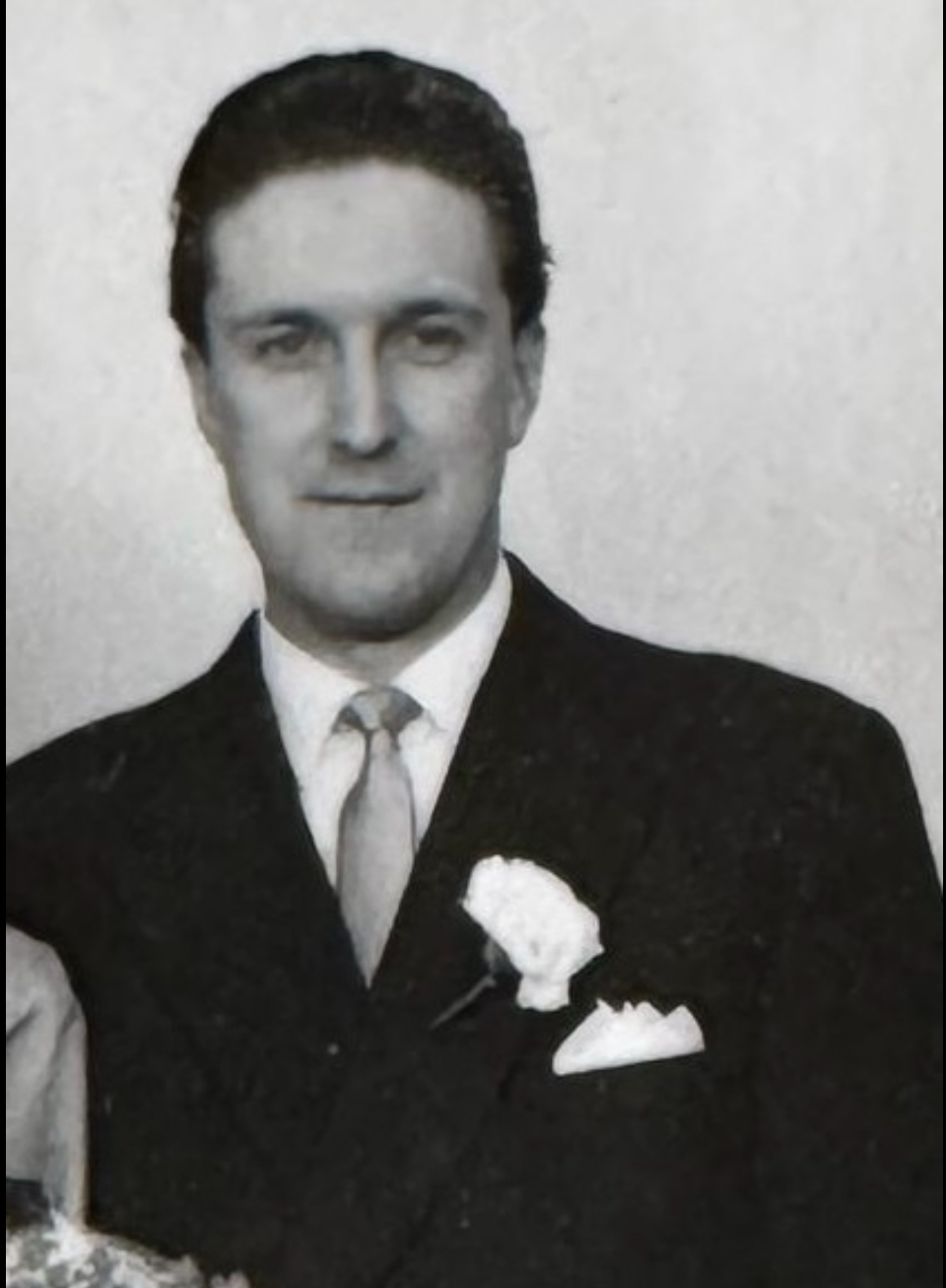
- Lovblad in 1959

General Secretary of the International Federation of Building and Woodworkers
- In office 1966–1989
- Preceded by: Arne Hagen
- Succeeded by: Ulf Asp

Personal details
- Born: John Erik Lovblad; February 14 1926 Gunnarskog, Sweden
- Died: January 17 2016 Geneva, Switzerland
- Party: Social Democratic
- Education: Columbia University, University of Manchester

Military service
- Allegiance: King Gustaf V
- Branch/service: Swedish Armed Forces
- Unit: Royal Guard

John Erik Lovblad (14 February 1926 – 17 January 2016), also known as Löfblad, was a Swedish politician, diplomat, and trade unionist who served as Secretary General of the International Federation of Building and Woodworkers (IFBWW) from 1966 to 1989.

A longtime protégé of Swedish Prime Ministers Olof Palme and Tage Erlander, Lovblad was an active member of the Swedish Social Democratic Party and became involved in trade unionism early in his career. In 1962, on the personal recommendation of Prime Minister Tage Erlander, he was appointed by King Gustaf VI Adolf to serve as Labour Attaché at the Swedish Embassy in Washington, D.C. Four years later, in 1966, he was elected General Secretary of the IFBWW, a position he held until his retirement in 1989.

Lovblad was a staunch advocate for improving social conditions through cooperation, firmly opposing strikes as a means of progress. A lifelong anti-communist, he actively fought against labor exploitation, humanitarian crises, and social injustices worldwide.

== Early life ==
John Erik Lovblad was born on February 14, 1926, on the farm Backarna, located in the forests of Gunnarskog, in Värmland County, Sweden. He was the son of Gustaf Löfblad and Marta Ahs. After completing six years of elementary school, he trained as a lumberjack. The harsh conditions of his early life left a lasting impression on him and helped spark a lifelong drive for societal improvement.

During his early years, the family moved to another farm called Risbofallet.His childhood was notably shaped by the Second World War and the farm’s proximity to the Norwegian border. It was during this time, listening to the radio to follow global events, that he began teaching himself English and German. This experience also sparked a deep and lifelong interest in the history of World War II.

These intellectual pursuits and his growing awareness of international affairs set him apart from many of his peers and hinted at the global outlook he would later develop. He would often recall a moment that captured this contrast: running out excitedly to announce the D-Day landings by shouting, “They have arrived!”, only to be met with the puzzled response, “Who then?” (“Ockre då?” in the local dialect).

In the years that followed, John Erik became increasingly involved in his local community. He joined the Swedish Woodworkers Union and actively participated in efforts to improve working conditions. He was also involved in local sports, serving as secretary of the Gunnarskog Sports Association from 1948 to 1954. A dedicated orienteer, he remained passionate about sports throughout his life.

== Military service in Sweden ==
When John Lovblad was called up for his compulsory military service, he achieved exceptionally high scores during the recruitment assessments. His results were so far above expectations, especially given his limited formal education, that the examiners suspected he had cheated. As a result, they required him to retake the exams under closer supervision. Much to their surprise, he once again achieved outstanding scores.

Although his lack of a high school diploma made him ineligible to apply to officer training school, he was instead offered a position in the military police. He served in this role from 1946 to 1947, and was stationed in Stockholm as a member of the Royal Palace Guard. This experience proved pivotal in broadening his horizons, offering him his first real exposure to life beyond the rural confines of his upbringing.

== Local politics ==
From an early age, John Lovblad developed a strong interest in politics and joined the Swedish Social Democratic Youth League (SSU). At the time, in 1943, there was no local SSU chapter in Gunnarskog, so he registered directly with the national headquarters in Stockholm. His initiative led to the founding of a local section, the Gunnarskogs Socialdemokratiska Ungdomsklubb (SDUK), helping to bring organized political youth activity to the area for the first time.

His political involvement continued to grow, and he was elected to the Gunnarskog Community Council, where he served from 1950 to 1954.

In 1952, Lovblad attended the Anglo-Scandinavian course at the University of Manchester.

== National politics ==
In 1954, Lovblad was elected to the executive council of the Swedish Social Democratic Youth League (SSU) as a representative of the trade unions. Through this role, he became part of the influential inner circle of Prime Minister Tage Erlander, a group known as the “Erlander boys”, which included future prime ministers Ingvar Carlsson and Olof Palme.At the SSU Congress in 1958, Lovblad took a bold and controversial stance by voicing support for the atomic bomb. His position set him apart from the majority of his peers within the youth movement, many of whom strongly opposed nuclear weapons.

Later that same year, in November 1958, he attended a course in Industrial and Management Engineering at Columbia University’s School of Engineering in New York City. During his brief stay in the United States, he was deeply impressed by the academic atmosphere at Columbia and the intellectual rigor of its lectures. Beyond the classroom, he explored New York, particularly Harlem, where he engaged with local residents and witnessed firsthand the racial and social inequalities still prevalent in American society.

This experience left a profound impact on him. Learning about the legacy of slavery and experiencing the vibrancy and struggle of urban American life, he developed a deep respect for the American labor movement. From that point on, he became a lifelong advocate of its principles, an ideological stance that eventually cost him the support of many leaders within the Scandinavian trade union establishment, who were often more critical of the U.S. model.

Lovblad served as a member of the Swedish National Board of Forestry From 1959 to 1963.

In parallel to his formal political and institutional work, Lovblad was a long-standing member of Bastuligan, an informal socialist think tank that remained active well into the 1990s. The group included several influential figures within Sweden’s Social Democratic movement, including Ingvar Carlsson and Kurt Ward.

== Trade union career ==
His early years working as a lumberjack had a profound impact on his worldview and ultimately led him into trade unionism. He joined the Swedish Woodworkers Union and, in 1960, was appointed its secretary, a role that prompted his move to Gävle. One of the major influences on his thinking during this period was Arne Geijer, then head of the Swedish Trade Union Confederation. Lovblad was a strong proponent of improving social conditions through dialogue and cooperation between labor and employers, rather than through confrontation. He was openly skeptical of the effectiveness of strikes and remained a committed anti-communist throughout his career. His concerns extended beyond workers’ rights to include environmental sustainability and workplace safety, both deeply rooted in his own experiences in the logging industry.

In 1962, he was a candidate to succeed Charles Winroth as president of the Swedish Woodworkers Union, but was ultimately not selected. Shortly afterward, Swedish Prime Minister Tage Erlander gave him 24 hours to decide whether to accept a position in Washington, D.C.

== Diplomatic career ==
In 1963, Lovblad was appointed Labour Attaché at the Swedish Embassy in Washington, D.C. In this role, he traveled extensively across the United States, both to connect with Swedish immigrant communities and to establish relationships with influential American labor leaders such as Jay Lovestone and the first president of the AFL-CIO, George Meany.

Lovblad reported regularly to Sweden on the evolving welfare policies and social developments in the United States. His travels, mostly by car, took him to every U.S. state except Hawaii. He continued to cultivate close relationships with prominent labor figures, including Lane Kirkland, Edward J. Carlough and John Sweeney.

During this period, he resided in Bethesda, Maryland, commuting daily to the Swedish Embassy in Washington, D.C.

== General Secretary of the International Federation of Building and Woodworkers ==
Earlier in his life, Lovblad had attended a congress of the International Federation of Building and Woodworkers (IFBWW) as a guest and was deeply impressed by the organization’s global mission. When the position of General Secretary became vacant following the departure of Arne Hagen, Lovblad decided to apply. Despite being discouraged by Sweden’s Finance Minister Gunnar Sträng, who warned him about the post’s relatively low salary, Lovblad stood by his candidacy. In 1966, at the IFBWW Congress in Oslo, he was elected General Secretary, a role he would hold until 1989.He was re-elected at every subsequent congress: Ostend (13th Congress), Stockholm in 1975 (14th), Vienna in 1978 (15th), Madrid in 1981 (16th), and Geneva in 1985 (17th). Initially, the federation’s headquarters were located at Ewaldsgade in Copenhagen, Denmark. However, due to his frequent travels to Geneva for International Labour Organization (ILO) meetings, he relocated the headquarters to Geneva, Switzerland, first to Rue de la Coulouvrenière near the Rhône River, where it remains today.

Under his leadership, the IFBWW evolved into a global union secretariat, growing to represent 3.5 million members worldwide. Lovblad was a frequent guest at AFL-CIO annual conferences in Florida. In 1982, he served as a guest lecturer at the Congress of the Sheet Metal Workers’ International Association.

Lovblad played a key role in integrating major trade unions from the U.S., including the International Union of Bricklayers and Allied Craftworkers and the International Union of Operating Engineers, as well as trade unions from Japan, Africa, and Latin America. He traveled extensively in Africa and South America, promoting union education and human rights. Notably, he visited countries like Turkey and Chile multiple times, even meeting Turkish Prime Minister Bülent Ecevit in prison. Visiting incarcerated unionists in authoritarian regimes became one of his personal missions.

In 1968, following the Soviet invasion of Czechoslovakia, Lovblad notably challenged the Soviet chairmanship of the ILO’s 8th Session of the Committee on Building, Civil Engineering, and Public Works. Throughout the final years of his tenure, he remained committed to workers’ rights, focusing increasingly on the health impacts of asbestos. In 1988, he organized the IFBWW’s first environmental conference.However, his leadership was not without internal tensions. Friction grew between representatives of the wood and building trades, especially within Sweden, where some in the construction sector resented a woodworker leading their international federation. Additionally, ideological divides between Scandinavian and American unions created further strain. Though deeply Swedish in values and background, Lovblad remained a strong admirer of the American labor model, which alienated some Scandinavian counterparts.

Lovblad stepped down at the 18th Congress in Singapore (December 4–7, 1989), succeeded by Ulf Asp. By the end of his term, he had established regional offices in Kuala Lumpur (Asia-Pacific), Lomé (Africa), and Panama City (Latin America), transforming the IFBWW from a largely Scandinavian institution into a robust international body. While based in Geneva, Lovblad participated annually in the ILO’s International Labour Conference, maintaining a prominent voice in global labor discussions.

In December 2005, the IFBWW merged with the World Federation of Building and Wood Workers (WFBW) to form a new global federation: Building and Wood Workers’ International (BWI), which today represents over 12 million members worldwide.

== International Labour Organization ==
John Lovblad served as Secretary of the Workers’ Group at several key sessions of the International Labour Organization (ILO). He held this position during the first session of the Forestry and Wood Industries Committee, held from September 15 to 18, 1985. He also served in the same role during the 11th Session of the Committee on Building, Civil Engineering, and Public Works in April 1987.

Lovblad represented the International Federation of Building and Wood Workers (IFBWW) at the International Confederation of Free Trade Unions (ICFTU), holding a position on their governing board from 1983 to 1986.

Lovblad served on the governing board of the International Trade Secretariats from 1970 to 1990.

== Personal life ==
In the early 1970s, Swedish journalist Erik Goland produced a documentary on Lovblad titled Ut i världen vill jag (“I Want Out into the World”), chronicling Lovblad’s journey from an uneducated lumberjack to an international labor diplomat.

After a long and intense career that involved over 200 days of travel per year, Lovblad’s pace changed significantly. The events of September 11, 2001, marked a turning point, after which he largely ceased international travel. Having witnessed the fall of the Berlin Wall, he felt his mission was fulfilled, as the Cold War divisions within the global labor movement had abated.

From 1999 to 2005, Lovblad served on the Board of Directors of the Hassan Fathy Institute, now known as the International Construction Institute.

Lovblad was a member of the Vasa Order of America.

On March 21, 1959, John Lovblad married Ingrid Anna-Lisa Johannesson, whom he had met through his work with the Swedish Social Democratic Youth League (SSU). After retiring, he settled in Geneva, where he lived until his passing on January 17, 2016, following complications from a subdural hematoma. Although he spent much of his later life abroad, he remained a Swedish citizen, often stating, “Whatever I did, I did it for my country.” His wife, Ingrid, passed away shortly afterward, on February 20, 2016, due to cardiac failure.
