= International Federation of Building and Wood Workers =

Former global federation of trade unions

Coordinates: 46°11′22″N 6°7′57″E

IFBWW
- International Federation of Building and Wood Workers
- Merged into: Building and Wood Workers International
- Founded: 1 April 1934
- Dissolved: December 9, 2005
- Headquarters: Carouge, Switzerland
- Location: International
- Members: 10 million in 124 countries (2005)
- Affiliations: Global union federation
- Website: ifbww.org

The International Federation of Building and Wood Workers (IFBWW) was a global union federation of trade unions in the building, building materials, wood, forestry and allied industries.

== History ==
The federation was established in 1934 by a merger of the International Federation of Building Workers and International Federation of Wood Workers. The International Secretariat of Stone Masons and the International Secretariat of Painters and Allied Trades later joined the organisation. As of 2005, it had 287 member organisations in 124 countries, representing a combined membership of more than 10 million workers.

The IFBWW was based in Geneva and had a network of regional offices. The organisation worked closely with the International Trade Union Confederation (ITUC) and the other global union federations, and had Special Consultative Status at the Economic and Social Committee of the United Nations.

The IFBWW held a congress every four years, consisting of delegates from the member organisations. The congress established priorities and strategy for the organisation, and elected the Executive Committee. which met immediately before and after the congress, and at the midpoint of the congress period. As supreme governing body during the intercongress period, it was responsible for all policies and operations of the IFBWW. The Executive Committee appointed a Management Committee, which was responsible for the administration of the IFBWW and for the implementation of its policies.

At its congress in Buenos Aires on 9 December 2005 the IFBWW merged with the World Federation of Building and Wood Workers (WFBW) to create a new joint global union federation, the Building and Wood Workers' International.

== Affiliates ==
As of 2005, the following unions were affiliated to the federation:

Union	Abbreviation	Country
Adivasi Forest Wood and Building Workers' Association	AFWBWA	India
Agriculture and Plantation Workers' Union	SAPWU	Swaziland
All Himachal P.W.D. & Irrigation Public Health Worker's Union	AH.PWD & IPH.WU	India
All Indian Building and Construction Workers' Union	AIKTMS	India
All Pakistan Federation of Trade Unions	APFTU	Pakistan
All-Indonesian federation of Wood Forestry and General Workers' Union	DPP FSP Kahutindo	Indonesia
Artisans & General Workers' Union	AGWU	Mauritius
Assam Chah Mazdoor Sangh	ACMS	India
Associated Consulting Engineers	ACEEU	Pakistan
Associated Labor Unions	ALU	Philippines
Association of Construction Worker	AMACOA	Dominican Republic
Association of Trade Unions in the Wood Industry in the Republic of Argentina	USIMRA	Argentina
Autonomer Süd Tiroler Gewerkschaftsbund		Italy
Autonomous Federation of Forestry and Woodworking Industry Workers of Serbia		Serbia
Autonomous Trade Union of Wood and Paper Processing Industry of Croatia		Croatia
Autonomous Union of Road Maintenance Workers of Serbia		Serbia
Azerbaijan Trade Union of Oil and Gas Industry Workers'		Azerbaijan
Bangladesh Building and Wood Workers' Federation	BBWWF	Bangladesh
Bangladesh Sanjukta Building and Wood Workers Federation	BSBWWF	Bangladesh
Barbados Workers' Union	BWU	Barbados
Bermuda Industrial Union	BIU	Bermuda
Bhatha Mazdoor Sabha	BMS	India
Botswana Construction Workers' Union		Botswana
Branch Trade Union of Civil Engineering and IGM Wooden and Road Economy	NEZAVISINOST	Serbia
Bricklayers Union of Argentina	UOLRA	Argentina
Building and Building Materials Workers' Union of Czech Republic	OS STAVBA CR	Czech Republic
Building and Public Works' Union	SPBTP	Djibouti
Building and Public Works Workers' Union		Indonesia
Building and Wood Workers' Secretariat of NSZZ	NSZZ Solidarnosc	Poland
Building, Construction and Allied Workers' Union	BCAWU	South Africa
Building Construction and Timber Workers' Union of Fiji	BCWTWUF	Fiji Islands
Building Workers Union		South Africa
Building, Construction & Timber Industries Employees' Union	BATU	Singapore
Building, Construction, Civil Engineering and Allied Workers' Union	BCCEAWU	Malawi
Building, Industry and Energy		Belgium
Federation of Building, Public Works, Wood, Paper, Ceramic, Quarries and Construction Materials		France
Cambodian Construction Workers' Trade Union Federation	CCTUF	Cambodia
Cement and Lime and Allied Workers' Union		Zimbabwe
Central Committee Union of Building Workers and Construction Materials Industry		Tajikistan
Central Union of Painters, Plumbers, Electro and Construction Workers	CUPPEC	Nepal
Ceylon Mercantile Industrial General Workers' Union	CMU	Sri Lanka
CFTC - BATMAT		France
CGTB	CGTB	Benin
Chemical, Energy, Paper, Printing, Wood and Allied Workers' Union	CEPPWAWU	South Africa
Civil Service Employees' Association	CSEA	Zimbabwe
Civil Service Trade Union	CSTU	Malawi
CLTT	CLTT	Chad
CNV Hout-en Bouwbond		Netherlands
Colombian Federation of Building and Allied Industries	FECCA	Colombia
Confederación Sindical de Trabajadores de la Construcción de Bolivia	CSTCB	Bolivia
Construction and Allied Workers' Union	UECARA	Argentina
Construction and Allied Workers' Union of Lesotho	CAWULE	Lesotho
Construction and Allied Workers' Union of Nepal	CAWUN	Nepal
Construction and Building Materials Industry Workers Union of Serbia	SGIGM	Serbia
Construction and Building Materials Industry Workers' Union of the Russian Federation		Russia
Construction and Building Materials Industry Workers' Union of Ukraine		Ukraine
Construction and Building Materials Workers' Union	CBMWU	Ghana
Construction and Building Materials Workers' Union of Slovak Republic	OZ STAVBA SR	Slovak Republic
Construction and Civil Engineering Senior Staff Association	CCESSA	Nigeria
Construction and Wood Union	B&HB	Netherlands
Construction Industry Trade Union of Croatia	SGH	Croatia
Construction Metal & Furniture Employees Union	CMFEU	Mauritius
Construction Site Workers' General Union	CSGWU	Hong Kong
Construction Trade Union		Finland
Construction Workers of the Republic of Argentina	UOCRA	Argentina
Construction Workers' Union	BMS/CWU	India
Construction, Building Materials, Ceramic and Craft Union	OGB-L	Luxemburg
Construction, Industry and Water Supply Federation	FCIW-PODKREPA	Bulgaria
Construction, Public Works, Wood and Allied Union of Cameroon	FSTBC	Cameroon
Craft Workers' Trade Union	FHF	Faeroe Islands
Croatian Forestry Union	CFU	Croatia
CSC	CSC	Democratic Republic of the Congo
Cyprus Construction Workers' and Miners' Federation	CCWMF	Cyprus
Czecho-Moravian Trade Union of Civilian Employees of the Army		Czech Republic
Danish EL-Federation	DEF	Denmark
Danish Painters' Union	Maler	Denmark
Danish Timber Industry and Construction Workers' Union	TIB	Denmark
Danish Tin and Plumbing Workers' Union	Blik og Rør	Denmark
Danish Union of Metalworkers	Metal	Denmark
Dignité		Côte d'Ivoire
Eastern Railway Construction & Contractor Mazdoor Union	ERCCMU	India
EL & IT Forbundet	EL & IT	Norway
Ethiopian Industrial Federation of Construction, Wood, Metal, Cement & other Trade Unions		Ethiopia
Federaçao Trabalhadores nas Industrias do Vidro, Cristais, Espelhos, Cerámica de Louça, Porcelana e Otica de São Paulo	FETIVICO	Brazil
Federación de los trabajadores de la construcción, madera y afines	USO - FTCMIA	Spain
Federación Ecuatoriana de Operadores y Mecánicos de Equipo Caminero	FEDESOMEC	Ecuador
Federacion Nacional de sindicatos de trabajadores eventuales o transitorios de Chile "Eduardo Miño Perez"	FNSTETC	Chile
Federación Nacional de trabajadores de la Construcción y la Madera	FETRACOM	Dominican Republic
Federación Obrera Ceramista de la República de Argentina	FOCRA	Argentina
Federación Regional de Sindicatos de Trabajadores Forestales, Construcción, Madera y Servicios Generales	FESITRAFORMA	Chile
Fédération chrétienne des travailleurs de l'industrie	Fekrini	Madagascar
Fédération des travailleurs du bois et de la construction du Togo	FTBC	Togo
Fédération libre bâtiments, travaux publics et bois		Gabon
Federation Light Industry	PODKREPA	Bulgaria
Fédération nationale des syndicats des routes départementales - CSDR	FNSDJ	Romania
Fédération nationale des syndicats des travailleurs du bois et de la construction du Cameroun		Cameroon
Federation of Building and Wood		Tunisia
Federation of Building and Wood Workers	FTBB	Democratic Republic of the Congo
Federation of Building and Wood Workers of Faso	FTBBF	Burkina Faso
Federation of Building and Wood Workers of Greece		Greece
Federation of Building and Wood Workers of Nicaragua	FITCM-N	Nicaragua
Federation of Building, Wood and Building Industry Workers' Unions	EFEDOSZSZ	Hungary
Federation of cement workers' unions of Romania	FSCR	Romania
Federation of Construction and Wood Workers from Paraguay	FETRACOMP	Paraguay
Federation of Construction, Informal and General Workers	F-KUI	Indonesia
Federation of Forest and Wood Workers' Trade Unions		Lithuania
Federation of Free Trade Unions in the Wood Industry	FSLIL	Romania
Federation of Heavy Machinery Workers	FETRAMAQUIPES	Venezuela
Federation of Independent Construction Trade Unions	CITUB	Bulgaria
Federation of Independent Trade Unions of Building and Wood Industry		Macedonia
Federation of Korean United Workers' Unions	FKUWU	Korea
Federation of Land Reclamation and Agriculture Structures Unions	FSIFCA	Romania
Federation of Trade Union Organizations in Forestry and Wood Processing Industries		Bulgaria
Federation of Trade Unions Construction Workers' Unions of Mongolia		Mongolia
Federation of Transport, Energy, Building, Wood, Chemistry and Communication	ELA-Hainbat	Spain
Federation of Wood, Forestry, Environment and Natural Resources Workers of Guatemala	FESITRASMMAR	Guatemala
Federation of Workers in Construction and Furniture Industries of the State of Rio do Sul	FETICOM-RS	Brazil
Federation of Workers in the Building, Wood and Allied Industries	FETRACONSTRUCCION	Venezuela
Federation of Workers in the Construction and Furniture Industries of the State of São Paulo	FETICOM-SP	Brazil
Federation of Workers in the Steel, Electricity and Mechanical Engineering Industries in Colombia	FETRAMECOL	Colombia
Fédération syndicale de construction et bâtiment	FESCOBA	Central African Republic
FIB-NTU Promyana		Bulgaria
FIBW - Alliance Promyana		Bulgaria
Fiji Electricity and Allied Workers' Union	FEAWU	Fiji Islands
Finnish Electrical Workers' Union		Finland
Forestry Branch Trade Union of Latvia	LMNA	Latvia
Forestry Sector in the State of Maharashtra	VKS	India
Forestry Trade Union of Ukraine		Ukraine
Forestry, wood and agriculture sectors		Indonesia
General Agricultural Workers' Union	GAWU	Ghana
General Agriculture and Plantation Workers' Union of Zimbabwe	GAPWUZ	Zimbabwe
General Construction Workers' Union		Sierra Leone
General Trade Union for Building and Wood Industries Workers	GTUBWW	Egypt
General Trade Union of Building and Wood Workers	GTUBWW	Yemen
General Trade Union of Construction Workers in Jordan	GTUCW	Jordan
General Workers' Union, Metal and Construction Section	GWU	Malta
GMB (Construction, Furniture, Timber and Allied Section)	GMB-CFTA	United Kingdom
German Metalworkers' Union	IG Metall	Germany
Government Servants' Association	GSA	Mauritius
Gujarat Forest Produces Gatherers and Forest Workers' Union	GFPGFWU	India
Guyana Labour Union	GLU	Guyana
Icelandic Electrical Workers' Union	RSI	Iceland
Independent Syndicate of Makedonijapat public service employees - Skopje		Macedonia
Independent Trade Union Federation of Building and Raw Materials Industry	SINDICONS	Moldova
Independent Trade Union of Building and Construction Materials Industry in Bosnia Herzegovina		Bosnia and Herzegovina
Independent Trade Union of Forestry, Wood and Paper Processing in Bosnia and Herzegovina		Bosnia and Herzegovina
Independent Trade Union of Georgian Architects and Workers of Construction and Building Materials Industry		Georgia
Independent Trade Union of Workers in Forestry and Wood Processing of Montenegro		Montenegro
Independent Union of Building Complex Workers of Azerbaijan		Azerbaijan
Indian Farm Labourers Union	HKMP	India
Indian National Building, Construction, Forest and Wood Workers' Federation	INBFCWF	India
Indian National Rural Labour Federation, Tamil Nadu	INRLF	India
International Association of Machinists and Aerospace Workers	IAMAW	United States
International Brotherhood of Teamsters	IBT	United States
International Union of Painters and Allied Trades	IUPAT	United States
Italian Federation of Construction and Allied Workers	FILCA-CISL	Italy
Italian Federation of Wood, Building and Allied Workers	FILLEA-CGIL	Italy
Japan Construction Trade Union Confederation	KENSETSU-RENGO	Japan
Japanese Federation of Forest and Wood Workers' Union	SINRIN ROREN	Japan
Japanese Federation of Chemical, Service and General Trade Unions	CSG RENGO	Japan
Japanese Federation of Textile, Chemical, Commercial, Service, Food and General Workers' Unions	UI ZENSEN	Japan
Kenya Building, Construction, Timber, Furniture and Allied Industries Employees Union		Kenya
Kenya Quarry and Mine Workers' Union	KQMWU	Kenya
Kenya Union of Printing, Publishing, Paper Manufacturing and Allied Workers		Kenya
Kerala Building Construction Workers' Congress	KKNTC	India
Korean Federation of Construction Industry Trade Unions	KFCITU	Korea
General Union	AC	Belgium
Laborers' International Union of North America	LIUNA	United States
LANV	LANV	Luxemburg
Latvian Builders Trade Union	LCA	Latvia
Lithuanian Building Workers' Trade Union		Lithuania
Local Government Employees Association	LGEA	Mauritius
Maharashtra Construction and Wood Workers' Union	MBLKS	India
Malayan Technical Services Union	MTSU	Malaysia
Meghacity Unorganized Workers' Union	MAMU	India
Metal & Allied Namibian Workers' Union	MANWU	Namibia
Metal, Construction and Allied Workers of UGT	MCA-UGT	Spain
Mixer Truck Drivers Association	MTDA	Hong Kong
Mongolian Industry Trade Union's Federation		Mongolia
National Confederation of Building Workers and Associated Trade Unions		Hungary
National Confederation of Construction and Wood Industry Workers	CONTICOM-CUT	Brazil
National Confederation of Forestry Workers	CTF	Chile
National Construction and Services Union of Guatemala	SINCS-G	Guatemala
National Construction Building & Allied Workers Union	SABAWO - CONSAWU	South Africa
National Construction Union	SYNACO	Senegal
National Distribution Union	NDU	New Zealand
National du bois et du bâtiment de Centre Afrique	SYNABOBACA	Central African Republic
National Estates Services Union	NESU	Sri Lanka
National Federation of Building and Forestry Workers	FNTCS	Burkina Faso
National Federation of Building and Wood Workers	FNTBB	Democratic Republic of the Congo
National Federation of Building, Public Works and Wood	SYNABAT	Guinea
National Federation of Building, Public Works, Mining, Energy, Fuel and Allied Workers	FENATRABAT	Chad
National Federation of Building, Wood and Related Workers	FENEAL-UIL	Italy
National Federation of Chinese Construction Workers' Union	NFCCWU	Taiwan
National Federation of Construction and Wood Workers in Panama	FENATRACOMAP	Panama
National Federation of Construction, Materials, Wood and Cork		Algeria
National Federation of Construction, Wood and Allied Workers	FECOMA-CC.OO.	Spain
National Federation of Labor	NFL	Philippines
National Federation of Salaried Workers in Construction and Wood Industries	FNCB (CFDT)	France
National Federation of Trade Union Workers in Public Works, Building and Allied	FNSTTPBACI	Côte d'Ivoire
National Federation of Wood, Forestry and Allied Industries of Cameroon	FENSYTEIFCAM	Cameroon
National Federation of Workers in Construction, Wood, Services and Allied Sectors	FETRACOMA	Chile
National Federation of Workers in the Construction, Wood and Construction Materials Industries	FENTICOMMC	Dominican Republic
National Federation of Workers in the Wood Industry	FENATIMAP	Peru
National Forestry Workers' Union of Japan	NICHIRINRO	Japan
National Timber, Wood, Construction and Allied Workers' Union of Liberia	NTWCAWU	Liberia
National Trade Union of Building Materials, Wood and Allied Workers	SNIMCMA	Angola
National Trade Union of Building, Wood and Building Materials Industry of Mali	FENIBABCOM	Mali
National Trade Union of Building, Wood and Road Construction Workers of Niger	SYNBBAROUTES	Niger
National Trade Union of Carpenters, Bricklayers and Allied Trade Unions	SNSCAASC	Nicaragua
National Trade Union of Civil Engineering		Mauritania
National Trade Union of Farm and Forestry Workers	SINTAF	Mozambique
National Trade Union of Workers in Civil Construction, Wood and Mining Industries	SINTICIM	Mozambique
National Trade Union of Workers in the Ceramic, Cement, Glass and Allied Industries	SINTICAVS	Portugal
National Trade Unions of Public Service & Allied Workers	NTUPAW	Liberia
National Union of Building & Wood Workers	NUBWW	Palestine
National Union of Building and Construction Workers	NUBCW	Philippines
National Union of Building and Wood Workers	SNTBB	Morocco
National Union of Building Workers, Wood and Public & Private Works of Senegal	SNTBBTPP	Senegal
National Union of Building, Engineering and General Workers	NUBEGW	Zambia
National Union of Building, Wood, Ceramic and Glass Workers	NUBWW	Israel
National Union of Civil Engineering, Construction, Furniture and Wood Workers	NUCECFWW	Nigeria
National Union of General Workers	ZENKOKU-IPPAN	Japan
National Union of Mineworkers	NUM	South Africa
National Union of Public Works	SYNTRAGAVO	Togo
National Union of Public Works and Transport Workers	UNATROPYT	Costa Rica
National Union of Workers in Private Enterprises, Building, Public Works, Roads and Allied Industries	SYNBARCOT	Togo
National Union of Workers in Wood, General Mechanical Engineering of Ivory Coast	SNTIBMGCI	Côte d'Ivoire
National Workers Congress		Sri Lanka
National Workers' Union		Seychelles
Nepal Building Construction Workers Union	NBCWU	Nepal
Furniture, Manufacturing & Associated Workers' Union	NZ FMAWU	New Zealand
Nikhila Orissa Bidyut Sramik Mahasangha	NOBSM	India
Nirman Mazdoor Panchayat Sangam	NMPS	India
Northern Amalgamated Workers Union	AWUNZ	New Zealand
Norwegian General Workers' Union	NAF	Norway
Norwegian United Federation of Trade Unions		Norway
Norwegian Wood Workers' Union	NTAF	Norway
NPSM	NPSM	Namibia
Orissa Forest and Minor Forest Produce Workers' Union	OFMFPWU	India
Orissa Kendupatra Karamchari Sangha	OKKS	India
Pakistan Construction Federation		Pakistan
Pakistan Federation of Building and Wood Workers	PFBWW	Pakistan
Palamoori Contract Labour Union	PCLU	India
PNG Timber & Construction Workers' union		Papua New Guinea
Professional, Technician and Administrative Workers in the Wood and Allied Industries	SUNTIMAVEN	Venezuela
Public Services Workers' Union	PSWU	Ghana
Public Utility Workers' Union	PUWU	Ghana
Romanian Federation of Forest and Furniture Workers	FSFMR	Romania
Rural Labour Association	RLA	India
Rural Workers' Organisation	RWO	India
Russian Oil, Gas and Construction Workers' Union	ROGWU	Russia
Sabah Timber Industry Employees Union	STIEU	Malaysia
Samidn, Samband Idnfélaga		Iceland
Self Employed Women's Association	SEWA	India
SIPTU	SIPTU	Ireland
Sheet Metal Workers' International Association	SMWIA	United States
Shevaroy General Employees Union	SGEU	India
SILVA Trade Union Federation	SILVA	Romania
Sindicato de Trabajadores de Ceramica Cordillera		Chile
Sindicato de Trabajadores de la Empresa Aguas de San Pedro	SINTRAASPE	Honduras
Sindicato de Trabajadores de Pizano	SINTRAPIZANO	Colombia
Sindicato de Trabajadores de Vialidades del Estado de Trujillo	STV	Venezuela
Sindicato dos Trabalhadores nas Industrias Fabricantes de Peçes e Pre-Fabricados em Concreto de São Paulo	SINDRESP	Brazil
Sindicato Gremial de Maestros de Obra de la Construcción y de Ocupaciones Similares	SIGMOOS	El Salvador
Sindicato Intermunicipal dos Trabalhadores nas Indústrias da Construção e do Mobilario "Solidariedade" de São Paulo		Brazil
Sindicato Nacional de Operadores de Máquinas Pesades	SINOMAPE	Dominican Republic
Sindicato Nacional de Trabajadores de las Industrias de la Construcción, Madera y Afines	SINTRAICMA	Paraguay
Sindicato Unico de Trabajadores de la Construcción del Estado de Lara	SUTICEL	Venezuela
Sindicato Unitario Nacional de Trabajadores de la Construcción y Similares	SUNTRACS	Costa Rica
Sindikat Delavcev Gradbenih Dejavnosti Slovenije	SDGD	Slovenia
Sindikato di Empleadonan den Bibienda	SEBI	Curaçao
Skilled and Manual Productive Workers' Union		Sierra Leone
Slovak Trade Union of Workers in Wood Working, Furniture and Paper Industries, in Forests and Management of Water Supplies	OZ DLV	Slovak Republic
Solomon Islands National Union of Workers	SINUW	Solomon Islands
South African Agricultural Plantation and Allied Workers' Union	SAAPAWU	South Africa
Southern Philippines Federation of Labour	SPFL	Philippines
Starfsgreinasamband Islands	SGS	Iceland
Swedish Building Workers' Union	BYGGNADS	Sweden
Swedish Electricians' Union	SEF	Sweden
Swedish Forest and Wood Workers' Union		Sweden
Swedish Painters' Union		Sweden
Swedish Union for Service and Communication Employees	SEKO	Sweden
Swedish Union of Clerical and Technical Employees in Industry	Sif	Sweden
SYNA	SYNA	Switzerland
Syndical national des travailleurs du bâtiment et du bois	SNTBC	Senegal
Syndicat national des travailleurs du bois et du bâtiment	SNTBB	Burkina Faso
Taiwan Mopan Workers' Federation	TMWF	Taiwan
Tamil Nadu State Construction Workers' Union	TMKTS	India
Tanzania Mines and Construction Workers' Union	TAMICO	Tanzania
Teamsters Canada		Canada
The Employees Syndicate of the Ministry of Public Works and Public Authority for Agriculture and Fish Resources		Kuwait
The General Union Federation FAMILIA	FGS Familia	Romania
The Kyrgyzstan Forestry and Wood Workers' Trade Union		Kyrgyzstan
The Kyrgyzstan Trade Union of Building and Construction Workers		Kyrgyzstan
The Syndicate of the Ministry of Public Works		Kuwait
Timber and Related Industries Workers' Union		Russia
Timber and Woodworkers' Union	TWU	Ghana
Timber Employees' Union Peninsular Malaysia	KPPPSM	Malaysia
Trade Federation of Wood, Pulp, Paper and Construction materials - Federation of Free Workers		Philippines
Trade Union Federation of Building Wood and Public Services of Albania	FSNDSH	Albania
Trade Union for Building, Forestry, Agriculture and Environment	IG BAU	Germany
Trade Union of Agents in Public Works in Housing and Transport	SUATP/HT	Niger
Trade Union of Civil Engineering, Construction Materials Industry and Projection of the Republic of Macedonia		Macedonia
Trade Union of Construction and Building Materials Employees of the Republic of Kazakhstan		Kazakhstan
Trade Union of Estonian Forest Industry Workers	EMT	Estonia
Trade Union of National Construction Industry and Allied Workers of Honduras	STINCAH	Honduras
Trade Union of Technical Employees in Civil Construction, Public Works and Allied Industries	SETACCOP	Portugal
Trade Union of the Workers of Ecology and Natural Resources of Azerbaijan	TUWENRA	Azerbaijan
Trade Union of Workers in Forestry and Wood Industries in the Republic of Macedonia		Macedonia
Transport and General Workers' Union	TGWU	United Kingdom
Tropik Wood Employees and Allied Workers' Union	TWEAWU	Fiji Islands
Turkish Cement, Pottery and Glass Workers' Union	CIMSE-IS	Turkey
Turkish Forestry Workers' Union	ORMAN-IS	Turkey
Turkish Union of Road, Construction and Building Workers	YOL-IS	Turkey
Turkish Wood Workers' Union	AGAÇ-IS	Turkey
Uganda Building Construction, Civil Engineering, Cement & Allied Workers' Union	UBCCECAWU	Uganda
Unia	Unia	Switzerland
Union of Commercial and Clerical Employees in Denmark	HK/Industri	Denmark
Union of Construction and Woodworkers	GBH	Austria
Union of Construction, Allied Trades and Technicians	UCATT	United Kingdom
Union of Employees in Construction Industry	UECI	Malaysia
Union of Forestry Employees Sarawak	UFES	Malaysia
Union of Polish Foresters	ZLP w RP	Poland
Union of Salaried Employees		Finland
Union of Tile, Mosaic, Granite, Faience Layers and Polishers	SOCAMGLYP	Argentina
Union of Workers in the Construction and Allied Industries	SOICSCES	El Salvador
United Federation of Danish Workers	3F	Denmark
United Front for Rural, Plantation and Construction Workers	UNIFRONT	India
United Steelworkers - IWA Council	USWA	Canada
Uttar Pradesh Gramin Mazdoor Sangthan	UPGMS	India
Uttar Pradesh Sarvazanik Nirman Vibhag (P.W.D.) Majdoor Sabha	UPSNVPWD MS	India
Uzbekistan Construction and Building Materials Workers' Trade Union		Uzbekistan
Wood and Allied Workers' Union		Finland
Wood, Forestry and Water Industries' Workers Union of Czech Republic	OS DLV	Czech Republic
Zimbabwe Construction and Allied Trades Workers' Union	ZCATWU	Zimbabwe
Zimbabwe Electricity and Energy Workers' Union	ZEEWU	Zimbabwe
Zimbabwe Furniture, Timber and Allied Trades Union	ZFTATU	Zimbabwe
Zwiazek Zawodowy Budowlani	ZZ Budowlani	Poland

== Leadership ==
=== General Secretaries ===
1934: Jaap van Achterbergh
1948: Jan Leliveld
1951: Arne Hagen
1966: John Löfblad
1989: Ulf Asp
2001: Anita Normark

=== Presidents ===
1934: Richard Coppock
1960: Dore Smets
1966: James H. Mills
1969: Bram Buijs
1985: Konrad Carl
1993: Bruno Köbele
1997: Roel De Vries
