= Per-Olof Sjöö =

Swedish trade union leader (born 1968)

Per-Olof Sjöö (born 1968) is a Swedish trade union leader.

Sjöö worked as a fitter in a window factory near Växjö, and joined the Swedish Forest and Wood Workers' Union. In 2000, he became the union's contract secretary. In 2009, the union merged into the new GS, and Sjöö was elected as its first president. In 2012, he was additionally appointed as chair of the Swedish Trade Union Confederation (LO) Union to Union international solidarity campaign, serving until 2016.

Sjöö's international work soon attracted attention, and in particular he helped workers at the IKEA plant in Danville, Virginia to unionise. For this, he was the first non-American to receive the American Rights at Work's Eleanor Roosevelt Human Rights Award. In 2013, he was elected as president of the Building and Wood Workers' International. In 2015, he was awarded the Swedish Development Forum Prize. He also served on the board of LO. He lives in a union-owned apartment in central Stockholm.

Trade union offices
Preceded by New position	President of GS; 2009–present	Succeeded by Incumbent
Preceded by Klaus Wiesehügel	President of the Building and Wood Workers' International; 2013–present	Succeeded by Incumbent
