= National Union of General Workers =

The National Union of General Workers is the name of:

- National Union of General Workers (Sohyo), a former trade union in Japan
- National Union of General Workers (Zenrokyo), a trade union in Japan
- National Union of General Workers (UK), a former trade union in the UK
- Zenroren National Union of General Workers, a trade union in Japan
