= Roel de Vries (trade unionist) =

Roel de Vries (born 1943) is a former Dutch trade union leader.

Born in Steenwijk, de Vries became a carpenter, and joined the General Industrial Union of Cabinetmakers and Woodworkers, becoming a leading figure in its youth work. In 1967, he moved to Amsterdam to become an administrator for the union, which in 1970 became part of the General Dutch Union of Building and Wood Industries. He was steadily promoted, becoming district administrator in Goes, and then winning election to the union's executive in 1980.

In 1982, de Vries' union became part of the new Construction and Wood Union. He was elected as its vice-president in 1986, in which role he successfully negotiated a new collective agreement for the construction industry. In 1993, he became president. As leader of the union, he decided to encourage a move towards more flexibility, with individual rather than collective agreements. He retired in 2003.

In 1997, de Vries was elected as the president of the International Federation of Building and Wood Workers (IFBWW), in which role he campaigned against child labour in the construction industry in poorer countries. He also championed the merger of the IFBWW with the World Federation of Building and Wood Workers. This occurred in 2005, forming the Building and Wood Workers' International, at which point he stood down.

Trade union offices
Preceded by Jan Schuller	President of the Construction and Wood Union; 1993–2003	Succeeded by Dick van Haaster
Preceded by Bruno Köbele	President of the International Federation of Building and Wood Workers; 1997–2005	Succeeded by Federation merged
