= Arvid Thorberg =

Swedish trade union organizer

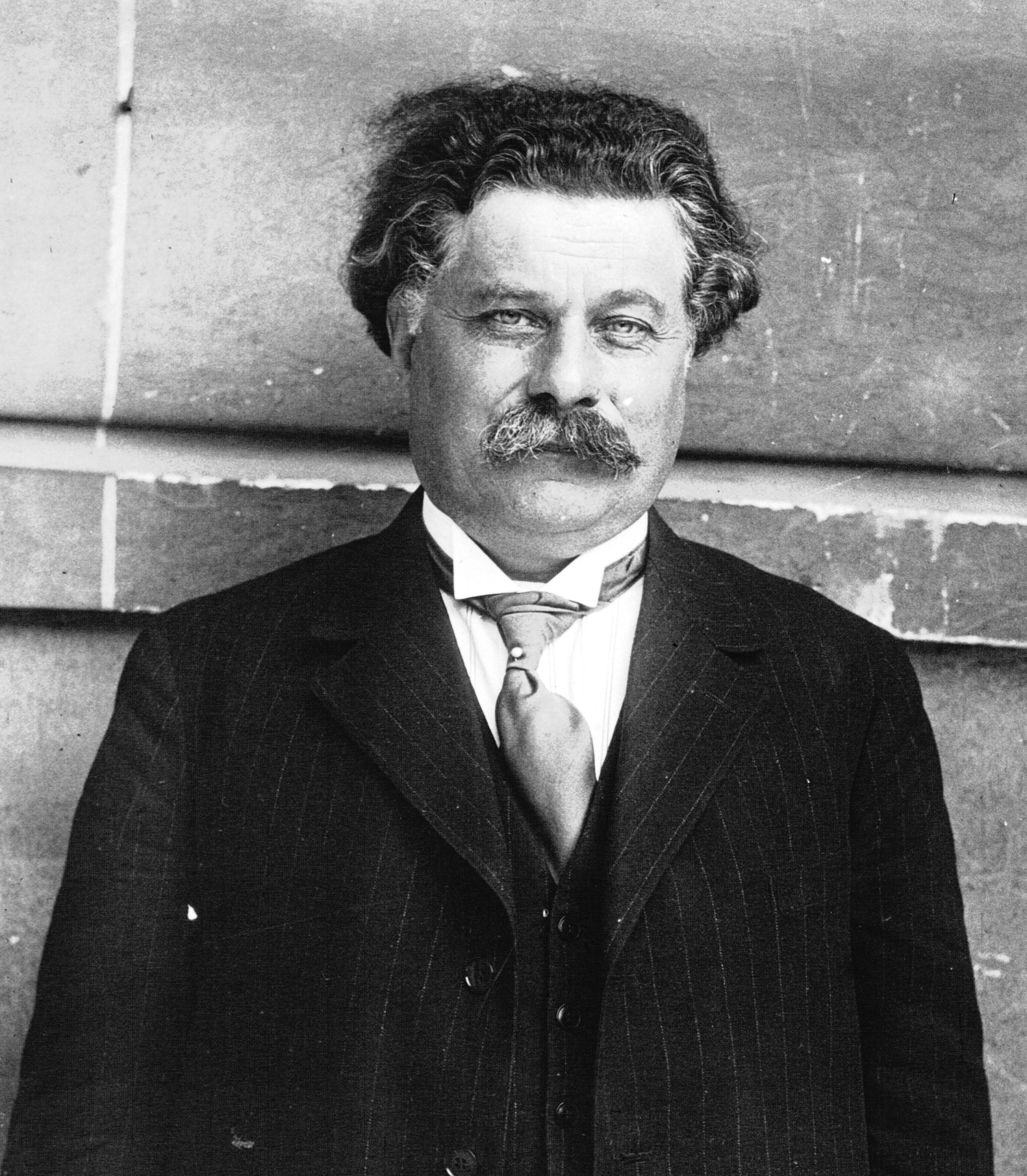
Arvid Thorberg in 1927

Arvid Thorberg (born 1877, Kärrbo, d. 1930) was a Swedish trade union organizer. By profession he was a carpenter, and belonged to the Swedish Wood Workers' Union. He was the chairman of the Swedish Trade Union Confederation, commonly referred to as LO, from 1920-1930. As LO chairman, he took over from Herman Lindqvist in 1920 and was succeeded by Edvard Johanson in 1936.
