= Herman Lindqvist =

Herman Lindqvist may refer to:

- Herman Lindqvist (politician) (1863–1932), Swedish Social Democratic politician and trade union organizer
- Herman Lindqvist (journalist) (born 1943), Swedish journalist and author
