= Bert Lundin =

Swedish union leader (1921–2018)

Bert Lundin (29 April 1921 – 3 February 2018) was a Swedish union leader who led the Swedish Metalworkers' Union, at the time the largest member organization of the Swedish Trade Union Confederation, from 1972 to 1981. He also had leadership positions in the International Metalworkers' Federation and at the Swedish Labour Movement's International Center.

== Early life and education ==
Born into a working-class family in Lysekil, Western Sweden, Lundin left school at 13 and started work at a small workshop for repairs and soon after at Skandiaverken, a mechanical factory where his father already worked.

== Career ==
At the factory he became in involved in union work and also got engaged in the Swedish Social Democratic Youth League. 25 years old he was elected to Lysekil municipality council. He left the factory work when he got employed with the Metalworkers' Union in Stockholm in 1952. In 1958 he became secretary in charge of negotiating wages and working conditions in the metal industry around the country. He focused on lifting the lower wages. In 1969 he became deputy leader of the Metalworkers' Union and in 1972 he replaced Åke Nilsson as leader of the organization.

A dedicated socialist, Lundin at the conference of the Swedish Trade Union Confederation in 1976, advocated for a more radical version of employee funds for collective ownership of companies than Rudolf Meidner had proposed.

As deputy leader and leader of the largest union within the Swedish Trade Union Confederation he had significant political influence through the union's close relationship with the Swedish Social Democratic Party. He was a member of the executive board (verkställande utskott) of the Social Democratic Party from 1975 to 1984.

In the 1970s, he described the political process thus: "With politics it often starts with a proposal in the Metalworker's Union. Then it goes to the Trade Union Confederation and then the demand goes to the [Social Democratic] party. Then hopefully the general opinion is raised and lastly Sträng needs to be convinced. And he needs to get the people with him. Yes, it takes time. Ten years, maybe fifteen. So is politics."

=== International engagement ===
During the military dictatorship of Chile (1973–90), several Chilean union activists fled to Sweden and Lundin as leader of Swedish Metal became actively involved in support of the Chilean opposition.

He also served in the International Metalworkers' Federation and travelled in that capacity in Latin America in the early 1970s. After he left the leadership position of Metalworkers' Union, he led the Labour Movement's International Center, today Olof Palme International Center and in that capacity he continued to work with the Chilean opposition, including later president Ricardo Lagos. In 2016, he received the Order of Bernardo O'Higgins, the highest Chilean civilian order to a foreign citizen.

== Later life and death ==
In his older days, he was involved with the metalworker's building at Skansen museum where he organized study circles. He co-wrote an autobiography Ett liv i Metall (A life in metal) with Rolf Jansson which was published in 2006. He died on 3 February 2018, aged 96.

Trade union offices
Preceded by Åke Nilsson	General Secretary of the Swedish Metalworkers' Union; 1971–1982	Succeeded by Leif Blomberg
