= Swedish Building Wood Workers' Union =

Trade union in Sweden

The Swedish Building Wood Workers' Union (Swedish: Svenska Byggnadsträarbetareförbundet, Btaf) was a trade union representing carpenters in Sweden.

The first union of the name was founded in 1904, as a split from the Swedish Wood Workers' Union, but it rejoined in 1916. On 1 January 1924, the Wood Workers' Union was split into the Swedish Wood Industry Workers' Union and a new Btaf. Like its predecessor, it affiliated to the Swedish Trade Union Confederation. In 1925, the small Swedish Parquet Layers' Union joined Btaf.

On foundation, the union had 11,212 members, but it grew steadily, and by 1948 had 42,673 members. In 1949, it merged with parts of several other unions, to form the Swedish Building Workers' Union.

== Presidents ==
1924: Nils Linde
1942: John Grewin
