= GS (Swedish union) =

Trade union in Sweden

- GS - Facket för skogs-, trä- och grafisk bransch
- Founded: 2009
- Merger of: Swedish Forest and Wood Workers' Union & Swedish Graphic Workers' Union
- Type: Trade union
- Headquarters: Stockholm, Sweden
- Location: Sweden
- Members: 65,000
- Key people: Per-Olof Sjöö, president
- Affiliations: LO
- Website: www.gsfacket.se

GS is a trade union in Sweden representing workers in the media, forestry and woodworking industries.

== History ==
The union was established on 1 June 2009 through the merging of Swedish Forest and Wood Workers' Union and Swedish Graphic Workers' Union. Like both its predecessors, it affiliated to the Swedish Trade Union Confederation. The merger was originally conceived by the Swedish Paper Workers' Union, but that union ultimately decided to remain independent.

On formation, the union had 52,845 members, but the number has fallen in line with employment in the industries it covers. By 2019, the union had 37,583 members.
