= Marie Nilsson =

Swedish trade unionist (born 1964)

Marie Nilsson (born 20 February 1964) is a Swedish trade union leader.

Born in Stenungsund, in 1982, Nilsson became a technician for the chemical company Borealis. She was elected to the board of the Swedish Industrial Union in 2000. This became part of IF Metall in 2006, and Nilsson remained on the board. She was elected as vice-president of the union in 2012, for the first time becoming a full-time trade union official. She was subsequently elected to the board of the Swedish Social Democratic Party.

In 2017, Nilsson was elected as president of IF Metall, the first woman to hold the post. She came to international notice in leading a dispute with Elon Musk and Tesla, Inc. over the role of unions in the Swedish economic model. In 2023, she won election as president of the IndustriALL Global Union, becoming the first women in the post.

Trade union offices
Preceded by Anders Ferbe	Vice President of IF Metall; 2012–2017	Succeeded by Tomas With
Preceded by Anders Ferbe	President of IF Metall; 2017–present	Succeeded by Incumbent
Preceded by Jörg Hofmann	President of the IndustriALL Global Union; 2023–present	Succeeded by Incumbent
