= United Unions =

Trade union in Sweden

The United Unions (Swedish: De Förenade Förbunden, DFF) was a general union in Sweden.

The union was founded in 1905, when the Chemical Technical and Mill Industry Union merged with the Swedish Leather Workers' Union. Like its predecessors, it affiliated to the Swedish Trade Union Confederation. It had 1,586 members on formation, and in 1907 was joined by both the Fur Workers' Union and the Swedish Glove Workers' Union, but the two broke away in the 1910s. Despite this, membership grew, with the Washing and Ironing Staff Union of Stockholm joining in 1917, and the Glove Workers rejoining in 1920.

Membership peaked at 15,337 in 1953, then declined slightly, to 14,927 in 1961. The following year, the union was dissolved, with the majority of members transferring to the Swedish Factory Workers' Union, while those in the leather industry joined the Swedish Shoe and Leather Workers' Union, and a small group joined the Swedish Paper Workers' Union.
