= IF Metall =

Trade union in Sweden

- Predecessor: Swedish Industrial Union and Swedish Metalworkers' Union
- Founded: 1 January 2006
- Headquarters: Olof Palmes gata 11, Stockholm, Sweden
- Location: Sweden
- Members: 241,951
- Key people: Marie Nilsson
- Affiliations: LO, IndustriALL
- Website: www.ifmetall.se

Industrifacket Metall (IF Metall) is a trade union in Sweden. It was formed in a 2006 merger between the Swedish Industrial Union (Industrifacket) and the Swedish Metalworkers' Union (Metall). Its roots in Metall trace back to 1888.

IF Metall has a membership density of 80%. On formation, it had 337,712 members, but this fell steadily, to 241,951 in 2019. IF Metall represents workers in around 11,500 workplaces. 21% of its members are women, and 15% are under 30 years of age, employed in a variety of sectors, including:

- mechanical engineering and the plastics industry
- the building material industry
- the mining sector
- the ironworks sector
- the textile industry, including clothing
- automobile repair shops
- disabled workers doing similar tasks within government-sponsored projects, including Samhall

IF Metall is the second-largest affiliate of the Swedish Trade Union Confederation. On 4 December 2020, PTK, Kommunal, IF Metall and the Confederation of Swedish Enterprise (SN) signed a new main agreement on changes to employment protection (severance rules, etc.) and expanded opportunities for skills development and retraining.

== List of chairmen ==
- Stefan Löfven, 2006–2012
- Anders Ferbe, 2012–2017
- Marie Nilsson, 2017–present

== Tesla strike ==
Mechanics affiliated with IF Metall initiated a strike against TM Sweden, a Tesla vehicle service subsidiary, on October 27, 2023, over the company's refusal to sign a collective agreement. The dispute ended on August 19, 2026, after 1,027 days, making it Sweden's longest strike in modern history. Concluding without Tesla signing the agreement after the company bought out the remaining striking workers.
