= Edvard Johanson =

Swedish trade union organizer

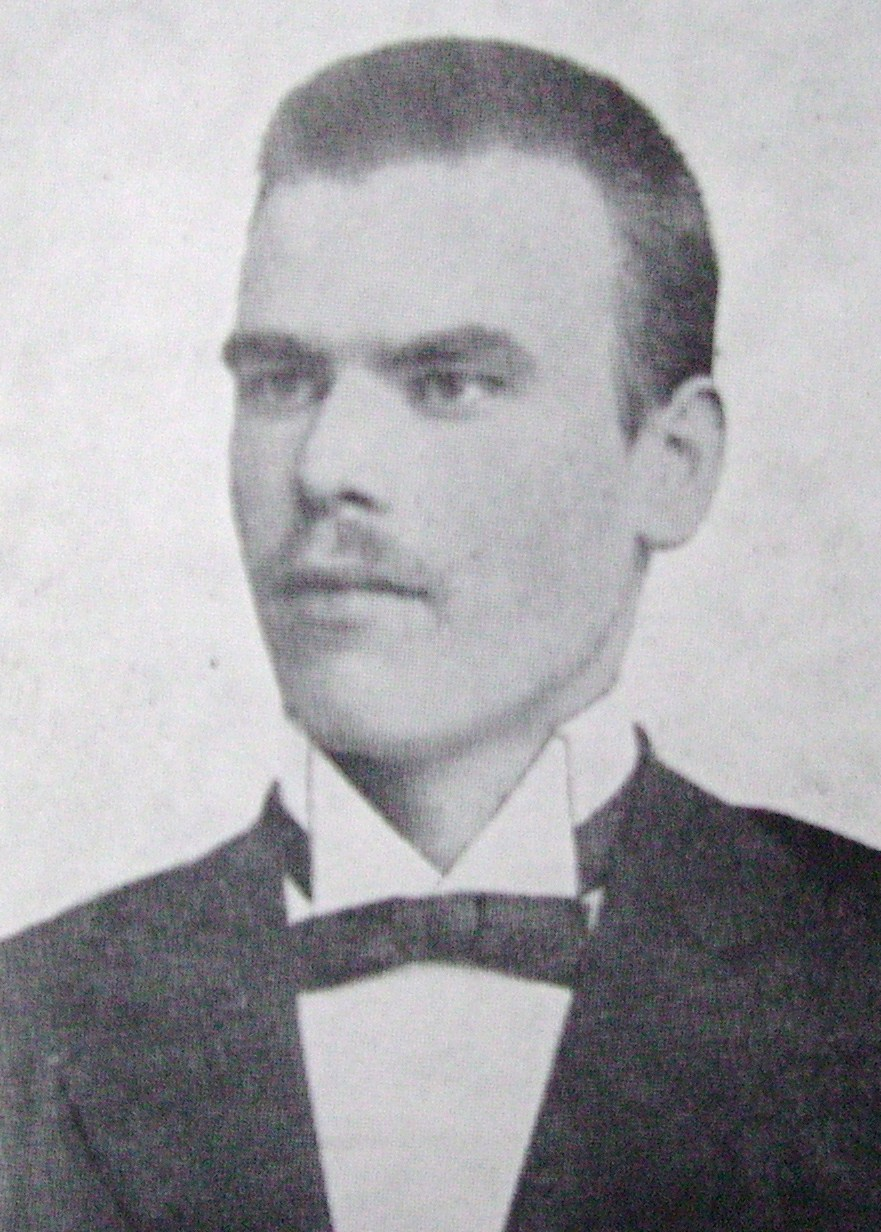
Karl Edvard

Karl Edvard Johanson (1882 in Förlösa – 1936) was a Swedish trade union organizer. By profession he was a shoemaker, and belonged to the Swedish Shoe and Leather Workers' Union. He was the chairman of the Swedish Trade Union Confederation from 1930, when he succeeded Albert Forslund, to 1936, the year of his death when he was succeeded by Arvid Thorberg.
