= Gunnar Andersson (trade unionist) =

Swedish trade unionist (1890–1946)

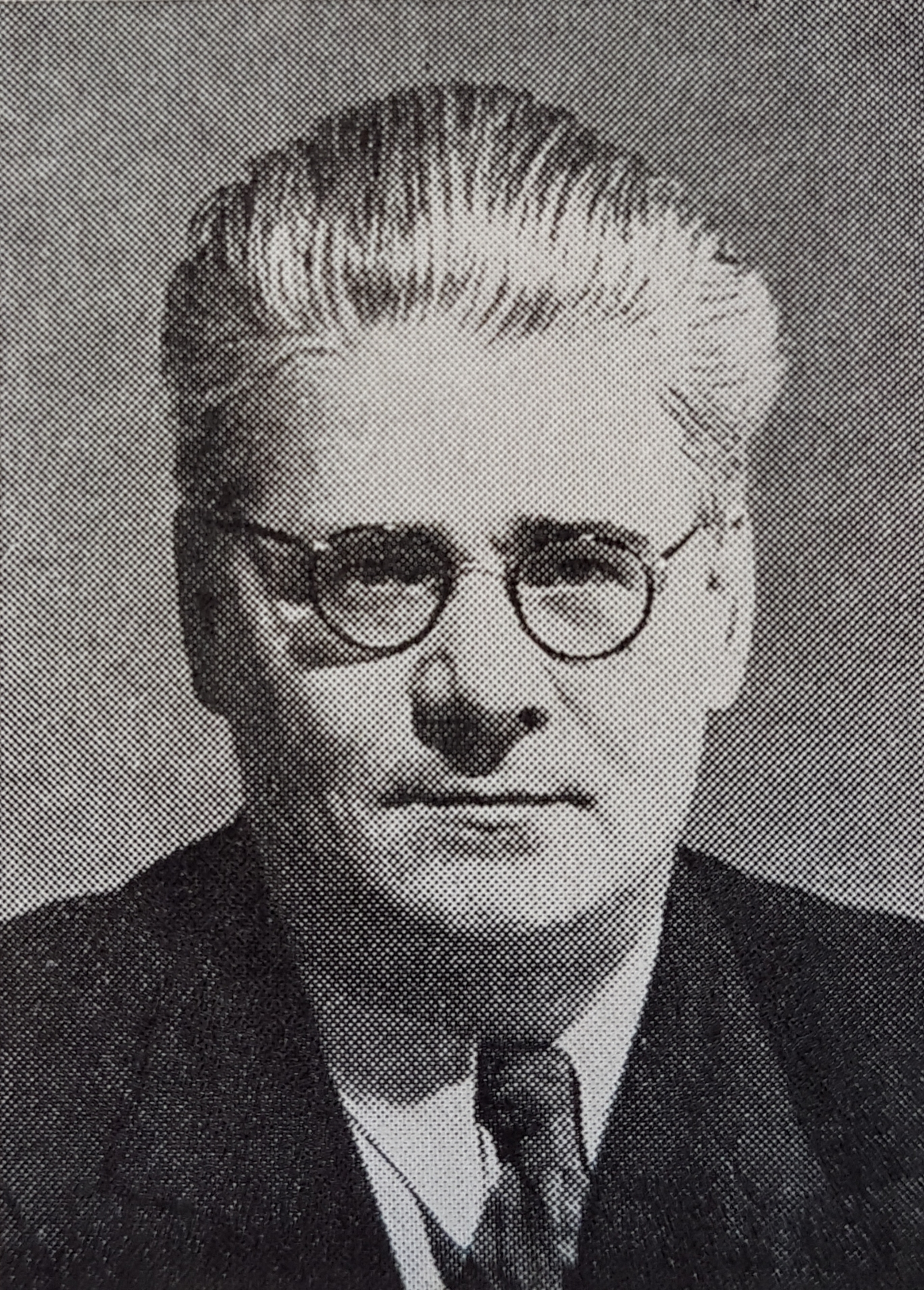
Gunnar Andersson in 1940

Gunnar Andersson (born 1890, Tjällmo, d. 1946) was a Swedish trade union organizer. He belonged to the Metalworkers' Union. In 1945, he attended the World Trade Union Conference in London alongside many renowned trade unionists. In 1946 Andersson was elected as chairman of the Swedish Trade Union Confederation but died prior to the initiation of his term in office.

Trade union offices
Preceded by Fritjof Ekman	General Secretary of the Swedish Metalworkers' Union; 1932–1937	Succeeded by Oscar Westerlund
