= Handels =

Handels can be:

- Stockholm School of Economics
- Swedish Commercial Employees' Union
