= Axel Strand =

Swedish trade unionist (1893–1983)

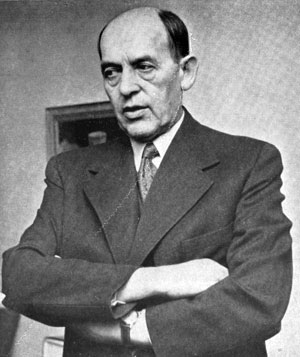
Axel Strand

Axel Strand (13 November 1893 in Burlöv – 13 September 1983 in Stockholm) was a Swedish trade union organizer. A carpenter by profession, he belonged to the Swedish Wood Industry Workers' Union. Strand was the chairman of the Swedish Trade Union Confederation 1947–1956.
