= Swedish Building Workers' Union =

Swedish trade union

Byggnads
- Swedish Building Workers' Union
- Svenska Byggnadsarbetareförbundet
- Founded: 1 January 1949
- Headquarters: Stockholm, Sweden
- Location: Sweden
- Members: 80,472 (2019)
- Key people: Lars Hildingsson, president
- Affiliations: LO, IFBWW
- Website: www.byggnads.se

The Swedish Building Workers' Union (Swedish: Svenska Byggnadsarbetareförbundet, Byggnads) is a trade union representing workers in the construction industry in Sweden.

The union was established on 1 January 1949, when the Swedish Building Wood Workers' Union merged with the labourers' section of the Swedish Factory Workers' Union, the plumbers' section of the Swedish Metalworkers' Union and the construction workers' section of the Swedish Road Workers' Union. Like all its predecessors, the union affiliated to the Swedish Trade Union Confederation.

On formation, the union had 107,373 members. In 1961, it was joined by the Swedish Bricklayers' Union, and the union's membership peaked at 156,462 in 1964. In 1970, part of the Swedish Stone Workers' Union joined, followed in 1973 by the Swedish Divers' Union, and in 2000 by the Swedish Sheet Metal Workers' Union. Despite these mergers, by 2019, the union's membership had dropped to 80,472, slightly over half its strength compared to the union's mid-1960s heyday.

== Presidents ==
1949: John Grevin
1952: Knut Johansson
1975: Börje Jönsson
1977: Bertil Whinberg
1991: Åke Wänman
1993: Ove Bengtsberg
2002: Hans Tilly
2012: Johan Lindholm
2024: Lars Hildingsson
