= Philippine Metalworkers' Alliance =

Trade union federation of metal workers in the Philippines

PMA
- Founded: 9 November 2003
- Location: Philippines
- Members: 13,000
- Key people: Reynaldo Rasing, General Secretary
- Affiliations: SENTRO, IndustriALL
- Website: pmaunions.wordpress.com

The Philippine Metalworkers' Alliance (PMA) is a trade union federation of metal workers in the Philippines. This includes workers in the automotive, electrical and electronics, iron, steel and shipbuilding sectors. PMA has 25 affiliated unions and is itself affiliated with the Sentro ng mga Nagkakaisa at Progresibong Manggagawa and IndustriALL Global Union.

== History ==
PMA was founded on November 9, 2003, and was formally registered as a national organisation on May 13, 2008.

In 2019, PMA filed a safeguard measure against the import of cars into the Philippines with the Department of Trade and Industry (DTI). The federation said that a rise in imports had led to the loss of jobs in the car-building sector. Car companies did not take part in the filing.

In January 2021, the PMA's petition resulted in the DTI imposing new temporary customs duties on imported cars until the Tariff Commission made a permanent decision. PMA welcomed the decision, but the Chamber of Automobile Manufacturers of the Philippines claimed the new rules would have a negative effect on the industry. The Manila Times also condemned the new tariff. At preliminary hearings organised by the Tariff Commission in February, car companies including Mitsubishi, Toyota and Isuzu as well as the Philippine distributors of Mazda, Fuso and Geely questioned PMA's right to speak on behalf of the Filipino car industry.
