= Swedish Bakery and Confectionery Workers' Union =

Trade union in Sweden

The Swedish Bakery and Confectionery Workers' Union (Swedish: Svenska Bageri- och Konditoriindustriarbetareförbundet, Bageri) was a trade union representing workers in the food processing industry in Sweden.

The union was founded on 25 June 1896 in Gothenburg, as the Swedish Bakery Workers' Union. It had only 430 members at the end of the year, but grew rapidly. It relocated its headquarters to Stockholm in 1898, and that year set up a separate section for women. It affiliated to the Swedish Trade Union Confederation in 1899.

The union's merger with the Swedish Sugar Bakery Workers' Union in 1904 led to a change of name in 1908. By 1921, the union had 7,200 members. The following year, it merged with the Swedish Butchers' Union to form the Swedish Food Workers' Union.
