= Swedish Cooperage Union =

Trade union in Sweden

The Swedish Cooperage Union (Swedish: Svenska tunnbinderiförbundet, Tunnbinderi) was a trade union for coopers in Sweden.

The union was founded in 1892, with only 85 members, growing to a peak of 565 members in 1897. It affiliated to the Swedish Trade Union Confederation, but by 1935 it had only 167 members remaining, and the following year, it merged into the Swedish Wood Industry Workers' Union.

The red banners of the Swedish Coopers Union frequently displayed barrels, and occasionally a tomte.
