= Swedish Bookbinders' Union =

Trade union in Sweden

The Swedish Bookbinders' Union (Swedish: Svenska Bokbindareförbundet, SBbaf) was a trade union representing bookbinders in Sweden.

The union was founded on 18 March 1893 as the Swedish Bookbinding Workers' Union, and set up headquarters in Stockholm. It was an early member of the Swedish Trade Union Confederation, joining in 1900. It grew steadily, from 356 members at the end of 1893, to 1,828 in 1908. By 1910, membership had fallen back to 496, but growth then resumed in earnest. By 1970, it had 12,192 members.

The union's journal for many years was the Bokbinderi-Arbetaren, but from 1960 it instead published Grafisk revy jointly with the Swedish Typographers' Union (Typograf). On 1 January 1973, the union merged with Typograf and the Swedish Lithographic Union, to form the Swedish Graphic Workers' Union.
