= Hans-Olof Nilsson =

Swedish former trade union leader (born 1956)

15th President of the International Union of Food, Agricultural, Hotel, Restaurant, Catering, Tobacco and Allied Workers' Associations (IUF)
- In office 2012–2017
- Preceded by: Paul Andela
- Succeeded by: Mark Lauritsen

President of the Swedish Food Workers' Union (Livs)

Personal details
- Born: 1956 (age 69–70)
- Occupation: Butcher, trade unionist

Hans-Olof Nilsson (born 22 December 1956) is a Swedish former trade union leader.

Born in Eslöv, Nilsson began working at a slaughterhouse owned by the Kooperativa Förbundet in 1972. He joined the Swedish Food Workers' Union (Livs), and in 2000 began working full-time at its head office. The following year, he was elected as the union's vice president, then in 2005 he became its president. In 2007, he was additionally elected as the president of the International Union of Food, Agricultural, Hotel, Restaurant, Catering, Tobacco and Allied Workers' Associations. In 2017, he retired from his trade union positions.

Trade union offices
| Preceded by Åke Södergren | President of the Swedish Food Workers' Union; 2005–2017 | Succeeded by Eva Guovelin |
| Preceded by Paul Andela | President of the International Union of Food, Agricultural, Hotel, Restaurant, Catering, Tobacco and Allied Workers' Associations; 2007–2017 | Succeeded by Mark Lauritsen |
