= Swedish Tele Union =

Trade union in Sweden

The Swedish Tele Union (Swedish: Svenska Teleförbundet, SvT) was a trade union representing workers in the telecommunications industry in Sweden.

The union was founded on 24 June 1901, at a conference in Norrköping, as the Swedish National Telephone and Telegraph Workers' Union. It initially had 200 members. The Association of Telegraph Offices' Assistants split away in 1905, but it merged into the Traffic Employees' Union of Telegraph Administration in 1918, and rejoined the SvT in 1939. The Association of Telegraph Offices' Assistants joined in 1916, while the Association of Radio Operators of Telecommunications Administration joined in 1918, but left again in 1920. In 1919, the Union of Telegraph Administration Employees split away from the SvT, but it rejoined in 1939.

By 1930, the union had 2,708 members. It then affiliated to the Swedish Trade Union Confederation and grew rapidly. By 1969, it had 24,946 members. The following year, it merged with seven others, to form the Swedish National Union of State Employees.
