= Swedish Sailors' Union =

Trade union in Sweden

The Swedish Sailors' Union (Swedish: Svenska Sjöfolksförbundet, SSF) was a trade union representing sailors from Sweden.

The union was established on 24 October 1932, with the merger of five unions:

- Swedish American Line Supply Service Employees' Union
- Swedish Association of Seafaring Women
- Swedish Association of Stewards
- Swedish Firemen's Union
- Swedish Seamen's Union

The union immediately affiliated to the Swedish Trade Union Confederation. On founding, the union had 14,501 members, but the Swedish Association of Stewards left before the end of the year, and membership dropped to a low of 6,635 in 1944. It rapidly rebounded after World War II, and the Stewards finally rejoined in 1970. By 1995, it had 10,311 members. The following year, it merged into the Swedish Union for Service and Communications Employees.
