= Swedish Union for Service and Communications Employees =

Trade union in Sweden

SEKO
- Swedish Union for Service and Communications Employees
- Facket för Service och Kommunikation
- Founded: 14 May 1970
- Headquarters: Stockholm
- Location: Sweden
- Members: 72,156 (2018)
- Key people: Gabriella Lavecchia, president
- Affiliations: LO, PSI, UNI
- Website: www.seko.se

The Swedish Union for Service and Communications Employees (Swedish: Service- och Kommunikationsfacket, SEKO) is a trade union in Sweden.

== History ==
The union was founded on 14 May 1970, as the Swedish National Union of State Employees (SF). It resulted from the merger of eight unions:

- Employees' Union of State Power Stations
- Swedish Civil Administration's Employees' Union
- Swedish Defence Forces Civilian Employees' Union
- Swedish Post Union
- Swedish Prison Employees' Union
- Swedish Railway Employees' Union
- Swedish Road Workers' Union
- Swedish Tele Union

Like all its predecessors, the union affiliated to the Swedish Trade Union Confederation. On formation, it had 145,350 members, and the number grew to 161,794 in 1986. The National Association of Civil Servants in Prisons split away in 1973.

In 1995, the union became SEKO. The following year, the Swedish Sailors' Union merged in, then in 1997 the Swedish Association of Engine Drivers split away. By 2019, it had a membership of 70,818.

The union is divided into nine branches:

- Rail transportation
- Public administration
- Postal
- Roads & Railways
- Telecom
- Correctional treatment
- Energy
- Defence
- Maritime

== Presidents ==
1970: Gustaf Kolare
1973: Lars-Erik Nicklasson
1984: Curt Persson
1995: Gunnar Erlandsson
1998: Sven-Olof Arbestål
2002: Janne Rudén
2017: Valle Karlsson
2021: Gabriella Lavecchia
