= Swedish Stone Workers' Union =

Swedish trade union

The Swedish Stone Workers' Union (Swedish: Svenska Stenindustriarbetareförbundet, Sten) was a trade union representing stonemasons and related workers in Sweden.

The union was founded in 1897, as the Swedish branch of the Scandinavian Stonemasons' Union. In 1898, it became independent, and established its headquarters in Lysekil. It affiliated to the Swedish Trade Union Confederation and grew rapidly, having 5,870 members by 1908. It reached a peak membership of 11,516 in 1930, and the number then steadily declined. By 1969, it had only 2,939 members. The following year, it was dissolved, with the majority of its members transferring to the Swedish Factory Workers' Union, while a minority who worked in the construction industry instead joining the Swedish Building Workers' Union.
