= Swedish Brewery Industry Workers' Union =

Trade union in Sweden

The Swedish Brewery Industry Workers' Union (Swedish: Svenska Bryggeriindustriarbetareförbundet, SBiaf) was a trade union representing workers in breweries in Sweden.

The union was founded in Stockholm on 22 January 1899, with 1,121 members. In 1905, it affiliated to the Swedish Trade Union Confederation. In 1909, the Swedish Cork Workers' Union merged into SBiaf, and membership peaked in 1940 at 7,539. It then declined, falling to 5,533 by 1964. The following year, it merged into the Swedish Food Workers' Union.
