= Swedish Textile, Garment and Leather Workers' Union =

Trade union in Sweden

The Swedish Textile, Garment and Leather Workers' Union (Swedish: Beklädnadsarbetarnas förbund. Textil Konfektion Läder, Beklädnads) was a trade union representing workers in several related industries in Sweden.

The union was founded on 1 January 1972, when the Swedish Clothing Workers' Union merged with the Swedish Shoe and Leather Workers' Union and the Swedish Textile Workers' Union. Like all its predecessors, it affiliated to the Swedish Trade Union Confederation. It initially had 54,437 members, but this figure fell rapidly, in line with employment in the industry. By 1992, it had only 19,215 members, and the following year, it merged with the Swedish Factory Workers' Union, to form the Swedish Industrial Union.

== Presidents ==
1972: Ivan Lind
1974: Karl-Erik Persson
