= Building Maintenance Workers' Union (Sweden) =

Swedish trade union

Fastighets
- Building Maintenance Workers' Union
- Fastighetsanställdas Förbund
- Founded: 26 April 1936; 90 years ago
- Headquarters: Stockholm
- Location: Sweden
- Members: 26,324(2018)
- Key people: Magnus Pettersson, president
- Affiliations: LO, UNI
- Website: www.fastighets.se

The Building Maintenance Workers' Union (Swedish: Fastighetsanställdas Förbund, Faf) is a trade union in Sweden.

The union was founded on 26 April 1936 at a conference in Stockholm. It affiliated to the Swedish Trade Union Confederation in 1938. It absorbed the Stockholm Union of Cleaners in 1948, and rose to a peak membership of 44,302 in 1998. By 2019, however, its membership had fallen to 25,634.

Faf represents building maintenance workers employed by private cleaners in cleaning companies, window cleaners and employees of Folkets Hus (Labour Movement Community Centres).
