= Johan Lindholm =

Swedish trade union leader

President of the Swedish Trade Union Confederation
- Incumbent
- Assumed office 18 May 2024
- Deputy: Louise Olsson
- Preceded by: Susanna Gideonsson

President of the Swedish Building Workers' Union
- In office 12 June 2012 – 18 May 2024
- Deputy: Lars Hildingsson
- Preceded by: Hans Tilly
- Succeeded by: Lars Hildingsson

Personal details
- Born: 1 May 1964 (age 61) Mjölby, Östergötland County, Sweden
- Party: Social Democratic Party
- Occupation: Trade union leader, carpenter

Lennart Johan Jörgen Lindholm (born 1 May 1964) is a Swedish trade union leader and carpenter who has served as the president of the Swedish Trade Union Confederation since May 2024. He previously served as President of the Swedish Building Workers' Union from 2012 to 2024.

== Biography ==
Born in Mjölby in Östergötland County, Lindhom grew up in Södertälje in Stockholm County. He worked as a carpenter before getting involved in the trade union division "Byggettan" in Södertälje.

Lindholm became known to the wider public in connection with the Laval un Partneri Ltd v Svenska Byggnadsarbetareförbundet conflict, when, in his capacity as chairman of "Byggettan", he fought for Swedish collective bargaining agreement to be applied within the Swedish labor market.

Trade union offices
Preceded by Hans Tilly	President of the Swedish Building Workers' Union; 2012–2024	Succeeded by Lars Hildingsson
Preceded by Susanna Gideonsson	President of the Swedish Trade Union Confederation; 2024–	Succeeded by Incumbent
