= Swedish Sawmill Industry Workers' Union =

Trade union in Sweden

The Swedish Saw Mill Industry Workers Union (Swedish: Svenska sågverksindustriarbetarförbundet, abbreviated SSIAF) was a trade union of saw mill workers in Sweden. The union was founded in 1891, it was initially known as Svenska sågverks- och brädgårdsarbetareförbundet.

The union died out after a few years, but was refounded in 1897. The refounding followed a decision by the congress of the Social Democratic Labour Party to organize workers in Norrland. Kymmer Olof Danielsson from Gävle became the chairman of the refounded union. In 1898 it was one of three trade unions that founded the Swedish Trade Union Confederation (LO). The organization experienced a period of growth between 1905 and 1907, during which many new branches were set up.

The name SSIAF was adopted in 1908. SSIAF suffered a severe backlash after the failed 1909 general strike. The union lost around 67% of its membership during this period.

In 1925 SSIAF formed a joint cartel along with the forest and paper industry unions. In 1936 the three union launch a joint publication, Skogsindustriarbetaren ('The Forest Industry Worker'). The SSIAF member August Lindberg became the LO chairman in the same year (a position he held until 1947).

In 1920, the cellulose workers in the union left to join the new Swedish Paper Workers' Union, while in 1937, 10,497 relevant workers transferred to the Swedish Forest and Rafters' Union. SSIAF merged into the Swedish Wood Industry Workers' Union in 1948.
