= Swedish Sheet Metal Workers' Union =

Trade union in Sweden

The Swedish Sheet Metal Workers' Union (Swedish: Svenska Bleck- och Plåtslagareförbundet, SBOP) was a trade union representing sheet metal workers in Sweden.

The union was founded in 1893, as a split from the Swedish Metalworkers' Union. While it initially had only 125 members, the membership reached 1,849 by 1907. It was an early affiliate of the Swedish Trade Union Confederation, joining by 1901.

The union hit an all-time peak of 6,256 members in 1992. Towards the end of the 1990s, it steadily lost members, and by 1999 was down to 4,411 members. On 1 January 2000, it merged into the Swedish Building Workers' Union.
