= Swedish Factory Workers' Union =

Trade union in Sweden

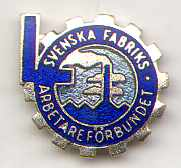
Swedish Factory Workers Union pin badge

The Swedish Factory Workers' Union (Swedish: Svenska Fabriksarbetareförbundet, Fabriks) was a trade union representing manufacturing workers in Sweden.

The union was founded on 1 November 1891 in Lund, as the Södra District Heavy Industry Union. In 1895, it began admitting workers from across the country, moving its headquarters to Stockholm, and renamed itself as the Swedish Heavy and Factory Workers' Union. In 1899, it affiliated to the Swedish Trade Union Confederation.

Numerous other unions formed as split from Fabriks: the Swedish Transport Workers' Union in 1897, the Swedish Farm Workers' Union in 1900, the Swedish Hat Workers' Union in 1903, the Swedish Municipal Workers' Union in 1910, the Swedish Road Workers' Union in 1914, the Swedish Chimney Sweeps' Union in 1918, and the Swedish Paper Workers' Union in 1920, while building labourers transferred to the new Swedish Building Workers' Union in 1949. It absorbed the Swedish Glass Workers' Union in 1907, the Swedish Tile and Slab Workers' Union in 1946, the Swedish Operating Personnel Union in 1948, and the majority of both the United Unions in 1962, and the Swedish Stone Workers' Union in 1970.

The union had only 419 members on formation, but grew rapidly, to reach 47,267 by 1907. Membership dropped to 11,521 in 1911, but then grew again, reaching an all-time peak of 107,600 members in 1947. Over the following decades, membership declined slightly, falling to 71,958 by 1992, at which time, 96% of its members worked in the chemical industry, 3% in personal services, and most of the remainder in quarrying. The following year, it merged with the Swedish Textile, Garment and Leather Workers' Union, to form the Swedish Industrial Union.

== Presidents ==
- 1891: A. Hemberg
- H. W. Lindström
- Carl F. Lindahl
- 1950: Gunnar Mohlne
- Johan Johansson
- Valdemar Lundberg
- 1975: Nils Kristoffersson
- 1988: Uno Ekberg
