= Swedish Bricklayers' Union =

Trade union in Sweden

The Swedish Bricklayers' Union (Swedish: Svenska Murareförbundet, Murare) was a trade union representing bricklayers in Sweden.

The union was founded on 14 December 1890, at a conference in Lund, and then refounded in 1892 in Malmö. It joined the Swedish Trade Union Confederation in 1899. The union initially had 629 members, but grew steadily, reaching 4,468 by 1908, and 14,140 in 1960. In 1961, it merged into the Swedish Building Workers' Union.

== Presidents ==
1894: Nils Persson
1922: Victor Björkman
1950: Gösta Bengtsson
