= Swedish Lithographic Union =

Trade union in Sweden

The Swedish Lithographic Union (Swedish: Sveriges Litografiska Förbund, Litograf) was a trade union representing lithographic printers in Sweden.

The first Swedish Lithographic Union was established in 1895 at a conference in Norrköping. However, in 1904, the union's Malmö branch established a new International Lithographic Union of Sweden, which by the end of 1905 had replaced the original union. In 1906, it was joined by the formerly independent Lithographic Union of Stockholm, and it soon also affiliated to the Swedish Trade Union Confederation.

For the first couple of decades, the union's membership was only a few hundred, but it reached 1,000 in 1925, and then steadily grew to peak at 6,325 in 1970. In 1928, it renamed itself as the "Swedish Lithographic Union".

From 1925, the union collaborated with the Swedish Bookbinders' Union and the Swedish Typographers' Union, in the Graphic Industry Cartel. On 1 January 1973, the three unions merged, to form the Swedish Graphic Workers' Union.
