= Swedish Post Union =

Trade union

The Swedish Post Union (Swedish: Svenska Postförbundet, SPF) was a trade union representing postal workers in Sweden.

The union was founded on 8 October 1886 at a conference in Stockholm. It was initially very small, with only 75 members by the end of 1887, but it grew steadily; although the Stockholm Association of Postmen broke away in 1890, it rejoined in 1896. The Swedish Association of Sorting Clerks split away in 1912, but rejoined in 1917, by which time the SPF had 2,915 members.

In 1920, the union absorbed the Swedish Association of Rural Postmen, and in 1936, it affiliated to the Swedish Trade Union Confederation. The Swedish Association of Post Office Managers joined in 1947. By 1969, the union had a record 27,451 members. The following year, it merged with seven others, to form the Swedish National Union of State Employees.
