= Swedish Social Insurance Employees' and Insurance Agents' Union =

Trade union in Sweden

The Swedish Social Insurance Employees' and Insurance Agents' Union (Swedish: Försäkringsanställdas Förbund, FF) was a trade union representing workers in the insurance industry in Sweden.

The union was founded on 11 May 1918, when the Association of Ombudsmen in the Folket Insurance Company merged with the Central Organisation of Agents and Collectors of the Trygg Insurance Company. The Association of De Förenades' Insurance Agents participated in the founding conference, but withdrew when the new union decided to affiliate to the Swedish Trade Union Confederation (LO).

The union initially had only 224 members, but was joined in 1920 by the Association of Office Employees in the Folket Insurance Company, in 1938 by the Swedish Health Insurance Offices' Employees' Union, and in 1955 by the Association of Insurance General and Chief Agents. Membership peaked at 23,867 in 1981, then steadily fell. By 2000, it had only 13,020 members, and in 2001 it disaffiliated from LO. The following year, it transferred to the Swedish Confederation of Professional Employees and merged into the Swedish Union of Civil Servants.
