= Swedish Road Workers' Union =

Trade union in Sweden

The Swedish Road Workers' Union (Swedish: Svenska Vägarbetareförbundet, SVaf) was a trade union representing road and railway maintenance workers in Sweden.

The union was founded in 1914, as the Swedish Road Construction Workers' Union, a split from the Swedish Factory Workers' Union. It immediately affiliated to the Swedish Confederation of Trade Unions, and secured its first collective agreement in 1924. It was originally based in Krylbo in central Sweden, but moved its headquarters to Stockholm in 1939. Membership peaked that year, at 27,169, then slowly declined. In 1949, it members involved in construction were transferred to the new Swedish Building Workers' Union. By 1969, the union had 15,776 members, of whom only 11 were women. The following year, it merged into the new Swedish National Union of State Employees.
