= Swedish Food Workers' Union =

Trade union in Sweden

Livs
- Food Workers' Union
- Livsmedelsarbetareförbundet
- Founded: 1 January 1922
- Headquarters: Stockholm, Sweden
- Location: Sweden
- Members: 22,877
- Key people: Eva Gouvelin, president
- Affiliations: LO, IUF
- Website: www.livs.se

The Swedish Food Workers' Union (Swedish: Livsmedelsarbetareförbundet, Livs) is a trade union representing workers in the food and drink industries in Sweden.

The union was founded on 1 January 1922, when the Swedish Bakery and Confectionery Workers' Union merged with the Swedish Butchers' Union. Like both its predecessors, it affiliated to the Swedish Trade Union Confederation. On foundation, it had 9,372 members, which had grown 38,053 by 1959. The Swedish Tobacco Industry Workers' Union joined in 1964, followed by the Swedish Brewery Industry Workers' Union in 1965, and the dairy workers' section of the Swedish Commercial Employees' Union in 1968. Its membership peaked at 53,131 in 1985, but had dropped to 22,877 by 2019.

The Union launched a campaign called "Scandal" in December 2013 to highlight working conditions at Scan, Sweden's largest meat company. The campaign was successful and the Union signed an agreement with Scan.

== Presidents ==
1922: J. O. Ödlund
1923: John Rosenberg
1927: Hilding Molander
1948: Oscar Persson
1956: Anton Johansson
1966: Stig Ögersten
1969: Åke Berggren
1979: Lage Andréasson
1991: Kjell Varenblad
1996: Åke Södergren
2005: Hans-Olof Nilsson
2017: Eva Guovelin
