= Swedish Saddlemakers' and Upholsterers' Union =

Trade union in Sweden

The Swedish Saddlemakers' and Upholsterers' Union (Swedish: Svenska Sadelmakare- och tapetserareförbundet, SSoT) was a trade union representing workers in leather goods in Sweden.

== Background ==
The union was founded on 2 September 1894 in Malmö as the Scandinavian Saddlemakers' and Upholsterers' Union. It established its headquarters in Copenhagen, Denmark, and was an early affiliate of the Swedish Trade Union Confederation. It grew from an initial 70 members to 1,980 in 1930. That year, it relocated its headquarters to Sweden, and from 1939 it restricted membership to Sweden, adopting its final name. Membership increased to a peak of 5,721 in 1950, then fell slightly to 4,974 in 1961. The following year, it dissolved, with about 4,000 members, working in upholstery, transferring to the Swedish Wood Industry Workers' Union, while the remainder working in saddlery transferred to the Swedish Shoe and Leather Workers' Union.
