= Swedish Graphic Workers' Union =

Trade union in Sweden

- Grafiska Fackförbundet - Mediafacket
- Merged into: GS
- Founded: 1 January 1973
- Dissolved: 1 June 2009
- Headquarters: Stockholm, Sweden
- Location: Sweden
- Members: 23,000
- Key people: Tommy Andersson, president
- Publication: Dagens Arbete
- Affiliations: LO
- Website: www.gf.se

The Swedish Graphic Workers' Union (Swedish: Grafiska Fackförbundet, Grafiska or GF) was a trade union representing printing industry workers in Sweden.

The union was founded when the Swedish Bookbinders' Union merged with the Swedish Lithographic Union and the Swedish Typographers' Union. The merger was agreed at a congress held in Stockholm on 17 August 1972, and the new union was formed on 1 January 1973. Like all its predecessors, GF affiliated to the Swedish Trade Union Confederation.

Upon its foundation, the union had 33,162 members, and the number grew to a peak of 40,491 in 1989. Membership then declined, in line with employment in the industry, and by 2008 it was down to only 17,251. In 2009, it merged with the Swedish Forest and Wood Workers' Union, to form GS.

== Presidents ==
1987: Valter Carlsson
1995: Malte Eriksson
2003: Jan Österlind
2007: Tommy Andersson
