= Swedish Typographers' Union =

Trade union in Sweden

The Swedish Typographers' Union (Swedish: Svenska Typografförbundet, Typograf) was a trade union representing book printers in Sweden.

The union was founded on 7 July 1886 at a conference in Stockholm, and it began operations in June 1887. Founded with 355 members, it grew rapidly, and by 1909 it had 5,973 members. It affiliated to the Swedish Trade Union Confederation in 1920.

The union's journal for many years was the Svenska typograftidningen, but from 1960 it instead published Grafisk revy jointly with the Swedish Bookbinders' Union (SBbaf). By 1970, the union had 15,344 members. On 1 January 1973, the union merged with the SBbaf and the Swedish Lithographic Union, to form the Swedish Graphic Workers' Union.
