= Swedish Prison Employees' Union =

Trade union in Sweden

Karl Gutke, first chairman of Sveriges fångvårdsmannaförbund (Trade union of prison guards)

The Swedish Prison Employees' Union (Swedish: Svenska Vårdpersonalförbundet was a trade union representing prison staff in Sweden.

The union was founded on 7 June 1906 in Gothenburg, as the Swedish Prison Guards' Union. It grew slowly, with 496 members in 1910, and 1,557 by 1954. It affiliated to the Swedish Trade Union Confederation in 1939, and in 1948, it moved its headquarters to Stockholm. By 1969, it had 3,829 members. The following year, it merged into the new Swedish National Union of State Employees.
