= August Lindberg =

Swedish trade unionist

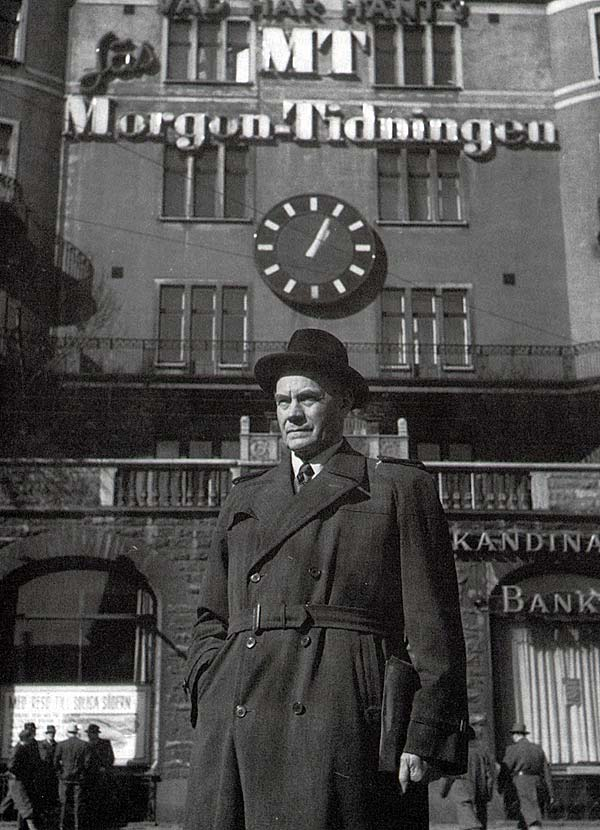
Lindberg in front of the LO headquarters in Stockholm, 1949.

August Lindberg (6 September 1885, Älvkarleby, Uppsala County – 15 July 1966, Stockholm) was a Swedish trade union organizer. He was a sawmill worker by profession, and belonged to the Swedish Saw Mill Industry Workers Union (Swedish: Svenska sågverksindustriarbetarförbundet, SSIAF). Lindberg was chairman of the Swedish Trade Union Confederation (Swedish: Landsorganisationen i Sverige, LO) from 1936 to 1947. He was also a member of the Swedish Social Democratic Party (Swedish: Sveriges socialdemokratiska arbetarparti, SAP).

Lindberg was a proponent of cooperation between the LO and the Swedish Employers Association (Swedish: Svenska arbetsgivareföreningen, SAF), which resulted in the signing of the Saltsjöbaden Agreement in 1938.
