= Swedish Clothing Workers' Union =

Trade union in Sweden

The Swedish Clothing Workers' Union (Swedish: Svenska Beklädnadsarbetareförbundet, SBaf or Beklädnads) was a trade union representing workers in the garment industry in Sweden.

The union was founded on 18 August 1889 in Stockholm, as the Swedish Tailors' Union, initially only admitting men. In 1899, it affiliated to the Swedish Trade Union Confederation and also began admitting women. The Stockholm Women Tailors' Association joined in 1900, followed in 1909 by the Women's Trade Union. From 405 founding members, it grew to 3,968 members in 1907.

The Swedish Hat and Fur Workers' Union joined in 1933, and the union's membership reached a peak of 37,612 in 1956. It then began falling, dropping to 25,475 members in 1972, of whom 83% were women. The following year, it merged with the Swedish Shoe and Leather Workers' Union and the Swedish Textile Workers' Union, to form the Swedish Textile, Garment and Leather Workers' Union.
