= Susanna Gideonsson =

Swedish trade unionist

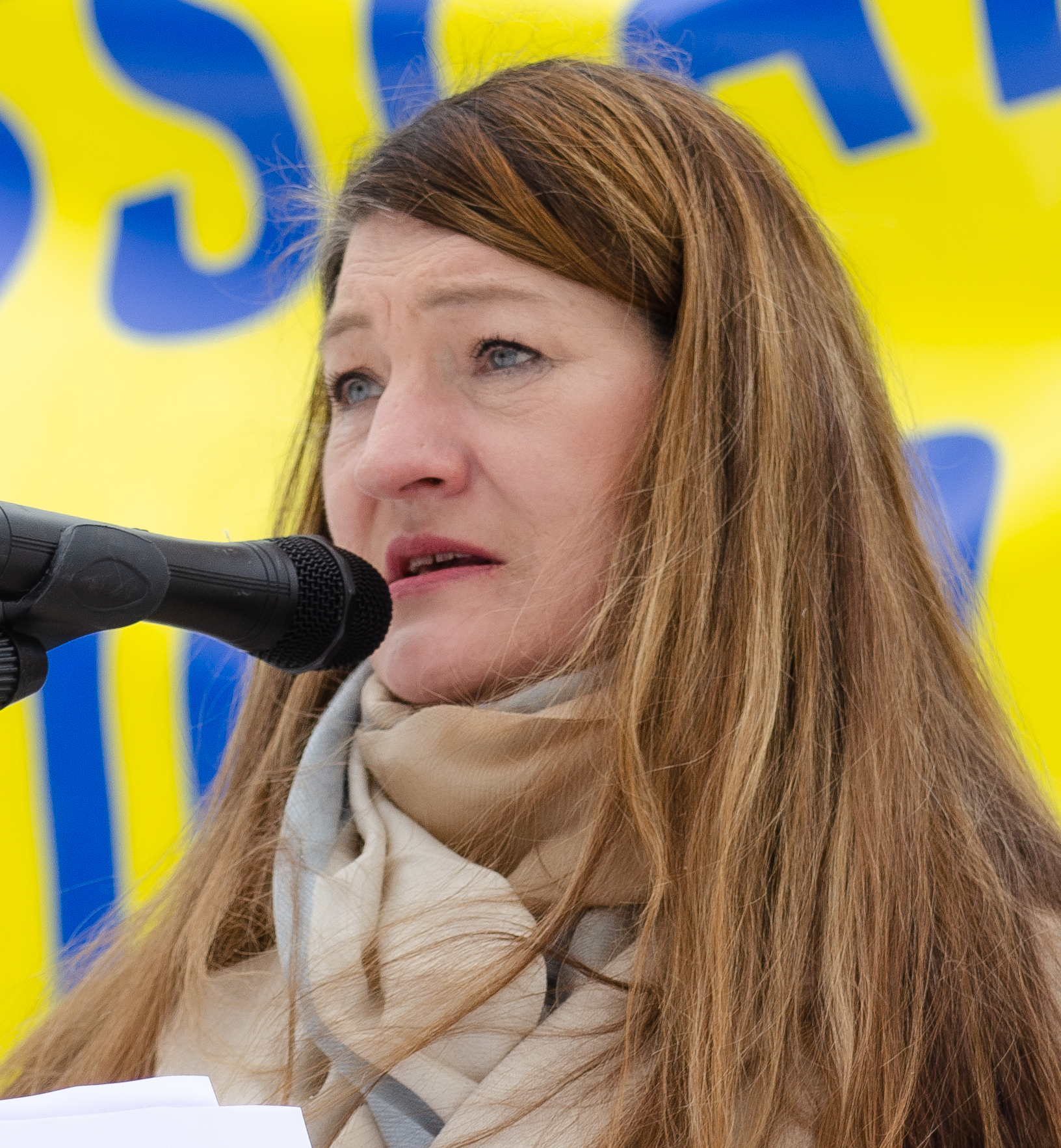
Susanna Gideonsson (LO) during a demonstration on March 29, 2023 at Fria Ukrainas Plats outside the Russian Embassy in Stockholm.

Susanna Gideonsson (born 19 May 1963) is a Swedish trade union leader.

Born in Umnäs, Gideonsson moved around Sweden with her family until they settled in Lycksele in the northern part of the country. She worked part-time delivering newspapers from the age of 14, when she joined the Swedish Transport Workers' Union. At the age of sixteen, she began working in the local woodworking factory, and in 1983, she was elected as leader of the joint committee of Swedish Trade Union Confederation (LO) affiliated unions in the town. After the factory was sold, she was unemployed for a period before finding work with the forestry service.

In 1989, Gideonsson became the regional leader of the Swedish Social Democratic Youth League in Västerbotten, and through this joined the Swedish Commercial Employees' Union. She worked full-time for the union from 1996, in Söderhamn and then in Luleå, and from 2005 in its national office. In 2006, she was elected as the union's vice president, and in 2014 she became its president.

In 2020, Gideonsson was elected as the president of LO. As leader, she proposed to focus on strengthening the trade union movement, reduce exploitation at work, promote equality and campaign for strong social welfare.

Trade union offices
Preceded by Lars Anders Häggström	President of the Swedish Commercial Employees' Union; 2014–2020	Succeeded by Linda Palmetzhofer
Preceded by Karl-Petter Thorwaldsson	President of the Swedish Trade Union Confederation; 2020–2024	Succeeded by Johan Lindholm
