= Swedish Foundry Workers' Union =

Trade union in Sweden

The Swedish Foundry Workers' Union (Swedish: Svenska Gjutareförbundet, Gjutare) was a trade union representing workers in foundries in Sweden.

The union was established in 1893, following a split from the Swedish Metalworkers' Union, with 389 members. In 1899, it affiliated to the Swedish Trade Union Confederation. Its membership peaked at 12,294 in 1950, and was then fairly stable until collapsing in 1963, to only 4,907. The following year, it rejoined the Swedish Metalworkers' Union.
