= Employees' Union of State Power Stations =

Trade union in Sweden

The Employees' Union of State Power Stations (Swedish: Kraftverkens Personalförbund, Kpf) was a trade union representing power station workers in Sweden.

The union was founded in 1921 in Trollhättan. It initially had only 200 members, and grew very slowly. In 1940, it affiliated to the Swedish Trade Union Confederation, and in 1948 it renamed itself as the Waterfall Authority Employees' Union. By 1954, it had 1,173 members.

The union adopted its final name in 1961, and its membership reached a peak of 1,789 in 1962. In 1970, it merged into the new Swedish National Union of State Employees.
