= Swedish Textile Workers' Union =

Trade union in Sweden

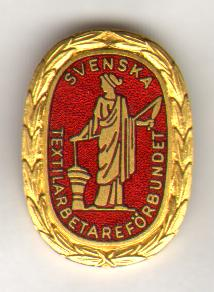
Swedish Textile Workers Union Pin

The Swedish Textile Workers' Union (Swedish: Svenska Textilarbetareförbundet, Textil) was a trade union representing workers in the textile industry in Sweden.

The union was founded in Norrköping in 1898, soon moving its headquarters to Gothenburg and then to Stockholm, but returned to Norrköping in 1912. In 1914, it negotiated its first national agreement on pay and working conditions, while in 1931 it set up an unemployment fund. In 1932, it affiliated to the Swedish Trade Union Confederation.

On formation, the union had 500 members, but it grew rapidly. The Rope Makers' Union joined in 1906, and by 1907, it had 8,978 members, the majority of whom were women. Membership boomed after World War I, and reached an all-time peak of 47,612 in 1951. It then declined, in line with employment in the industry. The Swedish Weaving Union joined in 1970, but by 1972, membership was down to 21,215. The following year, it merged with the Swedish Shoe and Leather Workers' Union and the Swedish Clothing Workers' Union, to form the Swedish Textile, Garment and Leather Workers' Union.
