= Swedish Railway Employees' Union =

Trade union in Sweden

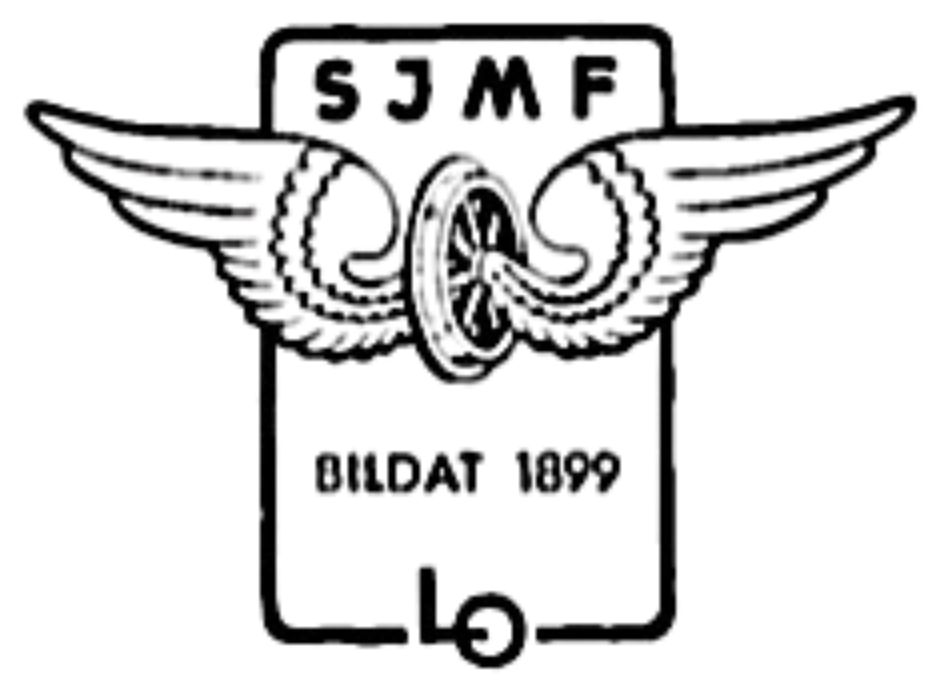
SJMF logo

The Swedish Railway Employees' Union (Swedish: Svenska Järnvägsmannaförbundet, SJMF) was a trade union representing workers in the railway industry in Sweden.

The union was founded on 12 May 1899 by 400 workers on private railways. It was joined by the Swedish Association of Railway Workers in 1903, the Association of State Railways' Car and Engine Shed Employees, and the Swedish Association of State Linemen in 1904. In 1906, both the Swedish State Railways Association of Foremen, Labourers and Office Workers and the Association of State Railways Engine Workers joined. By 1907, it had 27,694 members, of which the majority worked for the state railways.

In 1920, the Swedish State Railways' Guard Union joined, and in 1922, the SJMF affiliated to the Swedish Trade Union Confederation. In 1925, the Swedish Guard Employees' Union split away, but it rejoined in 1940. The Swedish Engine Employees' Union joined in 1941, and although the Swedish Engine Drivers' Union left in 1950, the Association of Swedish State Railways' Line Foremen joined in 1951.

Membership peaked at 69,090 in 1952, and by 1969 was down to 43,981. The following year, it merged with seven other unions, to form the Swedish National Union of State Employees.
