= Swedish Hat and Fur Workers' Union =

Trade union in Sweden

The Swedish Hat and Fur Workers' Union (Swedish: Svenska Hatt- och Pälsindustriarbetareförbundet, Hatt o Päls) was a trade union representing hat makers and furriers in Sweden.

The union was established in 1922, when the Swedish Fur Workers' Union merged with the Swedish Hat Workers' Union. Like both its predecessors, it affiliated to the Swedish Trade Union Confederation. On formation, it had 1,100 members, of whom the majority were women, and membership rose to a peak of 2,009 in 1931. In 1933, it merged into the Swedish Garment Workers' Union.
