= Swedish Defence Forces Civilian Employees' Union =

Trade union in Sweden

The Swedish Defence Forces Civilian Employees' Union (Swedish: Försvarsverkens Civila Personals Förbund, FCPF) was a trade union representing civilian staff in the Swedish Armed Forces.

The union was established on 29 December 1917 as the Army Civilian Employees' Union, and appointed its first full-time leader in 1919. In 1920, it became the FCPF, and in 1921 the Naval Shipyard Workers' Union merged in. The union affiliated to the Swedish Trade Union Confederation in 1935, and grew rapidly during World War II, membership peaking at 22,271 in 1944. It remained fairly stable over the next few decades, and stood at 18,377 in 1969. The following year, it merged into the new Swedish National Union of State Employees.
