= Swedish Tobacco Industry Workers' Union =

Trade union

The Swedish Tobacco Industry Workers' Union (Swedish: Svenska Tobaksindustriarbetareförbundet, Tobaks) was a trade union representing workers involved in processing and selling tobacco in Sweden.

The union was founded in Stockholm on 1 December 1889, as the Scandinavian Tobacco Workers' Union of Sweden with about 1,000 members. It became the International Tobacco Workers' Union of Sweden in 1899, around the time that it affiliated to the Swedish Trade Union Confederation. By 1907, it had 2,921 members, with 72% being women.

At the end of World War I, the union adopted its final name, and it then grew rapidly, reaching a peak membership of 4,616 in 1920. Membership then fell steadily, dropping to 1,421 in 1963. The following year, it merged into the Swedish Food Workers' Union.
