= Swedish Civil Administration's Employees' Union =

Trade union in Sweden

The Swedish Civil Administration's Employees' Union (Swedish: Civilförvaltningens Personalförbund, CPF) was a trade union representing lower-ranking civil servants in Sweden.

The union was founded on 9 April 1905, as the State Caretakers' Association, with just 242 members. It renamed itself as the Central Administration Employees' Union in 1924, and as the CPF in 1933. In 1939, it affiliated to the Swedish Confederation of Trade Unions, and began growing much more rapidly. It had 6,674 members by 1954, and 9,003 members in 1969. The following year, it merged into the new Swedish National Union of State Employees.
