= State Hospital Personnel Union =

Trade union in Sweden

The State Hospital Personnel Union (Swedish: Statens Sjukhuspersonals Förbund, SSF) was a trade union representing staff in psychiatric hospitals in Sweden.

The union was founded on 4 July 1908, at a conference in Lund, as the Swedish Hospital Personnel Union. It initially had only 313 members and was based in Uppsala. In 1916, the State Mental Hospital Finance Personnel Confederation split away, but the SSF continued to grow. In 1923, it moved its headquarters to Lund, by which time it had grown to 1,761 members.

In 1933, the union affiliated to the Swedish Trade Union Confederation. The State Mental Hospital Finance Personnel Confederation rejoined in 1941, followed in 1948 by the Swedish Mental Hospital Foremen's Union. By 1966, the SSF had 11,961 members, of whom a majority were women. The following year, it merged into the Swedish Municipal Workers' Union.
