= Swedish Forest Workers' Union =

Trade union in Sweden

The Swedish Forest Workers' Union (Swedish: Svenska Skogsarbetareförbundet, SSAF) was a trade union representing timber and forestry workers in Sweden.

The union was founded in 1918, as the Swedish Union of Forest Workers and Log Drivers (Swedish: Svenska skogs- och flottningsarbetareförbundet), on the initiative of the Ångermanland district of the Swedish Social Democratic Left Party. Originally based in Sollefteå, it moved its headquarters to Gävle in 1920. The following year, it affiliated to the Swedish Trade Union Confederation.

While the union only had 378 members at the end of 1918, the membership had reached 19,254 by 1924. The early 1930s proved a particularly successful period, with the majority of members gaining coverage by collective agreements. In 1934, 10,497 relevant workers transferred from the Swedish Sawmill Industry Workers' Union, and in 1938, membership reached an all-time high of 43,059.

In 1957, the union absorbed the small Swedish Timber Surveyors' Association, and in 1962 it adopted its final name, but membership was in long-term decline and by 1997 was down to only 12,160. In 1998, it merged with the Swedish Wood Industry Workers' Union, to form the Swedish Forest and Wood Workers' Union.
