= Swedish Painters' Union =

Trade union in Sweden representing painters and decorators

Målareförbundet
- Swedish Painters' Union
- Svenska Målareförbundet
- Founded: 2 October 1887
- Headquarters: Stockholm, Sweden
- Location: Sweden
- Members: 10,918
- Key people: Lars-Åke Lundin, president
- Affiliations: LO
- Website: www.malareforbundet.a.se

The Swedish Painters' Union (Swedish: Svenska Målareförbundet, SMF or Målarna) is a trade union representing painters and decorators in Sweden.

The union was founded on 2 October 1887 at a meeting in Stockholm, and originally had 800 members. It affiliated to the Swedish Trade Union Confederation in 1899, and by 1907 had grown to 4,298 members. After a decade with fluctuating membership, it began growing again, reaching a maximum membership of 22,582 in 1966. Since then, membership has steadily fallen, and in 2019 stood at 10,918.
