= Swedish Shoe and Leather Workers' Union =

Trade union in Sweden

The Swedish Shoe and Leather Workers' Union (Swedish: Svenska Sko- och läderarbetareförbundet, SSoL) was a trade union representing workers in the leather industry in Sweden.

The union was founded on 13 August 1888 in Stockholm, as the Swedish Shoemakers' Union, with 366 members. It affiliated to the Swedish Trade Union Confederation in 1899, and the membership reached 5,102 by 1907.

In 1962, the union gained about 1,100 members from the dissolved Swedish Saddlemakers' and Upholsterers' Union, and the leather workers from the dissolved United Unions, taking its membership to a peak of 15,450. However, membership then declined, in line with employment in the industry, and by 1972 membership was down to 8,083. The following year, it merged with the Swedish Clothing Workers' Union and the Swedish Textile Workers' Union, to form the Swedish Textile, Garment and Leather Workers' Union.
