= Swedish Electricians' Union =

Trade union in Sweden

SEF
- Swedish Electricians' Union
- Svenska Elektrikerförbundet
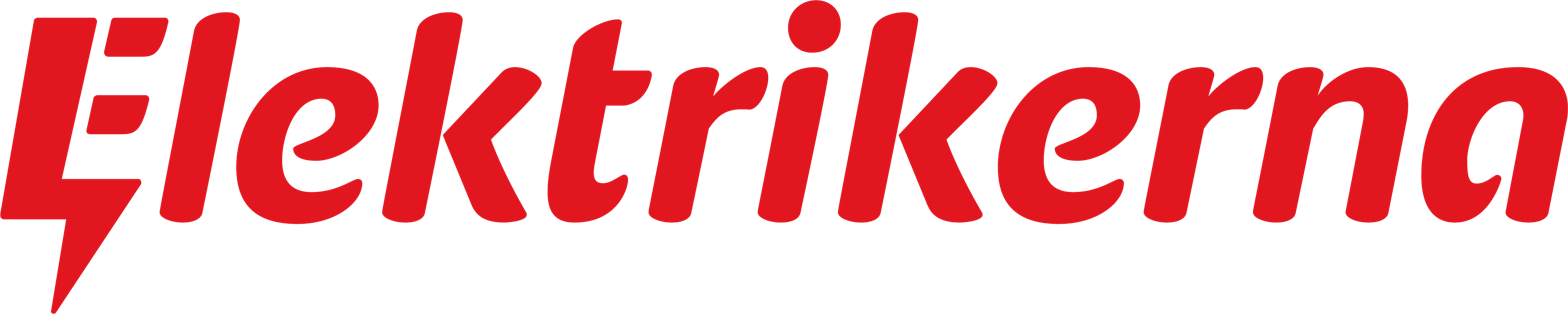
- Founded: 1906
- Headquarters: Stockholm, Sweden
- Location: Sweden
- Members: 24,775 (2011)
- Key people: Jonas Wallin, president
- Affiliations: LO
- Website: www.sef.se

Former logo

The Swedish Electricians' Union (Swedish: Svenska Elektrikerförbundet, SEF), also called Elektrikerna, is a trade union representing electricians in Sweden.

The union was founded in Stockholm in 1906, following a split from the Swedish Metalworkers' Union. It initially had only 356 members, and this figure fluctuated until 1927, when it affiliated to the Swedish Trade Union Confederation. Membership then grew to a peak of 29,170 in 1991, but has since been on a downward trajectory. The members numbered 24,775 in 2011 and 18,770 in 2019.

The union represents electricians in light and heavy instillations, as well as radio, TV and electronics technicians and power station staff.
