= Swedish Paper Workers' Union =

Trade union in Sweden

Pappers
- Swedish Paper Workers' Union
- Svenska Pappersindustriarbetareförbundet
- Founded: June 21, 1920; 106 years ago
- Headquarters: Stockholm, Sweden
- Location: Sweden
- Members: 13,494 (2019)
- Key people: Pontus Georgsson, chairman
- Affiliations: LO, IdM
- Website: www.pappers.se

The Swedish Paper Workers' Union (Swedish: Svenska Pappersindustriarbetareförbundet, Pappers) is a trade union representing workers in the pulp and paper industry in Sweden.

The union was established on 21 June 1920, at a conference in Gävle. It brought together 6,251 workers, most from the Swedish Factory Workers' Union, but a minority from the Swedish Sawmill Industry Workers' Union. It affiliated to the Swedish Trade Union Confederation in 1922, and relocated its headquarters to Stockholm in 1928. In 1946, the Swedish Pulp Operators' Union merged in, and it reached a peak membership of 47,228 in 1961.

The union's membership steadily dropped from the mid-1970s, along with employment in the industry. As of 2019, it had 13,494 members. Pontus Georgsson was the union's chairman at the . As of 2005, the union had 70 local affiliates, one at each mill.
