= Swedish Industrial Union =

Trade union in Sweden

Industrifacket
- Swedish Industrial Union
- Industrifacket
- Merged into: IF Metall
- Founded: 23 April 1993
- Dissolved: January 2006
- Headquarters: Stockholm, Sweden
- Location: Sweden
- Members: 90,000
- Key people: Leif Ohlsson, president
- Affiliations: LO
- Website: www.industrifacket.se

The Swedish Industrial Union (Swedish: Industrifacket) was a trade union representing manufacturing workers in Sweden.

It was formed on 23 April 1993, with the merger of the Swedish Factory Workers' Union and the Swedish Textile, Garment and Leather Workers' Union. Like both its predecessors, it affiliated to the Swedish Trade Union Confederation.

On formation, the union had 88,965 members, but this fell in line with employment in the industries it covered, and by 2005, it had only 65,956 members. In January 2006, it merged with the Swedish Metalworkers' Union, to form IF Metall.

== Presidents ==
1993: Uno Ekberg
1994: Arne Lökken
1999: Leif Ohlsson
