= Swedish Commercial Employees' Union =

Trade union in Sweden

Handels
- Swedish Commercial Employees' Union
- Handelsanställdas Förbund
- Founded: 15 April 1906; 120 years ago
- Headquarters: Stockholm, Sweden
- Location: Sweden
- Members: 145,000
- Key people: Susanna Gideonsson, president
- Affiliations: LO
- Website: handels.se

The Swedish Commercial Employees' Union (Swedish: Handelsanställdas Förbund, Handels) is Sweden's third-largest blue-collar union, with some 145,000 members, of whom around 25,000 are retired. Women make up over 70 percent of its membership.

The union was established on 15 April 1906, with the merger of the Malmö Goods Exporters' Union, the Lunds Goods Carriers' Union, the Stockholm Dairy Farmers' Union, the Stockholm Bread Carriers' Union, and the Stockholm Beer Drivers' Union. Although it had only 682 members, it was able to employ a full-time president. In 1910, it joined the Swedish Trade Union Confederation.

In 1922, the Swedish Dairy Farmers' Union joined Handels, followed in 1928 by the Press Agency Staff Union, and the Swedish Cinema Staff Union in 1936, although the cinema workers transferred to the Swedish Musicians' Union in 1952, and the dairy workers transferred to the Swedish Food Workers' Union in 1968. The Swedish Watchmakers' Union joined in 1970, and the Swedish Hairdressers' Union in 1989. Membership peaked at 164,591 in 1993 and has since dropped slightly, standing at 122,274 in 2019.

Although the union was founded in 1906, it is in many ways a young organization. A third of its members are under the age of 30; almost half are under the age of 35. The union is active in more than 25,000 different workplaces and represents a wide range of groups and industries. The majority of its members are in the retail sector, but it also organizes groups such as florists, hairdressers, storage and warehouse personnel, opticians, watchmakers, office staff and students in vocational training.

Handels negotiates agreements for fair pay and better working conditions. Pay is a major trade union issue, and Handels' ambition is to ensure the introduction of salary structures that are clearly linked to the conditions and work at each workplace. The union's aim is fair pay, and a key objective is the eradication of differences between men's and women's salaries.

== Presidents ==
1937: Einar Carlbring
1942:
S. A. Johansson
1950s: Algot Jönsson
1962: Erik Magnusson
1960s: Karl-Åke Granlund
1975: Börje Heggestad
1982: Bengt Lloyd
1991: Kenth Pettersson
1999: Ninel Jansson
2005: Lars Anders Häggström
2014: Susanna Gideonsson
2020: Linda Palmetzhofer
