= Swedish Metalworkers' Union =

Trade union in Sweden

Metall
- Swedish Metalworkers' Union
- Svenska Metallindustriarbetareförbundet
- Merged into: IF Metall
- Founded: 1888
- Dissolved: January 2006
- Headquarters: Stockholm, Sweden
- Location: Sweden
- Members: 409,412 (1975)
- Key people: Göran Johnsson, president
- Affiliations: LO, IMF
- Website: www.metall.se

The Swedish Metalworkers' Union (Swedish: Svenska Metallindustriarbetareförbundet often shortened in text and speech to simply Metall) was a trade union in Sweden.

== History ==
The union was founded in Stockholm on 21 May 1888, and had 555 members by the end of the year. Although the Swedish Foundry Workers' Union and the Swedish Sheet Metal Workers' Union both split away in 1893, the union grew rapidly. From 1895, it was able to support a full-time president, while in 1897 it set up an unemployment fund.

The union affiliated to the Swedish Trade Union Confederation in 1904, and although the Swedish Electricians' Union split away in 1906, by 1908, it had 33,826 members. Membership continued to grow steadily, with the foundry workers rejoining in 1962, and in 1975 it reached an all-time peak of 409,412 members. After that, it gradually declined, despite the affiliation of the Swedish Miners' Union in 1994, and by 2005 the membership number stood at 276,068. In January 2006, it merged with the Swedish Industrial Union to form IF Metall.

== Presidents ==
1925: Fritjof Ekman
1932: Gunnar Andersson
1937: Oscar Westerlund
1948: Arne Geijer
1956: Åke Nilsson
1971: Bert Lundin
1982: Leif Blomberg
1993: Göran Johnsson
