= Zenroren National Union of General Workers =

Trade union in Japan

The Zenroren National Union of General Workers (Japanese: 全労連・全国一般労働組合, Zenroren Zenkokuippan) is a general union in Japan. Its origins lie in the National Union of General Workers (Zenkokuippan), an affiliate of the General Council of Trade Unions of Japan (Sohyo). In 1989, Sohyo merged into the Japanese Trade Union Confederation, to the chagrin of a substantial minority of members who split away from Zenkokuippan to form a new National Union of General Workers, 35,203 members strong, which affiliated with the National Confederation of Trade Unions (Zenroren). By 2019, membership had fallen to 22,052.
