= Building and Wood Workers' International =

Global union federation

Coordinates: 46°11′21″N 6°7′58″E

BWI
- Building and Wood Workers' International
- Founded: December 9, 2005
- Headquarters: Geneva, Switzerland
- Location: International
- Members: 12 million in 135 countries (206)
- Key people: Per-Olof Sjöö, president
- Website: www.bwint.org

The Building and Wood Workers' International (BWI) is the global union federation of democratic and free trade unions in the building, building materials, wood, forestry and allied industries.

== History ==
The federation was established in 2005, by the merger of the International Federation of Building and Wood Workers (IFBWW) and the World Federation of Building and Wood Workers (WFBW). As of 2006, it has 350 member organisations in 135 countries, representing a combined membership of more than 12 million workers.

== Organisation ==
The BWI is based in Geneva, Switzerland. Regional Offices and Project Offices are located in Panama and Malaysia, South Africa, India, Australia, Burkina Faso, Bulgaria, Lebanon, Kenya, South Korea, Russia, Argentina, Peru and Brazil. The organisation works closely with the International Trade Union Confederation (ITUC) and the other global union federations, and has a Special Consultative Status to the Economic and Social Committee of the United Nations.

The BWI holds its World Congress every four years, consisting of delegates from the member organisations. The congress establish set the priorities and strategy for the organisation, and elects the World Council, which meets once a year. As supreme governing body during the intercongress period, it is responsible for all policies and operations of the BWI. The World Council subsequently appoints a World Board, which is responsible for the administration of the BWI and for the implementation of its policies. The World Board meets twice a year.

The organisation's headquarters is located in Geneva, in Switzerland.

In October 2024 the organization that worked with FIFA in the past, placed a complaint against them, regarding what they called "an epidemic of abuses" against migrant employees in Saudi Arabia. This adds up to a leading group of lawyers claiming FIFA did not engage with them regarding human rights in Saudi Arabia. Furthermore, 100 women footballers sent an open letter to FIFA about the same issue.

== Leadership ==
=== General Secretaries ===
2005: Anita Normark
2009: Hör Ambet Yuson

=== Presidents ===
2005: Klaus Wiesehügel
2013: Per-Olof Sjöö
