= World Federation of Building and Woodworkers' Unions =

- Fédération Mondiale des Organisations de la Construction et du Bois
- Founded: September 9, 1937; 88 years ago
- Dissolved: December 2005; 20 years ago
- Headquarters: 31 rue de Treves, Brussels
- Location: International
- Affiliations: World Confederation of Labour

The World Federation of Building and Woodworkers' Unions (French: Fédération Mondiale des Organisations de la Construction et du Bois, FMCB) was an International Trade Federation affiliated to the World Confederation of Labour (WCL).

== History ==
The federation was established on 9 September 1937, at a meeting in Paris, when the International Federation of Christian Woodworkers merged with the International Federation of Christian Workers in the Building Trades. Initially known as the International Federation of Christian Trade Unions of Building and Woodworkers, it adopted its final name in 1973.

In December 2005, the federation merged with the International Federation of Building and Wood Workers, to form the Building and Wood Workers' International.

== Affiliates ==
In 1979, the following unions were affiliated, alongside 17 unions in Latin America with a total of 33,267 members:

Union	Country	Membership
Autonomous South Tyrolean Trade Union	Italy	1,000
Christian Fraction of the Union of Construction and Woodworkers	Austria	16,500
Christian Union of Building and Woodworkers of Germany	Germany	1,560
Christian Union of Woodworkers and Building Workers	Belgium	183,000
Christian Wood and Construction Workers' Union of Switzerland	Switzerland	16,500
Fédération nationale des syndicats chrétiens des industries du bátiment, des TP et assimilés	Canada	10,000
Mauritius Workers Federation	Mauritius	980
Swiss Federation of Protestant Trade Unions	Switzerland	2,000
Trade Union of Manufacturing Industries, Crafts and Construction	Luxembourg	1,200
Wood and Construction Union	Netherlands	42,000

== Leadership ==
=== General Secretaries ===
J. van Eibergen
1964: D. H. Grasman
1970s: H. Koenveld
1980s: Gerrit de Lange
1990s: Dick van de Kamp
2000s: Bert van der Spek

=== Presidents ===
Kamiel Nuyts
1970s: René Maris
1980s: Antoon Desloovere
1998: Jacky Jackers
