= National Union of General Workers (Sohyo) =

Trade union in Japan

The National Union of General Workers (Japanese: 全国一般労働組合, Zenkoku Ippan) was a general union in Japan.

The union was established in 1955 and affiliated to the General Council of Trade Unions of Japan (Sohyo). By 1967, it had 101,200 members. In 1983, its membership was described as "taxi drivers, salesmen, clerks in small bookstores and supermarkets, and the like".

In 1989, the union affiliated to the Japanese Trade Union Confederation, but a substantial minority of members disagreed with this, and split away to form the Zenroren National Union of General Workers. By 1996, the union was down to 60,096 members. In 2006, it merged into the All-Japan Prefectural and Municipal Workers' Union.
