= Swedish Wood Industry Workers' Union =

Trade union in Sweden

The Swedish Wood Industry Workers' Union (Swedish: Svenska Träindustriarbetareförbundet, STIAF or Trä) was a trade union representing wood workers in Sweden.

The union was founded on 1 January 1924, when the Swedish Wood Workers' Union was split in two. Like its predecessor, it affiliated to the Swedish Trade Union Confederation. By the end of 1924, it had 8,920 members, and it grew steadily. The Swedish Cooperage Union merged in during 1936, followed in 1949 by the Swedish Sawmill Industry Workers' Union, and in 1962 by the saddlery section of the Swedish Saddlemakers' and Upholsterers' Union.

Membership of the union peaked at 70,261 in 1979, then gradually declined. By 1997, it had fallen to only 49,964. In 1998, it merged with the Swedish Forest Workers' Union, to form the Swedish Forest and Wood Workers' Union.
