= Swedish Forest and Wood Workers' Union =

Trade union in Sweden

Skogs- och Träfacket
- Swedish Forest and Wood Workers' Union
- Skogs- och Träfacket
- Merged into: GS
- Founded: 1998
- Dissolved: June 1, 2009
- Headquarters: Stockholm
- Location: Sweden
- Members: 55,000
- Key people: Kjell Dahlström, president
- Affiliations: LO
- Website: www.skogstrafacket.org

The Swedish Forest and Wood Workers' Union (Swedish: Svenska Skogs- och Träfacket, Skogs o Trä) was a trade union representing workers in the forestry and woodworking industries in Sweden.

== History ==
The union was established in 1998, when the Swedish Forest Workers' Union merged with the Swedish Wood Industry Workers' Union. The union's president, Kjell Dahlström, claimed that the merger saved SEK 30 million. Like both its predecessors, the union affiliated to the Swedish Trade Union Confederation. On formation, it had 68,709 members, but this fell rapidly, along with employment in the industry, and by 2008 it had only 39,144 members. In 2009, it merged with the Swedish Graphic Workers' Union, to form GS.
