= Swedish Wood Workers' Union =

Trade union in Sweden

The Swedish Wood Workers' Union (Swedish: Svenska Träarbetareförbundet, Trä) was a trade union representing wood workers in Sweden.

The union was founded in 1889 (137 years ago) as the Wood Workers' Union of Sweden, and had 880 members by the end of the year. It grew rapidly, and although the Swedish Building Wood Workers' Union split away in 1904, it rejoined in 1916. The union affiliated to the Swedish Trade Union Confederation, and by 1923, it had 16,177 members. The following year, it was split into the Swedish Wood Industry Workers' Union, and a new Swedish Building Wood Workers' Union.

== Presidents ==
1889: Rasmus Hansen
1894: Herman Lindqvist
1900: Sven Persson
1904: Arvid Thorborg
1908: Nils Linde
