= Herman Lindqvist (politician) =

Swedish politician

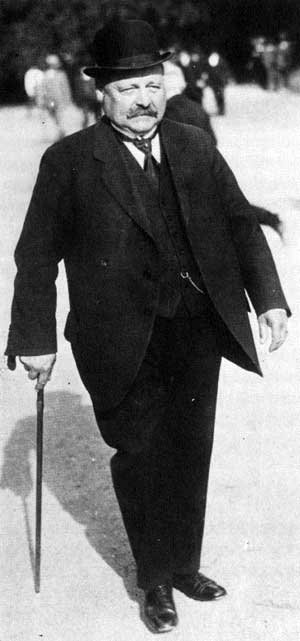
Herman Lindqvist in 1930

Herman Lindqvist (born 1863, Arboga, d. 1932) was a Swedish Social Democratic politician and trade union organizer. By profession he was a furniture carpenter, and belonged to the Swedish Wood Workers' Union. He was the president of Swedish Wood Workers' Union 1894–1900 and the chairman of the Swedish Trade Union Confederation 1900–1920.
