= IndustriALL Global Union =

Global union federation

- Founded: 19 June 2012
- Headquarters: Geneva, Switzerland
- Location: International
- Members: 50 million
- Key people: Marie Nilsson, president Atle Høie, general secretary
- Affiliations: Council of Global Unions
- Website: www.industriall-union.org

IndustriALL Global Union is a global union federation, founded in Copenhagen on 19 June 2012.

IndustriALL Global Union represents more than 50 million working people in more than 140 countries, working across the supply chains in mining, energy and manufacturing sectors at the global level.

== History ==
The IndustriALL Global Union formed as the result of a merger between three former global union federations:

- IMF, International Metalworkers' Federation
- ICEM, International Federation of Chemical, Energy, Mine and General Workers' Unions
- ITGLWF, International Textile, Garment and Leather Workers' Federation

European affiliates of IndustriALL Global Union are members of the IndustriAll – European Trade Union.

IndustriALL is an international union confederation made up of approximately 800 unions in 140 countries. The organisation's goals are:

- Defend workers' rights
- Build union power
- Confront global capital
- Fight precarious work
- Promote sustainable industrial policy

A major part of the organisation's work is building international company networks, where union activists from different countries who work for the same company can meet and share strategies.

In 2024, Russian authorities designated IndustriALL as an "undesirable organization."

== Bangladesh Accord ==
IndustriALL represents workers in the garment and textile sector. After the Rana Plaza industrial disaster, when a building collapse killed 1,134 people, IndustriALL and UNI Global Union negotiated the Bangladesh Accord. The Accord is a legally binding safety and inspection mechanism for garment and textile factories in Bangladesh. The Accord was signed by more than 200 brands who source from Bangladesh. The agreement was renewed in 2017.

== Living wage campaign ==
Poverty wages have a devastating impact on workers; in Cambodia thousands of malnourished workers have fainted in the last 2 years and in Bangladesh workers are being forced to survive on a dollar a day.

From Africa to Asia and Latin America the Living Wage is a global issue and central to the Decent Work Agenda. IndustriALL is campaigning on this issue with its affiliates.

== Global Framework Agreements ==
GFAs are negotiated on a global level between trade unions and a multinational company and serve to protect the interests of workers across a multinational company's operations. They put in place the very best standards of trade union rights, health, safety and environmental practices, and quality of work principles across a company's global operations, regardless of whether those standards exist in an individual country.

IndustriALL prioritizes establishing, monitoring and improving GFAs with multinational companies, including Volkswagen, Inditex, Gamesa, Siemens and AngloGold.

== Leadership ==
=== General Secretaries ===
2012: Jyrki Raina
2016: Valter Sanches
2021: Atle Høie

=== Presidents ===
2012: Berthold Huber
2016: Jörg Hofmann
2023: Marie Nilsson

=== Other leaders ===
- Vice-presidents: Issa Aremu, Tahar Berberi, Raul Enrique Mathiu, Anders Ferbe, Carol Landry, Yasunobu Aihara
- Assistants of General Secretary: Atle Høie, Kemal Özkan, Jenny Holdcroft

== See also ==
- Volkswagen worker organizations
- Apple worker organizations
