= Swedish Trade Union Confederation =

Organization of trade unions in Sweden

- Landsorganisationen i Sverige (LO)
- Founded: 7 August 1898; 128 years ago
- Headquarters: Stockholm, Sweden
- Location: Sweden
- Members: 1.23 million
- Key people: Johan Lindholm, president
- Affiliations: ITUC, ETUC, SAMAK
- Website: www.lo.se

The Swedish Trade Union Confederation (Swedish: Landsorganisationen i Sverige, (Note: Swedish pronunciation: [ˈlânː(d)sɔrɡanɪsaˌɧuːnɛn iː ˈsvæ̌rjɛ]) lit. 'The National Organisation in Sweden'), commonly referred to as LO, (Note: Swedish pronunciation: [ˈɛ̂lːuː]) is a national trade union centre, an umbrella organisation for thirteen Swedish trade unions that organise mainly "blue-collar" workers. The Confederation, which gathers around 1.5 million employees out of Sweden's 10 million people population, was founded in 1898 by blue-collar unions on the initiative of the 1897 Scandinavian Labour Congress and the Swedish Social Democratic Party, which almost exclusively was made up by trade unions. In 2019 union density of Swedish blue-collar workers was 60%, a decline by seventeen percentage points since 2006 when blue-collar union density was 77%. A strong contributing factor was the considerably raised fees to union unemployment funds in January 2007 made by the new centre-right Reinfeldt cabinet.

== Organisation ==
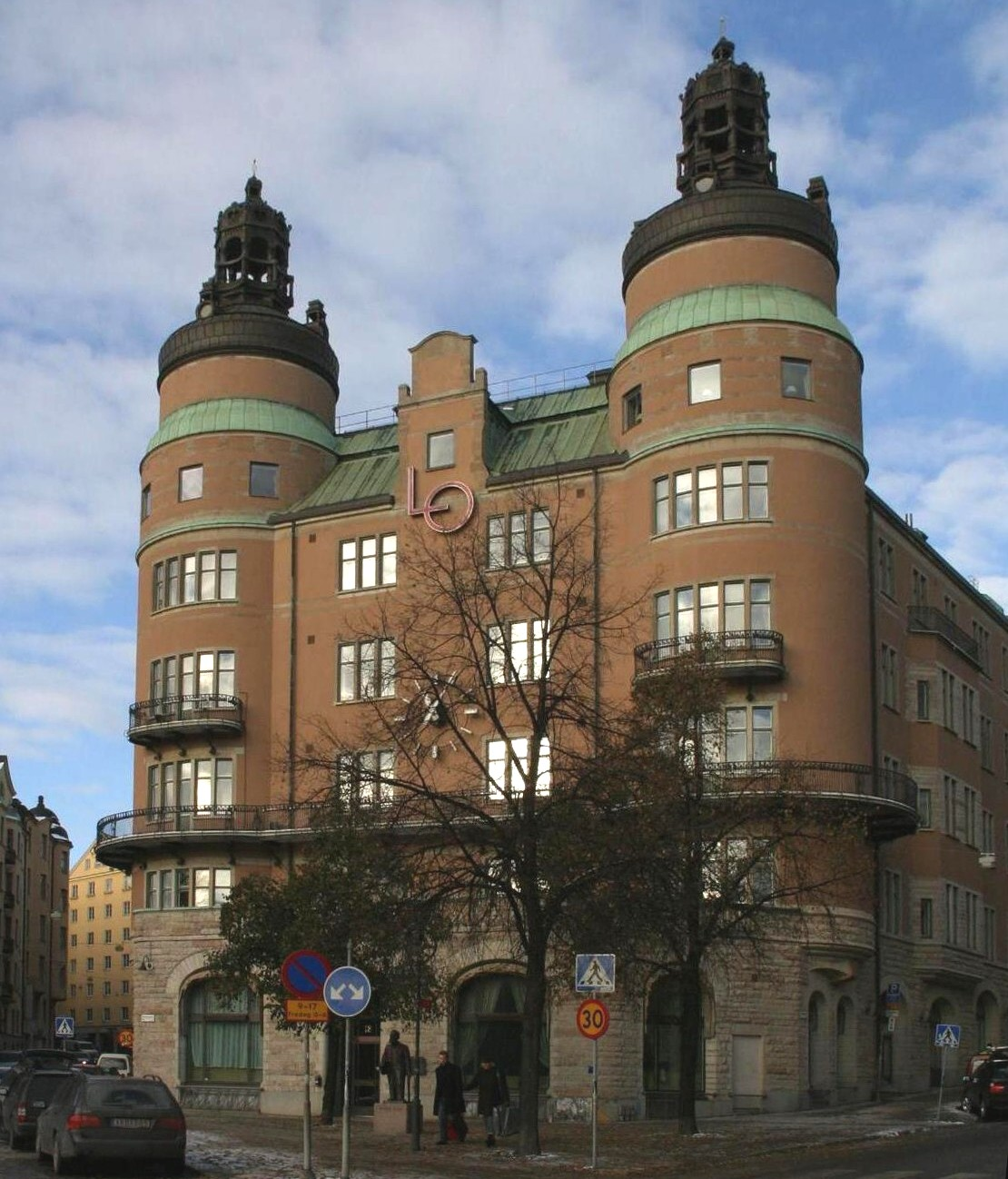
LO-borgen (English: 'the LO-castle'), the landmark LO headquarters building by Swedish architect Ferdinand Boberg, at Norra Bantorget in Stockholm. 59°20′8.9″N 18°3′17.2″E

The thirteen affiliates of the Swedish Trade Union Confederation span both the private and the public sector. The member unions are fully independent, with the role of the Confederation limited to the co-ordination of wage bargaining, international activities, trade union education and other areas. Another important task is to promote the organisation's views to decision-makers and the general public. It also has representatives on the governing bodies of many government authorities. The Confederation is also responsible for research and signing labour market insurance schemes. The member unions, however, carry the responsibility for the administration of the unemployment insurance funds.

While its Danish sister organisation, the Danish Confederation of Trade Unions, cut its formal ties to the country's Social Democratic party in 1995, the Swedish Trade Union Confederation maintains a strong cooperation with the Social Democrats. Although the organisations are independent from each other, the Swedish Trade Union Confederation has a representative on the party's executive committee elected by the Party Congress. Also, both the Confederation and the member unions contribute substantial amounts of money to the party.

Until 1987 there was a system of collective membership in the Social Democratic Party for members in the confederation, in which the local union could apply for membership in the Social Democratic Party, effectively enrolling all its members into the Social Democratic Party. (An individual could decline to be part of this collective membership.)

In 1942, the confederation started publishing the evening newspaper Aftontidningen, intended to serve as a social democratic counterweight to Aftonbladet, known for its sympathies with Nazi Germany. In 1956, Aftonbladet along with Stockholms-Tidningen was acquired by confederation, changing their political profiles to social democracy. In 1996, it sold 49.9 percent of the stocks in Aftonbladet to Norwegian media company Schibsted. In 2009 Schibsted acquired an additional 41.1 percent of the stocks, making the confederation a minority owner with 9 percent of the stocks. However, an agreement was made as a part of the sales deal, ensuring that the confederation would continue their influence over the political stance of the editorial page, preserving Aftonbladets social democratic profile.

The number of member unions has been reduced by mergers. Most recently the Swedish Painters' Union merged into the Swedish Building Workers' Union in May 2024

== Affiliates ==
=== Current affiliates ===
Membership of LO affiliates (31 December 2018)
Union	Abbreviation	Founded	Men	Women	Total	Change (2017)
Swedish Building Workers' Union	Byggnads	1949	77 512	1 218	78 730	▲409
Swedish Electricians' Union	SEF	1906	18 518	456	18 974	▼333
Swedish Building Maintenance Workers' Union	Fastighets	1936	13 624	12 700	26 324	▼718
GS	GS	2009	31 987	6 861	38 848	▼1 096
Swedish Commercial Employees' Union	Handels	1906	45 665	77 672	123 337	▼1 001
Swedish Hotel and Restaurant Workers' Union	HRF	1918	10 949	16 017	26 966	▼921
IF Metall	IF Metal	2006	200 292	46 543	246 835	▼305
Swedish Municipal Workers' Union	Kommunal	1910	108 426	391 728	500 154	▼7 333
Swedish Food Workers' Union	Livs	1922	15 317	8 041	23 358	▼1 062
Swedish Paper Workers' Union	Pappers	1920	11 722	2 190	13 912	▼370
Swedish Union for Service and Communications Employees	Seko	1970	53 981	18 175	72 156	▼960
Swedish Musicians' Union	SMF	1907	1 805	469	2 274	▼13
Swedish Transport Workers' Union	Transport	1897	41 494	8 343	49 837	▼1 889
TOTAL			641 125	591 690	1 232 815	▼15 575

=== Former affiliates ===
Union	Abbreviation	Founded	Left	Reason not affiliated	Membership (1910)	Membership (1954)
Swedish Painters' Union	Målarna	1887	2024	Merged into Byggnads	—N/a	
Employees' Union of State Power Stations	KPF	1921	1970	Merged into SEKO	—N/a	1,173
State Hospital Personnel Union	SSF	1908	1967	Merged into Kommunal	347	7,928
Stockholm Union of Sculptors		1896	1910	Dissolved	32	—N/a
Swedish Agricultural Workers' Union	SLF	1908	2001	Merged into Kommunal	1,752	38,980
Swedish Bakery and Confectionery Workers' Union	Bageri	1896	1922	Merged into Livs	3,168	—N/a
Swedish Boilermakers' Union	SDF	1903	1948	Merged into Fabriks	154	—N/a
Swedish Bookbinders' Union	SBbaf	1893	1973	Merged into GF	1,176	11,391
Swedish Brewery Industry Workers' Union	SBiaf	1899	1965	Merged into Livs	2,045	7,939
Swedish Bricklayers' Union	Murare	1890	1961	Merged into Byggnads	4,082	15,594
Swedish Building Wood Workers' Union	Btaf	1924	1949	Merged into Byggnads	—N/a	
Swedish Butchers' Union	Slakteri	1904	1922	Merged into Livs	321	—N/a
Swedish Chimney Sweeps' Union	SSf	1919	1981	Merged into Kommunal	—N/a	963
Swedish Civil Administration's Employees' Union	CPF	1905	1970	Merged into SEKO	220	6,676
Swedish Clothing Workers' Union	SBaf	1889	1972	Merged into Beklädnads	2,091	37,959
Swedish Cooperage Union	Tunnbinderi	1892	1936	Merged into Trä	314	—N/a
Swedish Defence Forces Civilian Employees' Union	FCPF	1917	1970	Merged into SEKO	—N/a	20,016
Swedish Factory Workers' Union	Fabriks	1891	1993	Merged into IF	20,195	63,086
Swedish Forest and Wood Workers' Union	Skogs- o Trä	1998	2009	Merged into GS	—N/a	
Swedish Forest Workers' Union	SSAF	1918	1998	Merged into Skogs- o Trä	—N/a	36,486
Swedish Foundry Workers' Union	Gjutare	1893	1964	Merged into Metall	2,588	11,408
Swedish Gilders' and Glaziers' Union	Förgylleri o Glas	1900	1913	Dissolved	282	—N/a
Swedish Graphic Workers' Union	GF	1973	2009	Merged into GS	—N/a	
Swedish Industrial Union	IF	1993	2006	Merged into IF Metall	—N/a	
Swedish Hairdressers' Union	FAF	1906	1989	Merged into Handels	46	4,407
Swedish Hat and Fur Workers' Union	Hatt o Päls	1922	1933	Merged into SBaf	—N/a	
Swedish Hat Workers' Union	Hatt	1903	1922	Merged into Hatt o Päls	117	—N/a
Swedish Lithographic Union	Litograf	1904	1973	Merged into GF	240	4,712
Swedish Metalworkers' Union	Metall	1888	2006	Merged into IF Metall	30,826	234,157
Swedish Miners' Union	Gruv	1895	1994	Merged into Metall	2,442	11,939
Swedish Post Union	SPF	1886	1970	Merged into SEKO	2,658	17,986
Swedish Prison Employees' Union	Vårdpers	1906	1970	Merged into SEKO	496	1,557
Swedish Pulp Operators' Union	SP	1920	1946	Merged into Pappers	—N/a	
Swedish Railway Employees' Union	SJMF	1899	1970	Merged into SEKO	18,022	64,834
Swedish Road Workers' Union	SVaf	1914	1970	Merged into SEKO	—N/a	16,640
Swedish Saddlemakers' and Upholsterers' Union	SSoT	1890	1962	Dissolved	666	5,573
Swedish Sailors' Union	SSF	1932	1996	Merged into SEKO	—N/a	14,487
Swedish Saw Mill Industry Workers Union	Sågverks	1897	1949	Merged into SSAF	3,732	—N/a
Swedish Sheet Metal Workers' Union	SBOP	1893	2000	Merged into Byggnads	1,512	3,505
Swedish Shoe and Leather Workers' Union	SSoL	1888	1972	Merged into Beklädnads	3,528	10,882
Swedish Social Insurance Employees' and Insurance Agents' Union	FF	1918	2002	Disaffiliated	—N/a	7,947
Swedish Stone Industry Workers' Union	Sten	1897	1970	Dissolved	3,053	5,328
Swedish Stucco Workers' Union	Stuckatör	1904	1948	Dissolved	53	—N/a
Swedish Tele Union	SvT	1901	1970	Merged into SEKO	705	20,718
Swedish Textile, Garment and Leather Workers' Union	Beklädnads	1972	1993	Merged into IF	—N/a	
Swedish Textile Workers' Union	Textil	1898	1972	Merged into Beklädnads	3,443	41,864
Swedish Tile and Slab Workers' Union	SKoP	1891	1946	Merged into Fabriks	428	—N/a
Swedish Tobacco Industry Workers' Union	Tobaks	1889	1964	Merged into Livs	1,910	1,784
Swedish Typographers' Union	Typograf	1886	1973	Merged into GF	4,022	15,804
Swedish Wood Industry Workers' Union	Trä	1924	1998	Merged into Skogs- o Trä	—N/a	60,321
Swedish Wood Workers' Union	Trä	1889	1924	Dissolved	7,972	—N/a
Union of Waiters of the Göteborgssystem in Stockholm	GSSF	1905	1910	Dissolved	125	—N/a
United Unions	DFF	1905	1962	Dissolved	1,707	14,687

== List of chairmen ==
- Fredrik Sterky, 1898–1900
- Herman Lindqvist, 1900–1920
- Arvid Thorberg, 1920–1930
- Edvard Johanson, 1930–1936
- Albert Forslund, February–September 1936
- August Lindberg, 1936–1947
- Axel Strand, 1947–1956
- Arne Geijer, 1956–1973
- Gunnar Nilsson, 1973–1983
- Stig Malm, 1983–1993
- Bertil Jonsson, 1994–2000
- Wanja Lundby-Wedin, 2000–2012
- Karl-Petter Thorwaldsson, 2012–2020
- Susanna Gideonsson, 2020–2024
- Johan Lindholm, 2024–present

== See also ==
- Danish Confederation of Trade Unions (Danish LO)
- Norwegian Confederation of Trade Unions (Norwegian LO)
- Swedish Confederation of Professional Employees (TCO)
- Swedish Confederation of Professional Associations (SACO)
- Central Organisation of the Workers of Sweden (SAC; Swedish trade union not connected to LO)
- Rehn–Meidner Model
