= George Furness =

English Victorian construction engineer and benefactor

- Born: 31 October 1820; Great Longstone, Derbyshire, England
- Died: 9 January 1900 (aged 79); Roundwood House, Willesden, London, England
- Spouse: Sarah Rebecca
- Children: George James Furness, Mary Woodwis Furness, Mathew Thomas Bladen Furness, Agnes Sophia Furness, George John Furness, John Furness, Sarah Furness.
- Engineering career
- Discipline: Public Works
- Awards: Knight of the Order of the Crown of Italy

George Furness (31 October 1820 – 9 January 1900) was an English Victorian construction engineer and benefactor. He described himself as a "contractor of public works". He worked all around the world, on railways, drainage, and brickwork among numerous other things.

== Birth ==
Furness was born in Great Longstone, Derbyshire. The old Croft House was part of the Furness' property there.

== Career ==
George Furness did a wide variety of jobs and contracts throughout his life, both overseas and local.

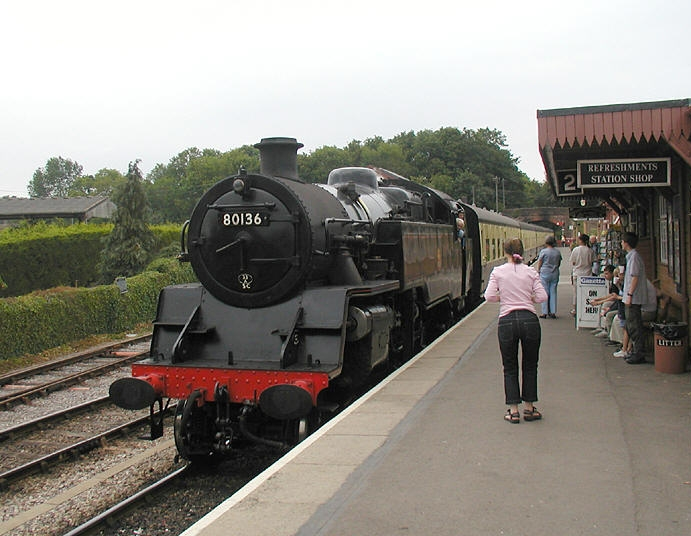
West Somerset Railway

=== Railway ===
In the early 19th century, the railway was born in Britain. Furness took advantage of this new type of business; from 1842 onwards, he worked on the construction of major railways in the Midlands, Western and Southern counties of England. Among those he contributed to were:

- Abingdon Railway, opened in 1856
- Redditch Railway, opened in 1859
- West Somerset Railway, open in 1862
- Isle of Grain to Port Victoria (Kent), opened in 1882

Some of these still exist.

Ribbon of the Order of the Crown of Italy

=== Overseas work ===
When Britain was at the forefront of construction and engineering, specialists where in great demand overseas for their skills. Furness, being one of these skilled workers, was involved in overseas construction works in Brazil and France.

His other specialty was public works. He worked on extensive dredging contracts in Italy (Spezia, Ancona, Livorno and Palermo) for the next 30 years of his life. King Victor Emmanuel III made him a Knight of the Order of the Crown of Italy.

His main work, though, was in Odessa, Russia. After the Crimean War, specialists were needed to renew public works. There, he worked on drainage, paving, and general restorations, along with numerous other works. The overall cost for these labours totalled £750,000.

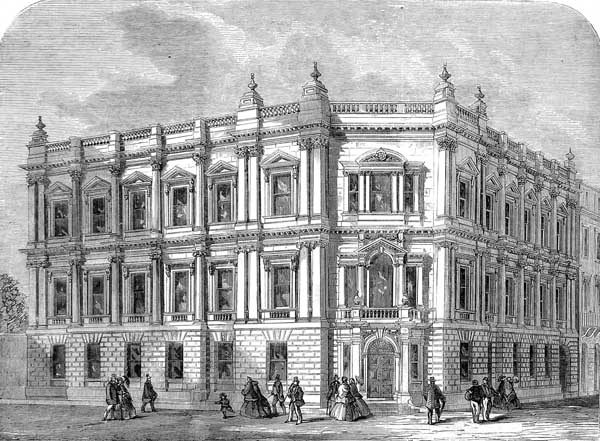
The Metropolitan Board of Works' headquarters in Spring Gardens

=== Drainage ===
Halfway through the 19th century, the rapid growth of population and the poor state of public works in London caused high pollution of the River Thames. In 1856, the Metropolitan Board of Works was formed and was put in charge of constructing London's first sewage system.

Furness bid for the major section of the Thames Embankment (from Westminster to Waterloo Bridge) and won the contract for £520,000. The work began in 1864. Despite slow progress created by friction with his partner, problems with materials, and also financial difficulties, his large section of the embankment was complete by 1870.

His other, and somewhat smaller, contract was the Northern Lower Level Sewer Isle of Dogs Branch, in 1865, valued at £75,456.

=== Brickwork ===
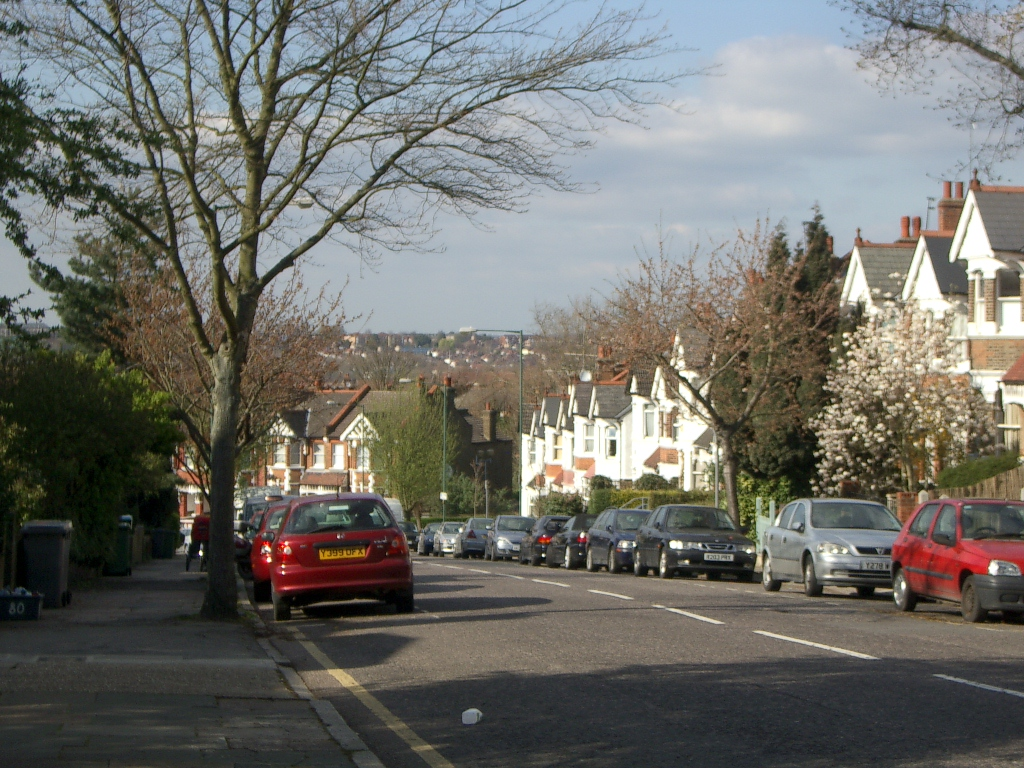
Chambers Lane, where the brickworks factory used to be

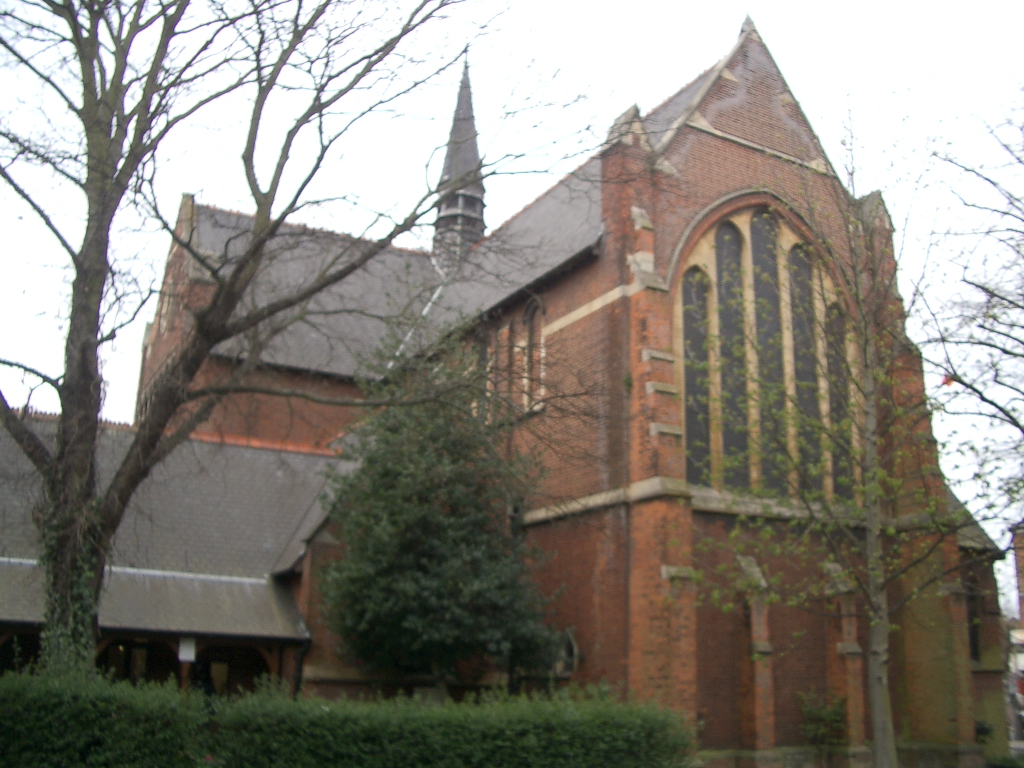
St. Andrew Church, which was built with Furness' bricks

In the 1870s, a sudden explosion of the construction of houses in Willesden and surrounding areas motivated Furness to form the Willesden Brick and Tile Company, situated on Chambers Lane.

Soon after, an approximately 140-foot (43 m)-high square chimney puffed steam and smoke, from many kilns, over the surrounding area. The machinery was powered by a steam engine. It manufactured high-quality, and therefore expensive, durable red bricks. It also made cheaper brown stock bricks. Furness bought large plots of land in the area for his works. These were developed, from pasture land, into residential premises, providing houses, roads and drainage to the whole community.

Many houses, made from these bricks, still house the current Willesden's residents. These include some houses on Ashford Road, Cedar Road, Cricklewood Broadway, Harlesden Road, Ivy Road, Larch Road, Longstone Terrace, Mora Road, Pine Road, and Taylors Lane

Furness' bricks were used to erect St. Andrew Church. Schools in Willesden, a number of other churches, along with a school in the surrounding areas also benefited from his brickfactory. The Brick and Tile Company also produced vases, flower pots, drain pipes, glazed bricks, and roof tiles.

Furness became one of Willesden's major employers. Many company houses were provided to rent out to employees; those on Parkfield Road are an example.

== Family ==
Furness married Sarah Rebecca (1835 – 1902) in his early forties and they moved into the Roundwood House in 1856, an Elizabethan-style mansion, which was originally built around 1836 for Lord Decies.

His children were, in order of birth:

- George John Furness (1865, aged 2 days)
- Mary Woodwis Furness (1866 – 1902, aged 36 years)
- George James Furness (1868 – 1935, aged 67 years), who was member of parliament for the constituency of Willesden West on behalf of the Conservative party from 1922-1923.
- Matthew Thomas Bladen Furness (1870 – 1902, aged 32 years)
- John Furness (1871, aged 1 month)
- Sarah Furness (1872, aged 17 days)
- Agnes Sophia Furness (1876 – 1899, aged 23 years)

Three of their children did not manage to survive infancy.

After Furness completed his overseas work, he remained in England to do the remainder of his labours. Living in Willesden, he was able to spend more time with his family. His eldest son, George James Furness, attended the Crystal Palace School of Engineering as a teenager, graduated to become an engineer, and worked with his father.

Roundwood House remained part of their property from till 1936. The old Croft House in Great Longstone, Derbyshire (Furness' hometown), continued to remain among their property.

== Public figure ==
Despite having many overseas contracts, Furness still managed to have some time for the local community and its affairs.

=== Boards and Councils ===
When Willesden Local Board was formed in 1875 (before this, the district had been administered by the local Vestry meeting), Furness was elected to represent West Willesden and hence became the first chairman. Later on, he represented South Kilburn and East Willesden.

Furness was elected as one of the first representatives to the Middlesex County Council in 1889. He also sat on the Hendon Board of Guardians for many years, and was one of the original members of the School Board.

=== Churches ===
For three years, he was the people's churchwarden at St. Mary Church, where he was putting his practical knowledge to good uses.

=== Hospitals ===
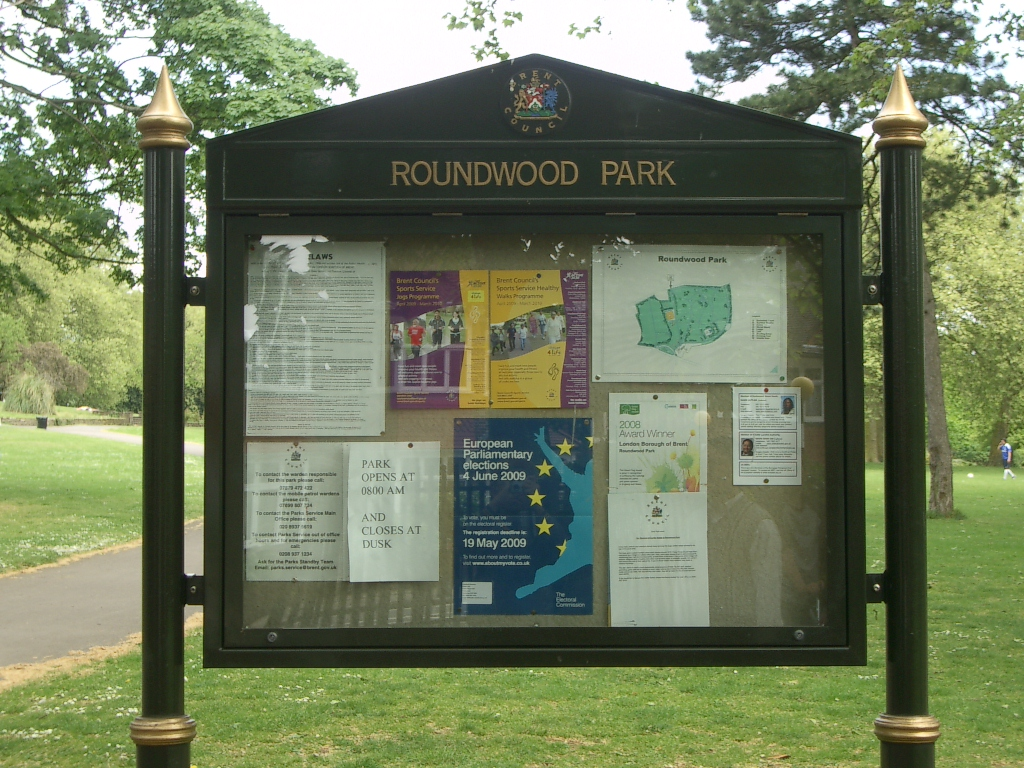
Roundwood Park, originally Knowle Hill or Hunger Hill Common Field

Concerning hospitals, he financially supported the Willesden Cottage Hospital. He was also a governor at St. Mary Hospital.

=== Parks ===
In 1892, Furness sold the 26 acres (110,000 m^{2}) of Knowles Hill, also known as Hunger Hill Common Field, to the Local Board for a bargain price of £14,500. At this time, it was only a small hillock and some elm and oak trees. This eventually became, after much work by Oliver Claude Robson (Surveyor for the Willesden Local Board and later Willesden Urban District Council), the Roundwood Park today, situated in Willesden.

== Death ==
=== Final years ===
The family grave of George Furness

Furness' youngest daughter, Agnes Sophia, was murdered by her husband in India in 1899. She was buried in Bandora Churchyard, in Bombei, India. Since that time, Furness' health began to decline, as he suffered from bronchitis and influenza.

On 9 January 1900, George Furness, aged 79, died at Roundwood House, Willesden. He is interred in the churchyard of St. Mary Church, Willesden.

His obituary stated: "In public affairs his tenacity of purpose, liberal views, and ready regard for divergent opinions were as noticeable in his private and professional life." His will was proved on 9 February, the value of his estate being £303,826 the equivalent of more than £31 million in 2025.

=== Aftermath ===
In May 1902, Sarah Rebecca, Mary Woodwis, and Matthew Thomas Bladen were all drowned in a boating accident on the Lakes of Killarney, in Ireland. Only the body of Sarah Rebecca was recovered, and her corpse was brought back to Willesden and buried next to her husband.

George James, Furness' eldest son and only surviving heir, carried on the tradition of his father in Willesden. He sat on the Middlesex County Council and was a JP, MP for West Willesden from 1922 to 1923 and High Sheriff of Middlesex. After his death in 1936, his family decided to move out of Willesden. He was buried in St Mary's Church, across the path from his father and mother.

Roundwood House was sold to Willesden District Council on that same year. It no longer stands today because it was destroyed. The brickwork factory was also sold and demolished.

=== Grave ===
On George Furness' family grave in St Mary Church are the names of all the George Furness family (except George James Furness). The words for George Furness are as follows:

=== Legacy ===
Furness Road, in courtesy of George Furness

For his contribution to the local community, a road was named after him. It remains to this day; Furness Road. There is also a school named Furness Primary School on that road.

Other roads in the immediate vicinity of Furness Road are also named after his key areas of activity: Ancona Road; Spezia Road; Palermo Road and Odessa Road; all adjacent to Furness Road.

Additionally, a block of flats is called George Furness House. They stand on Grange Road.
