= Amalgamated Society of Woodworkers =

Former trade union of the United Kingdom

- Merged into: Amalgamated Society of Woodworkers and Painters
- Founded: 1 January 1921
- Dissolved: 1 July 1970
- Headquarters: 9–11 Macaulay Road, Clapham, London
- Location: United Kingdom
- Members: 198,000 (1956)
- Publication: Woodworkers' Journal
- Affiliations: TUC, ITUC

The Amalgamated Society of Woodworkers (ASW) was a British trade union representing carpenters, joiners and allied trades. The ASW was formed in 1921 by the amalgamation of two smaller unions. It was itself merged into the Union of Construction, Allied Trades and Technicians in 1971.

== History ==
The ASW was formed in 1921 through the merger of two rival unions: the Amalgamated Society of Carpenters, Cabinetmakers and Joiners and the General Union of Carpenters and Joiners. In 1922, most of its Irish members left to form the Irish National Union of Woodworkers.

The ASW had 176,000 members by 1945, making it the seventh largest union in Britain. Its membership rose to 198,000 by 1956. In 1965, the National Union of Packing Case Makers (Wood and Tin), Box Makers, Sawyers and Mill Workers merged into the ASW.

On 1 July 1970 the ASW was merged with Amalgamated Society of Painters and Decorators and the Association of Building Technicians to form the Amalgamated Society of Woodworkers and Painters. One year later the new union was itself merged with Amalgamated Union of Building Trade Workers to become the Amalgamated Society of Woodworkers Painters and Builders (ASWPB). At the end of 1971 the ASWPB was renamed the Union of Construction, Allied Trades and Technicians (UCATT).

== Election results ==
The union sponsored a large number of Labour Party candidates, many of whom won election.

Election	Constituency	Candidate	Votes	Percentage	Position
1922 general election	Birmingham Yardley	Archibald Gossling	11,234	41.9	2
1922 general election	Chippenham	William Robert Roberts	1,098	05.1	3
1922 general election	Stockport	James C. H. Robinson	16,126	15.8	4
1922 general election	Walthamstow West	Valentine McEntee	8,758	43.3	1
1922 general election	Willesden West	Samuel Viant	12,529	48.5	2
1922 general election	Wycombe	Samuel Stennett	4,403	14.1	3
1923 general election	Birmingham Yardley	Archibald Gossling	11,562	46.5	2
1923 general election	Manchester Hulme	Andrew McElwee	8,433	30.0	3
1923 general election	Nuneaton	Thomas Barron	10,437	29.1	3
1923 general election	Rotherham	Fred Lindley	16,983	53.9	1
1923 general election	Walthamstow West	Valentine McEntee	10,026	47.6	1
1923 general election	Willesden West	Samuel Viant	14,004	51.3	1
1924 general election	Birmingham Yardley	Archibald Gossling	14,184	46.8	2
1924 general election	Manchester Hulme	Andrew McElwee	13,070	41.2	2
1924 general election	Montrose Burghs	Thomas Barron	6,914	42.8	2
1924 general election	Rotherham	Fred Lindley	18,860	54.6	1
1924 general election	Walthamstow West	Valentine McEntee	12,621	49.1	2
1924 general election	Willesden West	Samuel Viant	14,884	47.3	1
1929 general election	Birmingham Yardley	Archibald Gossling	23,956	48.8	1
1929 general election	Glasgow Partick	Adam McKinlay	13,110	45.5	1
1929 general election	Manchester Hulme	Andrew McElwee	15,053	43.8	1
1929 general election	Rotherham	Fred Lindley	26,937	60.4	1
1929 general election	Walthamstow West	Valentine McEntee	16,050	54.0	1
1929 general election	Willesden West	Samuel Viant	20,583	52.3	1
1931 general election	Birmingham Yardley	Archibald Gossling	16,640	33.8	2
1931 general election	Glasgow Partick	Adam McKinlay	11,252	37.3	2
1931 general election	Rotherham	Fred Lindley	22,834	49.2	2
1931 general election	Walthamstow West	Valentine McEntee	14,144	45.1	1
1931 general election	Willesden West	Samuel Viant	15,550	39.4	2
1935 general election	Leeds Central	Fred Lindley	13,701	43.6	2
1935 general election	Liverpool Fairfield	Arthur Moody	11,155	37.5	2
1935 general election	Walthamstow West	Valentine McEntee	17,613	61.8	1
1935 general election	Willesden West	Samuel Viant	19,402	45.9	2
1945 general election	Leeds Central	George Porter	13,370	57.1	1
1945 general election	Liverpool Exchange	Bessie Braddock	8,494	52.0	1
1945 general election	Walthamstow West	Valentine McEntee	17,460	65.2	1
1945 general election	Willesden West	Samuel Viant	26,566	72.2	1
1950 general election	Gateshead East	Arthur Moody	15,249	45.1	1
1950 general election	Leeds Central	George Porter	24,030	60.8	1
1950 general election	Willesden West	Samuel Viant	33,963	61.1	1
1951 general election	Gateshead East	Arthur Moody	19,525	57.7	1
1951 general election	Leeds Central	George Porter	23,967	62.4	1
1951 general election	Willesden West	Samuel Viant	35,296	64.3	1
1955 general election	Gateshead East	Arthur Moody	21,653	56.5	1
1955 general election	Willesden West	Samuel Viant	29,185	61.8	1
1959 general election	Bradford North	John Marshall	20,179	46.9	2
1959 general election	Canterbury	George Peters	15,746	33.8	2
1959 general election	Gateshead East	Arthur Moody	25,319	58.9	1
1964 general election	Ripon	Peter O'Grady	7,341	21.8	3
1966 general election	Liverpool Walton	Eric Heffer	20,590	57.3	1
1970 general election	Liverpool Walton	Eric Heffer	21,452	53.6	1

== Leadership ==
=== General Secretaries ===
1921: Alexander Gordon Cameron
1926: Frank Wolstencroft
1948: Jack McDermott
1959: George Smith

=== Assistant General Secretaries ===
1921: Frank Wolstencroft
1927: Thomas O. Williams
1947: Jack McDermott
1949: George Smith
1959: W. J. Martin
1962: Les Wood
