= Charles Pinkham (politician) =

English Conservative politician (1853–1938)

- Born: 1853; Underwood, Plympton
- Died: 1938 (aged 84–85)
- Citizenship: United Kingdom
- Occupation: English Conservative politician

Lieutenant-Colonel Charles Pinkham CBE JP DL (1853–1938) was an English Conservative politician at the end of the 19th century and the beginning of the 20th century.

== Biography ==
He was born at Underwood, Plympton, near Plymouth, in 1853, the youngest of four children of an agricultural labourer. He attended the National School at Plympton. His father paid 1d per week for his education.

At 14 he left school and was apprenticed as a carpenter and joiner. In 1872 he ran away from his apprenticeship and went to Glasgow, via Belfast. In Glasgow he immediately obtained work at a journeyman's wages.

In 1876 Pinkham came to London. Again, he immediately found work. From June 1876 to October 1877 he helped rebuild Membland Hall, near Newton Ferrers, Devon. In 1881 he started a construction business with another Devonshire man, from Ipplepen. This was perhaps Charles Langler, with whom Pinkham later collaborated on houses in Kensal Rise, west London, in the early 1890s. The Langler & Pinkham houses in Clifford Gardens, Kensal Rise, are well known for their decorated gables.

In 1888 Pinkham was elected to Willesden Local Board, predecessor to Willesden Urban District Council. He would be chairman of the institution five times, serving on it until 1919, when he stood down after having been elected Unionist M.P. for Willesden West Constituency in the previous year. He had already stood for election in Willesden East in the 1890s.

Pinkham also served on Middlesex County Council from 1898. He was made a Middlesex county alderman in March 1907, and was chairman of the Highways Committee c. 1914 to at least 1924. On 31 August 1920 he became Deputy Lieutenant of Middlesex. For "domestic reasons" he did not stand for West Willesden again in 1922, and the seat went to Labour's Samuel Viant, who also came from Plymouth.

Pinkham was a member of the Metropolitan Water Board from its inception, as well as being a J.P. from 1900, and Deputy Chairman of Willesden Bench from 1912. He had a reputation "for making witty remarks and giving sage advice from the Bench at Willesden" and was reportedly often quoted in the London papers. His portrait was unveiled at Willesden Police Court in 1928.

On 17 July 1914 there was a public presentation to Pinkham on behalf of the residents of Willesden in recognition of his 25 years service on the Local Board and U.D.C. During World War I Pinkham swore in recruits twice a day, and later was chairman of the Local War Tribunal. Both his sons served in the war. He assisted in raising two battalions of the 9th Middlesex (Willesden's Territorial unit, based at Pound Lane, Willesden) and, in 1916, a Volunteer battalion (essentially sort of First World War Home Guard units, the Volunteers were popularly known as the 'Gorgeous Wrecks' because of the G.R., for 'Government Recognition', on their brassards) of which he was honorary colonel. He was allowed to retain his rank after the war. He also raised money for the wounded and was chairman of two local hospitals. Towards the end of the war he was awarded the OBE.

Pinkham was knighted in 1928. In 1930 he was made Sheriff of Middlesex.

He was also chairman of the London Devonian Association and active on its committees. Still capable of talking in Devonian dialect when in the right company, he rarely went on holiday except to Devon.

Charles Pinkham died in 1938.
