= George James Furness =

George James Furness JP
- Born: 29 August 1868; Willesden, London, England
- Died: 11 June 1936 (aged 67); Roundwood House, Willesden, London, England
- Spouse: Mary Mable
- Children: George James Barnard Furness
- Parent: George Furness

Member of Parliament for Willesden West
- In office 15 November 1922 – 16 November 1923
- Preceded by: Charles Pinkham
- Succeeded by: Samuel Viant
- Majority: 799

Personal details
- Party: Unionist Party (UK)

Councillor, Middlesex County Council

High Sheriff of Middlesex
- In office March 1936 – 11 June 1936

George James Furness JP (29 August 1868 – 11 June 1936), was an engineer and scouter, and the member of parliament for the constituency of Willesden West on behalf of the Unionist Party from 1922–1923.

== Scouting ==
In the Boy Scout Association, Furness was the second district commissioner of Willesden district. He took over from captain C. Pearse in November 1915, only 6 months after the association was founded, presumably as Pearse was called away to serve in World War I. Furness continued as district commissioner until his death in 1936.

== Legacy ==
When he died he left an estate valued at £278,312 2s 5d to his wife Mary Mable.

He died during his term as High Sheriff of Middlesex and his son, George James Barnard Furness, was given the position in 1939.
