= Roundwood Park =

Public park in Willesden, London

Coordinates: 51°32′24″N 0°14′15″W

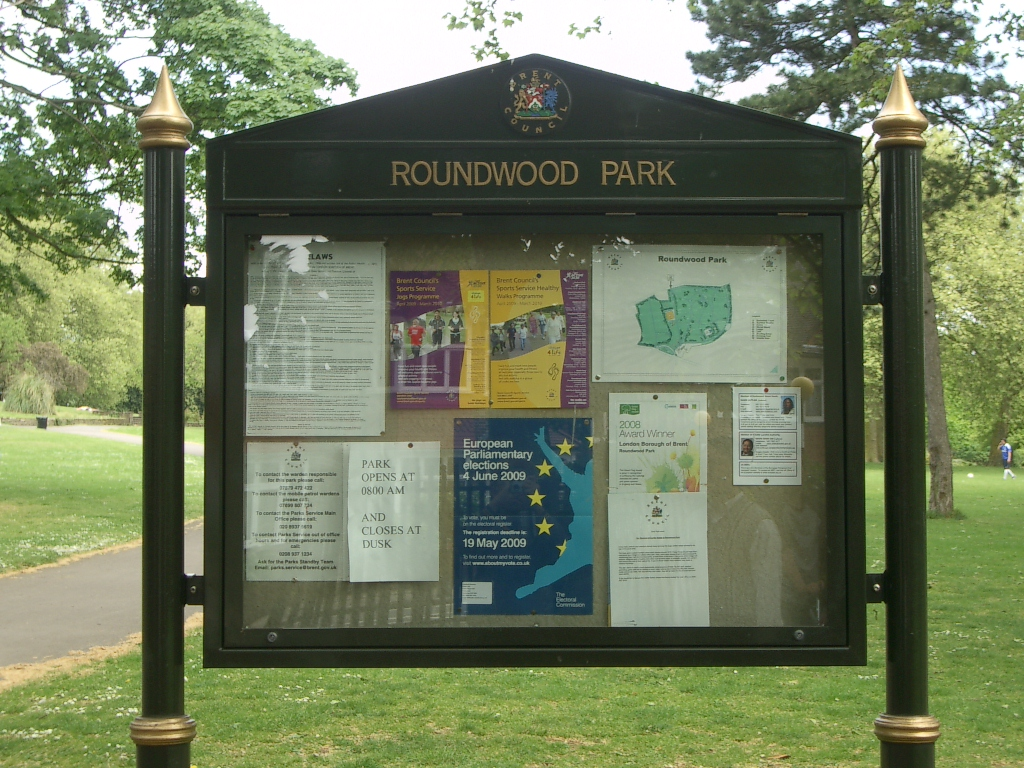
Roundwood Park noticeboard

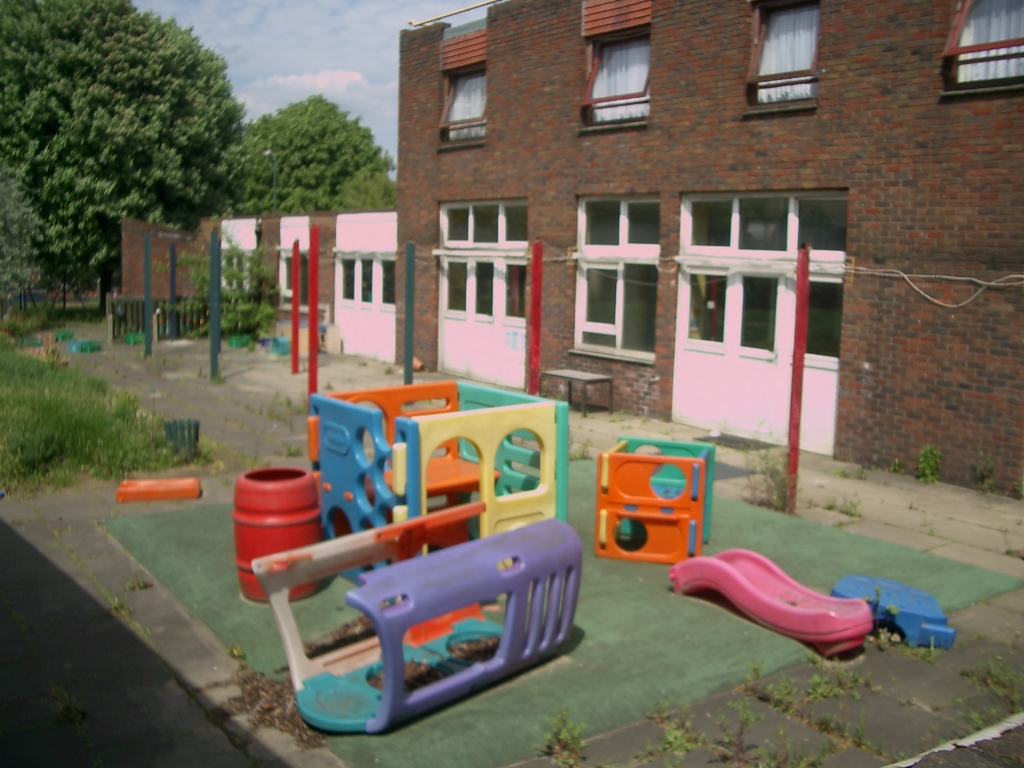
Anansi Nursery, where Knowles Tower used to stand

Roundwood Park is a public park in Willesden, London, measuring a total of 26.5 acres, or approximately 10.27 hectares. It was originally known in the 19th century as Knowles Hill (its name coming from the Knowles Tower nearby), or Hunger Hill Common Field, and after much work by Oliver Claude Robson, became the Roundwood Park known to the public today (its name coming from the Roundwood House originally beside it).

== Origins ==
In 1892, George Furness, at that time the owner of Roundwood House, sold Knowles Hill to the Willesden Local Board for a bargain price of £14,500. At that time, the field only contained a small hillock and a few isolated elm and oak trees.

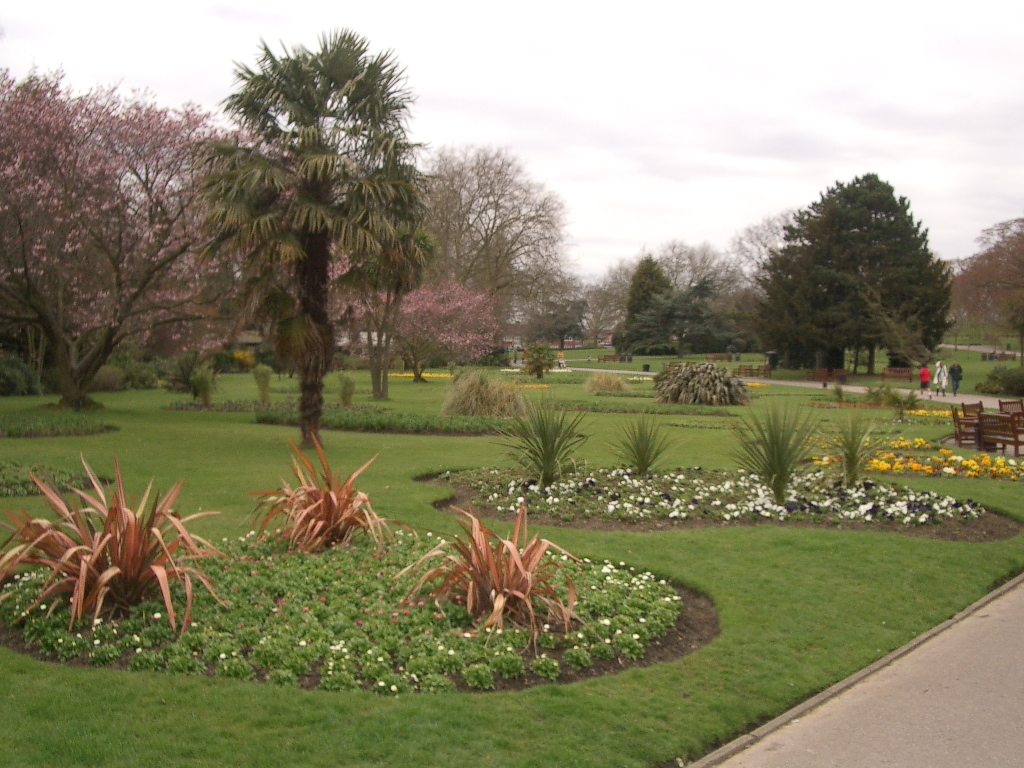
Floral displays at Roundwood Park

== Construction begins ==
After Knowles Hill was sold to the Willesden Local Board, they appointed Oliver Claude Robson to be the main architect. He was the Surveyor for the Local Board, and later to the Willesden Urban District Council, designing the nearby Gladstone Park as well, and serving the councils for a total of 43 years (1875 – 1918).

The Local Board allowed him a sum of £9,000 for setting out the park. He inserted 5 miles of drainage under the park and planted an additional 14,500 trees and shrubs. The work, though, was slow, because Robson chose to use local civilians instead of main contractors.

The main gates were built in 1895 by "Messrs. Tickner and Partington" at the Vulcan Works, located on Harrow Road, Kensal Rise. The wrought iron fence is 270 feet long and a maximum of 18 feet tall at certain places. Originally there was the Willesden Local Board's coat of arms on the gates, but along with general acanthus leaf decorations, it has gradually disappeared over the years.

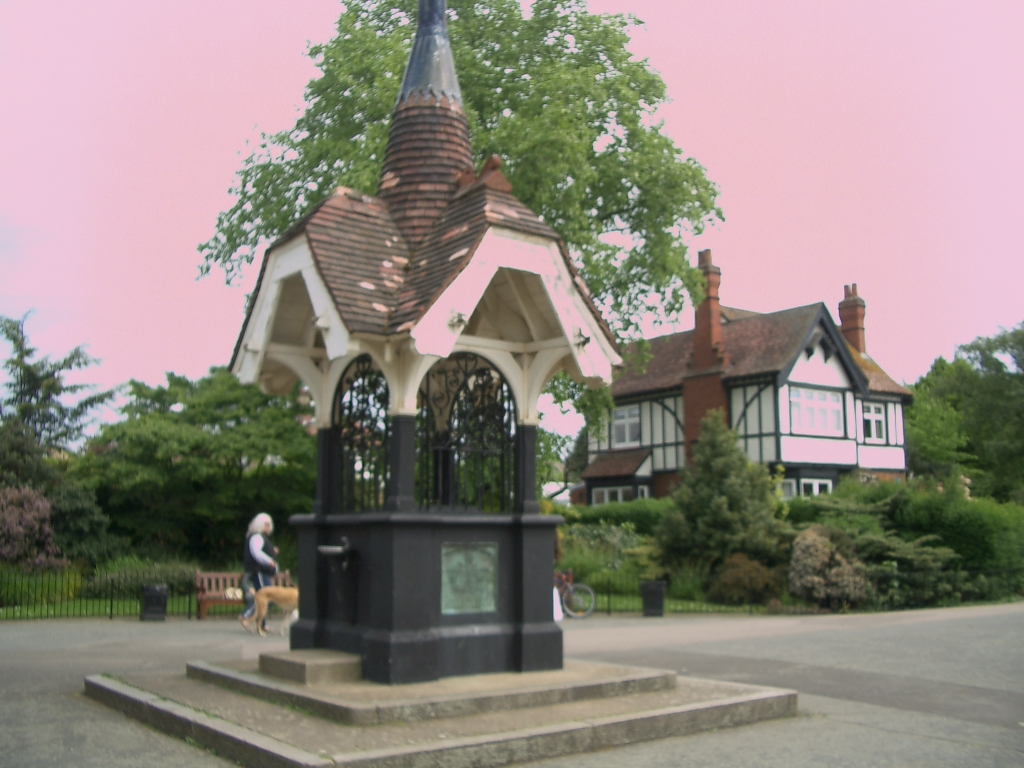
The drinking fountain, with the plaque commemorating the opening of the park. The lodge house is in the background.

Additionally, a number of other things were erected, including: a lodge house to house the gardener; greenhouses supply new flowers; numerous paths, running upward to the focal point – an elegant bandstand on the top of the hill. The red-brick lodge house was constructed in the Victorian-Elizabethan style, with ornamented chimney-breasts. It is currently occupied by council employees.

== Grand opening ==
Roundwood Park was finally opened to the public on 11 May 1895 by R.D.M. Littler, Q.C, Chairman of the Middlesex County Council, who "dedicated it forever to the people". In the opening speech, Mr. Pinkham (Chairman of the Parks Committee) gave much praise to Robson, saying: " ... It was formerly a miniature Dartmoor without the granite, and Mr. Robson had left them a veritable Garden of Eden without the serpents."

A plaque on the drinking fountain near the main gates commemorates the opening of the park and also remembers main architect Oliver Claude Robson for all the work he put in to create Roundwood Park.

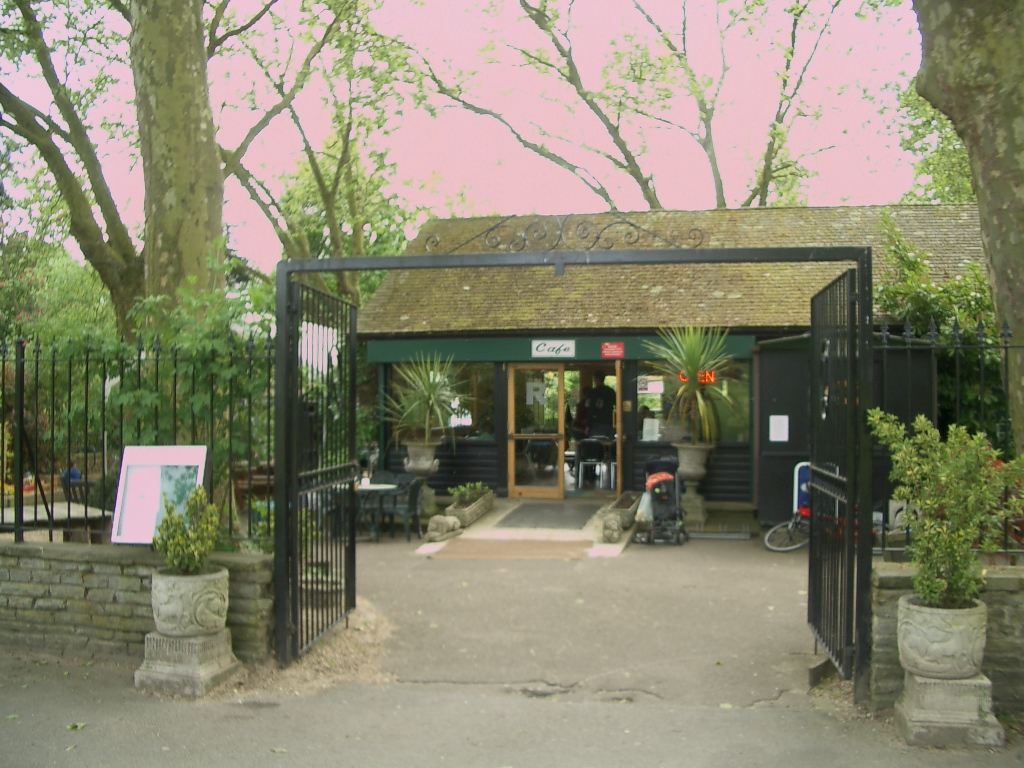
Roundwood Park Lodge Café

== Further construction ==
Robson decided that a café would be a good addition to the park, so in 1897 a suitable building was designed and constructed by council employees. It was made of brick and timber with a steeply pitched slate roof and gables, with a verandah surrounding it. Various owners succeeded one another. In 1985, a new building was constructed because the old one became run down. Known as the Lodge Café, it currently it features a children's playground, sandpit, and an outdoor seating area.

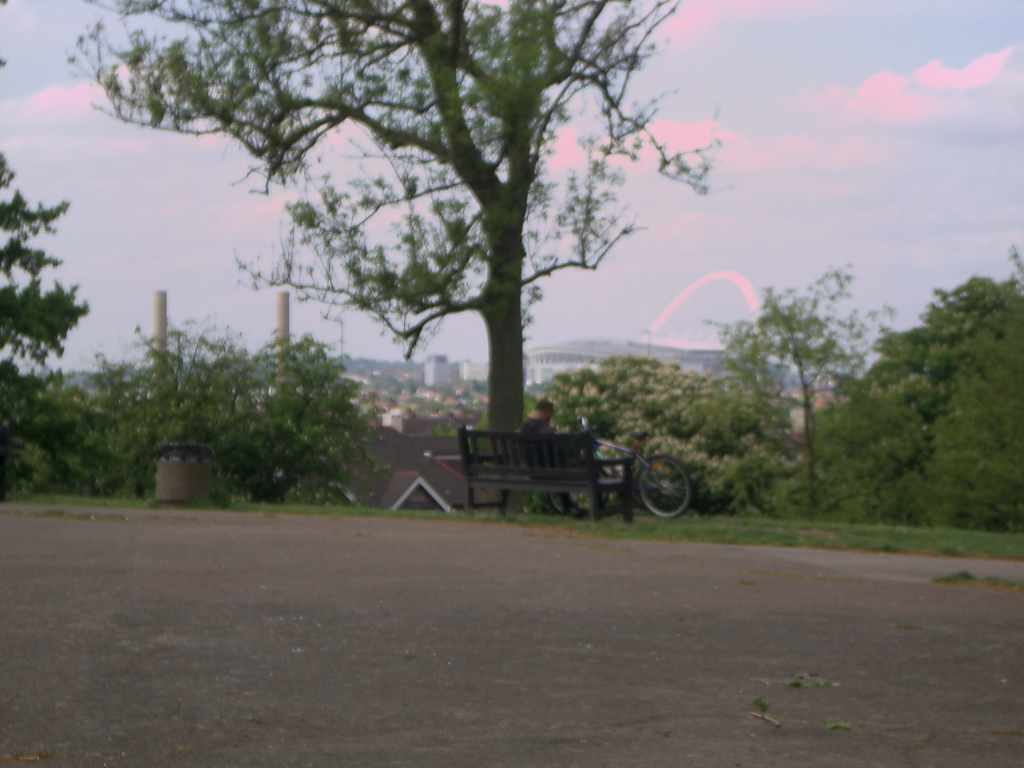
Viewing point on the hill. Wembley Stadium is in the background.

== Features and events ==
Roundwood Park hosts a variety of events, and features some rare and interesting features.

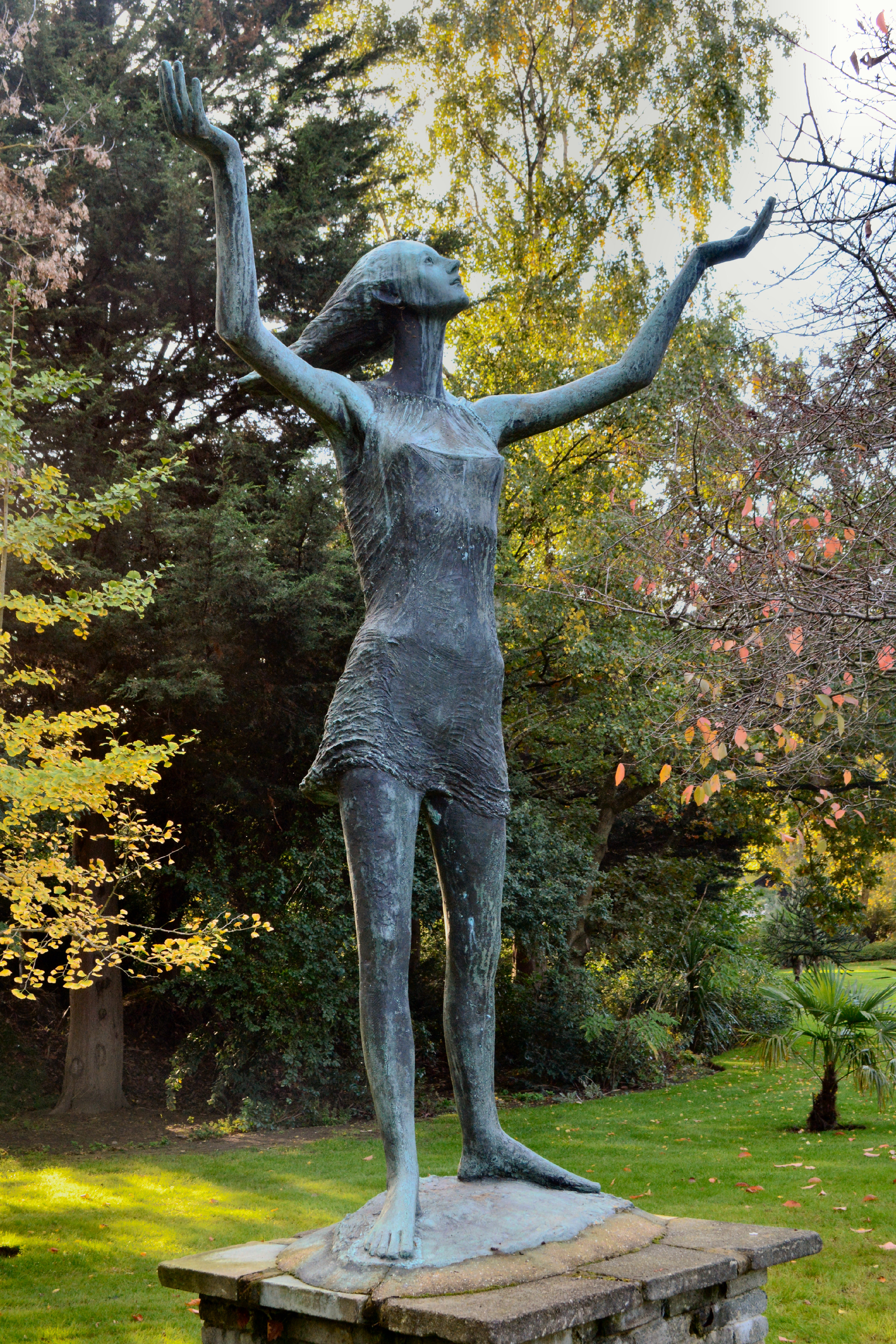
The Spirit of Youth

Next to the entrance is the statue "The Spirit of Youth" by Freda Skinner, which was originally installed outside the new indoor pool at Willesden Lido.

=== Past ===
==== Shows ====
Roundwood Park has been the setting for many public events. In its long history it had seen numerous religious and political open-air meetings, circuses, and much other such events. For many years it was home to the Willesden Show when the place would be crowded with people. Owners of pets of many types, flowers and vegetables, and even 'bonny babies' would compete for prizes in large canvas tents. Art and crafts were shown, and demonstrations of dog handling, sheep shearing, parachuting and trick motor cycling given. Later this became the Brent Show.

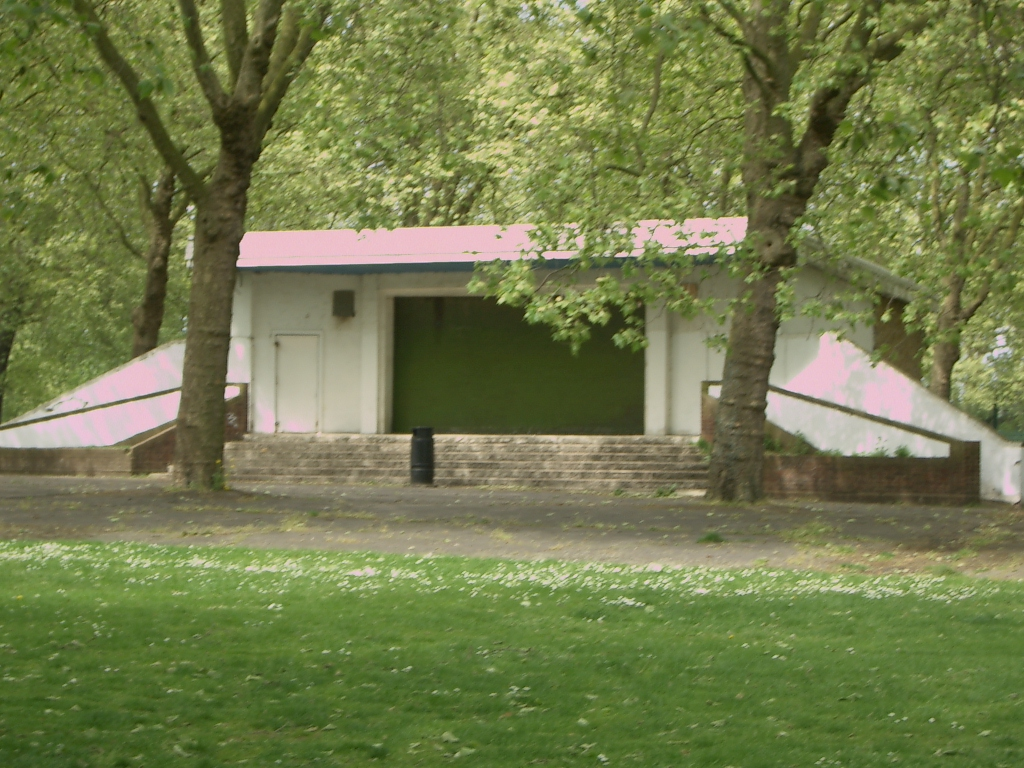
Summer theatre, near the basketball court.

==== Music and theatre ====
For more than 10 years after the Park opened, the Willesden Junction Brass Band gave concerts at the bandstand. This became so popular, that a new rustic-type bandstand was built to the south of the "Gymnasium", where more space for the audience was available. The hilltop became the viewing point. Once Wembley Stadium was erected, it could be seen from the viewing point.

As band concerts lost their popularity, so the park lost its bandstand. In its place a new Summer Theatre was built in 1959. It has seen Shakespeare performances. Currently it is closed and run down, only used occasionally for special events. The Summer Theatre was demolished in 2013.

==== Rides ====
Once a model railway track existed here. It was set up by the Willesden and West London Society of Model Engineers. A temporary track had been laid for the 1953 Willesden Carnival, and in 1954 it opened as a permanent attraction.

Charges for rides were 6d for adults and 3d for children, of which the Council took 50%. By 1957, steam engines were circuiting the raised loop of multiple gauge track during the summer months (subject to weather) on Thursday evenings and weekend afternoons & evenings. Roundwood Park Model Railway Club were running the enterprise in the early 1970s, but gradually the system fell into disuse, and was removed in 1998.

=== Current ===
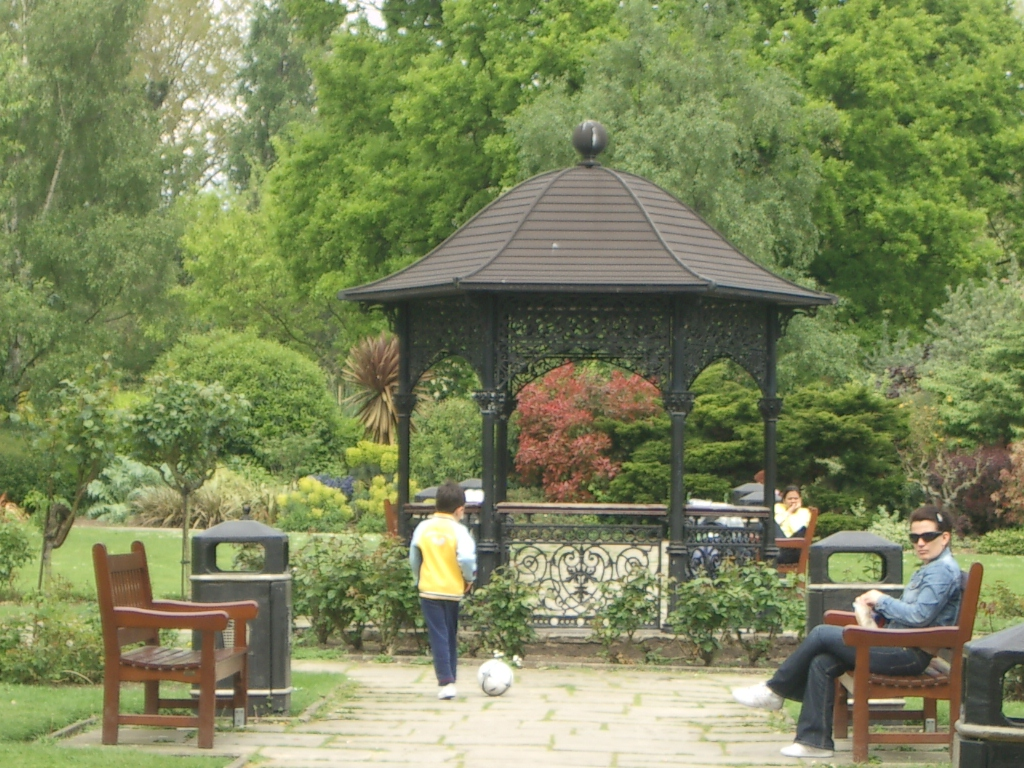
Victorian-style gazebo, near the Aviary.

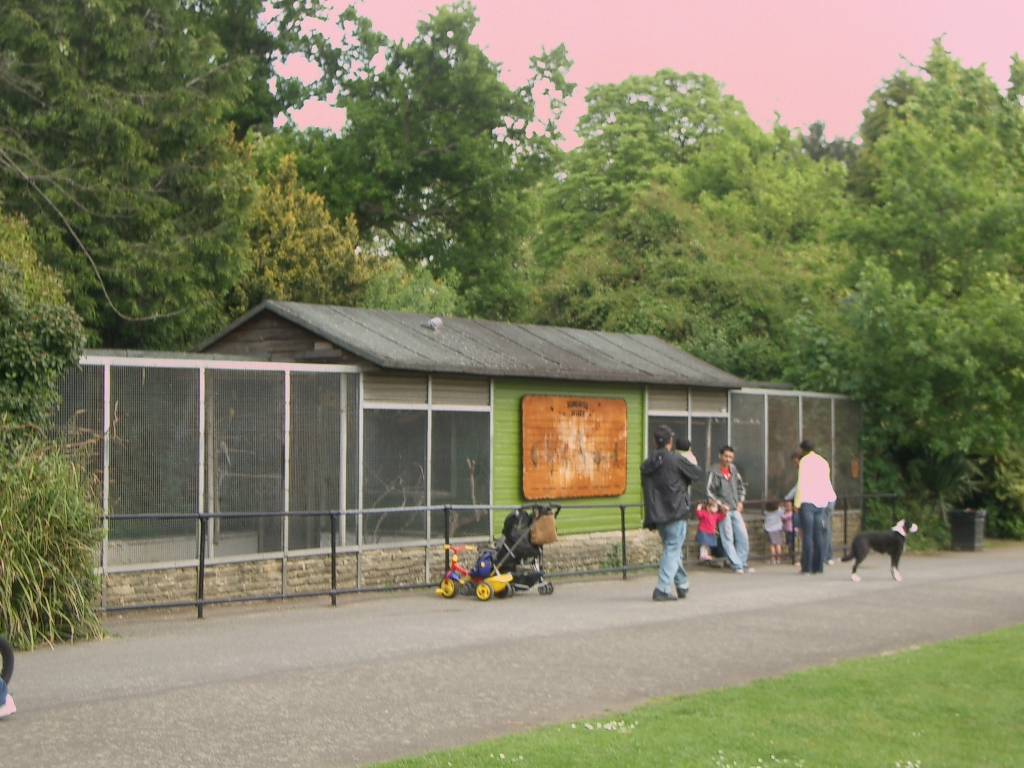
Roundwood Park Aviary

==== Anniversary ====
To mark the 100th anniversary of the park in 1995, the paved rosebush-lined central pathway was equipped with sturdy new seats and a Victorian-style gazebo.

==== Wildlife ====
After an approach by Willesden & District Caged Birds Society in 1955, the Council approved the establishment of an aviary. It was erected the next year. Although successfully fox-proof, it has been a target for thieves. Budgerigars worth £50 were stolen in the summer of 1963, and since then the security of the building was improved. Among the occupants are zebra finches, budgerigars, cockatiels, canaries, and golden pheasants.

The wildlife area is a recent addition to the park. It used to have a pond surrounding the large willow tree. This has been filled in to prevent children from drowning. This particular area is the quietest section of the park, and also sanctuary for birds such as blue tit, common chaffinch, mistle thrush and great spotted woodpecker, as well as many common species.

The fish pond near the Lodge was proposed by the Willesden & District Aquarist Club during 1956, and completed in 1957. It boasts a large willow and tulip trees. In summer, turtles live in the pond.

==== Sport ====
Roundwood Park has always been devoted to floral displays, and a quiet and relaxing environment. Sporting activities are not usually catered for, with the exception of a bowling green built near the centre of the southern path, next to the café. It opened in June 1924 and has been successful ever since. It has occasionally been the target for vandalism, for example in 1958, but is usually in good condition.

On the other side of the hill there is a basketball court. It was originally the children's playground then known as the Gymnasium. Between this and the fence is the storage area for compost, the recycling station. There also used to be a putting green.

Sports facilities in Roundwood Park include:

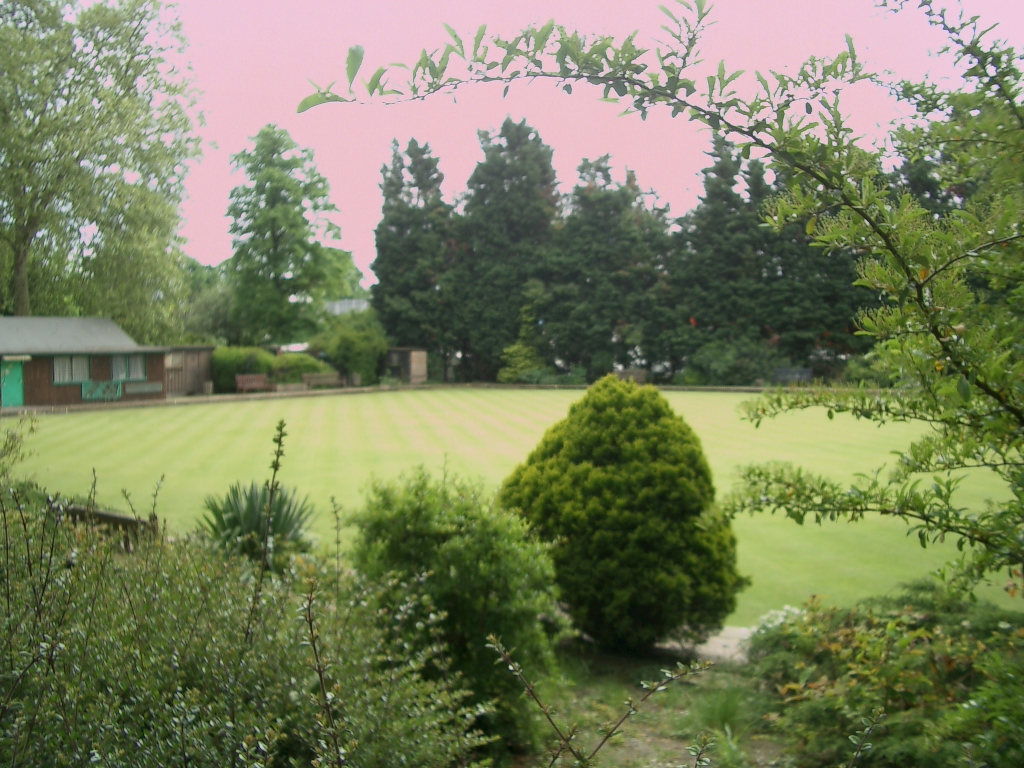
Bowling Green, next to the Lodge Café

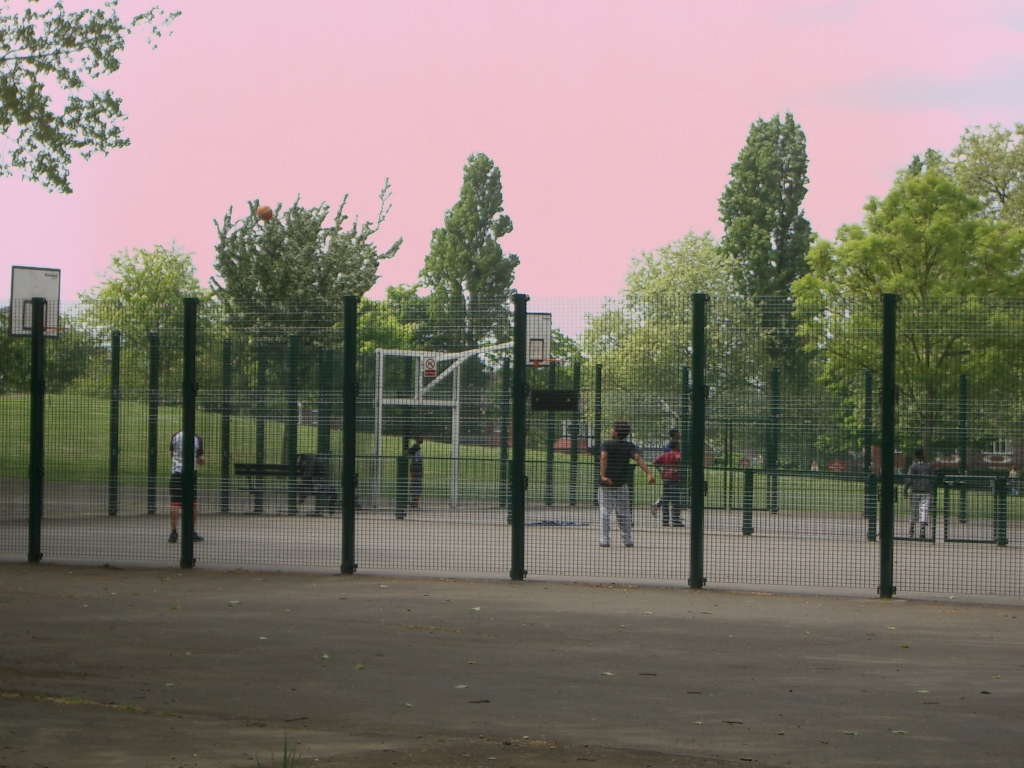
Basketball Court, near the Summer Theatre

==== Events ====
George Irvin's Fun Fair

Current events, including George Irvin's Fun Fair (occurring every May 1 – 10), Zippos Circus, and Eid Prayer in the Park, usually take place in the open space to the south of the park rather than in the main territory.

The annual fireworks display on Guy Fawkes Day is one of the few in London.

The annual Brent Respect Festival is also a major event, celebrating the diversity and talent of the Brent community. It features many shows, workshops and theatrical performances.

== Achievements ==
Roundwood park has achieved the following:

- Green Flag Status
- English Heritage Grade II Listed Status
