= Thomas Barron (trade unionist) =

Scottish trade unionist and political activist

Thomas Barron (8 April 1873 – 22 November 1943) was a Scottish trade unionist and political activist.

Born in Galloway, Scotland, Barron moved to Glasgow when he was fourteen, to undertake an apprenticeship as a joiner. As soon as his apprenticeship was complete, he joined the Associated Carpenters and Joiners of Scotland (AC&JS) union. He was soon elected to the committee of its Glasgow North branch, later serving as treasurer, then chair. He was also elected to the United Trades Committee, which brought together the AC&JS with the Amalgamated Society of Carpenters and Joiners (ASC&J).

In 1905, the headquarters of the union moved to Glasgow, as its constitution required it to do, periodically. Barron was elected to its executive committee and served as the union's chair from 1908. In 1911, it merged into the ASC&J, and Barron became the first treasurer of its Glasgow district and then its secretary until 1917. The union then became part of the new Amalgamated Society of Woodworkers. Barron was elected to the union's National Executive Committee, representing Scotland; he was chair of the union from 1922.

In 1918, Barron was active in the formation of the National Federation of Building Trade Operatives, serving on its first Emergency Committee; he was president of the federation from 1923 until 1936. He was also vice president of the Industrial Council for the Building Trades, where he focused on reforming apprenticeships and strengthening health and safety protections. He also served on the National Housing and Town Planning Council and on the executive of the International Housing Congress. In 1938, he was made an honorary associate of the Royal Institute of British Architects.

Barron was a supporter of the Labour Party, standing unsuccessfully in Nuneaton at the 1923 United Kingdom general election and Montrose Burghs at the 1924 United Kingdom general election. He retired in 1939 and died four years later.

Trade union offices
Preceded by George Hicks	President of the National Federation of Building Trades Operatives; 1923–1936	Succeeded by Luke Fawcett
