= Brent South =

UK Parliament constituency (1974–2010)

Coordinates: 51.5456°N 0.2721°W

- Former borough constituency for the House of Commons
- Boundary of Brent South in Greater London
- County: Greater London

1974–2010
- Seats: One
- Created from: Willesden West
- Replaced by: Brent North, Brent Central, Hampstead and Kilburn

Brent South was a constituency for the House of Commons of the UK Parliament; the areas of the constituency chiefly fell into the new Brent Central for the 2010 general election which was the date of its abolition. It elected one member (MP) by the first past the post system of election.

From its creation in 1974, the constituency consistently elected Labour MPs with large majorities. At the 2010 general election, Brent South was abolished and split between neighbouring Brent North and two newly created constituencies: Brent Central and Hampstead and Kilburn.

== Boundaries ==
1974–1983: The London Borough of Brent wards of Alperton, Barham, Chamberlayne, Harlesden, Kensal Rise, Manor, Roundwood, St Raphael's, Stonebridge, and Wembley Central

1983–1997: As above less Chamberlayne ward, plus Tokyngton ward

1997–2010: As above plus St Andrews ward

== Constituency profile ==
Brent South was a constituency covering various suburban and inner city areas of Brent, namely Kensal Green, Harlesden (including Park Royal and Stonebridge), Neasden (southern part), Wembley (town centre, including Alperton, Tokyngton (from 1983) and southern Sudbury), and (from 1997) southern Kingsbury.

It is one of the most multicultural areas in the United Kingdom. In 1971, 24.6% of the constituency were non-White. In 1981, 43% of the constituency were non-White. The constituency had the highest concentration of those born in the Caribbean (11.5% of the population) in 1981. The 1991 census revealed that 55.4% of the constituency was from an ethnic minority background, the second-highest figure in England at the time behind Birmingham Ladywood.

== Members of Parliament ==
Election	Member	Party
February 1974	Laurie Pavitt	Labour
1987	Paul Boateng	Labour
2005	Dawn Butler	Labour
2010	constituency abolished: see Brent Central, Brent North & Hampstead and Kilburn	

== Election results ==
=== Elections in the 1970s ===
General election February 1974: Brent South
Party	Candidate	Votes	%	±%
Labour Co-op	Laurence Pavitt	22,975	53.0	
Conservative	Richard Holt	12,351	28.5	
Liberal	Heinz Otto Warschauer	5,804	13.4	
National Front	John Harrison-Broadley	1,852	4.3	
Communist	Leslie George Burt	380	0.9	
Majority		10,624	24.5	
Turnout		43,362	71.4	
Labour Co-op win (new seat)				

General election October 1974: Brent South
Party	Candidate	Votes	%	±%
Labour Co-op	Laurence Pavitt	21,611	57.7	+4.7
Conservative	Mark Lennox-Boyd	10,558	28.2	−0.3
Liberal	John Quentin Gerald Hugh Rappoport	3,929	10.5	−2.9
National Front	John Harrison-Broadley	1,388	3.7	−0.6
Majority		11,053	29.5	+5.0
Turnout		37,486	61.2	−10.2
Labour Co-op hold		Swing	+2.5	

General election 1979: Brent South
Party	Candidate	Votes	%	±%
Labour Co-op	Laurence Pavitt	24,178	59.4	+1.7
Conservative	David Heathcoat-Amory	12,572	30.9	+2.7
Liberal	Paul Russell Hannon	2,859	7.0	−3.5
National Front	Avril Georgina Frances Downes	811	2.0	−1.7
Workers Revolutionary	Raymond Thomas O'Neill	277	0.7	New
Majority		11,606	28.5	−1.0
Turnout		40,697	68.3	+7.1
Labour Co-op hold		Swing	−1.7	

=== Elections in the 1980s ===
General election 1983: Brent South
Party	Candidate	Votes	%	±%
Labour Co-op	Laurence Pavitt	21,259	53.3	−6.1
Conservative	Charles Smedley	10,740	26.9	−4.0
Liberal	Roger Billins	7,557	18.9	+11.9
Independent	Roy Sawh	356	0.9	New
Majority		10,519	26.4	−2.1
Turnout		39,912	63.6	−4.7
Labour Co-op hold		Swing	−1.0	

General election 1987: Brent South
Party	Candidate	Votes	%	±%
Labour	Paul Boateng	21,140	51.9	−1.4
Conservative	Anthony Paterson	13,209	30.5	+3.6
Liberal	Michael Harskin	6,375	15.7	−3.2
Majority		7,931	19.4	−7.0
Turnout		38,007	64.9	+1.3
Labour hold		Swing	−1.1	

=== Elections in the 1990s ===
General election 1992: Brent South
Party	Candidate	Votes	%	±%
Labour	Paul Boateng	20,662	57.5	+5.6
Conservative	Bob Blackman	10,957	30.5	0.0
Liberal Democrats	Michael Harskin	3,658	10.2	−5.5
Green	Darren Johnson	479	1.3	New
Natural Law	Chandrakant Jani	166	0.5	New
Majority		9,705	27.0	+7.6
Turnout		35,992	64.1	−0.8
Labour hold		Swing		

General election 1997: Brent South
Party	Candidate	Votes	%	±%
Labour	Paul Boateng	25,180	73.0	+15.5
Conservative	Stewart Jackson	5,489	15.9	−14.6
Liberal Democrats	Julian Brazil	2,670	7.7	−2.5
Referendum	Janet Phythian	497	1.4	New
Green	David Edler	389	1.1	−0.2
Rainbow Dream Ticket	Christopher Howard	175	0.5	New
Natural Law	Anjali Kaul Mahaldar	98	0.3	−0.2
Majority		19,691	57.1	+30.1
Turnout		34,498	64.5	+0.4
Labour hold		Swing	+15.1	

=== Elections in the 2000s ===
General election 2001: Brent South
Party	Candidate	Votes	%	±%
Labour	Paul Boateng	20,984	73.3	+0.3
Conservative	Carupiah Selvarajah	3,604	12.6	−3.3
Liberal Democrats	Havard Hughes	3,098	10.8	+3.1
Socialist Alliance	Michael McDonnell	491	1.7	New
Residents and Motorists of Great Britain	Tomas Stiofain	460	1.6	New
Majority		17,380	60.7	+3.6
Turnout		28,637	51.2	−13.3
Labour hold		Swing	+1.8	

General election 2005: Brent South
Party	Candidate	Votes	%	±%
Labour	Dawn Butler	17,501	58.8	−14.5
Liberal Democrats	James Allie	6,175	20.7	+9.9
Conservative	Rishi Saha	4,485	15.1	+2.5
Green	Rowan Langley	957	3.2	New
Independent	Shaun Wallace	297	1.0	New
Independent	Rocky Fernandez	288	1.0	New
Rainbow Dream Ticket	Rainbow George Weiss	61	0.2	New
Majority		11,326	38.1	−22.6
Turnout		29,764	52.7	+1.5
Labour hold		Swing		
