= Mavis Tate =

British politician (1893–1947)

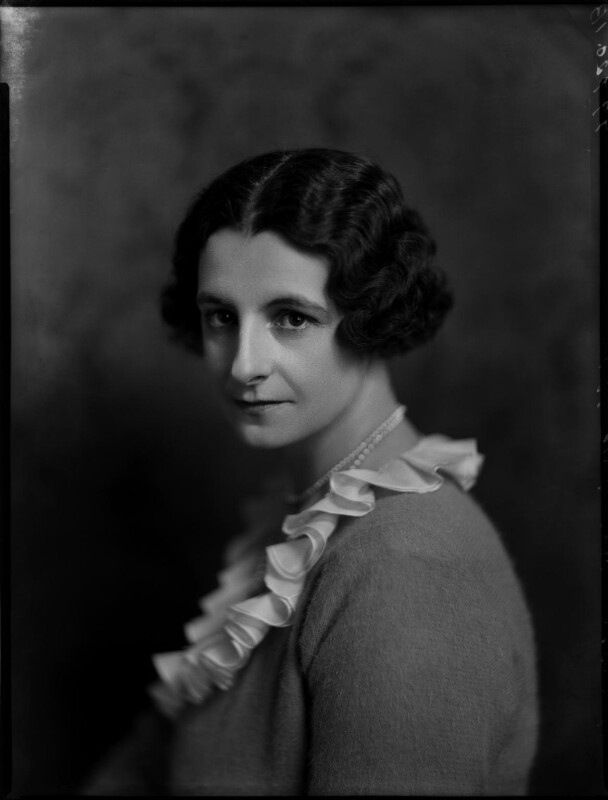
- Tate in 1935

Member of Parliament for Frome
- In office 14 November 1935 – 15 June 1945
- Prime Minister: Stanley Baldwin
- Preceded by: Henry Thynne, Viscount Weymouth
- Succeeded by: Walter Farthing

Member of Parliament for Willesden West
- In office 27 October 1931 – 25 October 1935
- Preceded by: Samuel Viant
- Succeeded by: Samuel Viant

Personal details
- Born: Maybird Hogg; 17 August 1893
- Died: 5 June 1947 (aged 53) London, England
- Party: Conservative

Mavis Constance Tate (born Maybird Hogg; 17 August 1893 – 5 June 1947) was a British Conservative politician and campaigner for British women's rights.

== Early life ==
Maybird Hogg was daughter of Guy Weir Hogg (1861–1943), a diplomat who served as British consul for Portugal, Sweden, and Norway, was a justice of the peace, and had business interests as managing director of SA Advertising Contractors at Cape Town, South Africa, and as general manager of the Uganda Company. His wife Constance was daughter of Henry Joseph Marsden. Guy Hogg was grandson of Sir James Hogg, 1st Baronet, politician and chairman of the East India Company. Mavis Tate's brother, Kenneth, would succeed as the 6th baronet.

== Political career ==
As a member of the Conservative Party, she was elected Member of Parliament (MP) for what under normal political conditions was generally a safe Labour seat, Willesden West, in 1931. In 1935, she moved to the constituency of Frome, which she held for the Conservatives with a majority of 994. Frome had been a Labour seat during the 1920s prior to her election, and in 1945 she was defeated by the Labour candidate.

Tate was an early member of Archibald Ramsay's Right Club from its founding in May 1939. At the same time, however, she was on record for having publicly protested Germany's mistreatment of Jews after Kristallnacht in 1938. Tate further distanced herself from the far-right after a nervous breakdown in 1940.

== Women's rights campaign ==
In 1932, as MP for Willesden West, she spoke out against a clause in the National Health Insurance and Contributory Pension Bill which would penalise all married women as 'malingerers and cheats until they have definitely proved that they are not', though they had paid fully into the fund. On the Employment Bill of 1933 she argued lucidly for more training of the unemployed: 'it would be better to send a smaller number of people to undertake a really full course of training, and to turn them out as trained men, capable of earning good wages, than to send a larger number there and again flood the market with people who are not fully trained.' This was an issue she returned to again and again in her parliamentary career. In 1934 during discussion of the Employment Assistance Act, she raised the issue of different benefit scales for men and women: 'When you are dealing with the destitute, I suggest that a destitute man and a destitute woman cannot be kept for a different sum of money.' She argued for improvements in midwifery training, given 'terrible figures of maternal mortality' in 1935. She raised the issue of money research into mental disorder and deficiency, particularly when sterilisation as a solution to mental incapacity was being advocated, also observing what were then solutions: 'Do you mean to tell me that the padded cell is a method of cure?'

She was a passionate advocate of equal pay for men and women:

The question really is one of principle. I believe that work should be done by the man or woman best qualified to do it, and that the pay should be commensurate with what the work is worth. But it is just as well to recognise, when we consider the question of women's work, that no one has ever objected to women working. They have always worked extremely hard. They not only ran their homes, but if we go back to the Middle Ages we find that they also spun their cloth, worked hard on the land, brought up their children, and in fact produced or helped to produce most of the consumable products in the country. It is only when women begin to work for gain that the question of her work ever arises. That is a thing which it is just as well to remember when we are talking of women taking men's work. If we look back we find it was when men began to bake bread and sell it for profit, when men began to manage the heavy laundry machinery, when men began to produce by industry the consumable products, that it was first recognised that women had no right to work for gain. Therefore, do not let us talk only of women taking men's work, because obviously not so long ago it was the men who took the women's work.

With regard to the Government's attitude, we can safely say that they have given perhaps the worst possible example, as regards equal pay. We know that with regard to the Civil service, the teaching profession and everywhere where they have employed women, they have systematically employed them at a lower rate of pay than men. In spite of resolutions that have been passed by this House the position is steadily getting worse, with the result that you will inevitably have an increase in the number of women employed and a decrease in the number of men.

She supported the equal rights of women within a discussion of the nationality of women: 'in so far as nationality is concerned a married woman should be in the same position as a man, married or unmarried, or any single woman', presenting a petition to that effect from 100 Commonwealth women's groups.

By 1936 she was the MP for Frome. She supported the Marriage Bill in that year, because it attempted to remove abuses of divorce law. She spoke of the effects of illegitimacy upon children whose parents were unable to marry because 'they are legally tied to partners who are in prison or in an asylum'. She challenged the employment of 14 year olds in factories, expressing concern for the deterioration of health in young people once they had left school, especially many firms took little regard of the regulations for limiting long hours and overtime; she argued again for equal pay for men and women. She argued for improvements in pensions for women: 'A woman who has had all her life to earn her own living has usually had to do so at a lower salary than a man in the same position would have earned. She has therefore not been able to save as much money as he probably could have saved.' She objected to clauses in the Marriage Bill which seemed to imply that a desertion by one partner over several years did not constitute a breakdown of a marriage; she quoted a clergyman: "If the bonds are broken, if the happy relationship of love and confidence is destroyed and cannot be re-established, if the home becomes a hell, if one partner repudiates his responsibility and leaves the other to face life alone, the re[ality] is no Christian marriage."

In the World War II, Tate was an advocate of arming women to resist a feared German invasion in 1940. Tate read and quoted the work of the overtly antisemitic writer Douglas Reed, who she used to support her advocacy for the mass internment of refugees in 1940. Tate stated that Jews were capable of acting as spies for Nazism: "I sympathise with the Jews, but Germany has learned to make skilful use of them...It is no good saying that because a person is a refugee, because a man is a Jew and a victim of Nazi aggression, that he may not, nevertheless, be a potential danger to this country".

She chaired the Women's Power Committee of 1941 and the Equal Pay Campaign Committee of 1942 and was vocal on the subject of equal pay for women as part of the war effort.

== Contrary views ==
In two areas she seems to have gone against the considered advice of both colleagues and scientists.

In 1936 she raised the issue of the validity of the kind of smallpox vaccination the government was issuing, challenging the use of a living virus. In 1939 she said that the lymph vaccination method to be used for the inoculation of soldiers was 'produced partly from rabbits, and is very likely, therefore, to spread encephalitis, and is exceedingly dangerous to use'. Her statement was ignored.

In 1937 she objected to the pasteurisation of milk, citing mothers in her constituency who did not care for it, claiming later 'the nutritive value of the milk negligible and the taste nauseating'. In 1939 she pursued this theme, saying that 'pasteurisation kills not only the vitamins but the hormones in milk', a 'pernicious practice'. A Royal Commission she alone requested on this issue was not approved. In spite of what seems to be general approval of pasteurisation by fellow MPs, she continued to pursue the issue: 'many people loathe pasteurised milk', despite cases of pulmonary tuberculosis 40% of which were related to milk infection (from unpasteurised sources).

== Journalism ==
In April 1945, shortly before the end of World War II, Tate travelled with nine other British parliamentarians to visit the Buchenwald concentration camp in Germany to report on the result of the atrocities there. She narrated the newsreel of this visit for British Pathé News, saying "do believe me when I tell you that the reality was indescribably worse than these pictures.". On 25 April Earl Stanhope, a Conservative peer, submitted the group's report to Prime Minister Winston Churchill, who then presented it to Parliament on 27 April 1945.

== Personal life ==
She married Captain Gerald Ewart Gott in 1915; they divorced in 1925. In 1925 she married Henry Burton Tate, from whom she was divorced in 1944. She had adopted the first name of "Mavis" in 1930 by deed poll. She suffered a nervous breakdown in 1940.

== Death ==
Tate committed suicide by gassing herself. Tate died at 6 Bloomfield Terrace, Westminster, on 5 June 1947, leaving an estate valued for probate at £35,482,978. At an inquest on her death in 1947 the Coroner for Westminster found that she had committed suicide while her mind was disturbed through ill-health. In a note left for her brother she wrote: "As I have no one dependent on me, it seems to be the wiser thing to end my life. An invalid is only a national liability. Today I cannot endure the extensive, constant pain in my head and I have had practically no sleep at all for week after week." The medical evidence indicated the effects of intense overwork., including intense pain from kidney trouble. Her brother, Col. Kenneth Hogg, said she was always trying to do too much. Her illness dated from the time she visited the Buchenwald concentration camp in 1945.

Parliament of the United Kingdom
Preceded by Samuel Viant	Member of Parliament for Willesden West; 1931–1935	Succeeded by Samuel Viant
Preceded by Henry Thynne, Viscount Weymouth	Member of Parliament for Frome; 1935–1945	Succeeded by Walter Farthing
