= Jack McDermott =

John Frederick McDermott (3 September 1906 – 14 August 1958) was an Irish trade unionist.

Born in Dublin, McDermott joined the Amalgamated Society of Woodworkers at the age of fourteen. He rapidly rose through the ranks, becoming branch secretary, then district secretary, a member of the general council and then of the executive council, and the Irish registration officer for the union. He also represented the union at the Irish Trades Union Congress, and sat on the standing orders committee of the Irish Labour Party.

McDermott was elected as assistant general secretary of the Woodworkers in 1947, then, the following year, succeeded as general secretary. In 1949, he was elected onto the General Council of the Trades Union Congress, and he also sat on the council of the National Federation of Building Trades Operatives.

Trade union offices
Preceded by Thomas O. Williams	Assistant General Secretary of the Amalgamated Society of Woodworkers; 1947–1948	Succeeded by George Smith
Preceded by Frank Wolstencroft	General Secretary of the Amalgamated Society of Woodworkers; 1948–1958	Succeeded by George Smith
