= George Smith (trade unionist) =

Scottish trade unionist

Sir George Fenwick Smith CBE (24 June 1914 – 21 November 1978) was a Scottish trade unionist.

Smith was born in Arbroath, Angus, and educated at Inverbrothock and Downfield Schools. He worked as a carpenter and joined the Amalgamated Society of Woodworkers in 1933. He also joined the Communist Party of Great Britain in the early 1940s but left it in 1954.

Smith became the full-time National Organiser of the Woodworkers in 1945, and then Assistant General Secretary in 1949. Ten years later, he was elected as the union's General Secretary. When the Woodworkers merged with other unions to form the Union of Construction, Allied Trades and Technicians, Smith became its first General Secretary, serving until his death in 1978. He also serve as the President of the Trades Union Congress in 1972, and on the council of Acas from 1974.

He was appointed a Commander of the Order of the British Empire in 1969 and knighted in the 1978 New Year Honours.

He died in Sutton, London, in 1978.

Trade union offices
Preceded by Jack McDermott	Assistant General Secretary of the Amalgamated Society of Woodworkers; 1949–1959	Succeeded by W. J. Martin
Preceded by Jack McDermott	General Secretary of the Amalgamated Society of Woodworkers; 1959–1971	Succeeded by Position abolished
Preceded by Jack Cooper and Harry Nicholas	Trades Union Congress representative to the AFL–CIO; 1969; With: Sidney Greene	Succeeded by Cyril Plant and Hugh Scanlon
Preceded by New position	General Secretary of UCATT; 1971–1978	Succeeded by Les Wood
Preceded by Jack Cooper	President of the Trades Union Congress; 1972	Succeeded by Joseph Crawford
