= Paul Boateng =

British Labour Party politician (born 1951)

The Right Honourable The Lord Boateng CVO PC DL
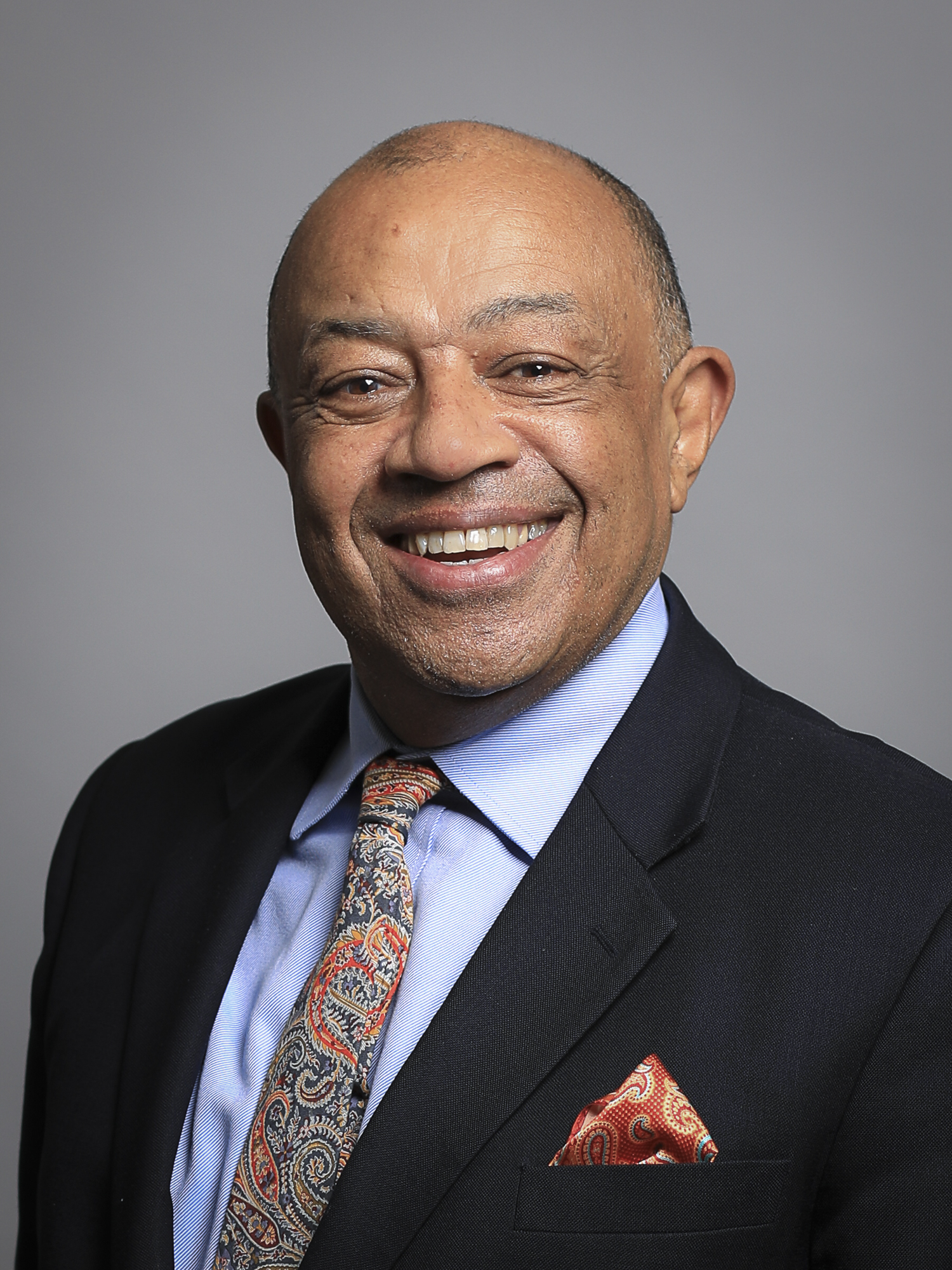
- Official portrait, 2020

British High Commissioner to South Africa
- In office 14 March 2005 – 26 April 2009
- Monarch: Elizabeth II
- President: Thabo Mbeki; Kgalema Motlanthe
- Preceded by: Ann Grant
- Succeeded by: Nicola Brewer

Chief Secretary to the Treasury
- In office 29 May 2002 – 5 May 2005
- Prime Minister: Tony Blair
- Chancellor: Gordon Brown
- Preceded by: Andrew Smith
- Succeeded by: Des Browne

Financial Secretary to the Treasury
- In office 8 June 2001 – 28 May 2002
- Prime Minister: Tony Blair
- Preceded by: Stephen Timms
- Succeeded by: Ruth Kelly

Minister of State for Home Affairs and Deputy Home Secretary
- In office 27 October 1998 – 8 June 2001
- Prime Minister: Tony Blair
- Preceded by: Alun Michael
- Succeeded by: John Denham

Parliamentary Under-Secretary of State for Disabled People
- In office 4 May 1997 – 27 October 1998
- Prime Minister: Tony Blair
- Preceded by: Alistair Burt
- Succeeded by: Margaret Hodge

Member of the House of Lords
- Lord Temporal
- Life peerage 27 June 2010

Member of Parliament for Brent South
- In office 11 June 1987 – 11 April 2005
- Preceded by: Laurie Pavitt
- Succeeded by: Dawn Butler

Personal details
- Born: 14 June 1951 (age 75) Hackney Central, London, England
- Party: Labour
- Spouse(s): Janet, Lady Boateng
- Children: 5
- Education: University of Bristol

Paul Yaw Boateng, Baron Boateng, CVO, PC, DL (born 14 June 1951) is a British Labour Party politician and a former civil rights lawyer. He was the Member of Parliament (MP) for Brent South from 1987 to 2005, and became the UK's first Black Cabinet Minister in May 2002, when he was appointed as Chief Secretary to the Treasury. Following his departure from the House of Commons, he served as the British High Commissioner to South Africa from March 2005 to May 2009. He was introduced as a member of the House of Lords on 1 July 2010.

== Background and early life ==
Boateng was born in Hackney, London, of mixed Ghanaian and Scottish heritage; his family later moved to Ghana when Boateng was four years old. His father, Kwaku Boateng, was a lawyer and Cabinet Minister during Kwame Nkrumah's government. Boateng had his early education at Ghana International School and attended Accra Academy, a high school in Ghana. Boateng's life in Ghana came to an abrupt end after his father went to jail in 1966 following a military coup, which toppled the Ghanaian government. His father was imprisoned without trial for four years. Boateng, then aged 15, and his sister, Rosemary, fled to the UK with their mother.

They settled in Hemel Hempstead, where he attended Apsley Grammar School. He later read law at the University of Bristol, where he resided at Wills Hall and was a member of the Barneys Club. He began his career in civil rights, originally as a solicitor, though he later retrained as a barrister. He worked primarily on social and community cases, starting under renowned civil rights advocate Benedict Birnberg, involving women's rights, housing and police complaints, including a period from 1977 to 1981 as the legal advisor for the Scrap Sus Campaign. Boateng was also an executive member of the National Council for Civil Liberties. He represented Cherry Groce, a mother of six who was shot and paralysed by a police officer during a raid on her home, in search of her son. He became a partner at the firm B. M. Birnberg & Co., and as a barrister, he practised at Eight King's Bench Walk.

== Political career ==
In 1981, Boateng was elected to represent Walthamstow on the Greater London Council, of which Ken Livingstone became leader shortly after the election. As chair of the GLC's police committee and vice-chair of its ethnic minorities committee, Boateng advocated greater accountability in the Metropolitan Police and spoke out against racism in relation to their dealings with the African Caribbean and Asian communities.

=== Member of Parliament ===
He unsuccessfully stood as a parliamentary candidate for Hertfordshire West (which included his former home town of Hemel Hempstead) at the 1983 general election. He was elected at the general election of 1987, when he became the MP for Brent South in succession to Laurence Pavitt, being one of the first non-white British MPs elected since the 1920s and the first black MP since Peter McLagan in the 19th century, elected alongside fellow Labour Party Black Sections members Bernie Grant, Diane Abbott and Keith Vaz. During his victory speech, Boateng said: "We can never be free in Brent until South Africa is free too." He then declared: "Today Brent South, tomorrow Soweto!"

Like many other members of Labour's left-wing in the 1980s, he became more moderate under the leadership of Neil Kinnock. For instance, Boateng refused to join the Parliamentary Black Caucus founded by Diane Abbott, Bernie Grant, Keith Vaz and David Pitt, Baron Pitt of Hampstead in 1988, which eventually collapsed. Kinnock rewarded Boateng by making him a junior Treasury spokesman in 1989, and then the first Black person to join the front bench as a party spokesperson. Boateng's portfolio included economics, industrial strategies and corporate responsibility. In 1992, he became shadow minister for the Lord Chancellor's Department, a post he held until the 1997 general election, where he was a strong advocate for increasing pro bono legal services among UK law firms.

=== Ministerial career ===
With Labour's landslide victory in 1997, Boateng became the UK's first black government minister as Parliamentary Under-Secretary for Health, where he was responsible for social services, mental health and disabled people. In that position, he published guidelines to end the denial of adoptions purely on the basis of race.

In 1998, Boateng became a Minister of State at the Home Office and subsequently became Number 2 Minister there. He was made a Privy Counsellor in 1999. He earned a reputation for being tough on crime, particularly with regard to aggressive begging on the streets. He also worked with Eric Holder, then United States Deputy Attorney-General, and Louis Freeh, then Director of the FBI, on issues related to international drug trafficking and interdiction.

Boateng's portfolio was expanded in 2000, and he became the first Minister for Young People, where his priority was to listen to and be a voice for Britain's youth. He launched the Youth, Citizenship and Social Change programme, then the UK's largest research project designed to examine social exclusion and promoting citizenship among young people. He also played a leading role in establishing and launching the £450,000,000 Children's Fund designed to tackle child poverty. Boateng's ministerial colleagues encouraged him to stand as the Labour candidate to be the Mayor of London; however, he ruled himself out and strongly criticised his former GLC colleague Ken Livingstone. Boateng supported the candidacy of Frank Dobson, with whom he had served in the Department of Health.

=== Cabinet history ===
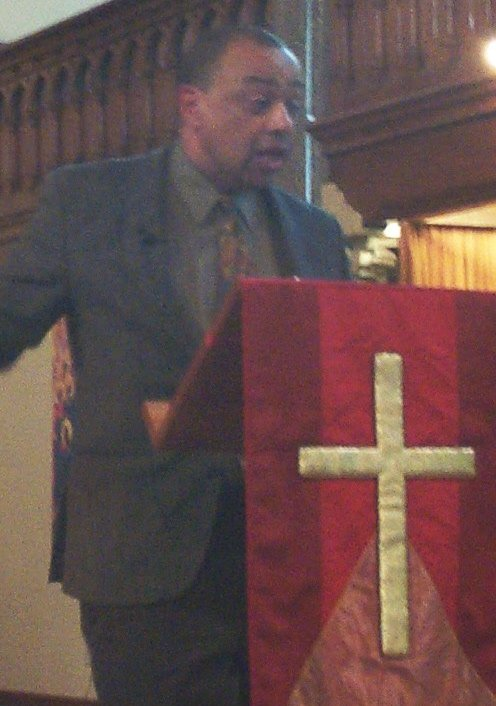
Boateng in 2005

In 2001, Boateng was made Financial Secretary to the Treasury, and was promoted to the position of Chief Secretary to the Treasury in May 2002, becoming Britain's first black cabinet minister. He was quoted as saying: "My colour is part of me but I do not choose to be defined by my colour." His appointment was greeted with praise by civil rights activists who said that his appointment gave hope to young black youths, and would inspire them to become involved in politics. To commemorate this historic achievement, Parliament commissioned a painting of Boateng by Jonathan Yeo, which is displayed in the collection of 21st Century Parliamentarians.

In his role as Chief Secretary to the Treasury, Boateng was responsible for finalising the Spending Review of 2002 and leading the Spending Review of 2004. Coordinating with Sir Peter Gershon's report, Boateng announced in 2004 the government's efficiency programme to save more than £20,000,000,000 in the public sector.

Boateng played a leading role in coordinating the Every Child Matters policy paper, which called for the reform of children's services, including greater accountability and coordination among government agencies. He was also a passionate advocate for increasing development aid to Africa and the developing nations. Foreshadowing his future role, he made numerous trips to Africa, meeting with business and government leaders in an effort to highlight the fact that international aid and the Millennium Development Goals were key priorities for the government. Boateng also assisted Gordon Brown in drafting the Africa Commission report, which called for increasing aid to Africa from Western nations to $50 billion a year.

In March 2005, Boateng announced that he would not stand for re-election as an MP at the general election. Dawn Butler was selected by the Constituency Labour Party to replace him and was elected in Brent South.

=== High Commissioner to South Africa ===
Due to Boateng's passion and enthusiasm for the government's Africa Commission Report and his associations with African leaders, Tony Blair named him to be the next High Commissioner to South Africa for a term of four years, making him the first black ambassador in British history. Many Africans praised the appointment, stating that it was an important symbolic break from Britain's colonial past and saw it as a symbol of Tony Blair's commitment to the continent. Boateng is credited with building a close relationship with the African National Congress government in South Africa, and it was reported that he privately worked to bring together bitter rivals in the crisis in Zimbabwe, although he publicly condemned the Zimbabwean government's illegal occupation of land from white farmers and the resulting turmoil, which Boateng labelled a "human rights crisis." He has also addressed the World Economic Forum on issues concerning Africa. In 2008, he participated in a number of talks with political leaders in the United States to encourage them to support the Doha Development Round trade negotiations that would open Western markets to goods from Africa and other developing countries.

=== Appointment to the House of Lords ===
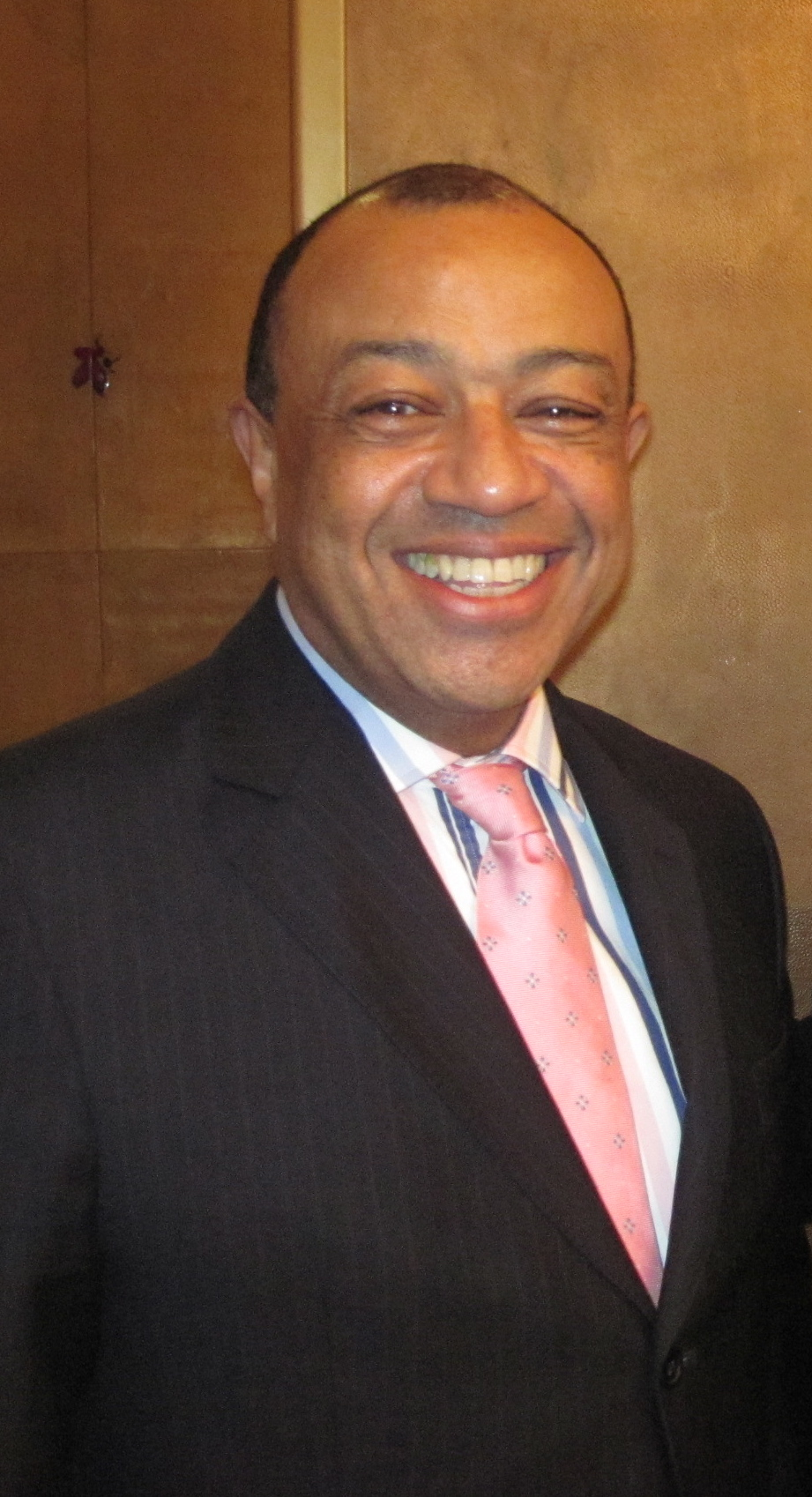
Boateng in 2010

On 28 May 2010, it was announced in the 2010 Dissolution Honours that Boateng would become a member of the House of Lords. On 27 June 2010 he was created Baron Boateng, of Akyem in the Republic of Ghana and of Wembley in the London Borough of Brent and was introduced to the Lords on 1 July 2010; he was supported by Lord Ouseley and Lord Janner. Boateng's maiden speech to the House of Lords highlighted the needs of poor and disadvantaged children, both in rural and urban areas. He called on the Government to examine the impact that the Budget and forthcoming Spending Review would have on children at risk. In December 2011, he initiated a debate in the House of Lords to discuss cuts in funding to the Citizens Advice Bureau centres, which he vehemently opposed.

He is a member of Labour Friends of Israel.

== Roles outside politics ==
Boateng is an active Methodist and is a lay preacher; he served as a Methodist delegate to the World Council of Churches and as Vice-Moderator of its programme to combat racism. During the South African General Elections of 1994, which ended apartheid, he was a member of the delegation sent by the Association of Western European Parliamentarians Against Apartheid to monitor the elections.

He previously served on the board of the English National Opera (1984 to 1997) and the English Touring Opera (1993 to 1997). In 1993, he wrote the foreword to the HarperCollins collected works edition of Jane Austen's Sense and Sensibility. He has been a commentator and television presenter on programmes including Channel 4's Nothing But The Truth and BBC Radio 4's Looking Forward to the Past.

In 2011, he was a non-executive Director of Aegis Defence Services, a private security, military and risk management company founded by controversial arms dealer Lt Colonel Tim Spicer, who was at the heart of the Sandline affair but had left by 2013.

Boateng was serving on the executive board of the international Christian charity Food for the Hungry, in 2012 and is a trustee of the Planet Earth Institute along with chairman Álvaro Sobrinho.

Boateng is a vice-president of The London Library.

In 2014, he became the chair of charity BookAid International.

In 2019, he became Chancellor of the University of Greenwich.

== Honours and awards ==
In 1988, the Southern Christian Leadership Conference honoured Boateng as the recipient of the Dr. Martin Luther King Jr. Award for his contributions to the field of civil rights.

In 2003, Boateng was named on the list of "100 Great Black Britons".

He received honorary Doctor of Law degrees from West London University on 25 July 2018, Lincoln University (Pennsylvania) in 2004 and the University of Bristol in 2007.

Boateng was appointed Commander of the Royal Victorian Order (CVO) in the 2023 Birthday Honours for services as a trustee of the Duke of Edinburgh's International Award.

== Personal life ==
Boateng is married to Janet, a former councillor in Lambeth. They have two sons and three daughters. In November 2011, Boateng's son Benjamin, then aged 27, was jailed for almost four years for a sex attack on a woman.

== See also ==
- Black British elite, the class that Boateng belongs to.

Parliament of the United Kingdom
Preceded by Laurie Pavitt	Member of Parliament for Brent South; 1987–2005	Succeeded by Dawn Butler
Political offices
Preceded by Alistair Burt	Minister for the Disabled; 1997–1998	Succeeded by Margaret Hodge
Preceded by Alun Michael	Minister of State for Home Affairs; 1998–2001	Succeeded by John Denham
Preceded by Stephen Timms	Financial Secretary to the Treasury; 2001–2002	Succeeded by Ruth Kelly
Preceded by Andrew Smith	Chief Secretary to the Treasury; 2002–2005	Succeeded by Des Browne
Diplomatic posts
Preceded by Ann Grant	British High Commissioner to South Africa; 2005–2009	Succeeded by Nicola Brewer
Orders of precedence in the United Kingdom
Preceded by The Lord Hutton of Furness	Gentlemen; Baron Boateng	Followed by The Lord McConnell of Glenscorrodale
