= Laurie Pavitt =

British politician

Portrait by Walter Bird, 1960

Laurence Anstice Pavitt (1 February 1914 – 14 December 1989) was a Labour and Co-operative Party politician in the United Kingdom.

Pavitt was a lifelong pacifist and a conscientious objector in the Second World War. He was secretary of the British Federation of Young Co-operators 1942-46 and general secretary of the Anglo-Chinese Development Society 1946–52.

He served as a councillor on the Municipal Borough of Ilford 1949-52 and was national organiser of the Medical Practitioners' Union 1956–59.

Pavitt was Labour Co-operative Member of Parliament for Willesden West from 1959 to 1974, and for Brent South from 1974 until he retired in 1987. He was parliamentary private secretary to the Foreign Secretary from 1965, and was an Assistant government whip from 1974 to 1976.

== Sources ==
- Times Guide to the House of Commons, 1966, 1983 and 1987 editions
- Leigh Rayment's Peerage Pages

Parliament of the United Kingdom
Preceded by Samuel Viant	Member of Parliament for Willesden West; 1959–Feb 1974	Constituency abolished
New constituency	Member of Parliament for Brent South; Feb 1974–1987	Succeeded by Paul Boateng
