= Walter Farthing =

Member of Parliament for Frome
- In office 5 July 1945 – 23 February 1950
- Preceded by: Mavis Tate
- Succeeded by: constituency abolished

Personal details
- Born: Walter John Farthing; 4 July 1887 Bridgwater, Somerset
- Died: 29 November 1954 (aged 67)
- Party: Labour

Walter John Farthing (4 July 1887 – 29 November 1954) was a British Labour Party politician.

== Biography ==
Born in Bridgwater, Farthing became involved in the trade union movement, and founded a trades council in the town. He was elected as the trades council's president in 1917, and served on Bridgwater Borough Council for the Labour Party from 1929. He was also elected to the executive of the Transport and General Workers' Union. In 1939/40, he served as Mayor of Bridgwater.

He was elected at the 1945 general election as Member of Parliament (MP) for Frome, and held the seat until the constituency was abolished, and he retired, at the 1950 general election.

Parliament of the United Kingdom
Preceded by Mavis Tate	Member of Parliament for Frome; 1945–1950	Constituency abolished
