= National Union of Packing Case Makers (Wood and Tin), Box Makers, Sawyers and Mill Workers =

Former trade union of the United Kingdom

National Union of Packing Case Makers
- National Union of Packing Case Makers (Wood and Tin), Box Makers, Sawyers and Mill Workers
- Merged into: Amalgamated Society of Woodworkers
- Founded: 1872
- Dissolved: 1965
- Headquarters: 95 Farringdon Road, London
- Location: United Kingdom
- Members: 5,038 (1948)
- Affiliations: TUC, ITUC

The National Union of Packing Case Makers (Wood and Tin), Box Makers, Sawyers and Mill Workers was a trade union principally representing workers involved in making packaging in the United Kingdom.

The union was founded in 1872 as the London Wood and Tin Packing Case Makers' Society. It initially focused on providing benefits for members who were out of work, and attempting to negotiate minimum wage rates for the industry. Its membership remained small for many years, peaking at 521 in 1890, but dropping to only 192 in 1910. That decade, it broadened its remit, adopting its final name, and membership began increasing, reaching 5,038 in 1948.

By the 1960s, membership of the union was again falling, dropping to 3,408 in 1964. The following year, it decided to merge into the Amalgamated Society of Woodworkers.

== General Secretaries ==
E. Hammond
1923: R. James
1927: A. Sawyer
1934: R. James
1952: S. G. Reading
