= Willesden West =

Parliamentary constituency in the United Kingdom, 1918–1974

- Former borough constituency for the House of Commons

1918–February 1974
- Seats: one
- Created from: Harrow (small part of)
- Replaced by: Brent East and Brent South

Willesden West was a constituency in Middlesex adjoining the County of London and forming part of the London conurbation, in London itself from 1965. It returned one member to the House of Commons of the UK Parliament 1918–1974.

The outcome of the seat switched permanently to electing the Labour candidate, in 1923 — save for the four-year term when the party's number of MPs fell from 327 to 52 seats (1931-1935) and when the seat elected notable women's right advocate Mrs Mavis Tate.

== History ==
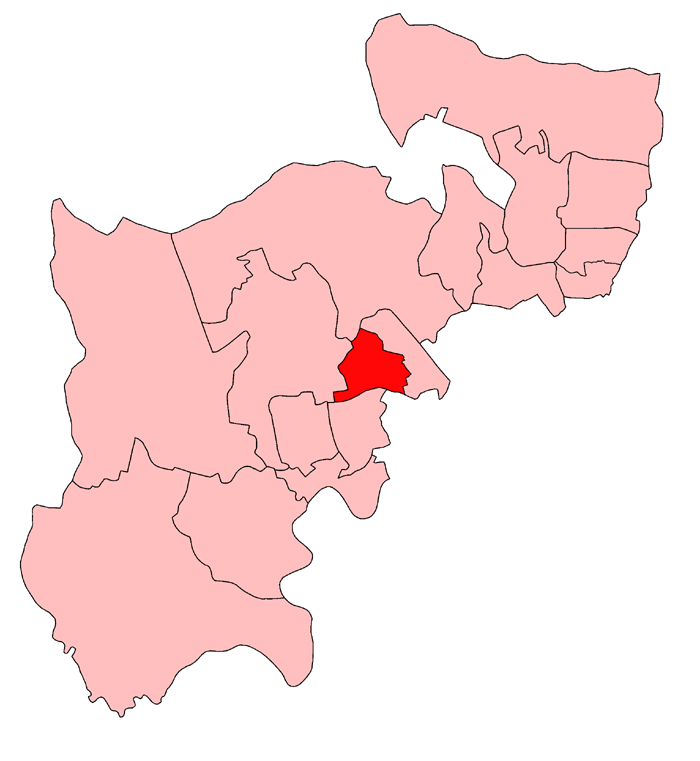
Willesden West constituency within the parliamentary county of Middlesex, showing boundaries used from 1918 to 1945.

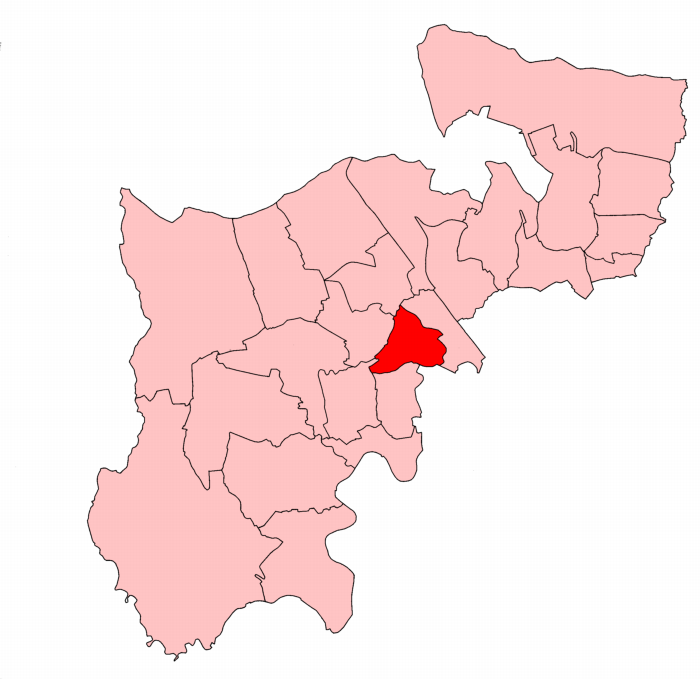
Willesden West constituency within the parliamentary county of Middlesex, showing boundaries used from 1945 to 1950.

Map that gives each named seat and any constant electoral success for national (Westminster) elections for Middlesex, 1955 to 1974.

Until 1918, Willesden formed part of the Harrow Division of Middlesex. The constituency was created by the Representation of the People Act 1918, and was first contested in the general election of that year. The boundaries were altered by further legislation in 1948 and the constituency was abolished when new seats based on the London Boroughs created by the London Government Act 1963 came into use for the February 1974 general election. The area of the constituency was divided between the two new seats of Brent East and Brent North.

In 1966, 13.3% of the constituency was born in the New Commonwealth.

== Boundaries ==
The 1918 legislation created a new parliamentary borough of Willesden, identical in area with the urban district of Willesden, and divided it into two single-member divisions. Willesden West comprised five of the eleven wards of the urban district: Church End, Harlesden, Roundwood, Stonebridge and Willesden Green. The remaining six wards formed the Willseden East division. In 1933 Willesden was incorporated as a municipal borough, although this made no change to the parliamentary divisions.

When constituencies were redrawn prior to the 1950 general election, Willesden West was redefined in terms of seven wards of the borough as they then existed: Church End, Harlesden, Kensal Rise, Manor, Roundwood, Stonebridge and Willesden Green. Kensal Rise had previously formed part of Willesden East.

== Members of Parliament ==
Election	Member	Party
1918	Charles Pinkham	Conservative
1922	George James Furness	Conservative
1923	Samuel Viant	Labour
1931	Mavis Tate	Conservative
1935	Samuel Viant	Labour
1959	Laurie Pavitt	Labour
Feb 1974	constituency abolished	

== Elections ==
=== Elections in the 1910s ===
General election 1918: Willesden West
Party		Candidate	Votes	%	±%
C	Unionist	Charles Pinkham	10,503	54.1	
	Labour	Samuel Viant	7,217	37.2	
	Liberal	John Smyth Crone	1,697	8.7	
Majority			3,286	16.9	
Turnout			19,417	53.3	
	Unionist win (new seat)				
C indicates candidate endorsed by the coalition government.

=== Elections in the 1920s ===
General election 1922: Willesden West
Party	Candidate	Votes	%	±%
Unionist	George James Furness	13,328	51.5	−2.6
Labour	Samuel Viant	12,529	48.5	+11.3
Majority		799	3.0	−13.9
Turnout		25,857	66.7	+13.4
Unionist hold		Swing		

General election 1923: Willesden West
Party	Candidate	Votes	%	±%
Labour	Samuel Viant	14,004	51.3	+2.8
Unionist	George James Furness	8,256	30.3	−18.2
Liberal	David Cleghorn Thomson	5,030	18.4	New
Majority		5,748	21.0	N/A
Turnout		27,290	69.1	+1.4
Labour gain from Unionist		Swing	+12.0	

General election 1924: Willesden West
Party	Candidate	Votes	%	±%
Labour	Samuel Viant	14,884	47.3	−4.0
Unionist	Mitford Brice	13,539	43.0	+12.7
Liberal	James McCulloch	3,061	9.7	−8.7
Majority		1,345	4.3	−16.7
Turnout		31,484	77.6	+8.5
Labour hold		Swing		

General election 1929: Willesden West
Party	Candidate	Votes	%	±%
Labour	Samuel Viant	20,583	52.3	+5.0
Unionist	Malcolm McCorquodale	12,779	32.4	−9.6
Liberal	Arthur Lewis Leighton	6,038	15.3	+5.6
Majority		7,804	19.9	+15.6
Turnout		39,400	73.4	−4.2
Labour hold		Swing	+7.8	

=== Elections in the 1930s ===
General election 1931: Willesden West
Party	Candidate	Votes	%	±%
Conservative	Mavis Tate	23,910	60.6	+28.2
Labour	Samuel Viant	15,550	39.4	−12.9
Majority		8,360	21.2	N/A
Turnout		39,460	71.7	−1.7
Conservative gain from Labour		Swing		

General election 1935: Willesden West
Party	Candidate	Votes	%	±%
Labour	Samuel Viant	19,402	54.1	+14.7
Conservative	Sigmund Samuel	16,472	45.9	−14.7
Majority		2,930	8.2	N/A
Turnout		35,874	64.4	−7.3
Labour gain from Conservative		Swing		

General Election 1939–40

Another General Election was required to take place before the end of 1940. The political parties had been making preparations for an election to take place and by the Autumn of 1939, the following candidates had been selected;

- Labour: Samuel Viant
- Conservative:

=== Elections in the 1940s ===
General election 1945: Willesden West
Party	Candidate	Votes	%	±%
Labour	Samuel Viant	26,566	72.2	+18.1
Conservative	JB Cartland	10,236	27.8	−18.1
Majority		16,330	44.4	+36.2
Turnout		36,802	70.5	+6.1
Labour hold		Swing		

=== Elections in the 1950s ===
General election 1950: Willesden West
Party	Candidate	Votes	%	±%
Labour	Samuel Viant	33,963	61.1	−11.1
Conservative	Attracta Rewcastle	17,848	32.1	+3.3
Liberal	Sirdar Karan S.B. Ahluwalia	2,853	5.1	New
Communist	David Michaelson	938	1.7	New
Majority		16,115	29.0	−15.4
Turnout		55,602	83.2	+12.7
Labour hold		Swing		

General election 1951: Willesden West
Party	Candidate	Votes	%	±%
Labour	Samuel Viant	35,296	64.3	+3.2
Conservative	John L Bott	19,632	35.7	+3.6
Majority		15,664	28.6	−0.4
Turnout		54,928		
Labour hold		Swing		

General election 1955: Willesden West
Party	Candidate	Votes	%	±%
Labour	Samuel Viant	29,185	61.8	−2.5
Conservative	Peter B Kenyon	18,074	38.2	+2.5
Majority		11,111	23.6	−5.0
Turnout		47,259	74.4	
Labour hold		Swing	-2.5	

General election 1959: Willesden West
Party	Candidate	Votes	%	±%
Labour Co-op	Laurence Pavitt	25,680	57.2	−4.6
Conservative	Pamela S Brookes	17,946	39.9	+1.7
Communist	Leslie G Burt	1,324	2.9	New
Majority		7,734	17.3	−5.7
Turnout		44,950	73.0	−1.4
Labour Co-op hold		Swing		

=== Elections in the 1960s ===
General election 1964: Willesden West
Party	Candidate	Votes	%	±%
Labour Co-op	Laurence Pavitt	23,862	62.8	+5.6
Conservative	John S Grose	12,961	34.2	−5.7
Communist	Leslie G Burt	1,130	3.0	+0.1
Majority		10,901	28.6	+11.3
Turnout		37,953	63.5	−9.5
Labour Co-op hold		Swing		

General election 1966: Willesden West
Party	Candidate	Votes	%	±%
Labour Co-op	Laurence Pavitt	24,944	68.5	+5.7
Conservative	A Pamela Thomas	10,362	28.4	−5.7
Communist	Leslie G Burt	1,140	3.1	+0.1
Majority		14,582	40.1	+11.5
Turnout		36,446	63.6	+0.1
Labour Co-op hold		Swing	+5.7	

=== Elections in the 1970s ===
General election 1970: Willesden West
Party	Candidate	Votes	%	±%
Labour Co-op	Laurence Pavitt	21,918	67.2	−1.3
Conservative	Ronald F Dyason	10,163	31.2	+2.8
Communist	Leslie G Burt	515	1.6	−1.5
Majority		11,755	36.0	−4.1
Turnout		32,596	59.3	−4.3
Labour Co-op hold		Swing	+2.0	
