= Sheriff of Middlesex =

Ceremonial officer of Middlesex, England

This is a list of sheriffs of Middlesex.

== History of the office ==
From c. 1131 to 1889 there was no separate sheriff for the county. By a charter of Henry I the livery of the City of London were given the right to elect two sheriffs of "London and Middlesex" on a payment of £300 per annum to the Crown. This continued until 1889, when the Local Government Act 1888 came into force. A single High Sheriff of Middlesex was thereafter appointed in the same manner as other English counties. At the same time, the most populous parts of Middlesex were included in the new County of London, which had its own high sheriff.

The office ceased to exist in 1965, when Middlesex was abolished. The majority of the area became part of the jurisdiction of the High Sheriff of Greater London.

== List of sheriffs ==
- 1044: Esgar the Staller
- 1066: Geoffrey de Mandeville
- Roger de Rames
- 1103: Hugh of Buckland

=== 1131–1888 ===
See List of Sheriffs of London

=== 1889–1899 ===
Note: the years shown are the shrieval years. Sheriffs were appointed at a meeting of the privy council generally held in February or March and held office until the similar meeting in the next year. For example, high sheriff appointed in March 1892 "for the year 1892" held office until March 1893.

- 1889: Colonel Edward John Stracey-Clitherow, of Boston House, Brentford
- 1890: Colonel Charles Edward Gostling-Murray, of Whitton Park, Hounslow
- 1891: Sir John Gibbons, 5th Baronet, of Stanwell Place, Staines, Bt.
- 1892: Edward Montague Nelson of Hanger Hill House, Ealing
- 1893: Lieutenant-Colonel William Horatio Harfield of Sunbury Court, Sunbury
- 1894: Thomas Francis Blackwell of The Cedars, Harrow Weald
- 1895: August Christoph Rudolf de Wette of Hampton House, Hampton Court
- 1896: Walter Barnard Byles of Harefield House, Harefield
- 1897: Lieutenant-Colonel Bernard Tindal Bosanquet of Fairholme, Teddington
- 1898: Irwin Edward Bainbridge Cox of Moat Mount, Mill Hill

=== 1899–1909 ===
- 1899: Francis Augustus Bevan of Trent Park, Enfield
- 1900: John Walker Ford of Enfield Old Park, Winchmore Hill
- 1901: Frederick Cox of Harefield Place, Harefield
- 1902: Cory Francis Cory-Wright of Northwood, Hornsey Lane
- 1903: Lieutenant Alfred Henry Tarleton of Breakspears, Uxbridge
- 1904: Joseph Edward Lilley of The Chestnuts, Wealdstone
- 1905: Cecil Fane De Salis of Dawley Court, Uxbridge
- 1906: Alexander Keith Carlyon of Mount Park, Harrow
- 1907: Thomas Croysdale of Hawke House, Sunbury
- 1908: Sir George Barham of Sudbury Park, Wembley

=== 1909–1919 ===
- 1909: Edward Otter of Stanhope Park, Greenford
- 1910: Edward Moore of 19 Cumberland Terrace, Regent's Park
- 1911: Sir William John Crump of Glenthorn, Harrow Weald
- 1912: Arthur Nockolds Gilbey of Swakeleys, Uxbridge
- 1913: Philip William Poole Carlyon-Britton of Hanham Court, Gloucestershire and 43 Bedford Square, London SW
- 1914: George Acton Davis of Julian Hill, Harrow on the Hill
- 1915: Gibbons Grinling of Fairfield, Harrow Weald
- 1916: George William Barber of Park House, Englefield Green, Surrey
- 1917: Henry Burt of 15 Albert Court, Kensington Gore, London SW
- 1918: Stanley Marseille Dent of 13 Westbourne Street, Hyde Park, London W

=== 1919–1929 ===
- 1919: Edward Laurence Hamilton of the Cedars, South Mimms
- 1920: John William Burton of 15 Collingham Gardens, SW5
- 1921: John McEwan of Carisbrooke, Enfield
- 1922: Alfred William Perkin of Greenford Green, Harrow
- 1923: John Maitland of Blythwood, Enfield
- 1924: Alfred Hollington of The Cottage, The Ridgeway, Potters Bar
- 1925: Henry Walter Peal of Oakhurst, St Stephen's Road, Ealing
- 1926: Colonel Cecil Henry Pank of Westfield, Hadley Wood
- 1927: Percy Barlow of Torkington House, Acton
- 1928: Colonel Sir Henry Ferryman Bowles of Forty Hill, Enfield, Baronet.

=== 1929–1939 ===
- 1929: Major Sir William Henry Prescott of Allington House, White Hart Lane, Tottenham
- 1930: Lieutenant-Colonel Sir Charles Pinkham of 127 Dartmouth Road, Cricklewood
- 1931: James Warren of Capel House, Bullsmoor Lane, Waltham Cross
- 1932: Lieutenant-Colonel Montagu Francis Markham Sloane Kittoe of Leafland, Harrow on the Hill
- 1933: John Smyth Crone, of Castlereagh, Cleveland Road, W13
- 1934: Forrester Clayton, of 7 Gunnersbury Avenue, Ealing
- 1935: Colonel Edwin James King of the Old House, East Finchley
- 1936: George James Furness of Roundwood House, Willesden
- 1937: Sir Howard Stransom Button of The Cedar House, Hillingdon
- 1938: Colonel Augustus Mervyn Owen Anwyl-Passingham of 34 St. Leonard's Terrace, London SW3

=== 1939–1949 ===
- 1939: George James Barnard Furness of Sheridan, Grimms Hill, Great Missenden, Buckinghamshire (son of 1936 high sheriff)
- 1940: Sir Gilfrid Gordon Craig of The Grange, Hillingdon
- 1941: William Micah Bolton of "Meloch", Harlesden Road, NW10
- 1942: Lieutenant-Colonel Robert Walker Roylance of 6 Wellesley House, Lower Sloane Street SW1
- 1943: John William Catlow of 148 Anson Road, Cricklewood, NW2
- 1944: Group Captain Alan Sydney Whitehorn Dore of Eastcote Point, Cuckoo Hill, Pinner
- 1945: Rowland Richard Robbins of Hollycroft, Sipson, West Drayton
- 1946: Clement Edward Page Taylor of Woodthorpe, 37 Stonebridge Park, NW10
- 1947: Colonel Robert Robertson Kimmitt, of 8, Cleveland Road, Ealing, W.13.
- 1948: Brevet-Colonel Maurice Browne, Middlesex Regiment, Inglis Barracks, Mill Hill, N.W.7.

=== 1949–1959 ===
- 1949: George Weston of 10, Sutherland Avenue, Paddington W.9.
- 1950: Herbert John Nias, of Aysgarth, College Road, Isleworth
- 1951: John Donaldson Craig of Old Manor Cottage, Park Road, Teddington
- 1952: Harold Walter Jones of 10, The Paddocks, Wembley Park, Wembley
- 1953: Major Arthur John Lewer, of Boundary House, Green Walk, Norwood Green, Southall
- 1954: William Reginald Clemens of 90, Beaufort Park, Hampstead Garden Suburb, N.W.11.
- 1955: Charles William Skinner of 96, Alderman's Hill, Palmers Green, N.13.
- 1956: Arthur Hillier, of 31, Arlington House, Arlington Street, S.W.1.
- 1957: Charles Bennett Baggs, of Laurel Bank, Holders Hill Road, Hendon, N.W.4.
- 1958: Sir (Stanley) Graham Rowlandson, of 16, Welbeck Street, London W.1.

=== 1959–1965 ===
- 1959: Herbert Charles Nias, of "Whyte Leafe", The Ridgeway, Fetcham, Surrey.
- 1960: Sir Christopher George Armstrong Cowan, of Kiln Farm, Rickmansworth Road, Northwood.
- 1961: Lieutenant-Colonel Alfred James Ross, of Frethun Cottage, 20 Grimsdyke Crescent, Barnet, Hertfordshire
- 1962: Major George Robert Hesketh Wrangham, of 26 The Avenue, Ealing, London W.13.
- 1963: Colonel Sir Joseph Henry Haygarth, of "Braeside", Manor Park Gardens, Edgware.
- 1964: Frederick John Charles Ingram of 52 Vivian Way, Deansway, London N.2.
- 1965 onwards: See High Sheriff of Greater London

== See also ==
- Sheriffs of the City of London
