= Samuel Viant =

British politician (1882–1964)

Samuel Phillip Viant CBE JP MP (5 January 1882 – 19 May 1964) was a British Labour Party politician.

Born in Plymouth, and educated at Devonport Higher Grade School, Viant worked as a carpenter and moved to London. There, he became active in the abstinence movement and also in the Amalgamated Society of Carpenters and Joiners and the Independent Labour Party. He studied at Paddington School for Social Science and Ruskin College. He actively campaigned across the country for the Co-operative movement as well as the Independent Labour Party, and prior to 1914 served as vice chair of the Conciliation Committee for the Building Industry. In 1915 he became a member of the Executive of the London Labour Party. Unsuccessful in gaining election to both Paddington and Willesden councils, Viant did become Vice Chairman of Paddington Trades Council. At the 1918 general election, he stood unsuccessfully for the Labour Party in Willesden West.

Viant was finally elected to Willesden Council in 1919, and was elected as Member of Parliament (MP) for Willesden West at the 1923 general election. He held the seat in 1924 and 1929, and was appointed Assistant Postmaster-General. He lost his seat in 1931, but retook it in 1935, then held it until his retirement in 1959. Viant also served as Chairman of Parliamentary Select Committee on public petitions. In 1960–1, he served as Mayor of Willesden.

Viant was named a Commander of the Order of the British Empire (CBE) in the 1948 Birthday Honours.

Parliament of the United Kingdom
Preceded by George James Furness	Member of Parliament for Willesden West; 1923–1931	Succeeded by Mavis Tate
Preceded by Mavis Tate	Member of Parliament for Willesden West; 1935–1959	Succeeded by Laurie Pavitt
Civic offices
Preceded by Nellie Clark	Mayor of Willesden; 1960–1961	Succeeded by Louise Dunbar
