= Municipal Borough of Willesden =

Former district in Middlesex, England

Coordinates: 51.548°N 0.244°W

Willesden
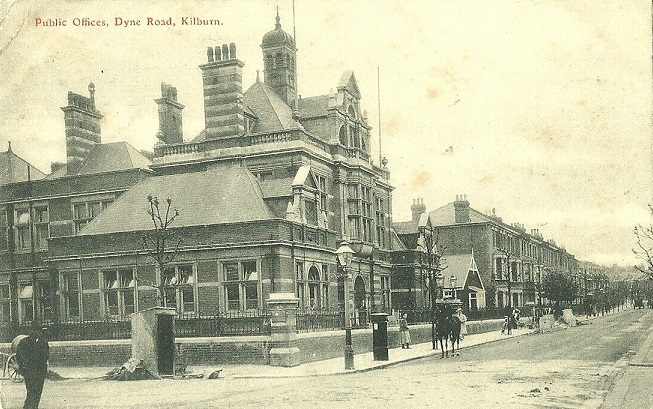
- Willesden Town Hall (demolished in 1972)

- Willesden within Middlesex in 1961
- Area
  - 1911: 4,384 acres (17.74 km^{2})
  - 1931: 4,385 acres (17.75 km^{2})
  - 1961: 4,633 acres (18.75 km^{2})
- Population
  - 1911: 154,214
  - 1931: 184,434
  - 1961: 171,001
- Density
  - 1911: 32/acre
  - 1931: 42/acre
  - 1961: 37/acre
- History
  - Created: 1874
  - Abolished: 1965
  - Succeeded by: London Borough of Brent
- Status: Local board (1874–1894); Urban district (1894–1933); Municipal borough (from 1933)
- Government: Willesden Urban District Council; Willesden Borough Council
  - HQ: Dyne Road, Kilburn
  - Motto: Labore est Orare (To Work is to Pray)
- Coat of arms of the borough council

Willesden was a local government district in the county of Middlesex, England from 1874 to 1965. It formed part of the Metropolitan Police District and London postal district. Willesden was part of the built-up area of London and bordered the County of London to the east and south.

== History ==
It was formed as a local government district in 1874, became an urban district in 1894 and was incorporated as a municipal borough in 1933. In 1901 the population was 114,811. The population peaked in 1931 at 184,434 and by 1961 it had fallen to 171,001. It occupied 4,384 acres (17.74 km^{2}) in 1911 and 4,633 acres (18.75 km^{2}) in 1961. It included the districts of Kilburn, Harlesden, Neasden, Willesden, Cricklewood, Dollis Hill and Brondesbury. The district was abolished in 1965 and its former area transferred to Greater London, merging with the Borough of Wembley to form the London Borough of Brent.

The offices of the local board were established at Dyne Road, Kilburn in 1891. These were later enlarged to become Willesden Town Hall. Following the formation of the London Borough of Brent, administration was transferred to Wembley, and the town hall was demolished in 1972.

== Politics ==
The urban district council elections were not conducted on party political lines until 1910, when pro-Conservative Moderates gained a majority, with Progressive and Labour councillors forming the opposition.

By 1921, Labour was having an increased influence on the council and this led to the formation of an anti-Labour Ratepayers Association, who held power until 1933. From 1933 to abolition in 1965 the borough council was Labour-controlled for all but one year.

== Coat of arms ==
On incorporation in 1933 the borough council was granted a coat of arms. The blazon was as follows:

"Gules a Chevron between in dexter chief an Orb ensigned with a Cross-crosslet Or and in sinister chief and two Swords in saltire proper hilts and pomels Or and in base three Lilies in a Pot all within a Bordure also Or charged with eight Pellets and for a Crest Issuant from a Saxon Crown two Wings Or each charged with a Cinquefoil Gules. And for Supporters: On either side a Dragon Azure gorged with a Saxon Crown Or and charged on the shoulder with two Seaxes in saltire proper hilts and pomels Or."

The Latin motto was Labore est Orare or To Work is to Pray.

Around the chevron in the centre of the shield were symbols representing the history of Willesden. The orb was from the attributed arms of King Athelstan. His granting of the manors of Neasden-cum-Willeseden to the monastery of St Arkenwold is one of the earliest historical references to the area. The crossed swords were taken from the arms of the Diocese of London. This records the fact that the Dean and Chapter of St Paul's Cathedral held the manor of Willesden at the time of the Domesday Book. The pot of lilies are the symbol of the St Mary, patron saint of the ancient parish. The border (or bordure) bore eight black discs or pellets, one for each of the manors into which Anglo-Saxon Willesden was divided.

The crest above the arms was composed of two wings from the arms of Richard Bancroft, Archbishop of Canterbury 1604 - 1610. Bancroft's family held the Manor of Mapesbury. The wings were charged with red cinquefoils or five leaved figures. These were taken from the arms of All Souls College, Oxford. The college owned much land in the Willesden area.

There does not seem to have been any significance in the choice of supporters, which were two blue dragons. Around the neck of each dragon was a gold Saxon crown, and they bore on the shoulder crossed seaxes or notched swords. These emblems were derived from the arms of Middlesex County Council.

Most of the elements of Willesden's arms were incorporated in those of the successor London Borough of Brent in 1965.

== Affiliated Regiment ==
In 1951 the Borough Council adopted 484 Heavy Anti-Aircraft Regiment, Royal Artillery, a Territorial Army unit based in the Borough. It had originally been raised in 1938 from employees of the London Passenger Transport Board. The regiment was disbanded in 1955.
