= The Building Worker =

Statue in Tower Hill, London

- Unknown Construction Worker
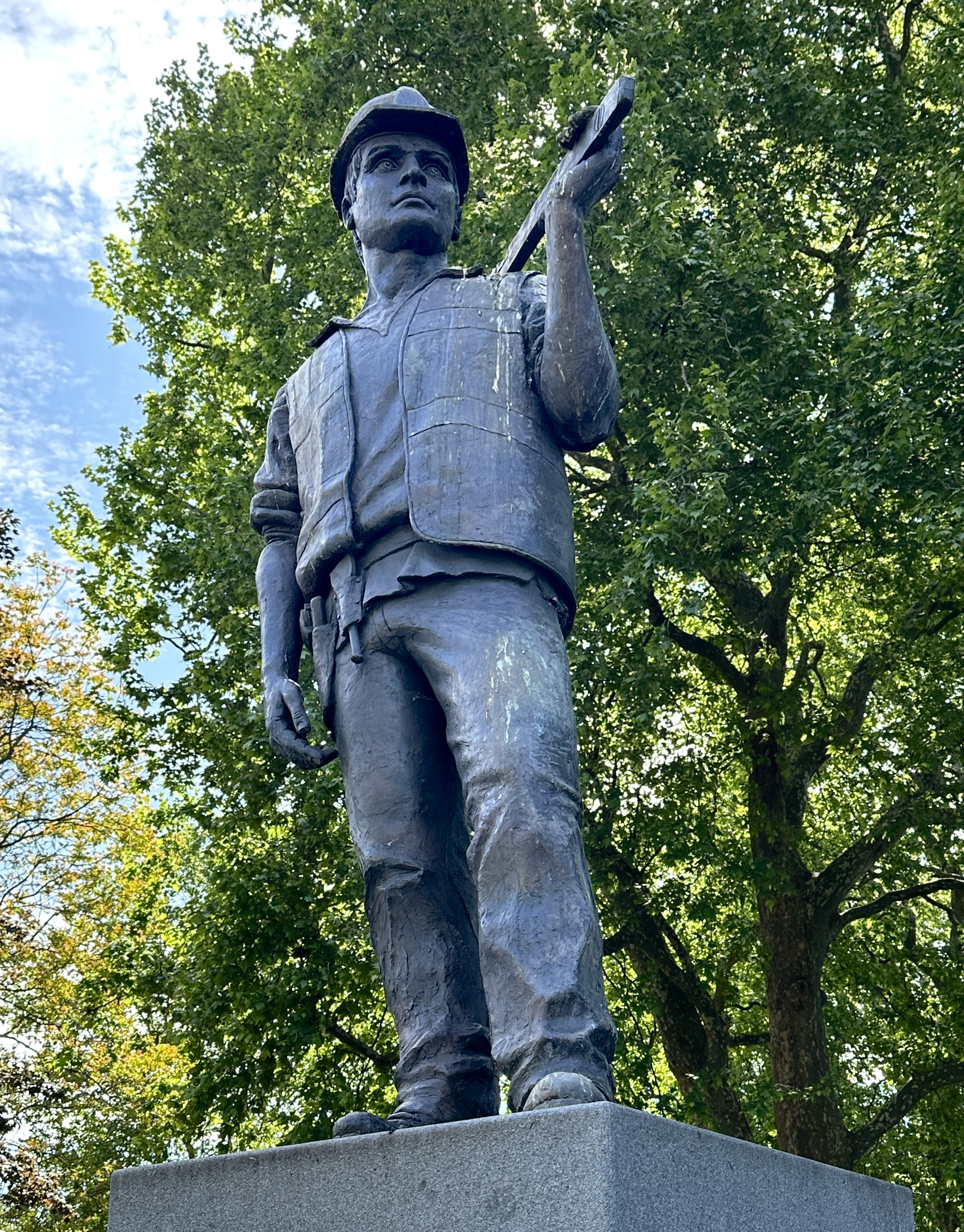
- The statue in 2026
- Artist: Alan Wilson
- Year: 2006
- Medium: Bronze
- Subject: Labour rights
- Location: Tower Bridge Piazza, Tower Hill, London; 51°30′35″N 0°04′31″W

The Building Worker, also known as the Unknown Construction Worker, is a bronze statue and memorial dedicated to construction workers who have died in Great Britain while on building sites. It is a bronze statue resting on a granite pedestal and located at Tower Bridge Piazza in Tower Hill, London. It is loosely based on Michelangelo's David statue and depicts a man wearing a worker's uniform holding a spirit level. It was sculpted by Alan Wilson and cost £100,000.

The statue was unveiled in 2006 following a four-year fundraising effort by the Union of Construction, Allied Trades and Technicians (UCATT) with support from politicians, including London Mayor Ken Livingstone. Each year on International Workers' Memorial Day workers gather to lay wreaths and release balloons in remembrance of those who died during the previous year on construction sites. It is one of many public artworks throughout the city depicting workers.

== Description ==
The Building Worker, also known as the Unknown Construction Worker, is a bronze statue and labour memorial depicting a male worker wearing a uniform and hard hat while holding a spirit level. The design is loosely inspired by Michelangelo's David statue. It weighs 300 kilograms (660 lb) and rests on a granite base. The statue is located in Tower Bridge Piazza, a small green space in Tower Hill, London. The inscription on the statue's plaque reads:

THE BUILDING WORKER

For the thousands of building workers who have lost their lives at work,
we commemorate you.

For the thousands of building workers who are today
building and rebuilding towns and cities across the United Kingdom,
we celebrate you.

UCATT
BUILDING TOGETHER

Unveiled by
Ken Livingstone, Mayor of London and Alan Ritchie, UCATT General Secretary
on the
11th October 2006

Sculptor: Alan Wilson

== History ==
Between 2001 and 2006, hundreds of British construction workers died on building sites. That number continued to grow when large construction projects were taking place for the 2012 Summer Olympics. During the early 2000s, the Union of Construction, Allied Trades and Technicians (UCATT) raised funds for a memorial to those who died on construction sites. Their four-year mission was supported by London Mayor Ken Livingstone, various politicians from the London Assembly and Parliament, and trade unions. The total cost for the memorial was £100,000. The statue was sculpted by Alan Wilson, whose other works include Inspire on Castle Street, Oxford, Mother and Child in Ellesmere Port, Grandmother, Child and Teddy Bear in Blackburn and War Memorial in Royal Wootton Bassett.

The memorial was dedicated on 11 October 2006 with around 200 people in attendance. Alan Ritchie, then-general secretary of UCATT, unveiled the statue. During the ceremony Ritchie said "Our union will continue campaigning for a new law so that individual directors and senior managers are held accountable for accidents at work." Among those in attendance was the widow of Patrick O'Sullivan who died while working on construction of Wembley Stadium. A two-minute silence was observed for the 351 workers who had died during the last five years.

A construction workers' rally took place the following 28 April on International Workers' Memorial Day, the first annual gathering that takes place at the statue. Traditions during this event include laying wreaths and releasing black balloons in honour of those who died on construction sites during the previous year. The event often attracts hundreds of participants from union organisations including Unite. During these events, protests are often held in conjunction. In 2014, attendees gathered at the Embassy of Qatar to draw attention to the human rights concerns of construction workers building stadiums for the 2022 FIFA World Cup. In addition to the safety of construction workers on site, attendees have also called attention to the importance of workers' mental health.

The statue has been criticised by art historian and museum director Tim Knox. He told reporters from The Independent on Sunday and the Today programme "Tower Hill is where great figures in British history have been executed, and we put up a statue in memory of people who died in industrial accidents" and "The problem is that there is no longer the tuition in art schools, so not many people are confident with the human figure. On the one hand we have highly competent artists who are worth millions and the other group who get wheeled in to do public statues for £100,000." His comments were criticised by Ritchie, Ian Leith of the Public Monuments and Sculpture Association and the Workers Revolutionary Party." Ritchie called the comments "elitist and offensive" and said "Thousands of construction workers have lost their lives in building London. Knox clearly would rather that their sacrifice went unrecognised and ignored."

The Building Worker is one of many public artworks throughout London depicting workers. Others include The Cordwainer by Alma Boyes, The Spirit of Brotherhood (also known as The Spirit of Trade Unionism) by Bernard Meadows, Deal Porters by Philip Bews, Out in the Fields by Arthur G Atkinson, The Window Cleaner by Allan Sly, Landed (also known as Dockers) by Les Johnson, Rush Hour by George Segal and the National Firefighters Memorial by John Mills.

== Gallery ==
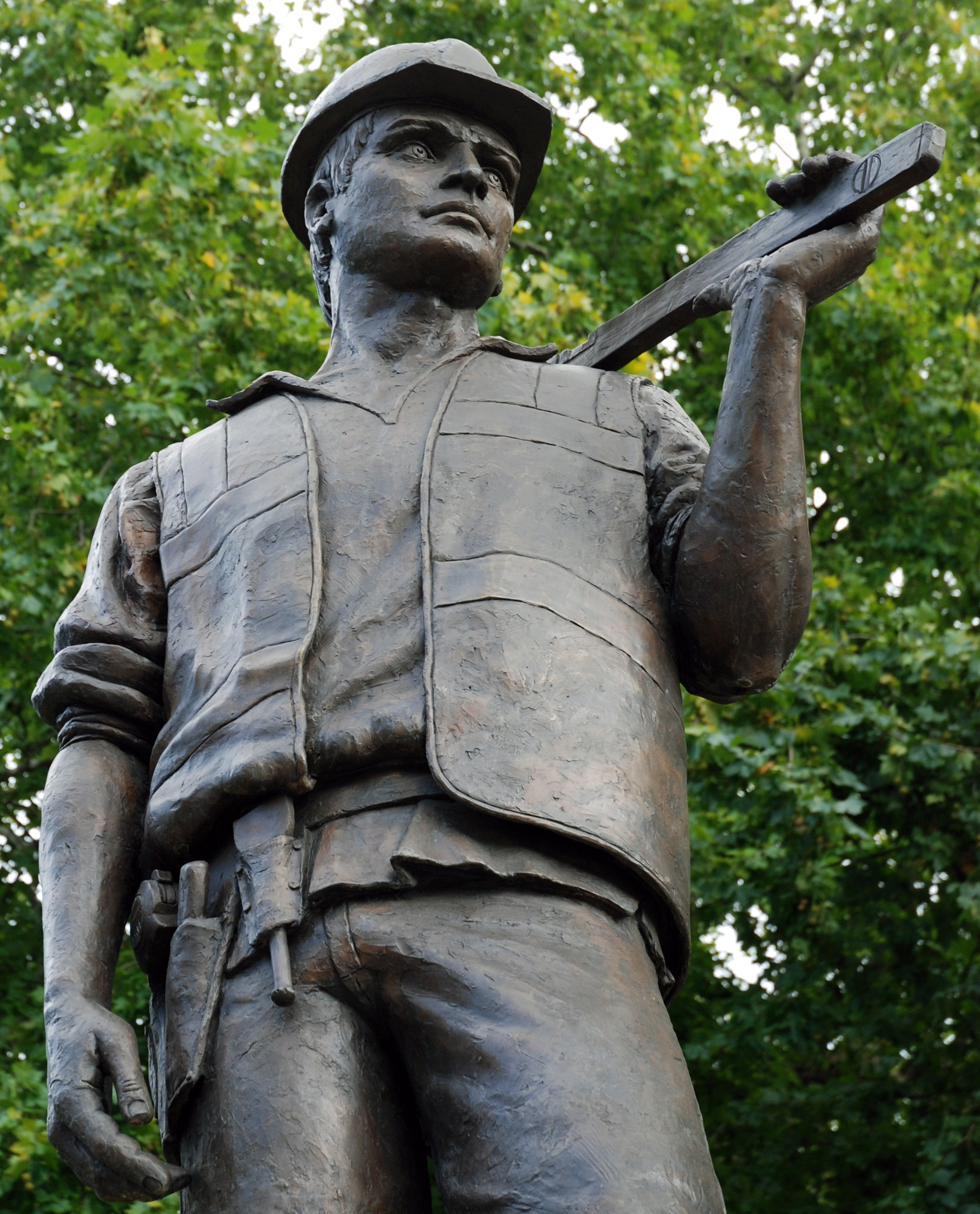
Closeup of the statue

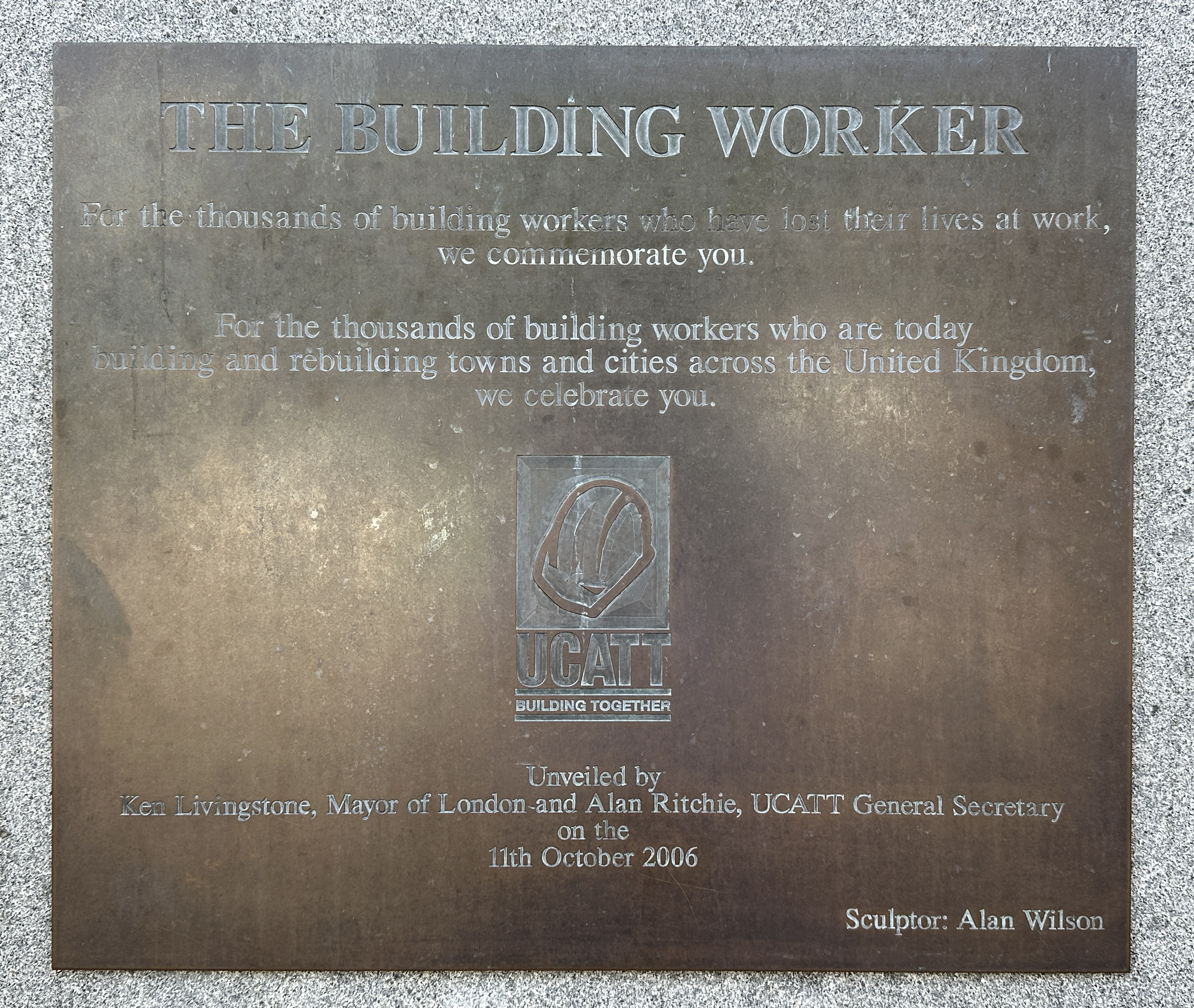
Plaque on the statue base

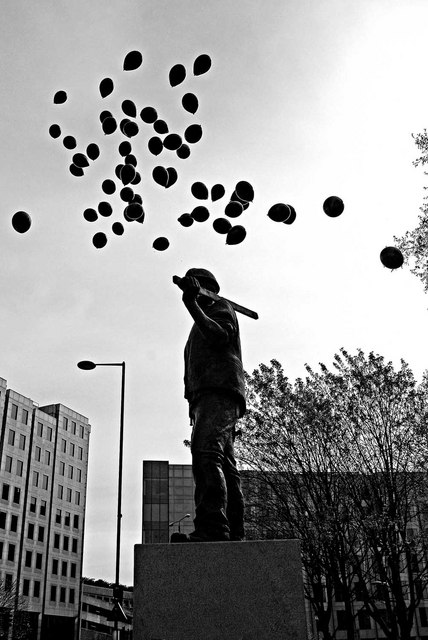
Black balloons being released at the statue on International Workers' Memorial Day

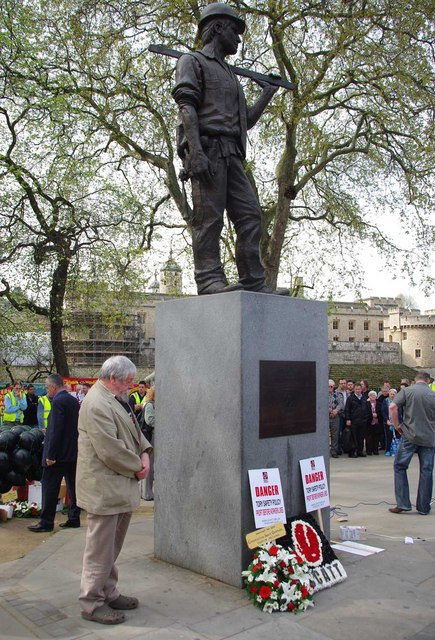
Wreath laying at the statue on International Workers' Memorial Day

== See also ==
- List of public art in the London Borough of Tower Hamlets
