= Hugh Mais =

Sir Robert Hugh Mais (14 September 1907 – 14 February 1996) was a High Court judge in the United Kingdom.

== 1973 picketing trial ==
Hugh Mais was selected as the trial judge for the 1973 trial of those including the "Shrewsbury two", Ricky Tomlinson and Des Warren, charged in relation to picketing in Shrewsbury.

Speaking in the House of Commons on 23 January 2014 David Anderson MP (Blaydon, Labour) said:

The trial judge, Mr Justice Mais, was a surprise choice for such a high-profile, politically charged case. He had little, if any, experience in cases of this magnitude, or in criminal cases at all; his expertise was mainly in rural and ecclesiastical matters. His behaviour throughout the case led many to question his capability and impartiality. A number of issues gave rise to this concern. For example, when the jury were called to bring in the verdict, they were unable to come to a majority decision—they were tied at eight to four. The judge asked them to keep going but they said, “We’re too tired to go on today—we need to have a break.” So he agreed to give them a break and let them stop in a hotel overnight, but he closed by saying:

“You should go to the accommodation prepared for you…and I suggest that you continue your deliberations there.”

That was an extraordinary thing to suggest. The only place where a jury should consider any case is in the jury room and nowhere else, be it a hotel or anywhere else.

If that were the judge’s only error, it would still be wrong, but throughout the trial his behaviour was, to say the least, questionable.

During the same speech Anderson quoted a 2012 statement from a David Altaras who was a junior barrister at the 1973 trial which said, in relation to the judge Hugh Mais:

I vividly recall an occasion when Mr Platt-Mills was cross-examining a witness (probably a police officer) and the Judge took off his wig and threw it on the bench in irritation. I recall occasions when he threw his pen down and turned to face the wall when either a defendant was giving evidence or the defence were adducing evidence in cross-examination. In addition, I can remember his rather rude interruptions during cross-examination.

== Newcastle V sign incident ==
Mais reportedly once had a man arrested in Newcastle for making a V sign at his car. After the individual was held for two hours Mais accepted his explanation that he had mistaken him for the Mayor.
