= The Cordwainer (statue) =

Sculpture in Cordwainer, City of London

- The Cordwainer in 2020
- Artist: Alma Boyes
- Year: 2002
- Medium: Bronze
- Subject: Ward of Cordwainer Club
- Location: Watling Street, Cordwainer, City of London; 51.512823°N 0.093025°W
- Owner: City of London Corporation

The Cordwainer is a life-size bronze statue and memorial on Watling Street in the City of London. It depicts a male cordwainer and was commissioned to mark the 100th anniversary of the Ward of Cordwainer Club. It was unveiled in 2002 and sculpted by artist and teacher Alma Boyes. The Cordwainer is one of many public artworks in London depicting workers.

== Description ==
The Cordwainer is a life-size bronze statue and memorial depicting a male cordwainer, a shoemaker specialising in leatherworks. It is located on Watling Street in the Cordwainer ward of the City of London. It stands bon the north side of St Mary Aldermary after being moved from its original location, the courtyard of St Mary-le-Bow.

Inscriptions on the memorial's two plaques and statue read:

(front plaque)
The Cordwainer

You are in the Ward of Cordwainer which in medieval times was the centre of shoe-making in the City of London. The finest leather from Cordoba in Spain was used which gave rise to the name of the craftsmen and the Ward.

The Cordwainer statue was erected in 2002 to celebrate the centenary of the Ward of Cordwainer Club.

(west plaque)
The Ward of Cordwainer Club thanks the following for their generous contributions to this statue:

The Corporation of London / Mitsubishi Corporation (UK) Plc
Banco Espirito Santo / W H Payne & Co
Barclays Plc / The Worshipful Company of Cordwainers
Drivers Johns / MGC Hart Esq.
King Sturge / A M Tamosius Esq.
Kingston Smith / Members of the Club

(statue, right hip)
Alma Boyes 2002
Morris Singer

== History ==
The memorial was commissioned by the City of London Corporation and Ward of Cordwainer Club to mark the club's 100th anniversary. It was sculpted by artist Alma Boyes, a graduate of the Bath Academy of Art and North Staffordshire Polytechnic who taught at the University of Brighton, and founded by Morris Singer.. The statue was unveiled in February 2002 by Sir Brian Jenkins, who was serving as an alderman for the Ward of Cordwainer at the time.

The Cordwainer is one of many public artworks throughout London depicting workers. Others include The Building Worker by Alan Wilson, The Spirit of Brotherhood (also known as The Spirit of Trade Unionism) by Bernard Meadows, Deal Porters by Philip Bews, Out in the Fields by Arthur G Atkinson, The Window Cleaner by Allan Sly, Landed (also known as Dockers) by Les Johnson, Rush Hour by George Segal and the National Firefighters Memorial by John Mills.

== See also ==
- List of public art in the City of London
