= Union of Construction, Allied Trades and Technicians =

British trade union, 1971–2017

UCATT
- Union of Construction, Allied Trades and Technicians

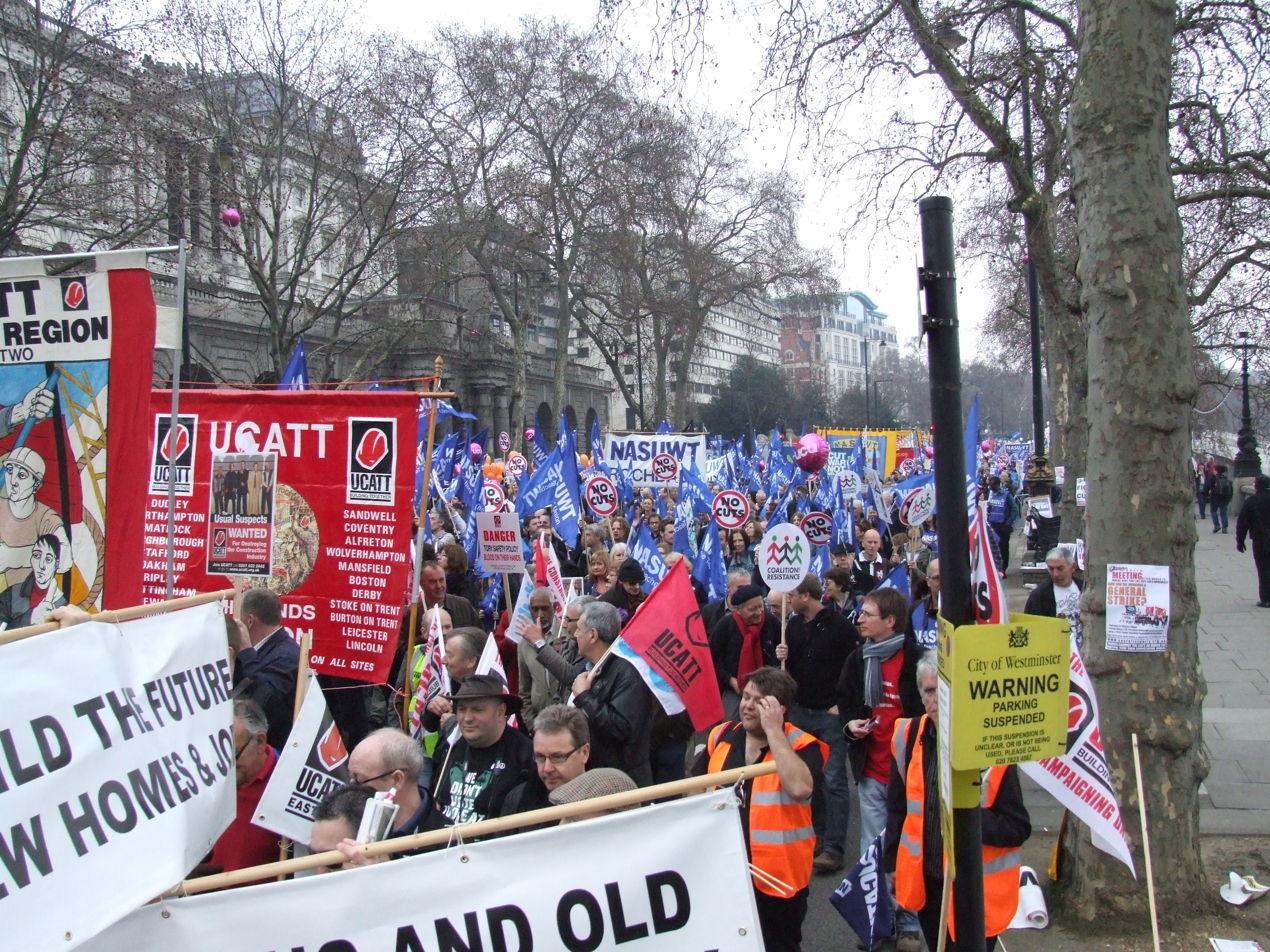
- Rally in London, 2011
- Merged into: Unite
- Founded: 1971
- Dissolved: 1 January 2017
- Headquarters: 177 Abbeville Road, Clapham Common, London
- Location(s): United Kingdom Republic of Ireland
- Members: 347,777 (1980); 47,433 (2015)
- Key people: Brian Rye, acting general secretary
- Publication: Building Worker
- Affiliations: TUC, ICTU, STUC, BWI, CSEU, Labour
- Website: www.ucatt.org.uk

The Union of Construction, Allied Trades and Technicians (UCATT) was a British and Irish trade union, operating in the construction industry. It was founded in 1971, and merged into Unite on 1 January 2017.

It was affiliated to the Trades Union Congress and the Labour Party, as well as to the Building and Wood Workers' International and the EFBWW, European Federation of Building and Wood Workers.

== History ==
=== Formation ===
UCATT was formed in 1971 following the merger of the Amalgamated Union of Building Trade Workers (AUBTW), the Association of Building Technicians and the Amalgamated Society of Woodworkers and Decorators, which had itself been founded the previous year from a merger of the Amalgamated Society of Woodworkers (ASW) and the Amalgamated Society of Painters and Decorators (ASPD).

The merged union was initially known as the Amalgamated Society of Woodworkers, Painters and Builders, but changed its name later in the year. Its first general secretary was Sir George Smith, formerly general secretary of the ASW, who was directly elected by the membership. Its Executive at the time incorporated paid officials who had been selected by an electoral process within the industry.

=== National strike of 1972 ===
In 1972, shortly after its formation, UCATT along with the GMWU and TGWU, two sister unions involved in construction and civil engineering, was involved in a major national joint industrial dispute. For the first time in the building industry, workers all over the country went on strike, demanding a minimum wage of £30 a week and abolition of the 'Lump Labour Scheme', which institutionalised casual cash-paid daily labour without employment rights. The 12-week stoppage affected many major sites, effectively forcing employers to negotiate. The Building Workers' Charter was actively involved in organising the strike.

==== The 'Shrewsbury Two' ====
Unionised workers used flying pickets to seek support from workers on the lump. On 6 September 1972, UCATT and TGWU bussed members from North Wales and Chester to picket building sites in Shrewsbury. Despite confrontations with site management, the police made no arrests on the day.

External videos
- Whose Conspiracy? Justice for the Shrewsbury pickets (2009). A 35-minute film re-examining the political events surrounding the arrest and imprisonment of the Shrewsbury building workers, containing material from the original campaign to free Des Warren and Ricky Tomlinson.

Five months after the strike, at a time when some of the strikers' aims had been largely settled, several building workers were investigated for alleged sabotage and vandalism during the dispute. Some were subject to high-profile police investigation, under pressure from major contractors and politicians anxious to suppress the emergence of organised labour in the building industry, and 24 building workers were convicted at Shrewsbury Crown Court and six jailed as a result of their picketing activities. The longest sentences were given by judge Hugh Mais to Ricky Tomlinson, a plasterer and TGWU strike leader, and Des Warren, a steel fixer and leading lay official of UCATT, who became known as the "Shrewsbury Two".

The 'Shrewsbury Two' refused to testify against fellow strikers at Shrewsbury Crown Court. Charges of affray were dropped, but they were found guilty of "conspiracy to intimidate" under the Conspiracy Act 1875, which had not been used for 98 years. Warren was sentenced to three years in prison, and Tomlinson to two.

Des Warren subsequently developed serious health problems, which Tomlinson attributes to the medication he took whilst in solitary confinement.

Tomlinson took the case to the TUC Annual Congress in 1975, with little result.

In 2004, Des Warren died, without the pardon that his family had campaigned for.

In 2012 Tomlinson and others sought to have the convictions overturned by the Criminal Cases Review Commission. In 2013 a paper petition was launched, alongside the existing e-petition, for an Early Day Motion by MP John McDonnell to be brought.

In May 2020, the Criminal Cases Review Commission referred a number of convictions relating to the Shrewsbury dispute, including that of Ricky Tomlinson, to the Court of Appeal. In March 2021, the Court of Appeal overturned the convictions of Tomlinson, Warren and the other members of the 'Shrewsbury 24' who had been convicted in relation to the 1972 industrial action.

=== 1980s–90s: recession and recovery ===
During the late 1980s and early 1990s, UCATT suffered a long debilitating decline, with successive attacks from a hostile Conservative government. The union faced mounting financial deficits from falling membership rolls, having been reliant upon cash contributions from members collected on site in the age of increasing technology. This decline also coincided with strong rumours of a merger with other unions, notably the TGWU, and gains being made by GMB. During this period, a strong Joint Sites Committee movement of rank and file UCATT, TGWU, GMB and AEEUW members characterised the construction unions' work on sites in major cities, many of whom had remained crowded, unsafe, and casualised places in need of true reform.

In 1990, Albert Williams convinced the union to for the first time unionise self-employed labourers (the "lump"), but his unpopular proposal to merge the union into the Electrical, Electronic, Telecommunications and Plumbing Union led to his suspension by the union's executive, and he retired in 1992. UCATT, however, began a revival under the leadership of George Brumwell, its new general secretary. He led a turnaround in the union's fortunes by 2001, following cost-containing measures including strategic redundancies and closure of several local offices. This programme all but eliminated the deficits, and built a smaller, but more readily sustainable UCATT.

The union ran a 'Safety Culture' campaign across the industry, promoting construction and regeneration, which became part of the strategy of the New Labour government following its election victory in 1997.

=== 2000–2017 ===
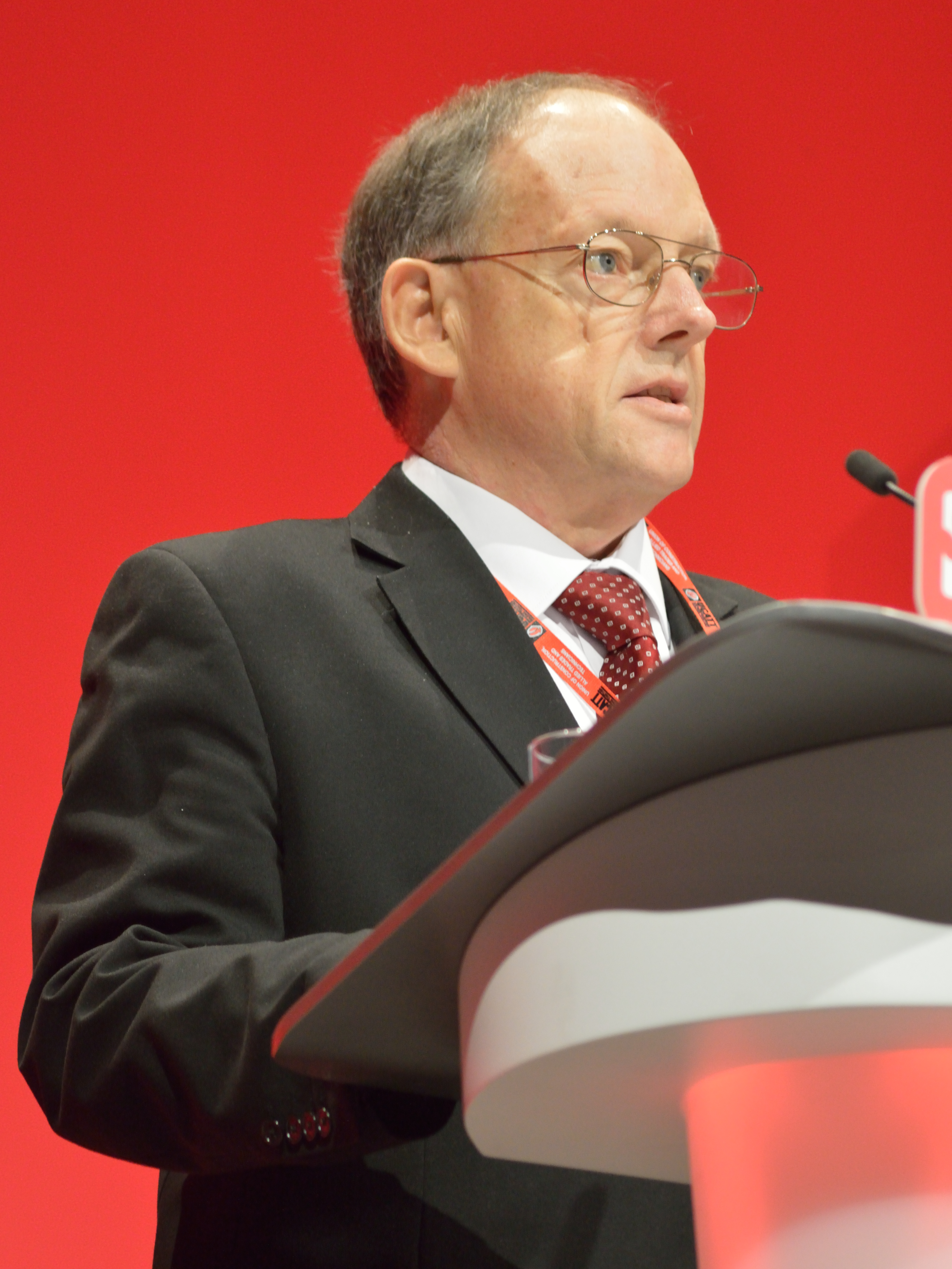
Brian Rye, acting general secretary from 2015 until the merger with Unite the Union

In 2006, UCATT, T&G and GMB, the successors to the joint unions of 1972 ran a seven-day strike on the construction of Heathrow Terminal 5 in pursuit of £1.00 on bonus, and back pay. The employer was Laing O'Rourke the successor to John Laing Ltd, one of the big employers of 1972. After the dispute was resolved the strikers received 80% of their original aims and substantial back pay. That same year The Building Worker was unveiled following a four-year campaign by UCATT to honor workers who died on construction sites in the country.

UCATT represented the views of site workers on the government/industry body, the Strategic Forum for Construction, from 2001 to 2015.

Membership continued to dwindle; in December 2012, it had 84,377 workers in construction and allied trades.

In May 2016, UCATT's conference voted to seek a merger with Unite the Union, though this would only proceed if approved by a vote of all members. The decision followed a decline in UK membership (from almost 112,000 in 1999 to 54,644 at the end of 2014, plus a further 6,585 in the Republic of Ireland), and mounting financial troubles (it incurred a net deficit of over £3.5 million in 2014 and at year-end had net current liabilities of more than £1 million, leading to "significant doubt about the union’s ability to continue as a going concern"). The merger, approved by 85.5% of members in November 2016 and taking effect from 1 January 2017, spelt the end of a separate or independent construction union but was expected to force employers to negotiate with a larger and more powerful union. UCATT's members in the Republic of Ireland voted to instead transfer to the Technical Engineering and Electrical Union.

== Election results ==
The union sponsored Labour Party candidates in several Parliamentary elections.

Election	Constituency	Candidate	Votes	Percentage	Position
Feb 1974 general election	Houghton-le-Spring	Tom Urwin	23,263	76.9	1
Feb 1974 general election	Liverpool Walton	Eric Heffer	20,057	53.7	1
Feb 1974 general election	Rochester and Chatham	Roger Kenward	23,483	37.4	2
Oct 1974 general election	Houghton-le-Spring	Tom Urwin	29,699	68.4	1
Oct 1974 general election	Liverpool Walton	Eric Heffer	20,568	58.0	1
Oct 1974 general election	Rochester and Chatham	Robert Bean	26,467	43.4	1
1979 general election	Houghton-le-Spring	Tom Urwin	30,181	68.5	1
1979 general election	Leeds North West	Peter O'Grady	17,623	35.1	2
1979 general election	Liverpool Walton	Eric Heffer	20,231	55.2	1
1979 general election	Rochester and Chatham	Robert Bean	24,886	42.8	2
1983 general election	Liverpool Walton	Eric Heffer	26,980	52.7	1
1983 general election	Medway	Robert Bean	13,851	30.1	2
1987 general election	Liverpool Walton	Eric Heffer	34,661	64.4	1

== Leadership ==
Following a rule-change in 1995, UCATT had a lay Executive Council to which an elected general secretary reported. Following Brumwell, Alan Ritchie, formerly the Scottish regional secretary, was elected, but was forced to stand down in March 2011 over voting irregularities, with George Guy appointed acting general secretary until the election was re-run in October 2011. Steven Murphy was subsequently elected and took office in 2012.

=== General Secretaries ===
1971: George Smith
1978: Les Wood
1985: Albert Williams
1992: George Brumwell
2004: Alan Ritchie
2012: George Guy (acting)
2012: Steve Murphy
2015: Brian Rye (acting)

=== Assistant General Secretaries ===
1971: Les Wood
1978: Jimmy Hardman

== Sources ==
- UCATT family tree
