= Cyril Demarne =

Cyril Demarne OBE
- Born: 7 February 1905; Poplar, London, United Kingdom
- Died: 28 January 2007 (aged 101)
- Occupations: British wartime firefighter Author
- Spouse: Alice Blanche
- Children: Two daughters; Josephine and Marji

Cyril Thomas Demarne, OBE (7 February 1905 – 28 January 2007) was a British firefighter. He served in London during the Second World War, throughout the Blitz. He was later involved in establishing aviation firefighting units in Australasia and in Beirut. In retirement, he wrote several books based on his wartime experiences.

== Early life ==
Demarne was born in Poplar, London, the eldest of three sons and two daughters of a City clerk; when his father lost his job through illness, the family's living standards suffered: "Sometimes we sat in the dark, for there was no penny for the gas." Demarne recalled seeing, as a boy, troops marching from Woolwich through the Blackwall Tunnel with horses pulling the guns. Most distinctly, he remembered the Zeppelin raids on London in 1915 and witnessing the downing of the Schütte-Lanz SL11 (1916) for which William Leefe Robinson was awarded the Victoria Cross. Those dramatic events were a precursor of the relentless bombing of the capital 25 years later.

He joined the West Ham Fire Brigade in 1925 and was a Sub-Officer instructing the Auxiliary Fire Service when war was declared.

== World War II ==
He spent the period from September 1940 to May 1941 serving in West Ham, one of the most heavily bombed areas in the country.

The first day of the Blitz (7 September 1940), Demarne recalled a "lovely sunny day. It was about 5:00 p.m. There were about 300 German aircraft. Some detached and flew along the waterfront from North Woolwich to the tidal basin, bombed the big factories along the River Thames". These included the giant Tate and Lyle factory in Silvertown. The factories had thousands of people working in them and the bombing caused "horrendous casualties". Buildings were ablaze for three miles along the River Thames. Demarne ordered 500 pumps to the scene. His commander thought was this a bit excessive and sent someone to check: he reported that 1,000 engines were needed. Remembering those days 60 years later, Demarne recalled "In the first week of the Blitz I thought London wouldn't be able to stand up to it. There were huge craters and gas flames blazing high in the air and tangled telephone cables everywhere but every night the emergency services got to work and got everything up and running all over again".

The first raid was followed by 57 consecutive nights of bombing; after one night off, when the German aircraft were hampered by bad weather, the air raids resumed until 10 May 1941. The night of 29/30 December 1940 was one of the most destructive air raids of the London Blitz and was quickly dubbed The Second Great Fire of London. The Auxiliary Fire Service worked almost continuously, putting out fires and rescuing the injured and recovering the dead from the ruined buildings.

Demarne was appointed Company Officer at Whitechapel in October 1941, in the new National Fire Service. He was twice promoted in 1943. In January 1944, as Divisional Officer, he was transferred back to West Ham in time for the "Baby" Blitz and flying bomb attacks.

He described how one night in Forest Gate a bus laden with people going home from work was hit. "The top of the bus was completely gone with the remains of the passengers scattered over nearby houses. The passengers on the lower deck had all been decapitated but were sitting in their seats "as if waiting to have their fares collected. It was the most horrific thing I witnessed". He was transferred again to the City and Central London in November 1944, where he was involved in three of the most deadly V-2 rocket attacks, in which more than three hundred people were killed.

== Post-war career ==
After two years service in the West End, based at Manchester Square Station, he was promoted to Chief Fire Officer West Ham. In 1952, he received the OBE.

He retired from the Fire Service in 1955 and moved to Australia, where he became Senior Instructor of the Fire Service Training School at Sydney Airport from its inception in 1956 to 1964. During this period, he travelled widely throughout Australasia and developed the aviation fire departments of Norfolk Island and Papua New Guinea. Under secondment to the International Civil Aviation Organization, he set up and ran the Civil Aviation Safety Centre at Beirut Airport until his retirement in 1967.

== In retirement ==
He published his memoirs of his wartime service in The London Blitz – A Fireman's Tale in 1980, followed by Our Girls – A Story of the Nation's Wartime Firewomen (1995). He also contributed to The Blitz Then and Now series of books, published in 1987, and The East End Then and Now (1997). He appeared in several television documentaries on the war and also in the Humphrey Jennings film Fires Were Started.

He had the idea of raising a memorial to the firefighters of the Blitz. A sculpture by John W Mills has become the National Firefighters Memorial, erected to the south of St. Paul's Cathedral in 1991, and elevated and rededicated in 2003.

Demarne was married in 1930. His wife died in 1986. He is survived by two daughters.
