= Hinxworth Place =

Medieval manor house in Hertfordshire, England

Coordinates: 52.04133°N 0.19492°W

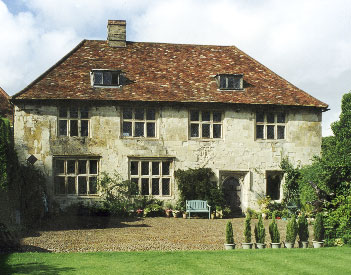
Hinxworth Place

Hinxworth Place is a medieval manor house near Hinxworth, Hertfordshire, England.

Formerly the Manor of Pulters, building was started c. 1390. The construction is of clunch with loose flint filling cavities in the lower part of the walls. There is 16th century decoration painted directly onto the stonework in one of the upper rooms.

It was once owned by John Ward, son of Richard Ward, who was Lord Mayor of London for one month in 1484. After his death it passed to John Lambard, master of the Mercers' Company and alderman of London.

The house was inhabited at one time by Cistercian monks of Pipewell Abbey in Northamptonshire.

The Drury and Andrews map of 1766 shows an L-shaped building with three separate outbuildings with indication of an avenue and other plantings.

The large spring fed pond to the south of the house is one of the sources of the river Rhee which is a major tributary of the river Cam.

In the early part of the 20th century it was owned by Walter Sale who farmed 250 acres (1.0 km^{2}) but in the 1930s was compulsorily purchased by the county council who divided the land into four smallholdings each of about 60 acres (240,000 m^{2}). The Sales remained tenants until 1949 by which time, the house having fallen into dereliction, it was sold to a banker who formed a syndicate of London professionals and artists (including the actor Peter Copley) who renovated it.

Hinxworth Place was divided and sold during the 1960s and the larger part of the property was the home and workplace of the sculptor John W Mills, a number of his works are displayed in the garden. The Wood Family currently owns the property and deeds.

== Haunting of Hinxworth Place ==
Hinxworth Place has long been reputedly haunted. The main legend concerns the sound of thumps, screams, the sound of a baby crying, and of water coming from a pump – but this only takes place during stormy autumn evenings. The story behind the disembodied sounds is the accidental killing of a young boy by his nursemaid. Having dressed himself in a white sheet as a "ghost" for a joke, the child's terrified nurse screamed and struck at him with a poker, and he fell down a flight of stairs, the commotion awakening the family's baby. Servants attempted in vain to revive the boy by putting his head under the pump.

There have also been tales of ghostly monks – sometimes a procession, sometimes alone – vanishing through a doorway long since bricked up.
