= Konrad Carl =

German trade union leader (1930–2026)

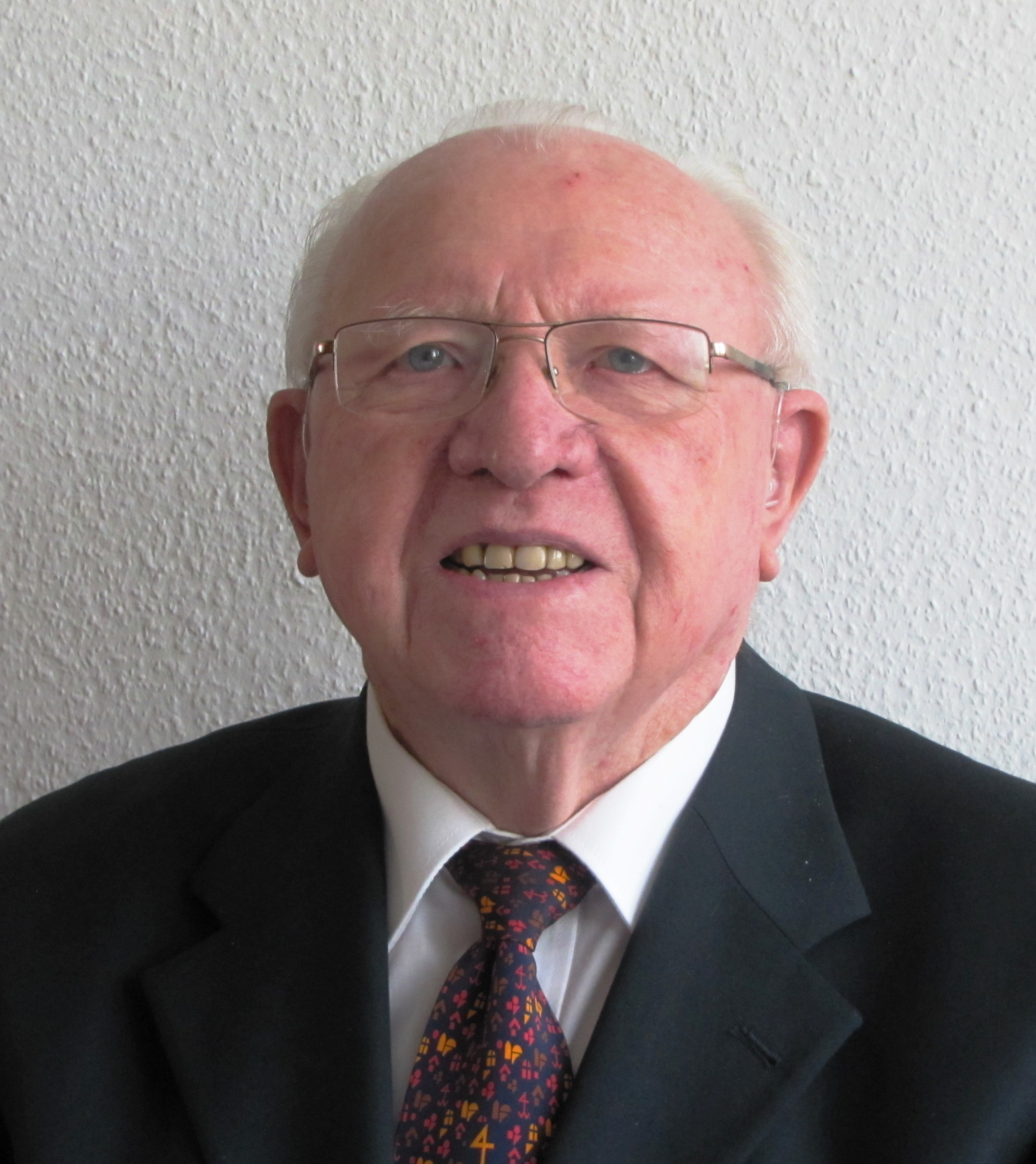
Carl in 2014

Konrad Carl (20 January 1930 – 6 April 2026) was a German trade union leader.

== Life and career ==
Born in Fürth, Carl completed an apprenticeship as a carpenter, and joined both the Social Democratic Party and the Building and Construction Union (IG BSE). With the encouragement of the union, he studied at the Dortmund Social Academy, and then became the union's full-time managing director for the Regensburg district.

In 1961, Carl was elected as chair of the union's Bavarian region, and in 1968 he was elected to the union's national executive taking the lead on human resources and legal matters. The following year, he became vice president of the union, working under Rudolf Sperner.

In 1982, Carl was elected as president of IG BSE, winning 319 out of 354 delegate votes. As leader of the union, he was regarded as a moderate figure, but a strong negotiator. Under his leadership, the union achieved a national standardisation of construction workers' wages, and the implementation of an early retirement scheme. He also introduced the first ecological initiatives, and oversaw the integration of the East German Building, Construction and Wood Union into IG BSE.

Carl was involved in founding the European Federation of Building and Woodworkers in 1974. In 1985, he was elected as president of the International Federation of Building and Wood Workers, the first German to hold the role. He retired from his domestic union posts in 1991, and as international president in 1993.

Carl died in Munich on 6 April 2026, at the age of 96.

Trade union offices
| Preceded by Rudolf Sperner | President of the Building and Construction Union; 1982–1991 | Succeeded by Bruno Köbele |
| Preceded by Bram Buijs | President of the International Federation of Building and Wood Workers; 1985–1993 | Succeeded by Bruno Köbele |
