= Jan Cremers =

Dutch politician

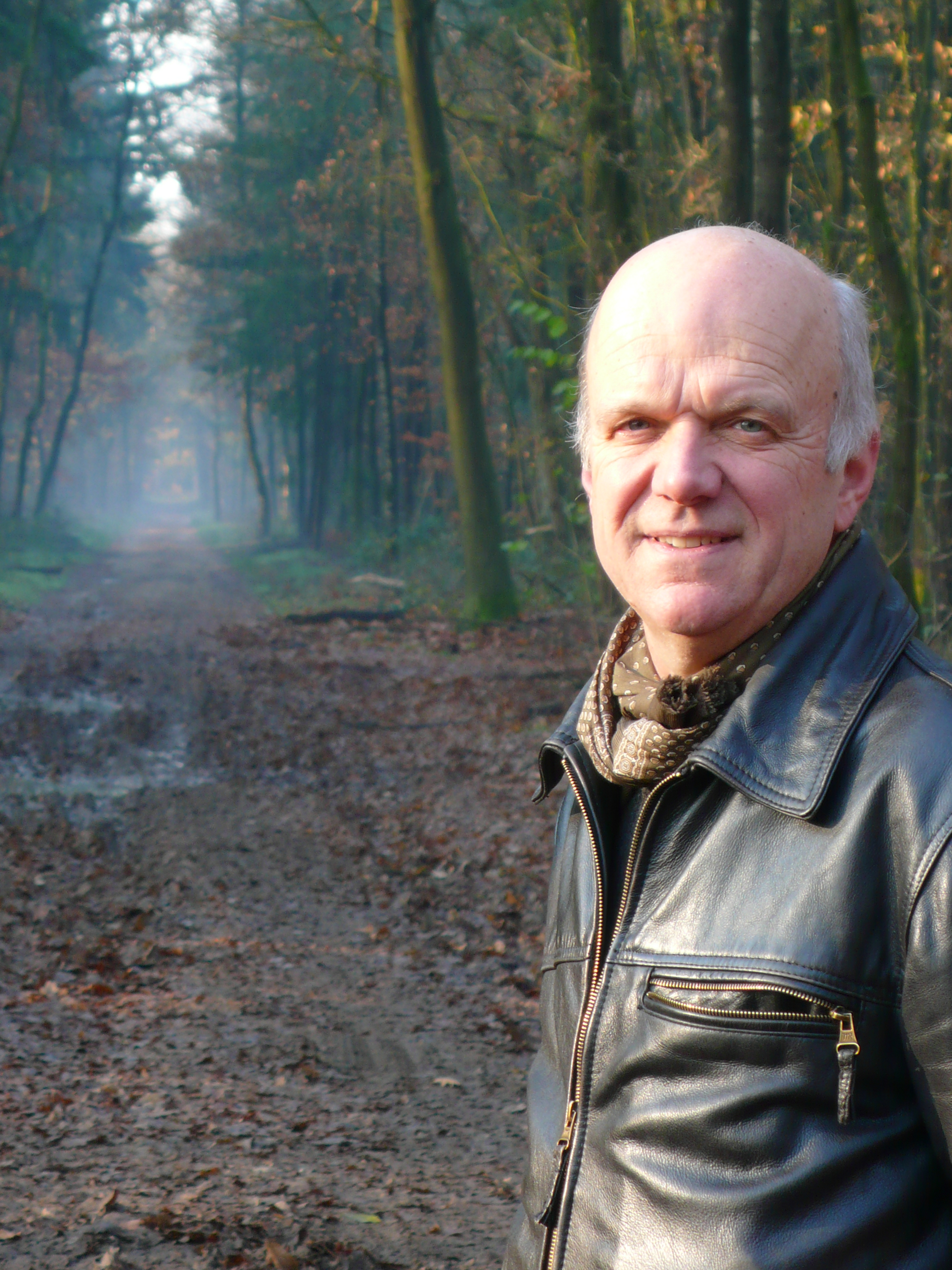
Jan Cremers (2007)

Jan M.B. Cremers (May 3, 1952 Limbricht) is a Dutch sociologist and former politician of the Labour Party (PvdA) who served as a Member of the European Parliament from 2008 until 2009.

== Political and academic career ==
He studied organisational and development sociology at the University of Tilburg, and worked as a teacher and civil servant at the Ministry of Social Affairs and Employment. He was also a member of the board of the European Trade Union Confederation and director of the National Training Fund for Works Councils (GBIO). From spring 2007 until the end of 2018, he worked as a senior researcher at the Amsterdam Institute for Labour Studies at the University of Amsterdam. In parliament, Cremers served on the Committee on Employment and Social Affairs. Currently, he is associated to the Tilburg Law School of Tilburg University (since May 2015), where he established a database on labour migration, among other things. He conducts research in the field of free movement of workers, mobility in the European labour market and the freedom to provide services and publishes regularly on European social policy, labour migration and labour standards.

== Other activities ==
Since 2009, he has been a member of the Bundeskuratorium (Der Internationale Bund - IB). In November 2013, he received an honorary doctorate from the University of Westminster for his publications on European social policy. He was involved in the creation of the European Labour Authority and he is now a member of the management board of this institution (for the term of office 2019–2023). He is also a board member at the Dutch Expertise Centre for Labour Migrants (established in October 2020).

- European Labour Authority (ELA), Member of the Management Board

Trade union offices
Preceded by Enrico Kirschen	General Secretary of the European Federation of Building and Woodworkers; 1989–2000	Succeeded by Harrie Bijen
