= Bruno Köbele =

German trade unionist

Bruno Köbele (born 10 August 1934) is a former German trade unionist.

Born in Freiburg im Breisgau, Köbele worked as a bricklayer. He joined the Building and Construction Union (IG BSE) in 1950, and joined the Social Democratic Party of Germany in 1957. He was elected to the executive committee of IG BSE in 1969, in which role he became known for his focus on improving vocational training.

In 1982, Köbele was elected as vice president of the union, and he also became involved in international trade unionism. In 1985, he was elected as president of the European Federation of Woodworkers. He was elected as president of IG BSE in 1991, and as president of the International Federation of Building and Wood Workers (IFBWW) in 1993.

Köbele retired from the IG BSE in 1995, and from the IFBWW in 1997. He became active in the Internationaler Bund, and served as its president from 2003 until 2013. He holds the First Class Federal Cross of Merit.

Trade union offices
Preceded by Konrad Carl	President of the Building and Construction Union; 1991–1995	Succeeded by Klaus Wiesehügel
Preceded by Albert Williams	President of the European Federation of Building and Woodworkers; 1991–1995	Succeeded by Ove Bengtsberg
Preceded by Konrad Carl	President of the International Federation of Building and Wood Workers; 1993–1997	Succeeded by Roel de Vries
