= Les Wood (trade unionist) =

British trade unionist

Leslie Walter Wood (27 November 1920 – 11 October 2010) was a British trade unionist.

Wood was educated at Birmingham Central Technical College before becoming an apprentice carpenter in 1935. He served in the Royal Air Force during World War II. After the war, he returned to carpentry, working for Cadbury's in Bournville. He became active in the Amalgamated Society of Woodworkers (ASW), who sponsored his study at Ruskin College and, from 1953, he worked full-time for the union.

In 1962, Wood was elected as assistant general secretary of the ASW, and he remained in post as it underwent successive mergers to become the Union of Construction, Allied Trades and Technicians (UCATT). In 1978, he was elected as general secretary of UCATT, serving until his retirement in 1985. He joined the General Council of the Trades Union Congress in 1979, and Acas in 1980. He wrote a history of trade unionism in the building trades, A Union to Build, which was published in 1979.

Trade union offices
Preceded by W. J. Martin	Assistant General Secretary of the Amalgamated Society of Woodworkers; 1962–1970	Succeeded by Position abolished
Preceded by New position	Assistant General Secretary of the Union of Construction, Allied Trades and Technicians; 1971–1978	Succeeded by Jimmy Hardman
Preceded by George Smith	General Secretary of the Union of Construction, Allied Trades and Technicians; 1978–1985	Succeeded by Albert Williams
