= Nice Guy Eddie (TV series) =

- Genre: Detective
- Created by: Johanne McAndrew; Elliot Hope
- Directed by: Alan Macmillan; Douglas Mackinnon; Morag McKinnon
- Starring: Ricky Tomlinson; Tom Ellis; Rachel Davies; Elizabeth Spriggs; John Henshaw; Christine Tremarco; Stephanie Waring
- Composer: Martin Phipps
- Country of origin: United Kingdom
- Original language: English
- No. of series: 1
- No. of episodes: 7

Production
- Executive producers: Robert Cooper; Carol Ann Docherty
- Producers: Colin McKeown; Paddy Higson
- Cinematography: Peter Fearon
- Editors: David Spiers; Andrew McClelland; Stephen Singleton
- Running time: 60—90 minutes
- Production company: BBC Northern Ireland

Original release
- Network: BBC1
- Release: 14 June 2001 – 21 July 2002

Nice Guy Eddie is a British television detective drama series, created by Elliot Hope and Johanne McAndrew, and principally written by the latter, which was first broadcast on BBC1 on 14 June 2001.

Later commissioned into a six-part series between 16 June and 21 July 2002, Nice Guy Eddie follows the exploit of a Liverpool-based bumbling private detective, Eddie McMullen, played by Ricky Tomlinson, whose life is turned upside down by the arrival of Frank Bennett (Tom Ellis), who turns up on his doorstep claiming to be his son. McMullen unwittingly takes the boy under his wing as a sidekick-cum-stooge, as the story of his true parentage plays out across the series.

Notably, the role of McMullen was written specifically for Tomlinson. For the series, a real life private investigator based in Liverpool, Tony Smith, acted as a script consultant, to ensure the stories were as true to life as possible.

Despite attracting moderate ratings, only seven episodes (including the pilot) were produced; subsequently, the BBC decided against recommissioning the show for a second series. Since initial broadcast, the series has not been repeated or released on any form of home media.

== Production ==
The series was shot on location in Liverpool in the autumn of 2001. Tomlinson said of the role; "Eddie's got a big heart, and although as a private detective he's not involved in the glamorous side of the business, he treats every case with respect. He's always getting personally involved in his cases and just wants everyone to be happy. But for all his niceness, he's not against bending the rules if it brings about the right conclusion. There is certainly a mischievous side to him, and he'll bluff his way out of a tight spot."

== Cast ==
- Ricky Tomlinson as Eddie McMullen
- Tom Ellis as Frank Bennett
- Rachel Davies as Veronica "Ronnie" McMullen
- Elizabeth Spriggs as Vera McMullen
- John Henshaw as Lawrence "Lol" O'Toole
- Christine Tremarco as Ange McMullen
- Emma Lucy Vaudrey as Becca McMullen
- Stephanie Waring as Laura McMullen
- Joanne Sherryden as Sharon McLean
- Scot Williams as Neil Jones
- Tony Maudsley as Bernard O'Malley

=== Series overview ===
Series	Episodes	Originally released	
Series	Episodes	First released	Last released
Pilot	1	14 June 2001	
1	6	16 June 2002	21 July 2002

== Episodes ==
=== Pilot (2001) ===
No.	Title	Directed by	Written by	Original release date	UK viewers (millions)
1	"Pilot"	Douglas Mackinnon	Johanne McAndrew & Elliot Hope	14 June 2001	TBA
Eddie McMullen, a Liverpudlian private eye, is shocked when a stranger turns up on his doorstep claiming to be his son. The man, Frank Bennett, claims to be the child of Barbara Hart, a former model, and best friend of Eddie's wife, Veronica. Whilst having to deal with the revelation, Eddie is hired by a local man to discover if former schoolteacher Mike Lacey (Andrew Lancel), who is now shacked up with the man's wife and two children, was responsible for a sexual assault on a schoolgirl some years previously.

=== Series 1 (2002) ===
No.	Title	Directed by	Written by	Original release date	UK viewers (millions)
1	"Sleeping with the Enemy"	Douglas Mackinnon	Johanne McAndrew	16 June 2002	5.05
Tony Mallen (Mark Benton), a less than average factory labourer, hires Eddie to find out if his girlfriend, who appears to be way out of his league, is having an affair. Eddie uses Frank as a decoy to chat the woman up, but all Tony's suspicions appear to be unsubstantiated, until it transpires that he has recently won £12.5 million on the lottery. Eddie tries to appease Ronnie by confirming he will take a DNA test to discover if he really is Frank's father or not.
2	"Dial-A-Date"	Douglas Mackinnon	Johanne McAndrew	23 June 2002	4.80
Eddie is hired by a major phone provider to look into a scam involving a sex chat hotline. It appears multiple mobile phones are being used to repeatedly call the line, netting the owner, Carl Lawson, a significant amount of money. While Eddie's task is to uncover the whereabouts of the phones, he takes pity on of Laura's schoolfriends, Mandy Shaw (Joanne Froggatt), who has left school to work for Lawson. Meanwhile, Eddie calls upon some old friends to try and find out what truly happened on the night of the party.
3	"Double Down"	Alan Macmillan	Johanne McAndrew	30 June 2002	4.78
Lol hires Eddie to look for the missing father of one of his clients, Suzanne (Eva Pope), who has been left with completing her mother's dying wishes - to find her long-lost husband. Eddie and Frank believe they have found their man through a source at the social security office, but the mystery deepens when he turns out to be an imposter. Eddie tries to convince both the imposter and Lol to take the DNA test on his behalf, while Frank temporarily moves in with Eddie's mum.
4	"Collateral Damage"	Alan Macmillan	Steve Lawson	7 July 2002	TBA
Eddie is hired by the boss of a local haulage company to find out who has been robbing him, but when he brings Laura on a routine surveillance job, the pair end up catching the robbers red handed, only to be overpowered and locked in the back of a storage container bound for South Africa with security guard Vinnie (Mark Womack). Having suspected Eddie's disappearing act to be his latest attempt to distract her from the impending DNA results, a drunken Ronnie finds herself in the arms of Lol.
5	"Stiff Competition"	Morag Mackinnon	Johanne McAndrew	14 July 2002	TBA
Eddie and Frank find themselves becoming over involved in a client's personal life, whilst trying to keep the competition, in the form of rival investigator Bernard O'Malley (Tony Maudsley), at bay. Meanwhile, Frank is mortified to discover that Eddie failed to take the first DNA test, Ronnie tries to play down her drunken kiss with Lol, and Ange is mortified when she spots Neil dancing with another woman on a girls night out.
6	"Two Men and Four High Heels"	Alan Macmillan	Johanne McAndrew	21 July 2002	4.43
Eddie's latest client is a desperate woman determined to find out if her husband is having an affair. Undercover surveillance suggests he is - but with another man, rather than a woman. Trailing the cheat to a local drag club, Eddie and Frank go undercover as drag queens, only to end up in a brawl with a group of thugs. Lol tries his hand at internet dating, and thinks he has found the woman of his dreams. The DNA results arrive, leaving Eddie with a moral dilemma.
