= George Brumwell =

British trade unionist (1939–2005)

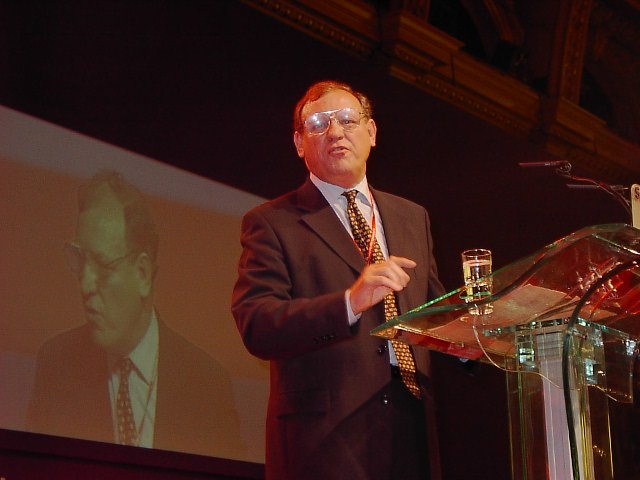
George Brumwell

George Brent Brumwell CBE (22 October 1939 – 8 November 2005) was a British trade unionist. He was General Secretary of the Union of Construction, Allied Trades and Technicians (UCATT) from 1991 to 2004.

Brumwell was born in Hartlepool, and was apprenticed as a joiner to the local shipbuilding firm of William Gray before moving into the construction industry. He joined the Amalgamated Society of Woodworkers, and became a full-time district official in Sheffield in 1971, the year that it joined the amalgamated organisation of UCATT. In 1974 he became the regional secretary in Leeds, and from 1984 represented the Midlands and Yorkshire on the union's executive council. His term as General Secretary was noted for increasing the membership and saving the union from division and financial chaos. He served on a number of construction industry bodies and on the Health and Safety Commission. He initiated and chaired the Construction Skills Certification Scheme and helped to negotiate the industry's first contributory pension scheme.

He was at the same time a Labour councillor and was leader of the council in Doncaster from 1980 to 1982.

He left a son and four daughters.

Trade union offices
Preceded by Albert Williams	General Secretary of UCATT; 1992–2004	Succeeded by Alan Ritchie
