= Building and Construction Union =

The Building and Construction Union (German: IG Bau-Steine-Erden, IG BSE) was a trade union representing building workers in West Germany.

Construction workers in Germany were organised in the German Union of Building Trades until 1933, when it was banned by the Nazis. A new union was founded in October 1949, at a conference in Karlsruhe. It was the last of the sixteen affiliates of the German Trade Union Confederation (DGB) to be established, because of difference of opinion between the communist-influenced construction union in the British occupation zone, members of the South Baden and Bavarian union who would have preferred to remain independent, and restrictions on unions in the French occupation zone.

All the initial executive members of the union had been prominent trade unionists in Weimar Germany, and as a result they had the highest average age of executive members of any DGB affiliate.

The union established the Beneficial Vacation Fund for the Construction Sector, and membership grew through the post-war need for reconstruction, although there were some downward pressures on wages from exiles from East Germany moving to the West. The union became more active under Georg Leber's leadership, from 1957, although he controversially argued that wage increases should be linked to productivity growth. However, he did negotiate additional increases for the lowest-paid workers. He also argued for an Advantage Equalisation Fund, whereby non-unionised construction workers would pay for training, scholarships and rest facilities, to benefit everyone in the industry. This was widely opposed and the policy was soon abandoned.

Under the leadership of Rudolf Sperner, from 1966, the union was less prominent, but despite several recessions, it increased its membership to a record peak in 1981. It absorbed the East German Building, Construction and Wood Union in 1990, and by 1995, it had 639,851 members. At the start of 1996, it merged with the Horticulture, Agriculture and Forestry Union, to form IG Bauen-Agrar-Umwelt.

== Presidents ==
1949: Jakob Knöss
1957: Georg Leber
1966: Rudolf Sperner
1982: Konrad Carl
1991: Bruno Köbele
1995: Klaus Wiesehügel
