= Disappearing Britain =

British television miniseries

Disappearing Britain was a three-part TV mini-series broadcast in 2006 on the Channel 5 in Britain. The series contained rare archive film of Thatcher-era Britain, with a retrospective commentary, and interviews with the general public.

Three shows were broadcast:

"Tea"
Wendy Craig explored the changing British relationship with tea

"When Coal Was King"
Ricky Tomlinson reported on the decline of British coal mining

"Beside the Seaside"
Sarah Lancashire investigated the changing nature of summer holidays

== Controversy ==
Disappearing Britain caused controversy in the second episode when the narrator, Ricky Tomlinson, made comments about Margaret Thatcher going to hell and how he would celebrate her death with coal miners: "When Thatcher dies she won't need coal, because where she's going she'll be bloody roasting! The Miners with all have a celebration, and I'll be having a pint with them when it happens!"
