= Steve Murphy (trade unionist) =

British trade unionist

Stephen David Murphy (born 8 April 1961) is a former British trade unionist.

Murphy was educated at Newbold Green School in Chesterfield before completing a City and Guilds qualification in bricklaying. He worked as a bricklayer from 1978, and became active in the Union of Construction, Allied Trades and Technicians (UCATT), serving as a shop steward from 1989.

In 1997, Murphy became UCATT's full-time Development Officer, then worked as a regional organiser from 2001, initially in the Midlands, then later in Yorkshire. In 2012, he was elected as General Secretary of UCATT. However, UCATT was suffering from serious financial problems, which led Murphy to offer his resignation to the union's executive early in 2015. This was rejected, and Murphy took time out on sick leave. However, he resigned formally in September.

Trade union offices
Preceded by Alan Ritchie	General Secretary of UCATT; 2012 – 2015	Succeeded by Post vacant Brian Rye as Acting Gen. Sec.
