= Albert Williams (trade unionist) =

British trade unionist

Albert Williams (12 February 1927 – 28 November 2007) was a British trade unionist.

Born in Stockport, Williams left school at the age of fourteen and completed an apprenticeship as a bricklayer with the Manchester Corporation. During World War II, he served in India and South East Asia, remaining in the forces until 1948. He then returned to Manchester, finding work as a bricklayer, and joined both the Amalgamated Union of Building Trade Workers (AUBTW) and the Communist Party of Great Britain (CPGB).

Williams became known as a militant trade union activist, becoming a branch secretary and a regional delegate in quick succession, and was elected to the AUBTW's executive council in 1958. He was the union's youngest ever executive council member, and this despite the union's right-wing leadership.

In 1959, Williams was elected to the national executive of the CPGB, serving on it for three years before standing down. This was perhaps in order to distance himself from allegations that CPGB members in the Electrical Trades Union had engaged in ballot rigging. He remained on the executive of the AUBTW and its successors, through a series of mergers which formed the Union of Construction, Allied Trades and Technicians (UCATT), and was prominent in the national strike of 1972 which led to the jailing of the Shrewsbury Two. With the union's leadership keen to distance themselves from the case, Williams was permitted to lead the union's fundraising efforts for the two.

By the late 1970s, Williams was the National President of UCATT. In 1977, he resigned from the CPGB, joining the Labour Party, in which he immediately became known as a member of the right-wing.

In 1984, Williams was elected as the General Secretary of UCATT. While he had always opposed the unionisation of the "lump" - self-employed labourers - he changed his mind, and narrowly persuade the union to adopt this policy in 1990. His next campaign was to arrange a merger of the union into the Electrical, Electronic, Telecommunications and Plumbing Union (EETPU). However, the EETPU had been expelled from the Trades Union Congress (TUC) for poaching members of other unions, and the majority of UCATT's own executive opposed the merger. In 1991, the union suspended Williams on full pay; three organisers left in protest to join the EETPU, but fourteen said that they would join the TUC-affiliated GMB Union and seek to persuade a majority of members to follow them. The TUC undertook mediation, which resulted in the GMB withdrawing from efforts to split the union, and Williams' suspension being lifted. However, the merger with the EETPU was also abandoned, and Williams' position in the union greatly weakened. He retired the following year.

Trade union offices
Preceded by Les Wood	General Secretary of UCATT; 1985–1992	Succeeded by George Brumwell
Preceded by Juan Fernandez	President of the European Federation of Building and Woodworkers; 1987–1991	Succeeded by Bruno Köbele
