= European Federation of Building and Woodworkers =

European trade union federation

The European Federation of Building and Woodworkers (EFBWW) is a European trade union federation.

In 1958, several European unions founded an informal group, the Joint European Committee for the Building and Woodworking Sector. In 1974, this was refounded on a formal basis, as the European Federation of Building and Woodworkers in the European Economic Community. It was renamed as the EFBWW in 1983, and the following year, it was recognised by the European Trade Union Confederation. By 1999, it had 51 affiliates, with a total of 3.1 million members.

The federation works closely with the Nordic Federation of Building and Woodworkers, which brings together unions in Northern Europe.

== Leadership ==
=== General Secretaries ===
1974: Juan Fernandez
1981: Enrico Kirschen
1989: Jan Cremers
2000: Harrie Bijen
2007: Sam Hägglund
2019: Tom Deleu

=== Presidents ===
1974: Emiel Janssens
1976: André Vanden Broucke
1983: Juan Fernandez
1987: Albert Williams
1991: Bruno Köbele
1995: Ove Bengtsberg
2002: Ernst-Ludwig Laux
2003: Arne Johansen
2007: Domenico Pesenti
2015: Dietmar Schäfers
2019: Johan Lindholm
2024: Bruno Bothua
2026: Claus von Elling
