= Shrewsbury Justice Centre =

Court building in Shrewsbury, England

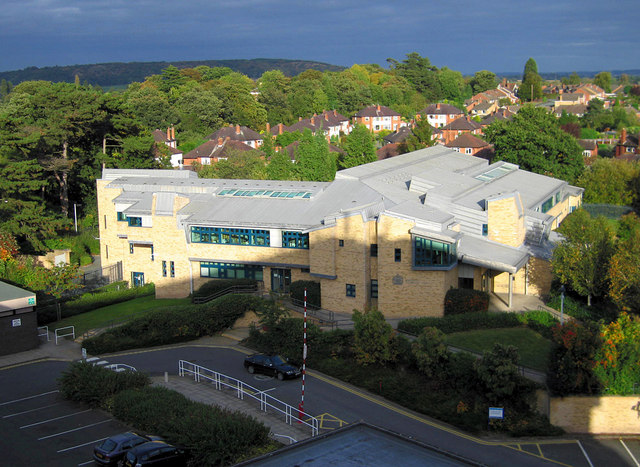
- Shrewsbury Justice Centre

- Shown in Shropshire
- 52.7050°N 2.7299°W
- Location: Preston Street, Shrewsbury

History
- Built: 1994

Site notes
- Architectural style: Modernist style

Shrewsbury Justice Centre is a Crown Court venue which deals with criminal cases, in Preston Street, Shrewsbury, England.

== History ==
For much of the 20th century, magistrates' court hearings took place in the Old Market Hall in The Square in Shrewsbury. A single storey extension, designed by the county architect, Ralph Crowe, was added to the Shirehall, to accommodate the assizes and the local quarter session hearings, in 1967. Following the implementation of the Courts Act 1971, the former assizes courthouse became the venue for hearings of the newly designated Shrewsbury Crown Court. It was in this courtroom that, in 1973, 24 building workers, including Ricky Tomlinson and Des Warren, were convicted of various offences including conspiracy to intimidate, unlawful assembly and affray as a result of their picketing activities. The Court of Appeal overturned the convictions in March 2021.

In the early 1990s, Shropshire County Council decided to erect a dedicated courthouse for magistrates' court hearings. The site selected by the county council was open land just to the east of the Shirehall. The new building was designed in the Modernist style, built by M. A. Boswell (Contractors) in buff brick at a cost of £2.6 million and was completed in 1994. The design involved an asymmetrical main frontage on two floors facing onto Preston Street. It featured a prominent oriel window at the southwest corner of the building on the first floor. There was a doorway with a canopy at ground floor level in the second bay on the left and there was a single storey lean-to structure projecting from the centre of the main frontage. The other bays were fenestrated on an irregular basis by casement windows on both floors. Internally, the building was laid out to accommodate four courtrooms.

After magistrates court hearings were transferred to Telford Magistrates Court, the building in Shrewsbury closed as a magistrates court on 31 March 2016. It was subsequently converted for use as a crown court and as a venue for social security case hearings at a cost of £5 million, and was officially re-opened by the Senior Presiding Judge for England and Wales, Dame Julia Macur, as the Shrewsbury Justice Centre on 12 April 2019.

Notable cases have included the trial and conviction of Darren Paisley and Serena Sibson-Bartram, in April 2022, for child neglect.
