= Ricky Tomlinson =

English actor (born 1939)

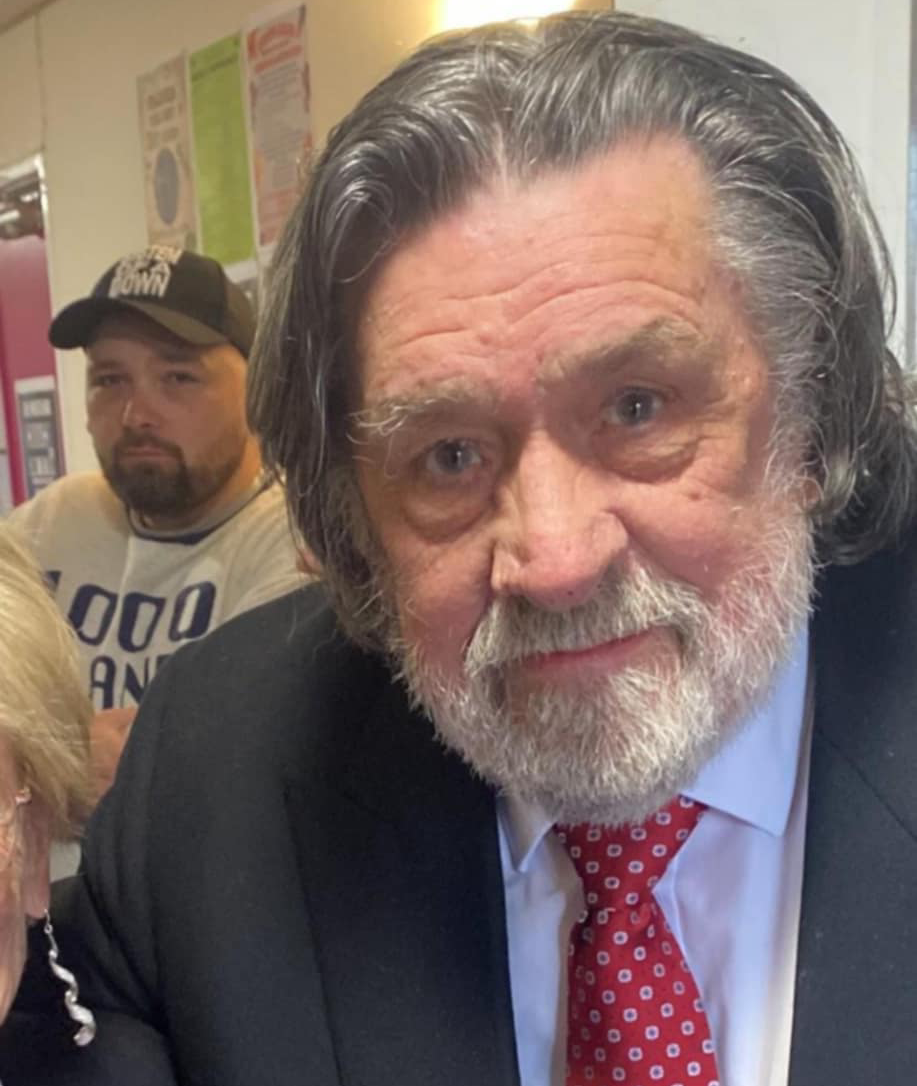
- Tomlinson in November 2025
- Born: Eric Tomlinson; 26 September 1939 (age 87); Blackpool, England
- Occupation: Actor
- Years active: 1981–present
- Spouses: Marlene Clifton (m. 1962; div. 1986) Rita Cumiskey (m. 2003)
- Children: 3

Eric Tomlinson (born 26 September 1939) is an English actor. He is best known for his television roles as Bobby Grant in the soap opera Brookside (1982–1988), DCI Charlie Wise in Cracker (1993–2006) and Jim Royle in The Royle Family (1998–2012). He also played the titular character in the football mockumentary Mike Bassett: England Manager (2001).

== Early life ==
Eric Tomlinson was born at Burleigh House in the Bispham area of Blackpool on 26 September 1939, the son of parents from Liverpool. His father was a baker. He was born in Bispham because his mother was evacuated there during World War II over concerns that Liverpool would be bombed, which it eventually was. The family settled back in Liverpool following the war, and he has lived there since. He attended Walton Technical College in the Walton area of Liverpool, after passing an exam when he was 13. His favourite subject was English literature.

In the late 1950s and early 1960s, Tomlinson played the banjo in three bands: the Guitanjos, Hobo Rick & the City Slickers, and Hobo Rick & the Hi-Free Three. The band's pianist was John Lowe, a former member of the Quarrymen, which would later become the Beatles. A plasterer by trade, Tomlinson worked on various building sites for many years.

== Career ==
=== Television ===
Tomlinson played Bobby Grant from the show's inception in 1982, starring in 193 episodes of the Channel 4 soap opera Brookside (1982–1988). He played by DCI Charlie Wise in 15 episodes of Cracker (1994-1996), He played Jim Pratt in 29 episodes of Playing the Field (1998–2002), and Jim Royle in the BBC sitcom The Royle Family (1998–2012).

In 2001, he played a Liverpool private investigator in the BBC Series Nice Guy Eddie, using down-to-earth cases—actually based upon real-life ones from Liverpool private investigator Tony Smith—the show also starred Tom Ellis and John Henshaw. He featured heavily in series two of Paul Abbott's series Clocking Off.

Tomlinson has fronted a series of television adverts for the utility company British Gas. In January 2010, he began to appear in a series of advertisements for the frozen food chain Farmfoods. In 2017, he provided a voiceover for an advert for McCain Foods.

On 19 June 2006, Tomlinson made his début as the guest celebrity in Dictionary Corner on the long-running UK Channel 4 game show Countdown. In 2006, he presented a programme in Channel Five's Disappearing Britain series entitled "When Coal Was King". In March 2007, Tomlinson presented a documentary detailing his version of the "Shrewsbury Two" case, for which he served time in prison, comparing his political activism as a trade unionist to the work of the suffragettes in BBC's One Life: Guilty My Arse,

In March 2011, Tomlinson appeared in an advertising campaign for UK retail chain The Range. The BBC broadcast a programme in its Who Do You Think You Are?, series 13 on Tomlinson's ancestors, which traced his family back through a number of carters working around Liverpool at a time when the city was a bustling port. In 2020, Tomlinson and his Royle Family co-star Ralf Little presented a travel series called Ricky & Ralf's Very Northern Road Trip for Gold.

The 2023 Eurovision Song Contest was held in Liverpool, with the UK replacing the planned host country Ukraine following the 2022 Russian invasion of Ukraine; Tomlinson appeared and recited a poem dedicated to the Beatles, then reprised his role as Brookside character Bobby Grant, who was seen putting up Ukrainian-themed bunting outside the Grant home on Brookside Close.

In September 2025, it was confirmed that Tomlinson would again reprise the role of Bobby Grant in a special crossover episode of Brookside to mark the 30th anniversary of Hollyoaks.

=== Film ===
Tomlinson starred alongside Robert Carlyle and Peter Mullan in the Ken Loach directed film Riff-Raff (1991), which won European Film Award for Best Film.

He played the main character Mike Bassett in the British satirical mockumentary comedy film Mike Bassett: England Manager (2001). Other films include Raining Stones (1993), Hillsborough (1996), and Once Upon a Time in the Midlands (2002).

In 2017, he starred in the LGBT-themed short film Tellin' Dad as the father of the main character who comes out to him. (2017)

=== Music ===
He released a CD album entitled Music My Arse in 2001. He released a single at Christmas 2006 which reached No. 25 in the UK charts entitled "Christmas My A*se".

== Personal life ==
Tomlinson was married to Marlene Clifton from 1962 until their divorce in 1986. They had three children together. He has been married to Rita Cumiskey since 2003. He has lived in Liverpool since his childhood and said in a May 2014 interview, "I will never, ever move away from Liverpool. I love it here."

In 2003, Tomlinson published his autobiography Ricky, which spent five weeks at the top of the UK best-selling new books chart. In the book, Tomlinson admitted to having extramarital affairs and graphically described his time in prison.

On 19 October 2007, Tomlinson underwent quadruple heart bypass surgery at the Liverpool Heart and Chest Hospital.

Tomlinson suffers from the rare skin condition nodular prurigo, which was the subject of an interview in the Daily Mirror in October 2013.

== Politics ==
In his late 20s, Tomlinson was attracted to right-wing politics and was a member of the National Front for a period after Enoch Powell's April 1968 "Rivers of Blood" speech. In the early 1970s, his political views shifted radically to the left; he was affected by the book The Ragged-Trousered Philanthropists, which was given to him by the governor of the prison in which he was being held at the time.

In 1972, Tomlinson joined the flying pickets in a building workers' dispute in Shrewsbury. Following allegations of violence during this protest, Tomlinson was charged with "conspiracy to intimidate" as one of the Shrewsbury Two in 1973. Despite pleading his innocence at Shrewsbury Crown Court, he was found guilty and sentenced to two years in prison, alongside fellow picket Des Warren. After his release in 1975, he disrupted the TUC conference by shouting from the wings after he had been prevented from speaking on the stage. In 2012, Tomlinson and others sought to have the convictions overturned by the Criminal Cases Review Commission (CCRC). In 2013, a paper petition was launched alongside the existing online petition for an Early Day Motion by MP John McDonnell to be brought. In July, at the Durham Miners' Gala, he again campaigned against the convictions. In May 2020, it was announced that the CCRC had referred a number of convictions relating to the Shrewsbury dispute, including Tomlinson's, to the Court of Appeal. which subsequently overturned the convictions in March 2021.

Tomlinson is a close friend of Arthur Scargill and often appears on party political broadcasts for Scargill's Socialist Labour Party, most recently for the 2009 European Parliament elections. He is a long-time member of the Socialist Labour Party and has been the party's most prominent celebrity supporter since its formation in 1996. He has also expressed support for the Campaign for a New Workers' Party. A public meeting was hosted by the CNWP in Liverpool on 12 February 2007, featuring Tomlinson alongside Tommy Sheridan and Tony Mulhearn. During the meeting, Tomlinson used the slogan "New Labour My Arse".

On 5 February 2010, Tomlinson revealed his plan to stand as the Socialist Labour Party candidate for the Liverpool Wavertree constituency at the 2010 general election in protest at the selection of Luciana Berger, a 28-year-old Londoner, as the Labour Party candidate. Kim Singleton was ultimately selected for the seat; in a statement, the SLP said that he could not contest the election due to "personal and contractual commitments". Tomlinson added, "I am disappointed not to be able to stand. But I am pleased to give the chosen candidate my wholehearted support." He also said that "people say 'you could be letting the Tories in' but there is no difference between the Conservatives and New Labour". Singleton ultimately finished sixth out of seven candidates, with Berger winning the seat.

While discussing the forthcoming Labour Party leadership election during a guest appearance on an episode of Loose Women on 17 August 2015, Tomlinson said, "I know both of [the candidates] and I know Andy quite well, and he was my choice right up until I went to listen to Jeremy Corbyn and I went to the Adelphi Hotel where there was 3,000 people there, the room holds 800 and [they] were out into the streets, they couldn't get in. And everything he said with I agreed with, you know, leave the National Health Service alone, get rid of Trident, stuff like that, so it doesn't matter to me who gets the Labour leadership, it really doesn't matter. But whatever happens both of them will be in the Shadow Cabinet."

In the 2020 Labour Party leadership election, Tomlinson endorsed Keir Starmer, having worked with Starmer during the Shrewsbury 24 justice campaign.

=== Richard Whiteley claims ===
In March 2017, Tomlinson claimed during an interview that the late television host Richard Whiteley had been an undercover agent for MI5 and had assisted them in securing his 1973 imprisonment by co-presenting a television documentary called Red Under the Bed, which was critical of his political and trade union activities and had swayed the jury. The CCRC cited the documentary and its possible influence on the jury when announcing its decision to refer the cases of Tomlinson and others to the Court of Appeal.

== Charity work ==
In 2008, Tomlinson donated £200,000 as patron of the Human Milk Bank of Cheshire and North Wales. The charity provides babies on Special Care Baby Units with milk from donor mothers, significantly improving their chances of survival and long-term development. He said: "Due to my own recent experiences with my health, I know how much hospitals and appeals appreciate help and assistance. This is such an important service which can help so many families and I'm very honoured to be the patron."

In November 2010, it was reported that Tomlinson had donated £1 million to the Alder Hey Children's Hospital in Liverpool two years previously.

== Honours ==
In October 2014, Tomlinson was awarded the Freedom of Liverpool.

== Filmography ==
=== Television ===
Year	Title	Role	Notes
1981	Play for Today	Dennis	Episode: "United Kingdom"
1982	Crown Court	Clerk of Court	3 episodes
1982	Boys from the Blackstuff	Hospital Doctor	Episode: "George's Last Ride"
1982–1988	Brookside	Bobby Grant	193 episodes
1989	Dear Sarah	Warder #1	Television film
1993	The Bill	Ray Hickey	Episode: "Home to Roost"
1994	Where the Buffalo Roam	Glyn Hunter	Television film
1995	The All New Alexei Sayle Show	Man Selling Chicken in Pub	Episode: #2.2
1994–1995	Roughnecks	Cinders	13 episodes
1994–1996	Cracker	DCI Charlie Wise	15 episodes
1996	Hillsborough	John Glover	Television film
1997	The Fix	Gordon	Television film
1997	10x10		Episode: "Johnny Watkins Walks on Water"
1998–2002	Playing the Field	Jim Pratt	29 episodes
1998–2012	The Royle Family	Jim Royle	25 episodes
1999	Dockers	Macca Macaulay	Television film
1999	Cold Feet	Cabbie	Episode: #2.5
1999	The Greatest Store in the World	Santa	Television film
1999	Hooves of Fire	Santa Claus (voice)	Television film
2000	Safe as Houses	Lawrence Davidson	Television film
2001	Clocking Off	Ronnie Anderson	4 episodes
2001	Nice Guy Eddie	Eddie McMullen	Television film
2001	My Beautiful Son	Uncle Alfred	Television film
2002	Nice Guy Eddie	Eddie McMullen	6 episodes
2004	Dalziel and Pascoe	Rowan Priestley	Episode: "The Price of Fame"
2004	Monkey Trousers	Various roles	Television film
2004–2005	Down to Earth	Tony Murphy	18 episodes
2005	Mike Bassett: Manager	Mike Bassett	6 episodes
2006	Animal Spies	Ted (voice)	Television series
2008	Stepdad	Grandad	Television film
2013	Great Night Out	Warren	6 episodes
2013	Comic Relief: Red Nose Day 2013	Jim Royle	Television film
2013–2014	In the Flesh	Ken Burton	4 episodes
2016	The Last Dragonslayer	Moobin	Television film
2019	Matopulas	Terry McGlocklin	Television film
2020	Ricky & Ralf's Very Northern Road Trip	Himself	6 episodes. With Ralf Little
2022	The Witchfinder	Crockett	Episode: #1.5
2024	Ricky, Sue and a Trip or Two	Himself	3 episodes. With Sue Johnston
2024	DNA Journey With Ancestry	Himself	1 episodes. With Sue Johnston
2025	Hollyoaks	Bobby Grant	1 episode

=== Film ===
Year	Title	Role	Notes
1987	Out of Order	Decorator	
1991	Riff-Raff	Larry	European Film Award for Best Film 1991
1993	Raining Stones	Tommy	
1995	Butterfly Kiss	Robert	
1996	Bob's Weekend	Jack	
1997	Life Is All You Get	Bruno 'Buddy' Budenski	aka Das Leben ist eine Baustelle
1997	Preaching to the Perverted	Fibbin' Gibbins	
1997	Mojo	Ezra	
1999	Nasty Neighbours	Harold Peach	
1999	The Greatest Store in the World	Santa	
2000	Lounge Act	(voice)	Short film
2001	Mike Bassett: England Manager	Mike Bassett	
2001	The 51st State	Leopold Durant	
2002	Once Upon a Time in the Midlands	Charlie	
2002	Al's Lads	Billy	
2002	Five Ways John Wayne Didn't Die	Dead Man (voice)	
2003	The Virgin of Liverpool	Frank Conlon	
2007	Learning to Walk	Granddad	Short film
2007	Plenty More Fish	Compere	Short film
2009	Nativity!	Lord Mayor	
2011	Flutter	Freddie	
2014	Psyched	Brian the Ghost Union President	Short film
2014	Northern Soul	John's Grandad	
2015	The Hound & the Rabbit	William	Short film
2015	Him Upstairs	Frank Conroy	Short film
2016	Grimsby	Paedo Pete	
2016	Mike Bassett: Interim Manager	Mike Bassett	
2017	Tellin' Dad	Dad	Short film
2017	Gloves Off	Mick	
2018	Fighter from the Docks	Grandad	
2018	The More You Ignore Me	Bert Wildgoose	
2022	Tales of the Creeping Death	Dad	
2023	Our Kid	Phil Reilly	
