= Des Warren =

British trade unionist (1937–2004)

Des Warren (10 October 1937 – 24 April 2004) was a British construction worker, trade union activist and – with Ricky Tomlinson – one of the Shrewsbury Two, convicted at Shrewsbury Crown Court for "conspiracy to intimidate" whilst picketing in Shropshire in 1972, and imprisoned for three years. His autobiography, The Key To My Cell, put forward his version of events, and what he considered "the real conspiracy" — that the arrests were part of a plan to intimidate the trade union movement.

Warren was regarded as an energetic strike leader. As well as his work setting up pickets and speaking at union rallies and conferences, he demanded a minimum wage (of £1 an hour) and campaigned to put an end to "the lump" — a practice prevalent on non-unionised building sites, whereby the employee surrendered their employment rights in return for a cash lump sum with no tax or insurance deducted.

His death in 2004 from Parkinson's Disease has been linked with the long-term effects of the treatment he received during his incarceration, in particular the "liquid cosh" – a cocktail of tranquillisers administered to inmates.

On 4 July 2009, a march was organised in Shrewsbury, by the local trades council and the Justice for Pickets campaign, starting from the Abbey, and finishing at the Lord Hill's Column, where the demonstrators were addressed by several speakers.

As of 2013, Ricky Tomlinson continues to campaign for Warren's name to be posthumously cleared, along with his own. He campaigned against the convictions at the Durham Miners' Gala in July 2013.

The convictions were put aside by the Court of Appeal on Tuesday 23 March 2021 following new evidence unearthed at the National Archives that showed that Police officers had destroyed witness statements in support of the convicted Trade Unionists that would have exonerated them.
