= Alan Ritchie =

Scottish trade unionist (born 1951)

Alan Ritchie (born 1951) is a Scottish trade unionist, currently an organiser at GMB Scotland.

Ritchie left school at the age of fifteen, and became a joiner in a shipyard in Glasgow. He joined the Amalgamated Society of Woodworkers, which subsequently became part of the Union of Construction, Allied Trades and Technicians (UCATT). In 1971, he was prominent in the Upper Clyde Shipbuilders work-in, which attempted to save the shipyards.

Ritchie became active in the Scottish Trades Union Congress, chairing its Youth Advisory Committee, and took a number of full-time positions in UCATT, becoming its Scottish regional secretary in 1991. In 2004, he was elected as the union's general secretary, easily beating Michael Dooley.

As general secretary, Ritchie led the group of trade unionists working on the 2012 Olympic Games construction project, and campaigned against nominal self-employment of building workers and for improved safety on construction sites. He was re-elected in 2009, again beating Dooley, but it later emerged that almost half the union's members were never sent ballot papers, and the result was declared void. Ritchie declared his intention to stand in the re-run election, but before it took place, he was suspended over unconnected allegations of expenses fraud. The following year, he resigned from the union.

Trade union offices
Preceded by George Brumwell	General Secretary of UCATT; 2004 – 2012	Succeeded by Steve Murphy
