= National Firefighters Memorial =

Memorial sculpture in London, England

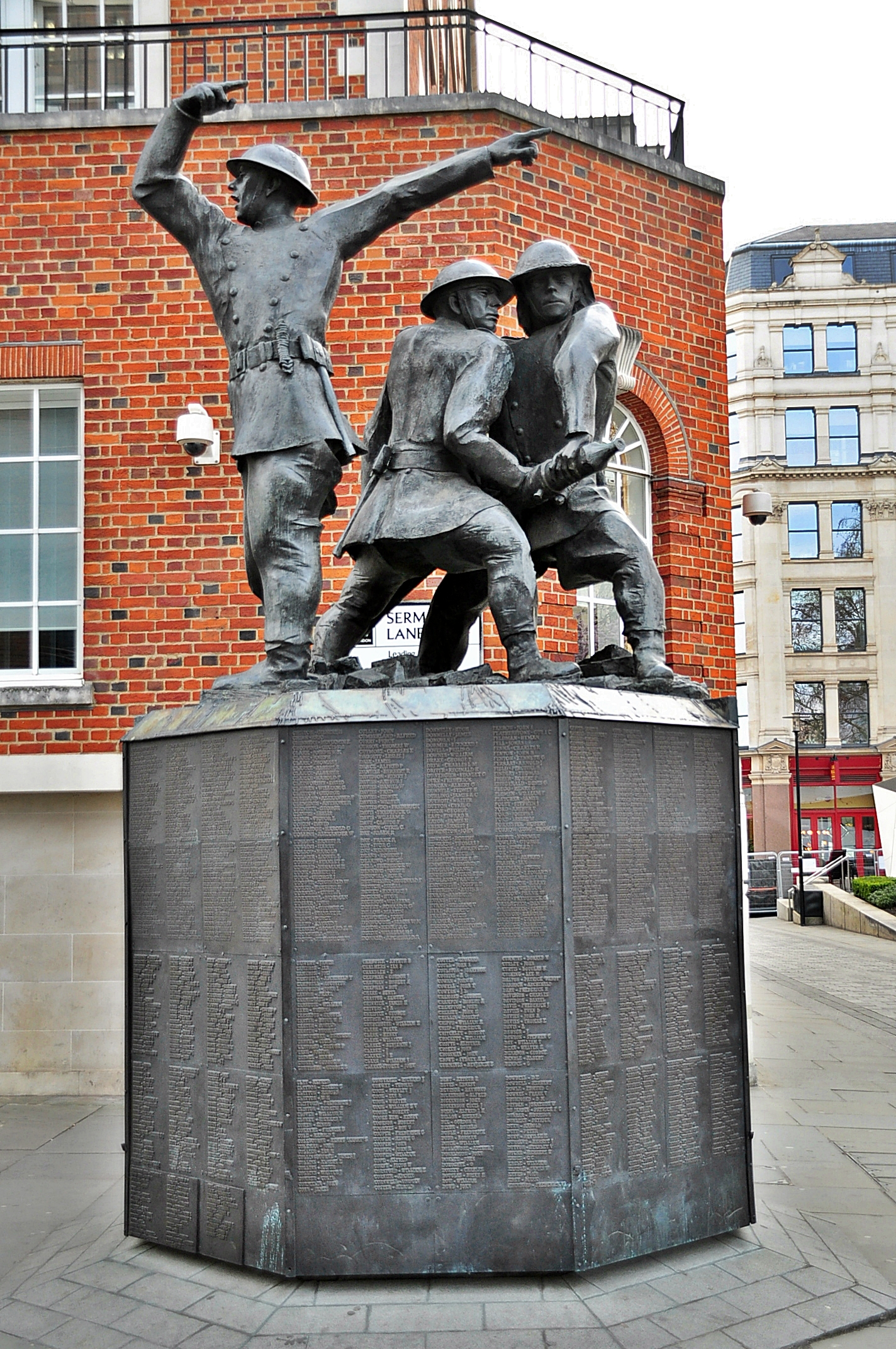
- The National Firefighters Memorial
- Interactive map of National Firefighters Memorial
- Location: City of London
- Coordinates: 51.51290°N 0.09845°W
- Designer: John W. Mills
- Type: Memorial
- Material: Bronze
- Opening date: 4 May 1991

The National Firefighters Memorial is a memorial composed of three bronze statues depicting firefighters in action at the height of the Blitz. It is located on the Jubilee Walkway to the south of St Paul's Cathedral in the City of London, and it is approachable from the south bank of the River Thames via the Millennium Footbridge.

The monument, originally the concept of Cyril Demarne, was commissioned by the Firefighters Memorial Charitable Trust set up in 1990. It was sculpted by John W. Mills. Initially, the structure was intended as a tribute to those men and women who fought so gallantly against fire on the streets of London during the Blitz of World War II, when the city was struck by bombs on 57 consecutive nights in a sustained campaign of bombing. It also served as a monument to commemorate the service of firefighters throughout the war. Queen Elizabeth The Queen Mother unveiled the memorial on 4 May 1991.

It was decided in 1998 to make the memorial a national monument that would commemorate not just the firefighters who died in World War II, but the lives of all firefighters throughout the United Kingdom who were killed in the line of duty. The National Firefighters Memorial was moved from its original site in Old Change Court, the plinth was elevated by a little over one meter, and the names of all those killed in peacetime were added.

The Princess Royal, patron of the Firefighters' Memorial Charitable Trust, attended a service and ceremony of re-dedication on 16 September 2003. A total of 1,192 names were inscribed in bronze onto the memorial.

A service of remembrance is held at the memorial annually on the Sunday closest to 7 September, the anniversary of the start of the Blitz.

== See also ==
- List of firefighting monuments and memorials
- List of public art in the City of London
