= John Mills (sculptor) =

English sculptor (1933–2023)

John W. Mills
- Born: John William Mills; 4 March 1933; Balham, London, England
- Died: 24 October 2023 (aged 90)
- Occupations: Sculptor, author
- Spouse: Josephine Mills
- Children: 2

John William Mills PPRBS ARCA FRSA (4 March 1933 – 24 October 2023) was an English sculptor.

He studied at Hammersmith School of Art, 1947–54, and at the Royal College of Art, 1956–60. He was a resident at Digswell House 1962–66, before living at Hinxworth Place in Hertfordshire. Mills died on 24 October 2023, at the age of 90.

== Teaching ==
Various part-time teaching posts in UK from 1958 to 1962:

- Full-time at St. Albans School of Art and Hertfordshire College of Art and Design, 1962–77
- Visiting Associate Professor in Printmaking and Sculpture, Eastern Michigan University, 1970–71
- Visiting lecturer Detroit School of Creative Arts, 1970–71
- Visiting Professor and Artist in Residence University of Michigan, 1980.

== Awards ==
- Fellow of the Royal British Society of Sculptors, 1982
- Otto Beit medal, Royal British Society of Sculptors, 1983 (for the sculpture 'Curved Neck Grace')
- President of the Society, 1986, and again in 1997
- Fellow of the Royal Society of Arts, 1993
- Honorary Master of Arts, University College Northampton, 2000

== Work in public places ==
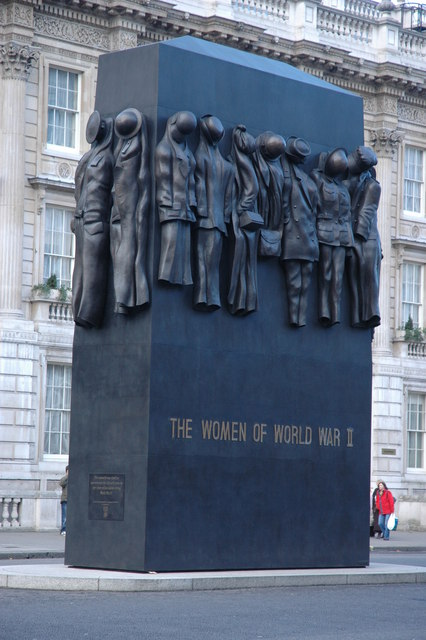
Monument to the Women of World War II Whitehall London.

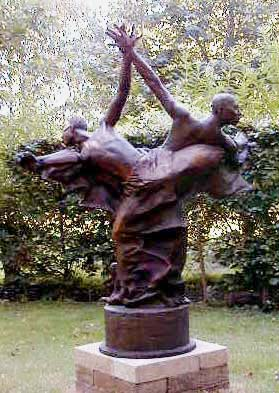
Three Kings. Hinxworth Place.

- William Blake Memorial (Blake House, London)
- Blitz the National Firefighters Memorial (South side of St. Paul's Cathedral, London)
- London River Man (Isle of Dogs, London)
- John Jorrocks (Croydon, London)
- Family Outing (Thames Centre, Newton Aycliffe, County Durham, England)
- Brothers (University Hospital, Ann Arbor, Michigan USA)
- Swimmers (Cambridge swimming pool, Cambridge, England)
- Diver (Eastern Michigan University, USA)
- St George (Windsor Court Hotel, New Orleans, USA)
- Degas Dancing (La Cabaña Restaurant, Buenos Aires, Argentina)
- Thoughtful Girl (Clark University, Worcester, Massachusetts, USA)
- The Thrower (Ernest Bevin School, Tooting, London)
- Boy With Cat (Highfields, Hemel Hempstead, England)
- Lion (Ward Freeman School, Buntingford, Hertfordshire, England)
- The Unicorn and Wellcome (Wellcome Foundation, Beckenham, Kent, England)
- Road Research (Road Research Laboratories, Crowthorne, England)
- The Risen Christ, St Mary's Church, Ashwell, Hertfordshire, England)
- Sir Thomas Sopwith (Brooklands Museum, Brooklands, England)
- Sir Lawrence Bragg, (The Royal Institution, London)
- Jackie Milburn Memorial (Ashington, Northumberland, England)
- The Meeting, Harpur Square, Bedford, Bedfordshire, England
- Chinese Reference, Harlow, Essex, England (Tesco Site)
- Quadriga, fountain Charleston Place Hotel, Charleston, South Carolina, USA
- Time, Cavendish Hotel (Chatsworth House Estate) Derbyshire, England
- The Risen Christ, Church of Great St Mary, Sawbridgeworth, Essex, England
- Campus Thoughts, University College Northampton, England
- Memorial to Alan Turing, University of Surrey, Guildford, England
- Lion and the Unicorn and Digitalis, William Harvey Centre, Charterhouse Square, London
- Monument to the Women of World War II Whitehall, London

== Competitions ==
- Winner of the design competition for 'The Topham Trophy' 1961 and 1962.
- Winner of the RBS silver medal in 1991 for 'Blitz'.
- Winner of the Royal Mint design competition for the 'D-Day fifty pence coin 1993'.
- Winner of the Royal Mint design competition for the 'VE Day two pound coin 1994'.
- Winner of the Royal Mint design competition for the Euro Cup two pound coin 1995.
- Winner of the Coin of the Year award (Krause Publications) for the D-Day fifty pence 1994.
- Winner of the Royal Mint design competition for the Euro Cent, British entry for the European Competition 1996.
- Winner of the Royal Mint design competition for the 25th anniversary of the our entry into the Common Market fifty pence coin 1997.
- Winner of the Royal Mint design competition for the 50th anniversary of DNA Double helix two pound coin.

== Published works ==
- Sculpture in Ciment Fondu, 1958 (Contractors Record, London).
- The Technique of Sculpture 1962 (B.T.Batsford, London).
- Sculpture in Concrete, 1966 (McClaren, London ).
- The Technique of Casting for Sculpture 1968 (B.T.Batsford, London).
- Studio Bronze Casting 1969 (McClaren, London), this book was written in collaboration with Michael Gillespie ARBS.
- Modelling the Figure and Head 1978 (B.T.Batsford, London).
- Encyclopaedia of Sculpture Techniques 1989 (B.T.Batsford, London).
- Catalogue contribution for Chelsea Harbour 93 (RBS) 1993.
- Sculpture 108, Contributed article 'What I didn't learn at Art School' Spring issue 1997
- Sculpting the Human Figure 2006 (Crowood Press)

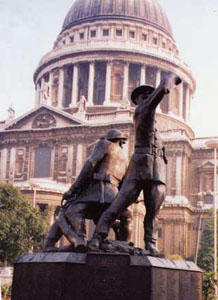
National Firefighters Memorial, St Paul's Cathedral London.

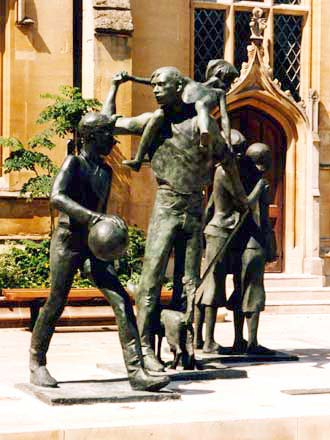
The Meeting. Harpur Square, Bedford.

Quadrega Fountain. Charleston Place Hotel, Charleston, South Carolina.
